= DeKalb County Courthouse =

DeKalb County Courthouse may refer to:

- Old DeKalb County Courthouse (Georgia), Decatur, Georgia, one of the National Register of Historic Places listings in DeKalb County, Georgia
- DeKalb County Courthouse (Illinois), Sycamore, Illinois
- DeKalb County Courthouse (Missouri), Maysville, Missouri
