= Missouri Library Association =

Professional association for librarians in Missouri

- Formation: December 18, 1900; 125 years ago
- Founded at: Columbia, Missouri
- Tax ID no.: 44-0658268
- Headquarters: Ballwin, Missouri
- Parent organization: American Library Association
- Website: molib.org

The Missouri Library Association (MLA) is a professional organization for Missouri's librarians and library workers. It is headquartered in Ballwin, Missouri. It was founded on December 18, 1900, in Columbia, Missouri, at a meeting called by Fredrick Crunden, Head Librarian for the St. Louis Public Library; Carrie Whitney, Director of the Kansas City Public Library; Charles Yeater, Trustee and President of the Board of Directors for the Sedalia Public Library; Purd Wright, Librarian at the St. Joseph Public Library; and James Gerould, University Librarian at the University of Missouri. The organization's first president was Fredrick Crunden.

One of the organizations early goals was the establishment of a state library which was accomplished in 1907. MLA worked to create a librarian certification program, forming a Certification Board in 1934.

== See also ==
- List of libraries in the United States
