= Edmond Jacques Eckel =

American architect

Edmond J. Eckel
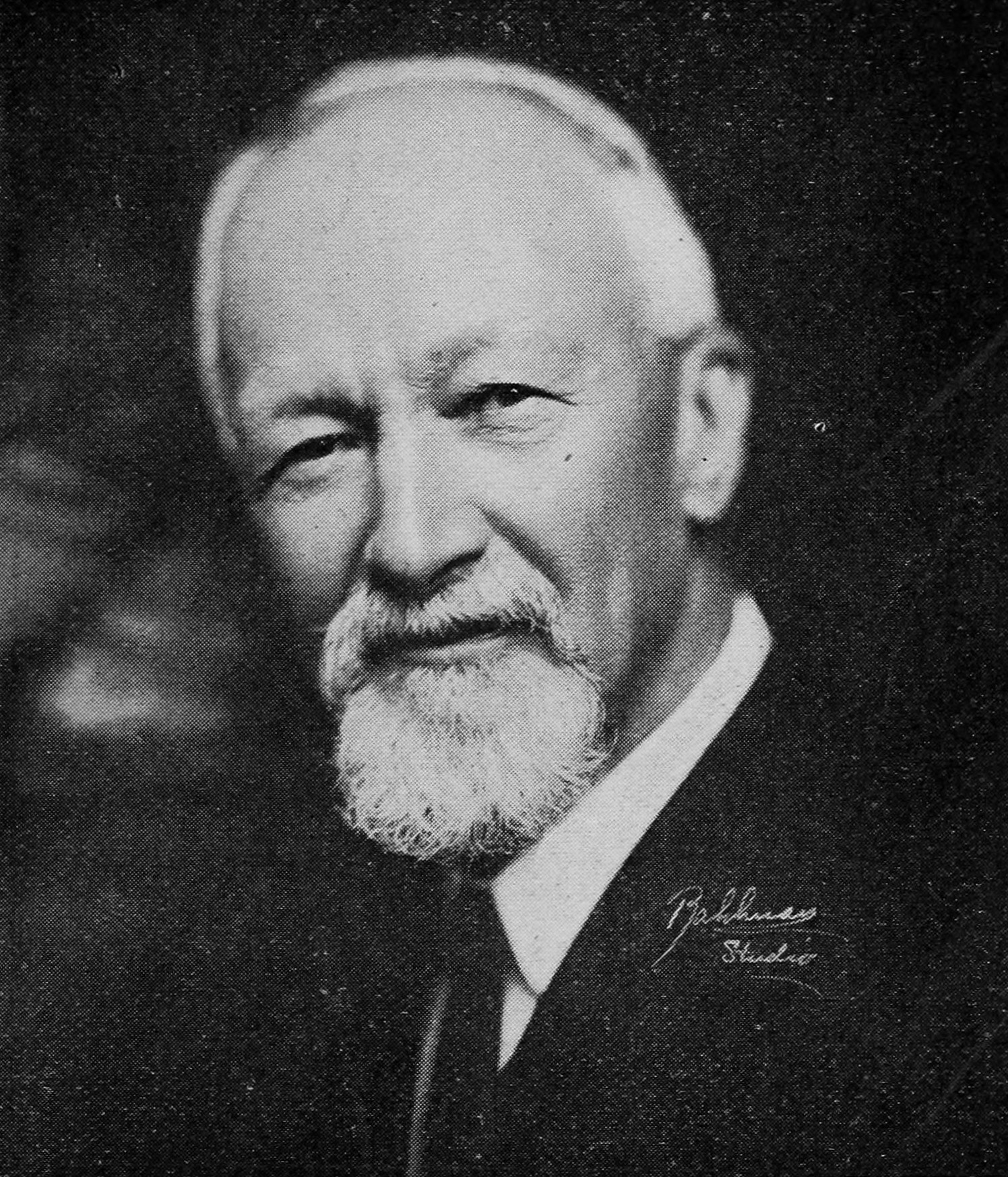
- Edmond J. Eckel, circa 1915
- Born: June 22, 1845; Strasbourg, Alsace, France
- Died: December 12, 1934 (aged 89); St. Joseph, Missouri
- Occupation: Architect
- Awards: Fellow, American Institute of Architects (1889)

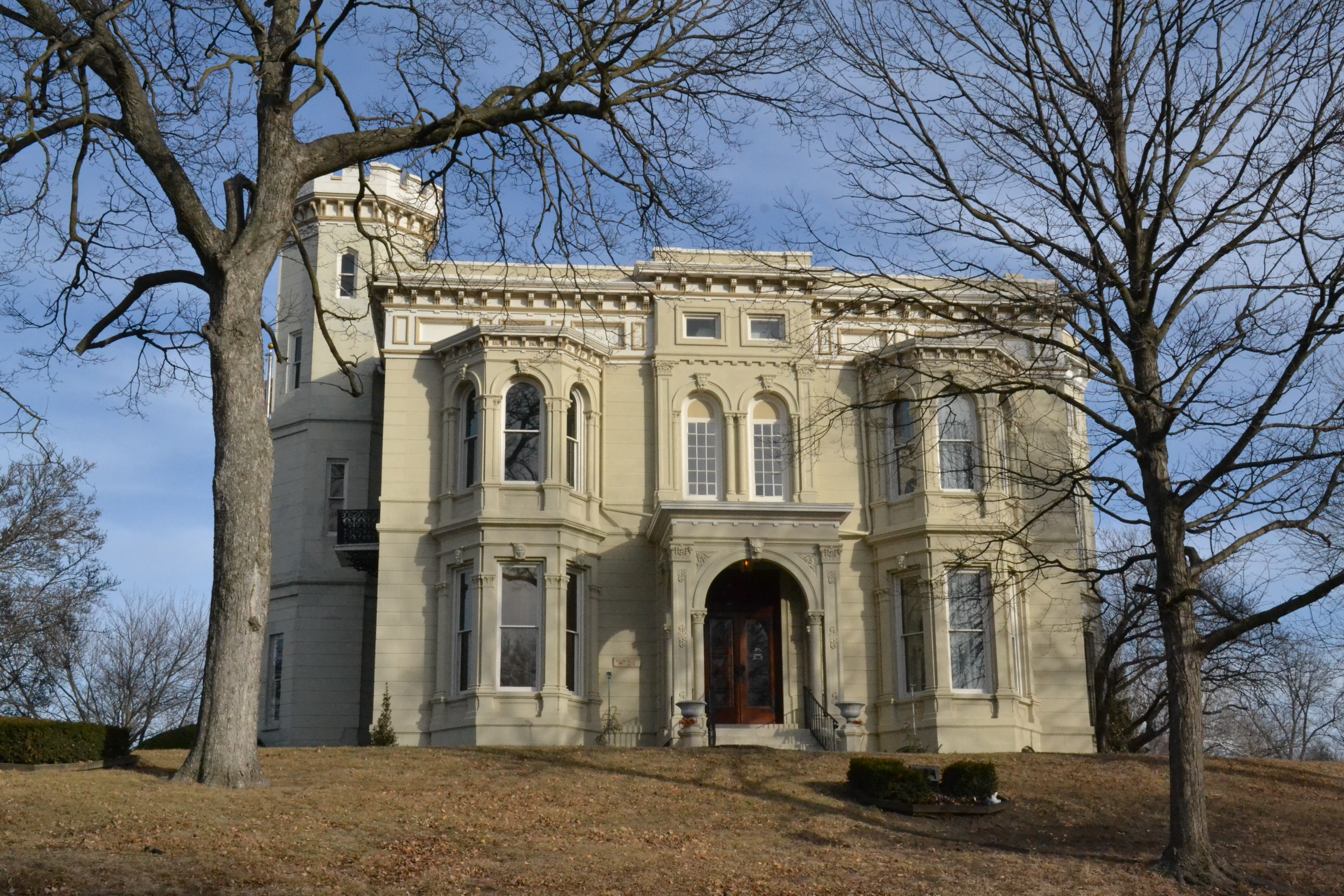
The house of William Wyeth, now known as the Wyeth-Tootle Mansion, in St. Joseph, designed by Boettner & Eckel and completed in 1879.

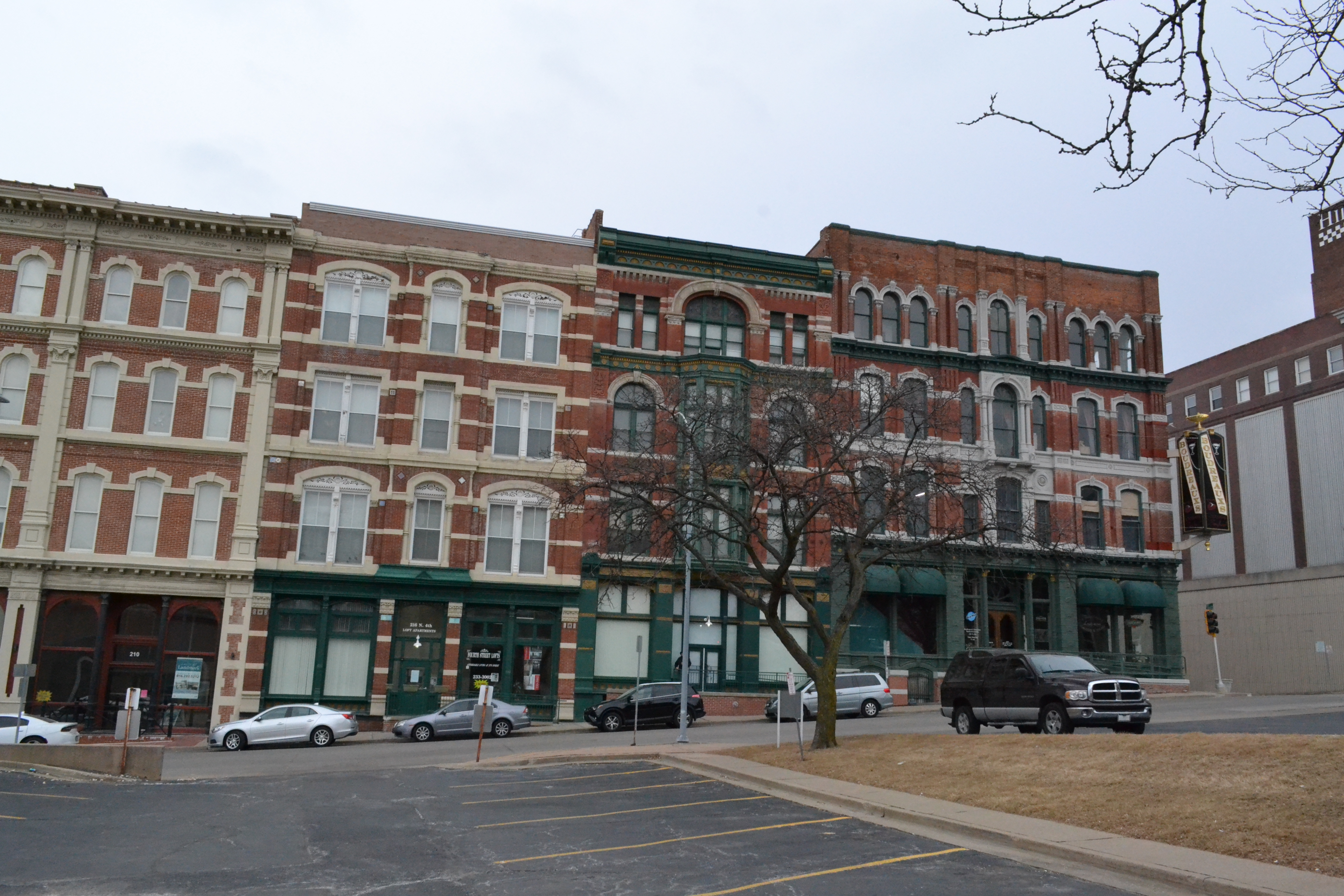
The buildings of Wholesale Row in St. Joseph, designed by Eckel & Mann for several clients and built between 1880 and 1884.

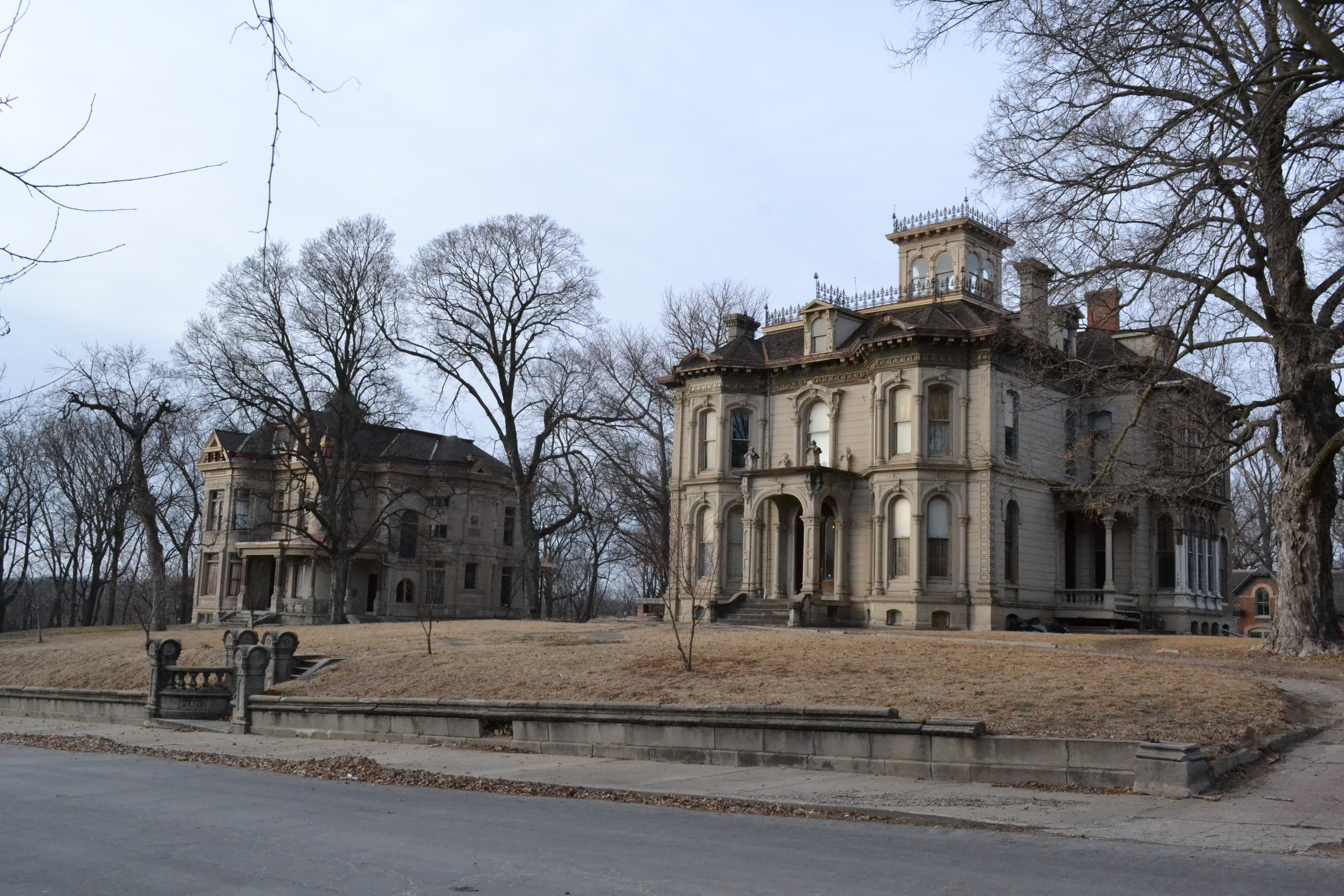
The houses of Adam N. Schuster (right) and James H. Robison (left) in St. Joseph, designed by Eckel & Mann and completed in 1881 and 1888, respectively.

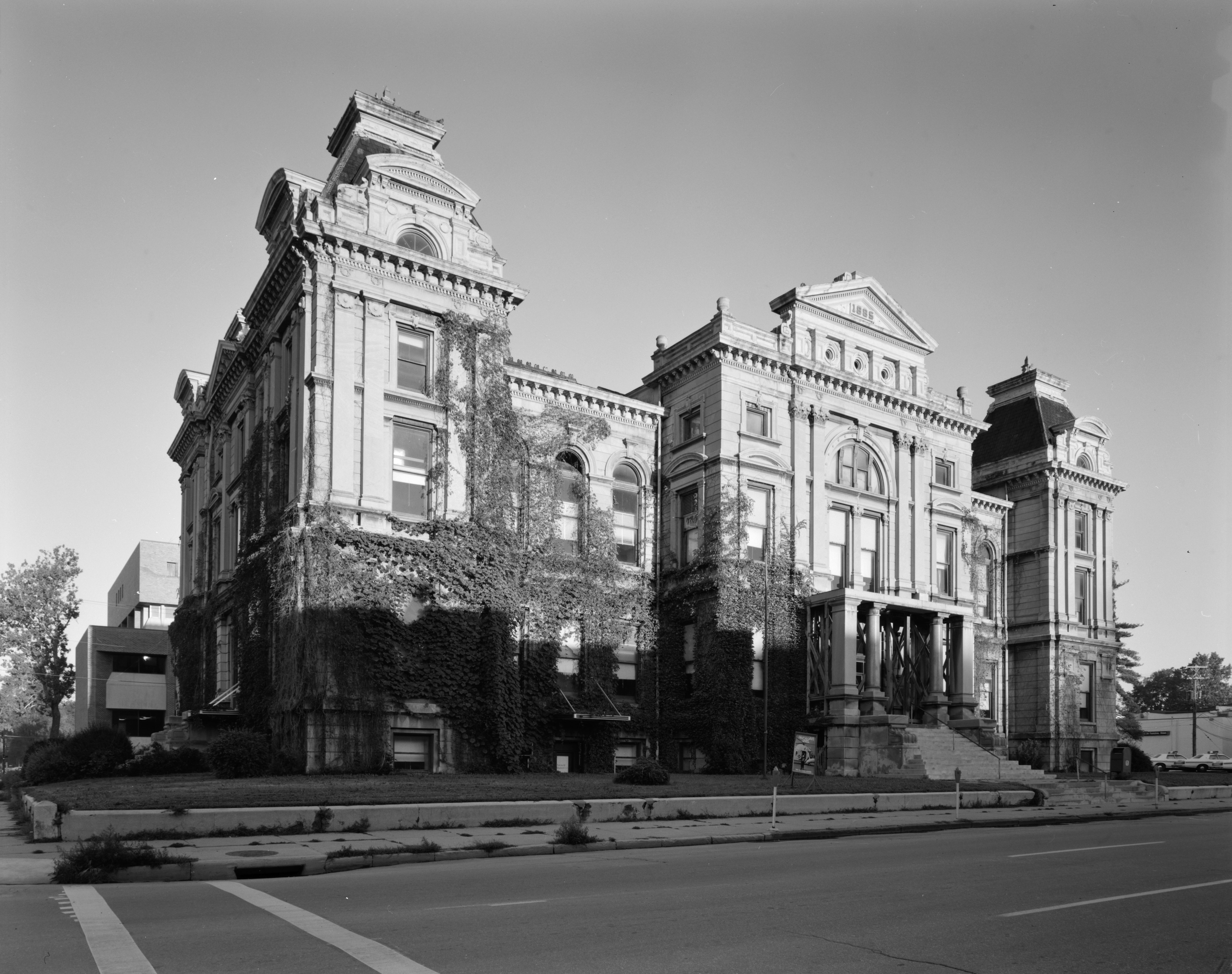
The former Pottawattamie County Courthouse in Council Bluffs, Iowa, designed by Eckel & Mann and completed in 1888.

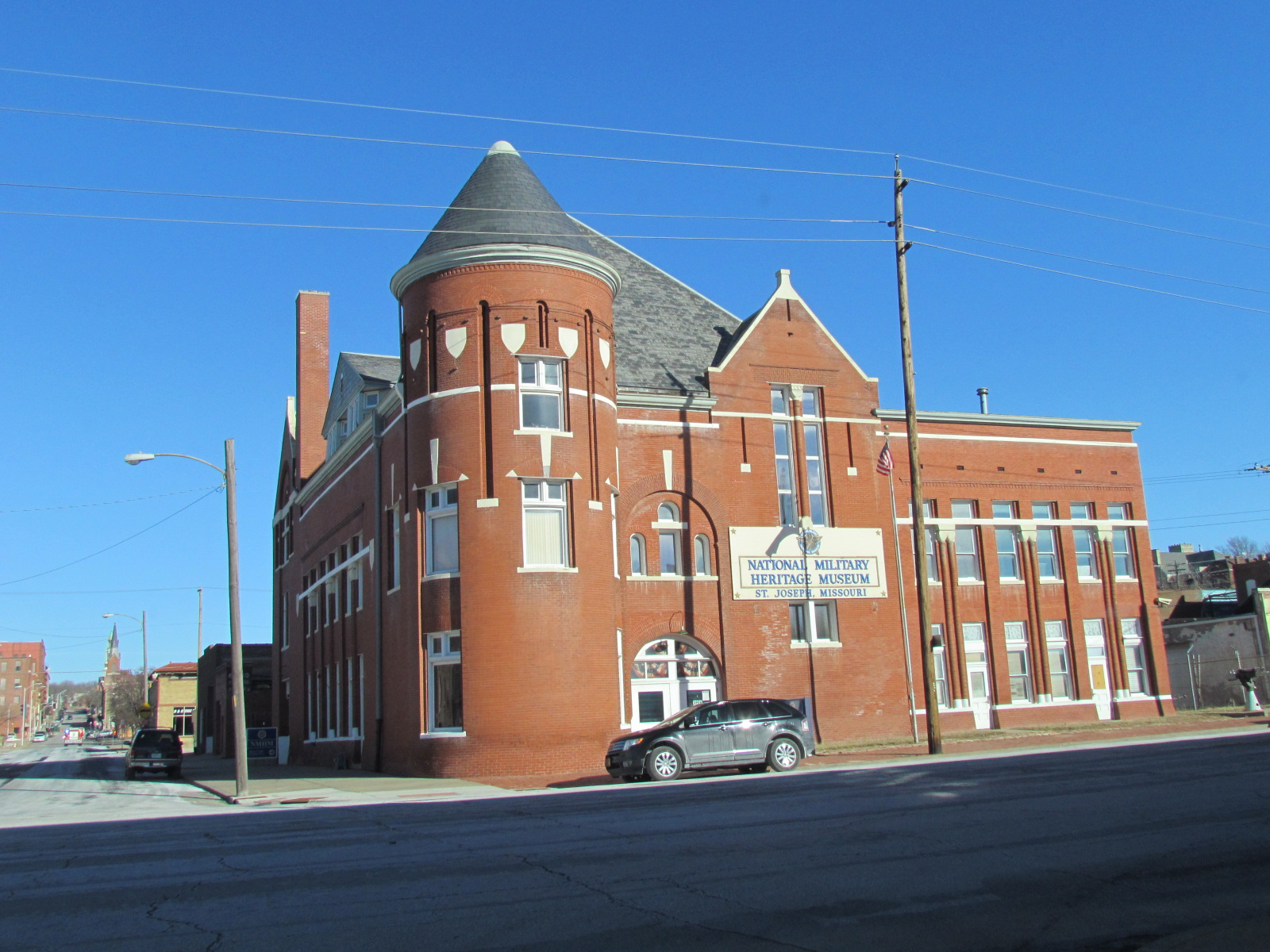
The former Central Police Station in St. Joseph, designed by Eckel & Mann and completed in 1891.

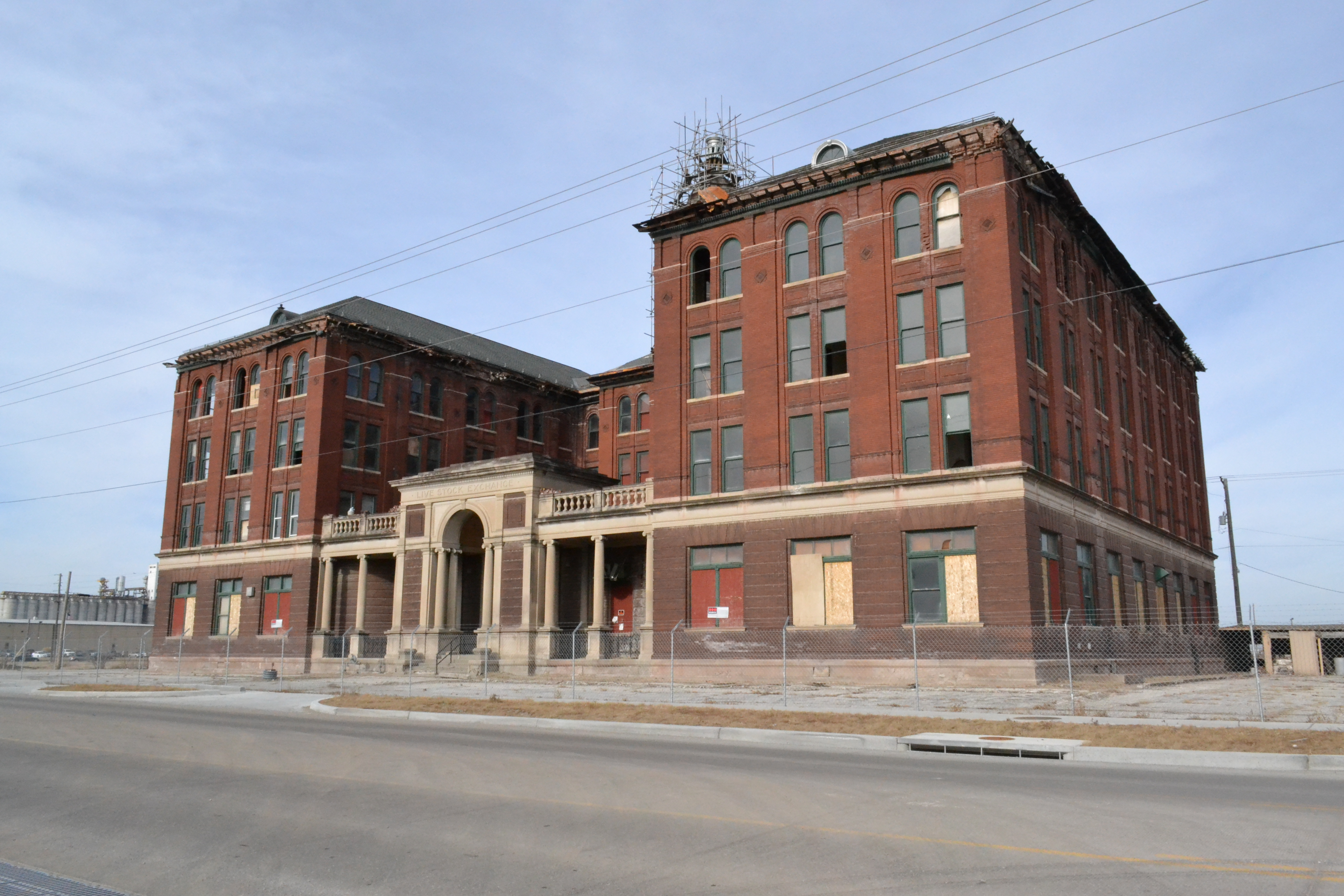
The Livestock Exchange Building in St. Joseph, designed by Eckel and completed in 1899.

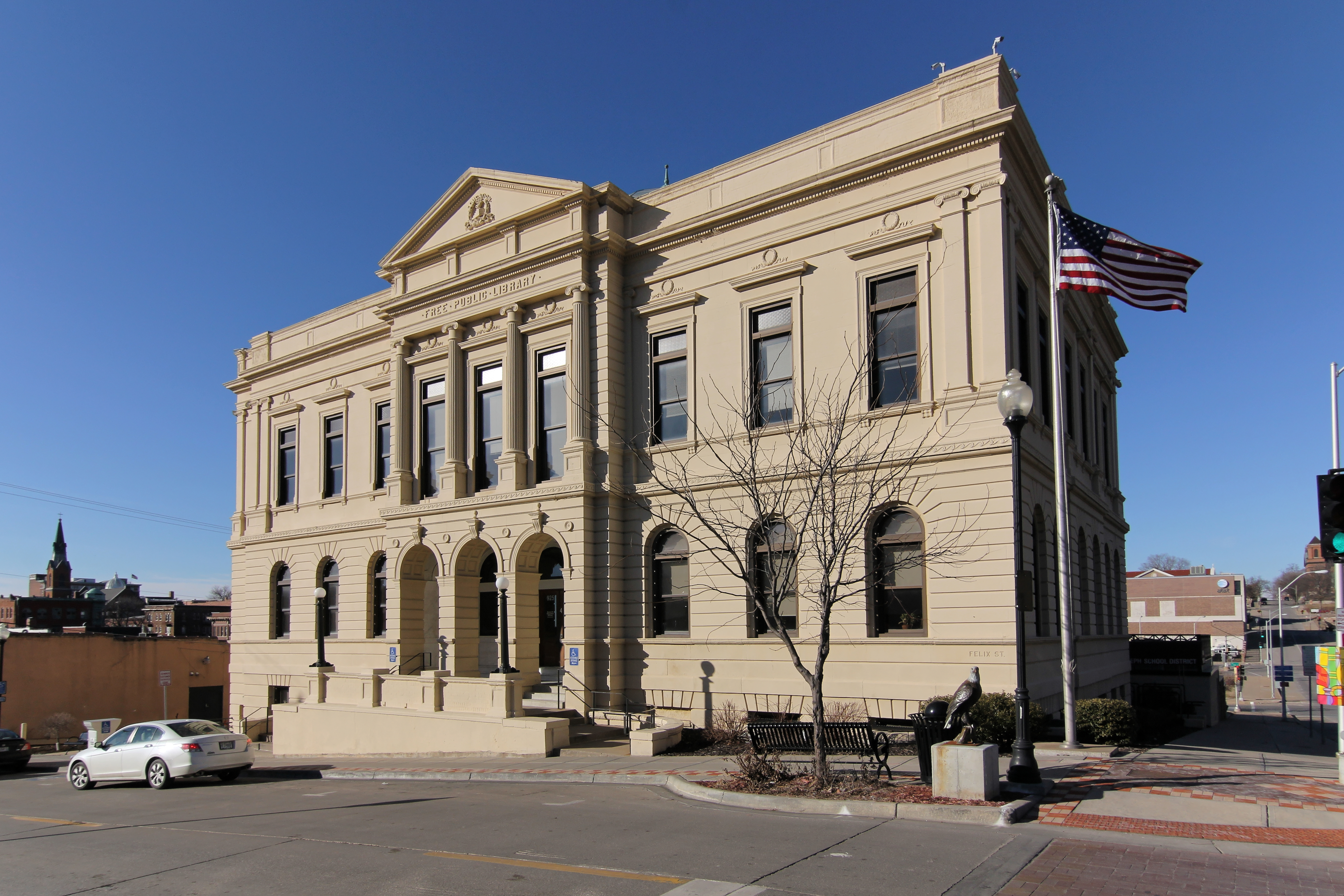
The downtown branch of the St. Joseph Public Library, designed by Eckel and completed in 1902.

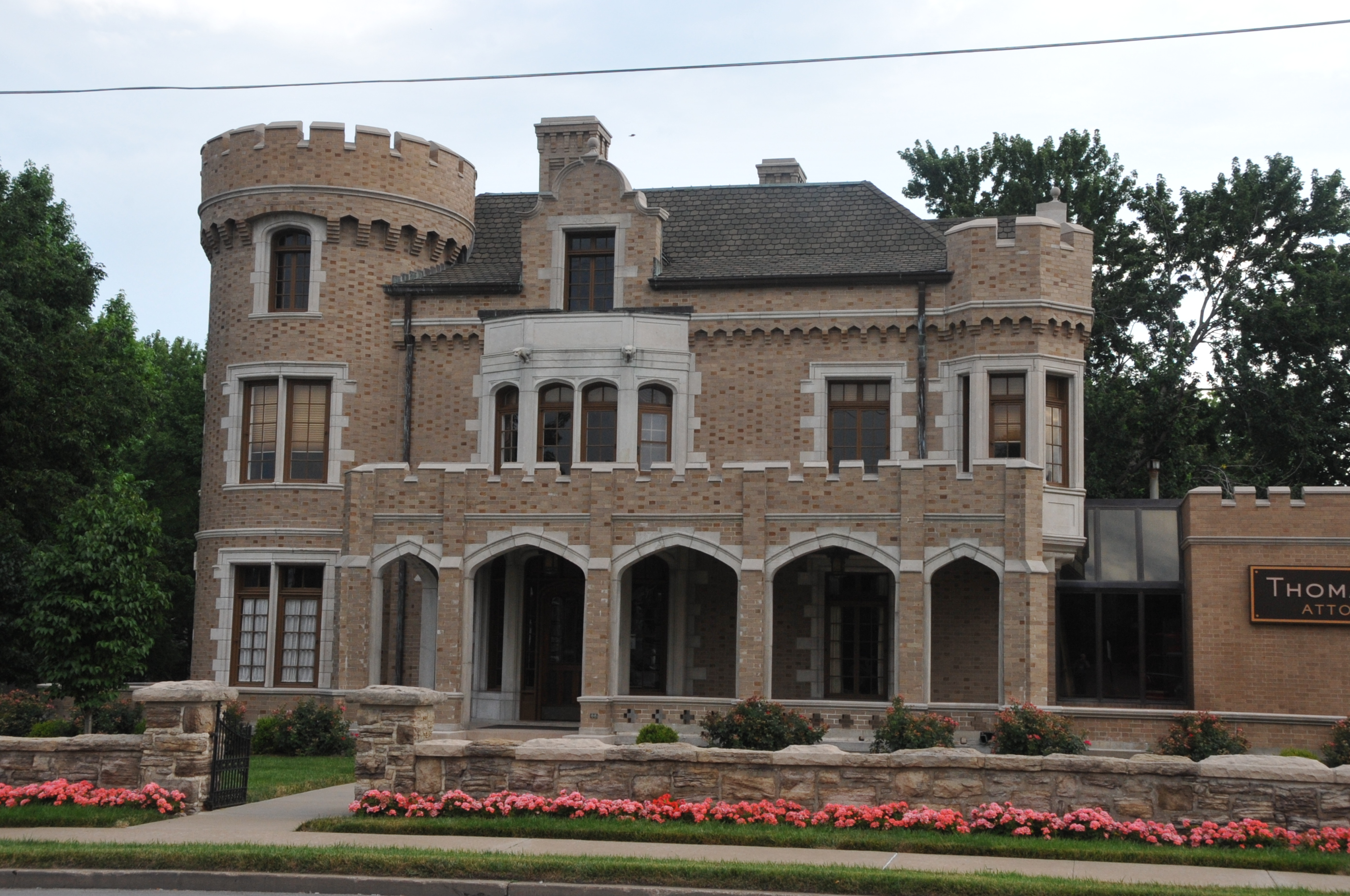
The Dr. Jacob Geiger House-Maud Wyeth Painter House in St. Joseph, designed by Eckel & Aldrich and completed in 1912.

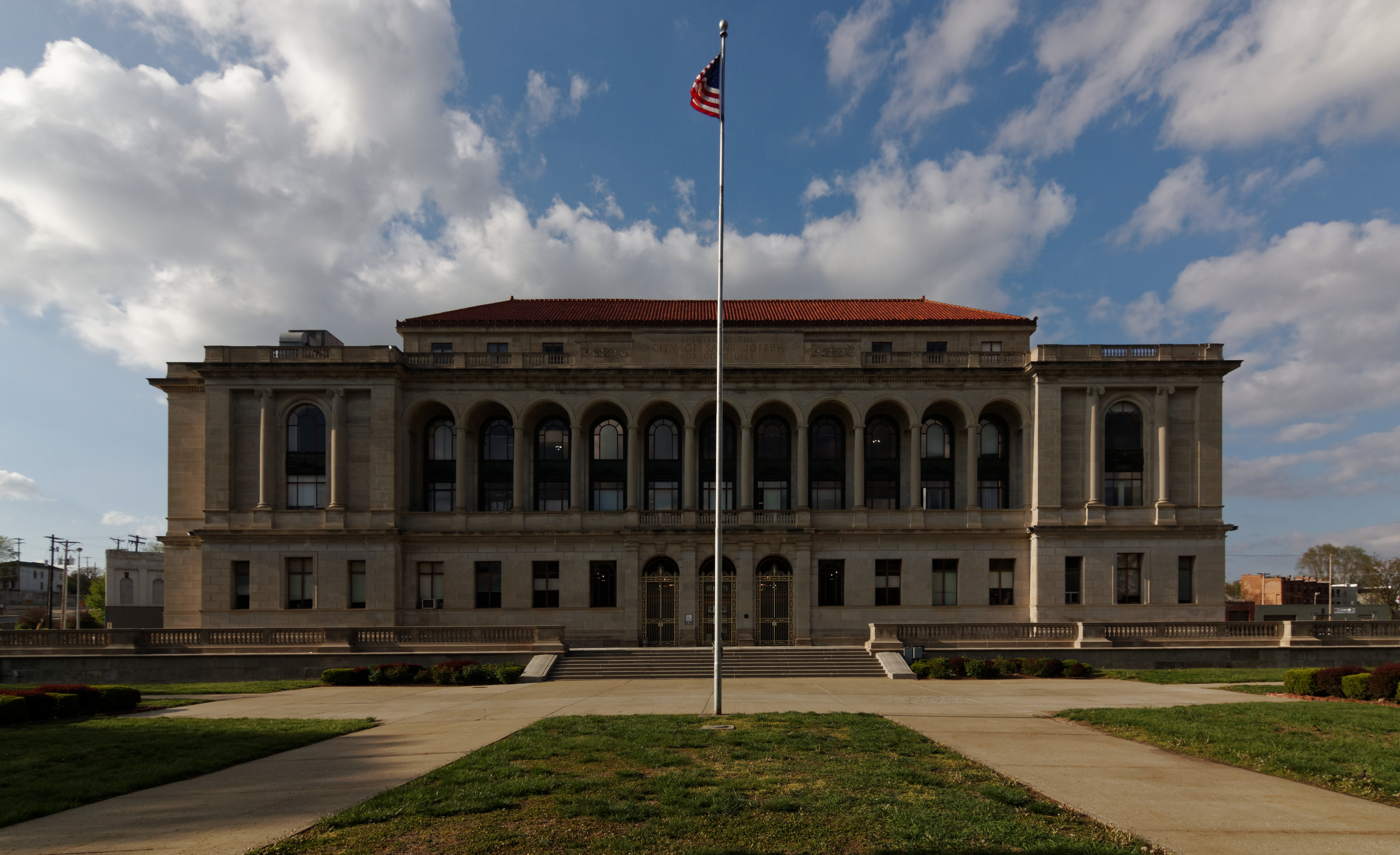
The St. Joseph City Hall, designed by Eckel & Aldrich and completed in 1927.

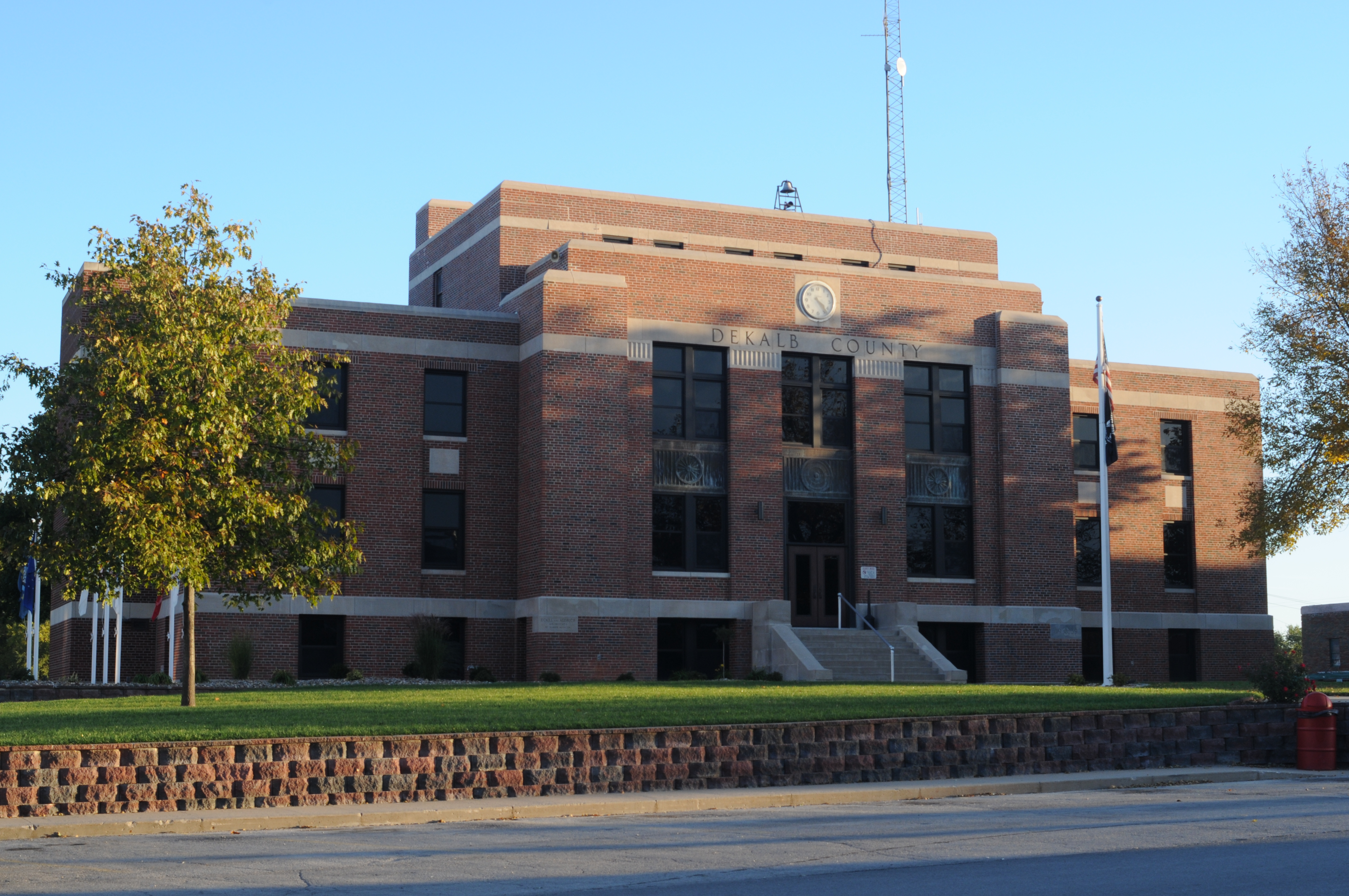
The DeKalb County Courthouse in Maysville, Missouri, designed by Eckel & Aldrich and completed in 1939.

Edmond J. Eckel FAIA (June 22, 1845 – December 12, 1934) was an architect in practice in St. Joseph, Missouri, from 1872 until his death in 1934. In 1880 he was the founder of Eckel & Mann, later Eckel & Aldrich and Brunner & Brunner, which was the oldest architectural firm in Missouri prior to its eventual dissolution in 1999.

== Life and career ==
Edmond Jacques Eckel was born June 22, 1845, in Strasbourg, Alsace, France, to Jacques Eckel, a manufacturer, and Louise Elizabeth Caroline (Schweighaeuser) Eckel. He was educated at what is now the Jean Sturm Gymnasium and studied architecture under the city architect of Strasbourg. In 1863 he moved to Paris to continue his education and studied in the Beaux-Arts ateliers of Alexis Paccard and Léon Vaudoyer. He was admitted to the second, or junior, class of the Ecole de Beaux-Arts in 1866 but left without graduating in 1868. Eckel then immigrated to the United States and lived first in New York City and Cleveland. In 1869 he decided to move on to Kansas City, Missouri, but a railroad layover in St. Joseph, about fifty miles north of Kansas City, prompted him to stay and settle. He worked as a drafter for local architects Patrick F. Meagher and Stigers & Boettner before briefly opening his own office in 1872. He returned to Stigers & Boettner in 1874 as a junior partner and in 1877, upon the retirement of the senior partner, a full partner in Boettner & Eckel.

In 1880 Boettner and Eckel dissolved their partnership, and Eckel formed a new firm, Eckel & Mann, with George R. Mann, a former employee of Boettner & Eckel. Circa 1888 they were joined by Harvey Ellis, an itinerant designer from Rochester, New York. Ellis excerted a large influence on his employers and has been credited with the design of the German-American Bank Building (1889) and had a part in the firm's competition-winning design for the St. Louis City Hall. Mann and Ellis moved to St. Louis to manage the project, and Eckel and Mann dissolved their partnership in 1892. Eckel briefly formed the partnership of Eckel & van Brunt with John van Brunt, an architect from Kansas City, but this was dissolved within a few months. Eckel then worked as a sole practitioner until 1908, when he formed the partnership of Eckel & Boschen with Walter Boschen, a young architect from New York City. This was dissolved in 1910 and Eckel formed another partnership, Eckel & Aldrich, with George R. Eckel, his son, and Will S. Aldrich, a former employee of McKim, Mead & White. In 1920 Eckel stepped down as the firm's senior partner, but he remained involved in the firm's projects until his death in 1934.

Eckel joined the Western Association of Architects (WAA) in 1885 as a fellow. When the WAA was merged into the American Institute of Architects (AIA) in 1889, Eckel became a fellow of the AIA. In 1912 he was a founder of the short-lived St. Joseph Society of Architects and served as its first president.

== Personal life ==
Eckel was married in 1875 to Minnie Louise Schroers in St. Joseph. They had four children: Edmond George Eckel, Minnie Albertine (Eckel) Agnew, Elvie Emilie (Eckel) Forgrave and George Robert Eckel. His home, built in St. Joseph in 1885, was listed on the National Register of Historic Places in 1980 but has been demolished. He was a member of the Masons, the Elks, the Benton Club and the St. Joseph Country Club. Eckel died December 12, 1934, in St. Joseph at the age of 89.

== Legacy ==
During his career Eckel was the leading architect in St. Joseph and was well-known throughout the state and the region. During a career spanning over sixty years, Eckel was responsible for major works in the eclectic styles of the Gilded Age. He embraced the revival of Neoclassical architecture brought on by the World's Columbian Exposition of 1893 and was thereafter responsible for a number of works informed by his Beaux-Arts education, including the Livestock Exchange Building (1899), the St. Joseph Public Library (1902) and the St. Joseph City Hall (1927), among others. In 1912 Eckel & Aldrich were the only Missouri architects invited to participate in the second competition to design the Missouri State Capitol, and in 1927 were again the only Missourians invited to participate in a similar competition for the Milwaukee County Courthouse.

Eckel's firm outlived his death by over sixty years. Eckel & Aldrich continued under the leadership of Aldrich and the younger Eckel until their deaths in 1947 and 1959, respectively. In 1960 the firm was reorganized as Brunner & Brunner by their associate, Otto Brunner (1896–1974), and his son William A. Brunner (1930–2014). When Brunner & Brunner was dissolved in 1999 it was the oldest architectural firm in practice in Missouri. (Note: The referenced list of firms contains two relevant errors. It gives a founding date of 1872 for Brunner & Brunner rather than 1880, the year Eckel established his own office, and includes the Austin Company of Kansas City with a founding date of 1878. The Austin Company was established as a contractor and did not incorporate a design practice until 1904.) The firm's assets were acquired by River Bluff Architects, who in 2008 donated Eckel and Brunner's papers to the St. Joseph Museums, where several of Eckel's drawings are exhibited. River Bluff Architects suspended practice c. 2020 and was administratively dissolved by the State of Missouri in 2022.

A number of Eckel's and the firms' works are listed on the United States National Register of Historic Places, with various spelling errors.

== Architectural works ==
=== Stigers, Boettner & Company, 1874–1877 ===
- Christ Episcopal Church, (Note: A contributing resource to the St. Joseph's Commerce and Banking Historic District, NRHP-listed in 2001.) 207 N 7th St, St. Joseph, Missouri (1877)

=== Boettner & Eckel, 1877–1880 ===
- William Wyeth house, (Note: A contributing resource to the Museum Hill Historic District, NRHP-listed in 1991.) 1100 Charles St, St. Joseph, Missouri (1879)

=== Eckel & Mann, 1880–1892 ===
- Wholesale Row, 210, 216, 218 and 224 N 4th St, St. Joseph, Missouri (1880, 1884, 1880 and 1882, NRHP 1977)
- Adam N. Schuster house, (Note: A contributing resource to the Hall Street Historic District, NRHP-listed in 1979.) 703 Hall St, St. Joseph, Missouri (1881)
- Atchison County Courthouse, 400 S Washington St, Rock Port, Missouri (1882–83)
- Nodaway County Courthouse, Maryville, Missouri (1882–83, NRHP 1979)
- James P. Hamilton house, 1218 Main St, Bethany, Missouri (1882, NRHP 1985)
- Ringgold County Courthouse, 109 W Madison St, Mount Ayr, Iowa (1883, demolished)
- Gentry County Courthouse, Albany, Missouri (1884–85)
- DeKalb County Courthouse, Maysville, Missouri (1885, demolished 1938)
- Edmond Jacques Eckel House, (Note: Formerly a contributing resource to the Robidoux Hill Historic District, NRHP-listed in 1989.) 515 N 4th St, St. Joseph, Missouri (1885, NRHP 1980, demolished)
- Nathan P. and Elmarine Ogden house, (Note: Presently a bed and breakfast known as Shakespeare Chateau.) 809 Hall St, St. Joseph, Missouri (1885)
- Pottawattamie County Courthouse, 227 S 6th St, Council Bluffs, Iowa (1885–88, demolished)
- C. D. Smith building, (Note: A contributing resource to the South Fourth Street Commercial Historic District, NRHP-listed in 1991.) 313 S 3rd St, St. Joseph, Missouri (1888)
- Virginia Flats, 520-528 N 10th St, St. Joseph, Missouri (1888, NRHP 1992)
- German-American Bank Building, 108 S 7th St, St. Joseph, Missouri (1889, NRHP 1978)
- James H. Robison house, 631 Hall St, St. Joseph, Missouri (1888)
- James W. Hingston house, 537 N 8th St, St. Joseph, Missouri (1888)
- Samuel Nave house, (Note: A contributing resource to the Kemper Addition Historic District, NRHP-listed in 2002.) 2121 Clay St, St. Joseph, Missouri (1889–91)
- Central Police Station, 701 Messanie St, St. Joseph, Missouri (1890–91, NRHP 2009)
- Alfred T. Smith house, 802 Hall St, St. Joseph, Missouri (1890)
- St. Louis City Hall, St. Louis, Missouri (1890–1904)
- Herschel Bartlett house, 537 N 8th St, St. Joseph, Missouri (1891)

=== Eckel & van Brunt, 1892 ===
- John D. Richardson Dry Goods Company, (Note: A contributing resource to the Central-North Commercial Historic District, NRHP-listed in 1991.) St. Joseph, Missouri (1892, NRHP 1982)

=== Edmond J. Eckel, 1892–1910 ===
- George Hoagland building, 107 S 6th St, St. Joseph, Missouri (1892)
- Henry Krug Jr. house, (Note: A contributing resource to the Krug Park Place Historic District, NRHP-listed in 2002.) 1105 Krug Park Pl, St. Joseph, Missouri (1892)
- Telephone Building, 116 S 7th St, St. Joseph, Missouri (1895)
- First Baptist Church, 1225 Francis St, St. Joseph, Missouri (1896)
- Livestock Exchange Building, 601 Illinois Ave, St. Joseph, Missouri (1898–99, NRHP 2004)
- J. G. Schneider house, 1125 Krug Park Pl, St. Joseph, Missouri (1899)
- David L. Bartlett Jr. house, 1923 Clay St, St. Joseph, Missouri (1900)
- City Hose Company No. 9, 2217 Frederick Ave, St. Joseph, Missouri (1901, NRHP 1985)
- Samuel and Pauline Peery house, 1105 N Hundley St, Albany, Missouri (1901, NRHP 2005)
- St. Joseph Public Library, St. Joseph, Missouri (1901–02, NRHP 1982)
- Miller-Porter-Lacy House alterations, St. Joseph, Missouri (1902, NRHP 1982)
- St. Joseph Public Library-Carnegie Branch, St. Joseph, Missouri (1902, NRHP 1999)
- Carnegie Library of Albany, Albany, Missouri (1905–06, NRHP 1990)
- Carnegie Library, William Jewell College, Liberty, Missouri (1908, demolished)
- Queen of the Apostles Roman Catholic Church, 501 S 10th St, St. Joseph, Missouri (1908)

=== Eckel & Boschen, 1908–1910 ===
- Robidoux School, 201 S 10th St, St. Joseph, Missouri (1908–09, NRHP 1983)
- Neely Elementary School alterations, St. Joseph, Missouri (1909)

=== Eckel & Aldrich, 1910–1959 ===
- Dr. Jacob Geiger House-Maud Wyeth Painter House, St. Joseph, Missouri (1911–12, NRHP 1986)
- Benton Calkins house, 1150 Krug Park Pl, St. Joseph, Missouri (1915)
- United Building, 602 Felix St, St. Joseph, Missouri (1917–18)
- L. B. Stivers house, 1109 Magnolia Ave, St. Joseph, Missouri (1921)
- Biscuit Company Lofts, 1855 Industrial St, Los Angeles (1925)
- St. Joseph City Hall, St. Joseph, Missouri (1926–27)
- Corby–Forsee Building addition, St. Joseph, Missouri (1927, NRHP 1980)
- DeKalb County Courthouse, Maysville, Missouri (1938–39, NRHP 1998)
- Fire Station No. 5 (former), 1204 S 11th St, (Note: A contributing resource to the Patee Town Historic District, NRHP-listed in 2002.) St. Joseph, Missouri (1939)

== See also ==
- Edmond Jacques Eckel Papers 1860-1952 (K0258), State Historical Society of Missouri
- Eckel Collection, St. Joseph Museums
