= St. Joseph Public Library-Carnegie Branch =

- U.S. National Register of Historic Places
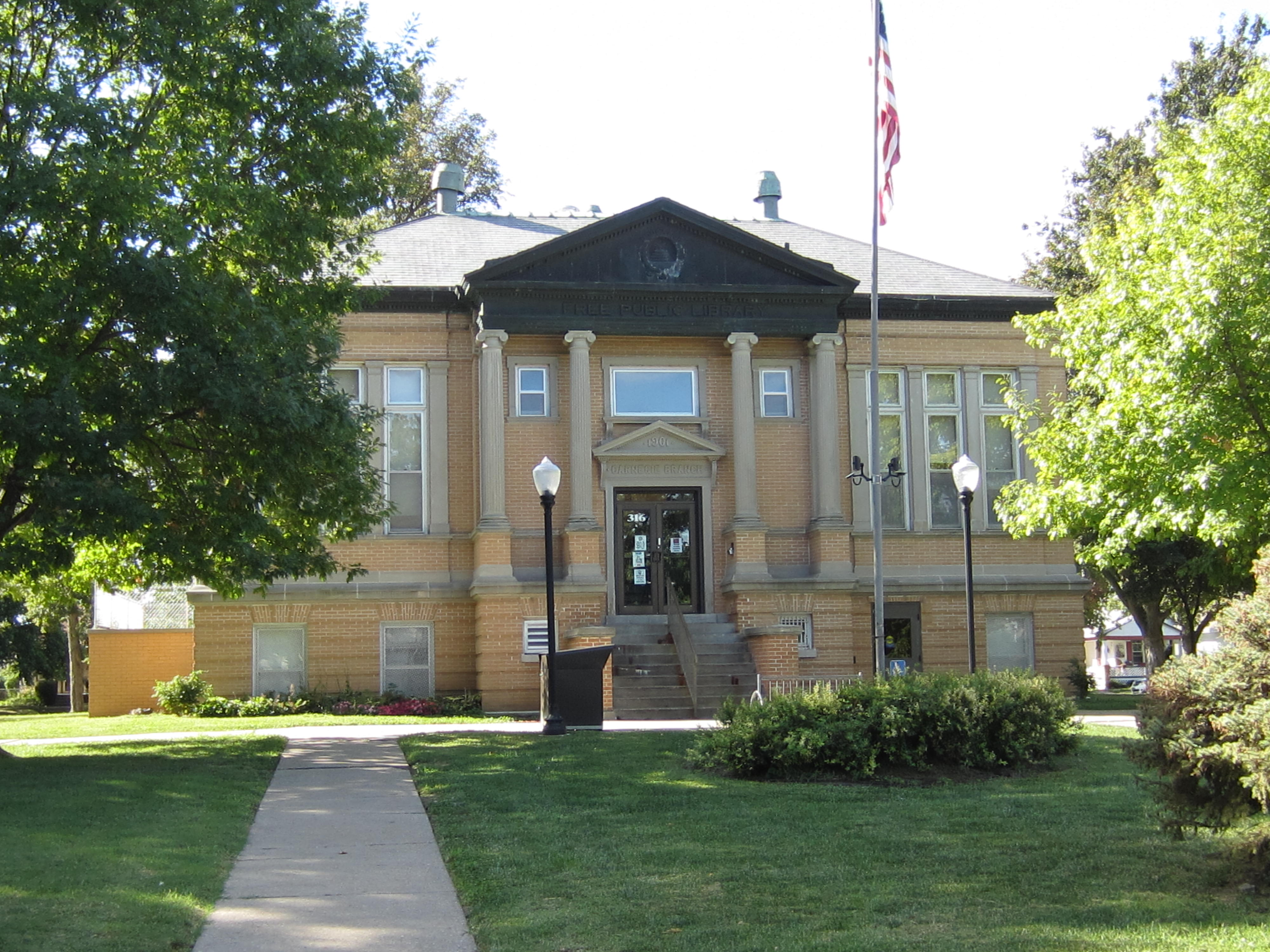
- St. Joseph Public Library-Carnegie Branch, September 2013

- Location within Missouri Location within the United States
- Location: 316 Massachusetts St., St. Joseph, Missouri
- Coordinates: 39°42′58″N 94°51′58″W
- Area: less than one acre
- Architect: Eckel, Edmund J.
- Architectural style: Classical Revival
- NRHP reference No.: 99000595
- Added to NRHP: May 20, 1999

St. Joseph Public Library-Carnegie Branch is a historic Carnegie Library building located at St. Joseph, Missouri. It was designed by the architect Edmond Jacques Eckel (1845–1934) and built in 1902 in the Classical Revival style. It is a one-story, brick and limestone building over a raised basement. It features a projecting front portico with four fluted Ionic order limestone columns. It was built with a $50,000 grant from the Carnegie Foundation.

It was listed on the National Register of Historic Places in 1999.
