= Hamilton House (Bethany, Missouri) =

Historic house in the United States

- U.S. National Register of Historic Places
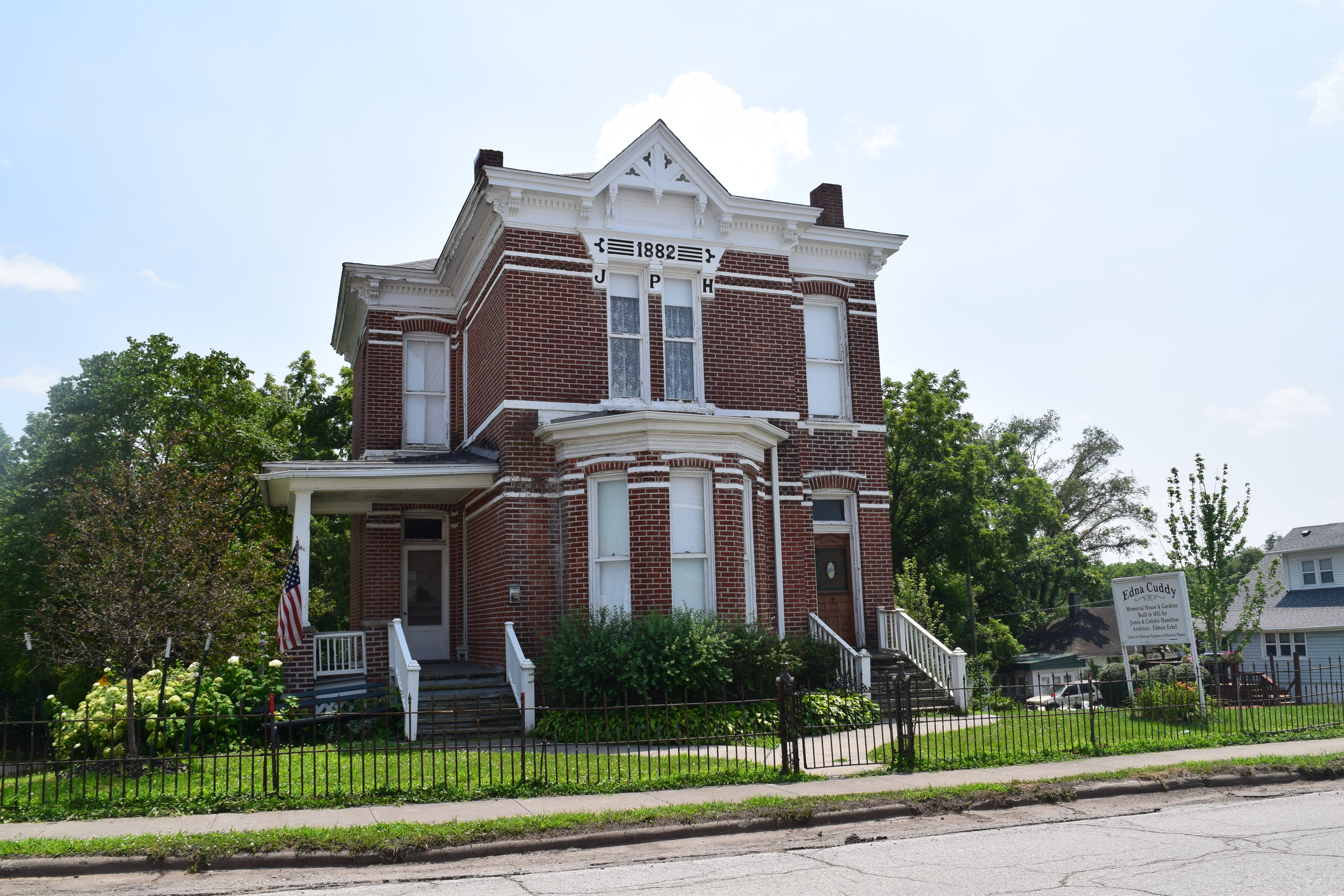

- Location within Missouri Location within the United States
- Location: 1228 W. Main, Bethany, Missouri
- Coordinates: 40°16′6″N 94°2′17″W
- Area: 0.5 acres (0.20 ha)
- Built: 1882
- Architect: Edmond Jacques Eckel
- Architectural style: Italianate
- NRHP reference No.: 85000733
- Added to NRHP: April 11, 1985

Hamilton House, also known as the Edna Cuddy Memorial House and Gardens, is a historic home located at Bethany, Harrison County, Missouri. It was designed by architect Edmond Jacques Eckel and built in 1882. It is a two-story, asymmetrical, Italianate style brick dwelling. It has a low, truncated-hip roof with projecting cornice supported by concave, curved brackets. It is open as a historic home by the Harrison County Historical Society.

It was listed on the National Register of Historic Places in 1985.
