= Gentry County Courthouse =

- U.S. National Register of Historic Places
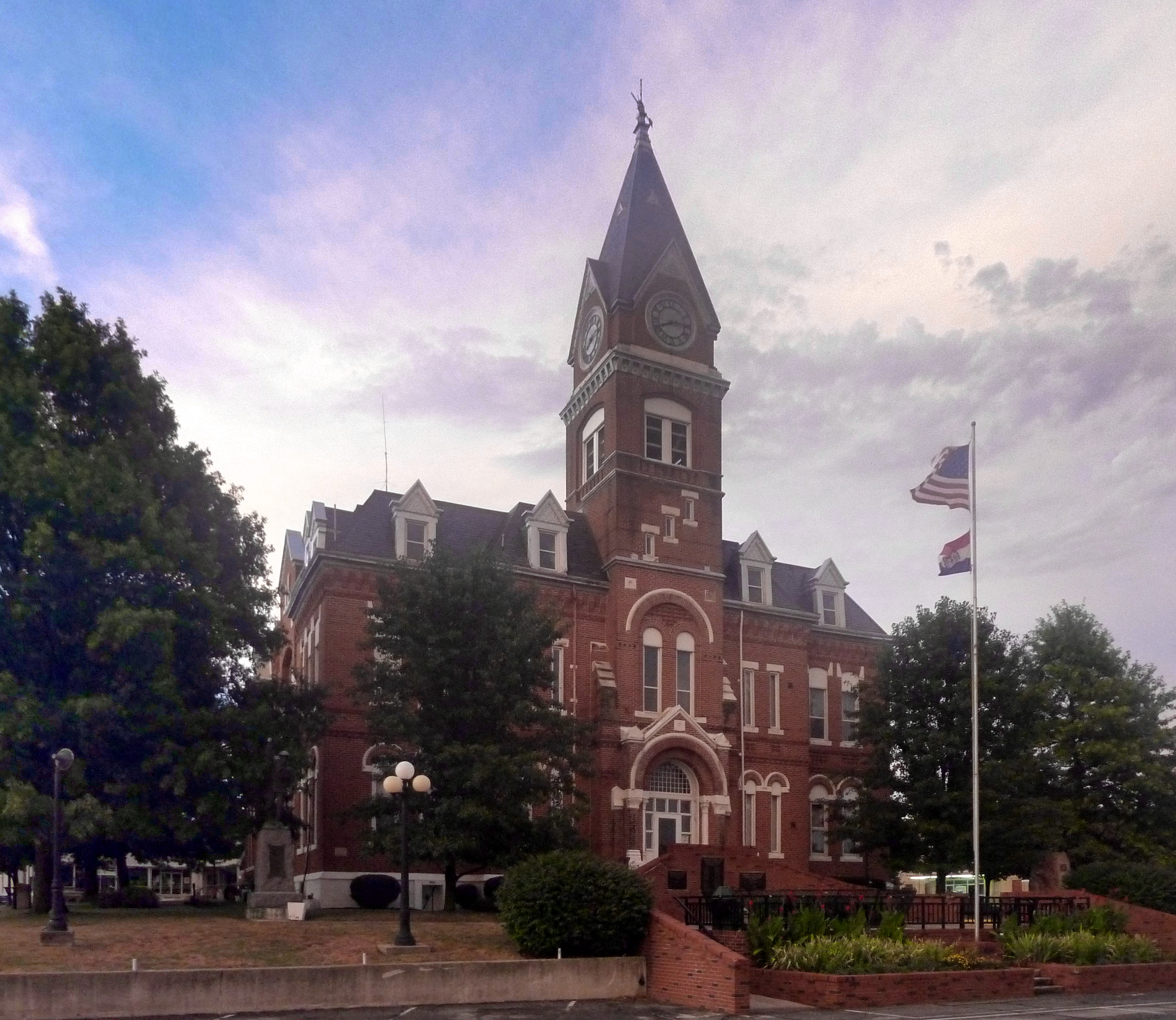
- Gentry County Courthouse, August 2010

- Location within Missouri Location within the United States
- Location: Public Sq., Albany, Missouri
- Coordinates: 40°14′50.9″N 94°19′59.3″W
- Area: less than one acre
- Built: 1884-1885
- Architect: Eckel & Mann
- Architectural style: Late Victorian, Ruskinian Gothic
- NRHP reference No.: 80002352
- Added to NRHP: September 18, 1980

The Gentry County Courthouse is a historic courthouse located at Albany, Gentry County, Missouri. It was designed by the architectural firm Eckel & Mann and built in 1884-1885 by Rufus K. Allen. It is a two-story, High Victorian or Ruskinian Gothic style brick building with a central tower. It has a symmetrical plan, semi-elliptical arches, and a prominent hipped slate roof.

It was listed on the National Register of Historic Places in 1980.
