= City Hose Company No. 9 =

- U.S. National Register of Historic Places
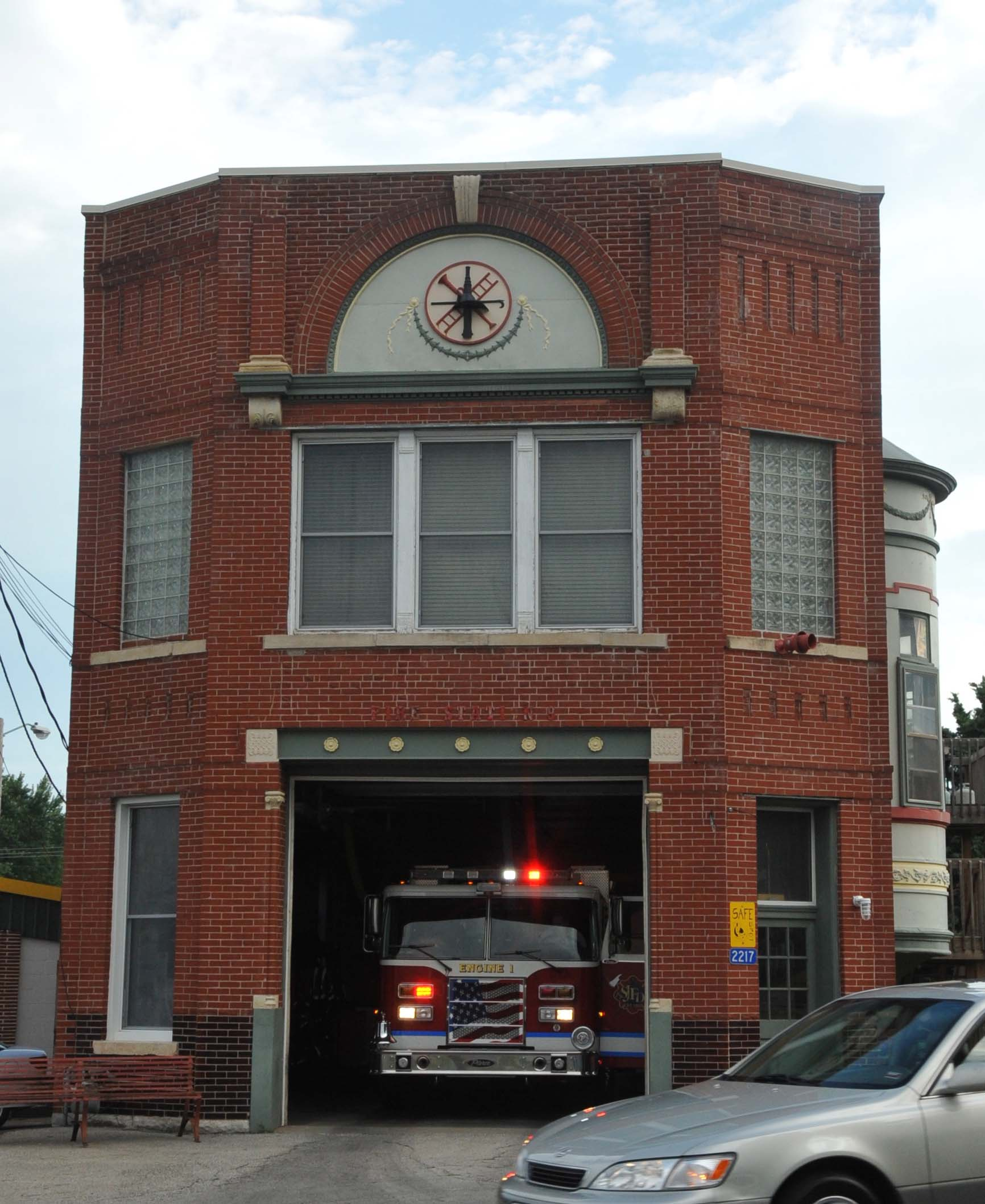
- City Hose Company No. 9, July 2013

- Location within Missouri Location within the United States
- Location: 2217 Frederick Ave., St. Joseph, Missouri
- Coordinates: 39°46′32″N 94°50′0″W
- Area: less than one acre
- Built: 1900
- Architect: Eckel, Edmond J.
- MPS: Frederick Avenue MRA
- NRHP reference No.: 85003357
- Added to NRHP: October 25, 1985

City Hose Company No. 9, also known as City Fire Station No. 9 , is a historic fire station located at St. Joseph, Missouri. It was designed by the architect Edmond Jacques Eckel (1845–1934) and built in 1901. It is a picturesque two-story, brick building and features a decorative oriel window.

It was listed on the National Register of Historic Places in 1985.
