= South Fourth Street Commercial Historic District =

Historic district in Missouri, United States

- U.S. National Register of Historic Places
- U.S. Historic district
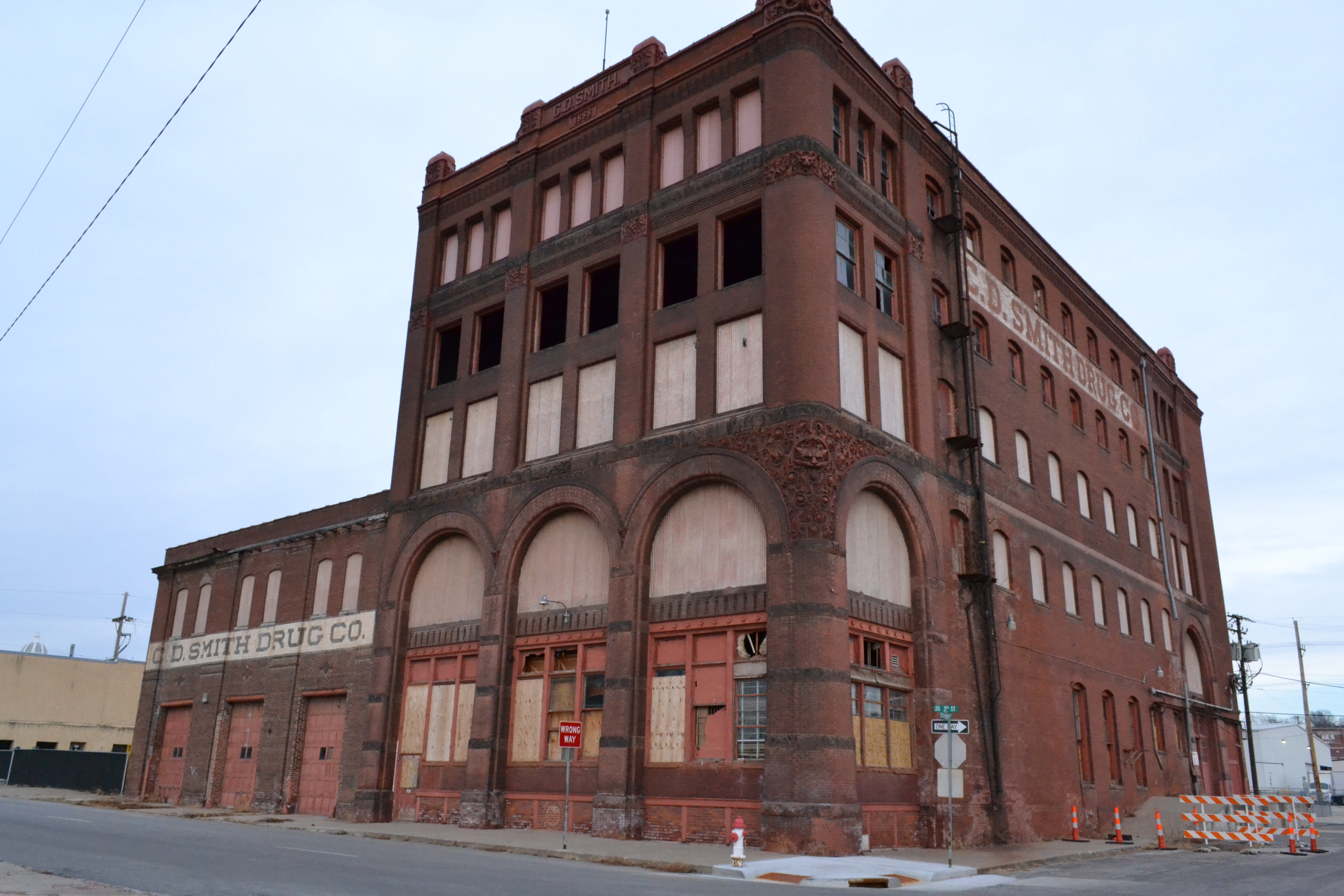

- Location within Missouri Location within the United States
- Location: Roughly bounded by S. 3rd, S. 5th, Charles and Messanie Sts., St. Joseph, Missouri
- Coordinates: 39°45′50″N 94°51′22″W
- Area: 21 acres (8.5 ha)
- Architect: Eckel, Edmund J.; Boschen, Walter
- Architectural style: Classical Revival, Renaissance, Italianate
- MPS: St. Joseph MPS
- NRHP reference No.: 91000124
- Added to NRHP: March 8, 1991

South Fourth Street Commercial Historic District is a national historic district located at St. Joseph, Missouri. The district encompasses 25 contributing buildings in an industrial/commercial section of St. Joseph west of the central business district. It developed between about 1861 and 1929, and includes representative examples of Italianate, Classical Revival, and Renaissance Revival style architecture. Notable buildings include a number of commercial blocks and warehouse/light manufacturing facilities some of which were designed by architect Edmond Jacques Eckel (1845–1934).

It was listed on the National Register of Historic Places in 1991.
