= Neely Elementary School =

- U.S. National Register of Historic Places
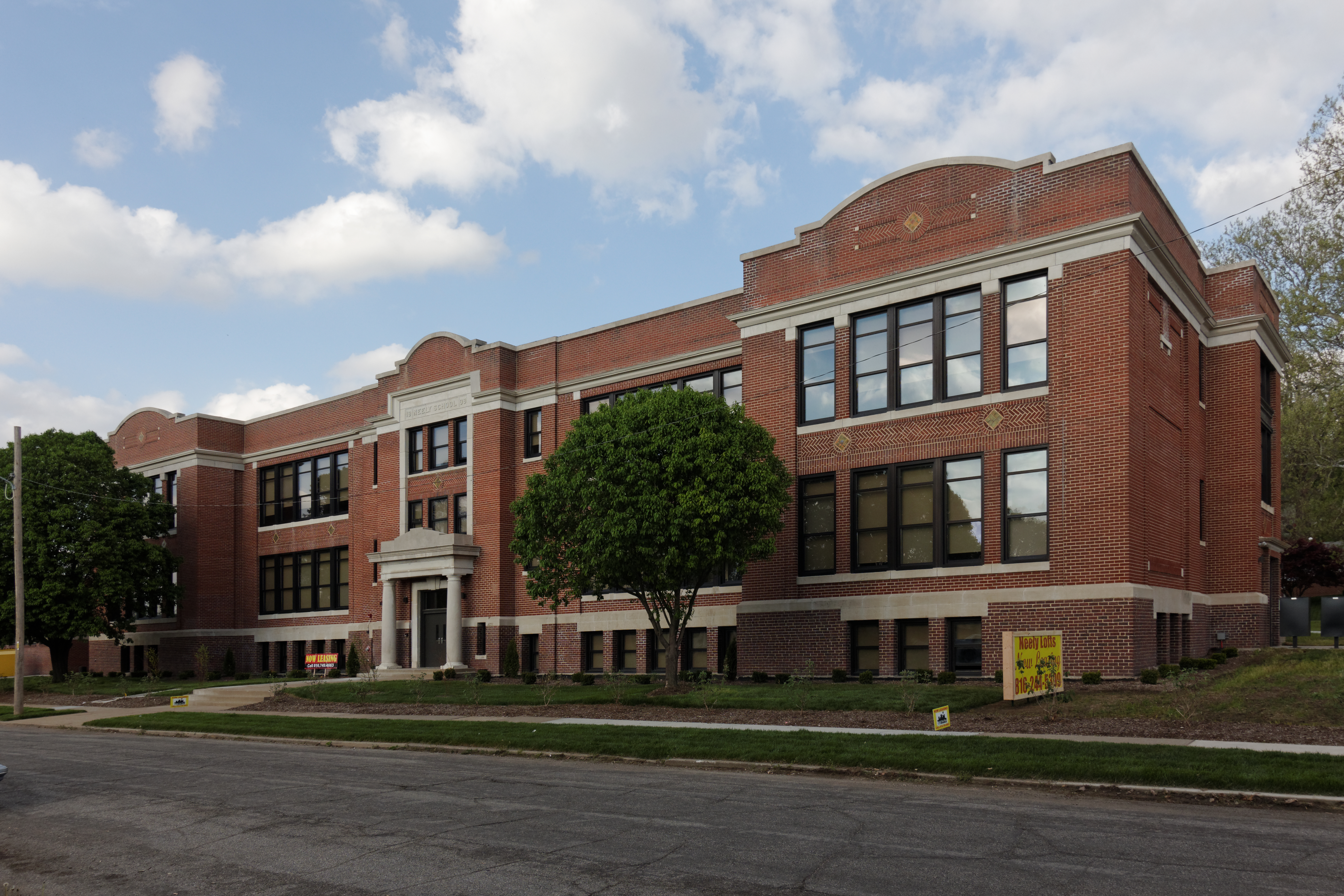
- Neely School Building, April 2016

- Location within Missouri Location within the United States
- Location: 1909 S. 12th St., St. Joseph, Missouri
- Coordinates: 39°44′57″N 94°50′43″W
- Area: 2.09 acres (0.85 ha)
- Built: 1909
- Built by: Buddy, P.P. (1899); P.P. Buddy Building and Construction Co. (1909); Hotchkiss, Sam (1916)
- Architect: Meagher, P.F. (1871); Eckel, E.J. (1899); Eckel and Boschen, (1909); Boschen, Walter (1916); Ittner, William B. (1929)
- Architectural style: Classical Revival
- NRHP reference No.: 14000328
- Added to NRHP: June 23, 2014

Neely Elementary School, also known as Neely School Building, is a historic school building located at St. Joseph, Missouri. The building was originally constructed in 1871, with its earliest extant portions to date from 1894. Additions and major renovations were completed in 1909 and 1916. The school is a two-story brick and limestone building on a raised basement with Classical Revival style design elements. Some of the modifications were designed by architect Edmond Jacques Eckel (1845–1934).

It was listed on the National Register of Historic Places in 2014.
