= Krug Park Place Historic District =

Historic district in Missouri, United States

- U.S. National Register of Historic Places
- U.S. Historic district
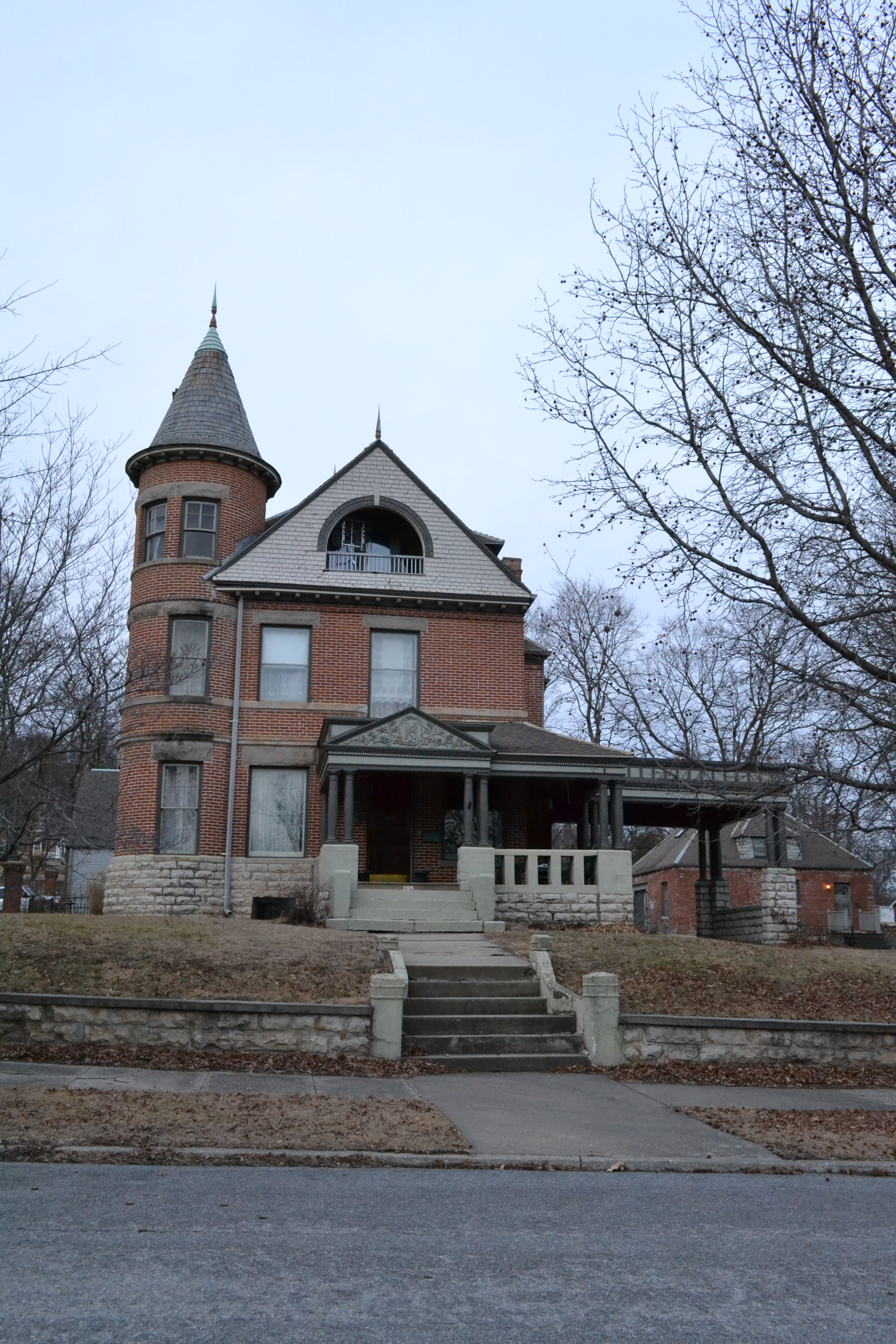
- Krug House

- Location within Missouri Location within the United States
- Location: Roughly bounded by St. Joseph Ave., Myrtle St., Clark St., and Magnolia Ave., St. Joseph, Missouri
- Coordinates: 39°47′30″N 94°50′47″W
- Area: 21.5 acres (8.7 ha)
- Architect: Felt, John H.; Eckel, E.J., Aldrich, William S.
- Architectural style: Greek Revival, Italianate, et al.
- MPS: St. Joseph MPS (AD)
- NRHP reference No.: 02000817
- Added to NRHP: August 1, 2002

Krug Park Place Historic District is a national historic district located at St. Joseph, Missouri. The district encompasses 28 contributing buildings and 1 contributing site in a predominantly residential section of St. Joseph. It developed between about 1888 and 1938, and includes representative examples of Italianate, Queen Anne, Colonial Revival, Tudor Revival, and American Craftsman style architecture. Notable buildings include the Henry Krug, Jr. House (1892) designed by architect Edmond Jacques Eckel (1845–1934),`A.V. Schaeffer House (1913), W.W. Van Sant House (1914), J.G. Schneider House (1899) by Eckel, Benton Quick House (1901), Mrs. W.B. Watkins House (1903), and George Ward House (c. 1857).

It was listed on the National Register of Historic Places in 2002.
