= Dr. Jacob Geiger House-Maud Wyeth Painter House =

Historic house in Missouri, United States

- U.S. National Register of Historic Places
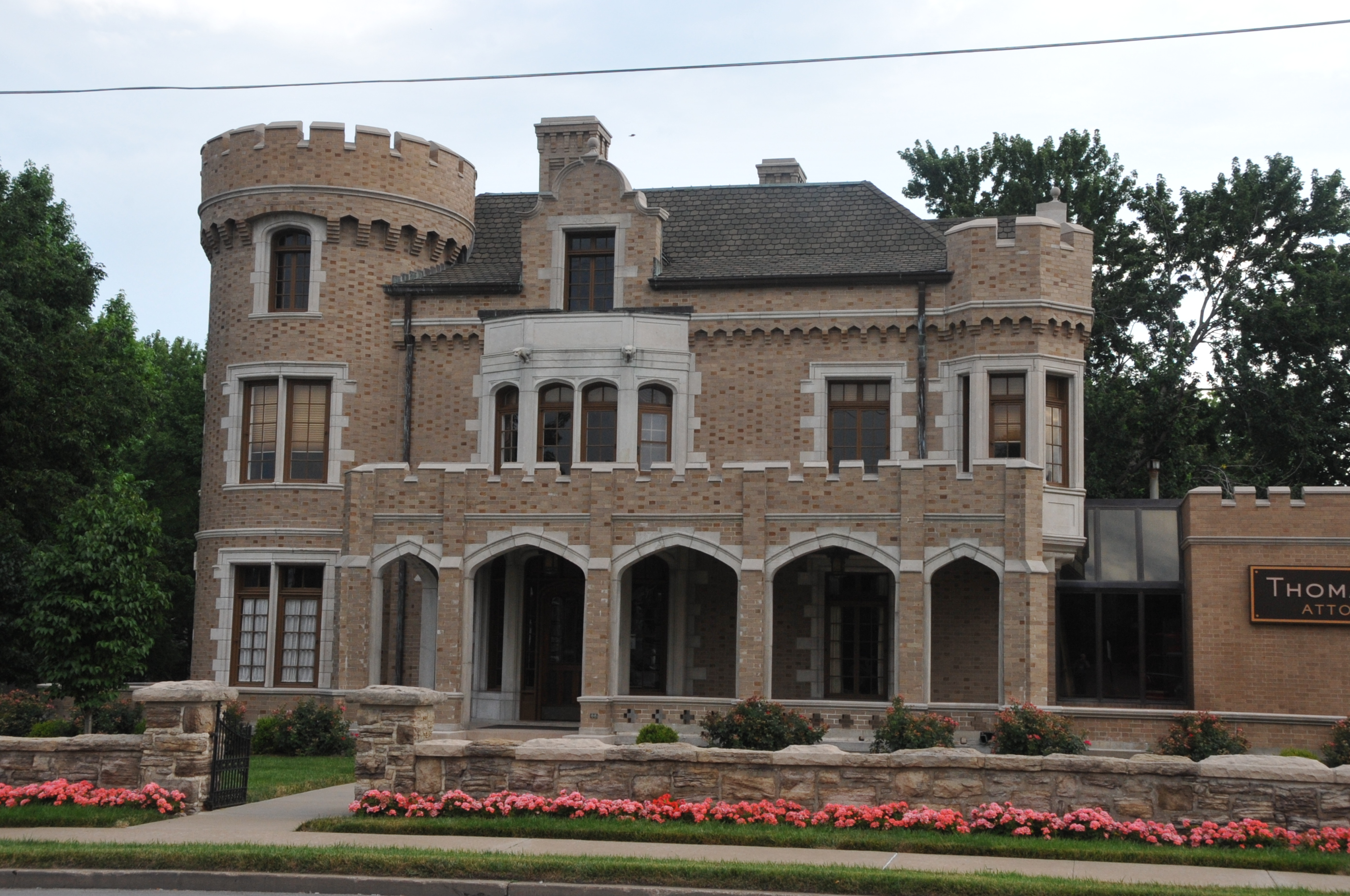
- Dr. Jacob Geiger House-Maud Wyeth Painter House, July 2013

- Location within Missouri Location within the United States
- Location: 2501 Frederick Ave., St. Joseph, Missouri
- Coordinates: 39°46′37″N 94°49′48″W
- Area: less than one acre
- Built: 1911-1912
- Architect: Eckel & Aldrich et al.
- Architectural style: English Gothic Revival
- MPS: Frederick Avenue MRA
- NRHP reference No.: 86000826
- Added to NRHP: March 12, 1986

Dr. Jacob Geiger House-Maud Wyeth Painter House, also known as the United Missouri Bank, is a historic home located at St. Joseph, Missouri. It was designed by the architecture firm of Eckel & Aldrich and built in 1911–1912. It is a 2 1/2-story, Gothic Revival style masonry building with a three-story crenellated tower and a two-story crenellated tower. It features an arcaded porch and a four-bay bow window with gargoyles. The house has been converted for commercial uses.

It was listed on the National Register of Historic Places in 1986.
