= Wholesale Row =

- U.S. National Register of Historic Places
- U.S. Historic district
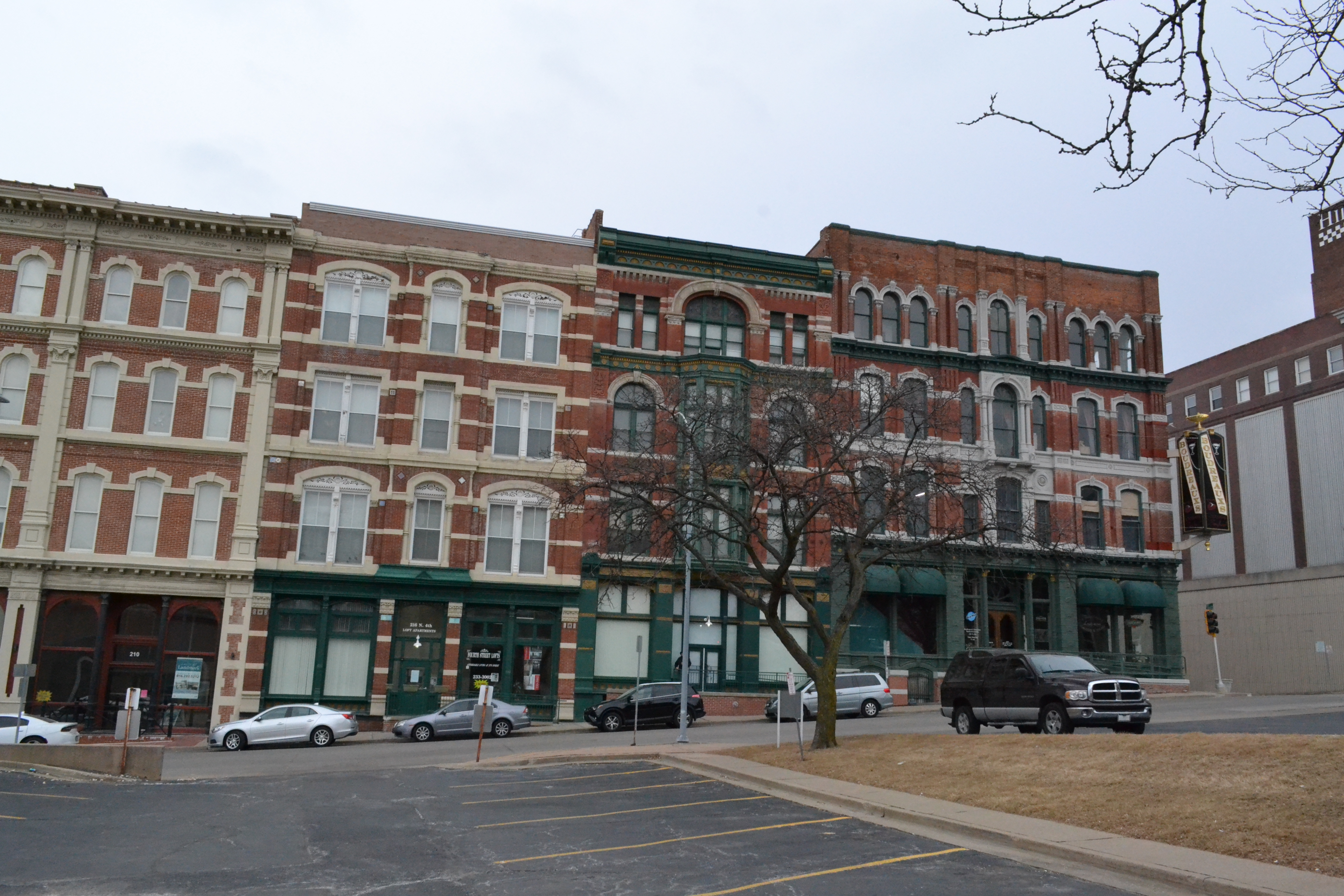
- Northern half of Wholesale Row

- Location within Missouri Location within the United States
- Location: Bounded by Jules, 3rd, 4th, and Francis Sts., St. Joseph, Missouri
- Coordinates: 39°46′4″N 94°51′23″W
- Area: 1.7 acres (0.69 ha)
- Built: 1872
- Architect: Edmond Jacques Eckel
- Architectural style: Italianate
- NRHP reference No.: 77000800
- Added to NRHP: September 19, 1977

Wholesale Row, also known as the Wholesale Row Historic District, is a national historic district located at St. Joseph, Missouri. The district originally encompassed five contributing buildings in an industrial / commercial section of St. Joseph on the western edge of the central business district. The Noyes-Norman Building (1872) on 3rd Street has been demolished. It developed between about 1872 and 1884, and includes representative examples of Italianate style architecture. The remaining buildings are the R.L. McDonald and Co. Building (1880), Englehart-Winning Co. North Building (1884), Englehart-Winning Co. South Building (1880), and Brittain-Richardson and Co. Building (1882). The remaining buildings were all designed by the architect Edmond Jacques Eckel (1845–1934).

It was listed on the National Register of Historic Places in 1977.

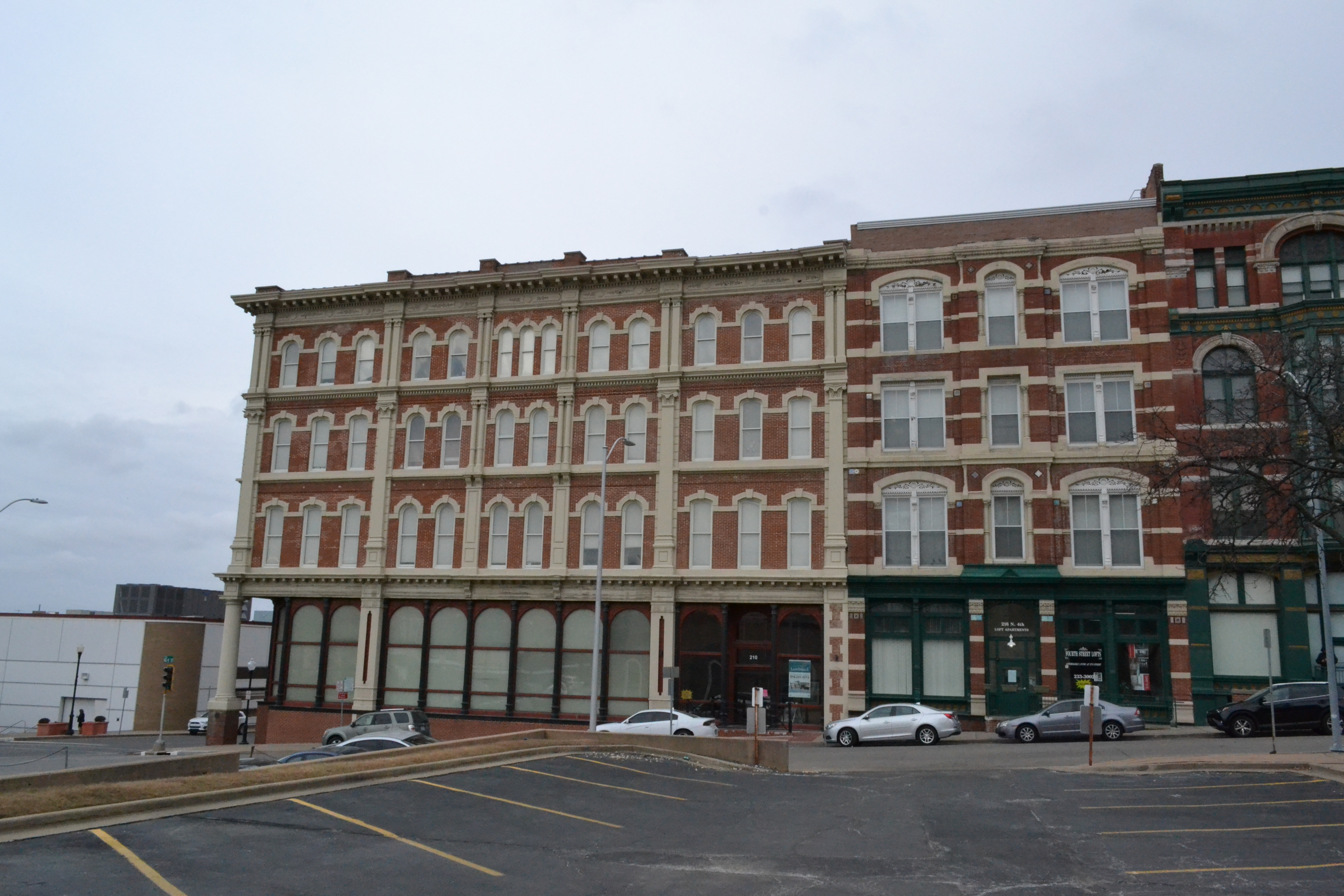
