= Central Police Station (St. Joseph, Missouri) =

- U.S. National Register of Historic Places
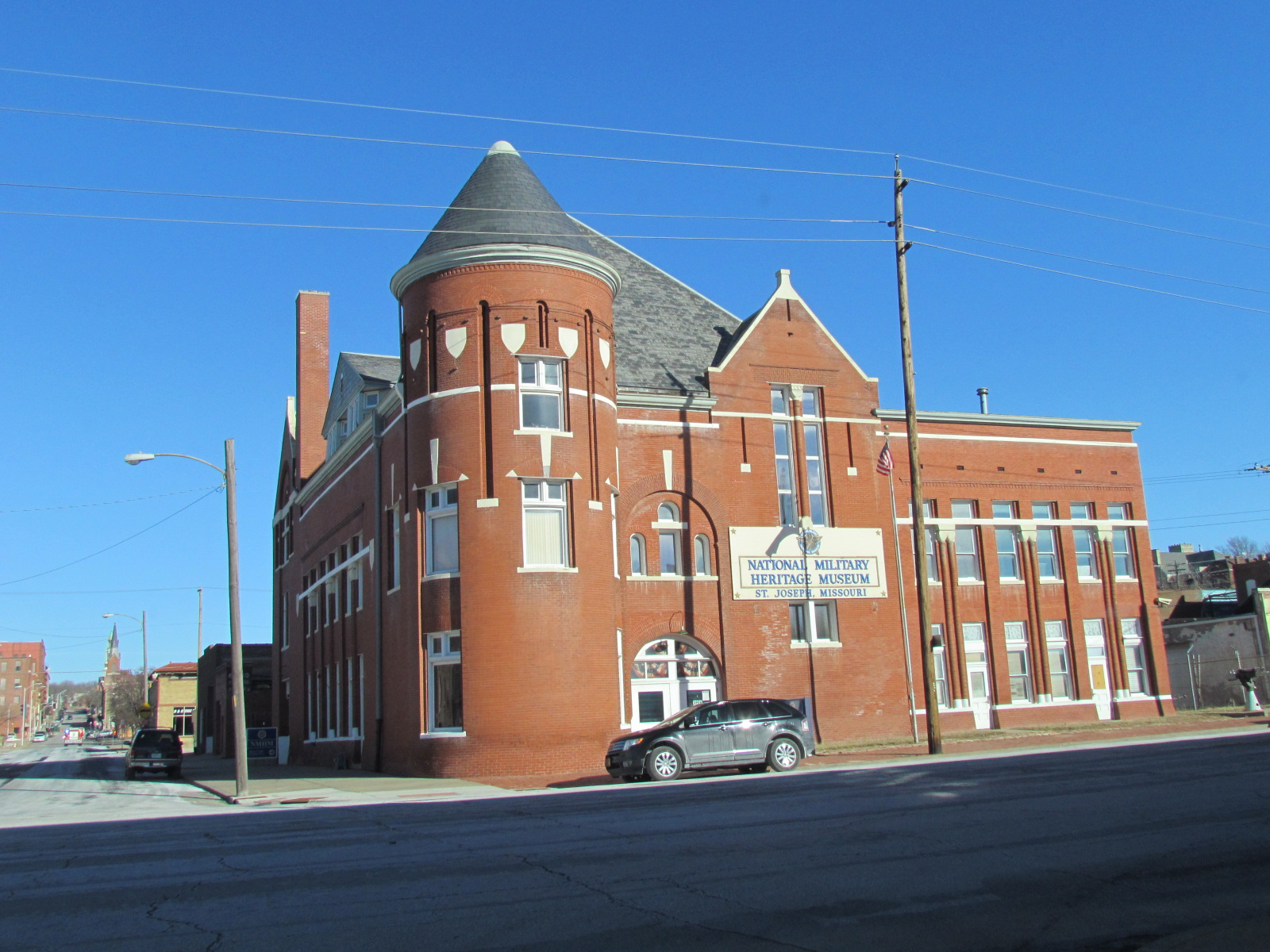

- Location within Missouri Location within the United States
- Location: 701 Messanie, St. Joseph, Missouri
- Coordinates: 39°45′45.8″N 94°51′05.8″W
- Area: less than one acre
- Built: 1891; 1909
- Architect: Eckel & Mann (1891)
- Architectural style: Romanesque
- NRHP reference No.: 09000887
- Added to NRHP: November 5, 2009

The Central Police Station, also known as the National Military Heritage Museum, is a historic police station located at 701 Messanie in St. Joseph, Missouri. It was designed by Eckel & Mann and built in 1891 with an addition in 1909. It is a three-story, "L"-plan brick building in the Richardsonian Romanesque style. It has a hipped roof, limestone ornamentation and details, and a round corner tower.

It was listed on the National Register of Historic Places in 2009.
