= Livestock Exchange Building (St. Joseph, Missouri) =

- Formerly listed on the U.S. National Register of Historic Places
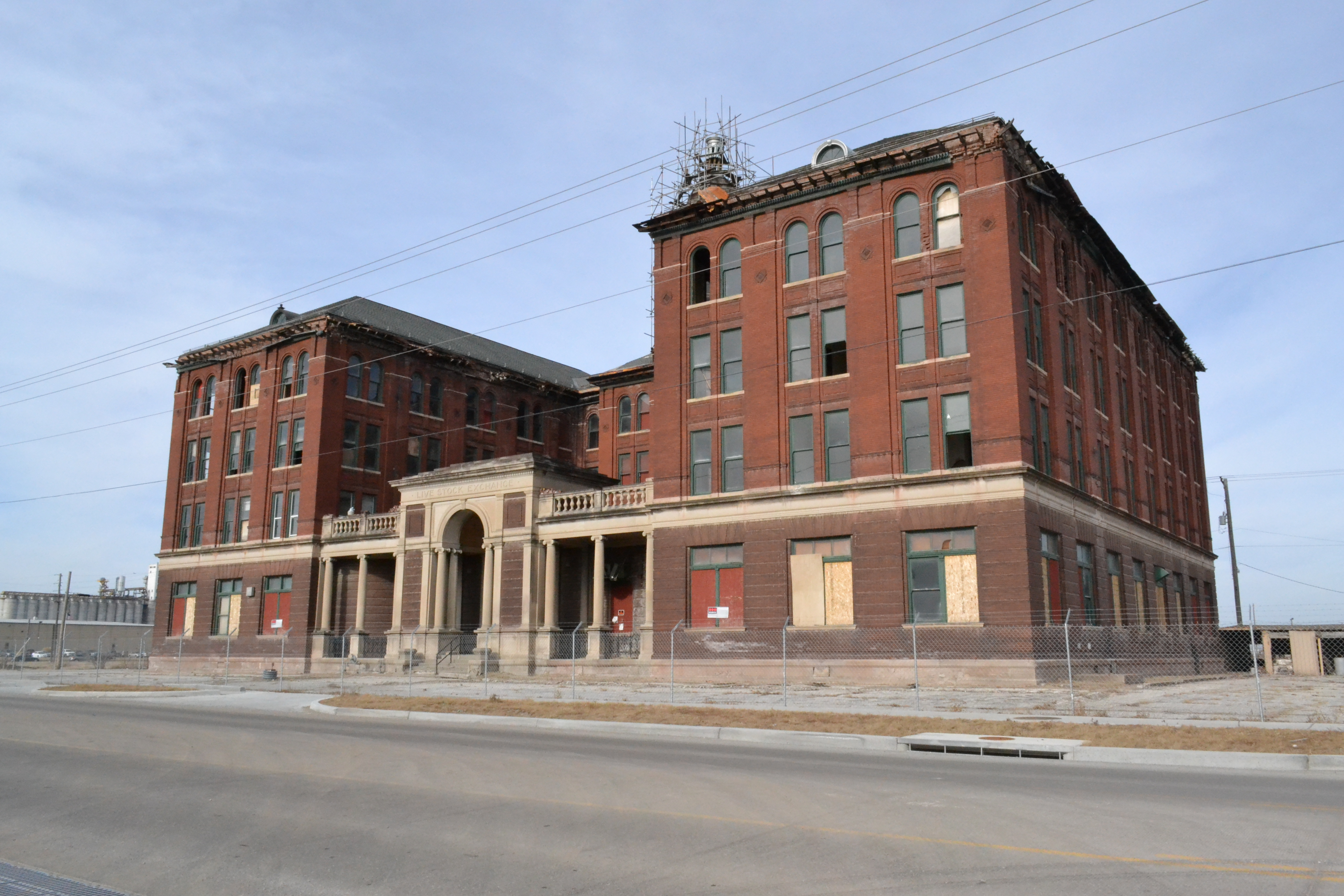

- Location within Missouri Location within the United States
- Location: 601 Illinois Ave., St. Joseph, Missouri
- Coordinates: 39°43′14″N 94°52′10″W
- Area: 6.2 acres (2.5 ha)
- Built: 1898-1899
- Built by: Buddy, Phillip P.
- Architect: Eckel, Edmond J.
- Architectural style: Classical Revival
- NRHP reference No.: 04000342

Significant dates
- Added to NRHP: April 20, 2004
- Removed from NRHP: January 7, 2025

Livestock Exchange Building (now demolished) was a historic commercial building located at St. Joseph, Missouri. It was designed by architect Edmond Jacques Eckel (1845–1934) and built in 1898–1899. It is a four-story, red brick and stone building with Neoclassical style ornamentation. Also on the property are two contributing multi-car garages and a loading platform. The building was once considered the crown jewel in the vast stockyards and packinghouses on the south side of St. Joseph.

It was listed on the National Register of Historic Places in 2004, and was delisted in 2025.
