= Nodaway County Courthouse =

- U.S. National Register of Historic Places
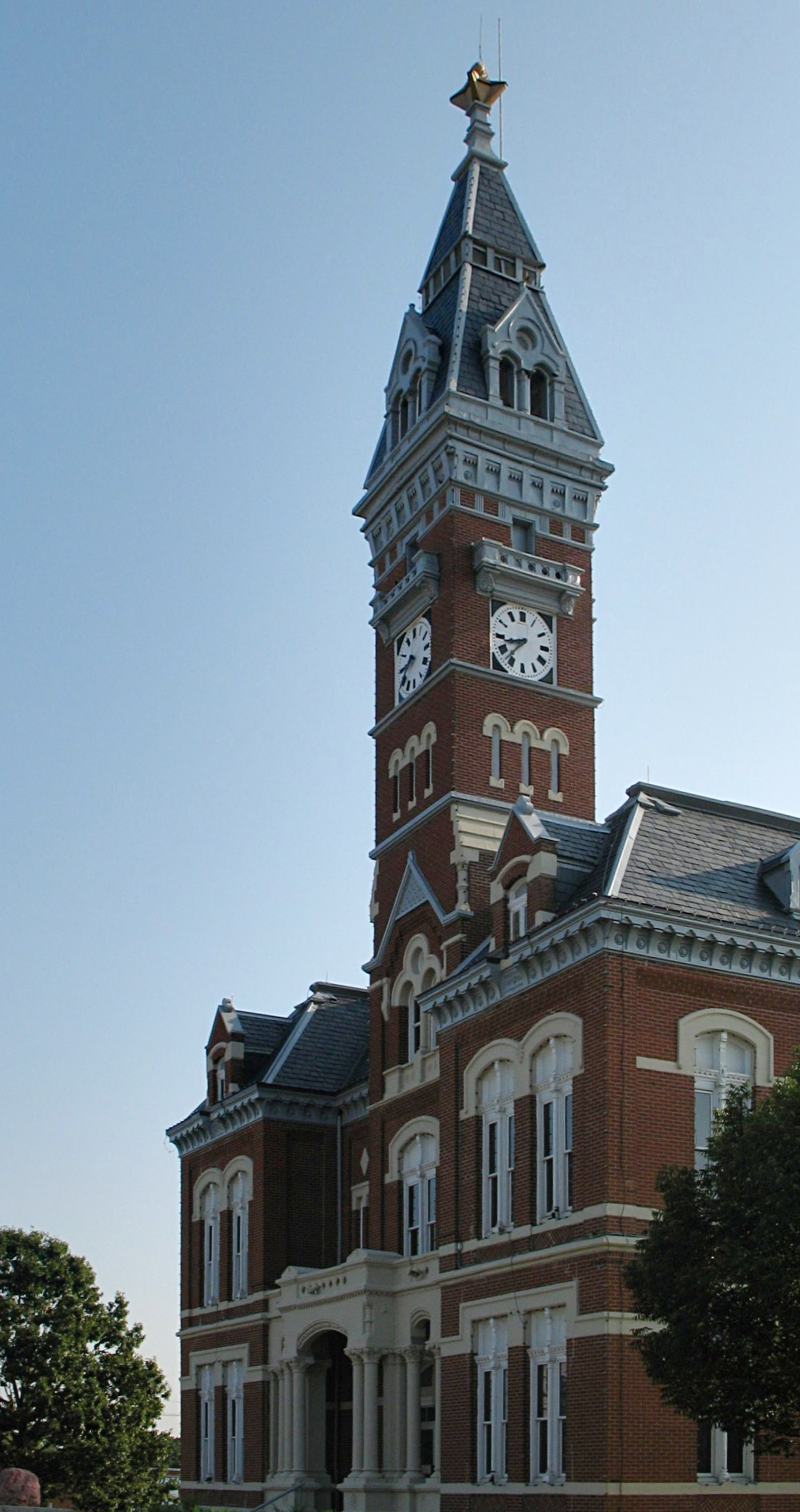

- Location within Missouri Location within the United States
- Interactive map showing the location of Nodaway County Courthouse
- Location: 3rd and Main Sts., Maryville, Missouri
- Coordinates: 40.3482666°N 94.8721861°W
- Area: 1.6 acres (0.65 ha)
- Built: 1881
- Built by: Allen, R.K.
- Architect: Eckel & Mann
- Architectural style: Italianate
- NRHP reference No.: 79001386
- Added to NRHP: October 11, 1979

Nodaway County Courthouse, is a historic courthouse located at Maryville, Nodaway County, Missouri. It was designed by the architectural firm Eckel & Mann. Construction began in 1882, but it was not completed and ready for occupancy until the spring of 1883. It is a two-story, High Victorian Italianate style rectangular brick building. It measures approximately 111 feet, 6 inches, long and 76 feet wide. It has a truncated hipped roof with massive cornice. It features a tower, recessed portico, and ornamental stonework.

It was listed on the National Register of Historic Places in 1979.
