= Kemper Addition Historic District =

Historic district in Missouri, U.S.

- U.S. National Register of Historic Places
- U.S. Historic district
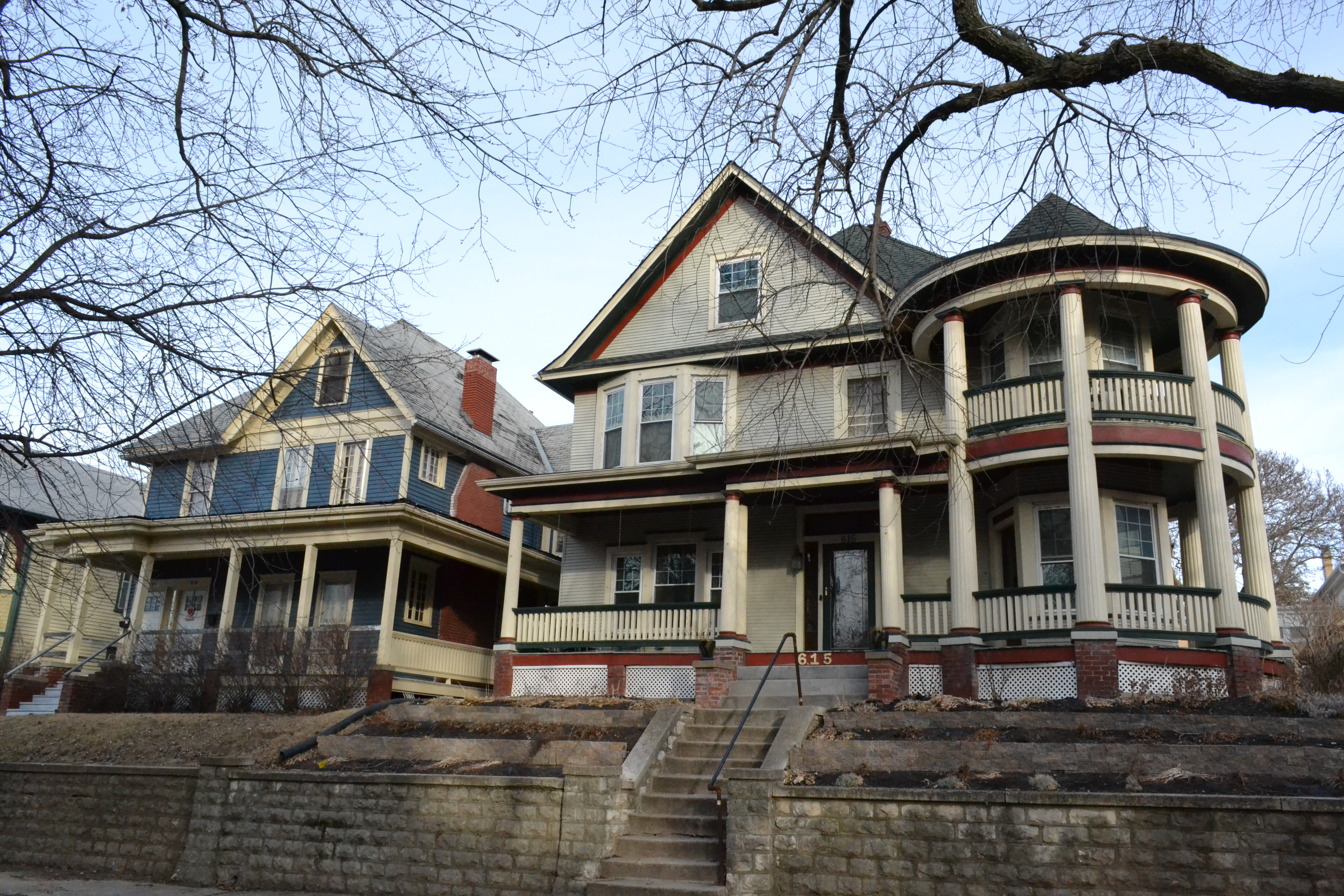
- Hutchings House (left) and Spencer House (right)

- Location within Missouri Location within the United States
- Location: Portions of Clay, Union, Kemper and Bon Ton Sts., St. Joseph, Missouri
- Coordinates: 39°46′19″N 94°50′11″W
- Area: 17.5 acres (7.1 ha)
- Architect: Heim, Rudolph F.; Eckel, E.J., et al.
- Architectural style: Colonial Revival, Bungalow/craftsman, et al.
- MPS: St. Joseph MPS
- NRHP reference No.: 01000721
- Added to NRHP: September 20, 2002

Kemper Addition Historic District is a national historic district located at St. Joseph, Missouri. The district encompasses 74 contributing buildings and 1 contributing site in a predominantly residential section of St. Joseph. It developed between about 1880 and 1950, and includes representative examples of Colonial Revival, Tudor Revival, and American Craftsman style architecture. Notable buildings include the Jacob Spencer House (1912), H. E. Hutchings House (1887), Fred Binz House (c. 1895), Thomas Moseley Duplex (1894), Plaza Apartments (1928–1929), Hickey-Fargrave House (1899, 1915) with alterations by architect Edmond Jacques Eckel (1845–1934),`C. E. Sprague House (1905) by Eckel, David Bartlett House (1900) by Eckel, and Samuel Nave House (1889).

It was listed on the National Register of Historic Places in 2002.
