= St. Joseph City Hall =

- U.S. National Register of Historic Places
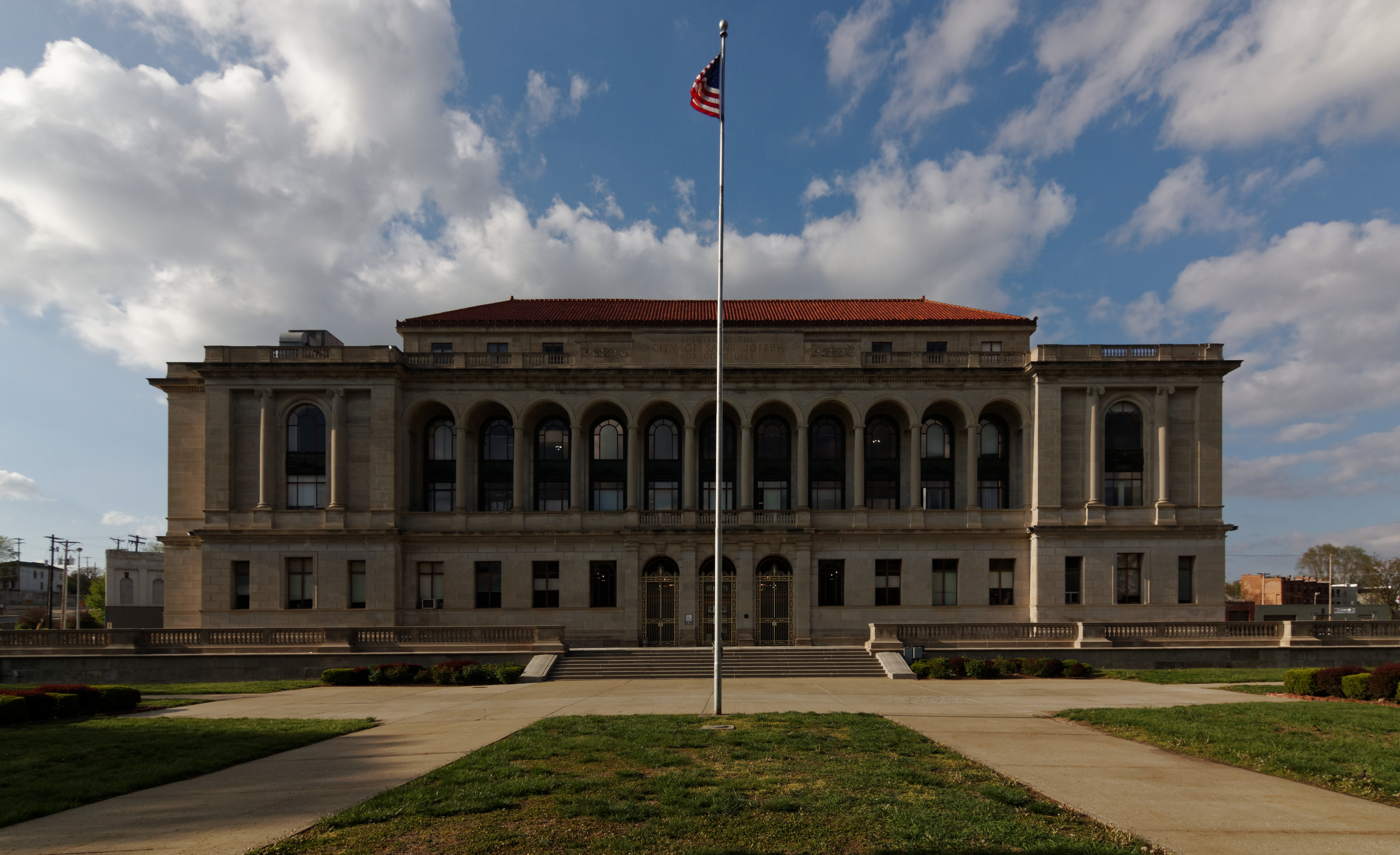
- St. Joseph City Hall, April 2016

- Location within Missouri Location within the United States
- Location: Frederick Ave. at Eleventh St., St. Joseph, Missouri
- Coordinates: 39°46′7″N 94°50′47″W
- Area: 1 acre (0.40 ha)
- Built: 1926-1927
- Architect: Eckel & Aldrich et al.
- Architectural style: Late 19th And 20th Century Revivals, Italian Renaissance Revival
- MPS: Frederick Avenue MRA
- NRHP reference No.: 85003356
- Added to NRHP: October 25, 1985

St. Joseph City Hall is a historic city hall located at St. Joseph, Missouri. It was designed by the architectural firm Eckel & Aldrich and built in 1926–1927. It is a three-story, stone and concrete building in the Italian Renaissance Revival style. It features a concrete balustraded loggia on the second level, engaged columns, arched openings, and a red tile hipped roof.

It was listed on the National Register of Historic Places in 1985.
