= German-American Bank Building (St. Joseph, Missouri) =

- U.S. National Register of Historic Places
- U.S. Historic district – Contributing property
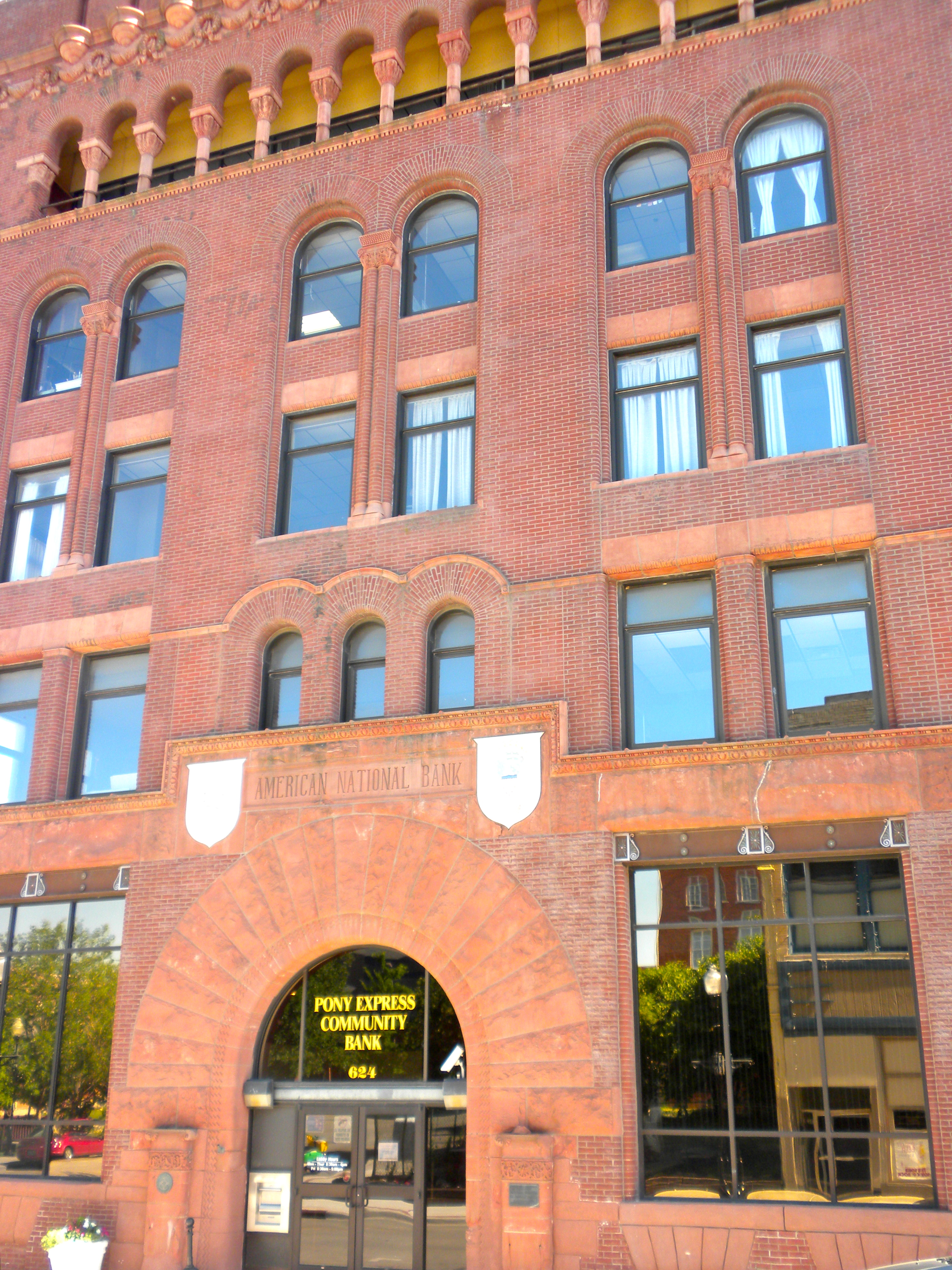

- Location within Missouri Location within the United States
- Location: 624 Felix St., St. Joseph, Missouri
- Coordinates: 39°45′59″N 94°51′7″W
- Area: 0.3 acres (0.12 ha)
- Built: 1889
- Architects: Eckel & Mann; Harvey Ellis
- Architectural style: Romanesque, Richardsonian Romanesque
- NRHP reference No.: 78001638
- Added to NRHP: November 24, 1978

The German-American Bank Building is a historic bank building located at St. Joseph, Missouri. It was built in 1889, and is a six-story, rectangular brick building designed in the Richardsonian Romanesque style with added Beaux-Arts detailing.. The bank originally was created to provide service to the large number of German-speaking citizens in the region. In 1918 it was renamed the American National Bank. Later, it became First Federal Savings and Loan.

It was placed on the National Register of Historic Places in 1978. It is located in the St. Joseph's Commerce and Banking Historic District.

In 1986 a number of aspects were photographed and documented by the Historic American Buildings Survey.

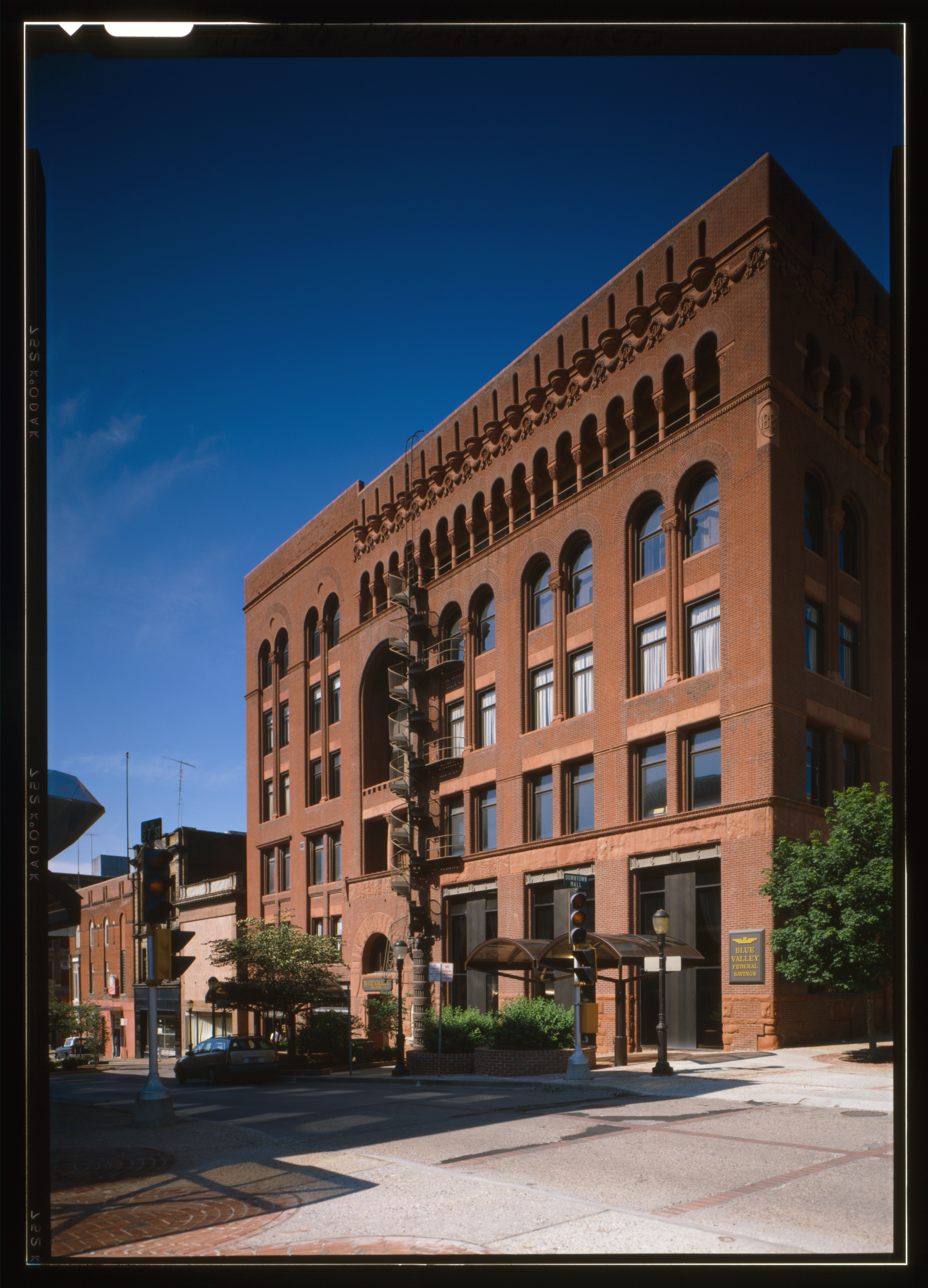
From 1986 Historic American Buildings Survey.

It was announced in July, 2014, that Heartland Health and Mosaic Life Care would be renovating the building along with surrounding properties in a 2-year, $20 million effort. As part of a revitalization project in downtown St. Joseph, it will provide office space for up to 200 health workers. At the time of the announcement, it is being used by Legal Aid of Western Missouri and several other businesses. The renovation is intended to blend historic bank features such as the natural brick walls and the carved columns with the company's standard design look and modern features.
