= Miller-Porter-Lacy House =

Historic house in Missouri, United States

- U.S. National Register of Historic Places
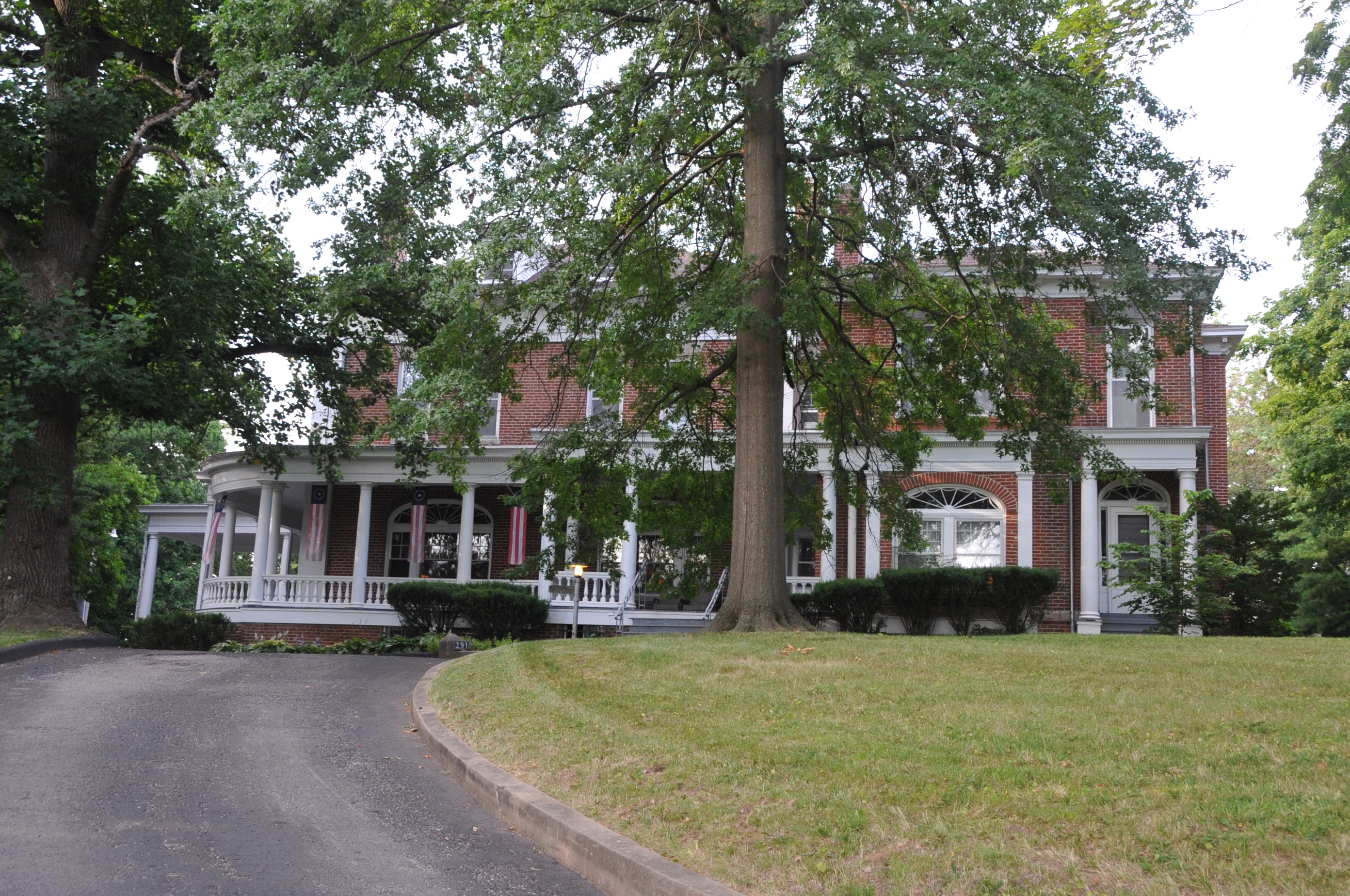
- Miller-Porter-Lacy House, July 2013

- Location within Missouri Location within the United States
- Location: 2912 Frederick Blvd., St. Joseph, Missouri
- Coordinates: 39°46′34″N 94°49′14″W
- Area: 5 acres (2.0 ha)
- Built: 1883, 1902
- Architect: Eckel, Edmund Jacques
- Architectural style: Colonial Revival, Italianate, Georgian Revival
- NRHP reference No.: 82003127
- Added to NRHP: September 9, 1982

Miller-Porter-Lacy House, also known as the Lacy House, is a historic home located at St. Joseph, Missouri. The original section was built in 1883, as an Italianate style brick farmhouse. It was enlarged and remodeled in 1902 by the architect Edmond Jacques Eckel (1845–1934) in the Colonial Revival / Georgian Revival style. It is a large brick dwelling with a low hipped roof. It features Tuscan order columned porches and a porte cochere. Also on the property is a contributing carriage house and croquet and tennis court sites.

It was listed on the National Register of Historic Places in 1982.
