= Hall Street Historic District =

Historic district in Missouri, United States

- U.S. National Register of Historic Places
- U.S. Historic district
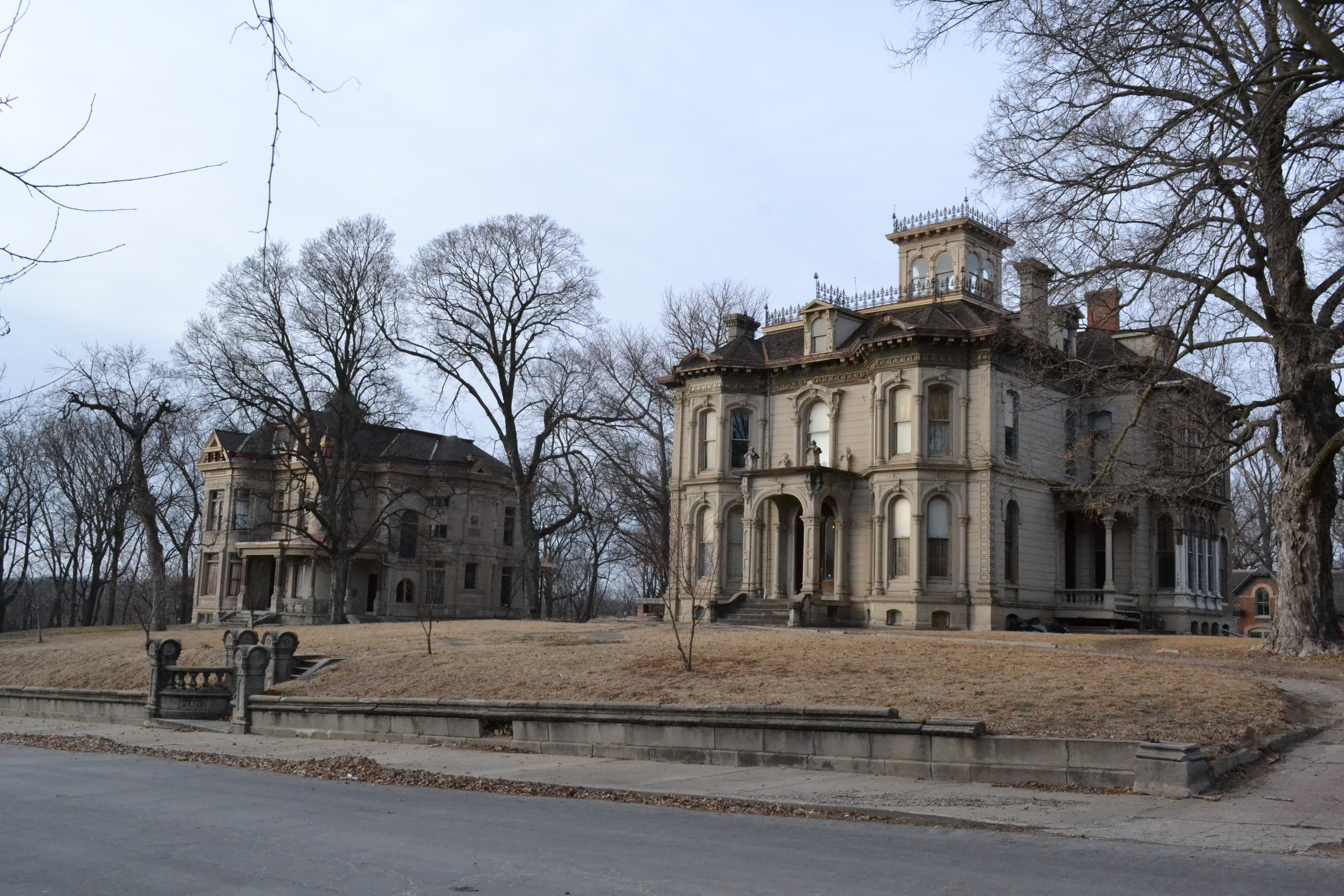

- Location within Missouri Location within the United States
- Location: Roughly bounded by Isadore, Corby, 6th and 9th Sts., St. Joseph, Missouri
- Coordinates: 39°46′20″N 94°51′04″W
- Area: 19.4 acres (7.9 ha)
- Built: 1870
- Architect: Multiple
- Architectural style: Late 19th And 20th Century Revivals, Late Victorian, Italianate
- NRHP reference No.: 79001352
- Added to NRHP: July 17, 1979

Hall Street Historic District is a national historic district located at St. Joseph, Missouri. The district encompasses 43 contributing buildings in a predominantly residential section of St. Joseph. It developed between about 1870 and 1920, and includes representative examples of Italianate and Late Victorian style architecture. Notable buildings include the Karl Schatz House (c. 1880), Rolanda Court Apartments (c. 1910), Chase-McClain House (1870s), John Forest Martie House (c. 1870), Oak Ridge Apartments (1890), James H. Robinson - William W. Wheeler House (1883), Cummings Ogden House (1885), Bill Osgood House (1890), and Missouri Methodist Hospital - Huggins House (1908).

It was listed on the National Register of Historic Places in 1979.
