= St. Joseph Public Library =

Library building in St. Joseph, Missouri, US

- U.S. National Register of Historic Places
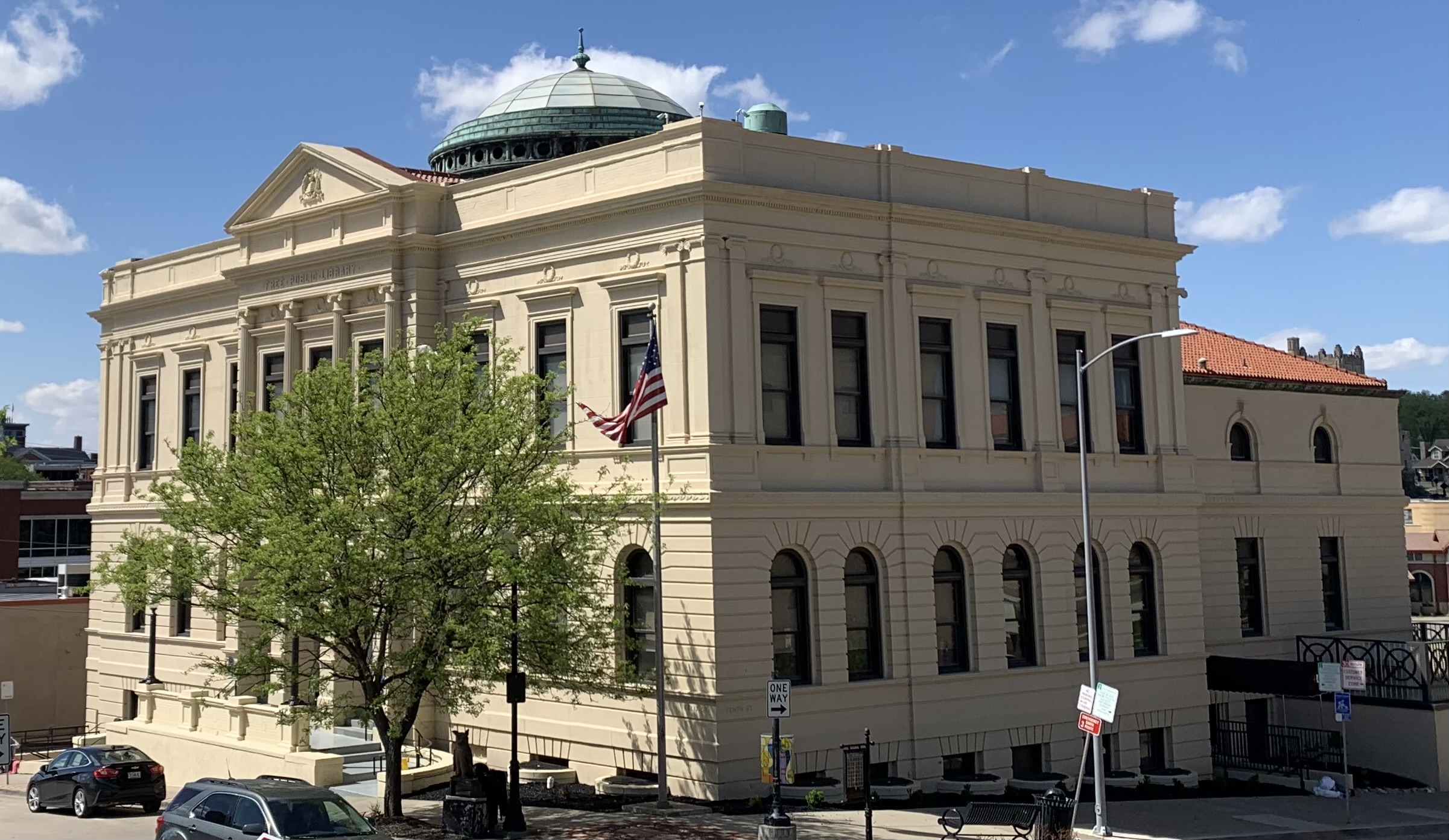
- St. Joseph Public Library in 2026

- Location within Missouri Location within the United States
- Location: 10th and Felix Sts., St. Joseph, Missouri
- Coordinates: 39°46′0″N 94°50′53″W
- Area: less than one acre
- Built: 1901-1902
- Architect: Eckel, Edmond Jacques
- Architectural style: French Baroque Classicism
- NRHP reference No.: 82003129
- Added to NRHP: September 20, 1982

St. Joseph Public Library, also known as Free Public Library, Public Museum, Public Library, and Board of Education Building, is a historic library building located at St. Joseph, Missouri. This library has over 9,000 books. It was designed by the architect Edmond Jacques Eckel (1845–1934) and built in 1901–1902 in the French Baroque style. It is a two-story, brick and reinforced concrete building sheathed in beige marble and limestone. It has a red hipped roof topped by a skeletal glazed dome. It features a pedimented projecting central bay and entrance loggia.

It was listed on the National Register of Historic Places in 1982.
