= DeKalb County Courthouse (Missouri) =

Local government building in the United States

- U.S. National Register of Historic Places
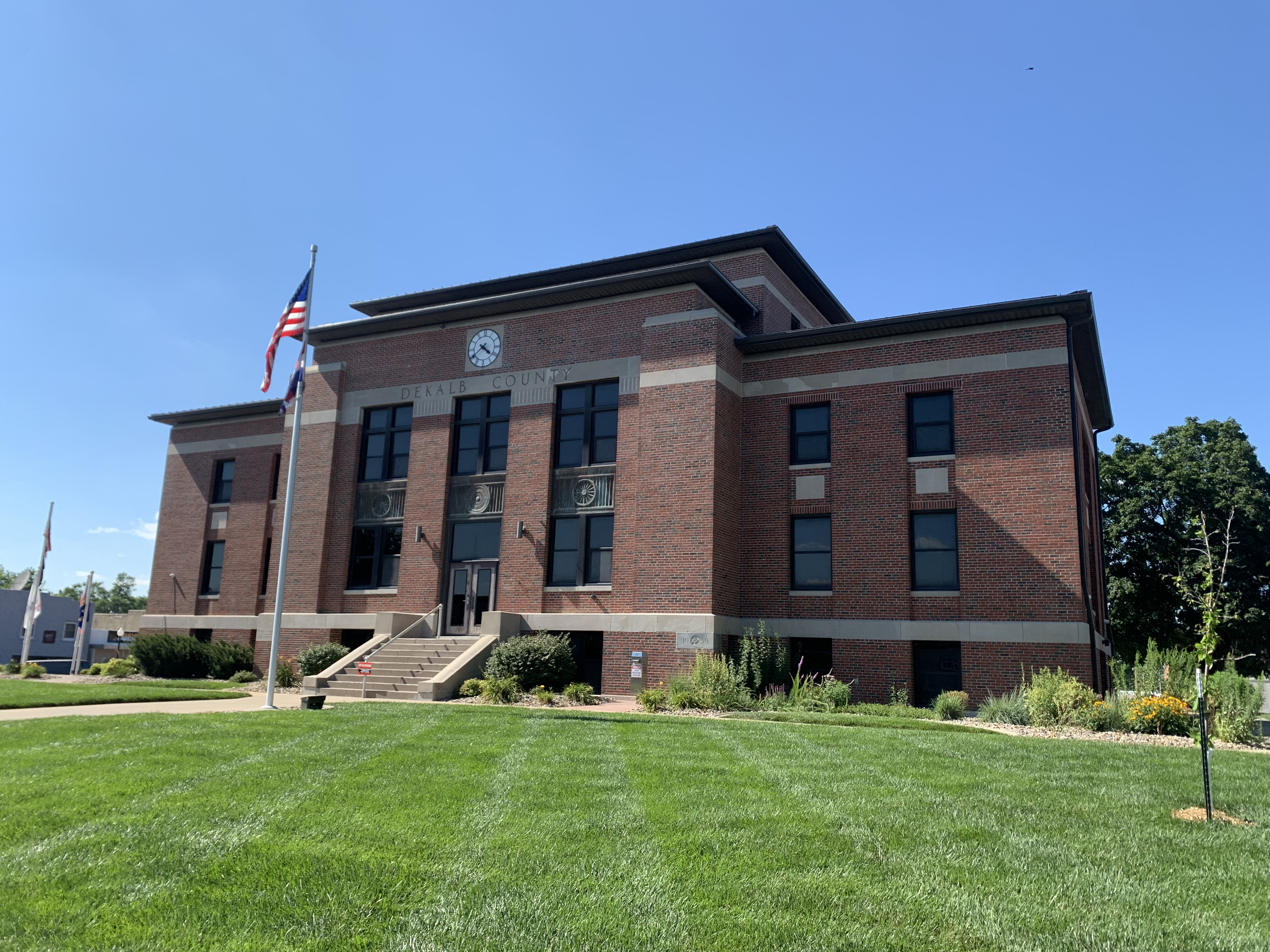

- Location within Missouri Location within the United States
- Location: 109 W. Main Street, Maysville, Missouri
- Coordinates: 39°53′24″N 94°21′35″W
- Area: 1.3 acres (0.53 ha)
- Built by: J. E. Hathman
- Architect: Eckel & Aldrich
- Architectural style: Moderne
- NRHP reference No.: 98000068
- Added to NRHP: February 5, 1998

DeKalb County Courthouse is a historic courthouse located in Maysville, DeKalb County, Missouri. It was designed by George R. Eckel of Eckel & Aldrich and built in 1939. It is a low red brick building with concrete bands and Moderne style details. It consists of a three-story main block with two-story flanking wings. The building measures 110 feet by 55 feet.

It was listed on the National Register of Historic Places in 1998.
