= Pony Express (disambiguation) =

The Pony Express was a U.S. mail service that operated from April 1860 to October 1861.

Pony Express may also refer to:

== Film and television ==
- The Pony Express (1907 film), an American silent short film
- The Pony Express (1925 film), an American silent film by James Cruze
- The Pony Express (1932 film), a Flip the Frog cartoon
- Pony Express (film), a 1953 American film
- Pony Express (TV series), a 1959–60 television series

== Sports ==
- Denver Broncos Cheerleaders, known as the Pony Express from 1977 to 1985
- SMU Mustangs football team, nicknamed The Pony Express in the 1980s

== Other uses ==
- Pony express (newspapers), a dispatch service employed by newspapers prior to adoption of the telegraph
- Pony Express (roller coaster), a roller coaster at Knott's Berry Farm amusement park
- Operation Pony Express, a military operation during the Vietnam War
- Pony Express Bridge, a bridge over the Missouri River on US-36
- Pony Express Council, a scouting organization in Missouri
- Pony Express Historical Association, the not-for-profit organization that owns the historical Patee House (the headquarters of the Pony Express)
- Pony Express Museum, a transport museum in Saint Joseph, Missouri
- Pony Express Region, a region of northwestern Missouri
- Pony Express Stables, the eastern terminus of the Pony Express, now the home of the museum
- Pony Express Terminal, the western endpoint of the Pony Express
- Pony Express, the fictional cargo company the characters work for in Mouthwashing (video game)

== See also ==
- Pony Express Record, a 1994 album by Shudder to Think
