= Robert Haslam (Pony Express) =

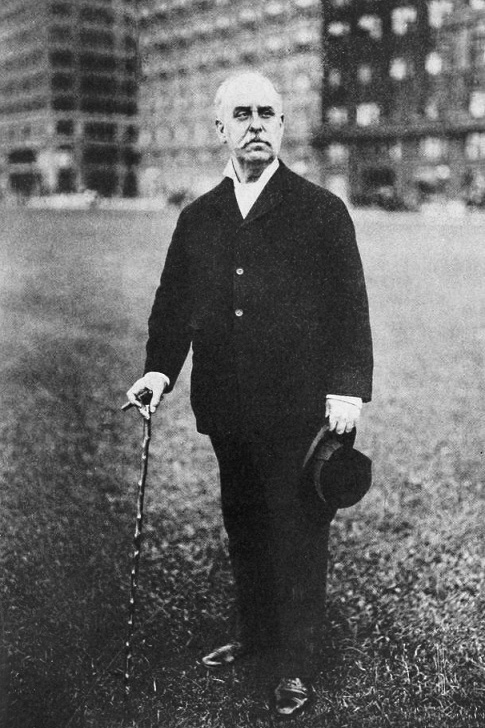
Robert Haslam aka Pony Bob circa 1908

Robert "Pony Bob" Haslam (January 1840, London, England – February 29, 1912, Chicago, Illinois) was a Pony Express rider in the American Old West. He came to the United States as a teenager and was hired by Bolivar Roberts, helped build the stations, and was assigned the run from Friday's Station (State Line) to Buckland Station near Fort Churchill, 75 miles to the east. Perhaps his greatest ride, 120 miles in 8 hours and 20 minutes while wounded, was an important contribution to the fastest trip ever made by the Pony Express. The message carried was Abraham Lincoln's Inaugural Address. After the Pony Express, Haslam returned as an employee of Wells, Fargo & Company, which operated its own enterprise between San Francisco and Virginia City. He later served as a Deputy United States Marshall in Salt Lake City. In his final years he worked as a greeter in the Congress Plaza Hotel in Chicago. He made a personal business card with a sketch of himself as a Pony Express rider at the age of twenty and entertained guests with stories of his adventures.

Haslam is credited with having made the longest round trip ride of the Pony Express. He had received the eastbound mail (probably the May 10 mail from San Francisco) at Friday's Station. At Buckland's Station, a few days after Pony Express rider Bart Riles had been killed, his relief rider was so badly frightened over the Indian threat that he refused to take the mail. Haslam agreed to take the mail all the way to Smith's Creek for a total distance of 190 miles without a rest. After a rest of nine hours, he retraced his route with the westbound mail. At Cold Springs he found that Indians had raided the place, killing the station keeper and running off all of the stock. Finally he reached Buckland's Station, completing a 380-mile round trip, the longest on record for the Pony Express.

Haslam continued to work as a rider for Wells Fargo and Company after the U.S. Civil War, scouted for the U.S. Army well into his fifties, and later accompanied his good friend Buffalo Bill Cody on a diplomatic mission to negotiate the surrender of Chief Sitting Bull in December 1890. He drifted in and out of public mention but eventually died in Chicago during the winter of 1912 (age 72) in deep poverty after suffering a stroke. It is reported that Buffalo Bill paid for Pony Bob's headstone at Mount Greenwood Cemetery on Chicago's far south side; however, the business records indicate it was paid for by a family member. A map to the grave site is available from the cemetery office during regular business hours (all week, 9:00 AM - 4:00 PM).
