= Robert Haslam =

Robert Haslam may refer to:

- Robert Haslam (industrialist) (1923–2002), British industrialist
- Robert Haslam (Pony Express) (1840–1912), Pony Express rider in the American Old West
