= Jesse James Home Museum =

Historic house in Missouri, United States

- Jesse James House
- U.S. National Register of Historic Places
- U.S. Historic district – Contributing property
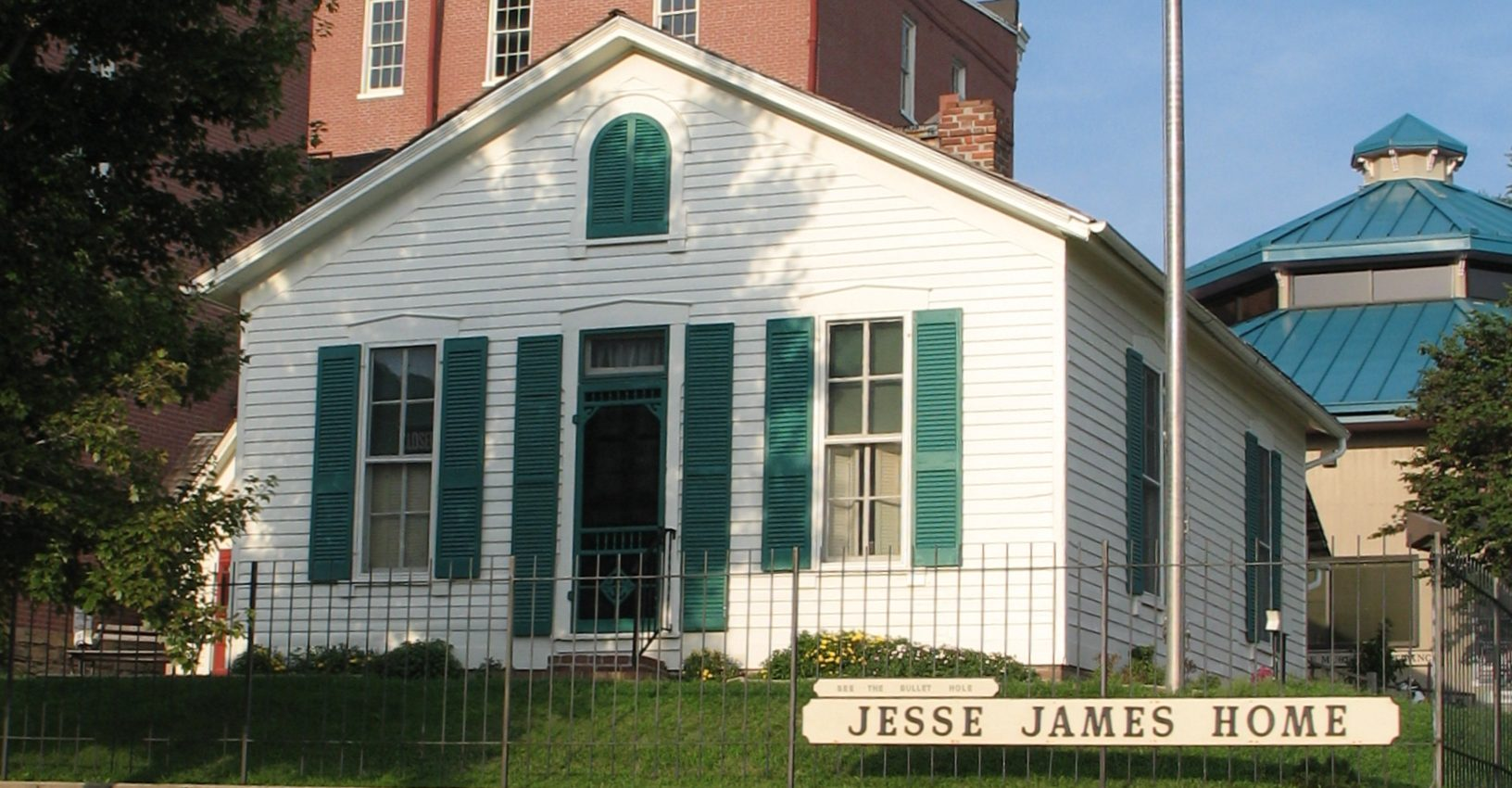
- Jesse James Home, St. Joseph, Missouri

- Location within Missouri
- Location: 12th St. and Mitchell Ave., St. Joseph, MO
- Coordinates: 39°45′19.79″N 94°50′42.5″W
- Area: less than one acre
- Built: 1880
- Architectural style: Greek Revival
- NRHP reference No.: 80002319
- Added to NRHP: September 4, 1980

The Jesse James Home Museum is the house in St. Joseph, Missouri where outlaw Jesse James was living and was gunned down on April 3, 1882, by Robert Ford. It is a one-story, Greek Revival style frame dwelling measuring 24 feet, 2 inches, wide and 30 feet, 4 inches, deep.

At the time, the house was located at 1318 Lafayette Street in St. Joseph. In 1939, it was moved to a busier Belt Highway location. In 1977, it was moved to a location directly behind Patee House at 12th and Mitchell in St. Joseph, only two blocks away from its original location, which restored more of its historic context.

The investigation into the shooting death of James was conducted at Patee House Hotel (formerly the World's Hotel). Mrs. James, her two children, and Jesse's mother stayed in Patee House for two nights after Jesse James was killed.

The house contains a large bullet hole on the north interior wall. Originally much smaller, the hole was gradually enlarged by souvenir hunters who carved away fragments as keepsakes. The opening is not associated with the shot that killed James; a 1995 autopsy determined that the fatal bullet entered behind his right ear and did not exit the skull.

The Jesse James Home contains a number of items owned by Jesse James and his family. In 1995, top forensic scientist Professor James E. Starrs, of George Washington University, conducted an exhumation of the grave of Jesse James to settle persistent controversy about the remains. In February 1996, he announced that DNA tests performed on the remains and compared to the DNA of existing known relatives proved a 99.7% reliability that the body in the grave was that of Jesse James. The museum includes new exhibits based on the 1995 exhumation, including artifacts such as coffin handles, bits of wood, and a pin Jesse James wore in his death photo, as well as numerous photos taken during the exhumation.

The home was listed on the National Register of Historic Places on September 4, 1980. It is a contributing resource to the Patee Town Historic District.
