= Legends of the Pony Express =

- Genre: History; Documentaries
- Inspired by: Pony Express
- Written by: René Brar
- Directed by: René Brar; Matthew Shewchuk
- Country of origin: United States
- Original language: English

Production
- Running time: 43 minutes

Original release
- Network: INSP
- Release: March 10, 2024

Legends of the Pony Express is a 2024 TV special documentary, which aired on the INSP network. It tells the story of how the Pony Express came into existence and operated.

== Background ==
Despite only running for less than two years, the Pony Express became steeped in western history and tales from the American frontier. Journeys by horse were made carrying postal mail between Sacramento and St Joseph, close to Kansas City, with numerous stops between.

The TV special studies and pay tribute to the young men that risked their lives to delivery mail along the 2,000 mile route between California and Kansas, through the Western Frontier. It shares lesser-known facts and trivia about the Pony Express, from the horses, saddles, station houses that made the postal system work.

It reenacts how famous Frontiermen from the 1860s such as Buffalo Bill were affected by the creation and operation of the Pony Express. The American Frontier during this period was also wild and dangerous, with large areas of land occupied by outlaws and hostile Native Americans. The TV special explores how the Pony Express and its riders & station keepers overcame some of these issues.

== Cast ==
- David Abbott as Prairie Station Manager
- Stuart Bentley as Thomas Edison
- Nathan Keeper as Charlie
- Skene Kittle as Wild Bill Hickok
- Gary Layton as Sacramento Superintendent
- Dayleigh Nelson as Buffalo Bill
- Jack Romanuik as Egan Canyon

== Release ==
The 43 minute TV special aired on March 10, 2024, on the INSP network.
