= Johnny Fry =

American pony express rider (1840–1863)

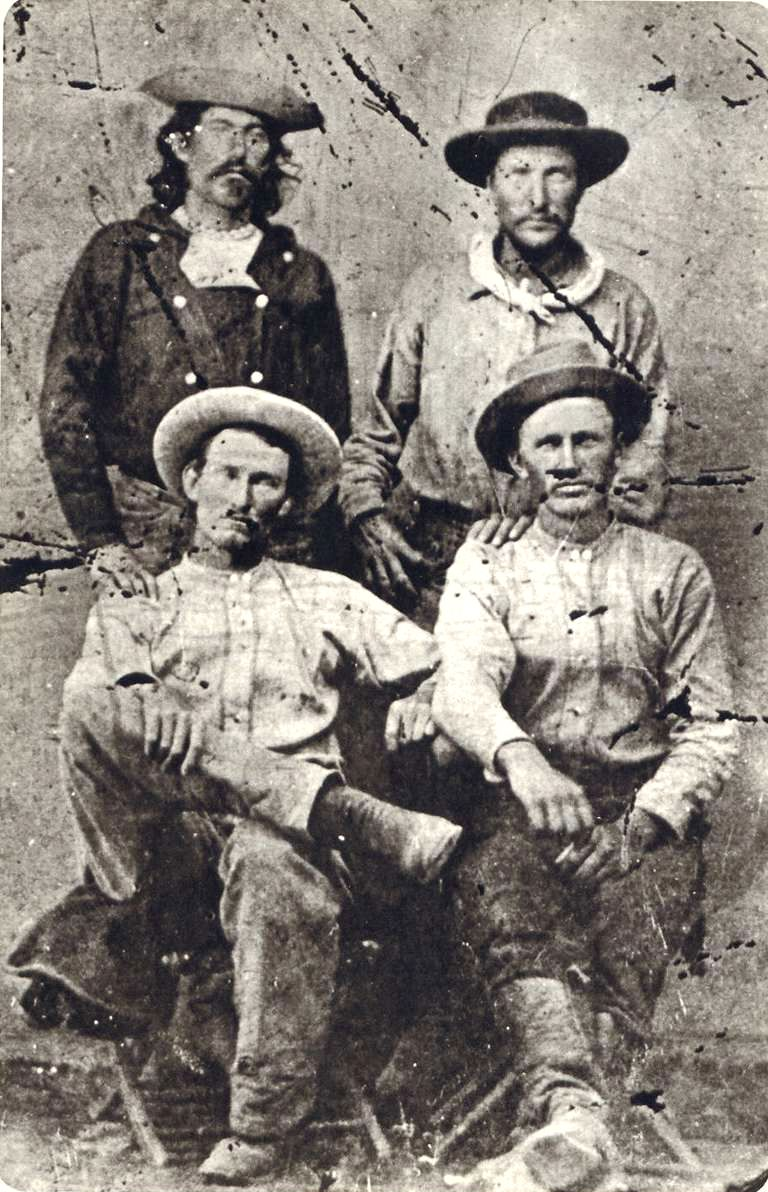
Billy Richardson, Johnny Fry (top right), Charles Cliff, Gus Cliff

John Fry Jr. (1840 – October 6, 1863) was the closing rider on the first westbound Pony Express and later a soldier in the United States Cavalry who was killed in action during the American Civil War.

== Early life and The Pony Express ==
Fry was born in Bourbon County, Kentucky to John Fry Sr., the son of a German immigrant, and Susannah "Sally" Fry (née Humble) in 1840. Sally moved with her son and new husband Benjamin Wells to Rushville, Missouri around 1857.

In the winter of 1860, William H. Russell, Alexander Majors, William B. Waddell and Secretary of War John B. Floyd were working to undermine efforts by the Atlantic & Pacific Mail Company's efforts to secure from Congress $10,000,000 for rail mail service between the westernmost rail head in St. Joseph, Missouri and the gold fields of northern California. At the Willard Hotel, Russell's party bet the Atlantic & Pacific's backers $100,000 that men on horseback could make the journey of 1,950 miles in ten days. The bet resulted in The Pony Express, set to start the next spring, on April 8, 1860.

As an adult, "Johnny" Fry weighed 120 pounds and described as: "Tough and wiry, he was as light as a cat." Fry was assigned the last sixty miles using six thoroughbred horses to do it. While there are no photographs of the start of the Pony Express, the old tin-type of Johnny Fry standing next to Johnson William Richardson in a sailor's hat and jacket, with Charlie Cliff and his brother Gus Cliff, pictures the riders hired by Lewis for Russell, Majors, and Waddell.

The Pony Express failed as economically untenable in October 1861 due to the arrival of the transcontinental telegraph. The American Civil War was underway and Johnny Fry joined the Union Army and was killed by Quantrill's Raiders in the Battle of Baxter Springs.
