= Pony Express Region =

Region in Missouri, U.S.

The Pony Express Region is an area in northwestern Missouri. It takes its name from the Pony Express mail service based in St. Joseph, Missouri. The Pony Express name is historically linked to St Joseph. It is often used to define the city or the St Joseph Metropolitan Area The term is also used for a wider area of northwestern Missouri between Kansas City and Iowa. Pony Express Lake Conservation Area, a 3290-acre park operated by Missouri Department of Conservation, is located east of St Joseph towards Interstate 35.
