= Billy Richardson (Pony Express rider) =

Pony express rider (c.1834–1862)

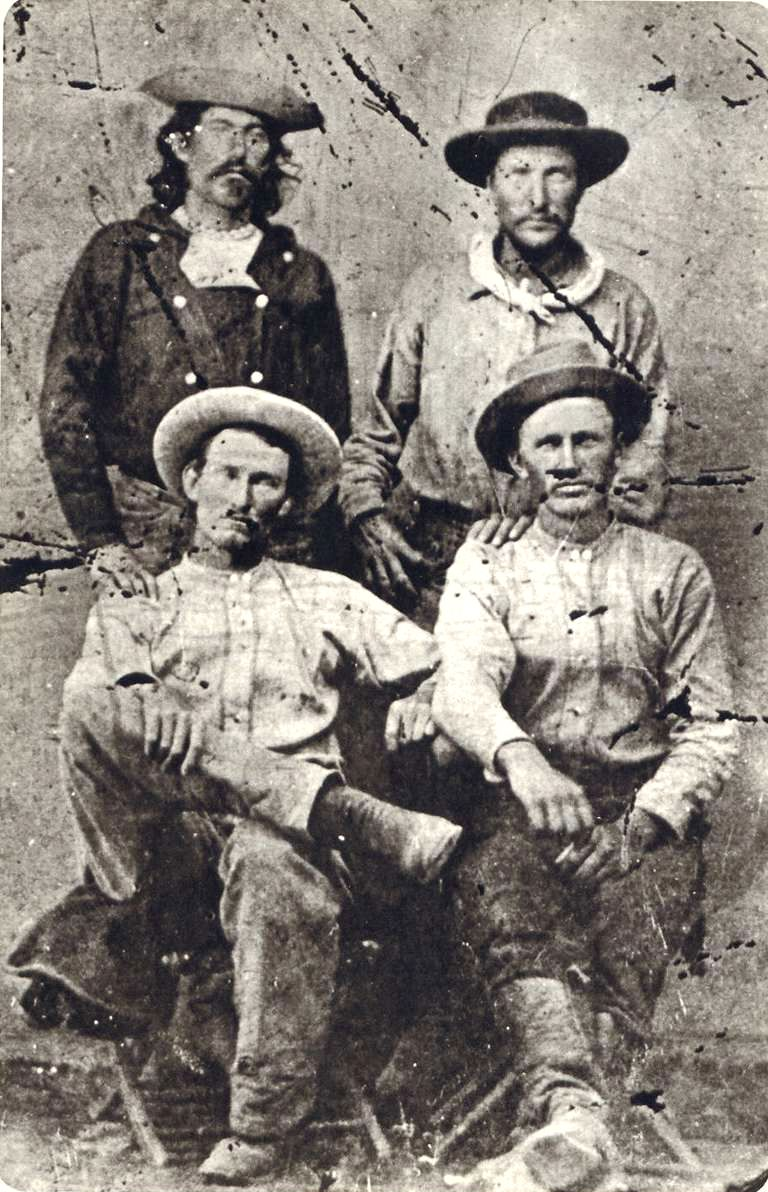
Billy Richardson (top left), Johnny Fry, Charles Cliff, Gus Cliff

Johnson William Richardson (c. 1834–1862) was a Pony Express rider. He was a native of Virginia and at a fairly young age he was shanghaied onto a seagoing freighter where he sailed the icy seas of the North Atlantic. It was a number of years before he found an opportunity to make a successful escape. He ventured to St. Joseph, Missouri where he was employed as a hostler by Fish and Robidoux in 1859. During that time he also rode race horses at a popular track on Sparta Road.

Billy Richardson is believed by many to have been the first westbound rider for the Pony Express. The contemporaneous newspaper account (written within hours of the actual event) as it appeared on April 4, 1860 in the St. Joseph Daily West, recorded him as the first Pony Express rider on April 3, 1860, "The rider is a Mr. Richardson, formerly a sailor, and a man accustomed to every description of hardship, having sailed for years amid the snows and icebergs of the Northern ocean." The article was reprinted in The Weekly West.

In the photo of the four Expressmen, Billy Richardson pictured in a sailor's hat and jacket is standing next to Johnny Fry. Also pictured are Charlie and Gus Cliff, the other Westbound riders for Lewis' division.

Apparently, the expressmen had drawn straws to determine who would make the inaugural ride. Johnny Fry drew the shortest straw, which meant he would make the ride, but injured himself the day before, so Richardson, who was next in line, replaced him.

Years later, a W. B. Richardson (1851–1946) claimed to be the Pony Express rider denied the honor, in an article titled "Uncle Billy Richardson, 91 Today, Disclaims Fame." W. B., who would have been about ten years old the day of the historic ride, boasts that his half brother Paul Coburn, who was the station manager, "accidentally" threw the "mail pouch" on his pony instead of Fry's horse and so he made the ride. His recollection contradicts all historic accounts.

Clearly, J. W. Richardson, the actual rider, was not W. B. Richardson, a nine- or ten-year-old boy, but a grown man when he was hired by Lewis for Russell, Majors and Waddell. He rode for the company until the transcontinental telegraph went into service. According to his relatives he rode on to Fort Laramie and died later that year.
