= Stagecoach, Nevada =

- Census-designated place
- Location within the state of Nevada
- Coordinates: 39°22′26″N 119°22′27″W
- Country: United States
- State: Nevada
- County: Lyon

Area
  - Total: 8.34 sq mi (21.61 km^{2})
  - Land: 8.34 sq mi (21.61 km^{2})
  - Water: 0 sq mi (0.00 km^{2})
- Elevation: 4,347 ft (1,325 m)

Population (2020)
  - Total: 2,022
  - Density: 242.3/sq mi (93.55/km^{2})
- Time zone: UTC-8 (Pacific (PST))
  - Summer (DST): UTC-7 (PDT)
- ZIP codes: 89429
- FIPS code: 32-68800
- GNIS feature ID: 0850746

Stagecoach is an unincorporated community and census-designated place (CDP) in Lyon County, Nevada, United States, located east of Reno. Its name is likely derived from its place as the Overland Stagecoach station at Desert Well. Typically, the mail that was heading towards California was delivered on a steamship through Panama. But in 1857, the Overland mail company was created, and the Desert Well station was a dual stop for both the stagecoach line and the Pony Express.

As of the 2020 census, Stagecoach had a population of 2,022.

== Geography ==
Stagecoach is located along U.S. Route 50, 9 miles (14 km) west of Silver Springs, 16 miles (26 km) northeast of Dayton and 27 miles (43 km) east of Carson City. According to the U.S. Census Bureau, the Stagecoach CDP has an area of 8.3 square miles (21.6 km^{2}), all land.

== Demographics ==
Historical population
Census	Pop.	Note	%±
2020	2,022		—
U.S. Decennial Census

=== 2020 census ===
As of the 2020 census, Stagecoach had a population of 2,022. The median age was 50.7 years. 16.9% of residents were under the age of 18 and 25.3% of residents were 65 years of age or older. For every 100 females there were 101.4 males, and for every 100 females age 18 and over there were 103.8 males age 18 and over.

0.0% of residents lived in urban areas, while 100.0% lived in rural areas.

There were 827 households in Stagecoach, of which 23.0% had children under the age of 18 living in them. Of all households, 50.4% were married-couple households, 19.7% were households with a male householder and no spouse or partner present, and 22.4% were households with a female householder and no spouse or partner present. About 23.2% of all households were made up of individuals and 15.5% had someone living alone who was 65 years of age or older.

There were 902 housing units, of which 8.3% were vacant. The homeowner vacancy rate was 1.3% and the rental vacancy rate was 4.8%.

Racial composition as of the 2020 census
Race	Number	Percent
White	1,651	81.7%
Black or African American	1	0.0%
American Indian and Alaska Native	41	2.0%
Asian	31	1.5%
Native Hawaiian and Other Pacific Islander	7	0.3%
Some other race	50	2.5%
Two or more races	241	11.9%
Hispanic or Latino (of any race)	198	9.8%
