= Patee Town Historic District =

Historic district in Missouri, United States

- U.S. National Register of Historic Places
- U.S. Historic district
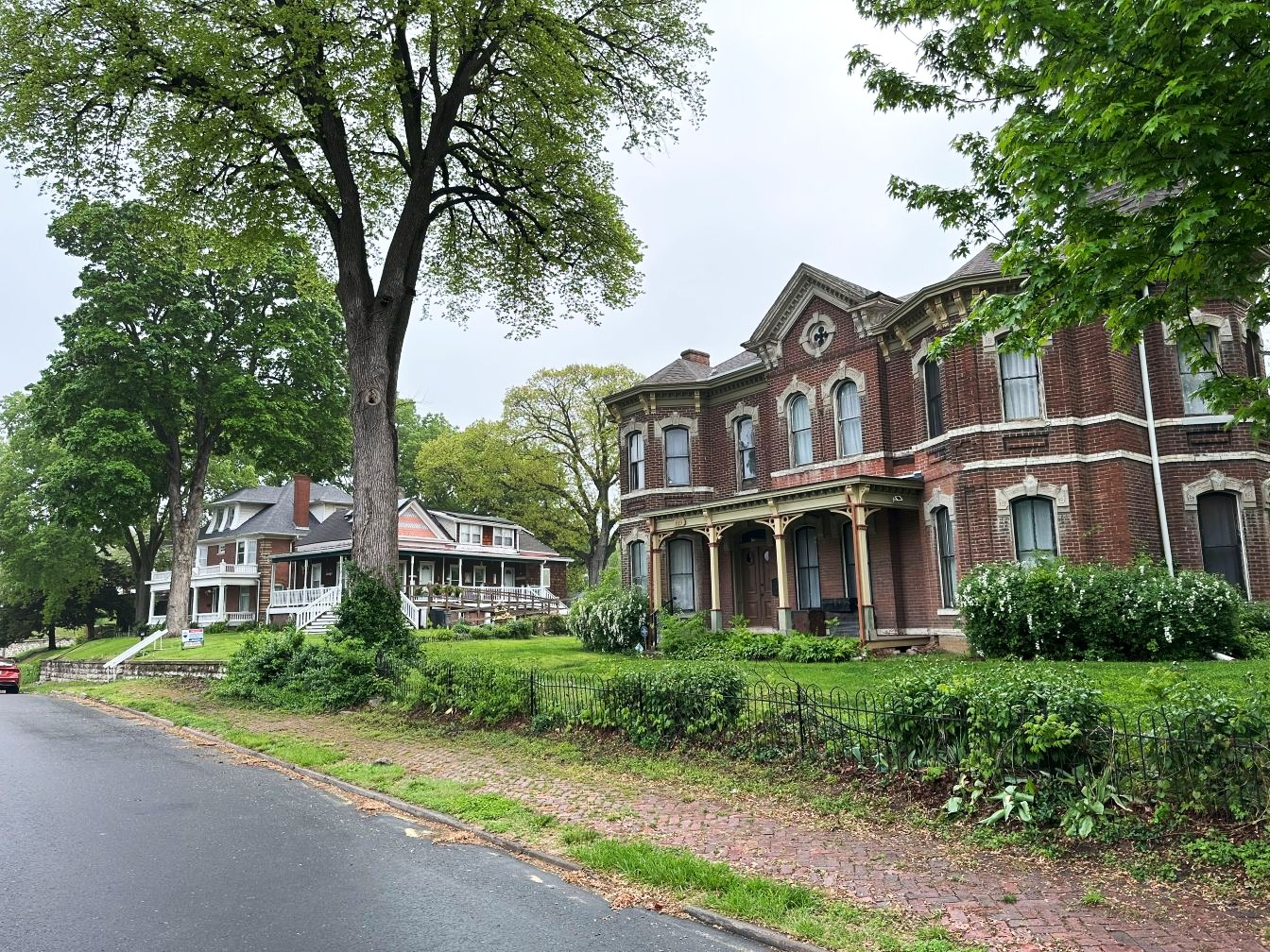

- Location within Missouri Location within the United States
- Location: Roughly bounded by Penn St., S. 11th St., Lafayette St. and S. 15th St., St. Joseph, Missouri
- Coordinates: 39°45′33″N 94°50′36″W
- Area: 19.4 acres (7.9 ha)
- Architect: Louis Stigers; E.J. Eckel
- Architectural style: Greek Revival, Italianate, et al.
- MPS: St. Joseph MPS
- NRHP reference No.: 02000818
- Added to NRHP: August 1, 2002

Patee Town Historic District is a national historic district located at St. Joseph, Missouri. The district encompasses 71 contributing buildings and 1 contributing site in the Patee Town section of St. Joseph. It developed between about 1858 and 1939, and includes representative examples of Greek Revival and Italianate style architecture. Located in the district are the separately listed Patee House, a hotel that is a U.S. National Historic Landmark, and Jesse James House. Other notable buildings include the Morey Piro House (1910), Charles E. Herycele House (1903), R. L. McDonald Manufacturing Co. Warehouse (1899), Mrs. Pemetia Cornish Duplex (c. 1886), Fred Wenz Store Building (1903), Fire Station #5 (1939), German Salems Church (later, Bne Jacob Synagogue, c. 1880, 1927), and Matthew Ziebold House (1895).

It was listed on the National Register of Historic Places in 2002.
