= Pony Express Museum =

- Pony Express Stables
- U.S. National Register of Historic Places
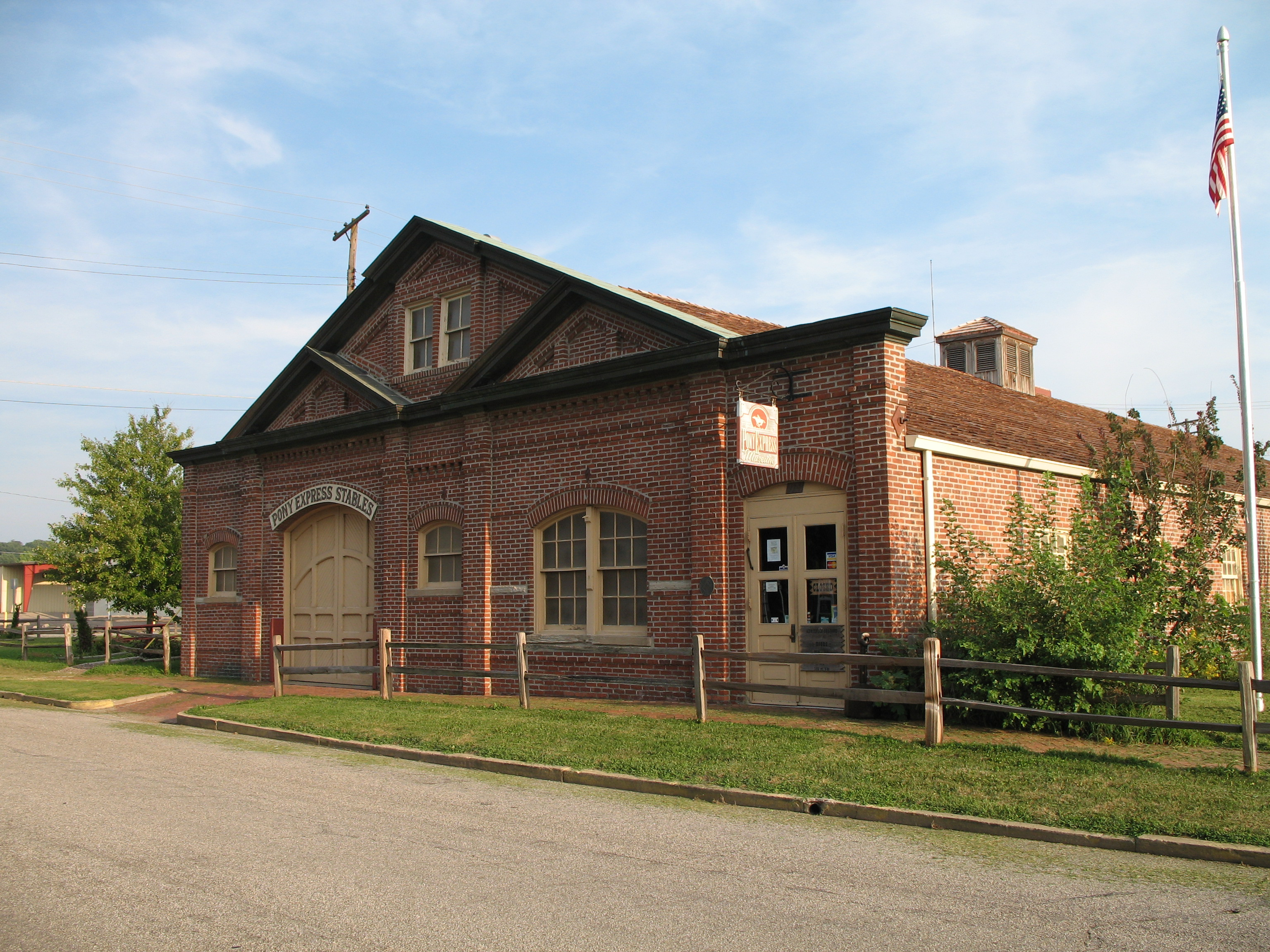
- The historic stables at the Pony Express National Museum

- Location within Missouri Location within the United States
- Location: 914 Penn Street, St. Joseph, Missouri
- Coordinates: 39°45′21.96″N 94°50′57.02″W
- Area: 9.9 acres (4.0 ha)
- Built: 1858, 1888
- Built by: Holladay, Benjamin
- NRHP reference No.: 70000322
- Added to NRHP: April 3, 1970

The Pony Express Museum is a transport museum in Saint Joseph, Missouri, documenting the history of the Pony Express, the first fast mail line across the North American continent from the Missouri River to the Pacific coast. The museum is housed in a surviving portion of the Pike's Peak Stables, from which westward-bound Pony Express riders set out on their journey.

The Pony Express Museum is one of the most historically educational museums in the country in respect to the legendary mail service that ran from April 3, 1860 to October 26, 1861. Between exhibits, a 7-part diorama, maps, an archeological dig and artifacts, the museum has entertained and educated visitors from all over the world.

The museum celebrated the 150th anniversary (Sesquicentennial) of the Pony Express on April 1–3, 2010 which drew over 10,000 people. The museum is located at 914 Penn Street, St. Joseph, Missouri. In 2011, the museum produced a live action documentary titled Days of the Pony Express produced by Jim Conlon with Scout Films. The film was given a favorable review by Wild West Magazine.

== Stables ==
The Pony Express Stables, also known as Pike's Peak Stables, is a historic stable building located at St. Joseph, Missouri. It is a one-story building, originally built as a wood-frame structure in 1858. Its exterior walls were rebuilt in brick in 1888, whether keeping the original structure intact and/or reused some of its posts and beams. The building marked the eastern terminus of the Pony Express. It is now the home of the museum.

The building, originally Pike's Peak Stable, was built for care of horses of the local freight and stagecoach company. It was bought in 1860 by the Central Overland California and Pike's Peak Express Company to be used for the Pony Express. In the first Pony Express run on April 3, 1860, William (Billie) Richardson left from here to go the Patee House to pick up a waiting mochilla, then headed west.

The building was restored in 1950 by the Goetz Foundation and the Pony Express National Memorial museum was then established. The building is 58.33 by 55.25 feet (17.78 m × 16.84 m) in plan. Its front (north) and side walls are coursed brick, two bricks thick. As of 1970, the rear wall is wood frame on a brick foundation, covered by asbestos board.

It was listed on the National Register of Historic Places in 1970.
