= Buckland Station =

- U.S. National Register of Historic Places
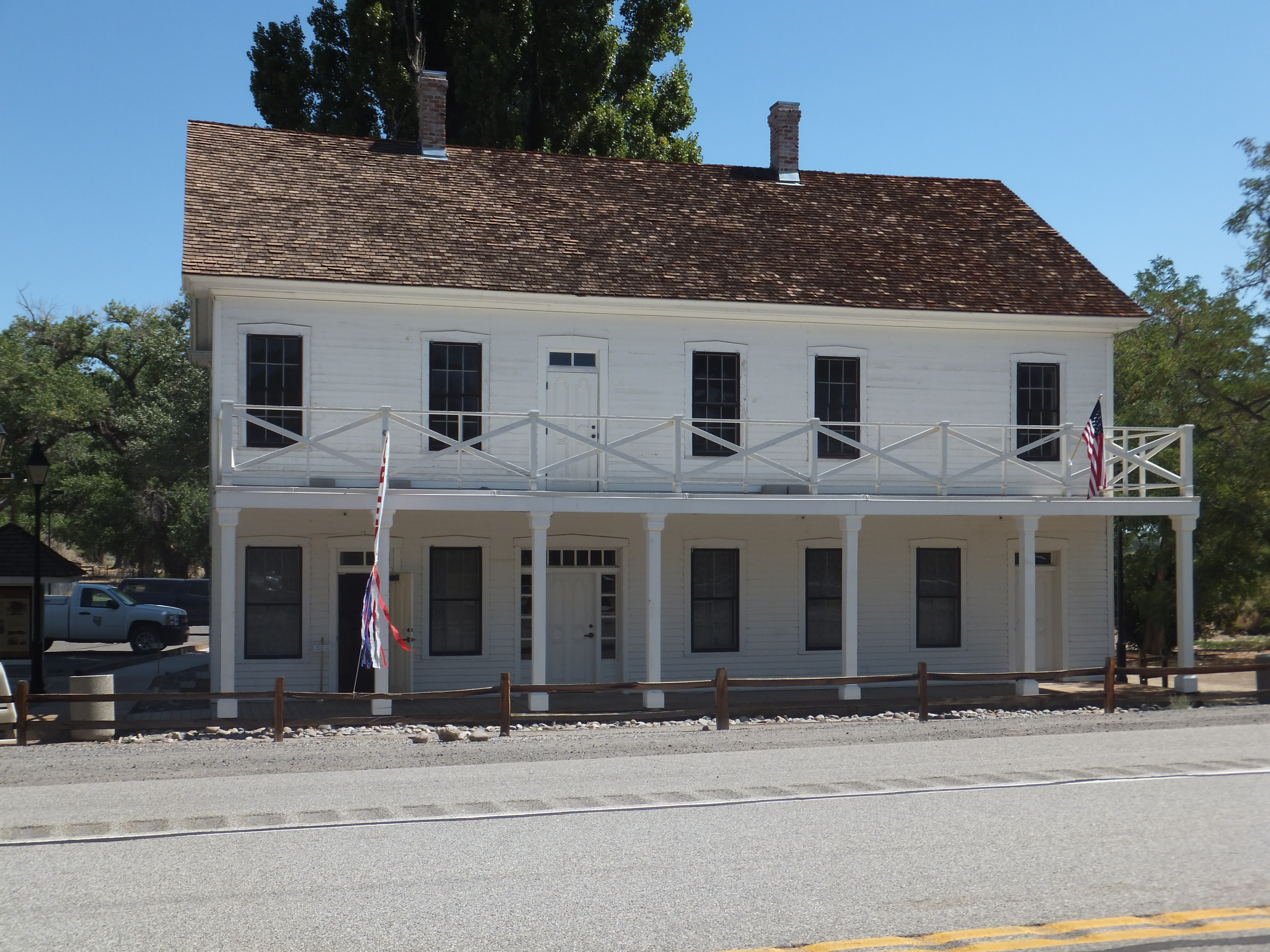

- Location within Nevada Location within the United States
- Location: 7 miles south of the junction of U.S. Route 50 and U.S. Route 95 Alternate
- Nearest city: Stagecoach, Nevada
- Coordinates: 39°17′40″N 119°15′2″W
- Area: less than one acre
- Built: c.1870
- Built by: Buckland, Samuel
- Architectural style: Greek Revival
- NRHP reference No.: 97001546
- Added to NRHP: December 29, 1997

Buckland Station, a stagecoach station and hotel near Stagecoach, Nevada, was built c. 1870 by Samuel Buckland, proprietor (who settled here in 1859), replaced a previous stage station. It was built with simplified Greek Revival style. It was listed on the National Register of Historic Places (NRHP) in 1997.

The existing Buckland building was built mostly of salvaged lumber from dismantling Ft. Churchill. Buckland Station formerly existed as a Pony Express station and as an emigrant stop and to serve an early bridge over the Carson River.

When listed on the NRHP, the building had just been purchased by the state of Nevada, which has continuing plans for its rehabilitation. It is located two miles east of Fort Churchill State Historic Park.
