= Friday's Station =

- U.S. National Register of Historic Places
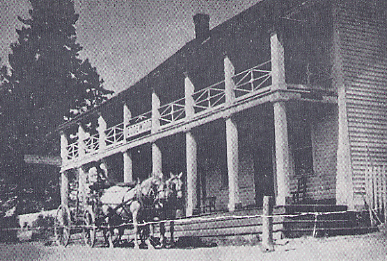

- Location within Nevada Location within the United States
- Location: US 50 between Kingsbury Grade and Loop Rd., Stateline, Nevada
- Coordinates: 38°57′56.4″N 119°56′8.95″W
- Area: 7.6 acres (3.1 ha)
- Built: 1860
- NRHP reference No.: 86003259
- Added to NRHP: October 9, 1986

Friday's Station, on US 50 between Kingsbury Grade and Loop Road in Stateline, Nevada, was originally a two-story log-frame building prior to the addition of white lumber siding. It served as a Pony Express station and inn in 1860. In 1986, it was known as Park Cattle Company Residence and was listed on the National Register of Historic Places. The two-story log-frame white building is visible from U.S. Route 50 near the California-Nevada border at Stateline, Nevada.

When built, it was also a Union Army military post of the District of California.

During the 1870s through the 1880s it operated as a resort under the name "Buttermilk Bonanza Ranch." The listing included two contributing buildings: the second was a blacksmith shop and stable added to the rear of the inn.

The nearest locale was called Smalls by 1891, but had changed its name to Tahoe Village by 1955.

The interior of the building has undergone several remodels throughout its history, but the original floor plan included space for both a restaurant and a saloon on the lower floor. The upper floor has remained largely unchanged since its construction, except that it now features bathrooms which were not part of the original structure. It is the only Pony Express station in the state of Nevada to survive in a largely intact form.

It is designated as California Historical Landmark #728.
