= Pony Express =

1860–1861 mail service in the United States

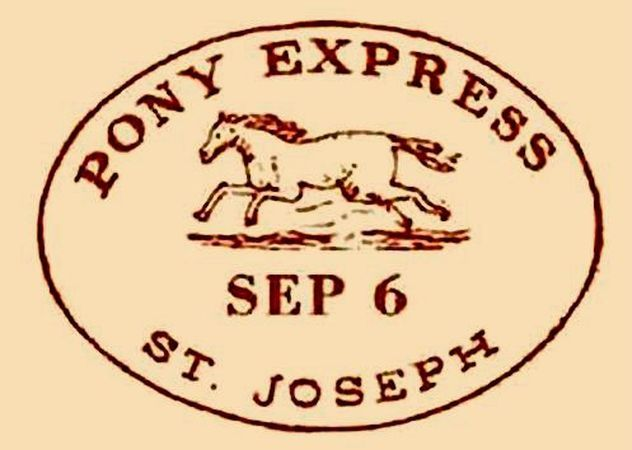
- Type: Express mail
- Industry: Postal service
- Founded: April 3, 1860; 166 years ago in St. Joseph, Missouri, United States
- Founders: Alexander Majors; William Hepburn Russell; William Bradford Waddell
- Defunct: October 26, 1861; 165 years ago
- Fate: Bankrupt
- Headquarters: Patee House, St. Joseph, Missouri, United States
- Areas served: St. Joseph, Missouri, Sacramento, California
- Owner: Ben Holladay
- Parent: Central Overland California and Pikes Peak Express Company

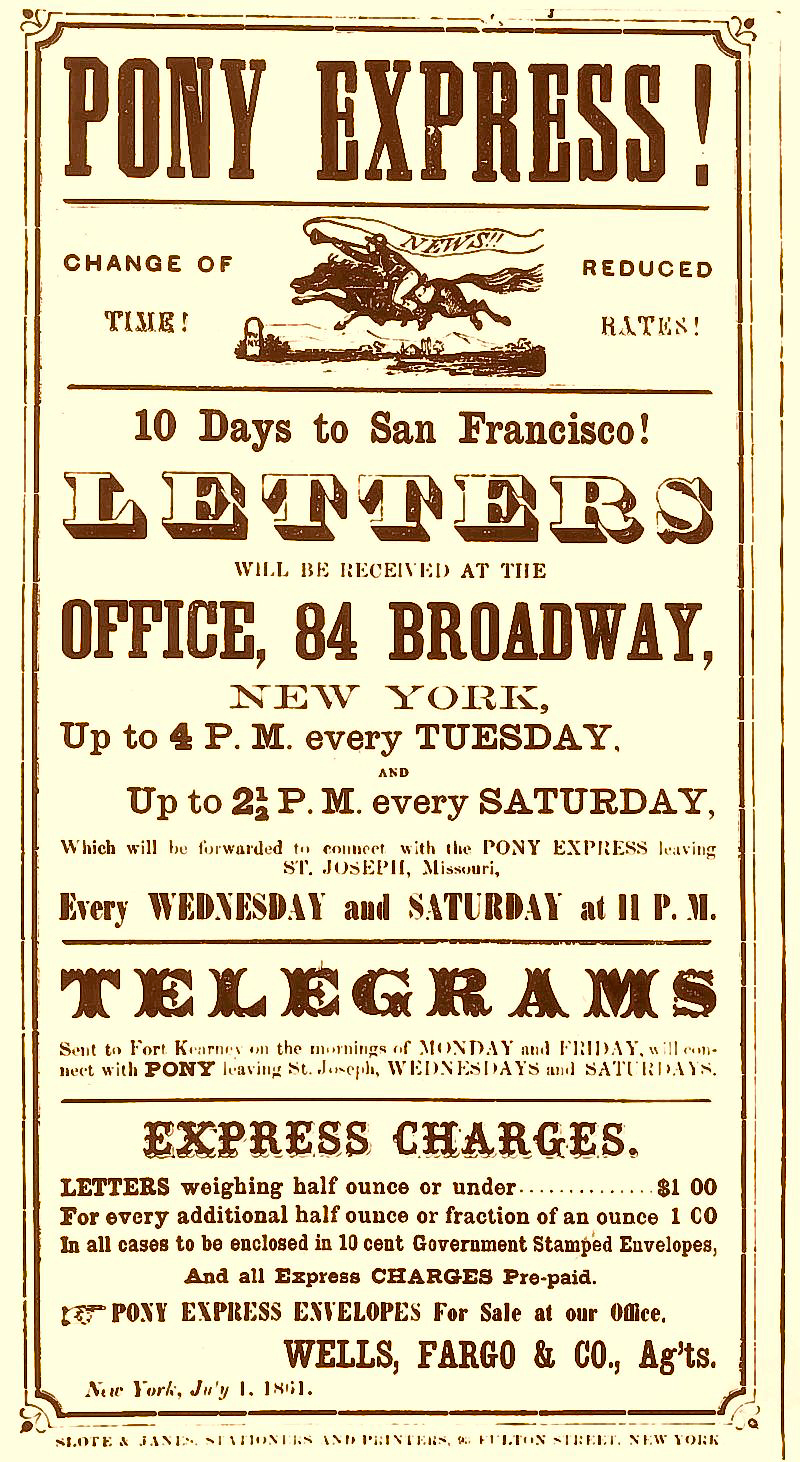
Pony Express advertisement

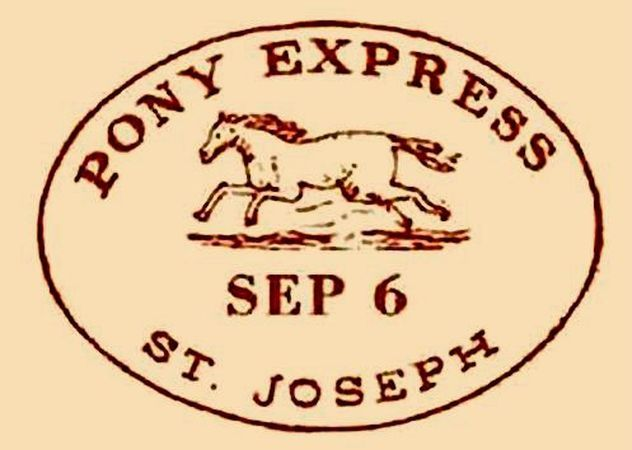
Pony Express postmark, 1860, westbound

The Pony Express was an American express mail service that used relays of horse-mounted riders between Missouri and California. It was operated by the Central Overland California and Pikes Peak Express Company.

During its 18 months of operation beginning in 1860, the Pony Express reduced the time for messages to travel between the east and west US coast to about 10 days. It became the west's most direct means of east–west communication before the first transcontinental telegraph was established (October 24, 1861), and was vital for tying the new state of California with the rest of the United States.

Despite a heavy subsidy, the Pony Express was not a financial success and went bankrupt in 18 months, when a faster telegraph service was established. Nevertheless, it demonstrated that a unified transcontinental system of communications could be established and operated year-round. When it was replaced by the telegraph, the Pony Express quickly became romanticized and became part of the lore of the Old West. Its reliance on the ability and endurance of hardy riders and fast horses was seen as evidence of rugged American individualism of the frontier times.

== Inception and founding ==
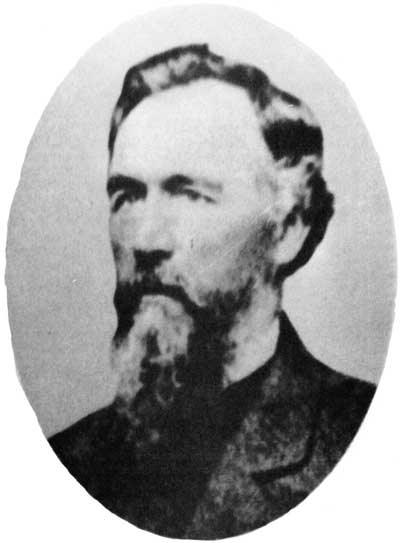
Alexander Majors

The idea of having a fast mail route to the Pacific Coast was prompted largely by California's newfound prominence and its rapidly growing population. After gold was discovered there in 1848, thousands of prospectors, investors, and businessmen made their way to California, at that time a new territory of the U.S. By 1850, California had entered the Union as a free state. By 1860, the population had grown to 380,000. The prospect of California and its national role became the source of bitter partisan debate in Congress. The demand for a faster way to get the mail and other documents to and from this westernmost state became even greater as the American Civil War approached.

William Russell, Alexander Majors, and William Bradford Waddell were the three founders of the Pony Express. They were already in the freighting and drayage business. At the peak of the operations, they employed 6,000 men, owned 75,000 oxen, thousands of wagons, and warehouses, plus a sawmill, a meatpacking plant, a bank, and an insurance company.

Russell was a prominent businessman, well respected among his peers and the community. Waddell was co-owner of the firm Morehead, Waddell & Co. In 1859, C. R. Morehead took the proposal for the Pony Express to President Buchanan. After Morehead was bought out and moved to Leavenworth to enter the mercantile business, Waddell merged his company with Russell's, changing the name to Waddell & Russell. In 1855, they took on a new partner, Alexander Majors, and founded the company of Russell, Majors & Waddell. They held government contracts for delivering army supplies to the western frontier, and Russell had a similar idea for contracts with the U.S. government for fast mail delivery.

By using a short route over the Sierra Nevada, surveyed and designed by Sherman Day in 1856, and using mounted riders rather than traditional stagecoaches, they proposed to establish a fast mail service between St. Joseph, Missouri, and Sacramento, California, with letters delivered in 10 days, which many said was impossible. The initial price was set at $5 per 1/2 ounce (14 g), then $2.50, and by July 1861 to $1. The initial price was 250 times the price of mail through the normal mail service, which was $0.02. The founders of the Pony Express hoped to win an exclusive government mail contract, but that did not come about.

Russell, Majors, and Waddell organized and put together the Pony Express in two months in the winter of 1860. The undertaking assembled 80 riders, 184 stations, 400 horses, and several hundred personnel during January and February 1861.

Majors was a religious man and resolved "by the help of God" to overcome all difficulties. He presented each rider with a Pony Express special-edition Bible and required this oath, which they were also required to sign.

I, ... , do hereby swear, before the Great and Living God, that during my engagement, and while I am an employee of Russell, Majors, and Waddell, I will, under no circumstances, use profane language, that I will drink no intoxicating liquors, that I will not quarrel or fight with any other employee of the firm, and that in every respect I will conduct myself honestly, be faithful to my duties, and so direct all my acts as to win the confidence of my employers, so help me God.

— Oath sworn by Pony Express Riders

== Operation ==
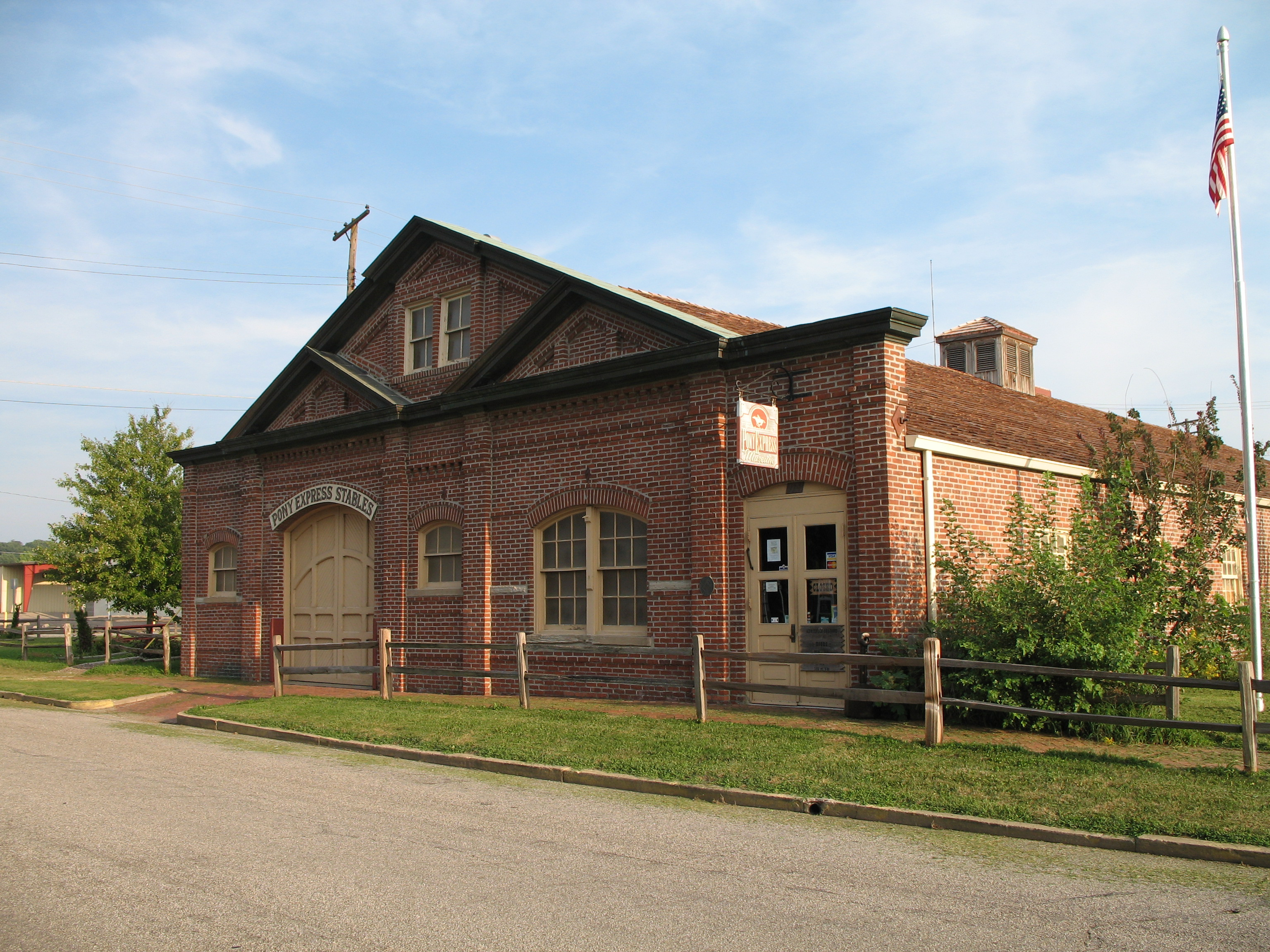
Pony Express Stables in St. Joseph, Missouri

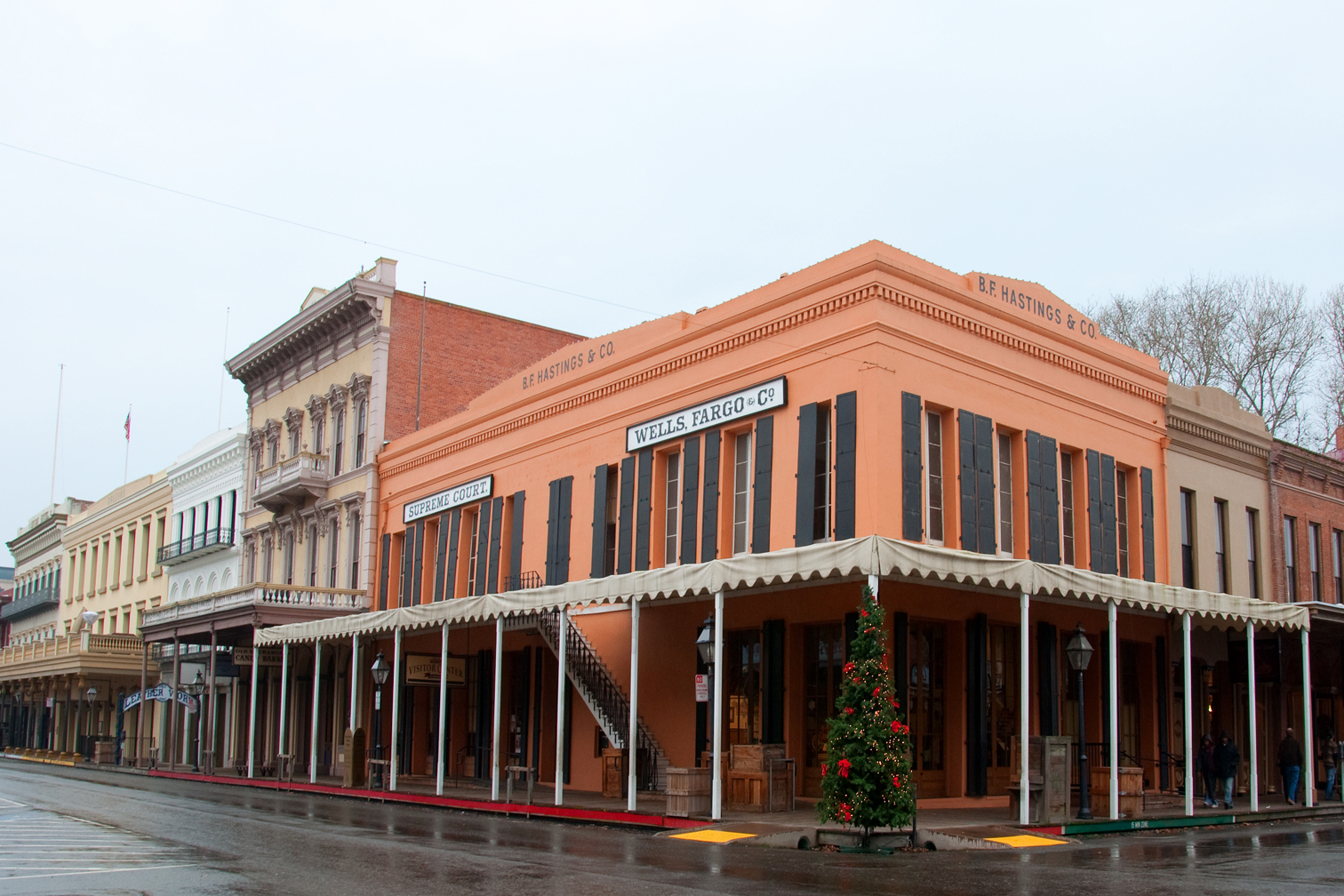
The B.F. Hastings Bank Building in Sacramento, California, western terminus of the Pony Express

Riders rode, for 75 to 100 miles, in all weather, as a 24/7 service.

In 1860, the roughly 186 Pony Express stations were about 10 to 15 miles (16 to 24 km) apart along the Pony Express route. At each station, the express rider would change to a fresh horse, get a bite to eat, and would only take the mail pouch called a mochila (from the Spanish for pouch or backpack) with him.

The employers stressed the importance of the pouch. They often said that, if it came to be, the horse and rider should perish before the mochila did. The mochila was thrown over the saddle and held in place by the weight of the rider sitting on it. Each corner had a cantina, or pocket. Bundles of mail were placed in these cantinas, which were padlocked for safety. The mochila could hold 20 pounds (9 kg) of mail along with the 20 pounds (9 kg) of material carried on the horse. Eventually, everything except one revolver and a water sack was removed, allowing for a total of 165 pounds (75 kg) on the horse's back. Riders, who could not weigh over 125 pounds (57 kg), changed about every 75–100 miles (120–160 km), and rode day and night. In emergencies, a given rider might ride two stages back to back, over 20 hours on a quickly moving horse.

Whether riders tried crossing the Sierra Nevada in winter is unknown, but they certainly crossed central Nevada. By 1860, a telegraph station was in Carson City, Nevada Territory. The riders received $125 a month as pay. As a comparison, the wage for unskilled labor at the time was about $0.43–1.00 per day, and for semi-skilled laborers like bricklayers and carpenters was usually less than $2 per day.

Alexander Majors, one of the founders of the Pony Express, had acquired more than 400 horses for the project. He selected horses from around the west, paying an average of $200. These averaged about 14.2 hands (58 inches, 147 cm) high and 900 pounds (410 kg) each; thus, the name pony was appropriate, even if not strictly correct in all cases.

== Pony Express route ==
Beginning at St. Joseph, Missouri, the approximately 1,900-mile-long (3,100 km) route roughly followed the Oregon and California trails to Fort Bridger in Wyoming, and then the Mormon Trail (known as the Hastings Cutoff) to Salt Lake City, Utah. From there, it followed the Central Nevada Route to Carson City, Nevada Territory, before passing over the Sierra and reaching to Sacramento, California. From there mail was transferred to boats to go downriver to San Francisco or, on occasion, via a combination of riders and ferries to the destination.

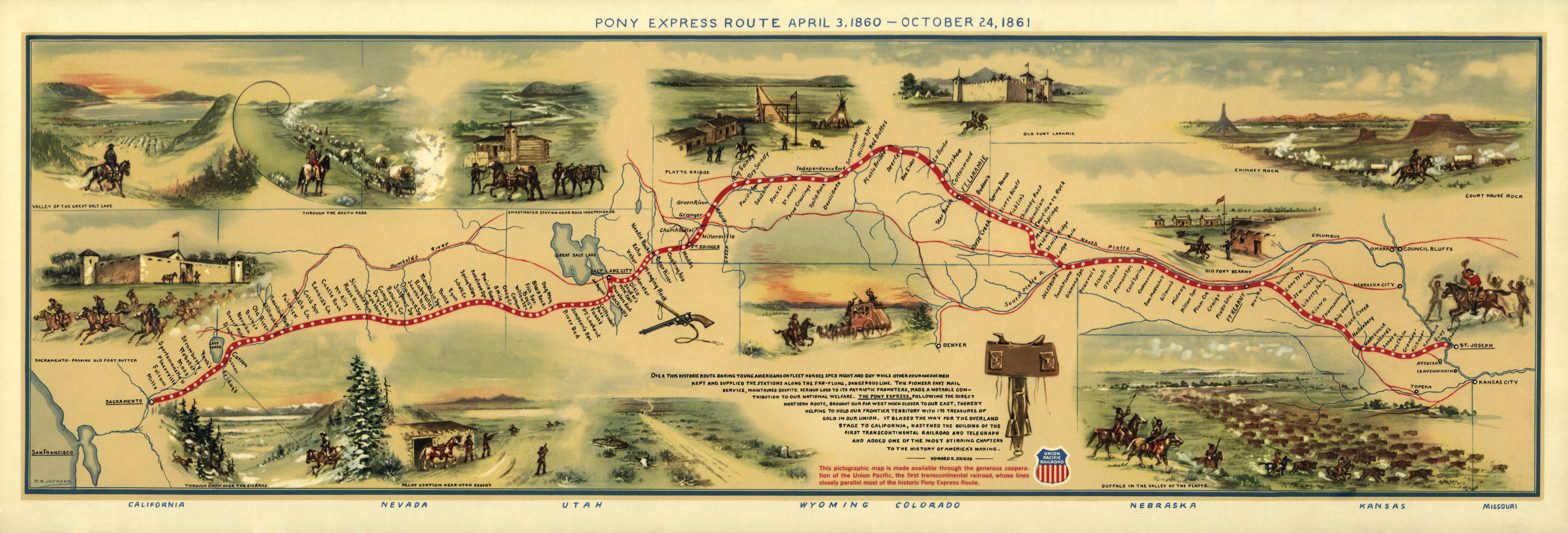
Illustrated Map of Pony Express Route in 1860 by William Henry Jackson ~ Courtesy the Library of Congress ~ The Pony Express mail route, April 3, 1860 – October 24, 1861; reproduction of Jackson illustration issued to commemorate the 100th anniversary of Pony Express founding on April 3, 1960. Reproduction of Jackson's map issued by the Union Pacific Railroad Company.

The route started at St. Joseph, Missouri, on the Missouri River, and then followed what is modern-day U.S. Highway 36 (the Pony Express Highway) to Marysville, Kansas, where it turned northwest following Little Blue River to Fort Kearny in Nebraska. Through Nebraska, it followed the Great Platte River Road, cutting through Gothenburg, Nebraska, clipping the edge of Colorado at Julesburg; and passing Courthouse Rock, Chimney Rock, and Scotts Bluff, before arriving first at Fort Laramie and then Fort Caspar (Platte Bridge Station) in Wyoming. From there, it followed the Sweetwater River, passing Independence Rock, Devil's Gate, and Split Rock, through South Pass to Fort Bridger and then south to Salt Lake City, Utah. From Salt Lake City, it generally followed the Central Nevada Route blazed in 1859 by Captain James H. Simpson of the Corps of Topographical Engineers. This route roughly follows today's US 50 across Nevada and Utah. It crossed the Great Basin, the Utah-Nevada Desert, and the Sierra Nevada near Lake Tahoe before arriving in Sacramento. Mail was transferred and sent by steamer down the Sacramento River to San Francisco. An alternative overland route was used for the first month and whenever the steamer departure was missed. The alternative route, roughly following first today's Interstate 80, then Interstate 680, then California Route 24, took the mail by horseback through Benicia, California. This route would then cross the Carquinez Strait via ferry to Martinez, then on horseback onward to Oakland and across the San Francisco Bay by ferry to San Francisco.

=== Stations ===
Along the long and arduous route used by the Pony Express, 190 stations were used. The stations and station keepers were essential to the successful, timely, and smooth operation of the Pony Express mail system. The stations were often fashioned out of existing structures, several of them located in military forts, while others were built anew in remote areas where living conditions were basic. The route was divided into five divisions. To maintain the rigid schedule, 157 relay stations were located from 5 to 25 miles (8 to 40 km) apart, as the terrain would allow. At each "swing station", riders would exchange their tired mounts for fresh ones, while "home stations" provided room and board for the riders between runs. This technique allowed the mail to be moved across the continent in record time. Each rider rode about 75 miles (120 km) per day.

Pony Express Stations
Division One: Stations between St. Joseph and Fort Kearney

Missouri:
1. St. Joseph Station

Kansas:
2. Troy Station
3. Lewis Station
4. Kennekuk (Kinnekuk) Station
5. Kickapoo, Goteschall Station
6. Log Chain Station
7. Seneca Station
8. Ash Point, Laramie Creek Station
9. Guittard Station (aka Gantard's, Guttard)
10. Marysville Station
11. Cottonwood, Hollenberg Station
12. Atchison Station
13. Lancaster Station

Nebraska:
14. Rock House Station
15. Rock Creek Station
16. Virginia City
17. Big Sandy Station
18. Millersville, Thompson's Station
19. Kiowa Station
20. Little Blue, Oak Grove Station
21. Liberty Farm Station
22. Spring Ranch, Lone Tree Station
23. Thirty-two Mile Creek Station
24. Sand Hill, Summit Station
25. Hook's, Kearney, Valley Station
26. Fort Kearney

Division Two: Stations between Fort Kearney and Horseshoe Creek

Nebraska (continued):
27. Seventeen Mile, Platte Station
28. Garden Station
29. Plum Creek Station
30. Willow Island, Willow Bend Station
31. Cold Water, Midway Ranch Station
32. Gilman's Station
33. Machette's Station (Gothenburg)
34. Cottonwood Springs Station
35. Cold Springs Station
36. Fremont Springs Station
37. O'Fallon's Bluff, Dansey's/Elkhorn Station
38. Alkali Lake Station
39. Gill's, Sand Hill Station

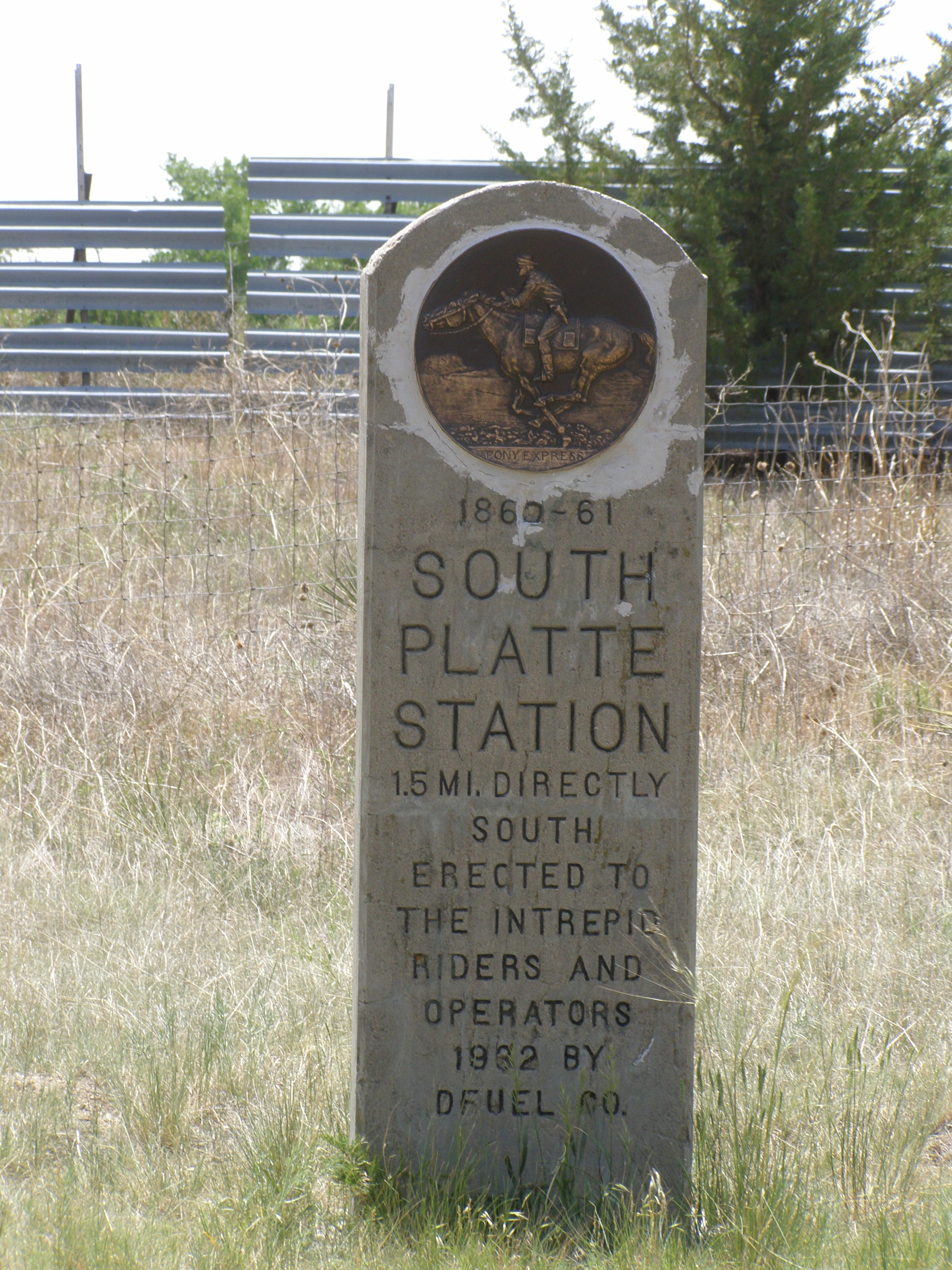
Pony Express Marker along the South Platte River in western Nebraska on US 30 (Lincoln Hwy)

40. Diamond Springs Station
41. Beauvais Ranch Station

Colorado:
42. Frontz's/South Platte Station
43. Julesburg Station

Nebraska (continued):
44. Nine Mile Station
45. Pole Creek No. 2 Station
46. Pole Creek No. 3 Station
47. Midway Station
48. Mud Springs Station
49. Court House (Rock) Station
50. Chimney Rock Station
51. Ficklin's Springs Station
52. Scott's Bluff(s) Station
53. Horse Creek Station

Wyoming:
54. Cold Springs, Spring Ranch/Torrington Station
55. Verdling's, Bordeaux, Bedeau's Ranch/Fort Benard Station
56. Fort Laramie Station
57. Nine Mile, Sand Point, Ward's, Central Star Station
58. Cottonwood Station
59. Horseshoe Creek, Horseshoe Station

Division Three: Stations between Horseshoe Creek and Salt Lake City

Wyoming (continued) :
60. Elk Horn Station
61. La Bonte Station
62. Bed Tick Station
63. Lapierelle/La Prele Station
64. Box Elder (Creek) Station
65. Deer Creek Station
66. Little Muddy Station
67. Bridger Station
68. Fort Caspar, Platte Bridge/North Platte Station
69. Red Butte (s) Station
70. Willow Springs Station
71. Horse, Greesewood Creek Station
72. Sweetwater Station
73. Devil's Gate Station
74. Plant's, Plante Station
75. Split Rock Station
76. Three Crossings Station
77. Ice Slough, Ice Springs Station
78. Warm Springs Station
79. Rocky Ridge, St. Mary's Station
80. Rock Creek Station
81. Upper Sweetwater, South Pass Station
82. Pacific Springs Station
83. Dry Sandy Station
84. Little Sandy Creek Station
85. Big Sandy Station
86. Big Timber Station
87. Green River Station (crossing Station)
88. Michael Martin's Station
89. Ham's Fork Station
90. Church Buttes Station
91. Millersville Station
92. Fort Bridger
93. Muddy Creek Station
94. Quaking Asp, Aspen, Springs Station
95. Bear River Station

Utah:
96. The Needles, Needle Rock(s) Station
97. (Head of) Echo Canyon Station
98. Halfway Station
99. Weber Station
100. Brimville Emergency Station
101. Carson House Station
102. East Canyon Station
103. Wheaton Springs Station
104. Mountain Dell/Dale Station
105. Salt Lake City Station

Division Four: Stations between Salt Lake City and Robert's Creek

Utah (continued):
106. Trader's Rest, Traveler's Rest Station
107. Rockwell's Station (Hot Springs Hotel and Brewery)
108. Dugout, Joe's Dugout Station
109. Camp Floyd, Fairfield Station
110. Pass, East Rush Valley Station
111. Rush Valley, Faust's Station
112. Point Lookout, Lookout Pass Station
113. Government Creek Station
114. Simpson's Springs, Egan's Springs Station
115. River Bed Station
116. Dugway Station
117. Black Rock Station
118. Fish Springs Station
119. Boyd's Station
120. Willow Springs Station
121. Willow Creek Station
122. Canyon, Burnt Station
123. Deep Creek Station

Nevada:
124. Prairie Gate, Eight Mile Station
125. Antelope Springs Station
126. Spring Valley Station
127. Schell Creek Station
128. Egan's Canyon, Egan's Station
129. Bates', Butte Station
130. Mountain Spring(s) Station
131. Ruby Valley Station
132. Jacob's Well Station
133. Diamond Springs Station
134. Sulphur Springs Station
135. Robert's Creek Station

Division Five: Stations between Roberts Creek and Sacramento

Nevada (continued): 136. Camp Station, Grub(b)s Well Station
137. Dry Creek Station
138. Simpson Park Station
139. Reese River, Jacob's Spring Station
140. Dry Wells Station
141. Smith's Creek Station
142. Castle Rock Station
143. Edward's Creek Station
144. Cold Springs, East Gate Station
145. Middle Gate Station
146. West Gate Station
147. Sand Springs Station
148. Sand Hill Station
149. Carson Sink Station
150. Williams Station
151. Desert, Hooten Wells Station
152. Buckland's Station
153. Fort Churchill Station
154. Fairview Station
155. Mountain Well Station
156. Stillwater Station
157. Old River Station
158. Bisby's Station
159. Nevada Station
160. Ragtown Station
161. Desert Wells Station
162. Miller's, Reed's Station
163. Dayton Station
164. Carson City Station
165. Genoa Station
166. Friday's, Lakeside Station

California:
167. Woodford's Station
168. Fountain Place Station
169. Yank's Station
170. Strawberry Station
171. Webster's, Sugar Loaf House Station
172. Moss/Moore, Riverton Station
173. Sportsman's Hall Station
174. Placerville Station
175. El Dorado, Nevada House/Mud Springs Station
176. Mormon Tavern, Sunrise House Station
177. Fifteen Mile House Station
178. Five Mile House Station
179. Pleasant Grove House Station
180. Duroc Station
181. Folsom Station
182. Sacramento Station
183. Benicia Station
184. Martinez Station
185. Oakland Station

186. San Francisco Station

== First journeys ==
=== Westbound ===
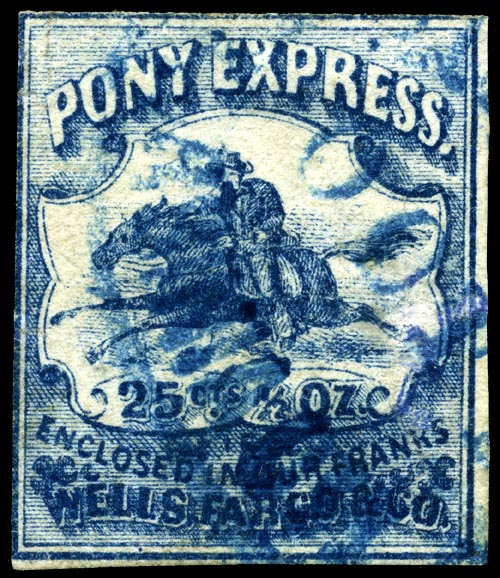
This 25-cent stamp printed by Wells Fargo was canceled in Virginia City, Nevada, and used on a revived Pony Express run between there and Sacramento beginning in 1862.

The first westbound Pony Express trip left St. Joseph on April 3, 1860, and arrived 10 days later in Sacramento, California, on April 14. These letters were sent under cover from the east to St. Joseph, and never directly entered the U.S. mail system. Today, only a single letter is known to exist from the inaugural westbound trip from St. Joseph to Sacramento. It was delivered in an envelope embossed with postage (depicted below) that was first issued by the U.S. Post Office in 1855.

The messenger delivering the mochila from New York and Washington, DC, missed a connection in Detroit and arrived in Hannibal, Missouri, two hours late. The railroad cleared the track and dispatched a special locomotive called Missouri with a one-car train to make the 206-mile (332 km) trek across Missouri in a record 4 hours and 51 minutes, an average of 40 miles per hour (64 km/h). It arrived at Olive and 8th Street, a few blocks from the company's new headquarters in a hotel at Patee House at 12th and Penn Street, St. Joseph, and the company's nearby stables on Penn Street. The first pouch contained 49 letters, five private telegrams, and some papers for San Francisco and intermediate points.

St. Joseph Mayor M. Jeff Thompson, William H. Russell, and Alexander Majors gave speeches before the mochila was handed off. The ride began at about 7:15 pm. The St. Joseph Gazette was the only newspaper included in the bag.

The identity of the first rider has long been in dispute. The St. Joseph Weekly West (April 4, 1860) reported Johnson William Richardson was the first rider. Johnny Fry is credited in some sources as the rider. Nonetheless, the first westbound rider carried the pouch across the Missouri River ferry to Elwood, Kansas. The first horse-ridden leg of the Express was only about 1/2 mile (800 m) from the Express stables/railroad area to the Missouri River ferry at the foot of Jules Street. Reports indicated that horse and rider crossed the river. In later rides, the courier crossed the river without a horse and picked up his mount at a stable on the other side.

The first westbound mochila reached Sacramento, on April 14, at 1:00 am.

First Period Westbound: April 3, 1860 – July 30, 1860

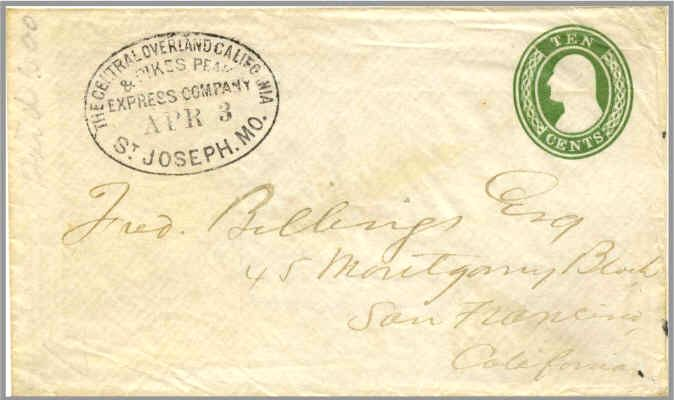
Letter carried on first westbound trip

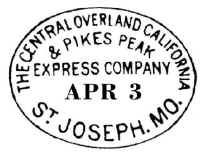
Postmark used on first westbound trip, April 3, 1860

=== Eastbound ===
The first eastbound Pony Express trip left Sacramento on April 3, 1860, and arrived at its destination 10 days later in St. Joseph, Missouri. From St. Joseph, letters were placed in the U.S. mails for delivery to eastern destinations. Only two letters are known to exist from the inaugural eastbound trip.

First Period Eastbound: April 3, 1860 – April 14, 1860

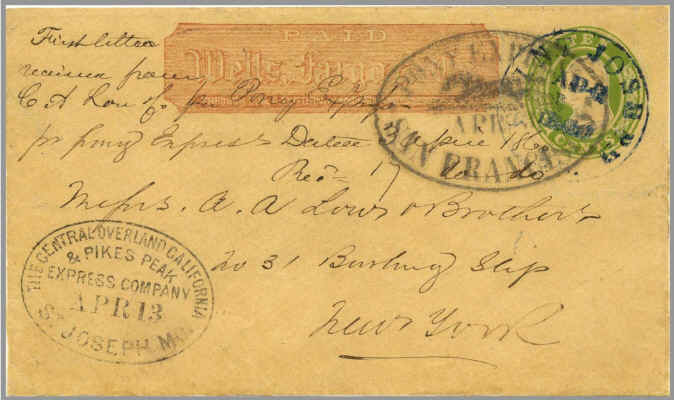
Letter carried on first eastbound trip

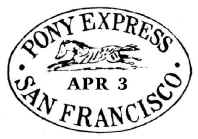
Postmark used on first eastbound cover

== Mail ==
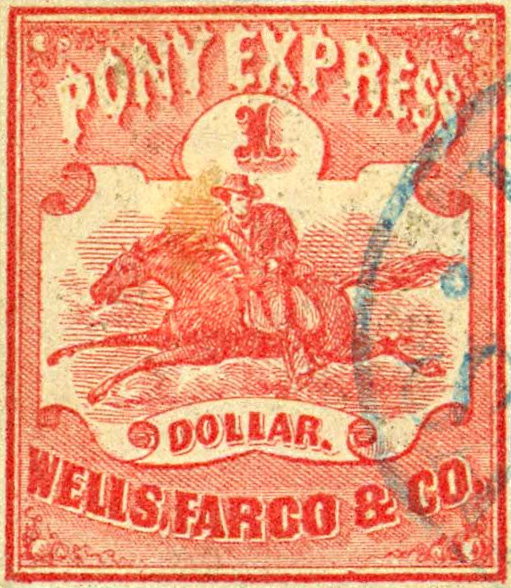
Pony Express Stamp, 1860

As the Pony Express mail service existed only briefly in 1860 and 1861, few examples of Pony Express mail survive. Contributing to the scarcity of Pony Express mail is that the cost to send a 1/2-ounce (14 g) letter was $5.00 at the beginning (equivalent to $180 in 2025, or 2 1/2 days of semi-skilled labor). By the end of the Pony Express, the price had dropped to $1.00 per 1/2 ounce but even that was considered expensive to mail one letter. Only 250 known examples of Pony Express mail remain.

=== Postmarks ===
Various postmarks were added to the mail to be carried by the Pony Express at the point of departure.

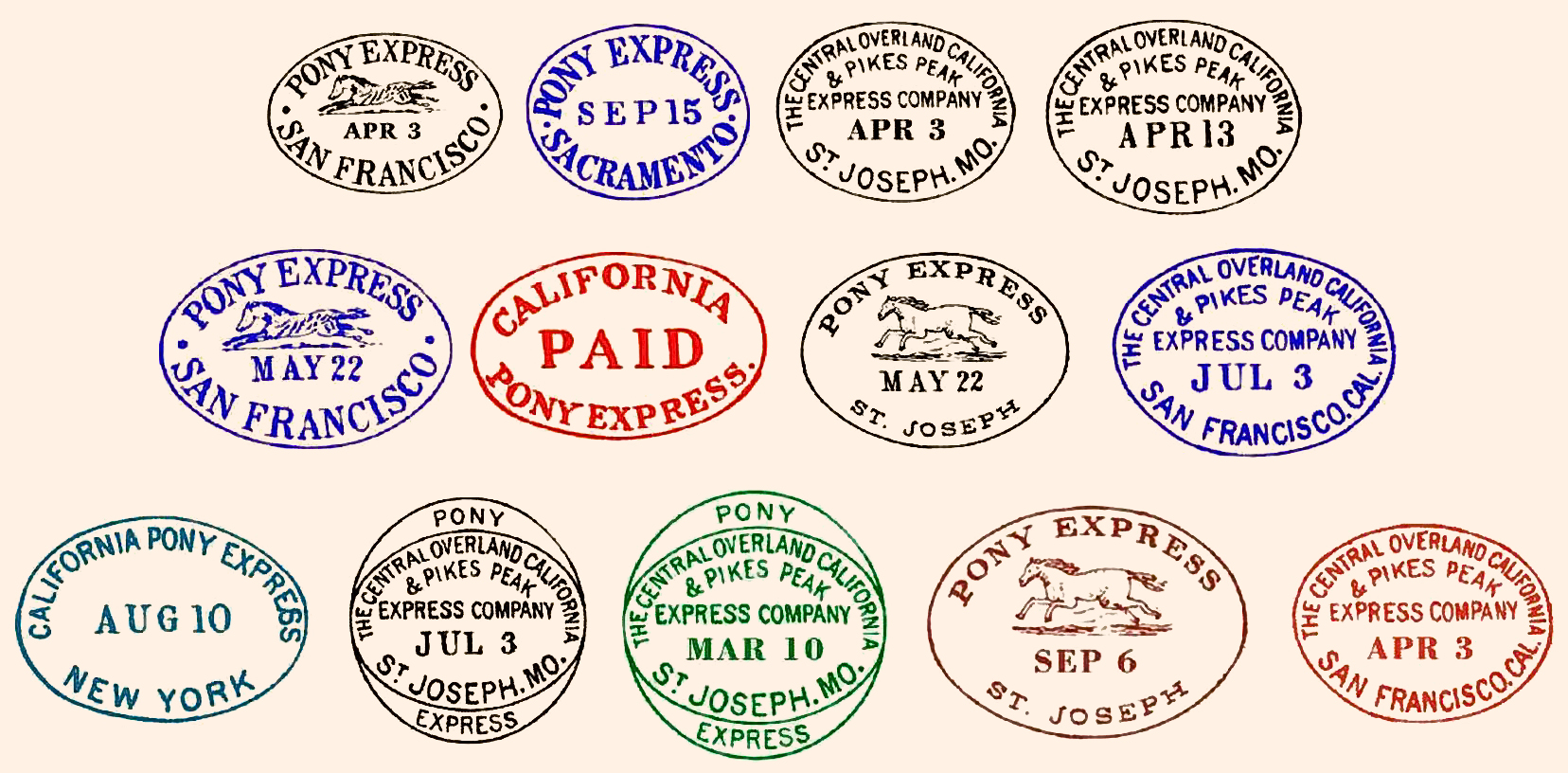
Postmarks on Pony Express mail

== Fastest mail service ==
William Russell, senior partner of Russell, Majors, and Waddell, and one of the biggest investors in the Pony Express, used the 1860 presidential election, of Abraham Lincoln, as a way to promote the Pony Express and how fast it could deliver the U.S. Mail. This was an important event because just four years earlier, in the prior election, it took months to get news of James Buchanan's win. The election of Lincoln was important because the newly-named president would have to take the country into the Civil War. Prior to the election, Russell hired extra riders to ensure that fresh riders and relay horses were available along the route. On November 7, 1860, a Pony Express rider departed Fort Kearny, Nebraska Territory (the end of the eastern telegraph line) with the election results. Riders briskly traversed the route, over snow-covered trails to Fort Churchill, Nevada Territory (the end of the western telegraph line). California's newspapers received word of Lincoln's election only 7 days and 17 hours after the East Coast papers, an "unrivaled feat at the time".

== Attacks ==
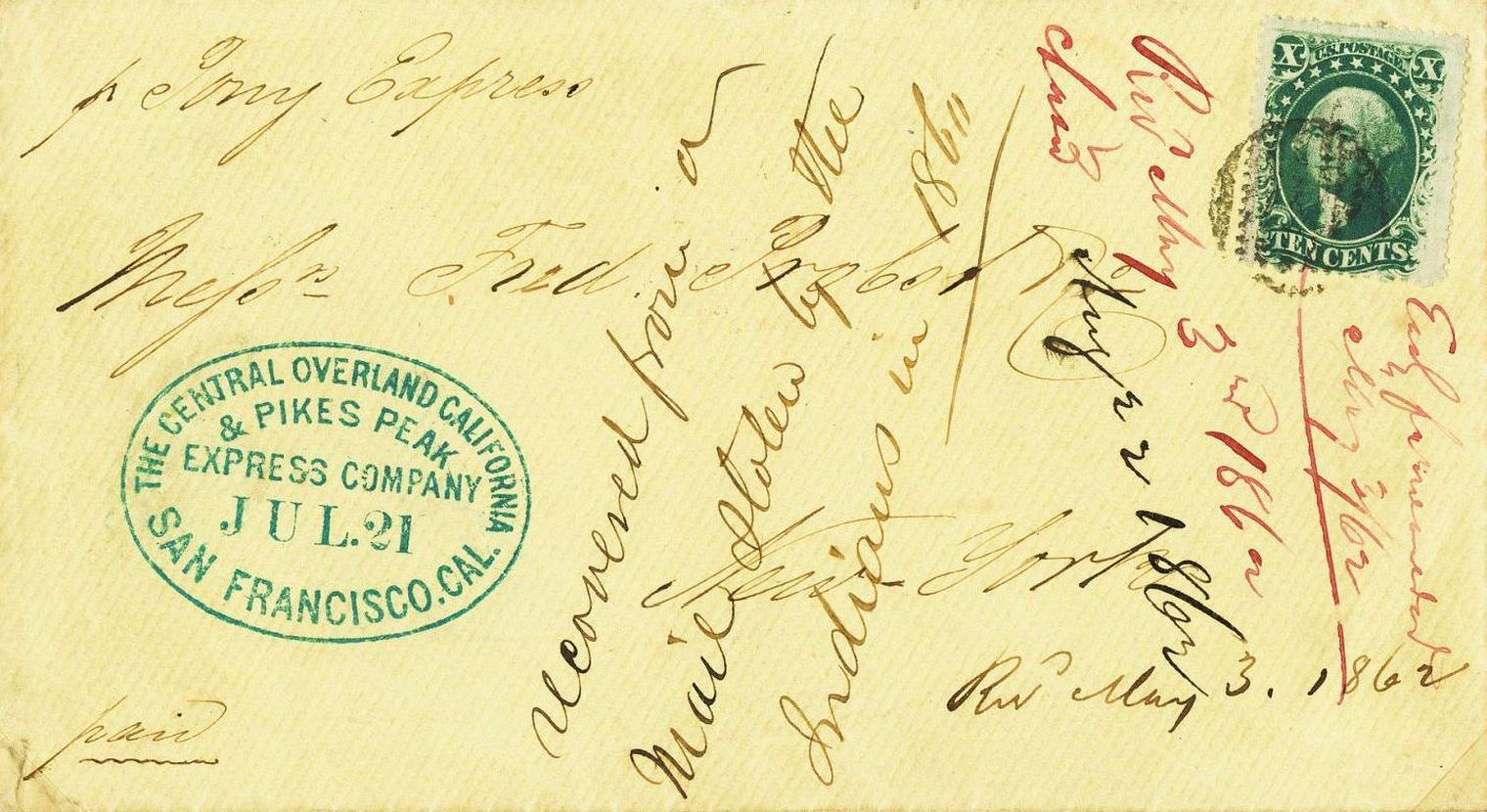
Stolen Pony Express mail. Notation on the cover reads "recovered from a mail stolen by the Indians in 1860" and bears a New York back stamp of May 3, 1862, the date when it was finally delivered in New York. The cover is also franked with the U.S. Postage issue of 1847, Washington, 10c black.

The Paiute War was a minor series of raids and ambushes initiated by American expansion into the territory of the Paiute Indian tribe in Nevada, which resulted in the disruption of mail services of the Pony Express. It took place from May through June 1860, though sporadic violence continued for a period afterward. In the brief history of the Pony Express, only once did the mail not go through. After completing eight weekly trips from both Sacramento and Saint Joseph, the Pony Express was forced to suspend mail services because of the outbreak of the Paiute Indian War in May 1860.

About 6,000 Paiutes in Nevada had suffered during a winter of fierce blizzards that year. By spring, the whole tribe was ready to embark on a war, except for the Paiute chief named Numaga. For three days, Numaga fasted and argued for peace. Meanwhile, a raiding party attacked Williams Station, a Pony Express station located on the then Carson River under present-day Lahontan Reservoir, not to be confused with the large endorheic Pleistocene lake of the same name (Lake Lahontan). One account says the raid was a deliberate attempt to provoke war. Another says the raiders had heard that men at the station had kidnapped two Paiute women, and fighting broke out when they went to investigate and free the women. Either way, the war party killed five men and the station was burned.

During the following weeks, other isolated incidents occurred when whites in the Paiute country were ambushed and killed. The Pony Express was a special target. Seven other express stations were also attacked; 16 employees were killed, and around 150 express horses were either stolen or driven off. Those who worked at the stations had no one around, possibly for miles, to help defend against the attacks, making working at the stations one of the deadliest jobs in the whole operation. The Paiute War cost the Pony Express company about $75,000 ($2.69 million in 2025) in livestock and station equipment, not to mention the loss of life. In June of that year, the Paiute uprising had been ended through the intervention of U.S. troops, after which four delayed mail shipments from the East were finally brought to San Francisco on June 25, 1860.

During this brief war, one Pony Express mailing, which left San Francisco on July 21, 1860, did not immediately reach its destination. That mail pouch (mochila) did not reach St. Joseph and subsequently New York until almost two years later.

== Famous riders ==
In 1860, riding for the Pony Express was difficult work – riders had to be tough and lightweight. An advertisement allegedly read, "Wanted: Young, skinny, wiry fellows not over eighteen. Must be expert riders, willing to risk death daily. Orphans preferred," but one historian, Joseph Nardone, claims that it is a hoax (dating no earlier than 1902), as no one has found the ad in contemporary newspaper archives.

The Pony Express had an estimated 80 riders traveling east or west along the route at any given time. In addition, about 400 other employees were used, including station keepers, stock tenders, and route superintendents. Many young men applied; Waddell and Majors could have easily hired riders at low rates, but instead offered $100 a month – a handsome sum for that time. Author Mark Twain described the riders in his travel memoir Roughing It as: "... usually a little bit of a man". Though the riders were small, lightweight, generally teenaged boys, they came to be seen as heroes of the American West. There was no systematic list of riders kept by the company, but a partial list has been compiled by Raymond and Nancy Settle in their Saddles & Spurs (1972).

Wild Bill Hickok never worked as a rider and only worked as a stocktender for the Pony Express.

=== First riders ===
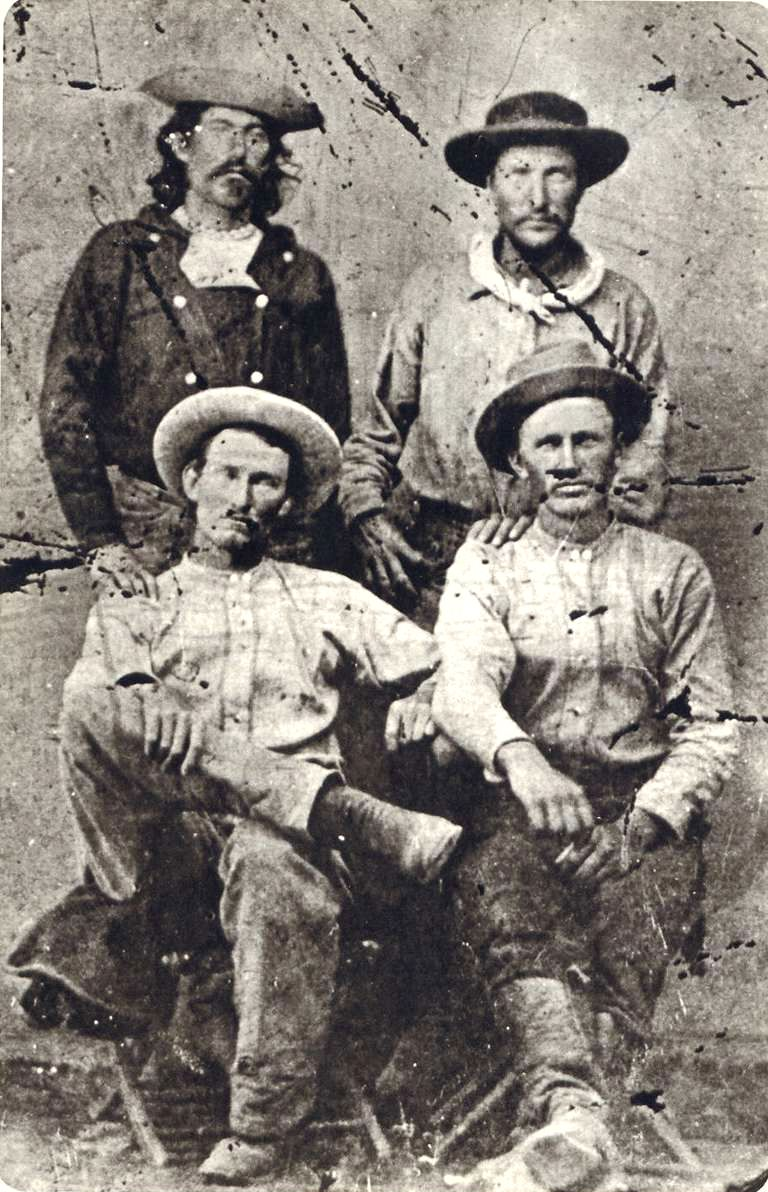
Pony Express riders: "Billy" Richardson, Johnny Fry, Charles Cliff, Gus Cliff

The identity of the first westbound rider to depart St. Joseph has been disputed, but currently most historians have narrowed it down to either Johnny Fry or Billy Richardson. Both Expressmen were hired at St. Joseph for A. E. Lewis' Division, which ran from St. Joseph to Seneca, Kansas, a distance of 80 miles (130 km). They covered at an average speed of 12 1/2 miles per hour (20 km/h), including all stops. Before the mail pouch was delivered to the first rider on April 3, 1860, time was taken out for ceremonies and several speeches. First, Mayor M. Jeff Thompson gave a brief speech on the significance of the event for St. Joseph. Then William H. Russell and Alexander Majors addressed the gala crowd about how the Pony Express was just a "precursor" to the construction of a transcontinental railroad. At the conclusion of all the speeches, around 7:15 pm, Russell turned the mail pouch over to the first rider. A cannon fired, the large assembled crowd cheered, and the rider dashed to the landing at the foot of Jules Street, where the ferry boat Denver, under a full head of steam, alerted by the signal cannon, waited to carry the horse and rider across the Missouri River to Elwood, Kansas Territory. On April 9 at 6:45 pm, the first rider from the east reached Salt Lake City, Utah. Then, on April 12, the mail pouch reached Carson City, Nevada Territory, at 2:30 pm. The riders raced over the Sierra Nevada, through Placerville, California, and on to Sacramento. Around midnight on April 14, 1860, the first mail pouch was delivered by the Pony Express to San Francisco. With it was a letter of congratulations from President Buchanan to California Governor Downey along with other official government communications, newspapers from New York, Chicago, and St. Louis, and other important mail to banks and commercial houses in San Francisco. In all, 85 pieces of mail were delivered on this first trip.

James Randall is credited as "the first eastbound rider" from the San Francisco Alta telegraph office, since he was on the steamship Antelope to go to Sacramento. Mail for the Pony Express left San Francisco at 4:00 pm, carried by horse and rider to the waterfront, and then on by steamboat to Sacramento, where it was picked up by the Pony Express rider. At 2:45 am, William (Sam) Hamilton was the first Pony Express rider to begin the journey from Sacramento. He rode all the way to Sportsman Hall Station, where he gave his mochila filled with mail to Warren Upson. A California Registered Historical Landmark plaque at the site reads:

This was the site of Sportsman's Hall, also known as the Twelve-Mile House. The hotel was operated in the late 1850s and 1860s by John and James Blair. A stopping place for stages and teams of the Comstock, it became a relay station of the central overland Pony Express. Here, at 7:40 am, April 4, 1860, Pony rider William (Sam) Hamilton, riding in from Placerville, handed the Express mail to Warren Upson who, two minutes later, sped on his way eastward.

— Plaque at Sportsman Hall

=== William Cody ===
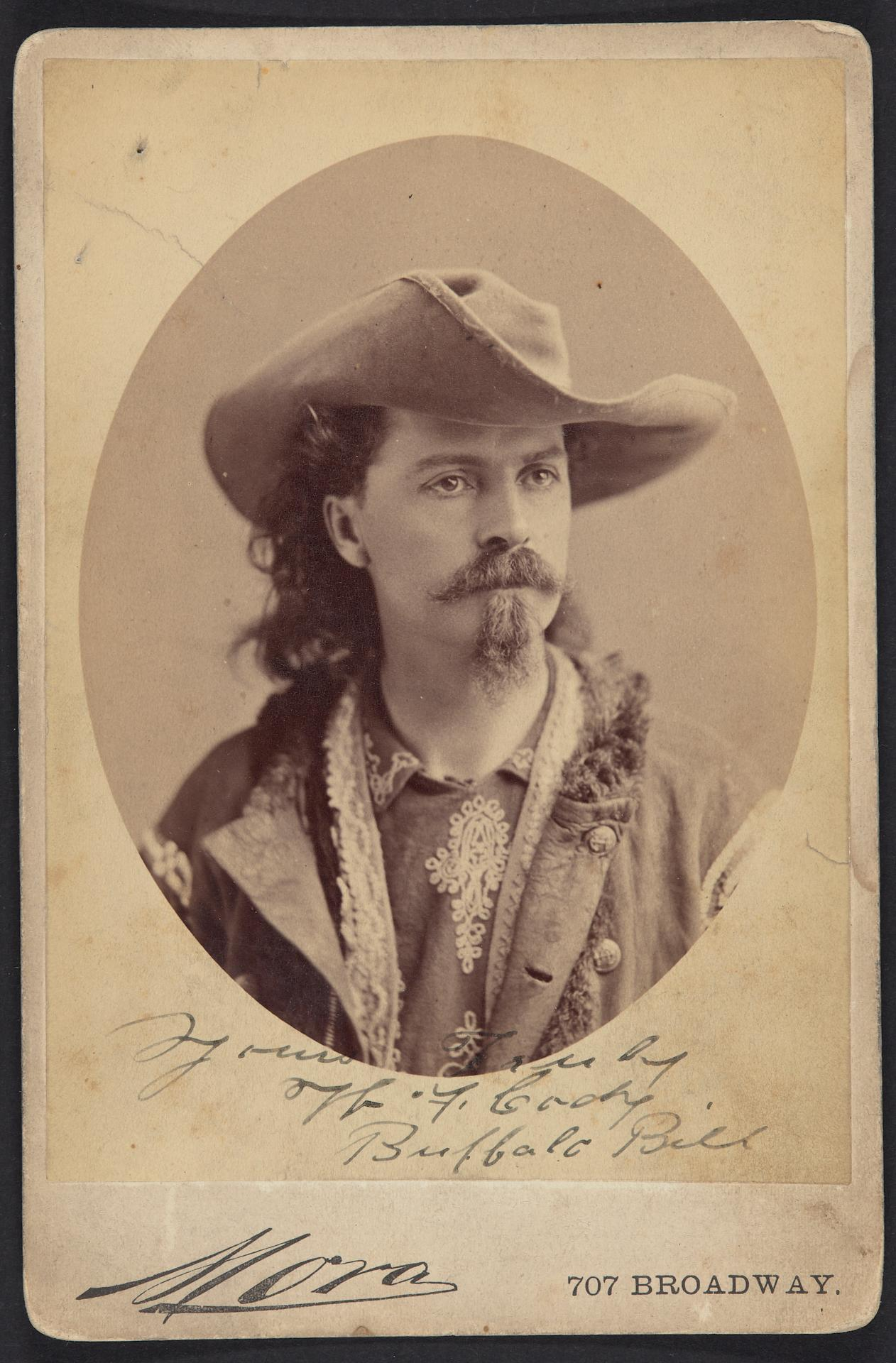
William "Buffalo Bill" Cody

Probably more than any other rider in the Pony Express, William Cody (better known as Buffalo Bill) epitomizes the legend and the folklore, be it fact or fiction, of the Pony Express. Numerous stories have been told of young Cody's adventures as a Pony Express rider, though his accounts may have been fabricated or exaggerated. At age 15, Cody was on his way west to California when he met Pony Express agents along the way and signed on with the company. Cody helped in the construction of several way-stations. Thereafter, he was employed as a rider and was given a short 45-mile (72 km) delivery run from the township of Julesburg, which lay to the west. After some months, he was transferred to Slade's Division in Wyoming, where he is said to have made the longest nonstop ride from Red Buttes Station to Rocky Ridge Station and back when he found that his relief rider had been killed. This trail of 322 miles (518 km) was completed in 21 hours and 40 minutes, and 21 horses were required. On one occasion when he is said to have carried mail, he unintentionally ran into an Indian war party, but managed to escape. Cody was present for many significant chapters in early western history, including the gold rush, the building of the railroads, and cattle herding on the Great Plains. A career as a scout for the Army under General Phillip Sheridan following the Civil War earned him his nickname and established his notoriety as a frontiersman.

=== Robert Haslam ===
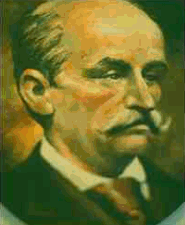
Robert "Pony Bob" Haslam in later years

"Pony Bob" Haslam was among the most brave, resourceful, and best-known riders of the Pony Express. He was born in January 1840 in London, United Kingdom, and came to the United States as a teenager. Haslam was hired by Bolivar Roberts, helped build the stations, and was given the mail run from Friday's Station at Lake Tahoe to Buckland's Station near Fort Churchill, 75 miles (121 km) to the east.

His greatest ride, 120 miles (190 km) in 8 hours and 20 minutes while wounded, was an important contribution to the fastest trip ever made by the Pony Express. The mail carried Lincoln's inaugural address. Indian problems in 1860 led to Haslam's record-breaking ride. He had received the eastbound mail (probably the May 10 mail from San Francisco) at Friday's Station. When he reached Buckland's Station, a few days after the death of Pony Express rider Bart Riles, his relief rider was so badly frightened over the Indian threat that he refused to take the mail. Haslam agreed to take the mail all the way to Smith's Creek for a total distance of 190 miles (310 km) without a rest. After a rest of 9 hours, he retraced his route with the westbound mail, where at Cold Springs, he found that Indians had raided the place, killing the station keeper and running off all of the stock. On the ride, he was shot through the jaw with an Indian arrow, losing three teeth. Finally, he reached Buckland's Station, making the 380-mile (610 km) round trip the longest on record.

Pony Bob continued to work as a rider for Wells Fargo and Company after the Civil War, scouted for the U.S. Army well into his 50s, and later accompanied his good friend "Buffalo Bill" Cody on a diplomatic mission to negotiate the surrender of Chief Sitting Bull in December 1890. He drifted in and out of public mention, but died in Chicago during the winter of 1912 (age 72) in deep poverty after suffering a stroke. Buffalo Bill paid for his friend's headstone at Mount Greenwood Cemetery (111 Street and Sacramento) on Chicago's far south side.

=== Jose Zowgaltz ===
Jose Zowgaltz (also recorded as Zowglat, Zowgalty, and Zogwalt) was an Hispanic pony express rider documented as killed by Paiute Indians. Zowgaltz was ambushed along Edwards Creek, as recorded by assistant station keeper J. G. Kelly in 1860.. He was one of three pony riders documented as killed by hostiles.

=== Bart Riles ===
Bart Riles was a shy Mexican teenager who had a vast knowledge of the Nevada desert, an experience that the Pony Express company wanted to capitalize on. Riles was assigned the Pony Express trail of relay stations heading east, starting from Fort Churchill (also known as Buckland's Station) and ending at Smith's Creek, a distance of about 117 miles one way. Moonlighting as a U.S. Army scout, he had just returned to Smith's Creek from army duty, when he was tasked to carry a mochila to Fort Churchill, which was his usual route, but in reverse. Moody writes that Riles was ambushed and wounded by rifle fire in the Shoshone mountains by a Paiute war party, though a contemporary source states that he was shot accidentally. Riles tied himself to his saddle, knowing his horse would follow the route to the Cold Spring relay station, which it did. While one Pony Express employee at the Cold Spring relay station comforted Riles until he died at dawn, the other delivered the mochila to its destination at Ft. Churchill 87 miles away.

=== Jack Keetley ===
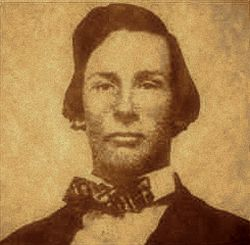
Jack Keetley

Jack Keetley was hired by A. E. Lewis for his division at the age of 19 and put on the run from Marysville to Big Sandy. He was one of those who rode for the Pony Express during the entire 19 months of its existence.

Jack Keetley's longest ride, upon which he doubled back for another rider, ended at Seneca, where he was taken from the saddle sound asleep. He had ridden 340 miles (550 km) in 31 hours without stopping to rest or eat. After the Pony Express was disbanded, Keetley went to Salt Lake City, where he engaged in mining. He died there on October 12, 1912, where he was also buried.

In 1907, Keetley wrote the following letter (excerpt):

Alex Carlyle was the first man to ride the Pony Express out of St. Joe. He was a nephew of the superintendent of the stage line to Denver, called the "Pike's Peak Express". The superintendent's name was Ben Ficklin. Carlyle was a consumptive, and could not stand the hardships, and retired after about two months' trial, and died within about six months after retiring. John Frye was the second rider, and I was the third, and Gus Cliff was the fourth.
I made the longest ride without a stop, only to change horses. It was said to be 300 miles and was done a few minutes inside of twenty-four hours. I do not vouch for the distance being correct, as I only have it from the division superintendent, A.E. Lewis, who said that the distance given was taken by his English roadometer which was attached to the front wheel of his buggy which he used to travel over his division with, and which was from St. Joe to Fort Kearney.

— Jack Keetley

=== Billy Tate ===
Billy Tate was a 14-year-old Pony Express rider who rode the express trail in Nevada near Ruby Valley. During the Paiute uprising of 1860, he was chased by a band of Paiute Indians on horseback and was forced to retreat into the hills behind some big rocks, where he killed seven of his assailants in a shoot-out before being killed himself. His body was found riddled with arrows, but was not scalped, a sign that the Paiutes honored their enemy.

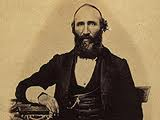
Photo of Major Howard Egan c. 1860s.

=== Major Howard Egan ===
Egan emigrated to the United States from Ireland with his parents in the early 1830s. While living in Massachusetts, he joined the Church of Jesus Christ of Latter Day Saints. He was with the pioneer party of 1847 that journeyed to the west to modern day Salt Lake City, Utah. At the start of the Pony Express, he was appointed Superintendent of the Division from Salt Lake City to Robert's Creek which is in present day Nevada. Egan filled in when others could not ride. After the Pony Express, he ranched and became involved with the court system in Utah.

== Horses ==
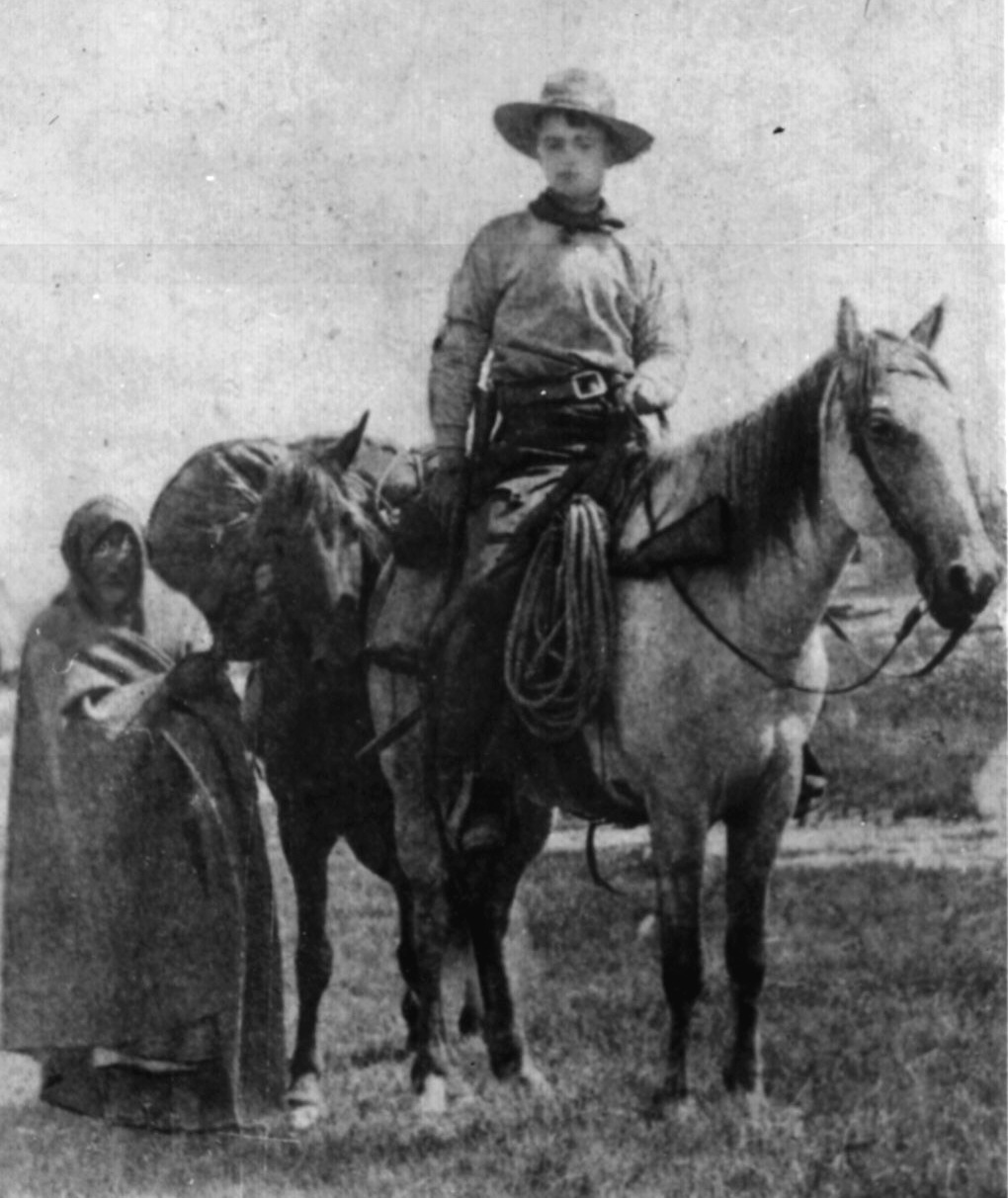
Frank E. Webner, Pony Express rider c. 1861

At the west end of the Pony Express route in California, W.W. Finney purchased 100 head of short-coupled stock called "California horses", while A.B. Miller purchased another 200 native ponies in and around the Great Salt Lake Valley. The horses were ridden quickly between stations, a distance of 10–20 miles (16–32 km). They were then relieved, and a fresh horse was exchanged for the one that just arrived from its strenuous run.

During his route of 80 to 100 miles (130 to 160 km), a Pony Express rider would change horses 8 to 10 times. The horses were ridden at a fast canter of around 10 to 15 miles per hour (16 to 24 km/h) and at times they were driven to full gallop at speeds up to 25 miles per hour (40 km/h). Horses of the Pony Express were purchased in Missouri, Iowa, California, and some western U.S. territories.

The types of horses ridden by riders of the Pony Express included Morgans and thoroughbreds, which were often used on the eastern end of the trail. Mustangs were often used on the western (more rugged) end of the mail route.

== Saddle ==
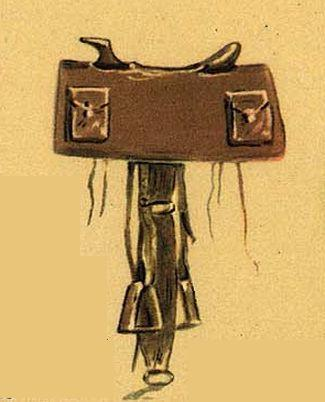
The Mochila: detail from Pony Express stations map by William Henry Jackson

In 1844, years before the Pony Express came to St. Joseph, Israel Landis opened a small saddle and harness shop there. His business expanded as the town grew, and when the Pony Express came to town, Landis was the ideal candidate to produce saddles for the newly founded Pony Express. Because Pony Express riders rode their horses at a quick pace over a distance of 10 miles (16 km) or more between stations, every consideration was made to reduce the overall weight the horse had to carry. To help reduce this load, special lightweight saddles were designed and crafted. Using less leather and fewer metallic and wood components, they fashioned a saddle that was similar in design to the regular stock saddle generally in use in the West at that time.

The mail pouch was a separate component to the saddle that made the Pony Express unique. Standard mail pouches for horses were never used because of their size and shape, as detaching and attaching it from one saddle to the other was time-consuming, causing undue delay in changing mounts. With many stops to make, the delayed time at each station would accumulate to appreciable proportions. To get around this difficulty, a mochila (a covering of leather) was thrown over the saddle. The saddle horn and cantle projected through holes that were specially cut to size in the mochila. Attached to the broad leather skirt of the mochila were four cantinas, or box-shaped hard leather compartments, where letters were carried on the journey.

== Closing ==
During its brief time in operation, the Pony Express delivered about 35,000 letters between St. Joseph and Sacramento. Although the Pony Express proved that the central/northern mail route was viable, Russell, Majors, and Waddell did not get the contract to deliver mail over the route. The contract was instead awarded to Jeremy Dehut in March 1861, who had taken over the southern, congressionally favored Butterfield Overland Mail Stage Line. The so-called "Stagecoach King", Ben Holladay, acquired the Russell, Majors, and Waddell stations for his stagecoaches.

Shortly after the contract was awarded, the start of the American Civil War caused the stage line to cease operation. From March 1861, the Pony Express ran mail only between Salt Lake City and Sacramento. The Pony Express announced its closure on October 26, 1861, two days after the transcontinental telegraph reached Salt Lake City and connected Omaha, Nebraska, and Sacramento. Other telegraph lines connected points along the line and other cities on the east and west coasts.

Despite the subsidy, the Pony Express was a financial failure. It grossed $90,000 and lost $200,000.

In 1866, after the Civil War was over, Holladay sold the Pony Express assets along with the remnants of the Butterfield Stage to Wells Fargo for $1.5 million.

== Legacy ==
=== Postage stamps ===
In 1869, the United States Post Office issued the first U.S. postage stamp to depict an actual historic event, and the subject chosen was the Pony Express. Until then, only the faces of George Washington, Benjamin Franklin, Thomas Jefferson, and Andrew Jackson were found on the face of U.S. postage. Sometimes mistaken for an actual stamp used by the Pony Express, the "Pony Express Stamp" issue was released in 1869 (8 years after the Pony Express service had ended) to honor the men who rode the long and sometimes dangerous journeys and to commemorate the service they provided for the nation. In 1940 and 1960, commemorative stamps were issued for the 80th and 100th anniversaries of the Pony Express, respectively.

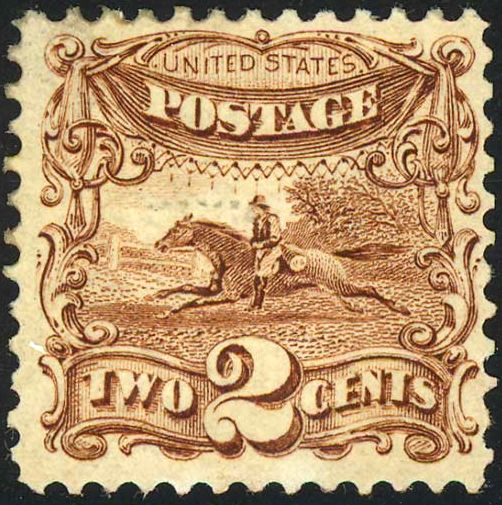
Pony Express Rider, issue of 1869

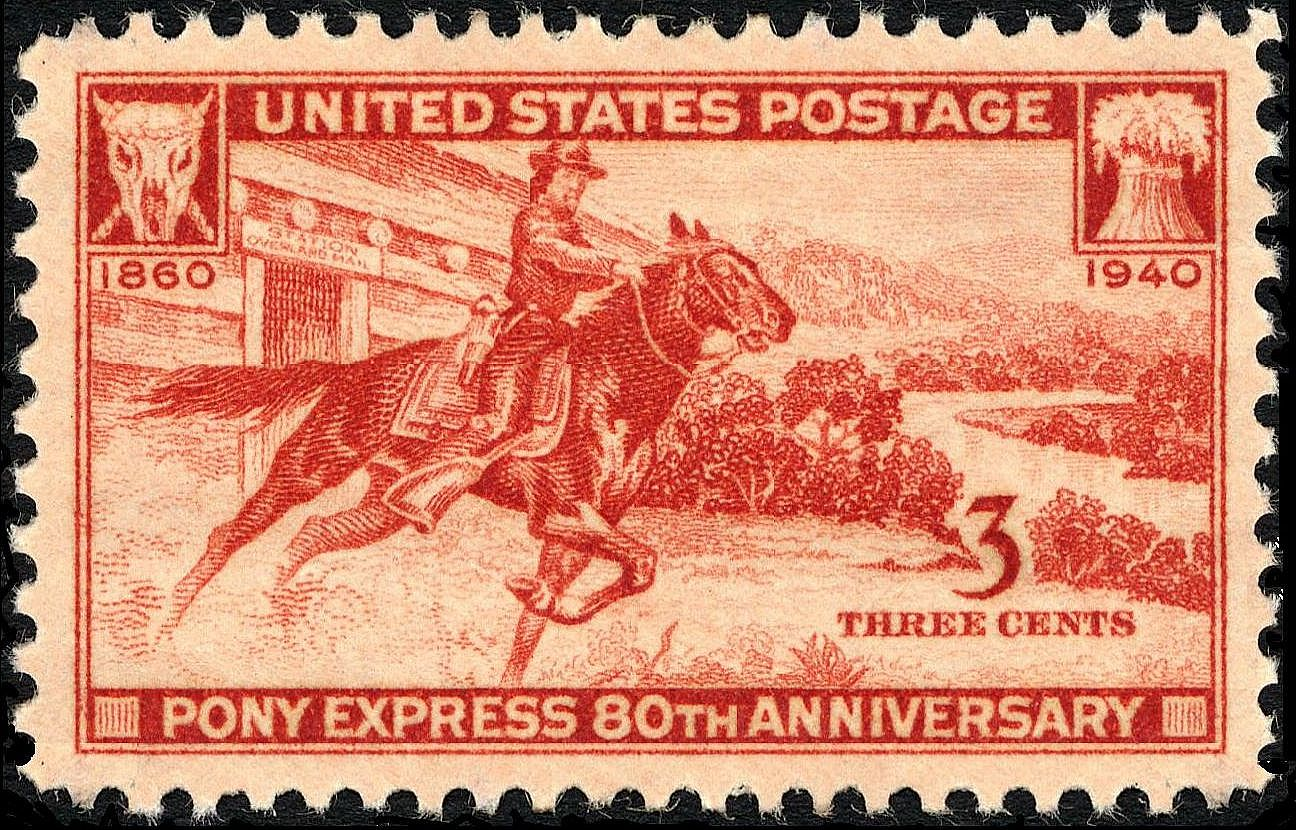
Pony Express 80th-anniversary issue of 1940

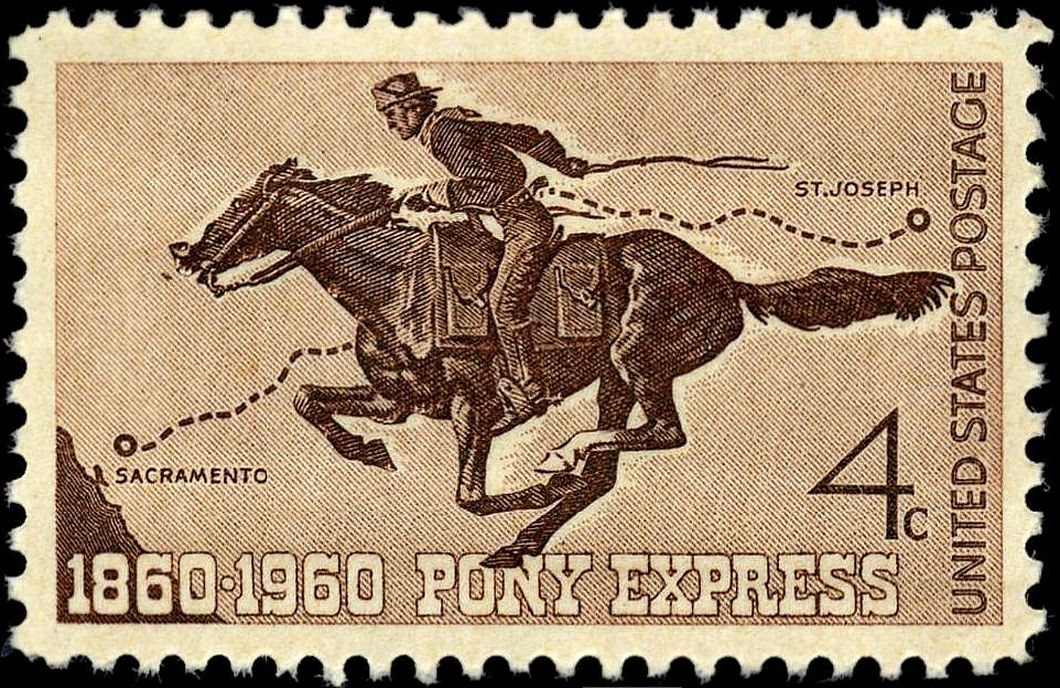
Pony Express 100th-anniversary issue of 1960

=== Historical research ===
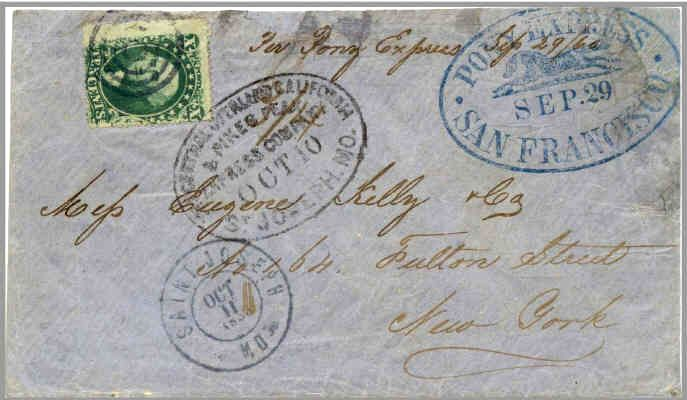
Mail from St. Joseph with a St. Joseph Pony Express postmark along with a city of destination postmark, San Francisco: The envelope also has an issue of 1855, Washington 10-cent postage affixed to it.

The foundation of accountable Pony Express history rests in the few tangible areas where records, papers, letters, and mailings have showed the most historical evidence. Until the 1950s, most of what was known about the short-lived Pony Express was the product of a few accounts, hearsay, and folklore, generally true in their overall aspects, but lacking in verification in many areas for those who wanted to explore the history surrounding the founders, the various riders, and station keepers, or who were interested in stations or forts along the Pony Express route.

The most complete books on the Pony Express are The Story of the Pony Express by Raymond and Mary Settle and Saddles and Spurs by Roy Bloss. Settle's account is unique, as he was the first writer and historical researcher to make use of Pony Express founder William B. Waddell's papers, now in a collection at the Huntington Library in San Marino, California. Mr. Settle wrote in the mid-1950s. Mr. Bloss was a writer for the Pony Express Centennial. While Settle's work was published generally without his annotations and notes, the writer's background here is unique and Settle does have an excellent bibliography. When Settle prepared to publish his well-researched account, he had a good volume of footnotes, citations prepared, but the editors chose not to use most of them. Instead, they opted for a less expensive approach to print and publish and released an accurate, but simplified account. Settle was not pleased with this new and sudden development, as he put much time and effort into the annotations. Yet, the account Settle wrote was and is a definitive one and is considered the best account on the history of the Pony Express among many historians.

=== National Historic Trail ===
Pony Express National Historic Trail
- Pony Express Trail Map
- Interactive map of Pony Express National Historic Trail
- Location: California, Colorado, Kansas, Missouri, Nebraska, Nevada, Utah, Wyoming, US
- Governing body: National Trails System
- Website: www.nps.gov/poex/index.htm

The Pony Express route was designated the Pony Express National Historic Trail August 3, 1992, by an act of Congress. Its route goes through eight states and includes substantial sections of land managed by the Bureau of Land Management in California, Colorado, Nevada, Utah, and Wyoming.

The public can auto-tour the route, visit interpretive sites and museums, and hike, bike, or horseback ride various trail segments. Sites open to public visitation along the trail include the Sand Mountain Recreation Area in Nevada; automobile access to a backcountry byway (the Pony Express Trail National Back Country Byway) along the route itself, Boyd Station and Simpson Springs Campground in Utah; and the Little Sandy Crossing in Wyoming. In total, approximately 120 historic sites along the trail may eventually be open to the public, including 50 stations or station ruins.

The National Pony Express Association is a nonprofit, volunteer-led historical organization. Its purpose is to preserve the original Pony Express trail and to continue the memory and importance of Pony Express in American history in partnership with the National Park Service, Pony Express Trail Association, and Oregon-California Trails Association.

=== Other commemorations ===
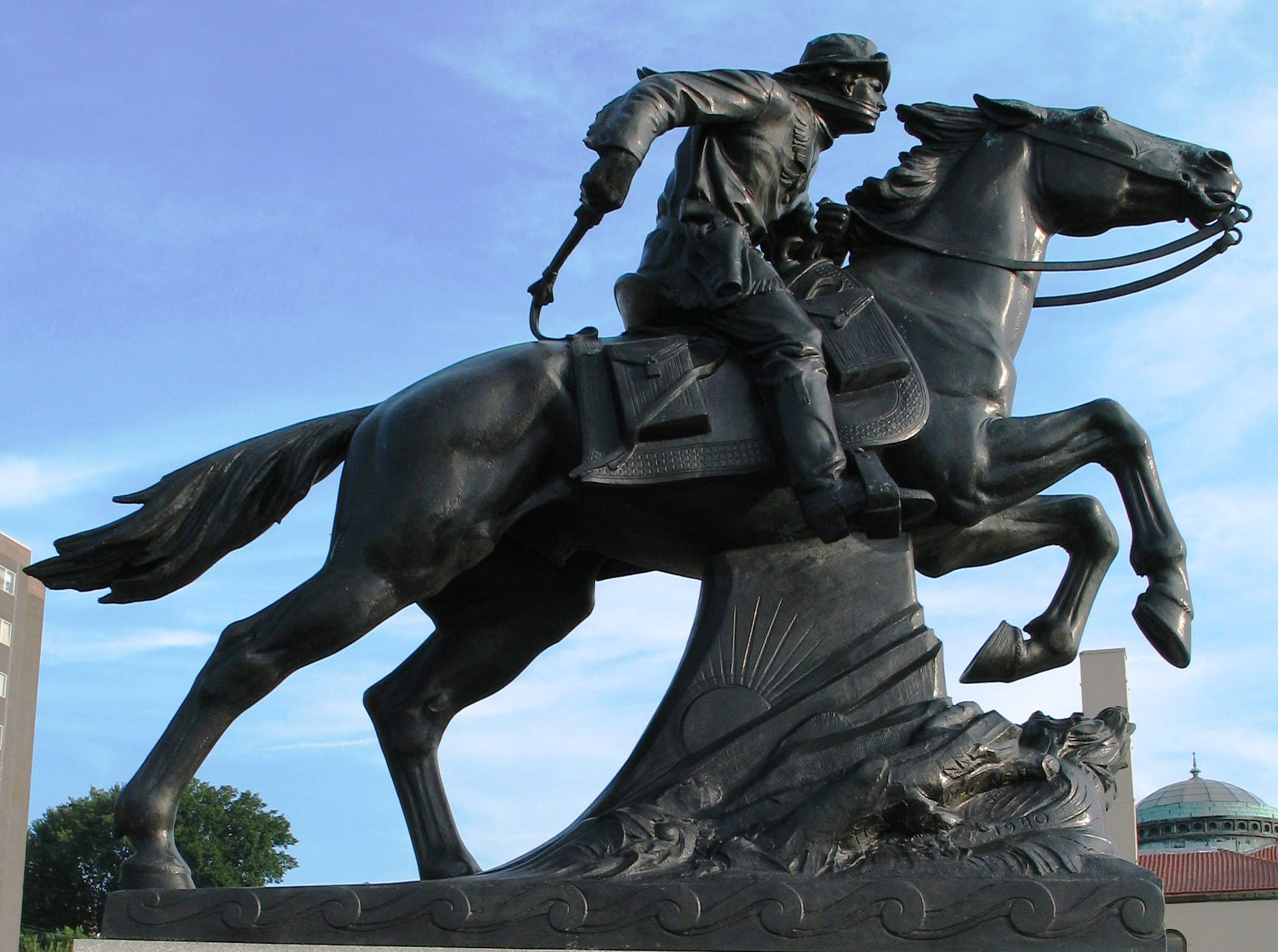
Pony Express statue in St. Joseph, Missouri

From 1866 until 1889, the Pony Express logo was used by stagecoach and freight company Wells Fargo, which provided secure mail service. Wells Fargo used the Pony Express logo for its guard and armored-car services. The logo continued to be used when other companies took over the security business into the 1990s. Since 2001, the Pony Express logo is no longer used for security businesses, since the business has been sold.

In June 2006, the United States Postal Service announced it had trademarked "Pony Express" along with "Air Mail".

April 3, 2010 was the Pony Express's 150th anniversary. Located in St. Joseph, Missouri, the Patee House Museum, which was the Pony Express's headquarters, hosted events celebrating the anniversary.

On April 14, 2015, Google released a playable doodle game celebrating their 155th anniversary.

== In popular culture ==
The continued remembrance and popularity of the Pony Express can be linked to Buffalo Bill Cody, his autobiographies, and his Wild West Show. The first book dedicated solely to the Pony Express was not published until 1900. However, in his first autobiography, published in 1879, Cody claims to have been an Express rider. While this claim has recently come under dispute, his show became the "primary keeper of the pony legend" when it premiered as a scene in the Wild West Show.

=== Film ===
- The Pony Express (1925)
- Winds of the Wasteland (1936)
- Frontier Pony Express (1939)
- Pony Express Days (short) (1940)
- Pony Post (1940)
- Saddle Silly (1941)
- Plainsman and the Lady (1946)
- Pony Express (1953)
- Last of the Pony Riders (1953)
- The Pony Express Rider (1976)
- Pony Express Rider (1996)
- Spirit of the Pony Express (2012)

=== Television ===
- The Range Rider (1951–1953) season-one episode "The Last of the Pony Express"
- Crossroad Avenger (1953)
- Pony Express (1959–1960)
- Bonanza (1959–1973) season seven, two-part episode "Ride the Wind"
- The Young Riders (1989–1992)
- Into the West (2005)
- My Little Pony: Equestria Girls (2013)
- Legends of the Pony Express (2024)

=== Comic books ===
- Lucky Luke #59: The Pony Express (1988)

=== Video Games ===
- An intergalactic mail delivery version of the Pony Express is central to the plot of the space-based horror game Mouthwashing, in which it is depicted as a soulless corporation, the last delivery service using human-piloted spaceships, sending its last crew on a year-long delivery mission before going bankrupt.

== See also ==
- Category:Pony Express stations
- Pony Express Museum
- Pony Express mochila
- Joseph Alfred Slade
- Postage stamps and postal history of the United States

Other routes

- Cursus publicus
- Örtöö
- Royal Road

== Bibliography ==
- Angel, Myron, ed. (1881). History of Nevada. Oakland, California: Thompson and West.
- Beasley, Delilah Leontium (1919). The Negro trail blazers of California. Times Mirror Printing and Binding House.
- Bradley, Glenn Danford (1913). The story of the Pony Express. A. C. McClurg & Co.
- Chapman, Arthur (1971). The pony express: the record of a romantic adventure in business. G. P. Putnam's Sons. ISBN 978-0-8154-0391-3.
- "Pony Express". Century Magazine. XXXIV. New York. 1898.
- Cody, William F. & Visscher, William Lightfoot (1917). Life and Adventures of 'Buffalo Bill' Colonel William F. Cody. Stanton and Van Vliet.
- Corbett, Christopher (2003). Orphans Preferred: The Twisted Truth and Lasting Legend of the Pony Express. New York: Broadway Books. ISBN 978-0-7679-0692-0.
- Egan, Ferol (1972). The Pony Express: The Record of a Romantic Adventure in Business. University of Nevada Press. p. 316. ISBN 0-87417-097-4.
- Frajola, Richard C.; Kramer, George J. & Walske, Steven C. (2005). The Pony Express, A Postal History (PDF). The Philatelic Foundation. ISBN 0-911989-03-X. Archived (PDF) from the original on October 10, 2022.
- Godfrey, Anthony (1994). "Pony Express National Historic Trail Historic Resource Study". National Park Service. Archived from the original on January 24, 2008.
- Majors, Alexander & Cody, William (1873). The Pony Express: Bringing Mail to the American West. The Western Miner and Financier. ISBN 978-1-60413-028-7.
- McNesse, Tim (2009). The Pony Express: Bringing Mail to the American West. Infobase Publishing. p. 138. ISBN 978-1-4381-1984-7.
- Michno, Gregory (2007). The Deadliest Indian War in the West: The Snake Conflict, 1864–1868. Caxton Press. p. 157. ISBN 978-0-87004-460-1.
- Moody, Ralph (1958). Riders of the Pony Express. Houghton Mifflin Company Boston.
- Peters, Arthur K. (1996). Seven Trails West. Abbeville Press. ISBN 1-55859-782-4.
- Reinfeld, Fred (1973). Pony Express. Macmillan / Bison Books. ISBN 978-0-8032-5786-3.
- Root, George A. & Hickman, Russell K. (February 1946). "Part IV-The Platte Route-Concluded. The Pony Express and Pacific Telegraph". Kansas Historical Quarterly. 14 (1): 36–92.
- Settle, Raymond & Settle, Mary (1949). Empire on Wheels. Stanford University Press. p. 153.
- Settle, Raymond & Settle, Mary (1955). Saddles and Spurs: The Pony Express Saga. Stackpole.
- Settle, Raymond & Settle, Mary (1972). Saddles and Spurs: The Pony Express Saga. Bison Books. ISBN 978-0-8032-5765-8.
- Thompson, Don (March 20, 2005). "Historian finds Pony Express ad". U-T San Diego. Associated Press. Archived from the original on March 13, 2012.
