= Patee House =

- U.S. National Register of Historic Places
- U.S. National Historic Landmark
- U.S. Historic district – Contributing property
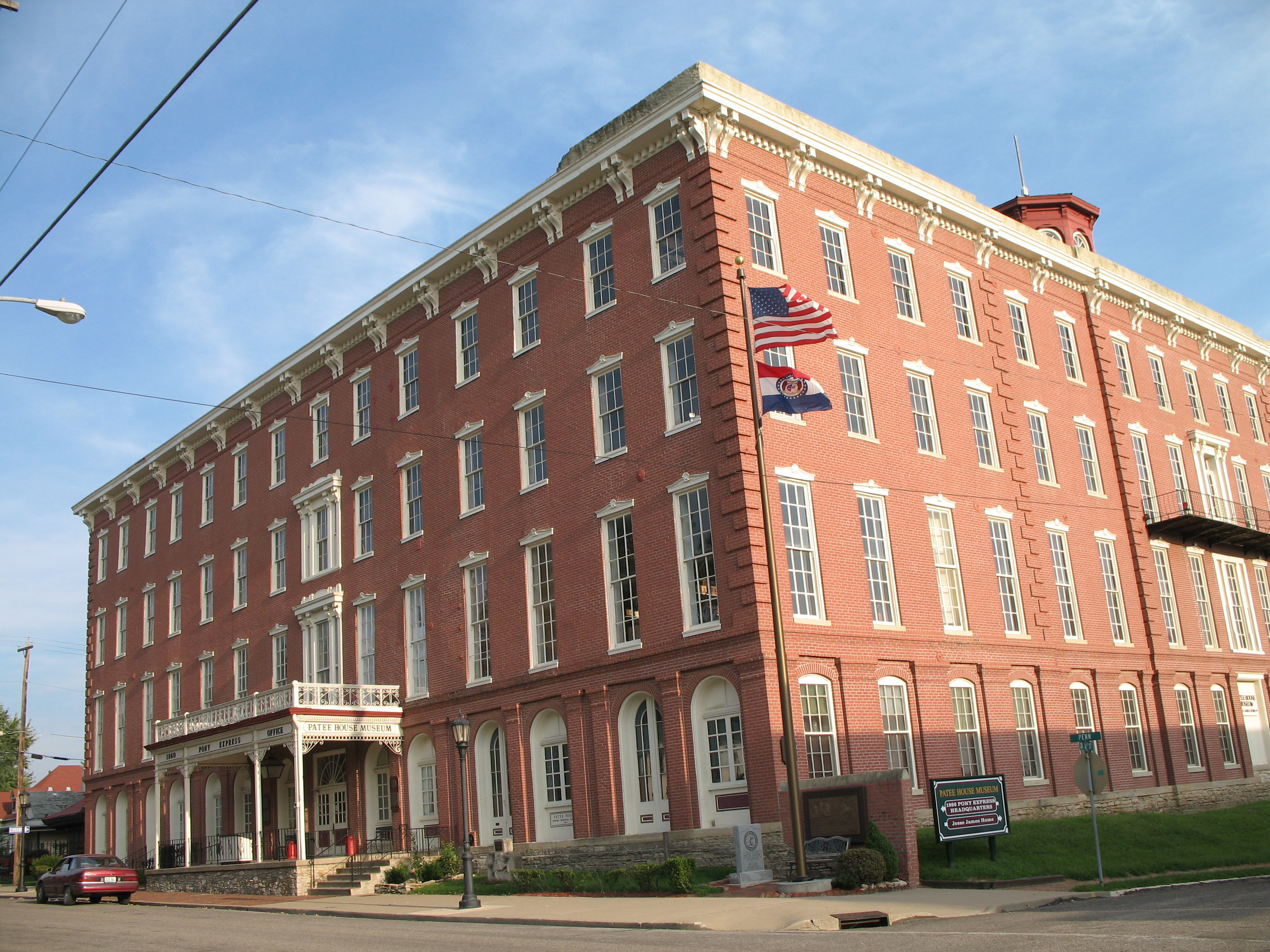

- Location within Missouri Location within the United States
- Location: 12th and Penn Sts., St. Joseph, Missouri
- Coordinates: 39°45′21.42″N 94°50′41.71″W
- Built: 1860
- NRHP reference No.: 66000414

Significant dates
- Added to NRHP: October 15, 1966
- Designated NHL: November 5, 1961

The Patee House, also known as Patee House Museum, was completed in 1858 as a 140-room luxury hotel at 12th Street and Penn in St. Joseph, Missouri. It was one of the best-known hotels west of the Mississippi River.

The Patee House was built by John Patée as part of his Patee Town development around the Hannibal and St. Joseph Railroad station. Office space included the headquarters and eastern terminus of the Pony Express, founded in 1860 to provide fast overland mail service to the West Coast. During the American Civil War, the Union Army Provost Marshal's office was located in Patee House. The Army conducted war trials in the second floor ballroom.

After the war, the Patee Female College operated in the building from 1865 to 1868. Its space was taken over 1875–1880 by the St. Joseph Female College, founded in affiliation with the Baptist Church. These private schools were part of the postwar expansion of educational facilities for young women across the country.

After outlaw Jesse James was killed in 1882 at his nearby home, his surviving family stayed at the hotel during the investigation of his death. It was then called World's Hotel. Also resident at the hotel within two weeks of James's death was Oscar Wilde who lectured in St. Joseph on April 18, 1882. Later the building was adapted to house the R.L. McDonald shirt factory and other light industrial uses for 80 years.

Since 1963, the building has been operated as a museum of United States history, with an emphasis on transportation. An 1892 Hannibal and St. Joseph Railroad steam locomotive and 1877 railroad depot are displayed inside the building.

In 2008 the museum was selected as one of America's Top Ten Western Museums by True West Magazine. It was also listed in 1,000 Places to See in the USA and Canada Before You Die.

The building was designated a National Historic Landmark for its role as the Pony Express headquarters. It marks the eastern terminus of the Pony Express National Historic Trail. The Jesse James Home Museum is located on Patee House grounds. Both are owned and operated by the Pony Express Historical Association, a not-for-profit organization. Both are contributing resources to the Patee Town Historic District.

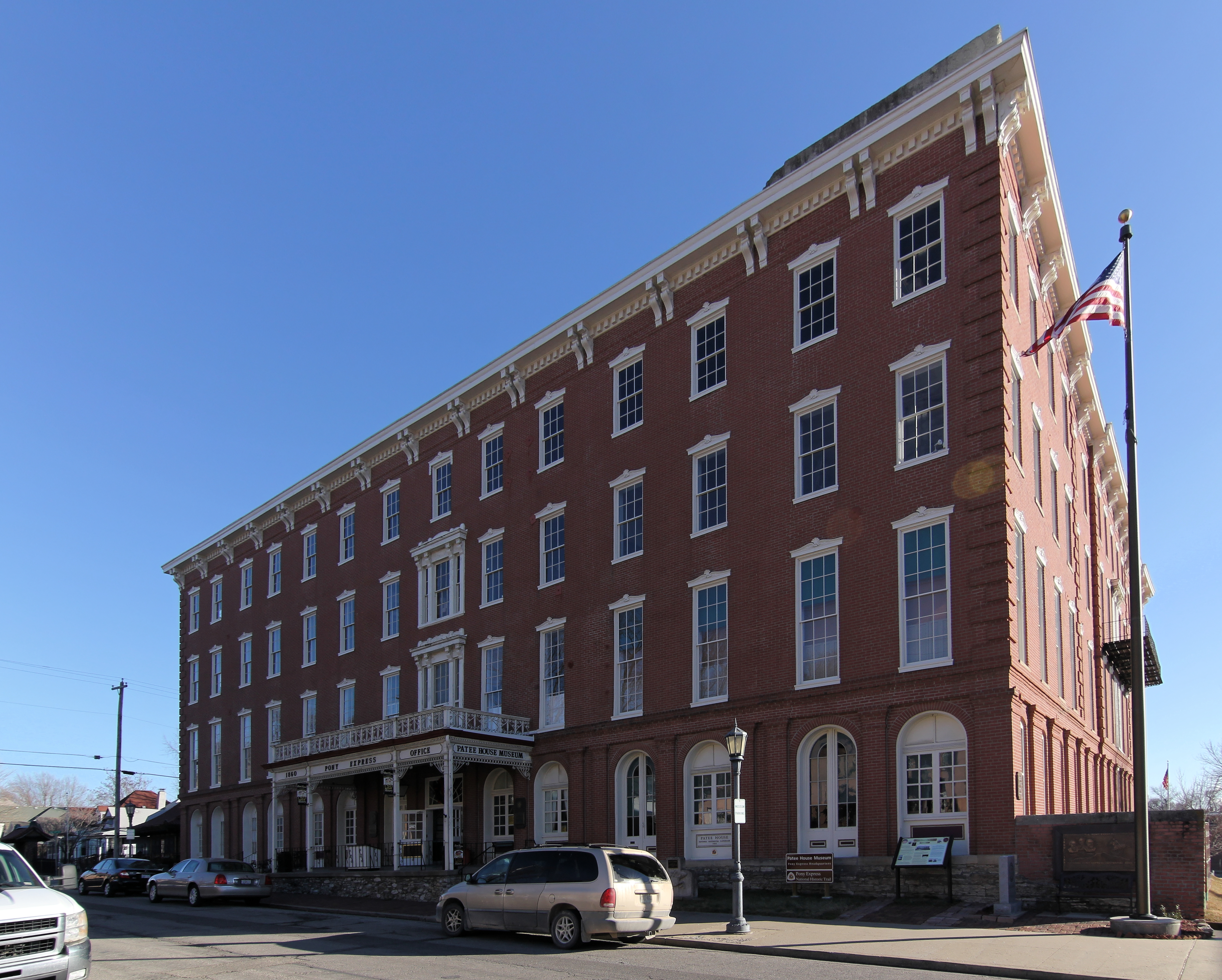
Patee House Museum, Saint Joseph, MO

== See also ==
- List of National Historic Landmarks in Missouri
- National Register of Historic Places listings in Buchanan County, Missouri
