= National Register of Historic Places listings in Buchanan County, Missouri =

Location of Buchanan County in Missouri

This is a list of the National Register of Historic Places listings in Buchanan County, Missouri.

This is intended to be a complete list of the properties and districts on the National Register of Historic Places in Buchanan County, Missouri, United States. Latitude and longitude coordinates are provided for many National Register properties and districts; these locations may be seen together in a map.

There are 61 properties and districts listed on the National Register in the county, including 1 National Historic Landmark.

This National Park Service list is complete through NPS recent listings posted October 30, 2026.

== Current listings ==
	Name on the Register	Image	Date listed	Location	City or town	Description
1	The Benton Club of St. Joseph	The Benton Club of St. Joseph	October 2, 2017 (#100001687)	402 N. 7th St. 39°46′09″N 94°51′07″W	St. Joseph	
2	Buchanan County Courthouse	Buchanan County Courthouse	August 21, 1972 (#72001563)	Courthouse Sq. 39°46′05″N 94°51′20″W	St. Joseph	Originally listed as both courthouse and jail, but jail removed in a 1978 boundary decrease
3	Buchanan County Infirmary	Buchanan County Infirmary	January 29, 2009 (#08001386)	3500 N. Village Dr. 39°49′02″N 94°48′41″W	St. Joseph	
4	Charles A. and Annie Buddy House	Charles A. and Annie Buddy House	May 14, 2004 (#04000427)	424 S. 9th St. 39°45′49″N 94°50′58″W	St. Joseph	
5	Burnside-Sandusky Gothic House	Burnside-Sandusky Gothic House	January 19, 2005 (#04001518)	720 S. 10th St. 39°45′39″N 94°50′53″W	St. Joseph	
6	Cathedral Hill Historic District	Cathedral Hill Historic District	June 15, 2000 (#00000691)	North 9th St., Powell St. and North 13th St. 39°46′22″N 94°50′48″W	St. Joseph	
7	Central-North Commercial Historic District	Central-North Commercial Historic District	March 8, 1991 (#91000125)	Roughly bounded by N. 4th, Main, Francis and Robidoux Sts. 39°46′04″N 94°51′20″W	St. Joseph	
8	Central Police Station	Central Police Station	November 6, 2009 (#09000887)	701 Messanie St. 39°45′45″N 94°51′07″W	St. Joseph	
9	Century Apartments	Century Apartments	July 5, 2001 (#01000712)	627 N. 25th St. 39°46′16″N 94°49′47″W	St. Joseph	
10	Christian Sachau Saloon	Christian Sachau Saloon	October 25, 1985 (#85003358)	1615 Frederick Ave. 39°46′21″N 94°50′26″W	St. Joseph	
11	City Hose Company No. 9	City Hose Company No. 9	October 25, 1985 (#85003357)	2217 Frederick Ave. 39°46′32″N 94°50′00″W	St. Joseph	
12	Corby-Forsee Building	Corby-Forsee Building	March 27, 1980 (#80002317)	5th and Felix Sts. 39°45′59″N 94°51′15″W	St. Joseph	
13	Dewey Avenue-West Rosine Historic District	Dewey Avenue-West Rosine Historic District	August 1, 2002 (#02000816)	Roughly bound by Prospect Ave., Auguste St., Dewey Avenue and West Rosine St. 39°46′42″N 94°51′39″W	St. Joseph	
14	Edmond Jacques Eckel House		January 31, 1980 (#80002318)	515 N. 4th St. 39°46′10″N 94°51′18″W	St. Joseph	Demolished
15	Everett School	Everett School	September 15, 2005 (#05001023)	826 S 14th St. 39°45′34″N 94°50′37″W	St. Joseph	
16	Enoch Madison Fenton House		April 12, 1982 (#82003126)	Southeast of Rushville; 39°35′41″N 94°58′30″W	Rushville	Demolished.
17	Dr. Jacob Geiger House-Maud Wyeth Painter House	Dr. Jacob Geiger House-Maud Wyeth Painter House	March 12, 1986 (#86000826)	2501 Frederick Ave. 39°46′37″N 94°49′48″W	St. Joseph	
18	German-American Bank Building	German-American Bank Building	November 24, 1978 (#78001638)	624 Felix St. 39°45′59″N 94°51′07″W	St. Joseph	
19	Hall School	Hall School	January 31, 2017 (#100000607)	2509 Duncan St. 39°45′06″N 94°49′47″W	St. Joseph	
20	Hall Street Historic District	Hall Street Historic District	July 17, 1979 (#79001352)	Roughly bounded by Isadore, Corby, 6th and 9th Sts. 39°46′20″N 94°51′04″W	St. Joseph	
21	Harris Addition Historic District	Harris Addition Historic District	January 13, 2003 (#01000723)	Roughly bounded by 16th St, Dalton St., 22nd St. and Edmond St. 39°46′04″N 94°50′17″W	St. Joseph	
22	Alois Herbert Double House	Alois Herbert Double House	May 29, 2007 (#06000992)	620 S. 10th St. 39°45′50″N 94°50′54″W	St. Joseph	
23	Jesse James House	Jesse James House	September 4, 1980 (#80002319)	12th St. and Mitchell Ave. 39°45′20″N 94°50′43″W	St. Joseph	
24	Kelley and Browne Flats	Kelley and Browne Flats	August 3, 1989 (#89000991)	1208-1216 Frederick Ave. 39°46′12″N 94°50′41″W	St. Joseph	
25	Kemper Addition Historic District	Kemper Addition Historic District	September 20, 2002 (#01000721)	Portions of Clay, Union, Kemper and Bon Ton Sts. 39°46′19″N 94°50′11″W	St. Joseph	
26	King's Hill Archeological Site		April 16, 1969 (#69000091)	Western end of King Hill Dr. 39°43′08″N 94°51′33″W	St. Joseph	
27	Krug Park Place Historic District	Krug Park Place Historic District	August 1, 2002 (#02000817)	Roughly bounded by St. Joseph Ave., Myrtle St., Clark St., and Magnolia Ave. 39°47′30″N 94°50′47″W	St. Joseph	
28	Lawler Motor Company Building	Lawler Motor Company Building	January 8, 2009 (#08001285)	1224 Frederick Ave. 39°46′12″N 94°50′42″W	St. Joseph	
30	John Sublett Jr. and Caroline Ashton Logan House	John Sublett Jr. and Caroline Ashton Logan House	May 7, 2007 (#06000991)	1906 N. 22nd St. 39°47′10″N 94°50′05″W	St. Joseph	
31	Maple Grove	Maple Grove	October 16, 1974 (#74001070)	2100 N. 11th St. 39°47′05″N 94°50′46″W	St. Joseph	
32	McIntyre-Burri House	McIntyre-Burri House	December 23, 2005 (#05001435)	808 N. 24th St. 39°46′35″N 94°49′54″W	St. Joseph	
33	Isaac Miller House	Isaac Miller House	September 17, 1980 (#80002320)	3003 Ashland Ave. 39°47′46″N 94°49′04″W	St. Joseph	
34	Miller-Porter-Lacy House	Miller-Porter-Lacy House	September 9, 1982 (#82003127)	2912 Frederick Blvd. 39°46′34″N 94°49′14″W	St. Joseph	
35	Missouri Theater and Missouri Theater Building	Missouri Theater and Missouri Theater Building	October 11, 1979 (#79001353)	112-128 S. 8th St. and 713-721 Edmond St. 39°45′58″N 94°51′02″W	St. Joseph	
36	Missouri Valley Trust Company Historic District	Missouri Valley Trust Company Historic District	March 4, 1975 (#75001063)	Felix and 4th Sts. 39°46′00″N 94°51′21″W	St. Joseph	
37	Mount Mora Cemetery	Mount Mora Cemetery	July 19, 2006 (#06000626)	824 Mount Mora Rd. 39°46′39″N 94°50′31″W	St. Joseph	
38	Museum Hill Historic District	Museum Hill Historic District	March 8, 1991 (#91000112)	Roughly bounded by 9th, Francis, 12th, Jules, 15th and Messanie Sts.; also 321 and 323 N. 15th and 1510 Faraon St. 39°45′56″N 94°50′43″W	St. Joseph	Second set of addresses represents a boundary increase of August 5, 2009
39	Neely Elementary School	Neely Elementary School	June 23, 2014 (#14000328)	1909 S. 12th St. 39°44′57″N 94°50′43″W	St. Joseph	
40	Nelson-Pettis Farmsteads Historic District	Nelson-Pettis Farmsteads Historic District	May 11, 1995 (#95000587)	4401 Ajax Rd., 3412 Pettis Rd. 39°43′23″N 94°48′37″W	St. Joseph	
41	Patee Town Historic District	Patee Town Historic District	August 1, 2002 (#02000818)	Roughly bounded by Penn St., S. 11th St., Lafayette St. and S. 15th St. 39°45′33″N 94°50′36″W	St. Joseph	
42	John Patee House	John Patee House	October 15, 1966 (#66000414)	12th and Penn Sts. 39°45′21″N 94°50′42″W	St. Joseph	
43	Pleasant Ridge School	Pleasant Ridge School	May 2, 1985 (#85000941)	R.F.D. #4 (MO State Rte 371); 39°40′57″N 94°49′50″W	St. Joseph	Destroyed
44	Pony Express Stables	Pony Express Stables	April 3, 1970 (#70000322)	914 Penn St. 39°45′22″N 94°50′57″W	St. Joseph	Stables at the eastern terminus of the Pony Express
45	John D. Richardson Dry Goods Company	John D. Richardson Dry Goods Company	April 12, 1982 (#82003128)	300 N. 3rd St. 39°46′07″N 94°51′25″W	St. Joseph	
46	Robidoux Hill Historic District	Robidoux Hill Historic District	August 3, 1989 (#89000992)	Roughly bounded by Franklin St., Robidoux St., Fourth St., Louis St., and Fifth St. 39°46′19″N 94°51′17″W	St. Joseph	
47	Robidoux Row	Robidoux Row	March 7, 1973 (#73001037)	219-225 E. Poulin St. 39°46′29″N 94°51′27″W	St. Joseph	
48	Robidoux School	Robidoux School	August 11, 1983 (#83000973)	201 S. 10th St. 39°45′24″N 94°50′51″W	St. Joseph	
49	Ryan Block	Ryan Block	January 29, 2013 (#12001242)	1137-1141 Frederick Ave. 39°46′12″N 94°50′43″W	St. Joseph	
50	St. Joseph City Hall	St. Joseph City Hall	October 25, 1985 (#85003356)	Frederick Ave. at Eleventh St. 39°46′07″N 94°50′47″W	St. Joseph	
51	St. Joseph Park and Parkway System	St. Joseph Park and Parkway System	January 20, 1995 (#94001566)	Roughly, along Northwest, Northeast, Corby Grove, Southwest and A Pkwys. and Noyes Blvd. from Krug Park to Hyde Park; 39°45′04″N 94°50′25″W	St. Joseph	
52	St. Joseph Public Library	St. Joseph Public Library	September 20, 1982 (#82003129)	10th and Felix Sts. 39°46′00″N 94°50′53″W	St. Joseph	
53	St. Joseph Public Library-Carnegie Branch	St. Joseph Public Library-Carnegie Branch	May 20, 1999 (#99000595)	316 Massachusetts St. 39°42′58″N 94°51′58″W	St. Joseph	
54	St. Joseph's Commerce and Banking Historic District	St. Joseph's Commerce and Banking Historic District	July 5, 2001 (#01000709)	Roughly bounded by 3rd, 91t, Francis, and Edmonds St. 39°45′59″N 94°51′09″W	St. Joseph	
55	South Fourth Street Commercial Historic District	South Fourth Street Commercial Historic District	March 8, 1991 (#91000124)	Roughly bounded by S. 3rd, S. 5th, Charles and Messanie Sts. 39°45′50″N 94°51′22″W	St. Joseph	
56	Sugar Lake State Park Open Shelter	Sugar Lake State Park Open Shelter	February 28, 1985 (#85000522)	Off MO 138; 39°32′21″N 95°03′35″W	Rushville	A shelter at Sugar Lake, now Lewis and Clark State Park
57	Thompson-Brown-Sandusky House	Thompson-Brown-Sandusky House	February 10, 1983 (#83004297)	207 E. Cliff St. 39°42′33″N 94°51′36″W	St. Joseph	
58	Virginia Flats	Virginia Flats	May 21, 1992 (#92000586)	516-518 and 520-528 N. 10th St. 39°46′14″N 94°50′54″W	St. Joseph	
59	Vosteen-Hauck House		September 23, 1982 (#82003130)	913 N. 2nd St. 39°46′24″N 94°51′28″W	St. Joseph	Demolished
60	Western Tablet and Stationery Company, Building No. 2	Western Tablet and Stationery Company, Building No. 2	August 16, 2007 (#07000814)	1300 S 12th St. 39°45′24″N 94°50′45″W	St. Joseph	
61	Wholesale Row	Wholesale Row	September 19, 1977 (#77000800)	Bounded by Jules, 3rd, 4th, and Francis Sts. 39°46′04″N 94°51′23″W	St. Joseph	Noyes-Norman Bldg on 3rd St demolished, remaining 4 bldgs. along 3rd still extant
62	Wyeth Flats	Wyeth Flats	October 25, 1985 (#85003355)	1015-1031 Faraon St. 39°46′09″N 94°50′48″W	St. Joseph	

== Former listing ==
	Name on the Register	Image	Date listed	Date removed	Location	City or town	Description
1	Livestock Exchange Building	Livestock Exchange Building	April 20, 2004 (#04000342)	January 7, 2025	601 Illinois Ave. 39°43′14″N 94°52′10″W	St. Joseph	
2	Market Square Historic District		March 17, 1972 (#72001562)	January 1, 1999	Roughly bounded by Edmond, Felix and N. 3rd Sts., and Market Pl.	St. Joseph	All buildings demolished by 1973.

== See also ==
- List of National Historic Landmarks in Missouri
- National Register of Historic Places listings in Missouri
