= Cathedral Hill Historic District =

Cathedral Hill Historic District may refer to:

- Cathedral Hill Historic District (Baltimore, Maryland), listed on the National Register of Historic Places (NRHP) in Maryland
- Cathedral Hill Historic District (St. Joseph, Missouri), listed on the NRHP in Buchanan County, Missouri

== See also ==
- Cathedral Historic District (disambiguation)
- Cathedral Hill (disambiguation)
