= Everett School =

Everett School may refer to:

- Everett School (Sioux City, Iowa)
- Everett School (St. Joseph, Missouri)
