= Sandusky House =

Sandusky House may refer to:

in the United States (by state then city)

- Sandusky House (Carlisle, Kentucky), listed on the Bourbon County
- Burnside-Sandusky Gothic House, St. Joseph, Missouri, listed on the NRHP in Buchanan County
- Thompson-Brown-Sandusky House, St. Joseph, Missouri, listed on the NRHP in Buchanan County
- Sandusky County Jail and Sheriff's House, Fremont, Ohio, listed on the NRHP in Sandusky County
- Sandusky House (Lynchburg, Virginia), listed on the NRHP
