= Missouri Theater =

Missouri Theater or Missouri Theatre may refer to:

- Missouri Theater (St. Joseph, Missouri)
- Missouri Theatre (Columbia, Missouri)
