= Cathedral Hill =

Cathedral Hill may refer to:

- Cathedral Hill, San Francisco
- Cathedral Hill, Saint Paul
- Cathedral Hill, Frombork
- Cathedral Hill Historic District (Baltimore, Maryland), listed on the National Register of Historic Places (NRHP) in Maryland
- Cathedral Hill Historic District (St. Joseph, Missouri), listed on the NRHP in Buchanan County, Missouri
- Cathedral Hill, Lusaka
