= Market Square Historic District =

Market Square Historic District may refer to:

- West Market Square Historic District, Bangor, Maine, listed on the National Register of Historic Places (NRHP) in Penobscot County, Maine
- Market Square Historic District (Houlton, Maine), listed on the NRHP in Aroostook County, Maine
- Market Square Historic District (Newburyport, Massachusetts), NRHP-listed
- Market Square Historic District (Buffalo, New York), NRHP-listed
- Market Square (Miamisburg, Ohio), NRHP-listed
- Market Square Historic District (Pittsburgh, Pennsylvania), a Pittsburgh Landmark
- Market Square-Patten Parkway, Chattanooga, Tennessee, listed on the NRHP in Hamilton County, Tennessee
- Market Square Commercial Historic District, Knoxville, Tennessee
- Main Street Market Square Historic District, Houston, Texas, NRHP-listed
- Fredericksburg Town Hall and Market Square, Fredericksburg, Virginia
- Centre Market Square Historic District, Wheeling, West Virginia, listed on the NRHP in Ohio County, West Virginia
- Market Square Historic District (St. Joseph, Missouri)
