= Buchanan County Courthouse =

Buchanan County Courthouse may refer to:

- Buchanan County Courthouse (Iowa), Independence, Iowa
- Buchanan County Courthouse (Missouri), St. Joseph, Missouri
- Buchanan County Courthouse (Virginia), Grundy, Virginia
