= Museum Hill =

Museum Hill may refer to:

- Museum Hill Historic District in St. Joseph, Missouri
- An alternative, mostly obsolete, name for Mouseion Hill in Athens, Greece
- Museum Hill, a group of four museums in Santa Fe, New Mexico
- Museum hill, a location of Putnam Museum in Davenport, Iowa

== See also ==
- Hill Aerospace Museum
