= Pleasant Ridge School =

Former school in Buchanan County, Missouri, United States

- U.S. National Register of Historic Places
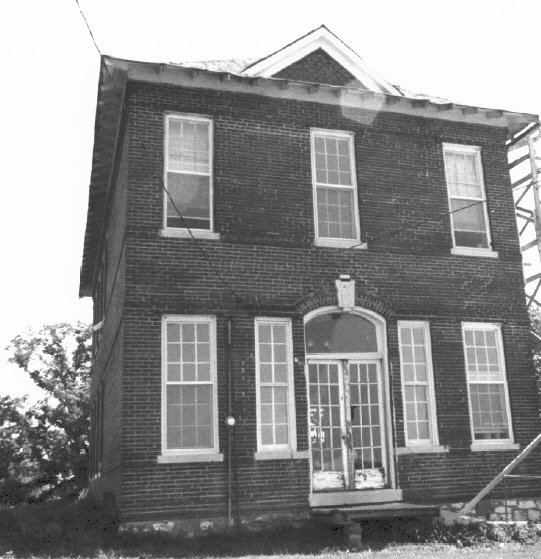

- Location within Missouri Location within the United States
- Location: R.F.D. #4 (MO State Rte 371), near St. Joseph, Missouri
- Coordinates: 39°40′57″N 94°49′50″W
- Area: 1 acre (0.40 ha)
- Built: 1883
- NRHP reference No.: 85000941
- Added to NRHP: May 2, 1985

Pleasant Ridge School was a historic school building in Buchanana County, Missouri, United States, south of St. Joseph.

== Description ==
The school was built in 1883, and was a two-story, rectangular brick building on a stone foundation. It had a low-pitched roof and segmental arched door opening.

It was listed on the National Register of Historic Places in 1985.

== See also ==
- National Register of Historic Places listings in Buchanan County, Missouri
