= Central-North Commercial Historic District =

Historic district in Missouri, United States

- U.S. National Register of Historic Places
- U.S. Historic district
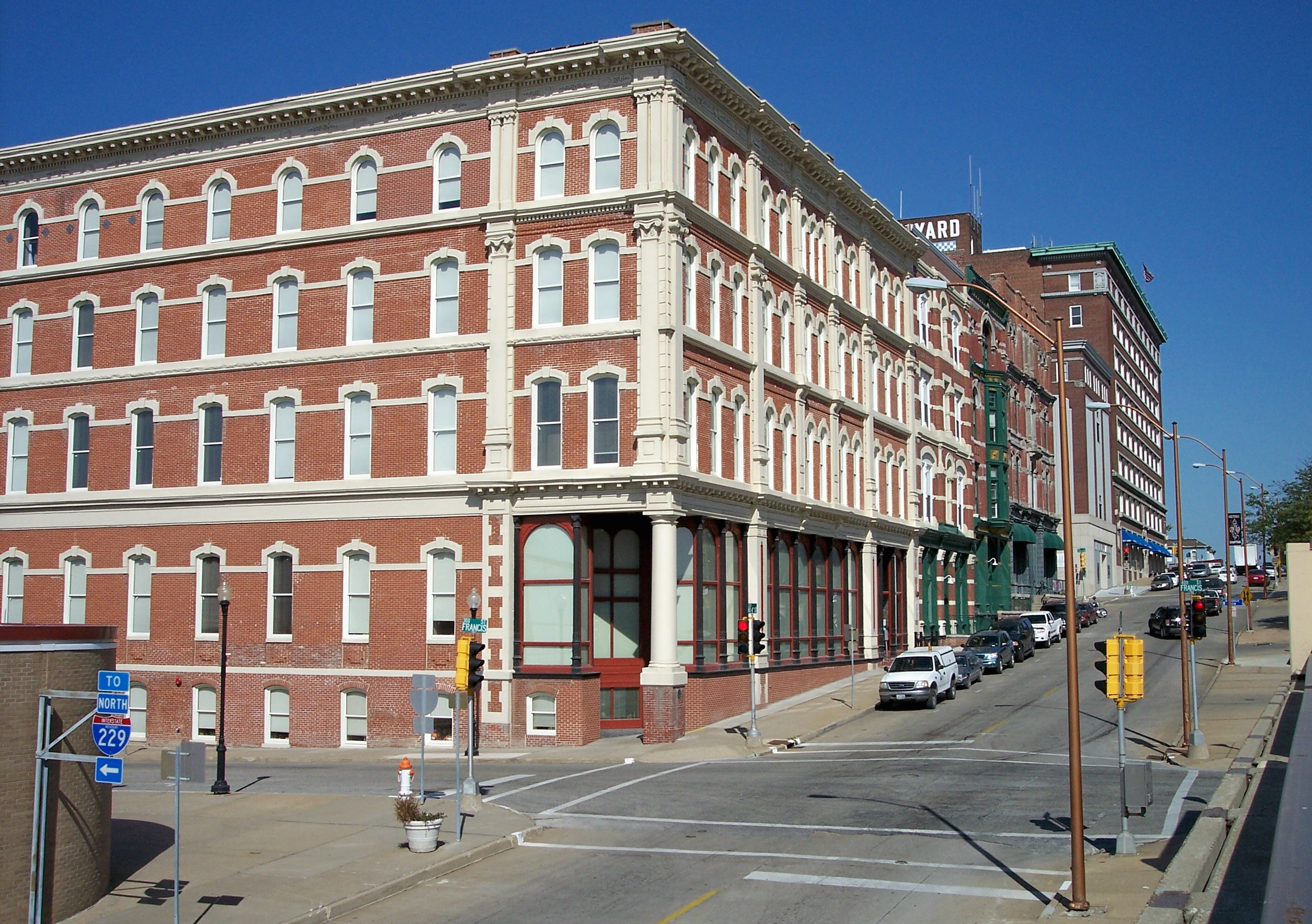

- Location within Missouri Location within the United States
- Location: Roughly bounded by N. 4th, Main, Francis and Robidoux Sts., St. Joseph, Missouri
- Coordinates: 39°46′04″N 94°51′20″W
- Area: 15 acres (6.1 ha)
- Architect: Eckel & Mann; Eckel, Edmund J.
- Architectural style: Classical Revival, Italianate
- MPS: St. Joseph MPS
- NRHP reference No.: 91000125
- Added to NRHP: March 8, 1991

Central-North Commercial Historic District is a national historic district located at St. Joseph, Missouri. The district encompasses 18 contributing buildings in an industrial / commercial section of St. Joseph west of the central business district. It developed between about 1885 and 1929, and includes representative examples of Italianate and Classical Revival style architecture. Located in the district is the separately listed John D. Richardson Dry Goods Company. Other notable buildings include a number of warehouse / light manufacturing facilities some of which were designed by the architectural firm of Eckel & Aldrich.

It was listed on the National Register of Historic Places in 1991.
