= Ryan Block (St. Joseph, Missouri) =

- U.S. National Register of Historic Places
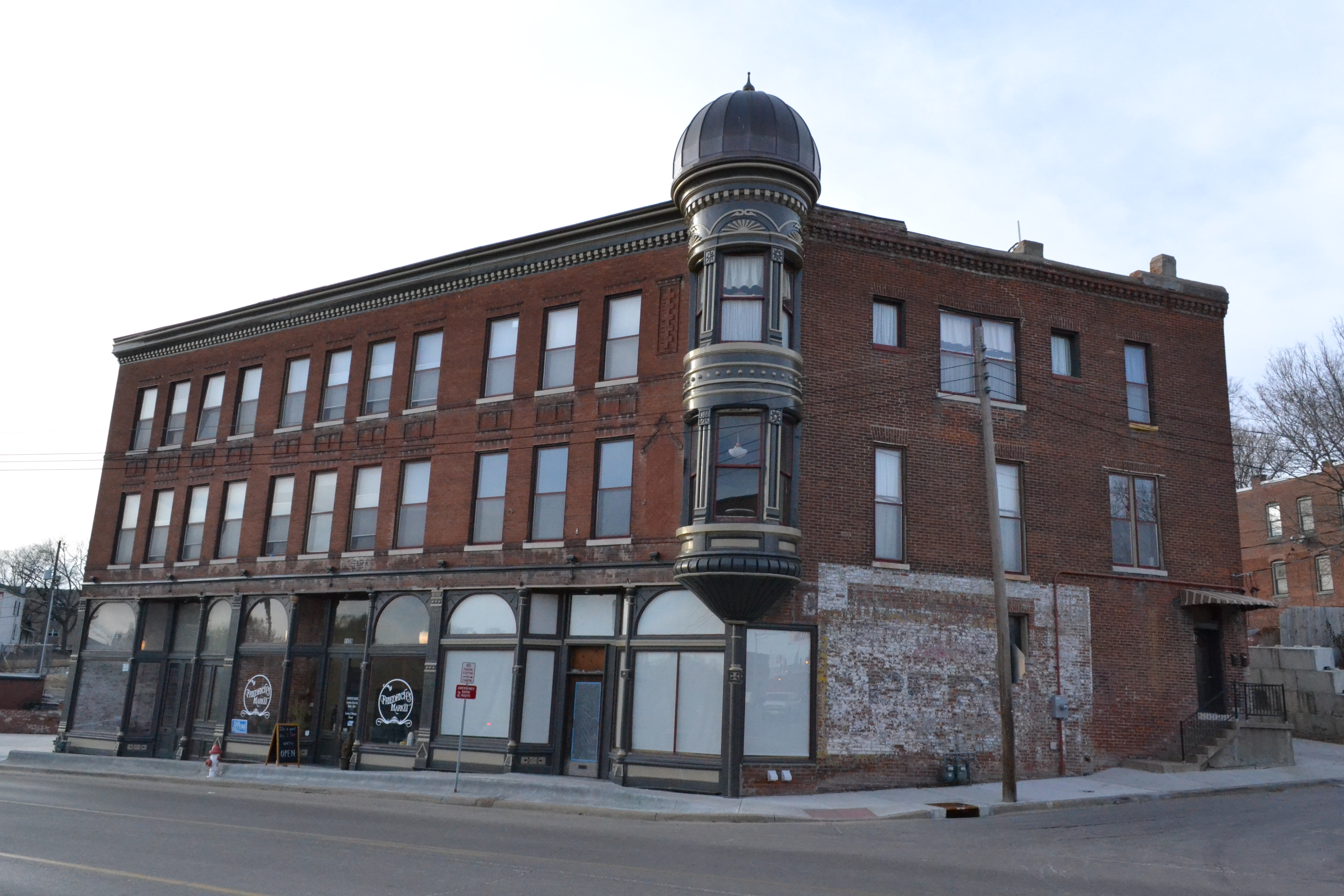

- Location within Missouri Location within the United States
- Location: 1137-1141 Frederick Ave., St. Joseph, Missouri
- Coordinates: 39°46′12″N 94°50′43″W
- Area: 1.7 acres (0.69 ha)
- Built: 1889
- Architectural style: Italianate
- MPS: St. Joseph MPS
- NRHP reference No.: 12001242
- Added to NRHP: January 29, 2013

Ryan Block is a historic commercial building located at St. Joseph, Missouri. It was built in 1889, and is a three-story, trapezoidal shaped, Italianate style brick building. It consists of three units in a row with common walls and cast iron storefronts. It features a dentillated metal cornice and a two-story oriel window sheathed in decorative metal.

It was listed on the National Register of Historic Places in 2012.
