= Everett School (Sioux City, Iowa) =

- U.S. National Register of Historic Places
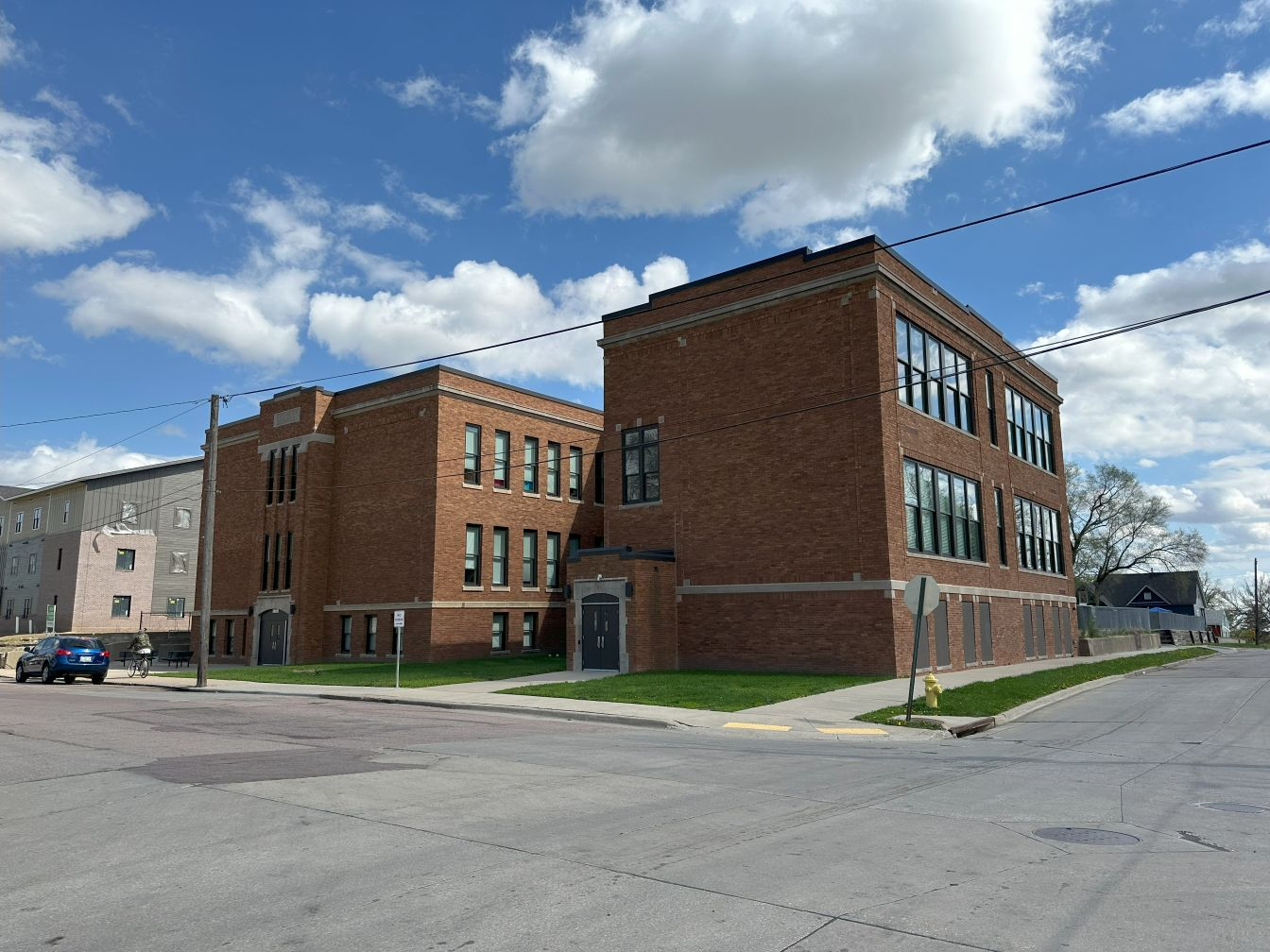
- The building in 2025

- Location within Iowa Location within the United States
- Location: 1314 W. 3rd St. Sioux City, Iowa
- Coordinates: 42°29′57″N 96°25′30″W
- Built: 1888, 1917, 1940
- NRHP reference No.: 100003066
- Added to NRHP: November 5, 2018

Everett School, also known as Davis Addition School, is a historic building located in Sioux City, Iowa, United States. Davis Addition School opened in 1888. It was named for the subdivision in which it was located. The original section of the building is composed of four rooms, and it cost $12,500 to build. It was renamed "Everett" in February of the following year, possibly after Edward Everett, the United States Senator from Massachusetts who gave the main speech at the Gettysburg National Cemetery dedication, the day that Abraham Lincoln delivered the Gettysburg Address. The gymnasium and additional classroom space was added in 1917. The auditorium was added in 1940, and the building has been modernized over the years. Both Everett and Smith Elementary schools were closed in 2011, with their students going to the new Liberty Elementary School. Arch Icon Development of Woodbine, Iowa acquired the building and is in the process of converting it into apartments. It was listed on the National Register of Historic Places in 2018.
