= Christian Sachau Saloon =

- U.S. National Register of Historic Places
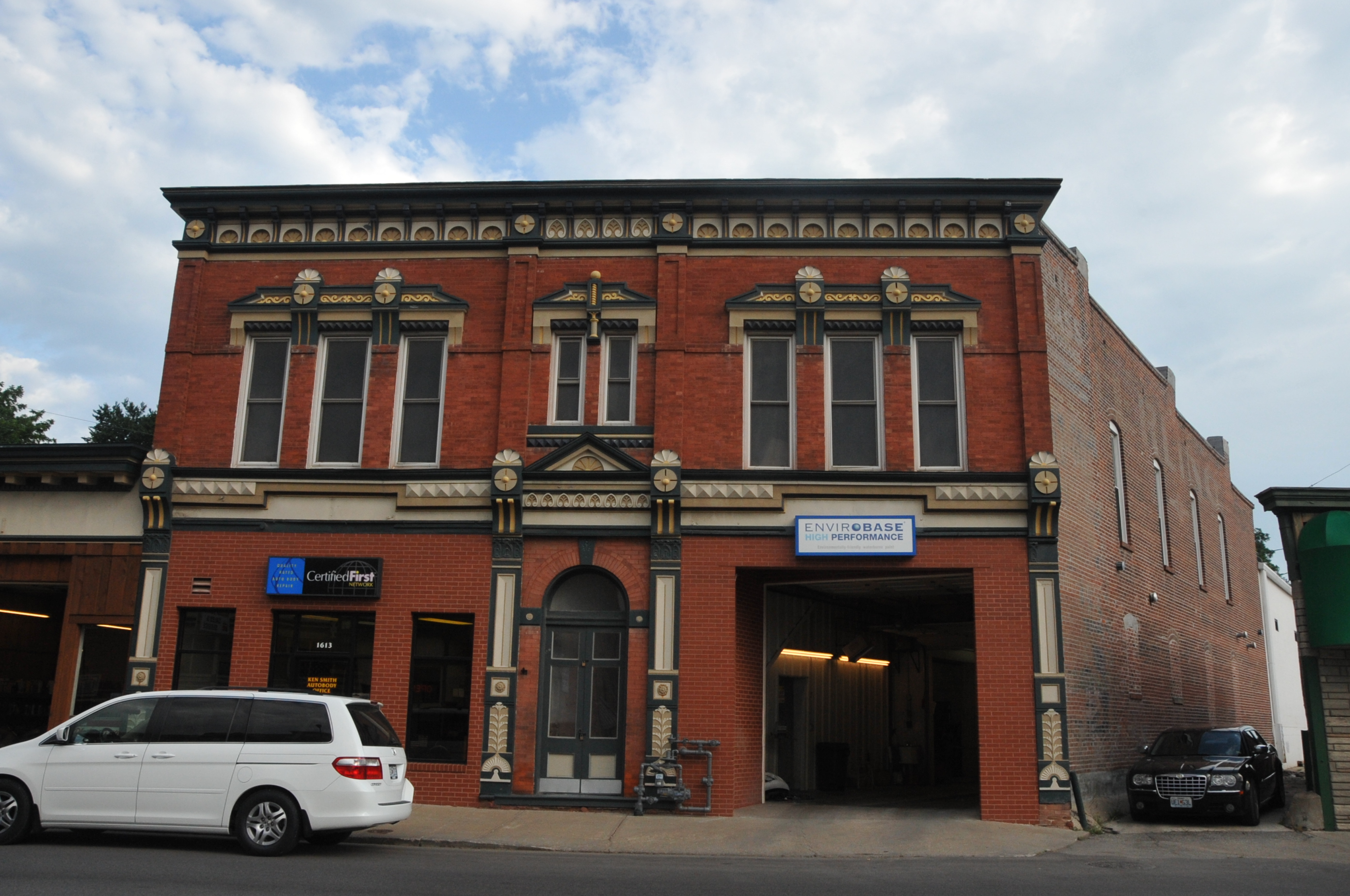
- Christian Sachau Saloon, July 2013

- Location within Missouri Location within the United States
- Location: 1615 Frederick Ave., St. Joseph, Missouri
- Coordinates: 39°46′21″N 94°50′26″W
- Area: less than one acre
- Built: 1889
- MPS: Frederick Avenue MRA
- NRHP reference No.: 85003358
- Added to NRHP: October 25, 1985

Christian Sachau Saloon, also known as the American-Gertsch Glass, Inc., is a historic commercial building located at St. Joseph, Missouri. It was built in 1889, and is a two-story brick building with elaborate cast-metal ornamentation on the primary facade. It has a unique central entranceway with a round arched-door opening.

It was listed on the National Register of Historic Places in 1985.
