= Nelson–Pettis Farmsteads Historic District =

Historic district in Missouri, United States

- U.S. National Register of Historic Places
- U.S. Historic district
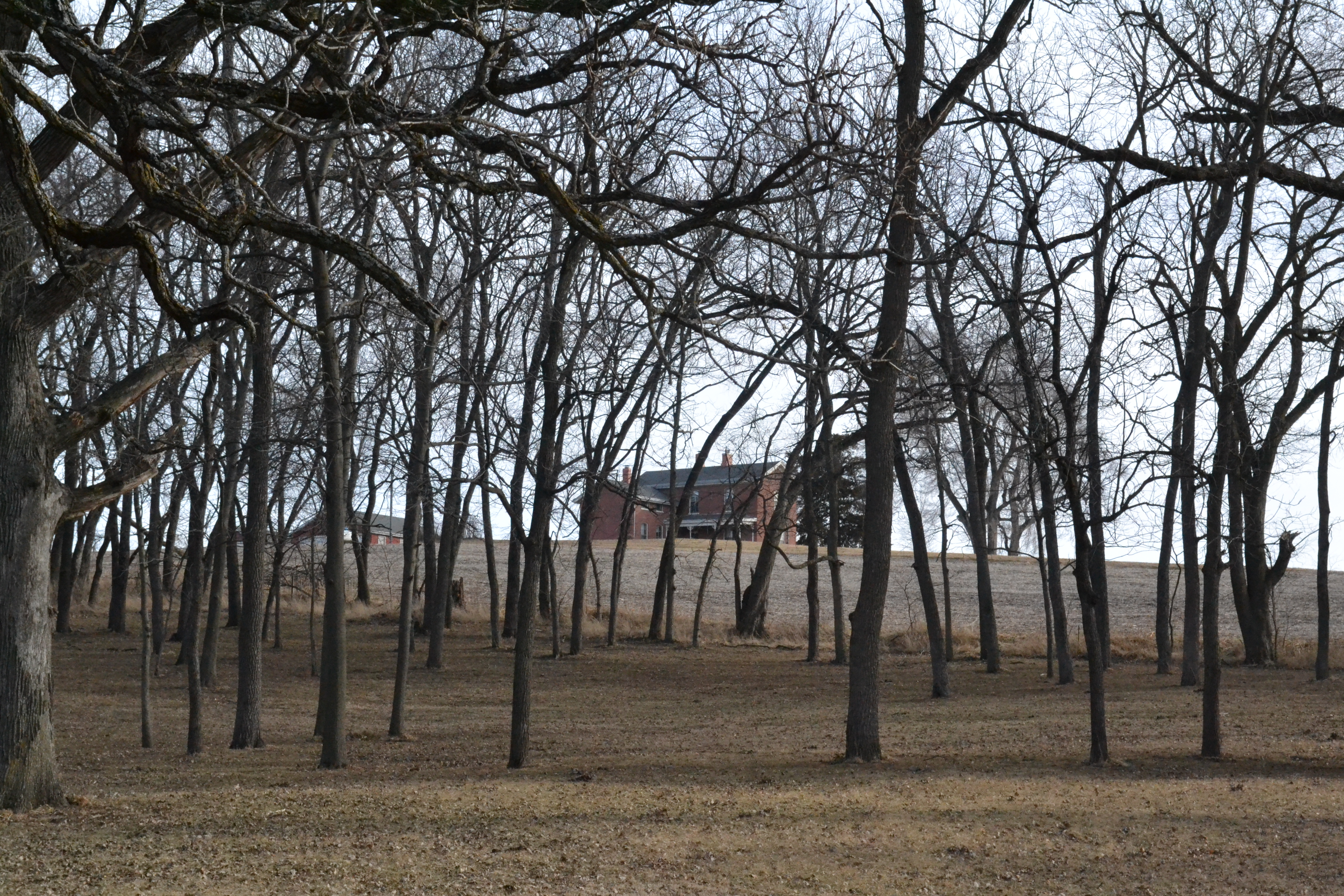

- Location within Missouri Location within the United States
- Location: 4401 Ajax Rd., 3412 Pettis Rd., St. Joseph, Missouri
- Coordinates: 39°43′23″N 94°48′37″W
- Area: 177 acres (72 ha)
- Built: 1871
- Architectural style: I-house
- NRHP reference No.: 95000587
- Added to NRHP: May 11, 1995

Nelson–Pettis Farmsteads Historic District, also known as Poverty Hill, is a national historic district located at St. Joseph, Missouri. The district encompasses four contributing buildings, three contributing sites, and one contributing structure on two adjoining farmsteads - the Nelson farmstead and the Pettis farmstead. The contributing resources are the Nelson I-house farmhouse (c. 1871), root cellar (c. 1871), the Nelson family cemetery (c. 1854), the Pettis farmhouse (c. 1915), the barn (c. 1910), the corn crib / shed (c. 1900), and the agricultural fields (c. 1847-1849).

It was listed on the National Register of Historic Places in 1995.
