= Robidoux School =

- U.S. National Register of Historic Places
- U.S. Historic district – Contributing property
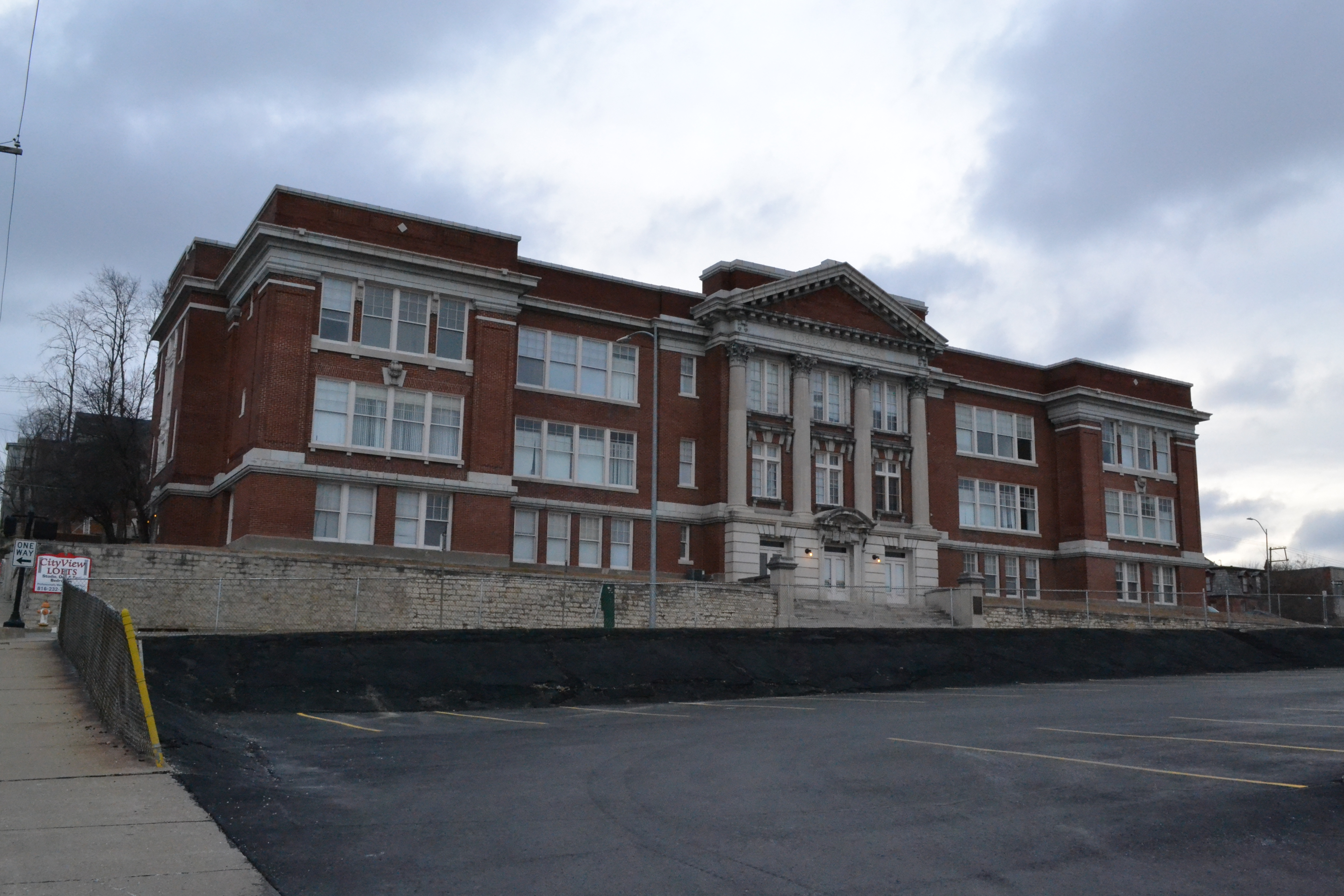

- Location within Missouri Location within the United States
- Location: 201 S. 10th St., St. Joseph, Missouri
- Coordinates: 39°45′55.5″N 94°50′52.2″W
- Area: less than one acre
- Built: 1908 (1866 (first school); 1907 (first building))
- Architect: Edmond Jacques Eckel/Walter Boschen
- Architectural style: Classical Revival
- NRHP reference No.: 83000973
- Added to NRHP: August 11, 1983

The Robidoux School is a historic school building located at 201 South 10th in St. Joseph, Missouri. It was the first building used by what would become Missouri Western State University.

== History ==
The first high school in St. Joseph was built on the site in 1866. In 1895, the high school moved to 13th and Patee and the building was remodeled to be a grammar school named after St. Joseph founder Joseph Robidoux. In 1907, the building was razed and architect Edmond Jacques Eckel and Walter Boschen was commissioned to design the new Classical Revival style building which opened in 1909 at a cost of $130,000 including contents. It included 12 classrooms and an auditorium seating 1,100. In 1914, the building was used as a freshman annex for Central High School (Saint Joseph, Missouri). In 1919, it became the Robidoux Polytechnic High School, a vocational trade school. In 1933, it became home for the St. Joseph Junior College which had been founded in 1915 and was earlier operating out of Central High School. The move occurred at the same time as the Central High School moved to its current location. In 1965, the Junior College became a four-year Missouri Western State College. In 1969, the college moved to its current location on the east side of St. Joseph. This school is not to be confused with the current Robidoux Middle School at 4212 St. Joseph Avenue.

In 1981, the building was added to the National Register of Historic Places. Ironically the application was filed by Missouri Western's rival Northwest Missouri State University. It is located in the Museum Hill Historic District.
