= Market Square Historic District (St. Joseph, Missouri) =

Historic district in Missouri, United States

- Formerly listed on the U.S. National Register of Historic Places
- U.S. Historic district
- Location: Roughly bounded by Edmond, Felix and N. 3rd Sts., and Market Pl., St. Joseph, Missouri
- Area: 7.8 acres (3.2 ha)
- Architectural style: Renaissance
- NRHP reference No.: 72001562

Significant dates
- Added to NRHP: March 17, 1972
- Removed from NRHP: January 1, 1999

Market Square Historic District was a national historic district located at St. Joseph, Missouri. The district encompassed 19 contributing buildings in the central business district of St. Joseph. It developed between about 1850 and 1940, and included representative examples of Renaissance Revival style architecture. The primary building is the Bank of the State of Missouri (1859). Most of the remaining buildings were demolished in 1973.

It was listed on the National Register of Historic Places in 1972 and delisted in 1999. The six remaining buildings in the district were subsumed under the Missouri Valley Trust Company Historic District.
