= Enoch Madison Fenton House =

Historic house in Missouri, United States

- U.S. National Register of Historic Places
- Location within Missouri Location within the United States
- Location: Southeast of Rushville, Missouri
- Coordinates: 39°35′41″N 94°58′30″W
- Area: 1.3 acres (0.53 ha)
- Built: c. 1850
- Architectural style: Greek Revival
- NRHP reference No.: 82003126
- Added to NRHP: April 12, 1982

Enoch Madison Fenton House, also known as the Edward Jackson Fenton House and The Fenton Homeplace, was a historic home located near Rushville, Buchanan County, Missouri. It was built about 1850, and was a two-story, rectangular, Greek Revival style frame dwelling. It had a one-story addition, ell shaped addition, and sat on a limestone foundation. Also on the property were a root cellar and board-and-batten smokehouse. It has been demolished.

It was listed on the National Register of Historic Places in 1982.
