= Wyeth Flats =

- U.S. National Register of Historic Places
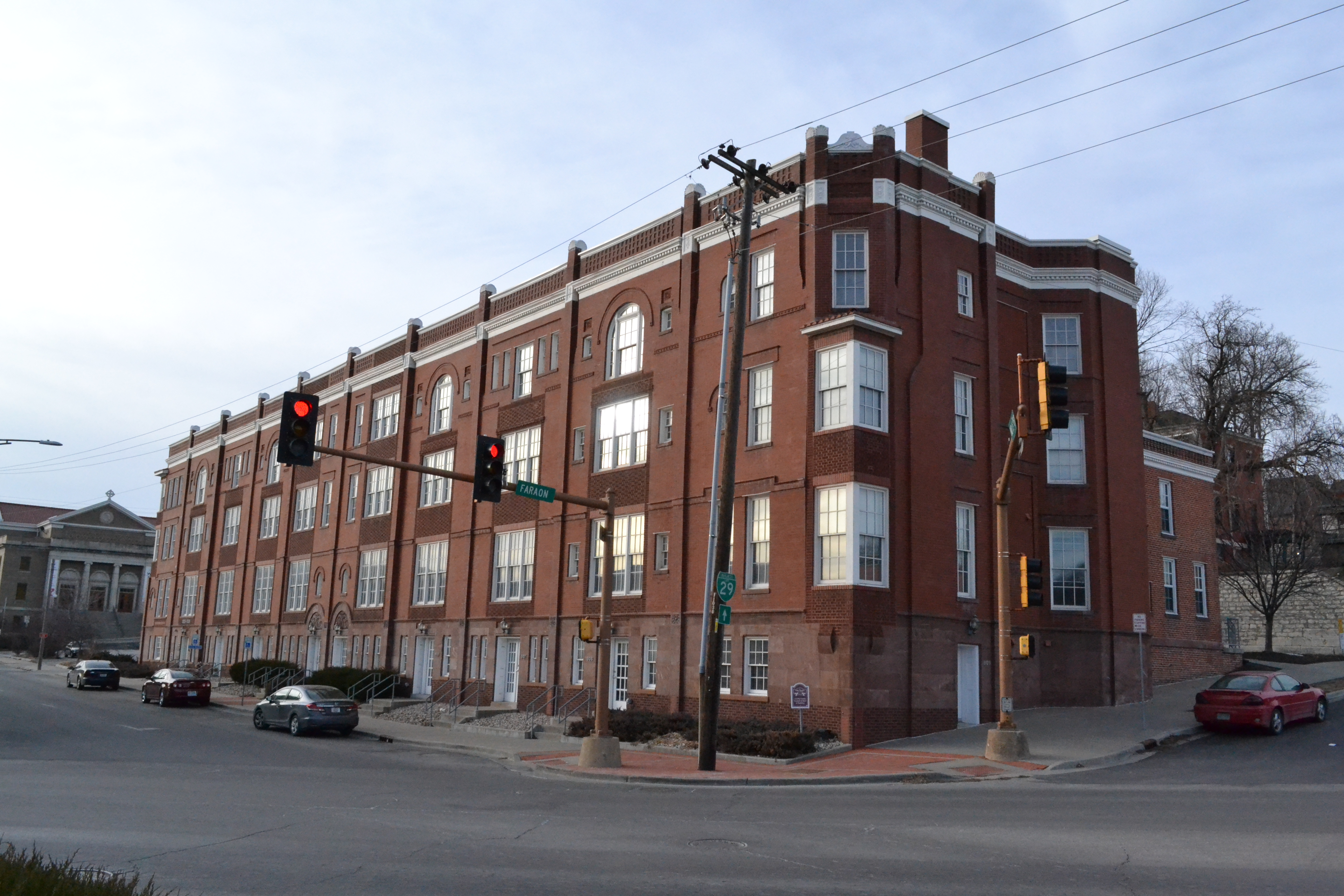

- Location within Missouri Location within the United States
- Location: 1015-1031 Faraon St., St. Joseph, Missouri
- Coordinates: 39°46′9″N 94°50′48″W
- Area: less than one acre
- Built: 1888
- MPS: Frederick Avenue MRA
- NRHP reference No.: 85003355
- Added to NRHP: October 25, 1985

Wyeth Flats, also known as the San Regis Apartments, is a historic apartment building located at St. Joseph, Missouri. It was built in 1888, and is a large four-story brick apartment building. It originally contained multi-story townhouses and converted to an apartment building in the 1940s.

It was listed on the National Register of Historic Places in 1985.
