= Edmond Jacques Eckel House =

Former historic house in Missouri, U.S.

- U.S. National Register of Historic Places
- U.S. Historic district – Contributing property
- Location within Missouri Location within the United States
- Location: 515 N. 4th St., St. Joseph, Missouri
- Coordinates: 39°46′10″N 94°51′18″W
- Area: less than one acre
- Built: 1885; 141 years ago
- Architect: Edmond Jacques Eckel
- NRHP reference No.: 80002318
- Added to NRHP: January 31, 1980

Edmond Jacques Eckel House was a historic home located at St. Joseph, Missouri. It was designed by the architect Edmond Jacques Eckel (1845–1934) and built in 1885. It was a 2 1/2-story, brick dwelling with a truncated hipped roof. It measured 25 feet wide and 36 feet deep and featured a small, flat roofed, wood entrance portico with Tuscan order columns.

Per the 2021 Google Street View, the house has been replaced by a parking lot.

It was listed on the National Register of Historic Places in 1980. It was located in the Robidoux Hill Historic District.
