= Robidoux Hill Historic District =

Historic district in Missouri, United States

- U.S. National Register of Historic Places
- U.S. Historic district
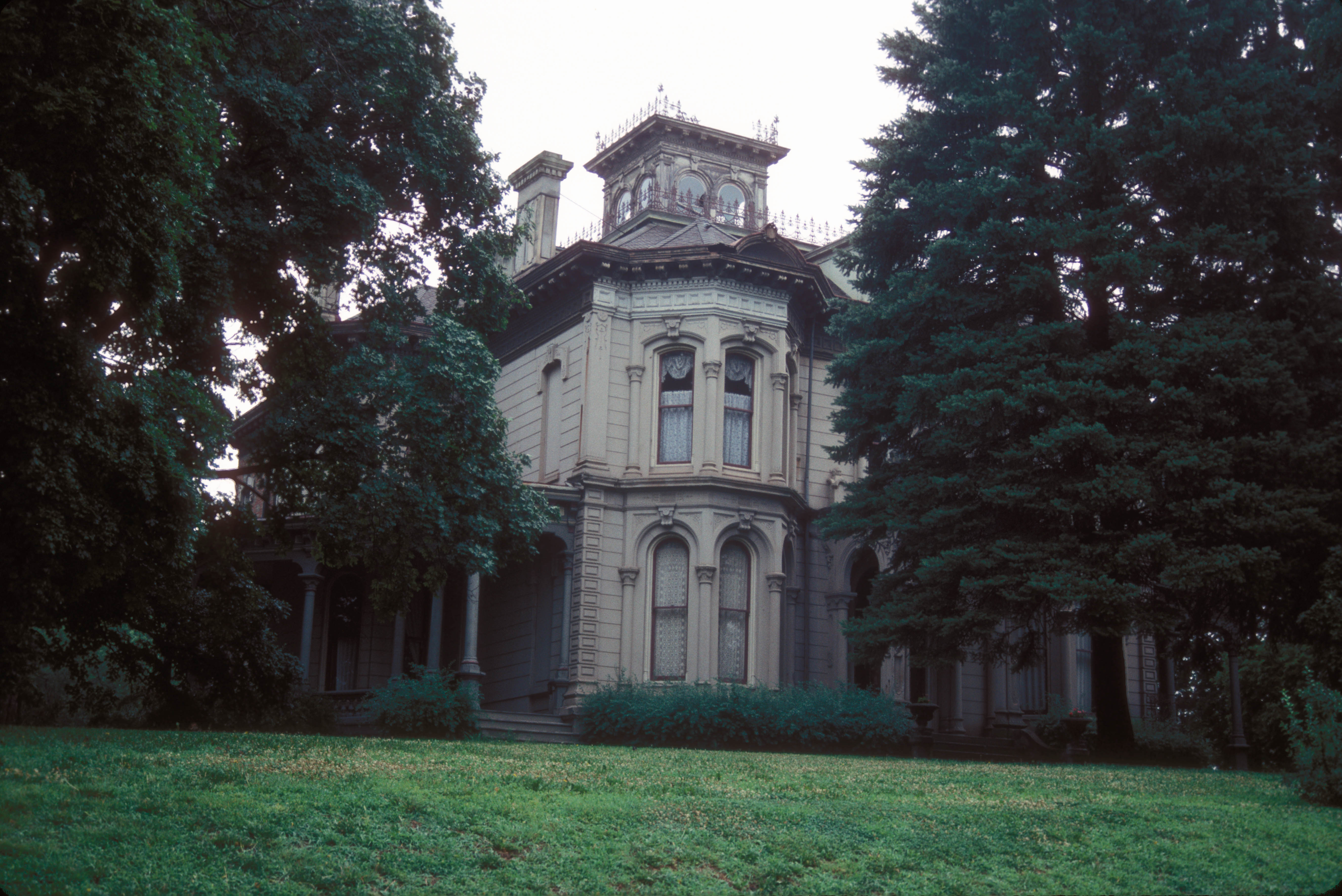
- Robidoux Hill Historic District, January 2007

- Location within Missouri Location within the United States
- Location: Roughly bounded by Franklin St., Robidoux St., Fourth St., Louis St., and Fifth St., St. Joseph, Missouri
- Coordinates: 39°46′19″N 94°51′17″W
- Area: 20.5 acres (8.3 ha)
- Built: 1909
- Architect: Eckel, Edmund Jacques; Et al.
- Architectural style: Second Empire, Italianate, Queen Anne
- MPS: St. Joseph MPS
- NRHP reference No.: 89000992
- Added to NRHP: August 3, 1989

Robidoux Hill Historic District is a national historic district located at St. Joseph, Missouri. The district encompasses 61 contributing buildings in a predominantly residential section of St. Joseph. It developed between about 1865 and 1909, and includes representative examples of Italianate, Second Empire, and Queen Anne style architecture. Located in the district is the separately listed Edmond Jacques Eckel House designed by architect Edmond Jacques Eckel (1845–1934). Other notable buildings include the Lemon House (1871), Donovan House (c. 1865, 1895), McKinney House (1887), Inslee House (c. 1867), Jonathan M. Bassett (c. 1860, 1880s), and U.S. Weather Bureau Building (1909).

It was listed on the National Register of Historic Places in 1989.
