= Corby–Forsee Building =

- U.S. National Register of Historic Places
- U.S. Historic district – Contributing property
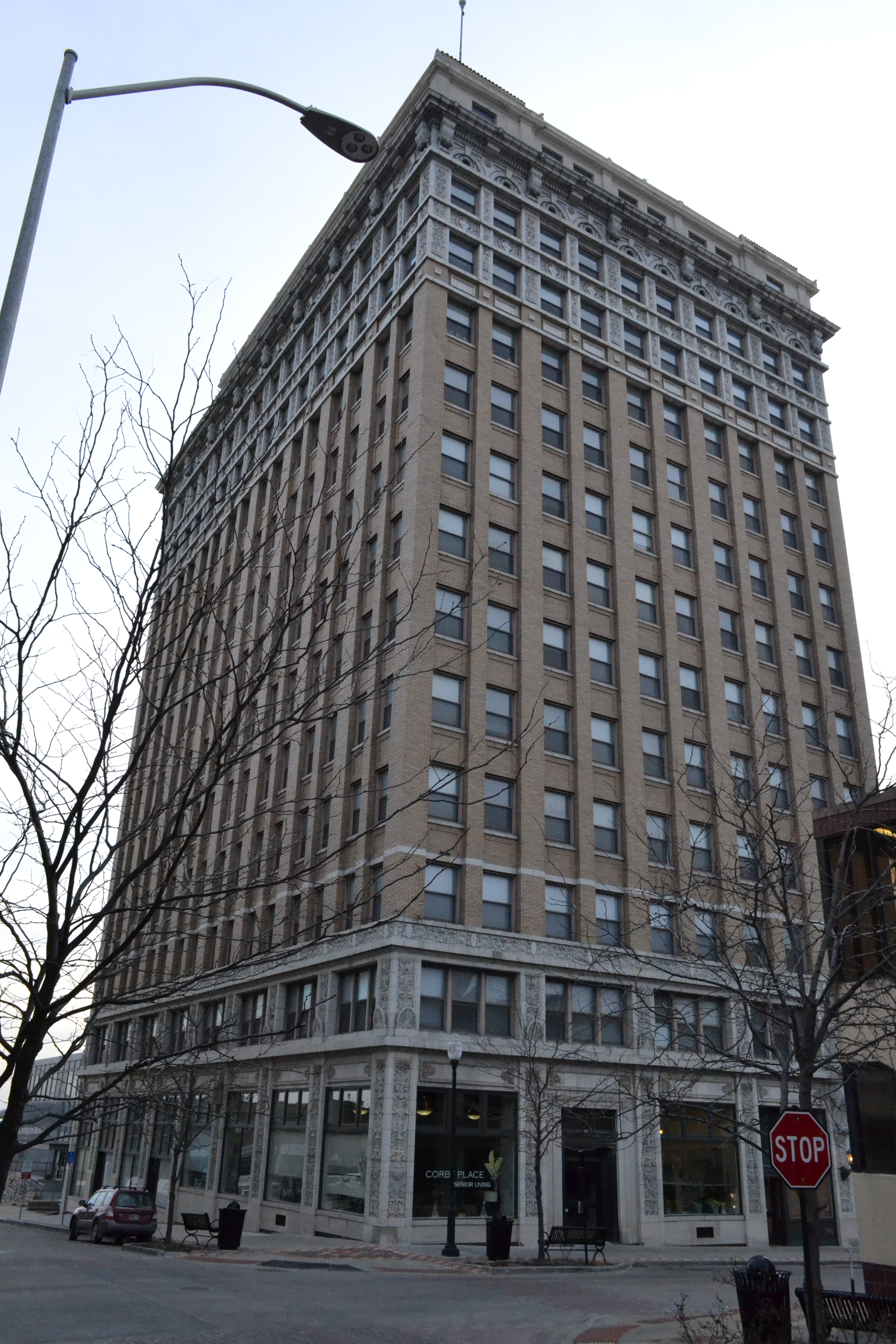

- Location within Missouri Location within the United States
- Location: 5th and Felix Sts., St. Joseph, Missouri
- Coordinates: 39°45′59″N 94°51′15″W
- Area: less than one acre
- Built: 1910, 1927
- Built by: Selden-Breck Construction Co.
- Architect: Eames & Young (1910); Eckel & Aldrich (1927)
- NRHP reference No.: 80002317
- Added to NRHP: March 27, 1980

Corby–Forsee Building, also known as the Corby Building, is a historic commercial building located at St. Joseph, Missouri. It was designed by the architectural firm Eames & Young and built in 1910. It is a 12-story, reinforced concrete building faced with yellow brick and grey-buff terra cotta detailing at the first, second, eleventh and twelfth floor levels. A one-story addition was designed by the architecture firm of Eckel & Aldrich and constructed in 1927 to house the trade halls of the St. Joseph Grain Exchange.

It was listed on the National Register of Historic Places in 1980. It is located in the St. Joseph's Commerce and Banking Historic District.
