= Dewey Avenue–West Rosine Historic District =

Historic district in Missouri, United States

- U.S. National Register of Historic Places
- U.S. Historic district
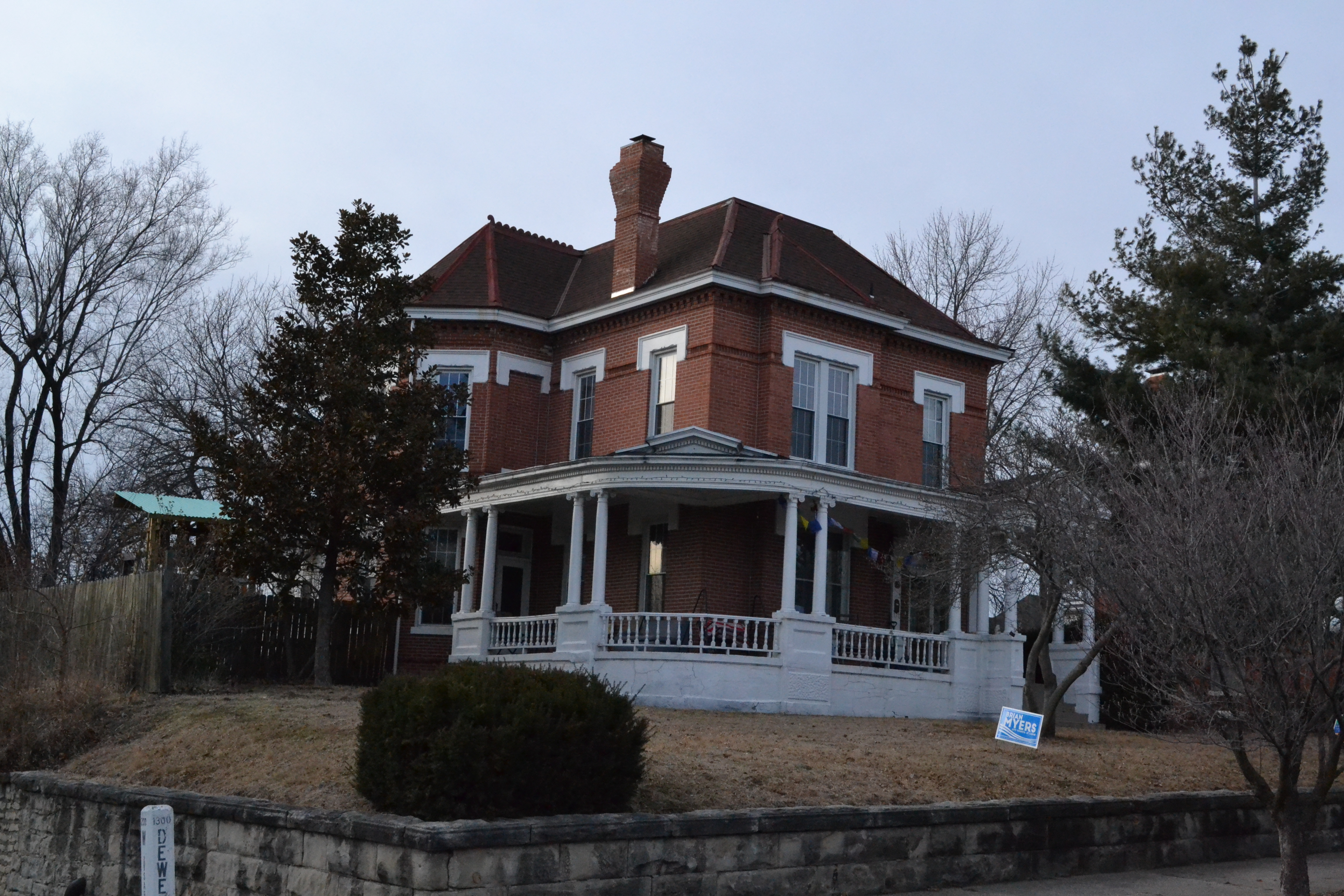
- Nowland House

- Location within Missouri Location within the United States
- Location: Roughly bound by Prospect Ave., Auguste St., Dewey Avenue and West Rosine St., St. Joseph, Missouri
- Coordinates: 39°46′42″N 94°51′39″W
- Area: 8.3 acres (3.4 ha)
- Built by: Nowland, Charles H.
- Architectural style: Italianate, Queen Anne, et al.
- MPS: St. Joseph MPS
- NRHP reference No.: 02000816
- Added to NRHP: August 1, 2002

Dewey Avenue–West Rosine Historic District is a national historic district located at St. Joseph, Missouri. The district encompasses 37 contributing buildings and 1 contributing site in a predominantly residential section of St. Joseph. It developed between about 1880 and 1930, and includes representative examples of Italianate, Second Empire, Queen Anne, Colonial Revival, Tudor Revival, and American Craftsman style architecture. Notable buildings include the Marshall B. Stroud House (1890), John and Frank Whitman House (1890), Johanna Johnson House (1908), Frank Lacy House (1900), and a number of speculative houses built by Charles H. Nowland.

It was listed on the National Register of Historic Places in 2002.
