= Lawler Motor Company Building =

- U.S. National Register of Historic Places
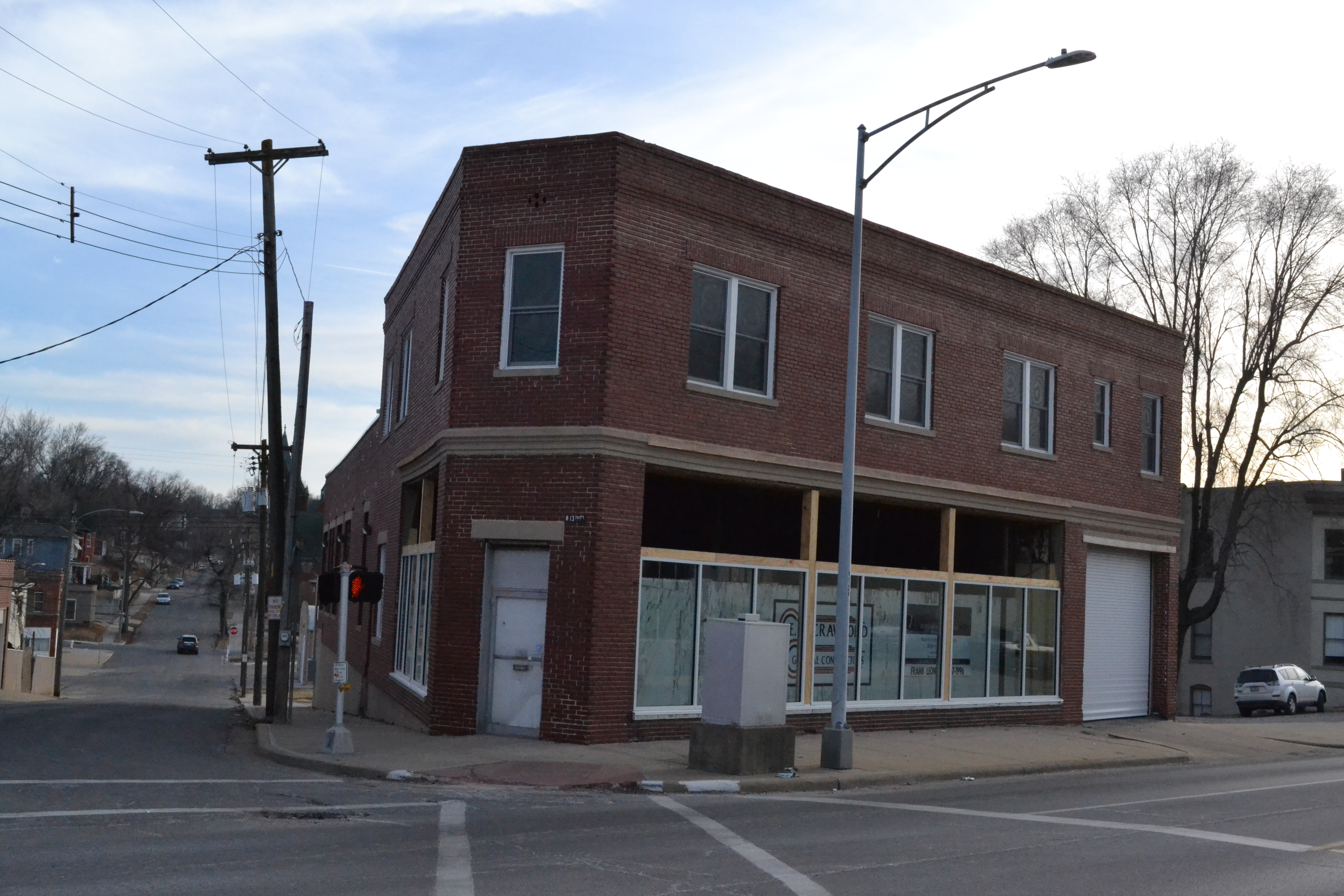

- Location within Missouri Location within the United States
- Location: 1224 Frederick Ave., St. Joseph, Missouri
- Coordinates: 39°46′20″N 94°50′40″W
- Area: less than one acre
- Built: 1913
- Architectural style: 2-part commercial block
- MPS: St. Joseph, Buchanan County, Missouri MPS AD
- NRHP reference No.: 08001285
- Added to NRHP: January 8, 2009

Lawler Motor Company Building, also known as the Farmer Automobile Company Building, is a historic commercial building located at St. Joseph, Missouri. It was built in 1913, and is a two-story, trapezoidal shaped small-scale brick commercial building. It was designed as an automobile showroom and service center, with a second-story apartment. The building housed a Ford dealership from 1917 to 1928. Michael Patrick Lawler (1884-1957) was the founder and owner of the Lawler Motor Company. Up until 1928 Lawler sold only Fords and was golfing buddies with Henry Ford. During one such golf game, Henry Ford asked Lawler if he would help pitch the local city council for approval to build a new Ford assembly plant in St. Joe. When Lawler asked the council they turned the request down saying "St. Joe is an ag town, not an industrial town" which is why the assembly plant was built in Kansas City instead. Sometime thereafter, Lawler moved the dealership to Kansas City and expanded the line to include Nash as well as Ford autos.

Eventually the Lawler Motor Company building fell into disrepair until it was purchased and renovated by the owners of River Bluff Brewing Company.

It was listed on the National Register of Historic Places in 2009.
