= Cathedral Historic District =

Cathedral Historic District may refer to:

- Cathedral Historic District (Dubuque, Iowa)
- Cathedral Historic District (Sioux Falls, South Dakota)
