= Vosteen-Hauck House =

Historic house in Missouri, United States

- U.S. National Register of Historic Places
- Location within Missouri Location within the United States
- Location: 913 N. 2nd St., St. Joseph, Missouri
- Coordinates: 39°46′24″N 94°51′28″W
- Area: less than one acre
- Built: c. 1850, c. 1885
- Architectural style: Italianate
- NRHP reference No.: 82003130
- Added to NRHP: September 23, 1982

Vosteen-Hauck House was a historic duplex townhouse located at St. Joseph, Missouri. The original section was built about 1850, and enlarged with a two-story, rectangular, Italianate style section about 1885. It was constructed of brick and had a truncated hipped roof and arched windows. It has been demolished.

It was listed on the National Register of Historic Places in 1982.
