= St. Joseph's Commerce and Banking Historic District =

Historic district in Missouri, United States

- U.S. National Register of Historic Places
- U.S. Historic district
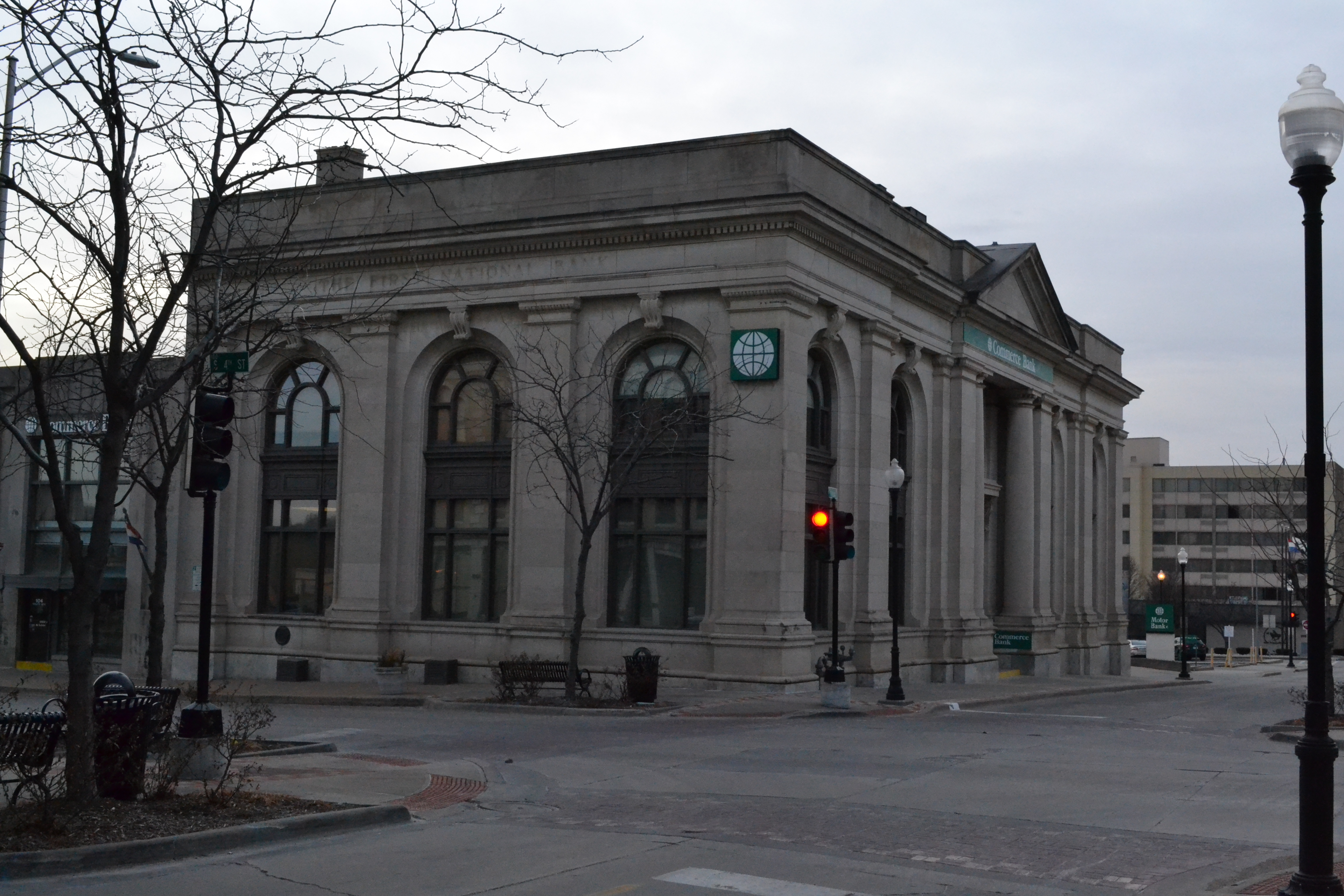
- Old First National Bank

- Location within Missouri Location within the United States
- Location: Roughly bounded by 3rd, 91t, Francis, and Edmonds St., St. Joseph, Missouri
- Coordinates: 39°45′59″N 94°51′09″W
- Area: 11 acres (4.5 ha)
- Architect: Edmond Jacques Eckel et al.
- Architectural style: Classical Revival, Italianate, et.al.
- NRHP reference No.: 01000709
- Added to NRHP: July 5, 2001

St. Joseph's Commerce and Banking Historic District is a national historic district located at St. Joseph, Missouri. The district encompasses 39 contributing buildings in the central business district of St. Joseph. Between 1859 and 1950, various architectural styles were developed, including Italianate, Classical Revival, and Streamline Moderne. Located in the district are the separately listed German-American Bank Building, Corby-Forsee Building, Missouri Theater, Missouri Theater Building, and Missouri Valley Trust Company Historic District. Other notable buildings include the Ballinger Building (1889), Commerce Building (1889, 1941), First National Bank of St. Joseph (1902, 1963), Lehman's, Plymouth Building (1908), and the United Building (1917-1918) by the architecture firm of Eckel & Aldrich.

It was listed on the National Register of Historic Places in 2001.
