= Century Apartments =

- U.S. National Register of Historic Places
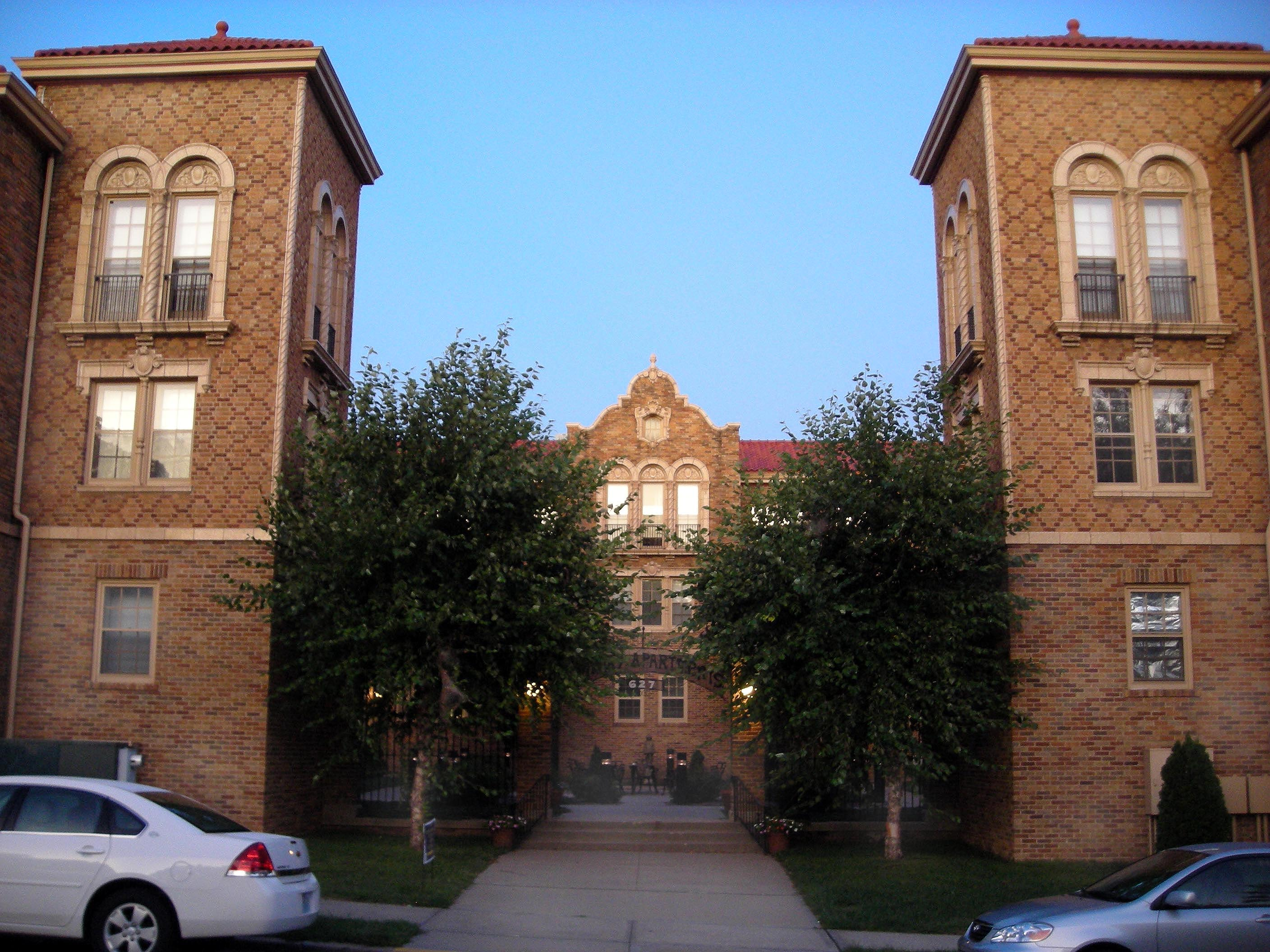
- Century Apartments, September 2007

- Location within Missouri Location within the United States
- Location: 627 N. 25th St., St. Joseph, Missouri
- Coordinates: 39°46′16″N 94°49′47″W
- Area: 1.2 acres (0.49 ha)
- Built: 1926
- Built by: Lehr Construction Co.
- Architect: Boschen, Walter
- Architectural style: Mission/spanish Revival
- MPS: St. Joseph MPS
- NRHP reference No.: 01000712
- Added to NRHP: July 5, 2001

Century Apartments, also known as the T.L. Ritchey Apartments, is a historic apartment building located at St. Joseph, Missouri. It was built in 1926, and is a three-story, U-shaped, Mission Revival style buff brick and terra cotta building. It features a large central courtyard, polychromatic brickwork, and quatrefoil windows.

It was listed on the National Register of Historic Places in 2001.
