= Virginia Flats =

- U.S. National Register of Historic Places
- U.S. Historic district – Contributing property
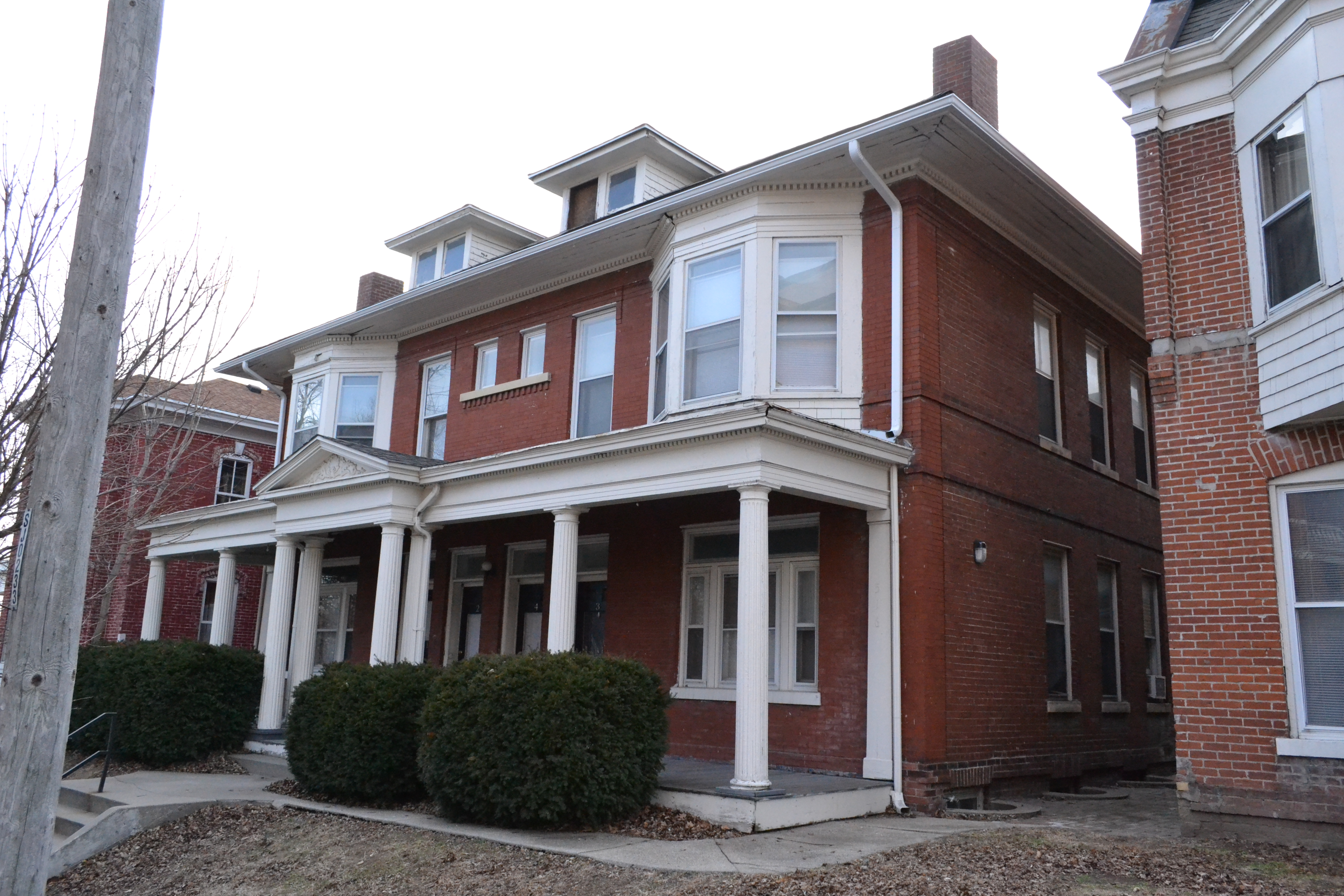

- Location within Missouri Location within the United States
- Location: 516-518 and 520-528 N. 10th St., St. Joseph, Missouri
- Coordinates: 39°46′14″N 94°50′54″W
- Area: less than one acre
- Built: 1888, 1901
- Architect: Eckel & Mann
- Architectural style: Colonial Revival, Queen Anne
- MPS: St. Joseph MPS
- NRHP reference No.: 92000586
- Added to NRHP: May 21, 1992

Virginia Flats, also known as the Summit Place Flats, are two historic apartment buildings located in St. Joseph, Missouri. They were designed by the architectural firm Eckel & Mann. The south building was built in 1901, and is a two-story, rectangular Colonial Revival style brick four-plex with a hipped roof and a full-length, one-story front porch. The north building was built in 1888, and is a larger two-story rectangular brick Queen Anne style apartment building with 14 apartments, 7 on each floor.

It was listed on the National Register of Historic Places in 1992. It is located in the Cathedral Hill Historic District
