= Harris Addition Historic District =

Historic district in Missouri, United States

- U.S. National Register of Historic Places
- U.S. Historic district
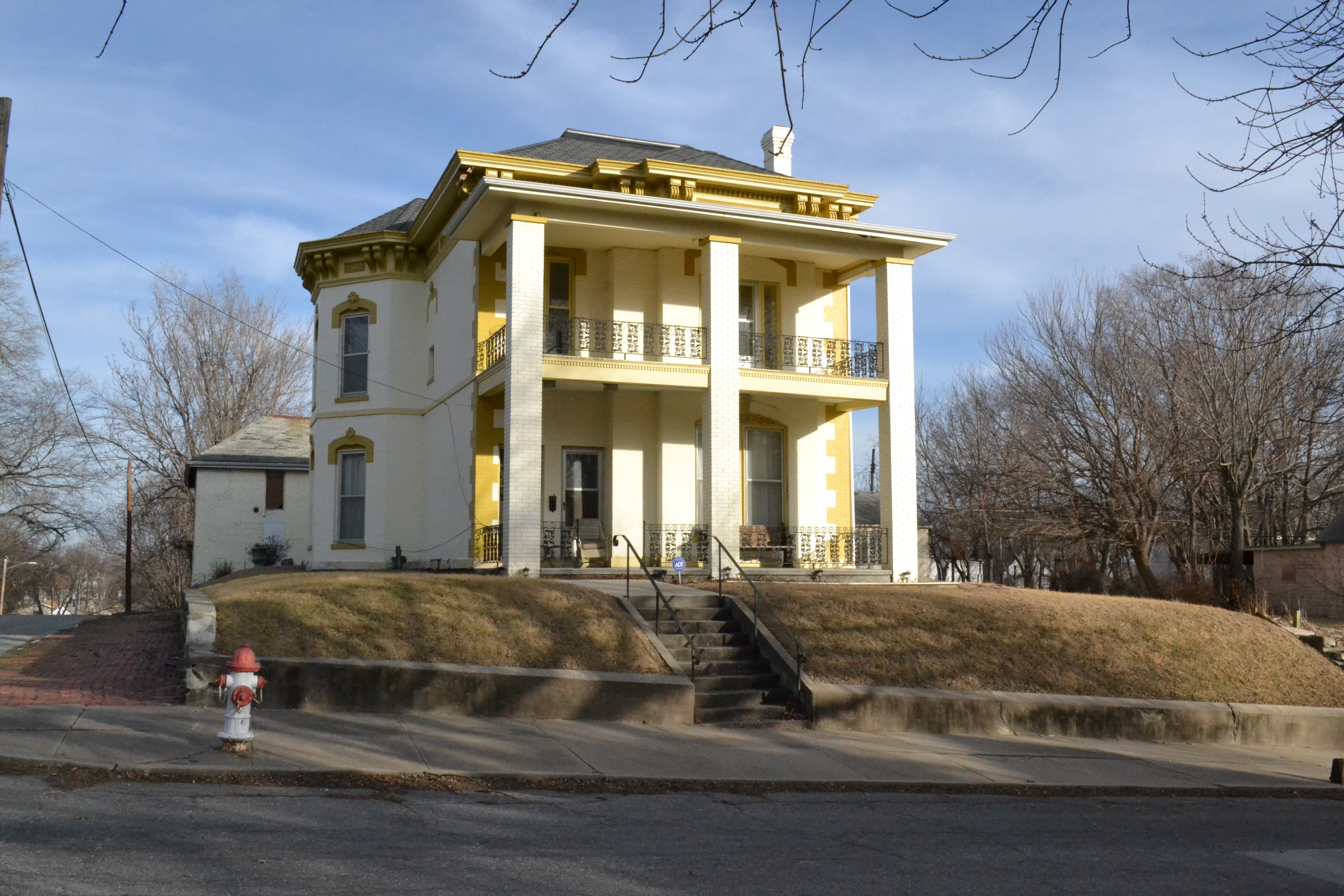
- Wooten House

- Location within Missouri Location within the United States
- Location: Roughly bounded by 16th St, Dalton St., 22nd St. and Edmond St., St. Joseph, Missouri
- Coordinates: 39°46′04″N 94°50′17″W
- Area: 67.7 acres (27.4 ha)
- Built by: Englehart, George J.; Haynes, W.H.
- Architectural style: Colonial Revival, Tudor Revival, et al.
- MPS: St. Joseph MPS
- NRHP reference No.: 01000723
- Added to NRHP: January 13, 2003

Harris Addition Historic District is a national historic district located at St. Joseph, Missouri. The district encompasses 288 contributing buildings and 1 contributing site in a predominantly residential section of St. Joseph. It developed between about 1866 and 1940, and includes representative examples of Colonial Revival, Tudor Revival, and American Craftsman style architecture. Notable buildings include the William Payne House (1889), W.C. Green Apartment Building (c. 1910), C.B. Powers House (c. 1888), the Parry-Motter House designed by architect Edmond Jacques Eckel (1845–1934), and a number of speculative houses built by George J. Englehart and W.H. Haynes.

It was listed on the National Register of Historic Places in 2003.
