= John D. Richardson Dry Goods Company =

- U.S. National Register of Historic Places
- U.S. Historic district – Contributing property
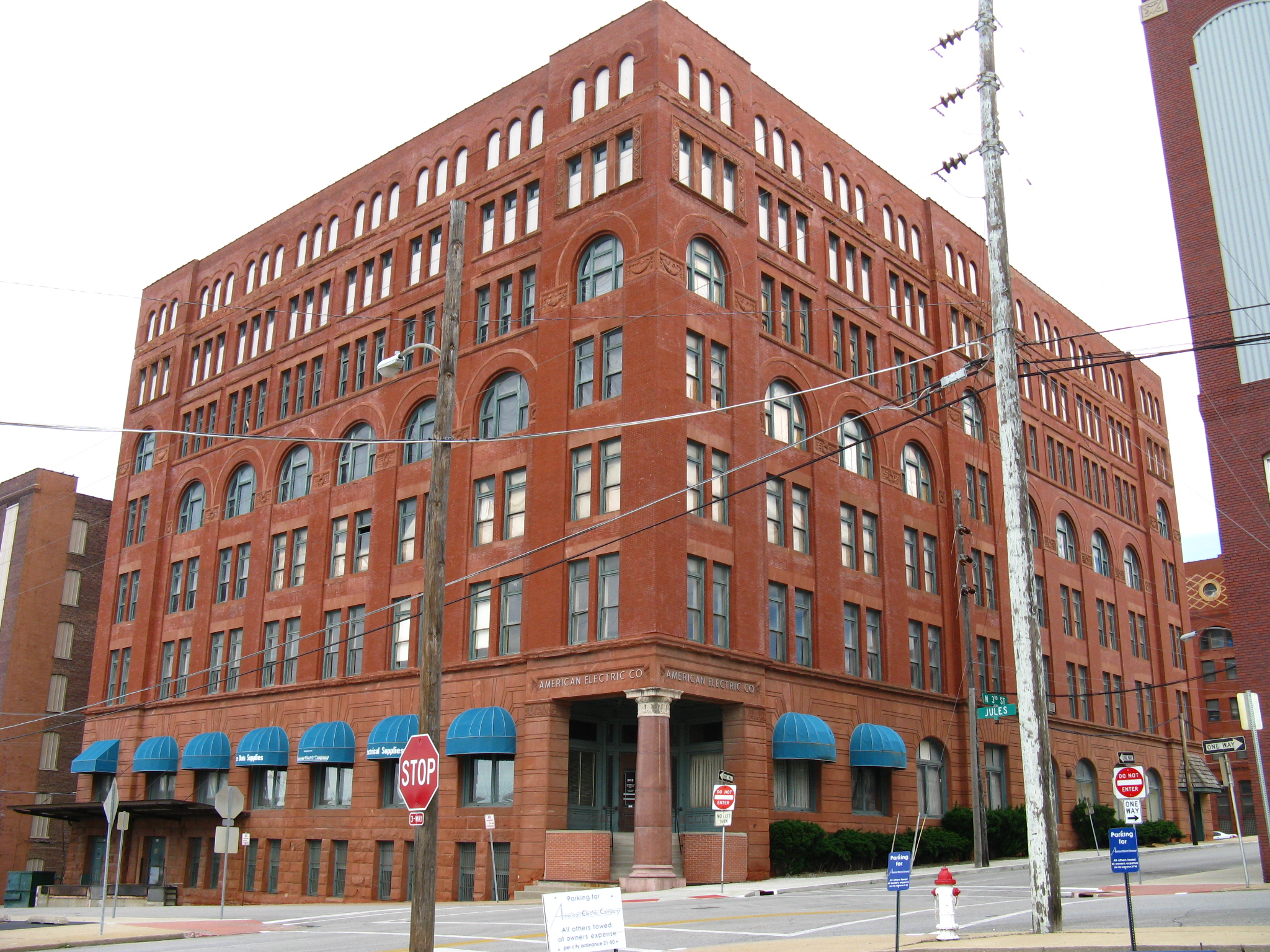
- John D. Richardson Dry Goods Company, June 2008

- Location within Missouri Location within the United States
- Location: 300 N. 3rd St., St. Joseph, Missouri
- Coordinates: 39°46′7″N 94°51′25″W
- Area: less than one acre
- Built: 1892
- Architect: Eckel, E.J.
- Architectural style: Romanesque, Richardsonian Romanesque
- NRHP reference No.: 82003128
- Added to NRHP: April 12, 1982

John D. Richardson Dry Goods Company, also known as the American Electric Company, is a historic commercial building located at St. Joseph, Missouri. It was designed by architect Edmond Jacques Eckel (1845–1934) and built in 1892. It is a seven-story, Richardsonian Romanesque style brick and stone building. It measures 196 feet by 136 feet. It features terra cotta faced facades on Jules and Third Street that are detailed with Renaissance derivation motifs.

It was listed on the National Register of Historic Places in 1982. It is located in the Central-North Commercial Historic District.
