= Charles A. and Annie Buddy House =

Historic house in Missouri, United States

- U.S. National Register of Historic Places
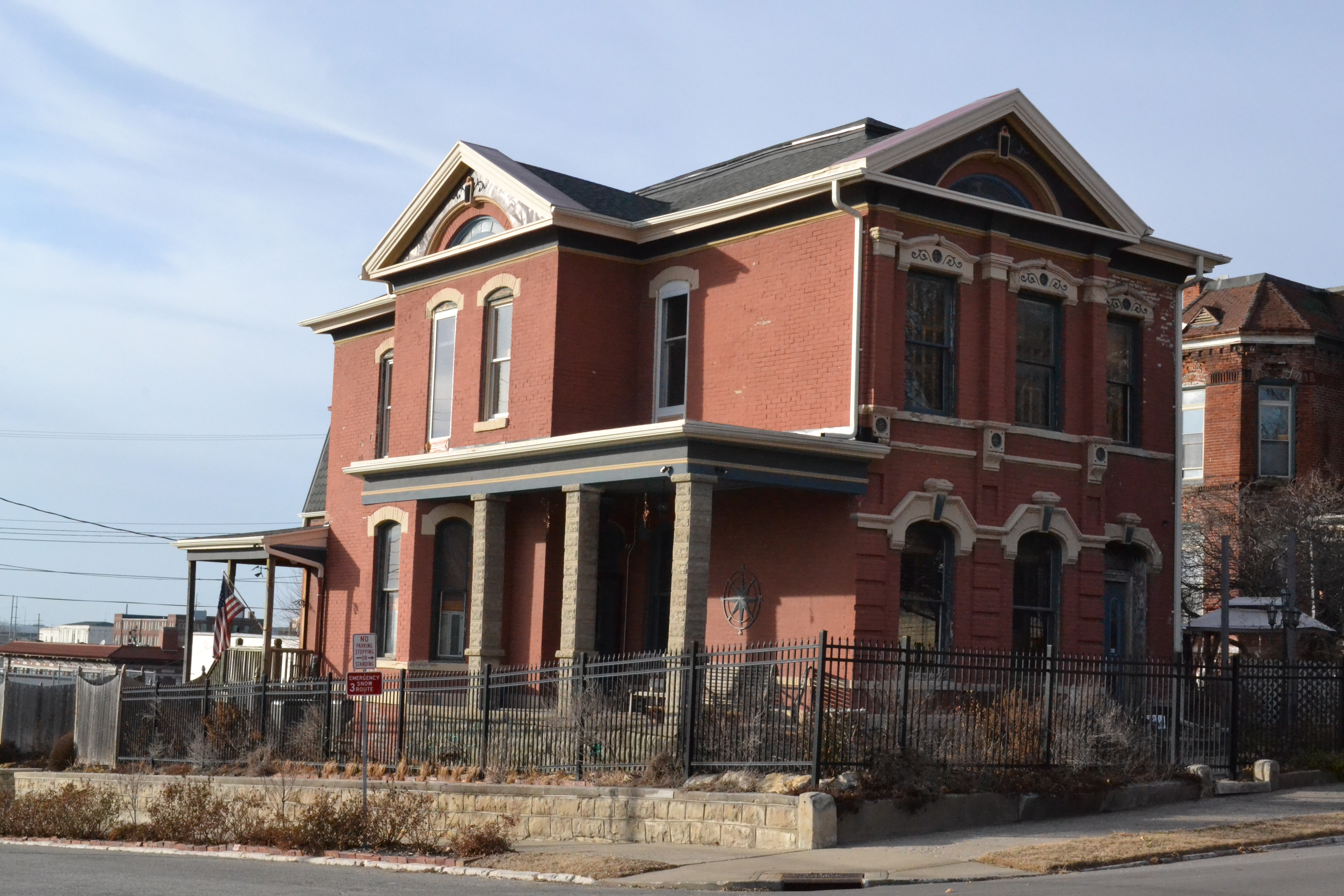

- Location within Missouri Location within the United States
- Location: 424 S. 9th St., St. Joseph, Missouri
- Coordinates: 39°45′49″N 94°50′58″W
- Area: less than one acre
- Built: 1883
- Architectural style: Italianate
- MPS: St. Joseph MPS
- NRHP reference No.: 04000427
- Added to NRHP: May 14, 2004

Charles A. and Annie Buddy House is a historic home located at St. Joseph, Missouri. It was built in 1883, and is a two-story, rectangular, Italianate style masonry dwelling. It has a one-story rear wing, low-pitched truncated hipped roof, and front porch.

It was listed on the National Register of Historic Places in 2004.
