= John Sublett Jr. and Caroline Ashton Logan House =

Historic house in Missouri, United States

- U.S. National Register of Historic Places
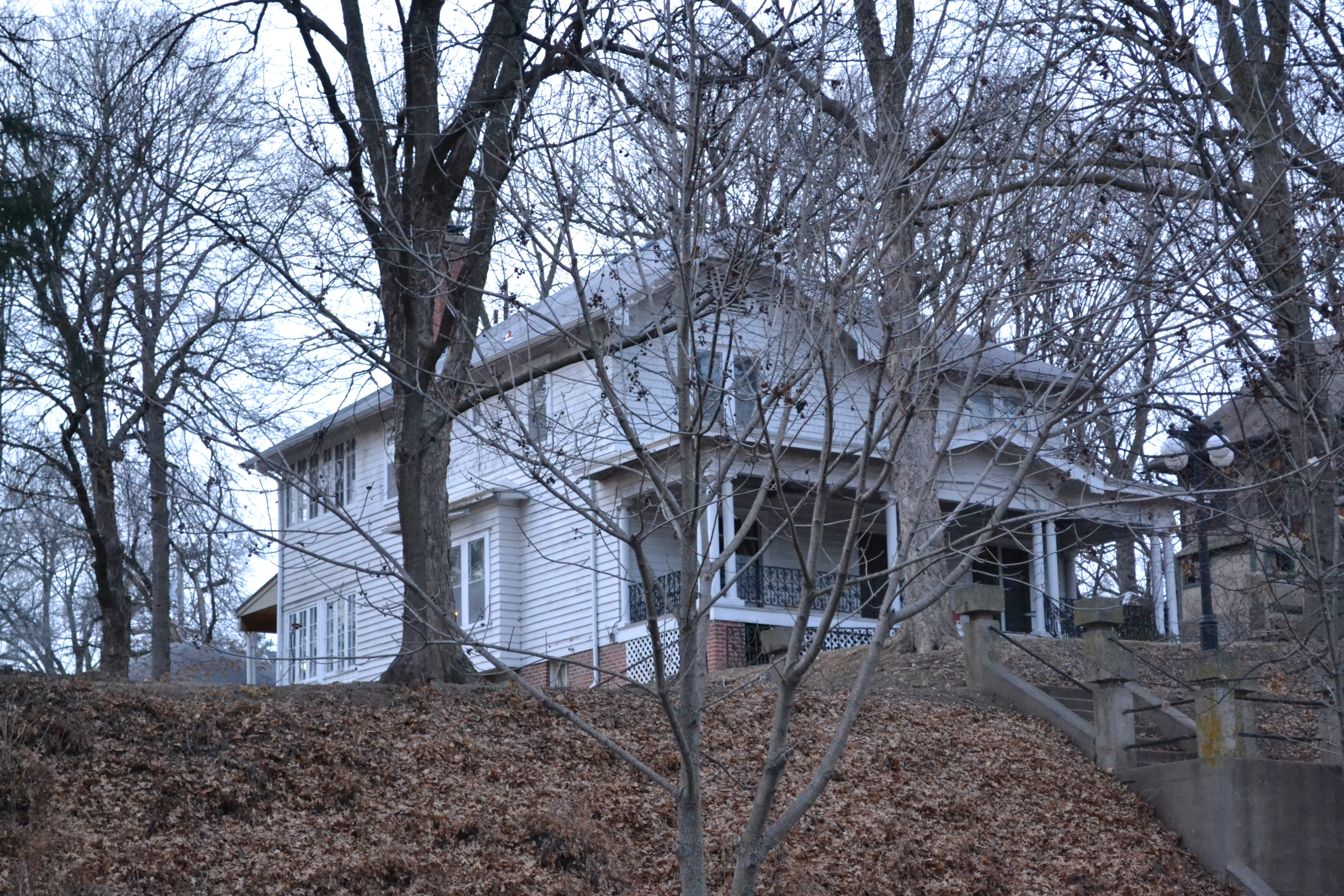

- Location within Missouri Location within the United States
- Location: 1906 N. 22nd St., St. Joseph, Missouri
- Coordinates: 39°47′10″N 94°50′5″W
- Area: less than one acre
- Built: 1908
- Architect: Powell, E. Gray
- Architectural style: Late 19th And Early 20th Century American Movements
- MPS: St. Joseph, Buchanan County, Missouri MPS AD
- NRHP reference No.: 06000991
- Added to NRHP: May 7, 2007

John Sublett Jr. and Caroline Ashton Logan House, also known as the Logan Home Place, is a historic home located at St. Joseph, Missouri. It was built in 1908, and is a two-story, eclectic frame dwelling Prairie School influence and Arts & Crafts detailing. It has a low-pitched hipped roof and one-story full-width front porch. Also on the property is a contributing one-story outbuilding.

It was listed on the National Register of Historic Places in 2007.
