= Buchanan County Courthouse (Missouri) =

- Buchanan County Courthouse and Jail
- U.S. National Register of Historic Places
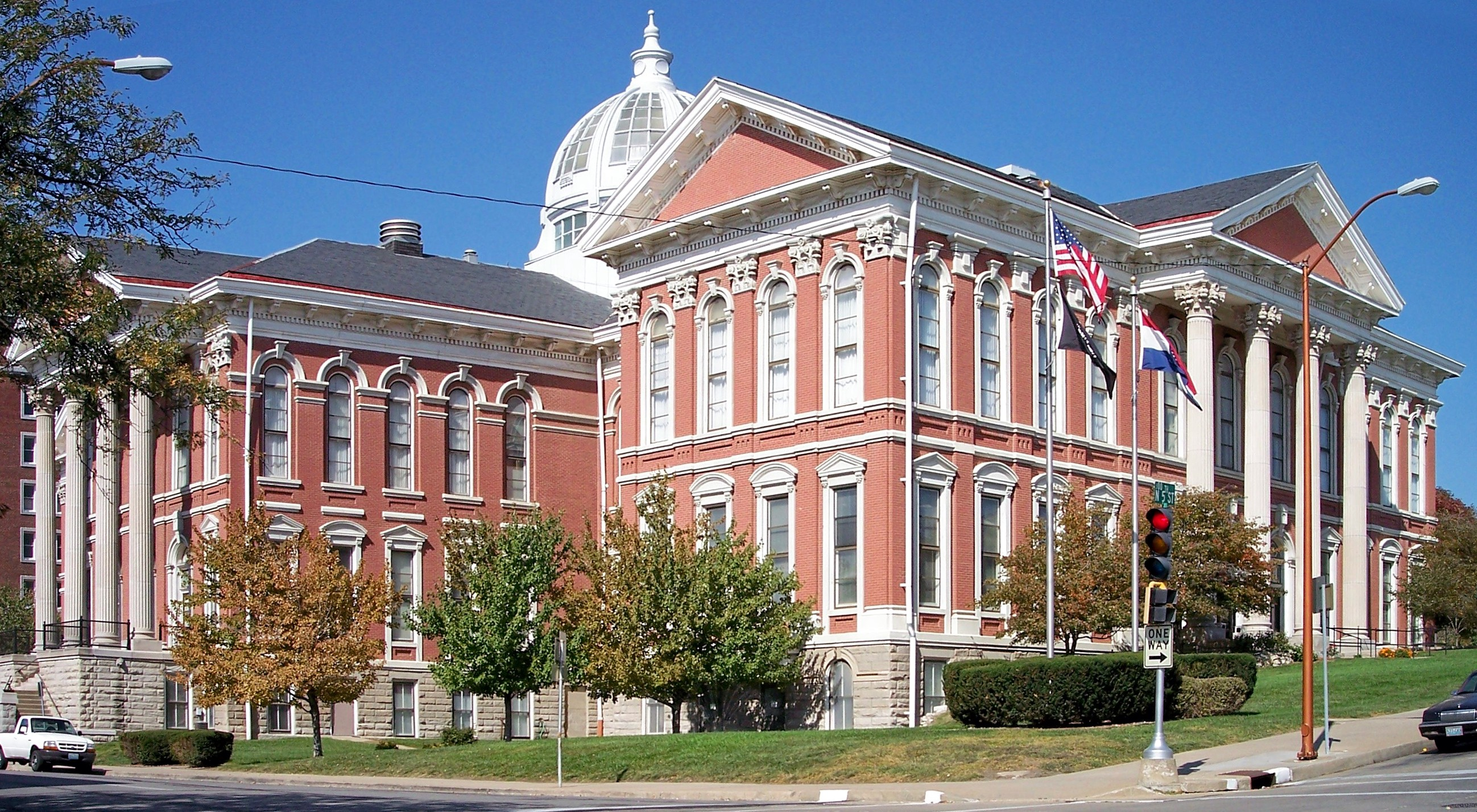

- Location within Missouri Location within the United States
- Location: Courthouse Sq., St. Joseph, Missouri
- Coordinates: 39°46′5″N 94°51′20″W
- Built: 1873
- Architect: Meagher, P.F.; DeClue, John
- Architectural style: Renaissance
- NRHP reference No.: 72001563 and 78003397
- Added to NRHP: August 21, 1972 (original); August 2, 1978 (decrease)

Buchanan County Courthouse is a historic courthouse located at St. Joseph, Missouri. It was built in 1873, and is a cruciform plan, Renaissance Revival-style brick building. It features pedimented porticos with Corinthian order columns and a glass and tin central dome.

It was first listed on the National Register of Historic Places as Buchanan County Courthouse and Jail in 1972. Its boundaries were decreased in an amendment in 1978 and the NRHP listing was renamed as "Buchanan County Courthouse", apparently excluding the jail.
