= Burnside-Sandusky Gothic House =

Historic house in Missouri, United States

- U.S. National Register of Historic Places
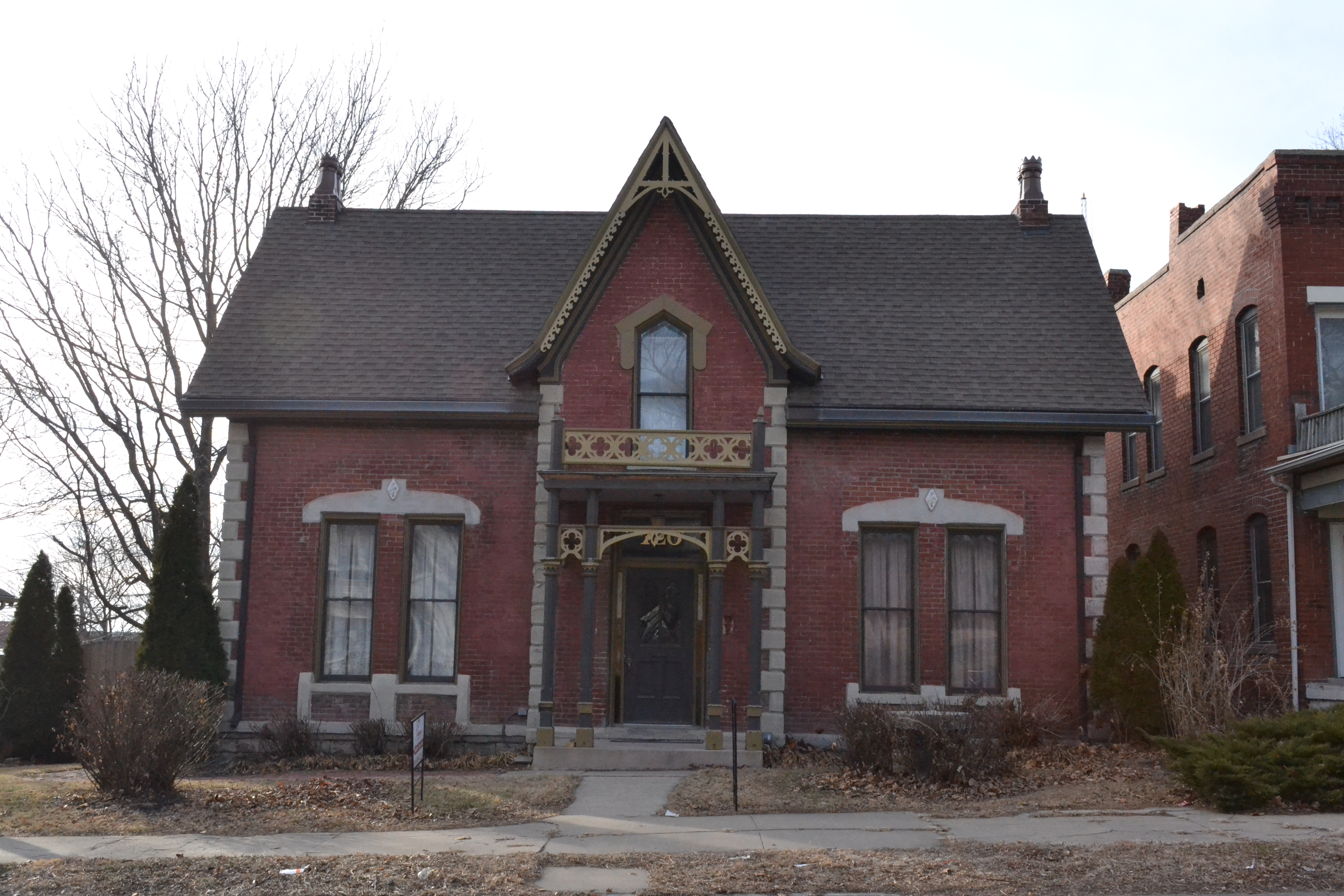

- Location within Missouri Location within the United States
- Location: 720 S. 10th Street, St. Joseph, Missouri
- Coordinates: 39°45′39″N 94°50′53″W
- Area: less than one acre
- Built: 1871
- Architect: Stigers, Lewis
- Architectural style: Gothic
- NRHP reference No.: 04001518
- Added to NRHP: January 19, 2005

The Burnside-Sandusky Gothic House is a historic house located at 720 South 10th Street in St. Joseph, Missouri.

== Description and history ==
It was built in 1871, and is a 1 1/2-story, T-shaped, Gothic Revival style brick cottage. It has a steeply pitched cross-gable roof and a vernacular rear addition.

It was listed on the National Register of Historic Places on January 19, 2005.
