= Everett School (St. Joseph, Missouri) =

- U.S. National Register of Historic Places
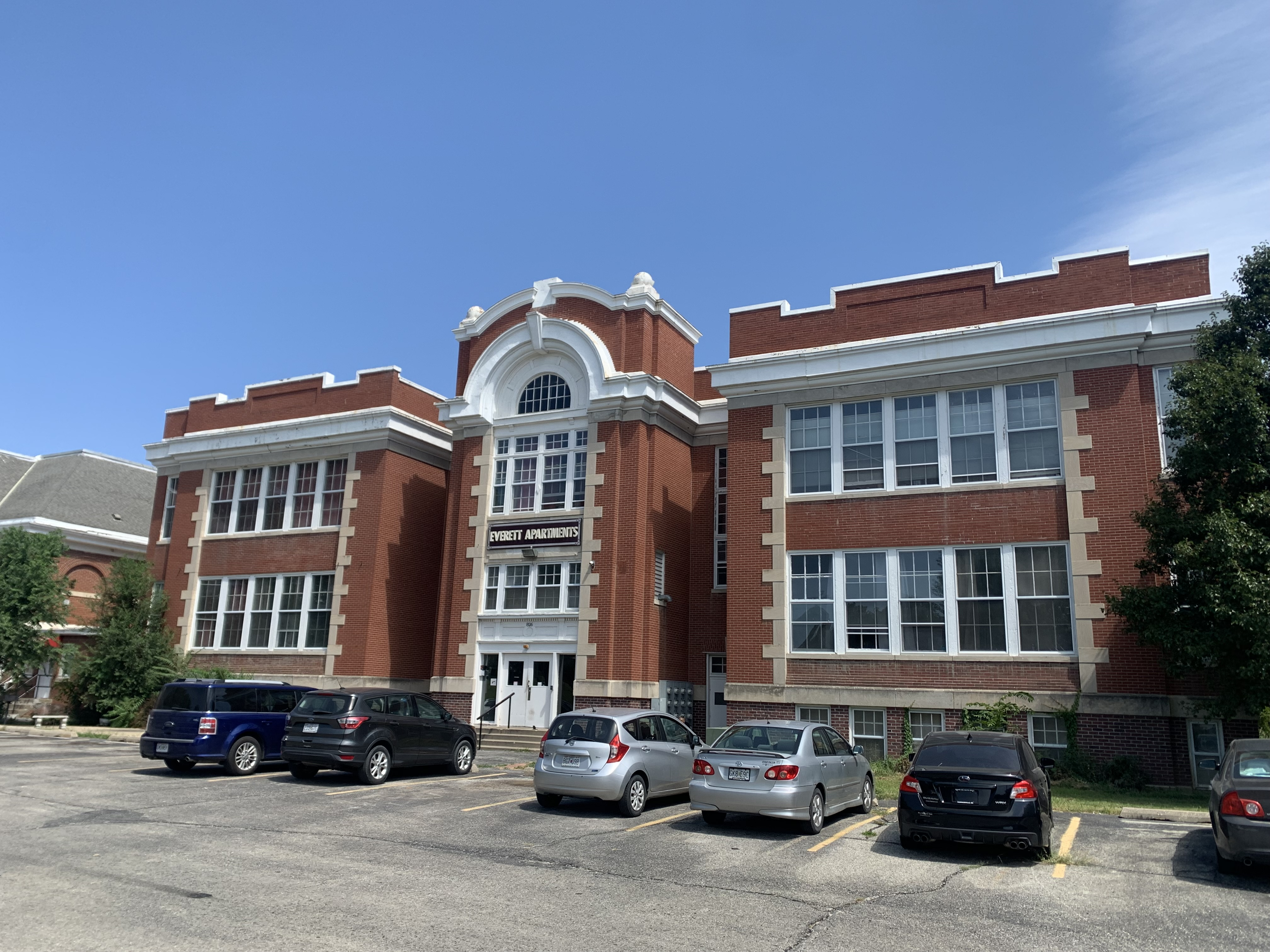
- Everett School building, now Everett Apartments

- Location within Missouri Location within the United States
- Location: 826 S 14th St., St. Joseph, Missouri
- Coordinates: 39°45′34″N 94°50′37″W
- Area: 1.9 acres (0.77 ha)
- Built: 1909
- Architect: Meier, Rudolph; Lehr, James W.
- Architectural style: Colonial Revival
- MPS: St. Joseph, Buchanan County, Missouri MPS AD
- NRHP reference No.: 05001023
- Added to NRHP: September 15, 2005

Everett School, also known as St. Joseph Christian School, is a historic school building located at St. Joseph, Missouri. It was built in 1909, and is a two-story, "E"-plan, Colonial Revival style brick building on a raised basement. It features a crenellated parapet and central bay topped by a large projecting metal arch with prominent keystone. Also on the property are the contributing gymnasium and power plant.

It was listed on the National Register of Historic Places in 2005.
