= Museum Hill Historic District =

Historic district in Missouri, United States

- U.S. National Register of Historic Places
- U.S. Historic district
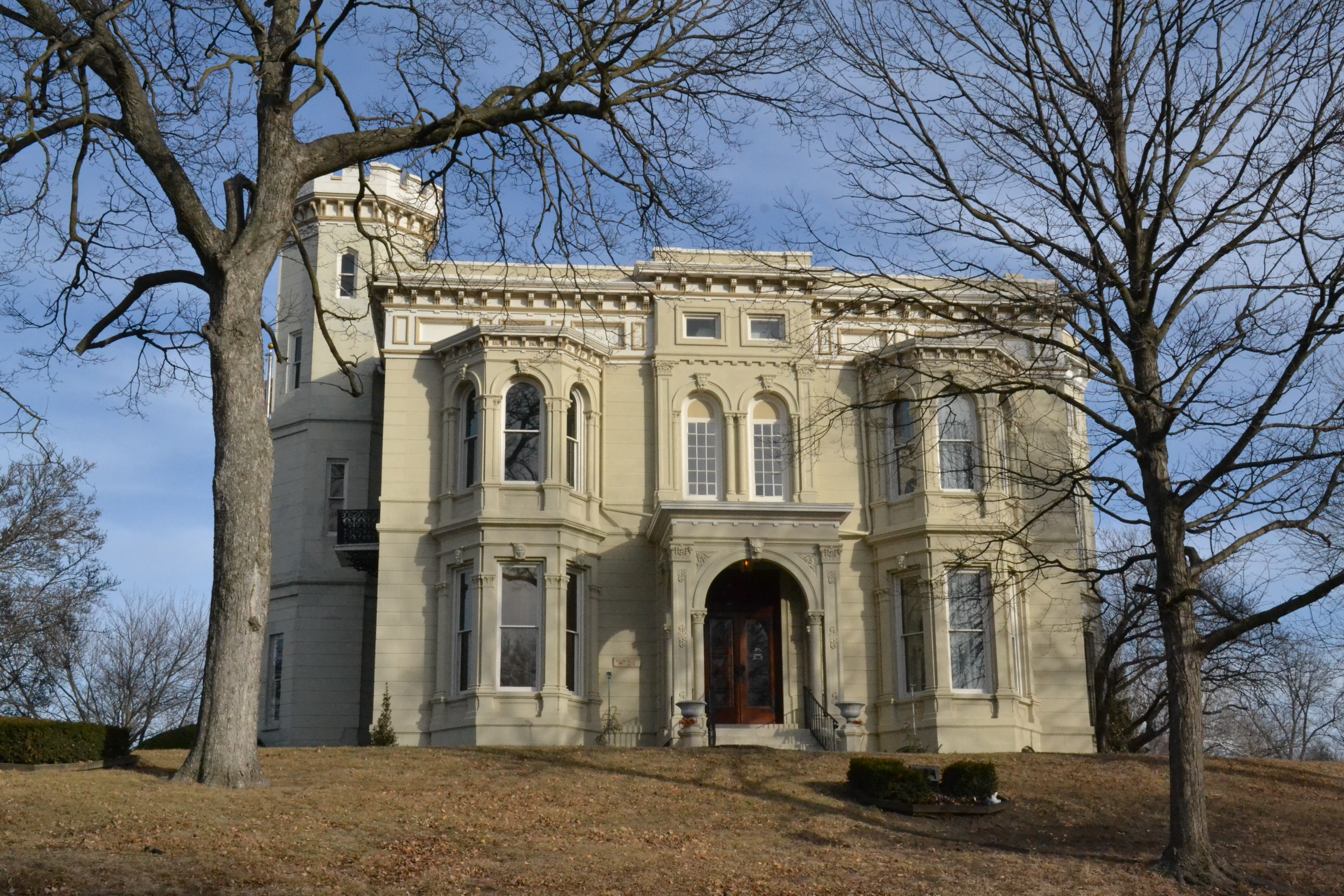
- Tootle Mansion

- Location within Missouri Location within the United States
- Location: Roughly bounded by 9th, Francis, 12th, Jules, 15th and Messanie Sts., 321 and 323 N. 15th and 1510 Faraon St., St. Joseph, Missouri
- Coordinates: 39°45′56″N 94°50′43″W
- Area: 92 acres (37 ha)
- Architect: Multiple
- Architectural style: Bungalow/craftsman, Late Victorian, Tudor Revival, American Foursquare
- MPS: St. Joseph MPS
- NRHP reference No.: 91000112, 09000598 (Boundary Increase)
- Added to NRHP: March 8, 1991, August 5, 2009 (Boundary Increase)

Museum Hill Historic District is a national historic district located at St. Joseph, Missouri. The district encompasses 248 contributing buildings in a predominantly residential section of St. Joseph. It developed between about 1860 and 1942, and includes representative examples of Italianate, Second Empire, Queen Anne, Tudor Revival, American Foursquare, and Bungalow / American Craftsman style architecture. Located in the district is the separately listed Robidoux School. Other notable buildings include the First Congregational Church (1890), Francis Street Methodist Church (1905), First Baptist Church (1896) designed by architect Edmond Jacques Eckel (1845–1934), United Presbyterian Church (1901), First Church of Christ Scientist (1905), First English Evangelical Lutheran Church (1913), and Queen of the Apostles Roman Catholic Church (1908) designed by Eckel.

It was listed on the National Register of Historic Places in 1991 with a boundary increase in 2009.
