= Missouri Valley Trust Company Historic District =

Historic district in Missouri, United States

- U.S. National Register of Historic Places
- U.S. Historic district
- U.S. Historic district – Contributing property
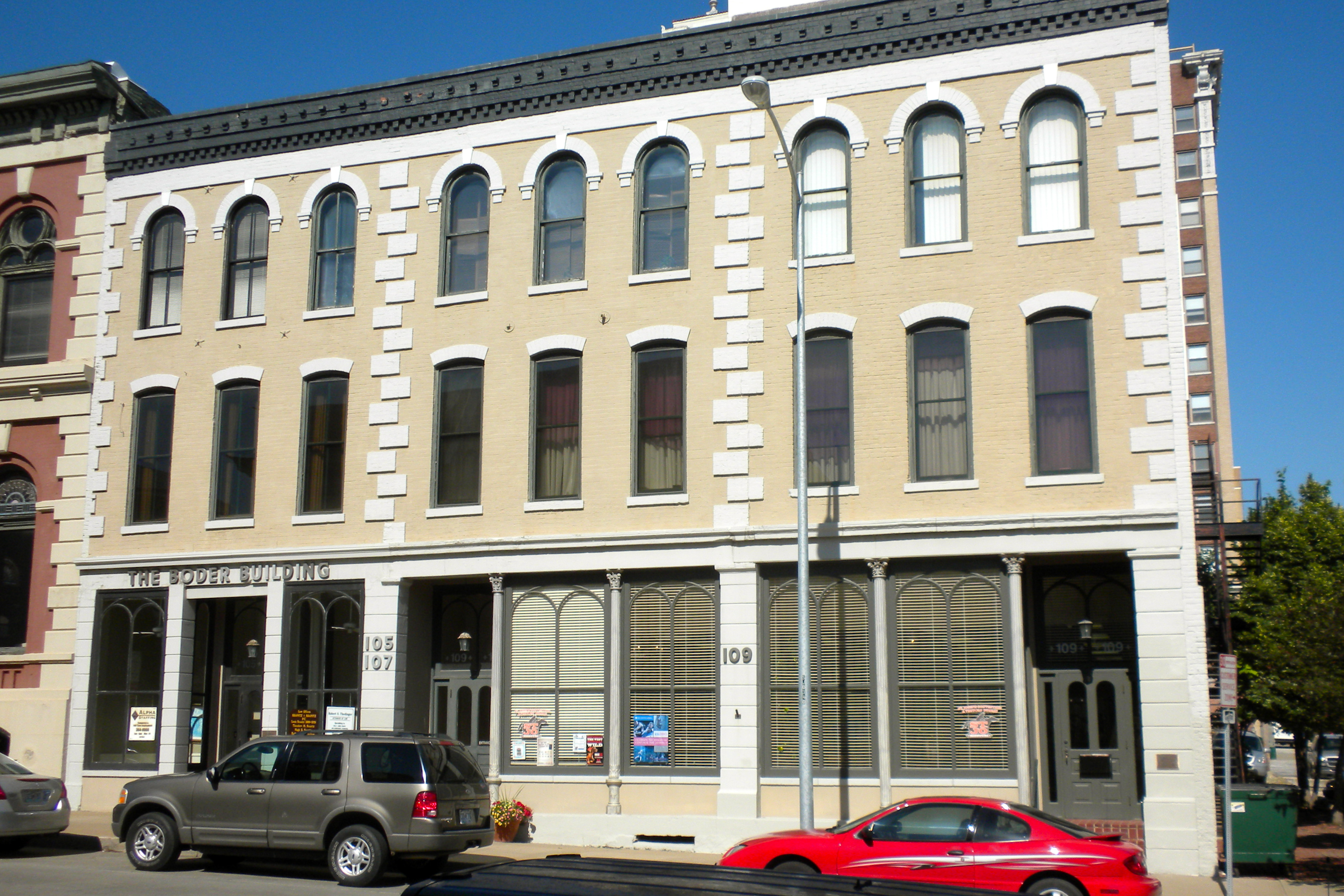
- Missouri Valley Trust Company Historic District, July 2010

- Location within Missouri Location within the United States
- Location: Felix and 4th Sts., St. Joseph, Missouri
- Coordinates: 39°46′0″N 94°51′21″W
- Area: less than one acre
- Built: 1859
- Architect: Pfeiffer Stone Co.
- Architectural style: Renaissance
- NRHP reference No.: 75001063
- Added to NRHP: March 4, 1975

Missouri Valley Trust Company Historic District, formerly known as the Market Square Historic District, is a national historic district located at St. Joseph, Missouri. The district encompasses six contributing buildings in the central business district of St. Joseph. It developed between about 1859 and the 1860s, and includes representative examples of Renaissance Revival style architecture. The primary building is the Bank of the State of Missouri (1859).

It was listed on the National Register of Historic Places in 1975. The district was subsumed under the St. Joseph's Commerce and Banking Historic District.
