= Missouri Theater (St. Joseph, Missouri) =

- U.S. National Register of Historic Places
- U.S. Historic district – Contributing property
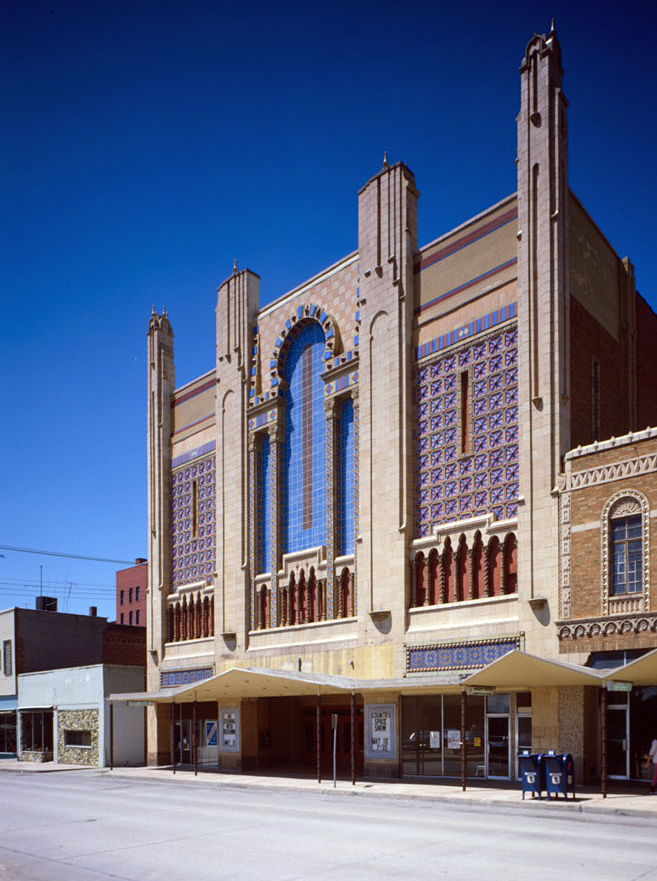
- Missouri Theater, 1986, with 1960s canopy

- Location within Missouri Location within the United States
- Location: 717 Edmond St., St. Joseph, Missouri
- Coordinates: 39°45′58″N 94°51′2″W
- Built: 1927
- Architect: Boller Brothers; W.J. Assenmacher Co.
- Architectural style: Art Deco, Exotic Revival, Moorish revival
- NRHP reference No.: 79001353
- Added to NRHP: October 11, 1979

The Missouri Theater is a theater located in St. Joseph, Missouri. Completed in July 1927, the Missouri Theater was built as a cinema in the atmospheric style, using a combination of Art Deco and Moorish detailing.

The Missouri Theater was designed by noted theater architects Boller Brothers of Kansas City, Missouri, with sculpture by Waylande Gregory. It was constructed by the Capital Building Company of Lincoln, Nebraska for local attorney and promoter Joseph Goldman. The theater has a single balcony that looks over a house designed to resemble an open tented courtyard, decorated with details borrowed from Assyrian and Persian architecture. While the theater was principally designed for movies, it could also be used for live performances, with dressing rooms, a fly loft and an orchestra pit. It also featured a Wurlitzer theater organ.

The Missouri Theater operated as a cinema until 1970. For the next few years it operated as a community theater, and was purchased by a community group in 1976. In 1978 the city of St. Joseph bought the theater for use as a performing arts center. The theater and office building were placed on the National Register of Historic Places in 1979. It is located in the St. Joseph's Commerce and Banking Historic District.

The theater was renovated in 2002. A 1960s canopy was removed and the marquee was restored.

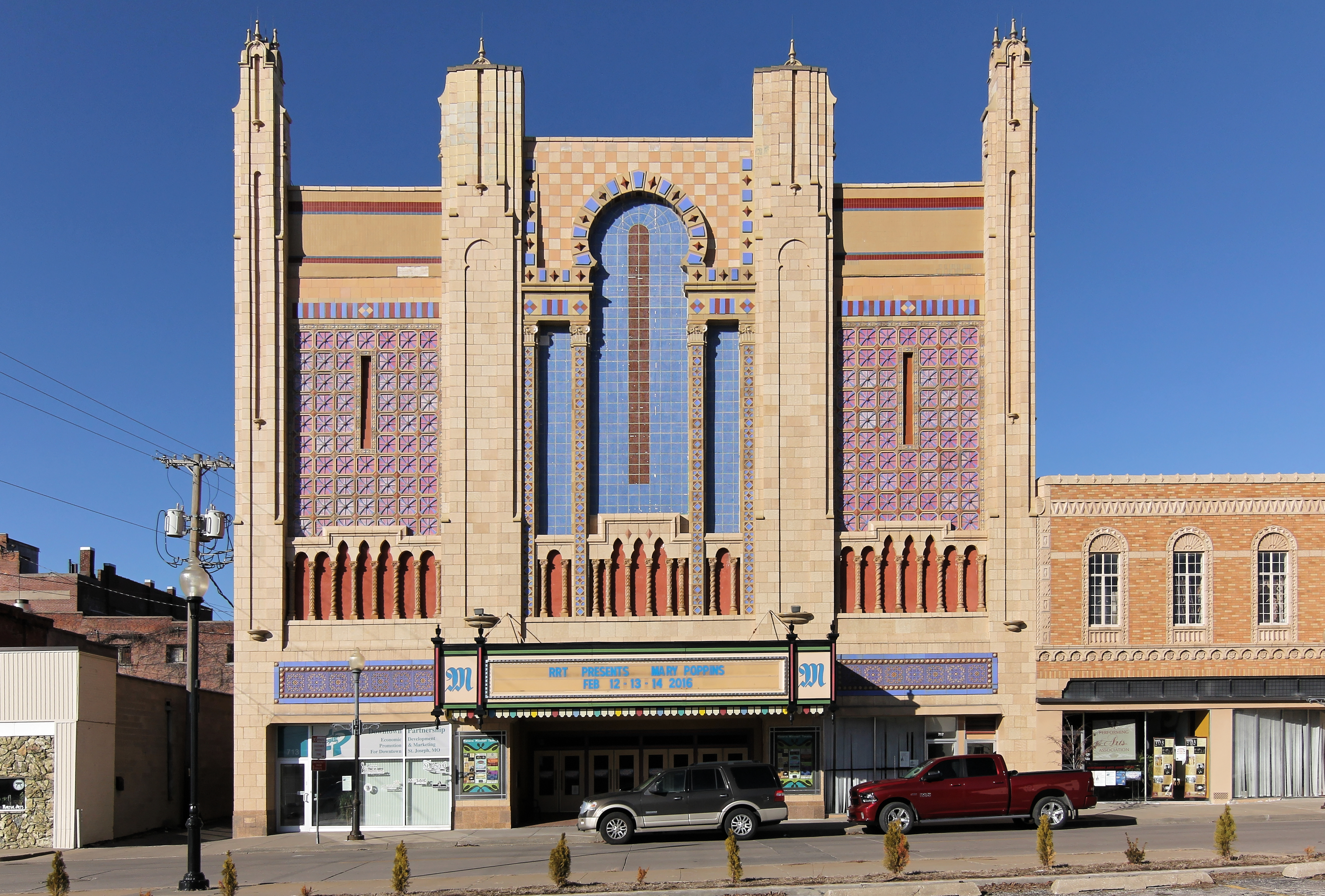
Missouri Theater, Saint Joseph, MO

The Missouri Theater was an inspiration for the Isauro Martinez theater located in Torreón, a city in northern Mexico. This theater began its construction in 1928 and to date still remains in operation.
