= Thompson-Brown-Sandusky House =

Historic house in Missouri, United States

- U.S. National Register of Historic Places
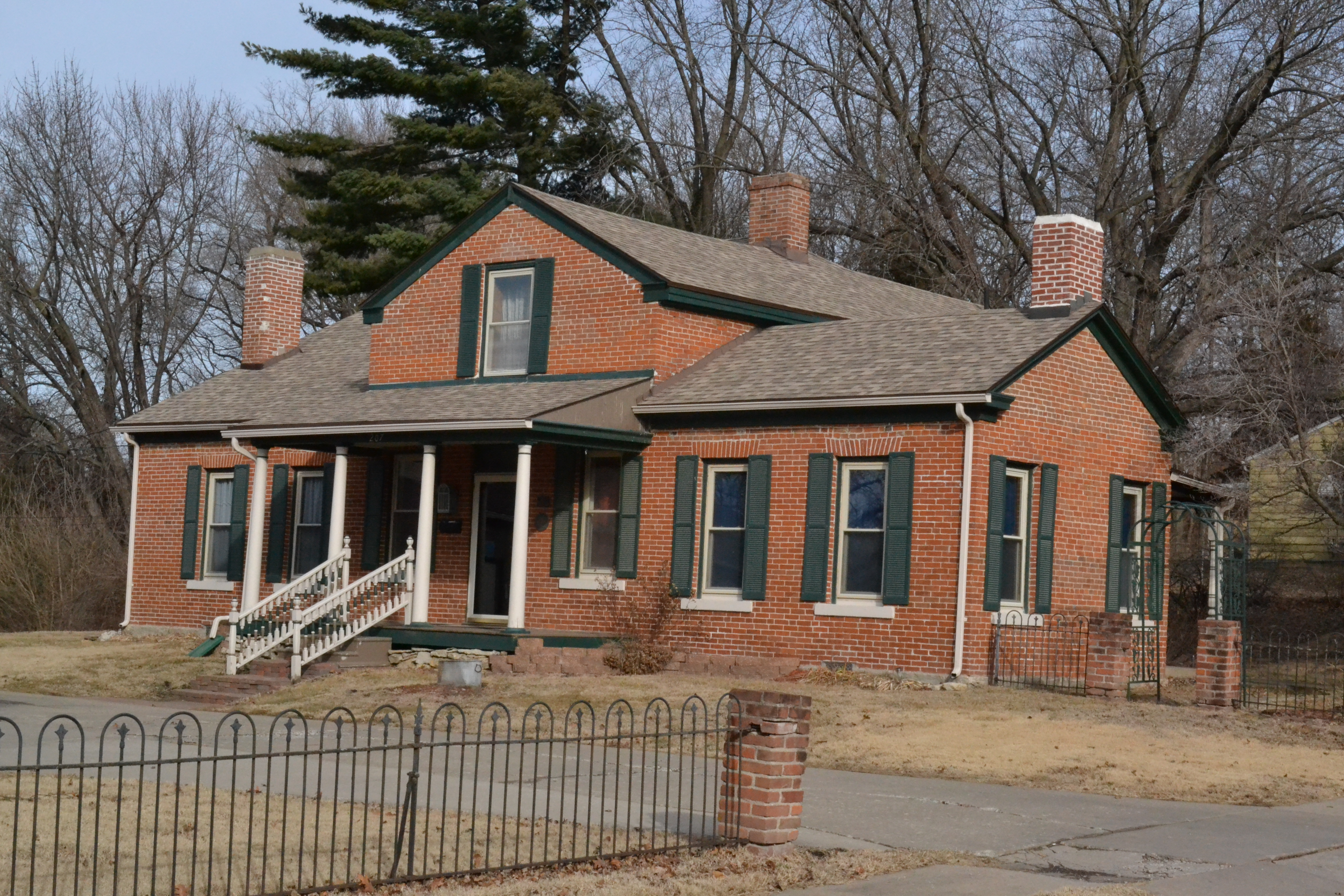

- Location within Missouri Location within the United States
- Location: 207 E. Cliff St., St. Joseph, Missouri
- Coordinates: 39°42′33″N 94°51′36″W
- Area: less than one acre
- Built: c. 1850
- Architectural style: Federal
- NRHP reference No.: 83004297
- Added to NRHP: February 10, 1983

Thompson-Brown-Sandusky House, also known as the Jess Marriott House, is a historic home located at St. Joseph, Missouri. It was built about 1850, and is a 1 1/2-story, Federal style brick dwelling with one-story flanking wings. It has a one-story front porch with Doric order columns.

It was listed on the National Register of Historic Places in 1983.
