= Cathedral Hill Historic District (St. Joseph, Missouri) =

Historic district in Missouri, United States

- U.S. National Register of Historic Places
- U.S. Historic district
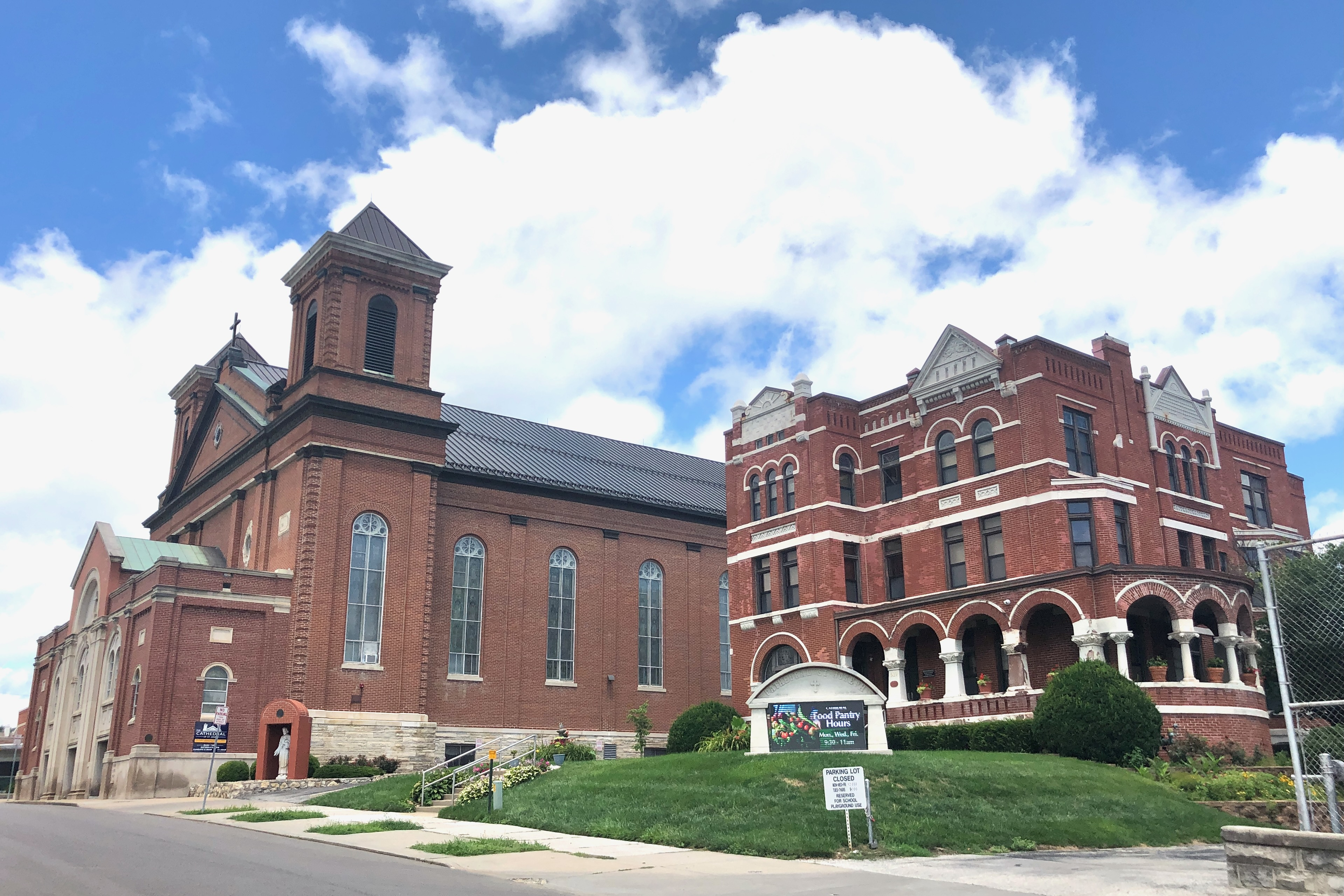
- St. Joseph Cathedral and Rectory

- Location within Missouri Location within the United States
- Location: North 9th St., Powell St. and North 13th St., St. Joseph, Missouri
- Coordinates: 39°46′22″N 94°50′48″W
- Area: 80.2 acres (32.5 ha)
- Architectural style: Greek Revival, Italianate, et al.
- NRHP reference No.: 00000691
- Added to NRHP: June 15, 2000

Cathedral Hill Historic District is a national historic district located at St. Joseph, Missouri. The district encompasses 309 contributing buildings, 1 contributing site, and contributing structures in a predominantly residential section of St. Joseph. It developed between about 1860 and 1950, and includes representative examples of Greek Revival, Italianate, Queen Anne, Colonial Revival, and American Craftsman style architecture. Located in the district is the separately listed Virginia Flats. Other notable buildings include the Nisen Stone House (c. 1885), Thomas Culligan House (c. 1872), A. D. Hudnutt House (1909), St. Joseph Cathedral (1877), James Wall House (c. 1880), Taylor Apartments (c. 1860), E. F. Weitheimer House (1888), Sarah and Ann Walsh Apartment House (1915), Henry Owen Stable (1898), George T. Hoagland Speculative House (1901), and James Hull House (1887).

It was listed on the National Register of Historic Places in 2000.
