= U.S. Route 136 =

U.S. Numbered Highway in the United States

U.S. Route 136
- US 136 highlighted in red

Route information
- Auxiliary route of US 36
- Length: 804 mi (1,294 km)
- Existed: 1951–present

Major junctions
- West end: US 6 / US 34 in Edison, NE
- I-29 at Rock Port, MO; I-35 at Bethany, MO; I-155 near Emden, IL; I-55 at McLean, IL; I-74 near Le Roy, IL; I-57 at Rantoul, IL
- East end: I-74 / I-465 in Speedway, IN

Location
- Country: United States
- States: Nebraska; Missouri; Iowa; Illinois; Indiana

Highway system
- United States Numbered Highway System; List; Special; Divided

U.S. Route 136 is an east–west U.S. highway that is a spur route of U.S. Route 36. It runs from Edison, Nebraska, at US 6 and US 34 to the I-74/I-465 interchange in Speedway, Indiana. This is a distance of 804 miles (1,294 km). Due to the removal of almost every numbered route in Indianapolis, US 136 never meets its parent, US 36; however, it does come within two miles of it at its interchange with I-465/I-74 at its eastern terminus.

== Route description ==
=== Nebraska ===
U.S. 136 closely parallels Nebraska's southern border from its western terminus near Edison to the Missouri River. It passes through Beatrice and exits the state at Brownville via the Brownville Bridge. It is designated the Heritage Highway throughout Nebraska.

=== Missouri ===
US 136 enters Missouri on the west just east of Brownville, Nebraska, over the Missouri River. It leaves the state at Alexandria on the east, running concurrently with US 61. During its journey, it enters every county seat in the nine counties it traverses. The distance across Missouri is approximately 257 miles (414 km). US 136 is two lanes over its entire course through Missouri.

=== Iowa ===
US 136 in Iowa consists of a 3.6-mile-long (5.8 km) route which travels across the south-easternmost tip of Lee County. It crosses the Des Moines River from Missouri with US 61, overlapping for just over 1 mile (1.6 km). East of the US 61 split, US 136 is overlapped by US 61 Bus. through Keokuk. US 136 enters Keokuk along 7th Street, which takes a turn to the northeast towards downtown. At the intersection with Main Street, which is the southern end of US 218, it turns to the southeast towards the Mississippi River. US 136 travels another 2/3 mile (1.1 km) before crossing the Mississippi into Hamilton, Illinois via the Keokuk–Hamilton Bridge.

=== Illinois ===
US 136 spends 225.95 miles (363.63 km) within the state of Illinois. It crosses the Mississippi River into Illinois from Iowa just past Keokuk. It passes through historic Carthage; site of the death of Joseph Smith, founder of the Latter Day Saint movement and home of the Kibbe biological museum, then Macomb, where Western Illinois University is located. It continues as an east–west route intersecting with I-155 and I-55 south of Bloomington-Normal and north of Lincoln in Central Illinois. It later intersects with I-74, and then I-57 just outside Rantoul, approximately 15 miles (24 km) north of Champaign-Urbana. US 136 then travels concurrently with Illinois Route 1 in far east central Illinois before entering Danville. At Danville, it turns east as it passes into Indiana.

=== Indiana ===
Through most of its duration in Indiana, US 136 is parallel to the newer I-74. Within Indianapolis, the highway is also called Crawfordsville Road, and US 136 ends in the town of Speedway, at the I-74/I-465 interchange, where Crawfordsville Road continues without numbered designation. As part of Indiana's Accelerate 465 project, the I-74/I-465 interchange was reworked to eliminate tight spiral ramps and to add a full interchange for US 136 with I-465. It was completed in December 2012. The entire portion of US 136 in Indiana is part of the Dixie Highway.

== History ==
In Illinois, the designation of US 136 in 1951 replaced IL 10 from the Iowa state line in Keokuk to IL 119 in Havana, The route then followed IL 119 to an intersection with IL 1, where it traveled south to IL 10, heading east to Danville and the Indiana state line.

In Missouri, most of US 136 was designated as Route 4 in 1922. This highway began at St. Joseph and followed present US 169 to Stanberry, turning east there to the Iowa state line along US 136. The rest of US 136 was initially Route 1A (Nebraska to Rock Port), part of Route 1, and Route 18 (Tarkio to Stanberry). The east end was truncated to Wayland in 1926, when US 61 was designated over the part east to Iowa, and in 1927 Route 4 absorbed the former Route 52 from St. Joseph southwest to Atchison, Kansas. In 1932, Route 4 was rerouted west of Stanberry, absorbing Route 18 and Route 102 (the latter a ca. 1930 renumbering of Route 1A); the portion from Stanberry to St. Joseph was deleted in favor of US 169 and the portion from St. Joseph to Kansas became Route 18 (which became part of US 59 in 1934). US 136 replaced Route 4 east of Stanberry in 1951 and the rest in 1960.

In Nebraska, US 136 was previously "Route 3." US 136 replaced Route 3 in 1960.

US 136 was originally proposed to use I-465 in Indiana to the US 36 interchange so US 136 could meet its parent, US 36.

== Major intersections ==
Nebraska
US 6 / US 34 north-northwest of Edison
US 183 north-northwest of Alma. The highways travel concurrently to Alma.
US 281 in Red Cloud
US 81 south-southeast of Hebron
US 77 in Beatrice
US 75 in Auburn
Missouri
I-29 in Rock Port
US 275 northwest of Rock Port
US 59 south-southwest of Tarkio. The highways travel concurrently to Tarkio.
US 71 east-southeast of Burlington Junction. The highways travel concurrently to Maryville.
US 169 in Stanberry. The highways travel concurrently to north-northwest of Darlington.
US 69 southwest of Bethany. The highways travel concurrently to Bethany.
I-35 in Bethany
US 65 in Princeton. The highways travel concurrently through Princeton.
US 63 south-southeast of Glenwood. The highways travel concurrently to Lancaster.
US 61 west-northwest of Alexandria. The highways travel concurrently to Keokuk, Iowa.
Iowa
US 218 in Keokuk
Illinois
US 67 in Macomb. The highways travel concurrently to east of Macomb.
US 24 in Duncan Mills. The highways travel concurrently to south of Duncan Mills.
I-155 east-northeast of Emden
I-55 in McLean
US 51 in Heyworth
I-74 south-southeast of Le Roy
US 150 southeast of Le Roy
I-57 in Rantoul
US 45 in Rantoul
US 150 in Danville
Indiana
US 41 in Veedersburg. The highways travel concurrently through Veedersburg.
US 231 in Crawfordsville
I-74 / I-465 on the Indianapolis–Speedway line.

== Business routes ==
=== Albany, Missouri ===
U.S. Route 136 Business
- Location: Gentry County, Missouri
- Length: 1.7 mi (2.7 km)
- Existed: 2006–present

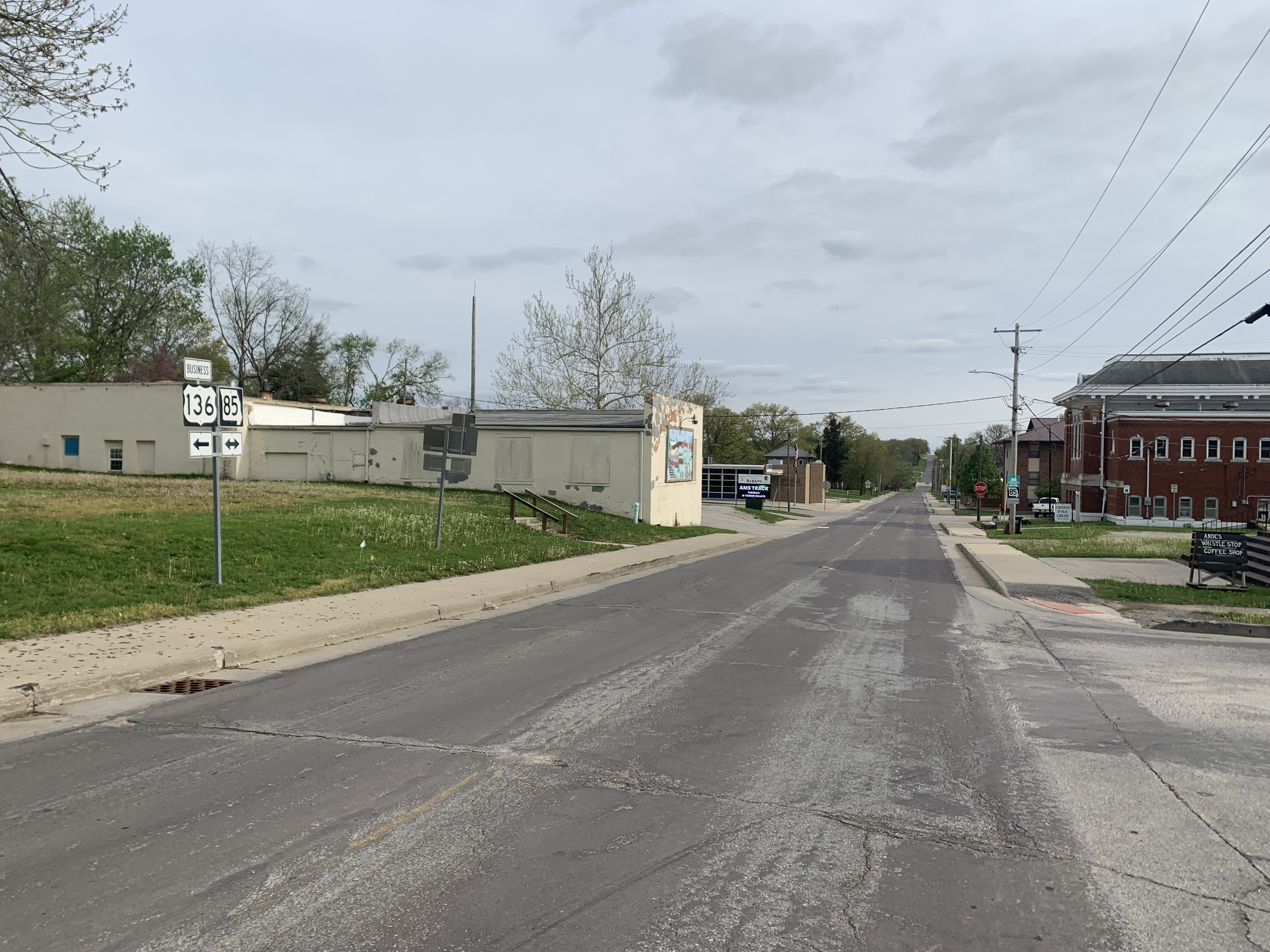
South on US 136 Bus. / Missouri Route 85 (North Hundley St) at the junction of US 136 Bus. and Route 85 in Albany, Missouri April 2025

U.S. Route 136 Business (US 136 Bus.) is a business loop of US 136 that runs through the city of Albany, Missouri.

US 136 Bus. begins at a T intersection with US 136, immediately west of Albany. From its western terminus it proceeds east to promptly enter Albany and run along West Jackson Street. After about 1.2 miles (1.9 km) US 136 Bus. reaches its western junction with Missouri Route 85 (Route 85) at a T intersection at Hundley Street. US 136 Bus. turns north to run concurrent with Route 85 along North Hundley Street. (Route 85 heads south along South Hundley Street toward Evona.) After proceeding north for one-half of a mile (0.80 km) US 136 Bus. reaches it eastern junction at US 136. (Route 85 ends at that intersection, but the roadway continues north as Missouri Route C.)

Major intersections

The entire route is in Gentry County.

Location	mi	km	Destinations	Notes
	0.0	0.0	US 136 east – Albany, US 136 Bus. US 136 west – Stanberry, Maryville, Rock Port	Western terminus; T intersection
Albany	1.2	1.9	Route 85 south (South Hundley St)	T intersection; eastern end of Route 85 concurrency
Albany	1.7	2.7	US 136 east – Albany, New Hampton, Bethany, Princeton US 136 west – US 136 Bus. Route 85 end	Northern terminus; northern end of Route 85 concurrency
Albany	1.7	2.7	Route C north – Pinhook, Allendale	Continuation north from eastern terminus; southern end of Route C
1.000 mi = 1.609 km; 1.000 km = 0.621 mi: Concurrency terminus

== See also ==
- List of United States Numbered Highways
- Illinois Route 336

Browse numbered routes
← N-133	NE	→ N-137
← Route 135	MO	→ Route 137
← Iowa 130	IA	→ Iowa 136
← IL 135	IL	→ IL 136
← SR 135	IN	→ SR 140
