= Senator Murray =

Senator Murray may refer to:

== Australia ==
- Andrew Murray (Australian politician) (born 1947), Senator for Western Australia (1996–2008)
- Reg Murray (1909–1962), Senator for Tasmania (1947–1951)
- Murray Watt (1973-), Senator for Queensland (2016-)

== Scotland ==
- John Murray, Lord Murray (1778–1859), Senator of the College of Justice

== United States ==
Members of the U.S. Senate

- James E. Murray (1876–1961), senator from Montana (1934–1961)
- Patty Murray (1950–), senator from Washington (1992–)

United States state senate members

- Ed Murray (Washington politician) (born 1955), Washington State Senate
- Edwin R. Murray (born 1960), Louisiana State Senate
- Florence K. Murray (1916–2004), Rhode Island State Senate
- John S. Murray (Iowa politician) (born 1939), Iowa State Senate
- John S. Murray (Washington politician) (1925–2007), Washington State Senate
- Kevin Murray (politician) (born 1960), California State Senate
- L. Dean Murray (born 1964), New York State Senate
- Martin L. Murray (1909–1990), Pennsylvania State Senate
- Melissa Murray (politician) (born 1974), Rhode Island State Senate
- Milton T. Murray (1898–1991), Wisconsin State Senate
- Robert Murray (Maine politician) (born 1959), Maine State Senate
- Therese Murray (born 1947), Massachusetts State Senate
- William J. Murray (politician) (1884–1966), New York State Senate
- William Pitt Murray (1825–1910), Minnesota State Senate

== See also ==
- Murray (surname)
