= Spoilt vote =

Invalid ballot that is not counted

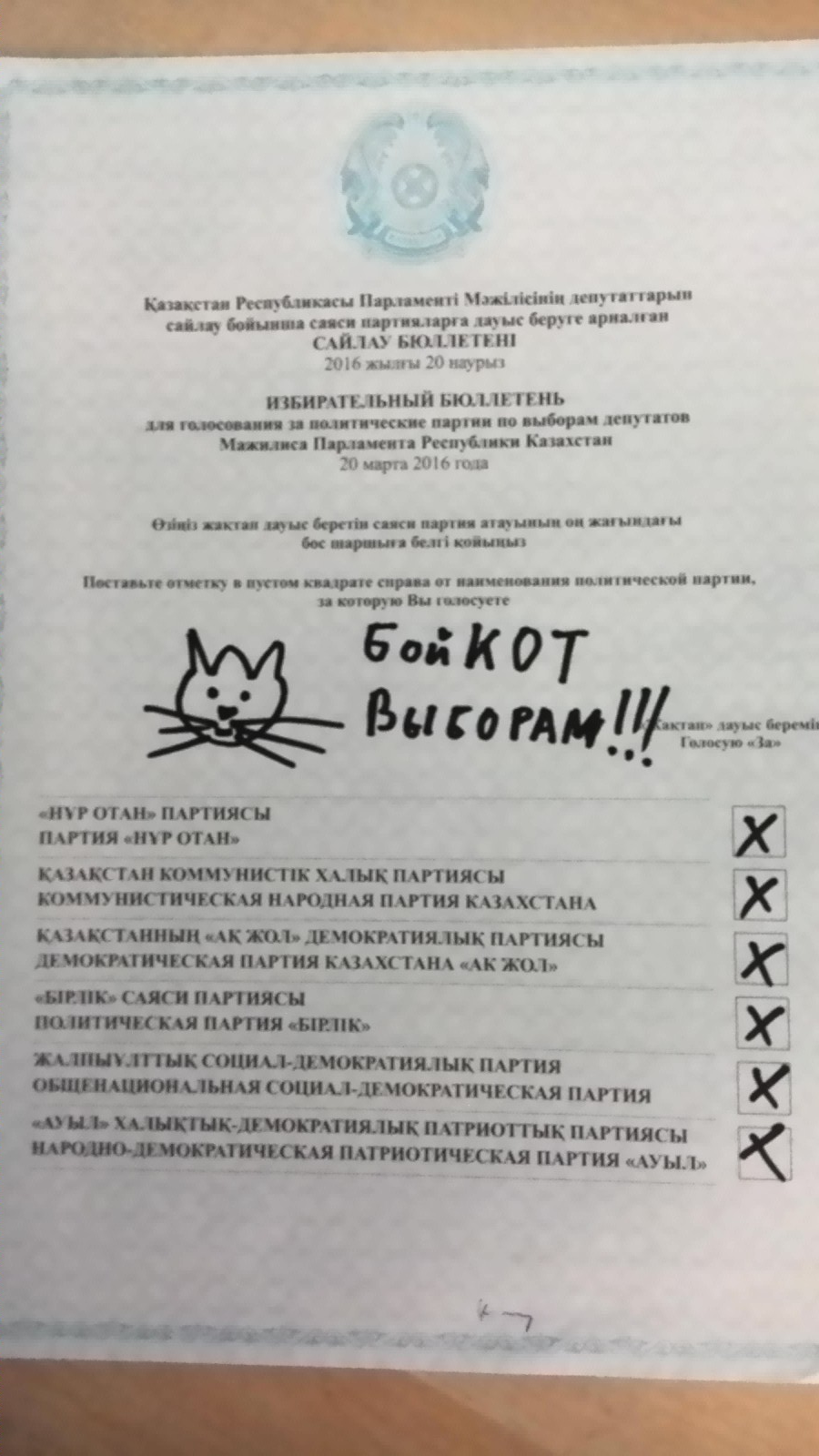
Spoilt ballot paper from the 2016 Kazakh legislative election reading "Бойкот Выборам" which means Boycott the elections.

In voting, a ballot is not included in the vote count if a law declares or an election authority determines that it is spoilt (chiefly British), spoiled (chiefly American), void, null, informal, invalid, rejected or stray. This may occur accidentally or deliberately.

The total number of spoilt votes in a United States election has been called the residual vote.

In some jurisdictions, spoilt votes are counted and reported.

== Types of spoilt vote ==
A ballot may be spoilt in a number of ways, including:

- Failing to mark the ballot at all (blank vote), or otherwise defacing the ballot instead of attempting to vote.
- Filling out the ballot in a manner that is incompatible with the voting system being used, e.g.:
  - Marking more choices than permitted (overvoting), or fewer than necessary (undervoting).
  - Filling a preference ballot out of sequence, e.g. 1-2-2-3-4 or 1-2-4-5-6, 1-4-2-4-5. In most cases, only the first two choices in these examples would be counted as valid.
  - Adding a write-in candidate when such an option is not permitted. The vote for this candidate would be discarded.
- Filling the ballot in a manner that makes the voter's decision unclear.
- Physically deforming ballots, especially those counted by machine.
- Making marks on the ballot other than those necessary to complete it, from which the voter's identity can be ascertained, compromising the secrecy of the ballot.

As an example, UK law specifically precludes ballots "on which votes are given for more candidates than the voter is entitled to vote for", "on which anything is written or marked by which the voter can be identified" or "which [are] unmarked or void for uncertainty".

== Replacement ballots ==
If a voter makes a mistake while completing a ballot, it may be possible to cancel it and start the voting process again. In the United States, cancelled physical ballots may be called "spoiled ballots", as distinct from an "invalid vote" which has been cast.

In Canada, a spoiled ballot is one that has been handled by an elector in such a manner that it is ruined beyond use, or that the deputy returning officer finds soiled or improperly printed. The spoilt ballot is not placed in the ballot box, but rather is marked as spoilt by the deputy returning officer and set aside. The elector is given another ballot. A 'rejected ballot' is one which cannot be counted due to improper marking by the voter. Examples of this are ballots which have more than one mark, the intent of the voter cannot be ascertained, or the voter can be identified by their mark.

In many jurisdictions, if multiple elections or referendums are held simultaneously, then there may be separate physical ballots for each, which may be printed on different-colored paper and posted into separate ballot boxes. In the United States, a single physical ballot is often used to record multiple separate votes. In such cases one can distinguish an "invalid ballot", where all votes on the ballot are rendered invalid, from a "partially valid" ballot, with some votes are valid and others invalid.

== Intentional spoiling ==
A voter may deliberately spoil a vote, for example as a protest vote, especially in compulsory voting jurisdictions, to show disapproval of the candidates standing whilst still taking part in the electoral process. Protest votes have been associated with nomination rules preventing a candidate from standing on the ballot, political alienation or low political trust. Spoilt votes can be explained as a form of strategic voting due to the violation of the independence of irrelevant alternatives property of an electoral system.

A None of the above option on the ballot was shown to reduce spoilt votes. The Supreme Court of India mandated 2013 in India the "None of the above" option.

The validity of an election may be questioned if there is an unusually high proportion of spoilt votes.

In multiple-vote U.S. ballots, voter rolloff is calculated by subtracting the number of votes cast for a "down-ballot" office, such as mayor, from the number of votes cast for a "top-of-the-ballot" office, such as president. When the election jurisdiction does not report voter turnout, roll-off can be used as a proxy for residual votes. Some voters may only be interested in voting for the major offices, and not bother filling in the lower positions, resulting in a partially valid ballot.

While it is not illegal to advocate informal voting in Australian federal elections, it was briefly illegal to advise voters to fill out their ballots using duplicated numbers. Albert Langer was jailed for violating an injunction not to advocate incomplete preference voting for the 1996 Australian federal election.

During the 2021 Hong Kong legislative elections, pro-democratic supporters urged voters to cast spoilt ballots or not vote in the election in protest of the rewriting of election rules by the National People's Congress in Beijing. Despite the government criminalising inciting voters to cast invalid ballots or not vote, as well as attempts to boost voter turnout, the election recorded a record number of invalid ballots as well as historically low voter turnout.

Intentionally spoiling someone else's ballot before or during tabulation is considered electoral fraud.

== Unintentional spoiling ==
Voter instructions are usually intended to minimize the accidental spoiling of votes. Ballot design can aid or inhibit clarity in an election, resulting in less or more accidental spoiling. Some election officials have discretion to allow ballots where the criteria for acceptability are not strictly met but the voter's intention is clear. More complicated electoral systems may be more prone to errors. Group voting tickets were introduced in Australia owing to the high number of informal votes cast in single transferable vote (STV) elections, but have since been abolished. When multiple Irish STV elections are simultaneous (as for local and European elections) some voters have marked, say, 1-2-3 on one ballot paper and 4-5-6 on the other; some returning officers consequently allowed 4-5-6 ballots to be counted, until a Supreme Court case in 2015 ruled they were invalid.

The United States Election Assistance Commission's survey of the 2006 midterm elections reported undervoting rate of 0.1% in US Senate elections and 1.6% in US House elections; overvotes were much rarer. Some paper-based voting systems and most DRE voting machines can notify voters of under-votes and over-votes. The Help America Vote Act requires that voters are informed when they have overvoted, unless a paper-ballot voting system is in use.

In the Philippines, votes cast for aspirants later declared as nuisance candidates whose name managed to get printed in ballots were considered stray votes prior to the 2013 elections. A particular type of nuisance candidates runs "to cause confusion among the voters by the similarity of the names" with a bona fide candidate for the same office. Since the 2013 elections, votes for these class of nuisance candidates are transferred to their namesake bona fide candidate as valid votes.

== See also ==
- Election boycott
- Ballot design in the Single Transferable Vote: discusses exhausted votes, which cannot be transferred owing to too few preferences being expressed
- Nonviolent resistance
- Noon Against Putin
- Refused ballot
- Sham election
- Wasted vote
