= Alice Chenoweth =

Alice Chenoweth may refer to:

- Helen H. Gardener (1853–1925), American author, activist and civil servant, born Alice Chenoweth
- Alice Drew Chenoweth (1903–1998), physician
