= Albany Carnegie Library =

Albany Carnegie Library may refer to:

- Carnegie Library of Albany (Albany, Georgia)
- Carnegie Library of Albany (Albany, Missouri)
- Carnegie Library of Albany (Albany, Oregon) (List of Carnegie libraries in Oregon)
