= St. Louis Public Library =

Library system in Missouri, US

Coordinates: 38.6307°N 90.1995°W

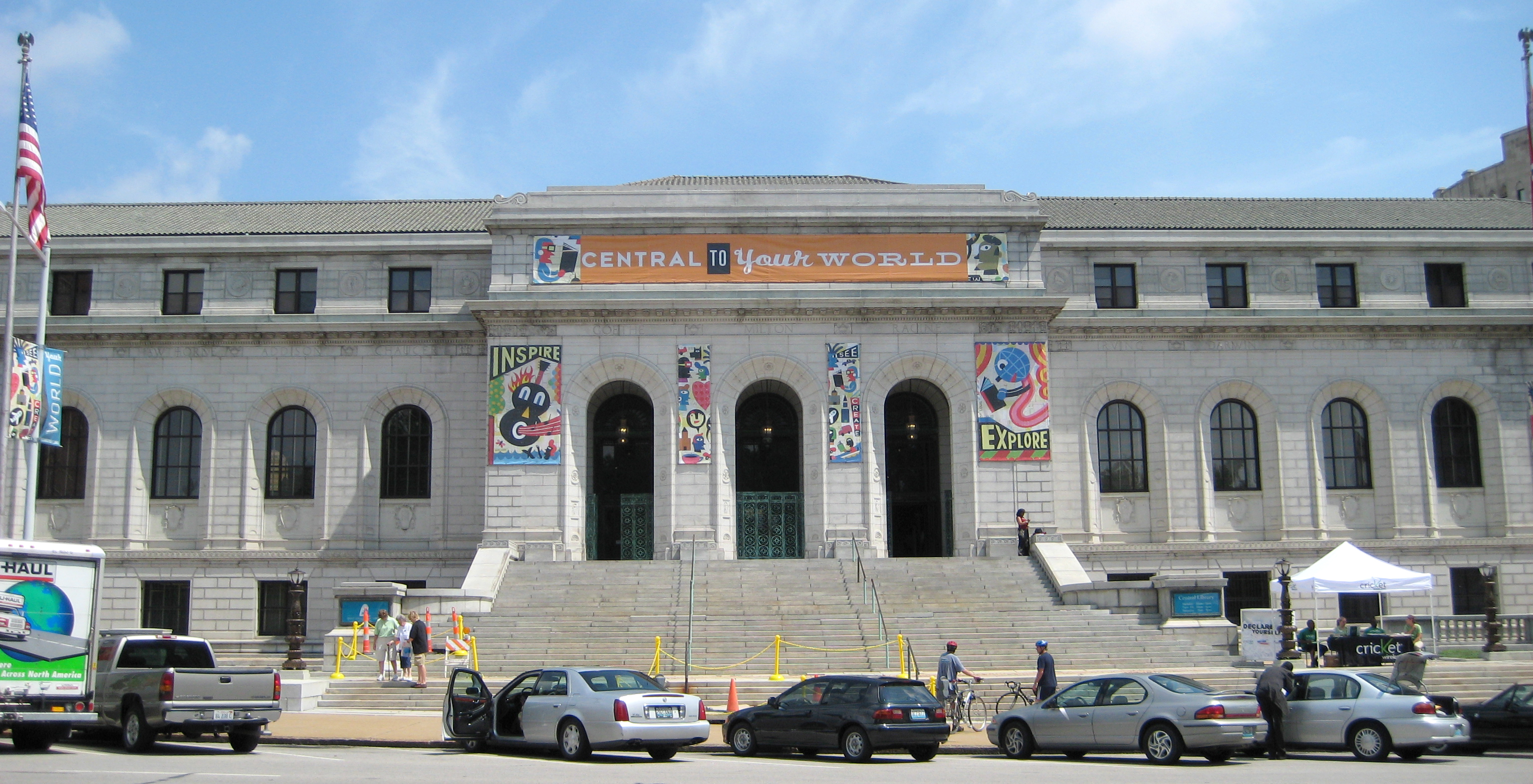
- The Central Library
- Location: St. Louis, Missouri, United States
- Type: Public library
- Established: 1865
- Branches: 15

Collection
- Size: 4.6 million

Access and use
- Circulation: 2.3 million
- Population served: 1.7 million
- Members: 135,000

Other information
- Budget: $22.2 million
- Director: Waller McGuire
- Employees: 350
- Website: http://www.slpl.org

The St. Louis Public Library is a municipal public library system in the city of St. Louis, Missouri. It operates fifteen locations, including the main Central Library location.

== History ==
In 1865, Ira Divoll, the superintendent of the St. Louis Public School system, created a subscription library in the public school library that would later evolve into the St. Louis Public Library. Divoll believed that a library should work in tandem with the public education system and offer citizens an opportunity for self-improvement and culture.

In 1869, Divoll's subscription library moved to the Board of Education building. The library consisted of 4 staff members who offered reference services 12 hours a day. The library also encouraged children to visit, and had no age restrictions as did most libraries of the day.

Due to rapid growth of the collection, which grew from 1,500 volumes in 1865 to 90,000 volumes by 1893, the library required more space. In 1893, the library moved into a new space on the top floors of the new Board of Education building. Also in 1893, the citizens of St. Louis voted to move the administration of the library to an independent board, supported by a property tax. This vote enabled the library to operate without subscription fees and be open to all St. Louis residents.

The library occupied its space in the Board of Education building until 1909, as the Central Library was being constructed. The Board of Education building wasn't large enough to accommodate the library's growing collection. It was during this time that the library began its role as a lending library, allowing the public to ‘check out’ and take books home.

In 1901, Andrew Carnegie donated $1,000,000 for the construction of six library locations: Central, Barr, Cabanne, Carondelet, Soulard, Divoll, and Carpenter. Of these six, all but Soulard and Divoll are still operating in their original locations. By this time the collection included 90,000 books. The Central Library, the system's main Carnegie library, was designed by Cass Gilbert, who won an architectural design competition in 1907; it was dedicated in 1912. By 1938 the collection included 900,000 items, and by 2014, 4.6 million items.

== Branches ==
Branch (Location)	Address
Central Library	1301 Olive St.
Baden Library	8448 Church Rd.
Barr Library	1701 S. Jefferson Ave.
Buder Regional Library	4401 Hampton Ave.
Cabanne Library	1106 Union Blvd.
Carondelet Library	6800 Michigan Ave.
Carpenter Regional Library	3309 S. Grand Blvd.
Charing Cross Library	356 N. Skinker Blvd.
Divoll Library	4234 N. Grand Blvd.
Julia Davis Regional Library	4415 Natural Bridge Ave.
Kingshighway Library	2260 S. Vandeventer Ave.
Machacek Library	6424 Scanlan Ave.
Marketplace Library	6548 Manchester Ave.
Schlafly Regional Library	225 N. Euclid Ave.
Walnut Park Library	5760 W. Florissant Ave.

== Services ==
- Audio-Visual material including DVDs, Blu-Rays, books on CD, Playaways, music CDs
- Children's sections
- Computer visitor passes
- Computers with high speed internet, printing, word processing capabilities
- Creative experience digital makerspace
- Digital services (Libby, Hoopla, Freegal Music)
- Interlibrary loan (ILL)
- Launchpads (tablets for checkout that feature apps for children with an educational theme)
- Neighborhood specific material
- Notary services
- Passport processing
- Periodicals & nationwide/worldwide newspapers
- Reference services
- Programs, special events, and author visits/book signings
- Video games (PS4, PS5, Wii, Wii U, Nintendo Switch, Xbox One, Xbox 360, Xbox Series X/S)
- Voter registration

== See also ==
- List of Carnegie libraries in Missouri
- Frederick M. Crunden
