= Joel Pritchard =

14th Lieutenant Governor of Washington

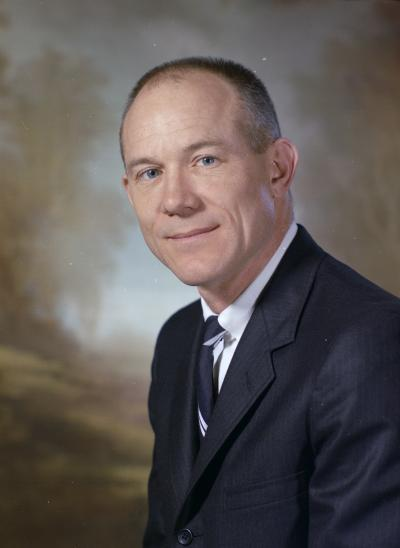

14th Lieutenant Governor of Washington
- In office January 11, 1989 – January 15, 1997
- Governor: Booth Gardner; Mike Lowry
- Preceded by: John Cherberg
- Succeeded by: Brad Owen

Member of the U.S. House of Representatives from Washington's 1st district
- In office January 3, 1973 – January 3, 1985
- Preceded by: Thomas Pelly
- Succeeded by: John Miller

Member of the Washington Senate from the 36th district
- In office January 9, 1967 – January 11, 1971
- Preceded by: Charles Moriarty
- Succeeded by: John Murray

Member of the Washington House of Representatives from the 36th district
- In office January 12, 1959 – January 9, 1967
- Preceded by: Gladys Kirk
- Succeeded by: John Murray

Personal details
- Born: Joel McFee Pritchard; May 5, 1925 Seattle, Washington, U.S.
- Died: October 9, 1997 (aged 72) Olympia, Washington, U.S.
- Party: Republican
- Spouse: Joan Sutton
- Children: 4
- Education: Marietta College

Military service
- Allegiance: United States
- Branch/service: United States Army
- Years of service: 1944–1946
- Rank: Sergeant
- Battles/wars: World War II

Joel McFee Pritchard (May 5, 1925 – October 9, 1997) was an American businessman and politician who served in the U.S. House of Representatives and as the 14th lieutenant governor of Washington as a member of the Republican Party, and is the most recent Republican to have held the office.

Pritchard, known as the Father of Pickleball, invented the sport, along with two friends, in 1965. He was inducted into the Pickleball Hall of Fame in 2017.

== Political career ==
Pritchard was a delegate to the Republican National Convention in 1956 that renominated Dwight D. Eisenhower for the presidency.

He was elected to the Washington House of Representatives representing Washington's thirty-sixth district in 1958, where he served from 1959 to 1967, being reelected in 1960, 1962 and 1964. In the state house, he worked closely with future U.S. Senators Daniel J. Evans and Slade Gorton.

In 1966, he was elected to the Washington State Senate, where he served a single term from 1967 to 1971. In 1970 Pritchard, a member of Washington Citizens for Abortion Reform (WCAR), introduced a bill allowing abortions in the first four months of pregnancy; it was approved and went to the voters as Referendum 20. The measure was approved statewide by voters in November 1970, making Washington the first state to in which abortion was legalized by a popular vote.

In 1970, Pritchard ran for the U.S. House of Representatives to represent Washington's first district, challenging nine-term incumbent Thomas Pelly in the Republican primary. Pelly was renominated, but by a smaller margin than anyone expected.

In 1972, Pelly retired and Pritchard ran for the U.S. House of Representatives again, this time successfully, defeating opponents John Hempleman and Craig Honts in a closely contested election. He was easily reelected in 1974, 1976, 1978, 1980 and 1982, serving from 1973 to 1985. He chose not to run for reelection in 1984.

In 1988, he made a successful run for Lieutenant Governor of Washington, becoming president of the Washington Senate. He was reelected in 1992, serving from 1989 to 1997.

== Personal life ==
Pritchard was the second son of Frank and Jean (McFee) Pritchard. He was born on May 5, 1925, in Seattle, Washington, where he attend public schools, and graduated from Queen Anne High School in June 1944 and later from the University of Washington. He was married and divorced twice and had a son, Frank, and daughters Peggy, Anne and Jeanie.

At the rank of Sergeant, he served in the United States Army from 1944 to 1946. After leaving the service, he attended Marietta College in Ohio from 1946 to 1947. He worked for the Griffin Envelope Company in Seattle from 1948 to 1971 where he became president of the company.

In 1965, while serving in the Washington State Senate, Pritchard, along with friends Bill Bell and Barney McCallum, invented the game of pickleball at his summer home on Bainbridge Island, Washington.

After the end of his second term as Lieutenant Governor, Pritchard went into retirement and became a board member of TVW, the state of Washington's public affairs network. He died on October 9, 1997, in Olympia, Washington, of lymphoma.

== Electoral history ==
- 1992 general election for Lieutenant Governor of Washington
  - Joel Pritchard (R) (inc.), 1,072,968
  - Richard Kelley (D), 862,063
  - Absolutely Nobody (IC), 148,021
  - Tom Isenberg (L), 75,933
- 1988 general election for Lieutenant Governor of Washington
  - Joel Pritchard (R), 960,655
  - George Fleming (D), 839,593
- 1982 general election for U.S. House of Representatives
  - Joel Pritchard (R) (inc.), 123,956
  - Brian Long (D), 59,444
- 1980 general election for U.S. House of Representatives
  - Joel Pritchard (R) (inc.), 180,475
  - Robin Drake (D), 41,830
- 1978 general election for U.S. House of Representatives
  - Joel Pritchard (R) (inc.), 99,942
  - Janice Niemi (D), 52,706
- 1976 general election for U.S. House of Representatives
  - Joel Pritchard (R) (inc.), 161,354
  - Dave Wood (D), 58,006
- 1974 general election for U.S. House of Representatives
  - Joel Pritchard (R) (inc.), 108,391
  - Will Knedlik (D), 44,655
- 1972 general election for U.S. House of Representatives
  - Joel Pritchard (R), 107,581
  - John Hempleman (D), 104,959
  - Craig Honts (SW), 1,401

U.S. House of Representatives
Preceded by Thomas Pelly	Member of the U.S. House of Representatives from Washington's 1st congressional district 1973–1985	Succeeded by John Miller
Political offices
Preceded by John Cherberg	Lieutenant Governor of Washington; 1989–1997	Succeeded by Brad Owen
