= List of Carnegie libraries in Missouri =

The following list of Carnegie libraries in Missouri provides detailed information on United States Carnegie libraries in Missouri, where 33 public libraries were built from 26 grants (totaling $1,502,500) awarded by the Carnegie Corporation of New York from 1899 to 1917. In addition, academic libraries were built at 2 institutions (totaling $95,000).

== Key ==
Building still operating as a library
Building standing, but now serving another purpose
Building no longer standing
Building listed on the National Register of Historic Places
Building contributes to a historic district on the National Register of Historic Places

== Public libraries ==
	Library	City or town	Image	Date granted	Grant amount	Location	Notes
1	Albany	Albany		Jun 2, 1903	$12,500	101 W. Clay St.	Continues to be used as a Public Library. (2014)
2	Aurora	Aurora		Mar 14, 1913	$9,000	202 Jefferson Ave.	Continues to be used as a Public Library. (2012)
3	Bolivar	Bolivar		Nov 3, 1913	$8,000	120 E. Jackson St.	No longer used as a Public Library. (2012)
4	Brookfield	Brookfield		Nov 9, 1916	$12,000	114 E. Wood St.	
5	Cape Girardeau	Cape Girardeau		Nov 9, 1916	$25,000	44 N. Lorimier St.	Open Apr 1, 1922. Closed in 1980, now county offices and courthouse annex. Main entrance obscured by building addition.
6	Carthage	Carthage		Apr 26, 1902	$25,000	321 W. 7th St.	Continues to be used as a Public Library. (2012)
7	Excelsior Springs	Excelsior Springs		Apr 28, 1913	$10,000	339 E. Broadway St.	No longer a public library. (2013)
8	Fayette	Fayette		May 21, 1913	$10,000	201 S. Main St.	Continues to be used as a public library. (2013)
9	Fulton	Fulton		Apr 8, 1911	$12,000	709 Market St.	Continues to be used as a public library. (2024)
10	Huntsville	Huntsville		Apr 13, 1914	$10,000	102 E. Library St.	Continues to be used as a public library. (2013)
11	Jefferson City	Jefferson City		Jan 15, 1900	$25,000	210 Adams St.	
12	Joplin	Joplin		Jul 16, 1901	$60,000	Wall Ave. and 9th St.	Closed April 1981
13	Louisiana	Louisiana		Apr 11, 1902	$10,000	121 N. 3rd St.	Continues to be used as a public library. (2025)
14	Marceline	Marceline		May 3, 1917	$12,500	119 E. California Ave.	
15	Marshfield	Marshfield		Apr 8, 1910	$5,000	219 S. Clay St.	Closed in 1995, now a museum.
16	Maryville	Maryville		Dec 29, 1903	$14,000		Open 1905–1962
17	Mexico	Mexico		Apr 30, 1912	$12,500	149 N. Clark St.	Closed in 1968; old building moved from 316 N. Washington St. to new location December 1990; used as library again 1990–present (2014)
18	Moberly	Moberly		Apr 26, 1902	$20,000	111 N. 4th St.	Continues to be used as a public library. (2013)
19	Monroe City	Monroe City		May 15, 1916	$7,500	109 2nd St.	Combined City Hall and Library. (2013)
20	Nevada	Nevada		Jun 1, 1915	$17,500	225 W. Austin Blvd.	Now a tourism center. Building still standing (2013).
21	Sedalia	Sedalia		Oct 28, 1899	$50,000	311 W. 3rd St.	Recently refurbished. (2013) Still used as a Public Library.
22	Shelbina	Shelbina		Nov 9, 1916	$10,000	102 N. Center St	Continues to be used as a public library. (2013)
23	Springfield	Springfield		Oct 4, 1901	$50,000	397 E. Central St.	Continues to be used as a Public Library. (2012)
24	St. Joseph Carnegie	St. Joseph		Feb 13, 1901	$50,000	316 Massachusetts St.	Continues to be used as a public library. (2013)
25	St. Joseph Washington Park	St. Joseph		Feb 13, 1901	—	1821 N. 3rd St.	Continues to be used as a public library. (2013)
26	St. Louis Central	St. Louis		Mar 12, 1901	$1,000,000	1301 Olive St.	Designed by Cass Gilbert and opened in 1912, renovated 2010–2012.
27	St. Louis Barr	St. Louis		Mar 12, 1901	—	1701 S. Jefferson Ave.	Continues to be used as a Public Library. (2013)
28	St. Louis Cabanne	St. Louis		Mar 12, 1901	—	1106 Union Blvd.	Continues to be used as a Public Library. (2013)
29	St. Louis Carondelet	St. Louis		Mar 12, 1901	—	6800 Michigan Ave.	Reopened 2012 after renovations, and continues to be used as a Public Library. (2013)
30	St. Louis Carpenter	St. Louis		Mar 12, 1901	—	3309 S. Grand Blvd.	Continues to be used as a Public Library. (2013)
31	St. Louis Divoll	St. Louis		Mar 12, 1901	—	1257 Farrar St.	Closed c.1965. Located in the Hyde Park neighborhood. Another branch by the same name was opened in another part of the city.
32	St. Louis Soulard	St. Louis		Mar 12, 1901	—	706 Lafayette Ave.	Opened in 1910, the building still stands, but it is no longer used as a library. (2013)
33	Webb City	Webb City		Apr 28, 1913	$25,000	101 S. Liberty Ave.	Continues to be used as a Public Library (2012).

== Academic libraries ==
	Institution	Locality	Image	Year granted	Grant amount	Location	Notes
1	Park College	Parkville		Mar 15, 1904; May 2, 1921	$15,000 $50,000		Now called the Norrington Center, this building includes the McAfee Memorial Library.
2	William Jewell College	Liberty		Dec 14, 1906	$30,000		Replaced in 1965

== See also ==
- List of libraries in the United States
