= Samuel and Pauline Peery House =

Historic house in Missouri, United States

- U.S. National Register of Historic Places
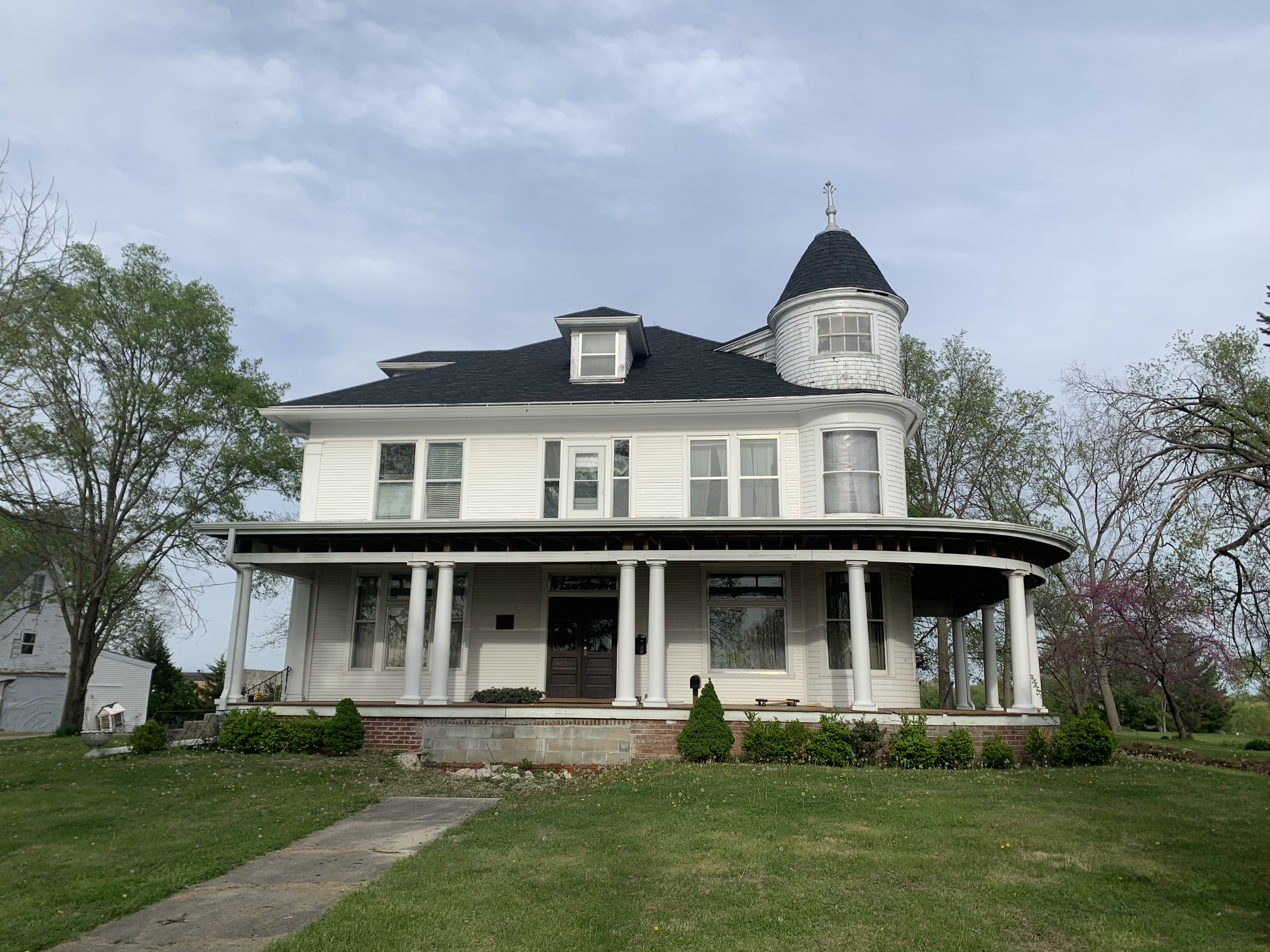
- House viewed from the west

- Location within Missouri Location within the United States
- Location: 1105 N. Hundley St., Albany, Missouri
- Coordinates: 40°15′21″N 94°19′51″W
- Area: 3.3 acres (1.3 ha)
- Built: 1901
- Architect: Eckel, Edmond Jacques
- Architectural style: Queen Anne
- NRHP reference No.: 05000881
- Added to NRHP: August 11, 2005

Samuel and Pauline Peery House is a historic home located at Albany, Gentry County, Missouri. It was designed by the architect Edmond Jacques Eckel and built in 1901. It is a 2 1/2-story, Queen Anne style frame dwelling. It has a hipped roof with hipped dormers. It features a three-story, round tower topped by a bell cast dome and a galleried wraparound porch. Also on the property is the contributing original carriage house.

It was listed on the National Register of Historic Places in 2005.
