= Thomas Pelly =

American politician (1902–1973)

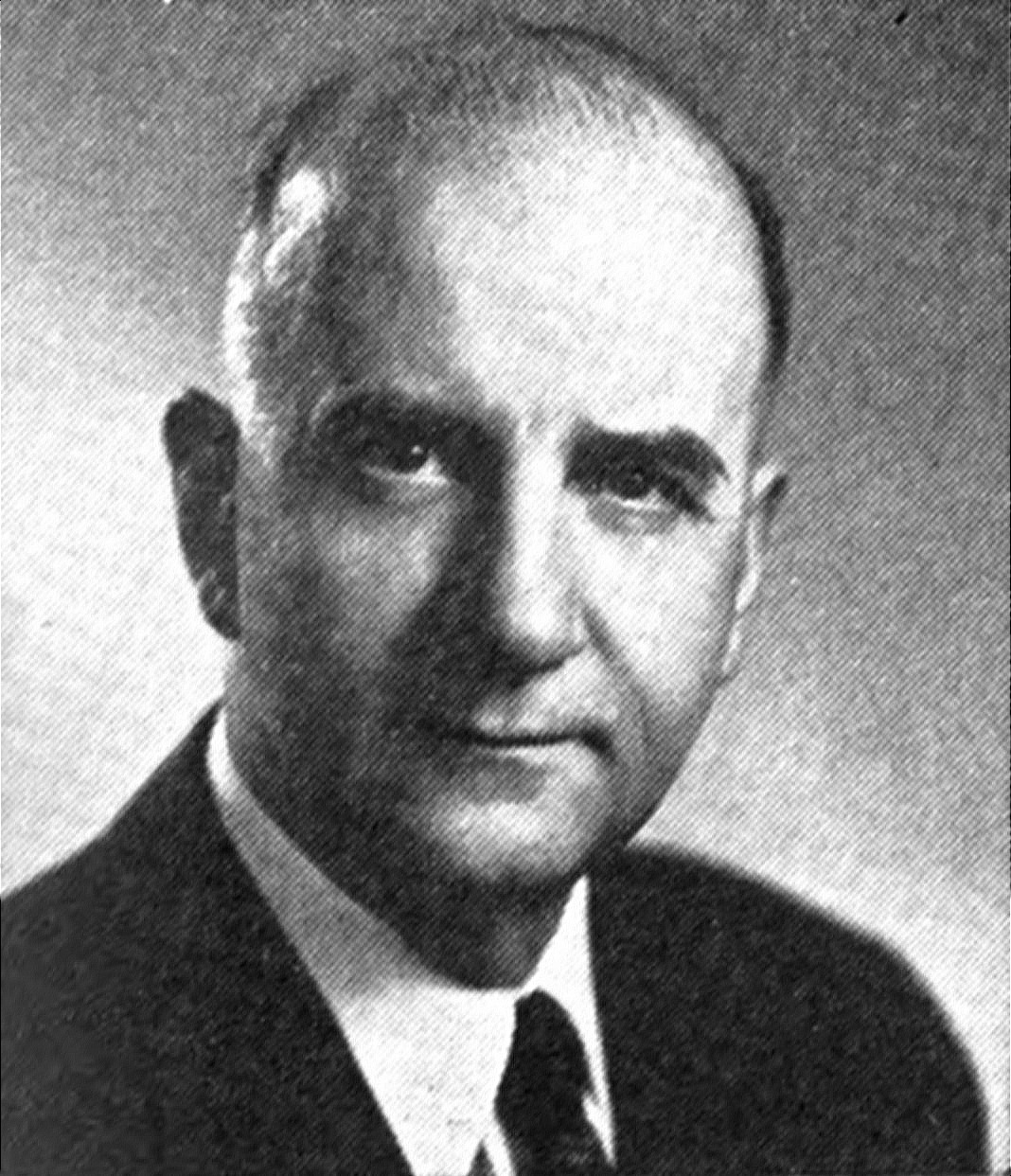
- Pelly in 1965

Member of the U.S. House of Representatives from Washington's 1st district
- In office January 3, 1953 – January 3, 1973
- Preceded by: Hugh Mitchell
- Succeeded by: Joel Pritchard

Personal details
- Born: Thomas Minor Pelly; August 22, 1902 Seattle, Washington, U.S.
- Died: November 21, 1973 (aged 71) Ojai, California, U.S.
- Party: Republican

Thomas Minor Pelly (August 22, 1902 – November 21, 1973) was an American politician. He served as a U.S. representative from the state of Washington between 1953 and 1973.

== Early life ==
Pelly was born on August 22, 1902, in Seattle, Washington. His parents were Bernard Pelly, the British consul to Seattle and Elizabeth Montgomery Minor Pelly, the daughter of former mayor of Seattle Thomas T. Minor. He attended Summit School and the University School in Victoria, British Columbia, before taking classes at the Hoosac School in Hoosick, New York. He renounced his British citizenship at the age of 21.

He worked various jobs: first with the West and Wheeler Real Estate Company and then with the Seattle National Bank a forerunner of Seafirst Bank where he was eventually promoted to trust officer in the late 1920s, after joining as a foot messenger. He married Mary Virginia Taylor in 1927, after meeting her on Bainbridge Island, where his family had a house. The couple had two children: Marion Elizabeth and Tom Minor Jr. In 1930, he started working for the Lowman & Hanford Stationery Company, during which time he wrote and published Judgement, and other poems, North-Westward, The Story of Restoration Point and Country Club and Dr. Minor: A Sketch of the Background and Life of Thos. T. Minor, M.D. Five years later, he became the company president.

== Career ==
Pelly first ran for public office in 1932, when he contested a seat in the Washington House of Representatives. His Democratic opponent sued to have Pelly classed as a British citizen and although Pelly won the lawsuit, he lost the election. He was active in the community, serving as vice chair of the Seattle Community Chest and as a director of the Seattle Symphony, the Seattle Art Museum, the Seattle Trust and Savings Bank, the Olympia State Bank and Trust Company, the Shaw and Borden Company, Johnson's Inc. of Spokane, the Lakeside School, and the Helen Bush School. During World War II, he joined the council of the Seattle United Service Organization, which assisted military personnel by organizing recreation.

=== Seattle Chamber of Commerce ===
Pelly was elected president of the Seattle Chamber of Commerce in 1949, focusing his efforts on this position. He worked to negotiate a purchase agreement between the city and Puget Sound Power and Light and organized a committee to agree the purchase of a ferryboat system between the Black Ball Line and Governor Arthur B. Langlie. He often traveled through the state to promote Seattle and attended most sessions of the state legislature. He was honored as the First Citizen of the Year by the Seattle-King County Association of Realtors on January 24, 1951, for his work at the chamber of commerce.

=== U.S. House of Representatives ===
Pelly was first elected to the United States House of Representatives on November 4, 1952, as the representative for the 1st district. He ran as a Republican, receiving 51.37 percent of the vote in the Eisenhower sweep. His district was the largest by population and contained Sand Point Naval Air Station, Fort Lawton and the Puget Sound Naval Shipyard, as well as Boeing, the Keyport Torpedo Station, and the Bangor Ammunition Depot. He would ultimately serve ten terms in office. In 1966, he won re-election with 80.27 percent of the vote and was the first congressional Republican candidate to be endorsed by the King County Central Labor Council.

Pelly focused on the issues of fisheries and environmental protection during his 20 years in office. He was a member of the House merchant marine and fisheries committee and continuously worked to improve working conditions for merchant marines. He worked with Senator Warren Magnuson to impose sanctions on South American countries who impounded American fishing vessels that violated their claimed territorial waters. Pelly introduced a bill to make the U.S. Maritime Administration an independent agency, and supported the July 1965 establishment of the Joint Oceanographic Research Group in Seattle. He was a member of the House science and astronautics committee, the only one from the Northwest. He voted against H.R. 4671, which would have built two dams near the Grand Canyon, and introduced H. R. 17202 in 1972 which established the North Cascades National Park following a petition with 30,000 signatures collected by The Mountaineers, the Sierra Club, and the North Cascades Conservation Council.

In financial matters, he introduced H. R. 16551 to amend the Social Security Act to adjust social security benefits in line with inflation and supported tax relief for college students and their parents. In 1961, he served as the spokesperson for a group of congressmen who opposed President John F. Kennedy's proposed foreign aid plan, which would have involved borrowing $7.3 billion from the U.S. Treasury across five years and spending $4.8 billion in 1961. Pelly’s goal was to review how foreign aid borrowing was occurring and allow the appropriations committee to authorize the funds.

Pelly voted in favor of the Civil Rights Acts of 1957, 1960, 1964, and 1968, as well as the 24th Amendment to the U.S. Constitution and the Voting Rights Act of 1965. Pelly also voted in favor of Medicare and Medicaid, and was one of 20 House Republicans to vote in favor of the repeal of section (14(B)) of the Taft-Hartley Act, which would have ended right-to-work laws.

Pelly reportedly considered running for governor in the 1964 election and in 1966, he was the preferred vice presidential candidate for Richard Nixon amongst state Republicans, although he never ran for any other office. In 1972, he chose not to seek re-election and he was succeeded by Joel Pritchard.

== Death ==
Pelly died on November 21, 1973, in Ojai, California, while on holiday. He was 71 years old.

U.S. House of Representatives
Preceded by Hugh Mitchell	Member of the U.S. House of Representatives from Washington's 1st congressional district January 3, 1953 – January 3, 1973	Succeeded by Joel Pritchard
