= Refused ballot =

Explicit option to not cast a vote

A refused ballot, or similar alternative, is a choice available to voters in many elections. This is an alternative for many people to casting a disparaging spoiled ballot, which is not counted separately from ballots which have been accidentally spoiled.

== Canada ==
Some provinces allow a ballot to be refused on the grounds that no party satisfies the elector's vote. Declined ballots are only legislated in the provinces of Ontario, Manitoba, Saskatchewan and Alberta; the option is only available for provincial elections.

During the 2000 Canadian federal election, a number of voters (chiefly in Edmonton, Alberta) ate their ballots, as part of what they dubbed the Edible Ballot Society, to protest what they saw as inherently unfair elections. The stunt led Elections Canada to propose that there be legislation allowing federal ballots to be officially refused.

== Russia ==
Russian electoral ballots used to contain a box named Against All, allowing the voter to register a "protest vote" against all the candidates running. This was abolished by the Duma in 2006.

A March 2004 opinion poll saw ruling President Vladimir Putin draw 70% support from Russians, but "Against All" managed to claim the second place, ahead of the other candidates.

In December 2004, "Against All" actually managed to draw the highest number of votes in the electoral districts of St. Petersburg, Sverdlovsk and Ulyanovsk. A repeat election led to St. Petersburg and Sverdlovsk electing proper Members of Parliament. Ulyanovsk's second vote however, after two candidates dropped out of the race, actually saw "Against All" gain more support in the polls, now pulling in 21.5% of the vote, nearly double what any of the actual candidates received.

== See also ==
- None of the above
- Brewster's Millions, 1985 film in which a millionaire encourages people to vote "None of the Above" for New York City mayor.
