= George Flamank =

American football and basketball player and coach (1904–1987)

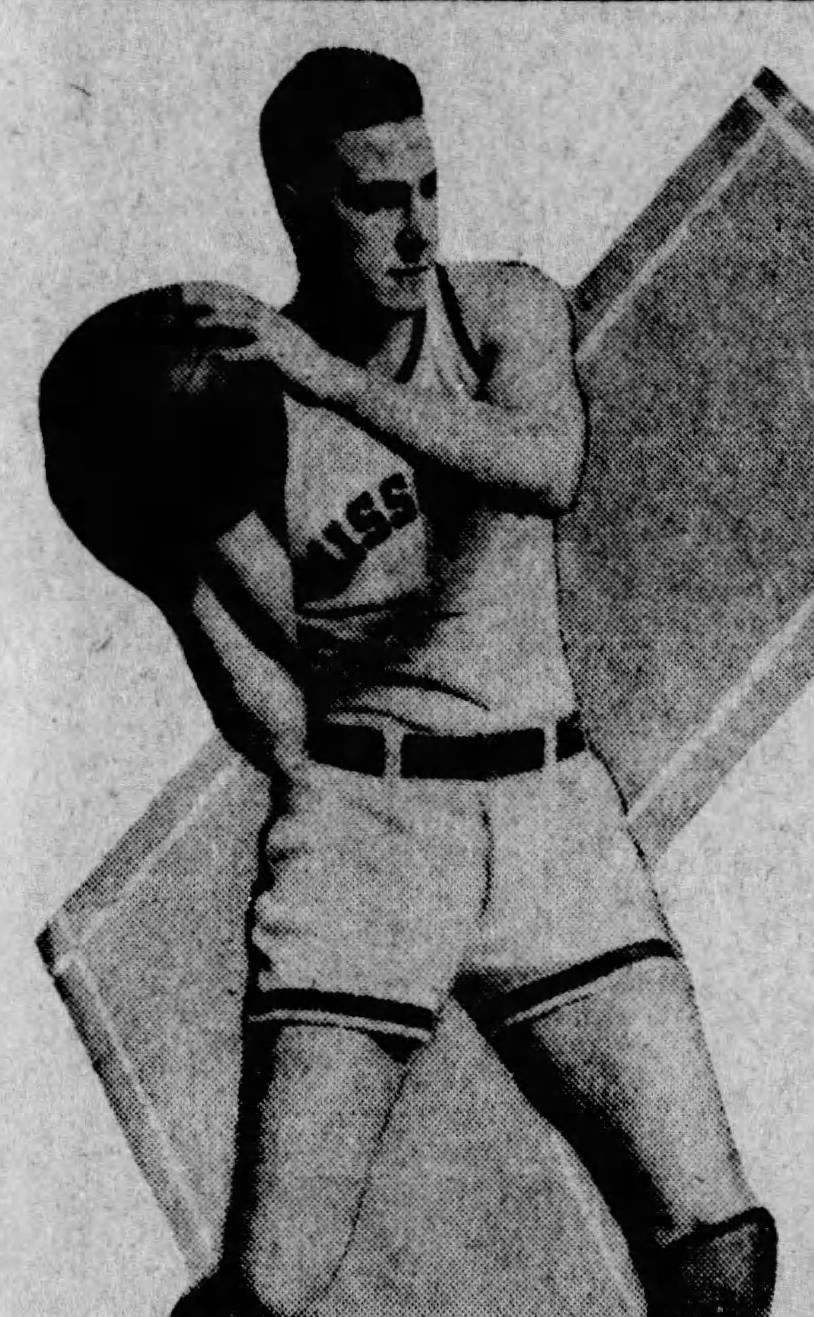
- Flamank as a members of the Missouri Tigers men's basketball team in 1928

Biographical details
- Born: 1904; Chicago, Illinois, U.S.
- Died: January 29, 1987 (aged 82); Columbia, Missouri, U.S.

Playing career

Football
- 1925–1927: Missouri
- Position: Quarterback

Coaching career (HC unless noted)

Football
- 1930–1931: Southeast Missouri Normal

Basketball
- 1930–1932: Southeast Missouri Normal

Head coaching record
- Overall: 3–14–1 (college football); 13–19 (college basketball)

George H. Flamank (1904 – January 29, 1987) was an American college football and college basketball player and coach.

== Career ==
He served as the head football coach (1930–1931) and head men's basketball coach (1930–1932) at Southeast Missouri State University. Flamank was a standout athlete at the University of Missouri.

Flamank was born in Chicago and raised in St. Joseph, Missouri, where graduated from Benton High School in 1924. He later coached football and basketball at Stanberry High School in Stanberry, Missouri, leading his football team to a undefeated season in 1951. Flamank was also the mayor of Albany, Missouri. He died on January 29, 1987, at hospital in Columbia, Missouri.

== Head coaching record ==
=== College football ===
Year	Team	Overall	Conference	Standing	Bowl/playoffs
Southeast Missouri State Indians (Missouri Intercollegiate Athletic Association) (1930–1931)
1930	Southeast Missouri State	1–6–1	0–2	T–4th	
1931	Southeast Missouri State	2–8	0–4	5th	
Southeast Missouri State:		3–14–1	0–6		
Total:		3–14–1			
