= None of the above =

Ballot option to not vote for any candidate

"None of the above" (NOTA), or none for short, also known as "against all" or a "scratch" vote, is a ballot option in some jurisdictions or organizations, designed to allow the voter to indicate disapproval of the candidates in a voting system. It is based on the principle that consent requires the ability to withhold consent in an election, just as they can by voting "No" on ballot questions. It must be contrasted with "abstention", in which a voter does not cast a ballot.

Entities that include "None of the Above" on ballots as standard procedure include Argentina, Belarus, Belgium, Bulgaria („Не подкрепям никого“, "I do not support anyone"), Colombia (voto en blanco), France (vote blanc, "blank vote"), Greece (λευκό, blank), India ("None of the above"), Indonesia (kotak kosong, "empty box"), Kazakhstan, Mongolia, the Netherlands, North Korea, Norway, Peru, Spain (voto en blanco, "blank vote"), Uruguay, and the U.S. state of Nevada (None of These Candidates).

Russia had such an option on its ballots (Против всех, "against all") until it was abolished in 2006. Bangladesh introduced this option (না ভোট, "no vote") in 2008. Pakistan introduced this option on ballot papers for the 2013 Pakistan elections, but the Election Commission of Pakistan later rejected it. Beginning with the 2016 presidential election, and 2017 parliamentary one, Bulgaria introduced a 'none of the above' option, which received in the presidential elections 5.59% of the vote in the first round and 4.47% in the run-off. It was also used in the 2019 mayoral election of Sofia. Kazakhstan originally included the option (Бәріне қарсымын, "against all") from 1995 to 2004, and from 2021 onwards after reintroducing the option, which notably received 5.8% of the vote in the 2022 presidential election.

When "none of the above" is listed on a ballot, there is the possibility of NOTA receiving a majority or plurality of the vote, and so "winning" the election. This possibility is not purely theoretical, as NOTA has indeed won occasionally. In such a case, a variety of formal procedures may be invoked, including having the position remain vacant, having the position filled by appointment, re-opening nominations, or holding another election (in a body operating under parliamentary procedure), or it may have no effect, as in India and the US state of Nevada, where the next highest total wins regardless.

== Bangladesh ==
In 2008, Bangladesh's interim government amended election laws to allow voters to cast "no" votes (না ভোট) if they do not approve of any of the candidates.

The law also states that if such "no" votes amount to 50% or more of the total votes cast, a by-election is required to be held.

== Bulgaria ==
Since 2016, voters can vote for the "I do not support anyone" (Не подкрепям никого) option. These votes are however excluded from the calculation of the electoral threshold.

== Canada ==
No electoral jurisdiction in Canada formally lists "none of the above" as a ballot option. However, in some provincial elections it is effectively possible to vote for "none of the above", by attending the polling station and formally "declining to vote". These declined votes are counted and become part of the electoral record.

A businessman in Prince George, British Columbia ran in the 1997 federal election in the district of Prince George—Bulkley Valley under the name Zznoneoff, Thea Bove (Thea Bove Zznoneoff); since ballots listed candidates alphabetically by surname, he appeared at the bottom. He came sixth of seven candidates with 0.977 percent of votes cast.

A resident of Oshawa, Ontario, formerly known as Sheldon Bergson, had legally changed his name to "Above Znoneofthe", and had registered under that name as a candidate in several provincial and federal elections, most recently challenging the sitting prime minister's riding of Papineau in the 2021 Canadian federal election as the Rhinoceros Party candidate. His name order was chosen so that his name would always appear at the bottom of the ballot as "Znoneofthe, Above", although this only works federally as provincial election ballots do not list the candidates in surname order.

The 2020 Green Party leadership election featured a preferential ballot which allowed voters to select "none of the options" as a ranked selection.

In Ontario, the None of the Above Party of Ontario is a registered political party, although its stated mandate is for its candidates to serve in the legislature as independent representatives who reflect the views and interests of their constituents, rather than simply as a "reject all of the candidates" placeholder.

== Colombia ==
In Colombia, a NOTA option in the ballots has been recognized by the Constitutional Court of Colombia by upholding a political reform law (Law 1475 of 2011), declaring that a None of the Above vote is "a political expression of dissent, abstention or inconformity with political effects" and also adding that "a None of the Above vote constitutes a valuable expression of dissent through which the electorate's will protection can be promoted. As such, the constitution grants it a decisive importance in the election of uni-personal offices and public corporations". The NOTA option has been present in ballots since at least 1991; in fact legislative act 01 of 2009 instructs what should happen if NOTA would "win" an election.

In accordance with the aforementioned Act, if an election for a public corporation (such as Congress, Assemblies or Councils), Governor, Mayor or the first round of the presidential elections would end with None of the Above as the absolute majority of valid ballots, the election must be repeated a single time with new candidates (for unipersonal offices, like president, governor or mayor) and for public corporations, the election must be repeated with only the lists which had achieved the threshold for seats. If the blank vote is again the majority in the new election, then the candidate with the most votes is declared elected.

In the regional elections of 2011 for the municipality of Bello, Antioquia, 56.7% of voters picked None of the Above, defeating the uncontested candidate and prompting the election for Mayor to be repeated.

== France ==
In France, the NOTA vote has been recognised since the Revolution. According to the law currently (May 2023) applicable, "Blank ballot papers are counted separately and annexed to the minutes. They are not taken into account for the determination of the votes cast, but they are specially mentioned in the results of the ballot. An envelope containing no ballot paper is considered to be a blank ballot paper." The blank (i.e. "white") vote is considered as an act of political participation (very different to abstention where the voter does not cast a ballot, as well as to casting an invalid ballot) sending the message that "none of the options suits me", for instance in the case of a referendum.

== India ==
Symbol used with NOTA option on ballot papers and electronic voting machines in India

The Election Commission of India told the Supreme Court in 2009 that it wished to offer the voter a "none of the above" option on ballots, which the government had generally opposed. The People's Union for Civil Liberties, a non-governmental organisation, filed a public-interest litigation statement in support of this.

On 27 September 2013, the Supreme Court of India ruled that the right to register a "none of the above" vote in elections should apply and ordered the Election Commission to provide such a button in the electronic voting machines, noting that it would increase participation.

The Election Commission also clarified that even though votes cast as NOTA are counted, they are considered as invalid votes so they will not change the outcome of the election process. They are not taken into account for calculating the total valid votes and will not be considered for determining the forfeiture of deposit.

In the 2014 general election, NOTA polled 1.1% of the votes, counting to over 6,000,000.

The specific symbol for NOTA, a ballot paper with a black cross across it, was introduced on 18 September 2015. The symbol is designed by National Institute of Design, Ahmedabad.

== Indonesia ==
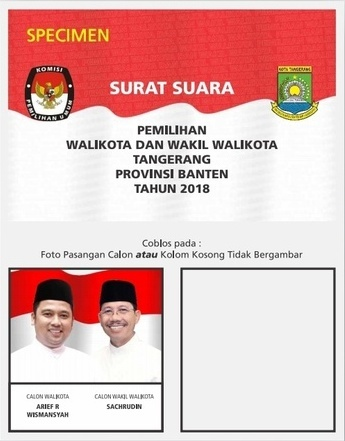
A sample ballot for the uncontested 2018 mayoral elections in Tangerang

The Indonesian Law 10 of 2016 regulates local elections, and includes provisions for elections in which there is only one candidate. In such cases, the candidate contests the election against a NOTA option (commonly referred to as kotak kosong/empty box), and is declared the winner if they manage to secure a majority of the valid votes. Otherwise, the election will be postponed to the next occurrence; the government of Indonesia appoints an acting office holder until the new election, in which the losing candidate is eligible to stand again.

There were three uncontested runs in the 2015 local elections, nine in the 2017 local elections, at least 13 in the 2018 local elections (including the mayoral elections for Tangerang and Makassar), 25 in the 2020 local elections, and 37 in the 2024 local elections.

As of 2024, three second-level local elections have resulted in NOTA "victories". In the 2018 election for mayor of Makassar, the NOTA option received over 300,000 votes, 35,000 more than the sole candidate, forcing a repeat election in 2020. In 2024, the elections for mayor of Pangkalpinang and the regent of Bangka Regency also resulted in NOTA "wins".

== Kazakhstan ==
In Kazakhstan, the "none of the above" (Бәріне қарсымын, "against all") option is provided in voting ballots as per Article 37(1) of the Constitutional Law "On Elections". Initially introduced in the 1991 presidential election, voters could cross out candidate names as means of choosing NOTA. The option was officially included in the election law in 1995 but removed in 2004. Despite its removal, activists protested by casting unofficial NOTA votes and engaging in spoiled voting. In 2016, Astana lawyer Anton Fabry unsuccessfully sought a complaint to the Supreme Court, alleging that the Central Election Commission had completely neglected the interests of NOTA voters by excluding the voting option from the ballots as an "deliberate deception" to manipulate voter turnout.

During the 2021 legislative election, its absence was a significant issue, leading President Kassym-Jomart Tokayev to propose reinstating it, resulting in its reinstatement in June 2021. The NOTA option for the first time was used again during the direct elections of rural äkims (local heads) in July 2021. In the 2022 presidential election, the NOTA option received 5.8% (460,484 votes), making it the second-largest picked option in the vote share. However, Minister of Justice Qanat Musin clarified that NOTA votes would only be considered as evidence of voter turnout, not as a determining factor due to a lack of legislation on the matter, emphasizing its role as an exercise of the right to participate in elections.

== Norway ==
The Norwegian election regulation makes it mandatory to present voters with blank ballots in addition to all of the approved parties and election lists. In the parliamentary election of 2013, 12,874 votes, which is 0.45% of the total votes given, were blank.

== Peru ==
In Peru, the ballot is declared null and void if two-thirds of the voters vote blank.

== Philippines ==
In the Bangsamoro autonomous region, the Bangsamoro Electoral Code originally mandated a "none of the above" option in ballots and was set to be first implemented in the upcoming Bangsamoro Parliament election. It was not considered as a candidate, but it was unclear what would happen if the NOTA option "won" an election. There was a proposal to remove the option altogether since if the NOTA option "won" it could have left a position vacant.

In the end the NOTA option was never implemented as it was removed through an amendment of the Electoral Code in January 2026.

== Soviet Union ==
In the 1990 elections that led to the dissolution of the Soviet Union, the Soviet version of "none of above" (cross out voting) led to new elections with new candidates in 200 races of the 1,500-seat Congress of People's Deputies. More than 100 incumbents representing the Communist Party of the Soviet Union were defeated in the run-off, leading Boris Yeltsin to later say the "none of the above" option "helped convince the people they had real power even in a rigged election, and [it] played a role in building true democracy."

== Spain ==
=== Blank ballot ===
Owing to the Spanish voting regulations (legislación electoral española), (in Spanish) the blank ballot is recognized as 'none of the above' (voto en blanco) but has very little chance to influence the distribution of seats within a democratic election. It is mostly considered as a statistical indicator of candidatures' disapproval. The blank ballots only increase the number of valid votes, raising the threshold of votes (3% and 5% depending on the election) which every political party has to overcome to be fully considered. The parties over the threshold get their seats according to the D'Hondt method.

=== Blank seats (escaños en blanco) ===
Since 1999, several political parties have arisen in order to make visible the 'none of the above' option in the parliaments and force empty seats. "Blank Seats" ran for the Congress and Senate elections of 20 November 2011. Its programme is to leave empty the corresponding assigned seats by not taking full possession of their duties as congressperson, senator, etc. According to law, the seat remains assigned to the elected candidate until the possession act takes place, the elected candidate explicitly refuses or new elections are called. In this way, the political party and its candidates stay free from obligations and are not entitled to receive any money from the public funding scheme for politics.

By voting such option at the local elections in May 2011, the citizens of the villages of Gironella (Barcelona) and Foixà (Girona) were able to reduce the number of politicians in their councils by one and two respectively. Overall, citizenship supported Blank Seats at different municipalities, including Barcelona, with 15,582 votes (averaging 1.71% of valid votes).

The Ciudadanos En Blanco (Citizens for Blank Votes) party aims to give blank ballots the meaning of representing empty seats if the votes indicate so as for any other party, disbanding the party when such law would be approved.

== United Kingdom ==
UK electoral counting procedures require that all votes be counted and announced, including 'rejected' votes. 'Rejected votes' are classified into four categories, protest votes are recorded with others rejected as 'voter's intention uncertain'.

=== NOTA UK ===
NOTA UK is a voluntary organisation set up in 2010 to campaign for a formal None Of The Above (NOTA) option to be added to ballot papers for all future UK elections. It has made numerous written evidence submissions to the parliamentary Political and Constitutional Reform Select Committee (PCRC) making the case for NOTA 'with teeth', i.e. formalised consequences for the election result in the event of a NOTA 'win' (as opposed to 'faux' NOTA, whereby the next placed candidate takes office anyway as happens in India and elsewhere). As a result of these representations, the PCRC explicitly recommended in its final report on 'voter engagement', published in February 2015, that the next UK government should hold a public consultation before May 2016 solely on inclusion of NOTA on UK ballot papers. This in turn has led to increased support for and awareness of NOTA UK's campaign and its founder, recording artist and music producer Jamie Stanley (known as Mailman), being asked to give a number of media interviews. No public consultation materialised as the incoming Conservative majority government scrapped the PCRC, effectively disregarding all of its recommendations.

Since 2015, in part thanks to NOTA UK's lobbying, it has been a policy of the Green Party of England and Wales to get a form of NOTA (RON – Re-Open Nominations) on UK ballot papers. In the run-up to the 2017 UK general election, NOTA UK wrote to the Green party suggesting that they should reword the policy so that, instead of RON, it refers specifically to the more self-explanatory NOTA, and that they should also place the policy centre stage in their next manifesto.

=== Above and Beyond Party ===
Logo of the Above and Beyond Party

The Above and Beyond Party was founded in 2015 and fielded eight candidates in the 2015 general election, none of whom were elected. Their sole stated policy was to introduce a "none of the above" option on all UK ballot papers. The party's logo is based on the West African Adinkra symbol "Aya", "derived from a fern tree which famously grows in difficult-to-survive places", and a symbol of resilience. Critics pointed out that their website and Facebook page at the time indicated that they had policy ideas and a political agenda beyond the single issue of NOTA and appeared to be jumping on the bandwagon of other NOTA campaigns.

==== Inception and officers ====
The party registered with the Electoral Commission on 18 March 2015. The Electoral Commission listed the party leader, nominating officer and campaigns officer as Mark Flanagan and the treasurer was Karen Stanley. The party chairman was Michael Ross. The party was de-registered by the Electoral Commission on 3 November 2016.

==== Electoral history ====
Above and Beyond fielded four candidates in the 2015 general election. The candidates stood in Clwyd West, Cheadle, Sheffield Central and Leeds North West. In Sheffield Hallam the party endorsed Carlton Reeve, an independent candidate. No Above and Beyond candidate received 5% or more of the votes cast, therefore all lost their deposit.

==== Finance ====
The party raised funds partially through "AboveBeyond" music nights.

=== No Candidate Deserves My Vote! party ===
No Candidate Deserves My Vote! was registered as a political party with the UK Electoral Commission on 23 November 2000. The No Candidate Deserves My Vote party's single objective is to introduce a bill to Parliament to have a "none of the above" option added to every local and general election ballot paper of the future. They feel this will allow the UK electorate to exercise their democratic right to vote to say that none of the parties currently represents them, which will encourage their democratic responsibility to turn out to vote. If a candidate wins an election it is the intention to stay as a Member of Parliament until the change in the law is enacted. Only then will the candidate step down and the party be disbanded.

It is the intention of the party that, if a NOTA gains the majority vote, it should cause an automatic by-election, the idea being that the majority will have given a vote of no confidence in the candidates. If the same candidates stand under the same policies, then the electorate simply votes NOTA until the candidates change their policies to something that the electorate can vote for.

In 2010, Stephen Phillips of Stevenage stood in the UK general election on behalf of No Candidate Deserves My Vote. Phillips received 327 votes, or 0.7% of the vote, placing 7th out of 9 candidates.

=== NOTA party ===
The NOTA Party, in recent years also known as Notavote, was registered as a political party with the UK Electoral Commission on 2 March 2009. It was the intention of the NOTA party to field candidates in every UK parliamentary constituency. The respective NOTA candidates would not have continued in office had they received the most votes; this was merely a mechanism to simulate the recording of a formal NOTA vote. The party was registered as 'NOTA' and not 'None of the Above' as the latter is a prohibited expression regarding registration as a party name. A subsequent attempt to re-register the NOTA party in 2014 was blocked by the Electoral Commission on the grounds that the acronym 'NOTA' is as good as the phrase 'None of the Above', the logic being that it would confuse voters into thinking it is possible to cast a formal vote for 'None of the Above' when they would in fact just be voting for another party, albeit one standing on a single issue NOTA platform.

=== Zero, None Of the Above ===
None Of The Above Zero was a candidate at the 2010 general election in Filton and Bradley Stoke. Previously known as Eric Mutch, he changed his name by deed poll to stand under that name. As candidates are listed by surname first he appeared on the ballot paper as "Zero, None Of The Above", in effect giving voters a "none of the above" option since had he been elected he would have resigned immediately. He came last with 172 votes.

=== Others ===
A Parliamentary Petition calling for the introduction of 'none of the above' as an option to every list of constituency candidates runs until 18 November 2026. A page explaining the petition and the reasons for it can be found on the 'Just Human?' website.

In the British parliamentary elections of 2010, a former boxer changed his name by deed poll from Terry Marsh to "None Of The Above X", in order to run as a parliamentary candidate under that name in the constituency of South Basildon and East Thurrock. Claiming that he will not take the seat if he wins, he told BBC Essex: "I don't take it for one moment that it would be a vote for me. ... I'm doing what I think the Electoral Commission should be doing and what should be on every ballot paper in any electoral process." BBC News reported that, while the Registration of Political Parties (Prohibited Words and Expressions) (Amendment) Order 2005 stipulates that no political party can be registered in the UK under the name "None of the Above", there is no legislation against a person changing their name by deed poll and appearing on the ballot paper as "None Of the Above". In the event he polled 0.3% of the vote, the lowest of any candidate standing.

- Another individual changed his name by deed poll to "None Of The Above" in order to stand as a candidate in Chingford and Woodford Green in 2010. With the surname Above, he was listed first on the ballot paper in alphabetical order, with all the other candidates listed below.
- The South Wales Anarchists group has run a campaign urging people to "Vote Nobody" since 2008 and many other anarchist groups worldwide have promoted similar slogans.
- The Landless Peasant Party, which advocates the ownership of land by those who live on it and the replacement of income tax by a flat land tax, and whose leader Derek Jackson gained publicity for standing against then- Prime Minister Gordon Brown in his home constituency in the 2010 elections, include a pledge to add a "None of the above" option to the ballot in all UK elections.

== United States ==
The origins of the ballot option "None of the Above" in the United States can be traced to when the State of Nevada adopted "None of These Candidates" as a ballot option in 1976. In some United States presidential primaries, individuals can vote for unpledged delegates by voting Uncommitted. "None of the above" is also permitted in the bylaws of the Libertarian Party, with NOTA winning the 2024 Libertarian Party presidential primaries in North Carolina and Massachusetts.

In 1998 in California, citizen proponents of Proposition 23, titled the "None of the Above Act", qualified a new State ballot initiative through circulated petitions submitted to the Secretary of State, but the measure was defeated in the March 2000 general election 64% to 36%. Were it to be passed by the voters, it was meant to require this new ballot option for all state and federal elective offices, exempting only local judicial races; in determining official election results, the "none of the above" voter tally would be discarded in favor of the candidate with the greatest number of votes.

No similar options were known to have been permitted in any other states as of 2022.

== Other countries (None of the Above candidates and parties) ==
- In Serbia, None of the above (Ниједан од понуђених одговора, НОПО) was a parliamentary political party, founded in 2010 by Budimir Grom, which was mostly popularized on Facebook and less so on other social networking websites. In 2012 Serbian parliamentary election they received 22,905 votes, and thus won one seat in the National Assembly of Serbia.
- Geoff Richardson changed his full name to "Of The Above None" and stood as an independent for the seat of Gilmore at the 2007 Australian federal election. His name appeared as NONE, Of the Above on the ballot.
- In 2010 Ukrainian presidential election, a candidate Vasiliy Humeniuk changed his name to Vasily Protyvsih (Vasily Against-all). "Against all candidates" is the name of the "none of the above" vote used in Russia and Ukraine.
- In 2000, Michael Moore advocated a write-in candidate Ficus (the plant) for Congress as a unified vote for none of the above in congressional seats where the incumbent was running unopposed.
- David Gatchell of Tennessee ran for governor in 2002 and for Senate in 2006 as a protest, officially changing his middle name from Leroy to None of the Above. In 2006, he got 3,738 votes (0.2 percent).
- For the 2013 Pakistani general election, the Election Commission of Pakistan unilaterally decided that a 'none of the above' box would be available as a voting option on ballot papers. However, the commission subsequently decided against it owing to the short amount of time remaining until the elections. The concept was suggested to the Election Commission by Abid Hassan Manto, a constitutional expert and a senior lawyer of the Supreme Court of Pakistan.
- Elections in South Ossetia have an "against all" option.
- Elections in Abkhazia have a "None of the above" option.
- In 2021, the States Assembly of the Bailiwick of Jersey voted to introduce a 'None of the Above' ballot option for uncontested elections, which is set to debut at the 2022 Jersey general election. This has been designed as a means to eliminate uncontested elections to the Island's parliament. If the number of candidates standing for election is equal to or fewer than the available vacancies, voters will have the option to vote for 'None of the Above' to reject the candidate and hold a new election, effectively functioning as a confirmatory ballot.

== Procedures that function like "none of the above" ==
Most ballots do not have a formal "none of the above" option, but some have procedures that work in a similar way.

=== Argentina ===
In Argentina casting an envelope without a ballot in a ballot box counts as a blank vote.

=== Poland ===
In 1989 legislative election in Poland voters were able to vote against the only candidate running, often from the ruling Polish United Workers' Party by crossing out the candidate's name on the ballot. As a result, voters defeated the sitting prime minister and dozens of leading Communists because they failed to get the required majority.

=== Re-open Nominations (RON) ===
Many students' unions in Britain, Ireland, and others use a similar ballot option called 're-open nominations' (RON) in IRV and single transferable vote (STV) elections. These include the National Union of Students in the UK and UCD Student's Union in Ireland. The difference is that RON is a vote against all candidates in FPTP (first-past-the-post) and all subsequent candidates in an IRV or STV election.

RON is not strictly a none of the above candidate in transferable vote elections, as when RON is eliminated during the count its votes are transferred to other candidates if those preferences exist.

=== Illegal ballots in Robert's Rules of Order ===
The American Robert's Rules of Order, Newly Revised (RONR) describes various forms of illegal ballots, which are ballots which do not count for any candidate. Blanks are treated as "scrap paper", and are of no effect, but "unintelligible ballots or ballots cast for an unidentifiable candidate or a fictional character are treated as illegal votes. All illegal votes cast by legal voters… are taken into account in determining the number of votes cast for purposes of computing the majority." RONR always requires a majority for election; thus, casting an illegal ballot or one for a hopeless candidate, whether on the ballot or as a write-in, is equivalent to voting No for all other candidates. "The principle is that a choice has no mandate from the voting body unless approval is expressed by more than half of those entitled to vote and registering any evidence of having some opinion."

=== No award ===
Voting for the Hugo Awards is by instant runoff voting, in which nominees for a category are ranked. There are normally seven options: six nominees, plus "No Award". A first preference vote for no award implies that the voter believes that either the category should be abolished, or that none of the nominees are worthy of an award. A second or subsequent preference implies that any higher-ranked nominees are worthy of an award, while those ranked lower are not.

== Cultural references ==
- In the film Brewster's Millions, the protagonist Brewster (played by Richard Pryor) is required, under certain conditions, to spend $30,000,000 in thirty days in order to inherit $300,000,000. After failing to lose money through gambling and inadvisable investments, he joins the race for Mayor of New York City and throws most of his money at a protest campaign urging voters to support None of the Above. The two major candidates sue Brewster for his confrontational rhetoric, leading to a massive settlement which of course furthers their competitor's goal. Brewster is forced to end his campaign when he learns that he is leading in the polls as a write-in candidate and has to publicly announce that he if he won the mayoralty he wants to decline it but is surprised his "None of the Above" campaign became so popular. (Under the conditions of the inheritance deal, Brewster was not permitted to permanently acquire any assets using the $30,000,000, with the Mayor of New York's $60,000 per annum salary being considered an asset.) Neither candidate wins the election, and a new election with different candidates must be held.
- In the sixth-season episode of Captain Planet called "Dirty Politics" three of the Eco-Villains are running for president and kidnap the fourth candidate, who is the most popular. Despite this over seventy percent vote None of the Above resulting in the need for a new election.
- L. Neil Smith's novel The Probability Broach has an alternate history in which the United States becomes a libertarian state after a successful Whiskey Rebellion and the overthrowing and execution of George Washington by firing squad for treason in 1794, where None of the Above (which is always an option on the ballot) has received the most votes for President of the North American Confederacy on two occasions. The first time was in 1968, defeating Lucy Kropotkin by only one vote and would serve until 1972 as the NAC's 24th President. The second time was in 2000 and again in 2004, being elected "President for Life" in 2008, serving as the 28th President and essentially abolishing the presidency.
- Wavy Gravy has run a "Nobody for President" campaign during several different election years in the United States.

== See also ==
- Absolutely Nobody
- Election boycott
- Motion of no confidence
- Refused ballot
- Tactical voting
