= Missouri Route 85 =

State highway in Missouri, U.S.

Route 85
- MO 85 highlighted in red

Route information
- Maintained by MoDOT
- Length: 3.966 mi (6.383 km)

Major junctions
- South end: Route A in Evona
- North end: US 136 in Albany

Location
- Country: United States
- State: Missouri

Highway system
- Missouri State Highway System; Interstate; US; State; Supplemental
← Route 84	→ Route 86

Route 85 is a short Missouri state highway in eastern Gentry County.

== Route description ==
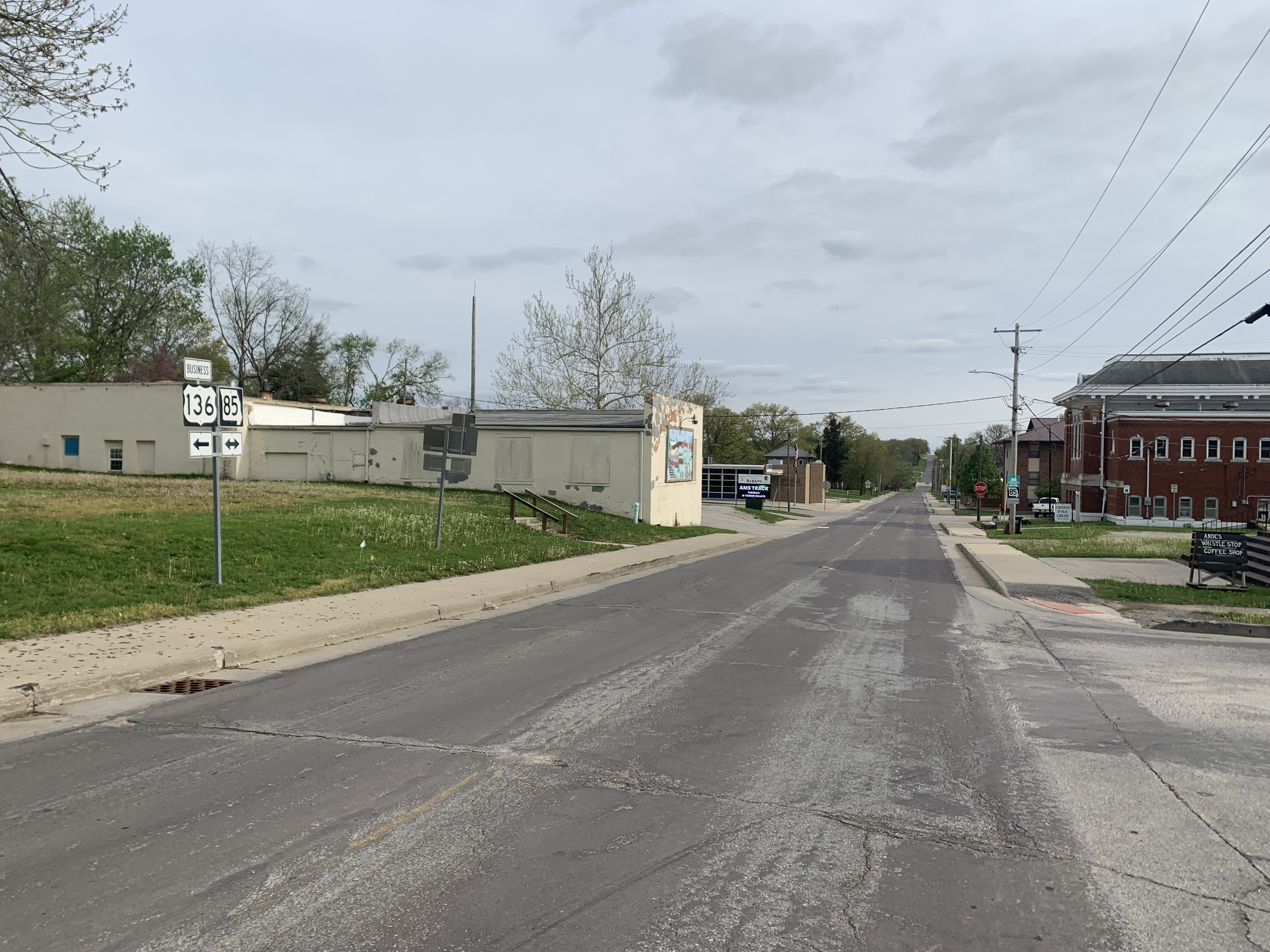
Route 85 at junction with Business US 136 in Albany, Missouri, facing south

Its northern terminus is at U.S. Route 136 in Albany; its southern terminus is at Evona where the highway becomes Route A. No other towns are on the route.

== Major intersections ==
The entire route is in Gentry County

County	Location	mi	km	Destinations	Notes
Gentry	Evona	0.000	0.000	Route A	
Gentry	Albany	3.414	5.494	US 136 Bus.	Southern end of US-Bus 136 overlap
Gentry	Albany	3.966	6.383	US 136 / US 136 Bus.	Northern end of US-Bus 136 overlap
1.000 mi = 1.609 km; 1.000 km = 0.621 mi: Concurrency terminus
