= Albany, Missouri =

City in Missouri, U.S.

- City and County Seat
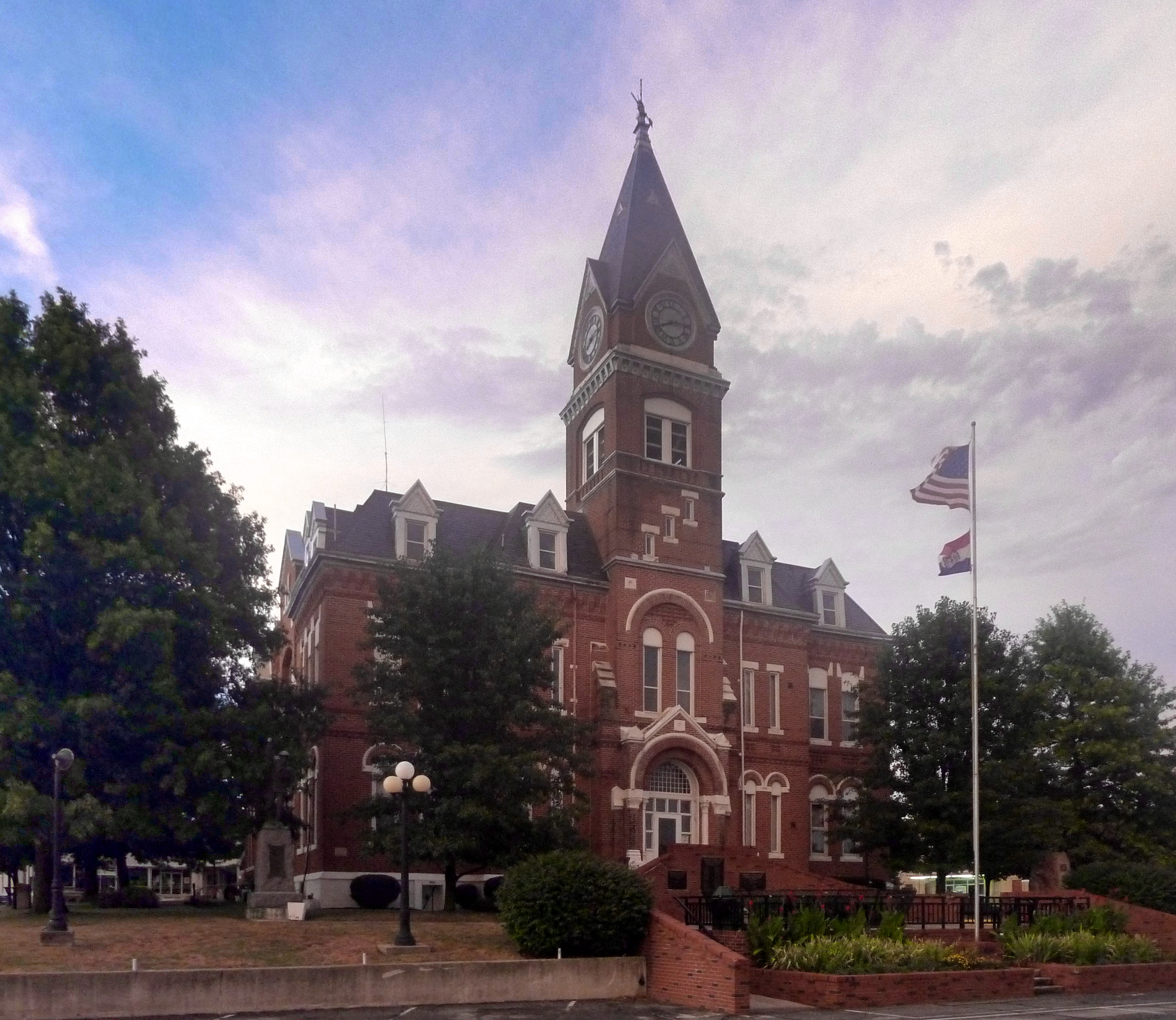
- Gentry County Courthouse, August 2010

- Location of Albany, Missouri
- Coordinates: 40°14′52″N 94°20′00″W
- Country: United States
- State: Missouri
- County: Gentry
- Township: Athens
- Incorporated: 1845

Area
  - Total: 2.44 sq mi (6.33 km^{2})
  - Land: 2.44 sq mi (6.33 km^{2})
  - Water: 0 sq mi (0.00 km^{2})
- Elevation: 899 ft (274 m)

Population (2020)
  - Total: 1,679
  - Density: 687.4/sq mi (265.41/km^{2})
- Time zone: UTC-6 (Central (CST))
  - Summer (DST): UTC-5 (CDT)
- ZIP code: 64402
- Area code: 660
- FIPS code: 29-00514
- GNIS feature ID: 2393899
- Website: albanymo.net

Albany is a city in and the county seat of Gentry County, Missouri, United States. It is also the largest city in Gentry County, with a population of 1,679 at the 2020 census.

== History ==
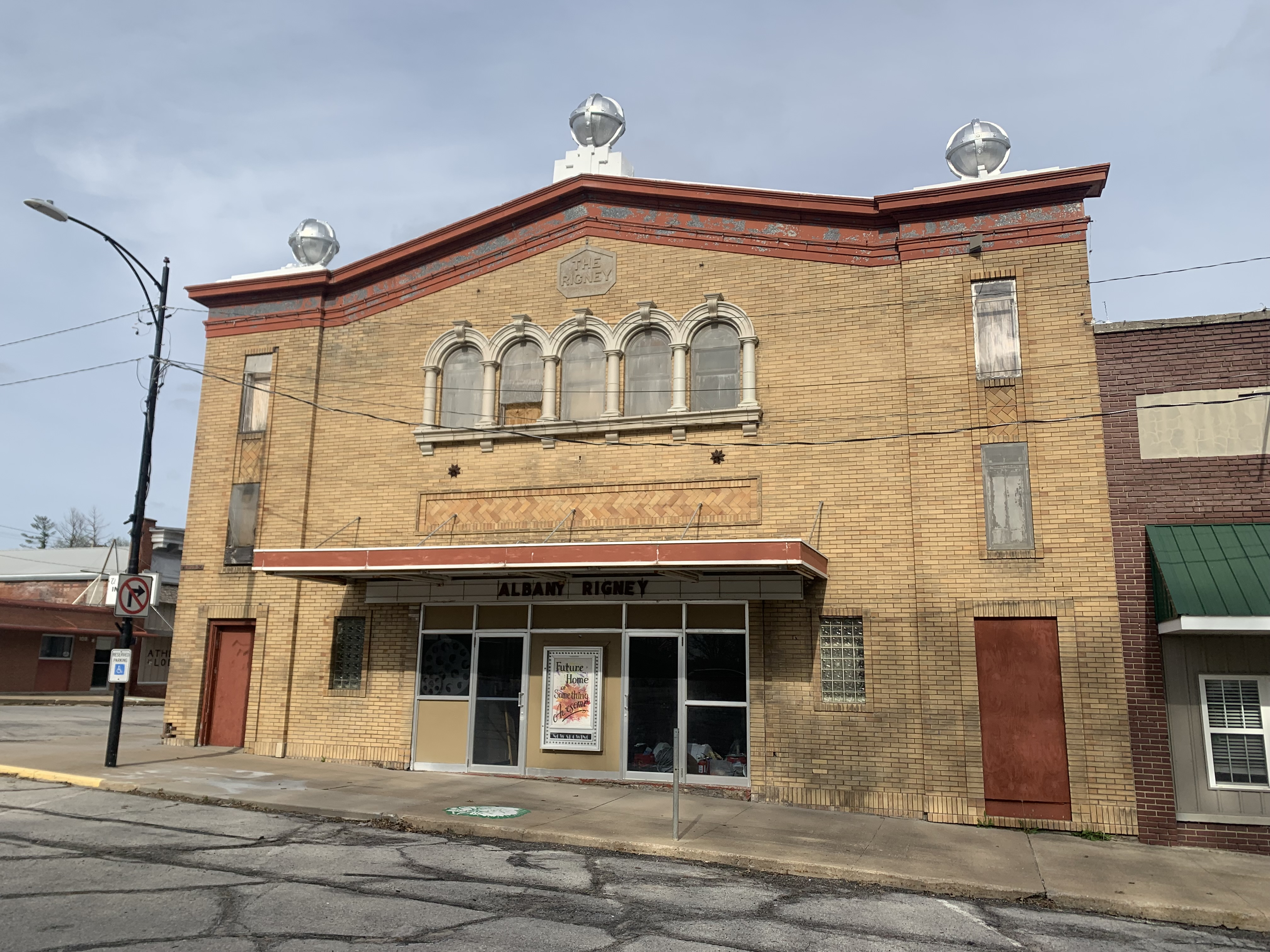
The Rigney Theatre in Albany, April 2025

Albany was originally called Athens, and under the latter name was platted in 1845. The present name is a transfer from Albany, New York, the native home of a local judge. A post office called Albany has been in operation since 1857.

The Albany Carnegie Public Library, Gentry County Courthouse, and Samuel and Pauline Peery House are listed on the National Register of Historic Places.

== Demographics ==
Historical population
Census	Pop.	Note	%±
1860	476		—
1870	607		27.5%
1880	979		61.3%
1890	1,334		36.3%
1900	2,025		51.8%
1910	1,922		−5.1%
1920	2,016		4.9%
1930	1,858		−7.8%
1940	2,010		8.2%
1950	1,850		−8.0%
1960	1,662		−10.2%
1970	1,804		8.5%
1980	2,152		19.3%
1990	1,958		−9.0%
2000	1,937		−1.1%
2010	1,730		−10.7%
2020	1,679		−2.9%
U.S. Decennial Census

=== 2020 census ===
As of the 2020 census, Albany had a population of 1,679. The median age was 42.4 years. 23.7% of residents were under the age of 18 and 21.7% of residents were 65 years of age or older. For every 100 females there were 92.3 males, and for every 100 females age 18 and over there were 89.2 males age 18 and over.

0.0% of residents lived in urban areas, while 100.0% lived in rural areas.

There were 756 households in Albany, of which 25.8% had children under the age of 18 living in them. Of all households, 42.5% were married-couple households, 20.1% were households with a male householder and no spouse or partner present, and 32.7% were households with a female householder and no spouse or partner present. About 39.6% of all households were made up of individuals and 18.7% had someone living alone who was 65 years of age or older.

There were 834 housing units, of which 9.4% were vacant. The homeowner vacancy rate was 3.4% and the rental vacancy rate was 11.0%.

Racial composition as of the 2020 census
Race	Number	Percent
White	1,577	93.9%
Black or African American	1	0.1%
American Indian and Alaska Native	2	0.1%
Asian	2	0.1%
Native Hawaiian and Other Pacific Islander	1	0.1%
Some other race	21	1.3%
Two or more races	75	4.5%
Hispanic or Latino (of any race)	35	2.1%

=== 2010 census ===
As of the census of 2010, there were 1,730 people, 753 households, and 446 families living in the city. The population density was 709.0 inhabitants per square mile (273.7/km^{2}). There were 880 housing units at an average density of 360.7 per square mile (139.3/km^{2}). The racial makeup of the city was 98.2% White, 0.5% African American, 0.3% Native American, 0.5% Asian, 0.2% from other races, and 0.5% from two or more races. Hispanic or Latino of any race were 0.6% of the population.

There were 753 households, of which 26.2% had children under the age of 18 living with them, 45.6% were married couples living together, 10.1% had a female householder with no husband present, 3.6% had a male householder with no wife present, and 40.8% were non-families. 35.7% of all households were made up of individuals, and 18.8% had someone living alone who was 65 years of age or older. The average household size was 2.21 and the average family size was 2.87.

The median age in the city was 44.1 years. 21.6% of residents were under the age of 18; 7.3% were between the ages of 18 and 24; 22.1% were from 25 to 44; 26% were from 45 to 64; and 22.9% were 65 years of age or older. The gender makeup of the city was 45.8% male and 54.2% female.

=== 2000 census ===
As of the census of 2000, there were 1,937 people, 858 households, and 515 families living in the city. The population density was 790.6 inhabitants per square mile (305.3/km^{2}). There were 948 housing units at an average density of 386.9 per square mile (149.4/km^{2}). The racial makeup of the city was 99.07% White, 0.05% African American, 0.21% Native American, 0.10% Asian, 0.05% from other races, and 0.52% from two or more races. Hispanic or Latino of any race were 0.31% of the population.

There were 858 households, out of which 26.1% had children under the age of 18 living with them, 48.8% were married couples living together, 8.2% had a female householder with no husband present, and 39.9% were non-families. 37.2% of all households were made up of individuals, and 23.3% had someone living alone who was 65 years of age or older. The average household size was 2.18 and the average family size was 2.87.

In the city the population was spread out, with 22.2% under the age of 18, 7.3% from 18 to 24, 22.7% from 25 to 44, 22.3% from 45 to 64, and 25.6% who were 65 years of age or older. The median age was 44 years. For every 100 females, there were 88.8 males. For every 100 females age 18 and over, there were 84.5 males.

The median income for a household in the city was $25,912, and the median income for a family was $36,042. Males had a median income of $24,321 versus $21,813 for females. The per capita income for the city was $17,552. About 9.8% of families and 11.1% of the population were below the poverty line, including 10.8% of those under age 18 and 10.8% of those age 65 or over.

== Geography ==
Albany is located at the intersection of US Route 136 and Missouri Route 85. Stanberry is eleven miles to the west and Bethany is about 14 miles to the east in Harrison County.

According to the United States Census Bureau, the city has a total area of 2.44 square miles (6.32 km^{2}), all land.

Two creeks surround the town, with Weldon Branch passing westward north of the town, and Town Branch crossing westerly across the southern reaches of Albany before its confluence with the East Fork Grand River. The East Fork of the Grand River flows southerly to the west of Albany and joins the Grand River three miles south of the city.

=== Climate ===
Situated in a transitional climate area, Albany has a humid continental climate (Köppen climate classification Dfa) with hot, humid summers and cold winters.

Climate data for Albany, Missouri (1991–2020 normals, extremes 1941–present)
Month	Jan	Feb	Mar	Apr	May	Jun	Jul	Aug	Sep	Oct	Nov	Dec	Year
Record high °F (°C)	68 (20)	78 (26)	89 (32)	93 (34)	101 (38)	103 (39)	109 (43)	106 (41)	104 (40)	96 (36)	80 (27)	74 (23)	109 (43)
Mean daily maximum °F (°C)	34.7 (1.5)	40.0 (4.4)	52.5 (11.4)	63.4 (17.4)	74.0 (23.3)	83.8 (28.8)	88.1 (31.2)	87.0 (30.6)	79.4 (26.3)	67.0 (19.4)	52.1 (11.2)	39.3 (4.1)	63.4 (17.4)
Daily mean °F (°C)	24.5 (−4.2)	29.3 (−1.5)	40.9 (4.9)	51.5 (10.8)	62.9 (17.2)	73.0 (22.8)	77.4 (25.2)	75.4 (24.1)	67.1 (19.5)	54.6 (12.6)	40.9 (4.9)	29.7 (−1.3)	52.3 (11.3)
Mean daily minimum °F (°C)	14.4 (−9.8)	18.7 (−7.4)	29.3 (−1.5)	39.6 (4.2)	51.8 (11.0)	62.1 (16.7)	66.6 (19.2)	63.8 (17.7)	54.8 (12.7)	42.2 (5.7)	29.8 (−1.2)	20.2 (−6.6)	41.1 (5.1)
Record low °F (°C)	−27 (−33)	−21 (−29)	−23 (−31)	10 (−12)	27 (−3)	35 (2)	43 (6)	37 (3)	25 (−4)	13 (−11)	−9 (−23)	−21 (−29)	−27 (−33)
Average precipitation inches (mm)	1.07 (27)	1.15 (29)	2.10 (53)	3.64 (92)	5.68 (144)	5.71 (145)	4.06 (103)	3.95 (100)	4.07 (103)	2.72 (69)	1.83 (46)	1.50 (38)	37.48 (952)
Average precipitation days (≥ 0.01 in)	5.8	5.5	7.6	10.0	12.0	9.9	8.3	8.2	7.3	8.6	4.9	5.5	93.6
Source: NOAA

== Education ==
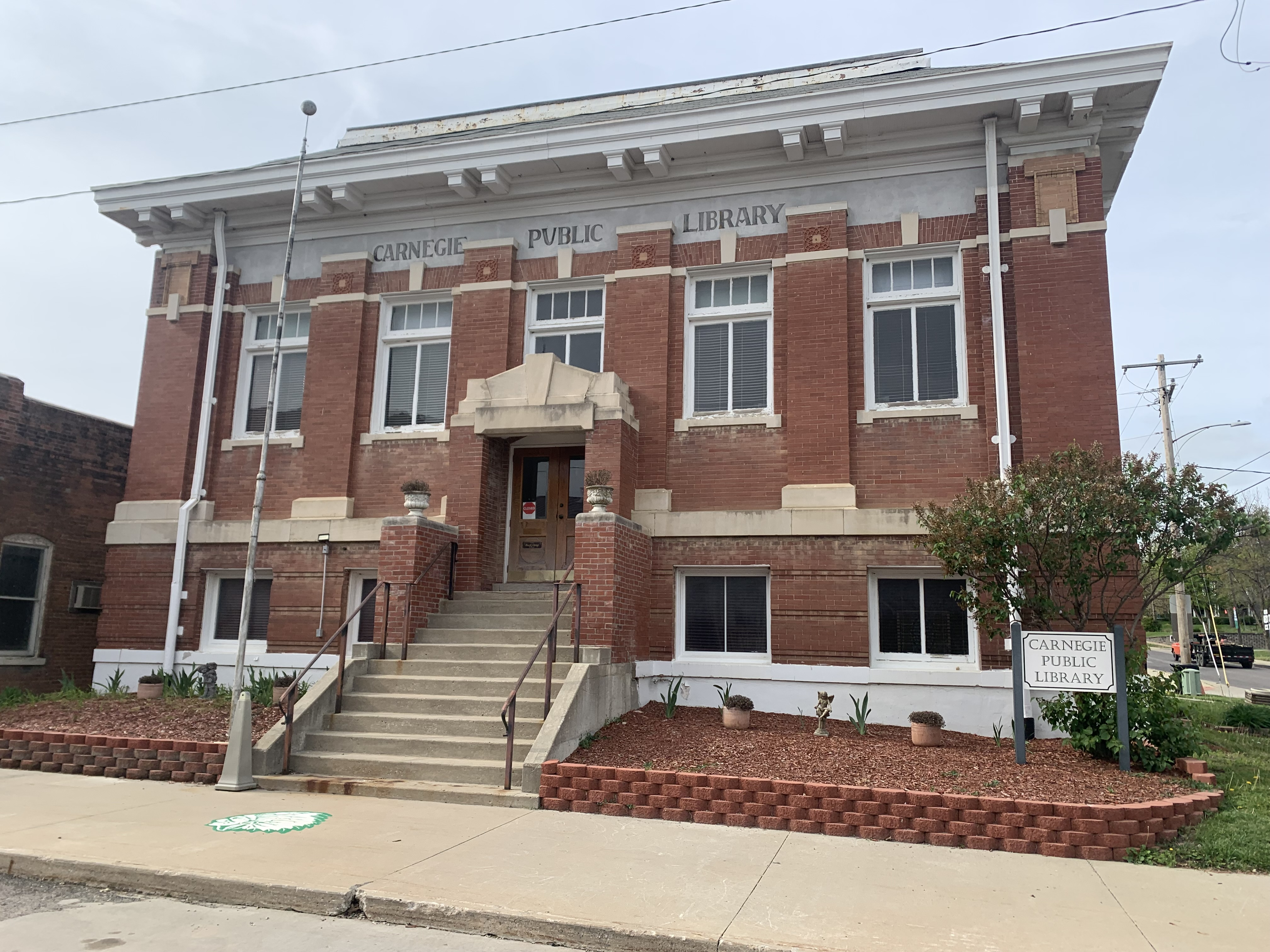
Albany Library, April 2025

The Albany R-III School District operates the Virginia E. George Elementary School, as well as Albany Middle School & High School.

The town has a lending library, the Carnegie Library of Albany.

== Notable people ==
- Alice Drew Chenoweth, American physician
- Moose Clabaugh, American professional baseball player
- Daisy Coleman, Sexual assault victim advocate
- Cora Alta Ray Corniea, American conservationist
- Joe Deal, American photographer
- George Flamank, Football and basketball player and coach
- John S. Murray, Washington state politician
- John Twist, American screenwriter and film producer

== See also ==
- List of cities in Missouri
- List of county seats in Missouri
