= Carnegie Library of Albany (Albany, Missouri) =

Historic library in Albany, Missouri, United States

- Albany Carnegie Public Library
- U.S. National Register of Historic Places
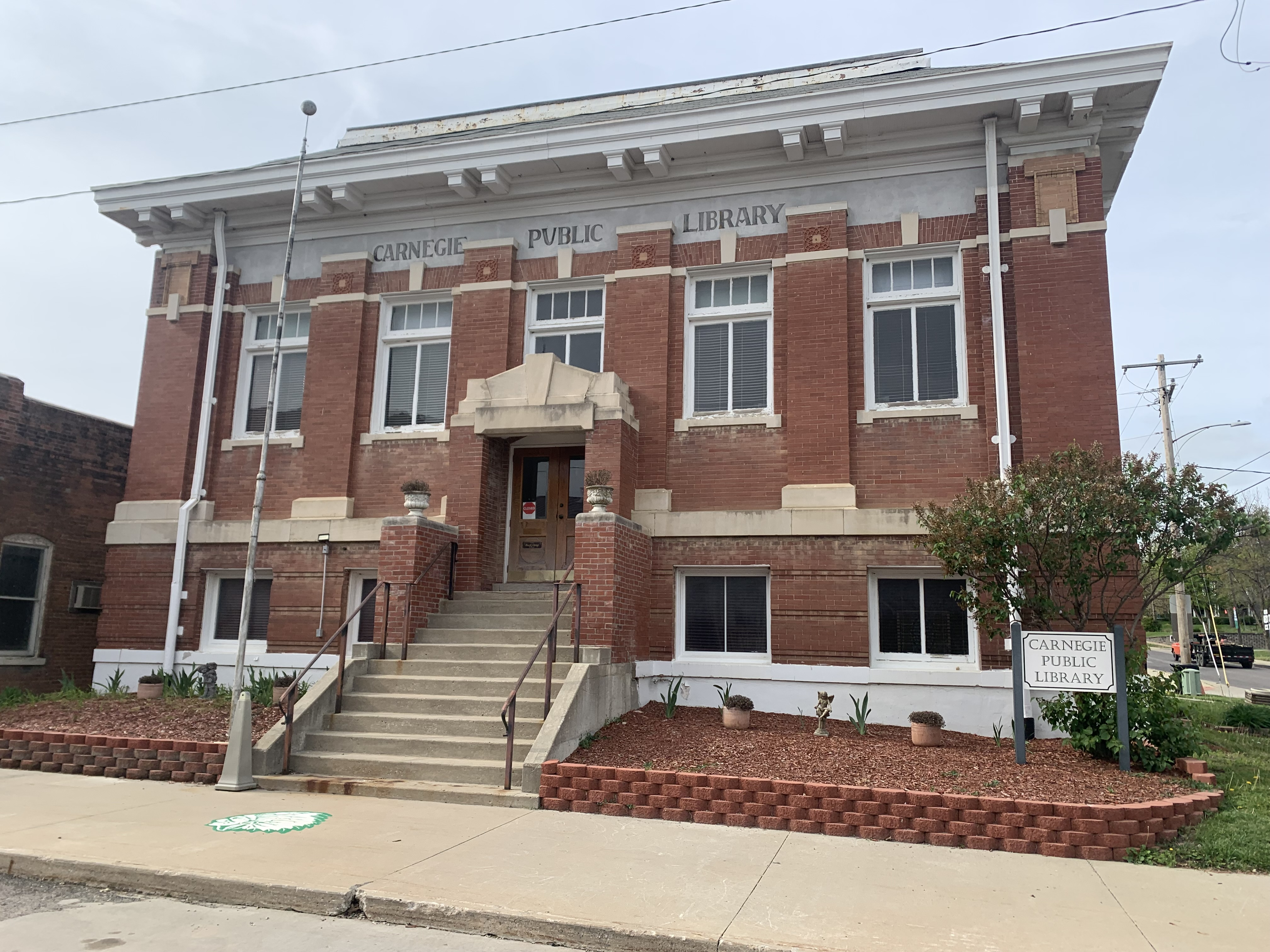
- Library in April 2025

- Location within Missouri
- Location: 101 W. Clay St. Albany, Missouri
- Coordinates: 40.2479°N 94.3319°W
- Built: 1906
- Architect: Edmond J. Eckel
- NRHP reference No.: 90000130
- Added to NRHP: February 23, 1990

The Carnegie Library of Albany is a Carnegie library in Albany, Missouri, United States, that is listed on the National Register of Historic Places. It was designed by Edmond J. Eckel and opened in 1906.

== History ==
The city of Albany had a subscription library which operated from 1885 to about 1890. Because of renewed interested in having a public library, a grant was requested from Andrew Carnegie. A pledge of $10,000 was made on June 2, 1903, and a lot was purchased in July 1904. The building was designed by Edmond J. Eckel. After requesting bids in November 1905, Louis Walin was selected. The final bid was $9,071, which required further grant money from Carnegie, bringing the total donation to $12,500. The library opened to the public on March 1, 1906.

The library basement housed city hall from 1939 until the mid-1960s, and then the University of Missouri Extension Office. The building continues to serve as a library in Albany.

The library was nominated for inclusion on the National Register of Historic Places under Criterion A for its significance in social history as a Carnegie Library and Criterion C for its architecture. The library was listed on the National Register on February 23, 1990, as the "Albany Carnegie Public Library".

== See also ==
- National Register of Historic Places listings in Gentry County, Missouri
- List of Carnegie libraries in Missouri
