= Edison, Nebraska =

- Village
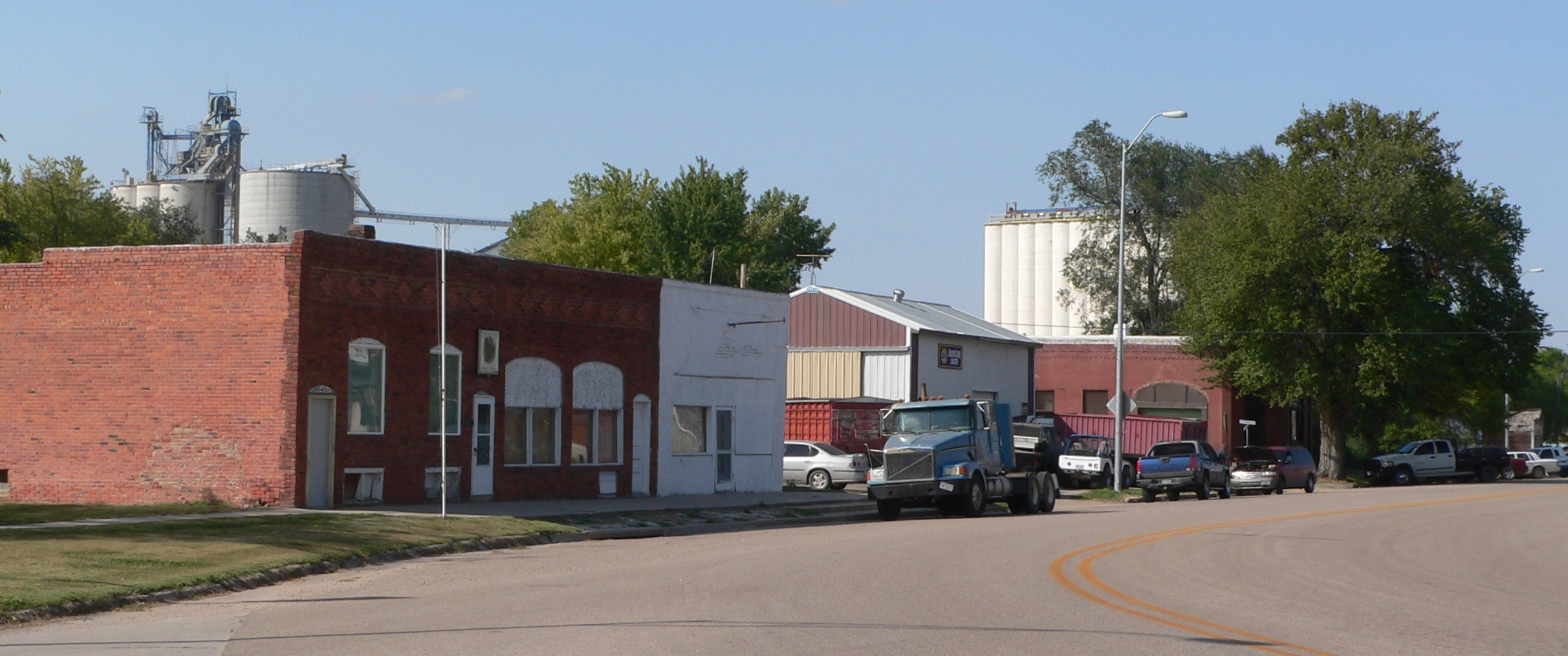
- Downtown Edison: Main Avenue

- Location of Edison, Nebraska
- Coordinates: 40°16′45″N 99°46′33″W
- Country: United States
- State: Nebraska
- County: Furnas

Area
  - Total: 0.37 sq mi (0.97 km^{2})
  - Land: 0.37 sq mi (0.97 km^{2})
  - Water: 0 sq mi (0.00 km^{2})
- Elevation: 2,116 ft (645 m)

Population (2020)
  - Total: 111
  - Density: 295.1/sq mi (113.94/km^{2})
- Time zone: UTC-6 (Central (CST))
  - Summer (DST): UTC-5 (CDT)
- ZIP code: 68936
- Area code: 308
- FIPS code: 31-14520
- GNIS feature ID: 2398788

Edison is a village in Furnas County, Nebraska, United States. As of the 2020 census, Edison had a population of 111.

== History ==
The first post office in Edison was established in 1880, and was named for Edward "Eddie" Rohr, the postmaster's son. Edison was incorporated as a village in 1907.

== Geography ==
According to the United States Census Bureau, the village has a total area of 0.27 square miles (0.70 km^{2}), all land.

=== Climate ===
Climate data for Edison, Nebraska (1991-2020)
Month	Jan	Feb	Mar	Apr	May	Jun	Jul	Aug	Sep	Oct	Nov	Dec	Year
Mean daily maximum °F (°C)	40.8 (4.9)	44.8 (7.1)	54.8 (12.7)	64.7 (18.2)	73.9 (23.3)	84.7 (29.3)	89.1 (31.7)	87.2 (30.7)	80.9 (27.2)	67.6 (19.8)	53.9 (12.2)	41.5 (5.3)	65.3 (18.5)
Daily mean °F (°C)	28.2 (−2.1)	31.0 (−0.6)	40.3 (4.6)	49.8 (9.9)	60.2 (15.7)	71.1 (21.7)	75.7 (24.3)	73.7 (23.2)	65.1 (18.4)	51.5 (10.8)	38.5 (3.6)	28.6 (−1.9)	51.1 (10.6)
Mean daily minimum °F (°C)	15.6 (−9.1)	17.1 (−8.3)	25.7 (−3.5)	34.9 (1.6)	46.5 (8.1)	57.4 (14.1)	62.4 (16.9)	60.3 (15.7)	49.3 (9.6)	35.4 (1.9)	23.0 (−5.0)	15.8 (−9.0)	37.0 (2.8)
Average precipitation inches (mm)	0.46 (12)	0.59 (15)	1.26 (32)	2.41 (61)	3.52 (89)	3.77 (96)	4.37 (111)	3.17 (81)	1.90 (48)	1.86 (47)	0.71 (18)	0.76 (19)	24.78 (629)
Average snowfall inches (cm)	3.1 (7.9)	6.1 (15)	1.8 (4.6)	0.7 (1.8)	trace	0.0 (0.0)	0.0 (0.0)	0.0 (0.0)	0.0 (0.0)	0.2 (0.51)	1.3 (3.3)	5.2 (13)	18.4 (46.11)
Average extreme snow depth inches (cm)	4 (10)	5 (13)	2 (5.1)	1 (2.5)	0 (0)	0 (0)	0 (0)	0 (0)	0 (0)	0 (0)	1 (2.5)	3 (7.6)	5 (13)
Average precipitation days (≥ 0.01 in)	4.1	4.9	6.4	8.6	12.5	11.1	9.6	9.8	7.2	7.0	3.9	5.2	90.3
Average snowy days (≥ 0.1 in)	2	3	1	1	0	0	0	0	0	0	1	3	11
Source: NOAA (snow and snow depth 2005-2023)

== Demographics ==
Historical population
Census	Pop.	Note	%±
1910	334		—
1920	315		−5.7%
1930	329		4.4%
1940	321		−2.4%
1950	302		−5.9%
1960	249		−17.5%
1970	199		−20.1%
1980	210		5.5%
1990	148		−29.5%
2000	154		4.1%
2010	133		−13.6%
2020	111		−16.5%
U.S. Decennial Census

=== 2010 census ===
As of the census of 2010, there were 133 people, 60 households, and 36 families residing in the village. The population density was 492.6 inhabitants per square mile (190.2/km^{2}). There were 84 housing units at an average density of 311.1 per square mile (120.1/km^{2}). The racial makeup of the village was 97.7% White, 0.8% Native American, 0.8% Pacific Islander, and 0.8% from two or more races. Hispanic or Latino of any race were 0.8% of the population.

There were 60 households, of which 26.7% had children under the age of 18 living with them, 51.7% were married couples living together, 5.0% had a female householder with no husband present, 3.3% had a male householder with no wife present, and 40.0% were non-families. 35.0% of all households were made up of individuals, and 10% had someone living alone who was 65 years of age or older. The average household size was 2.22 and the average family size was 2.89.

The median age in the village was 45.4 years. 22.6% of residents were under the age of 18; 4.5% were between the ages of 18 and 24; 21.1% were from 25 to 44; 35.4% were from 45 to 64; and 16.5% were 65 years of age or older. The gender makeup of the village was 57.1% male and 42.9% female.

=== 2000 census ===
As of the census of 2000, there were 154 people, 66 households, and 46 families residing in the village. The population density was 594.4 inhabitants per square mile (229.5/km^{2}). There were 89 housing units at an average density of 343.5 per square mile (132.6/km^{2}). The racial makeup of the village was 100.00% White.

There were 66 households, out of which 27.3% had children under the age of 18 living with them, 60.6% were married couples living together, 7.6% had a female householder with no husband present, and 28.8% were non-families. 25.8% of all households were made up of individuals, and 16.7% had someone living alone who was 65 years of age or older. The average household size was 2.33 and the average family size was 2.83.

In the village, the population was spread out, with 22.7% under the age of 18, 6.5% from 18 to 24, 27.9% from 25 to 44, 26.6% from 45 to 64, and 16.2% who were 65 years of age or older. The median age was 40 years. For every 100 females, there were 85.5 males. For every 100 females age 18 and over, there were 88.9 males.

As of 2000 the median income for a household in the village was $24,250, and the median income for a family was $26,875. Males had a median income of $19,375 versus $25,938 for females. The per capita income for the village was $15,330. None of the families and 1.4% of the population were living below the poverty line, including no under eighteens and 8.0% of those over 64.
