= John S. Murray (Washington politician) =

American politician (1925–2007)

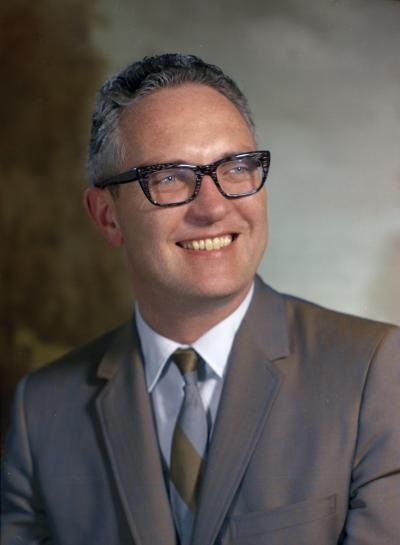
- Murray in 1967

Member of the Washington Senate from the 36th district
- In office January 11, 1971 – January 8, 1979
- Preceded by: Joel Pritchard
- Succeeded by: Ray Moore

Member of the Washington House of Representatives from the 36th district
- In office January 9, 1967 – January 11, 1971
- Preceded by: Joel Pritchard
- Succeeded by: Ken Eikenberry

Personal details
- Born: John Staton Murray; August 18, 1925 Albany, Missouri, U.S.
- Died: October 17, 2007 (aged 82) Seattle, Washington, U.S.
- Party: Republican
- Education: University of Washington
- Occupation: newspaper publisher

John S. Murray (August 18, 1925 – October 17, 2007) was an American politician in the state of Washington. He served in the Washington House of Representatives from 1967 to 1971 and in the state Senate from 1971 to 1979. He was also a newspaper publisher, owner of the Murray Publishing Company.

== Biography ==
John Staton Murray was born in Albany, Missouri on August 18, 1925 to Geoffrey and Cecil Murray. He moved with his family to Seattle at the age of 12.

During World War II, Murray served in the US Army in Europe. After returning to the States in 1946, he completed his education at the University of Washington, graduating in 1948.

Murray was a newspaper publisher, purchasing his first paper, The Queen Anne News in 1953. He built it into a publishing company, Murray Publishing Company, that ran several small community papers, including the Magnolia News and the Issaquah Press, as well as the Argus. He also published Washington's first Vietnamese and Norwegian newspapers. He was a member of the Washington Newspaper Publishers Association and served as its president. In 1988, Murray retired and sold the publishing company to Tom Haley of the Pacific Publishing Company.

Murray served in the Washington State legislature for twelve (12) years — first as a representative to the state House for four years (1967-1971), then in the state Senate for eight years (1971-1979).

Murray died at his home in Seattle on October 17, 2007, at the age of 82. He was survived by his second wife, a brother, and his first wife and their four children.
