= Alice Drew Chenoweth =

American physician

Alice Drew Chenoweth (1903–1998) was an American physician who specialized in pediatrics and public health, and served as the Chief of the Division of Health Services in the United States Children's Bureau.

Earlier, Chenoweth was Director of Maternal and Child Health at the Department of Health of Kentucky. Her work in Kentucky drew national recognition, and she joined the U. S. Children's Bureau as a research pediatrician, and later moved to the Children's Bureau's International Division, before becoming the Chief of the Division of Health Services in the United States Children's Bureau.

== Early life and education ==
Alice Drew was born and raised in Albany, Missouri. In 1924 she graduated from Northwestern University with a degree in chemistry. And continued there to earn a master's degree at Northwestern in history in 1926. After graduation, she joined the faculty of a women's college in Montgomery, Alabama, and taught there for two years. Despite her father concerns about her being a physician, Drew enrolled in medical school, and graduated from Vanderbilt Medical School in 1932.

After completing her medical degree, Drew did a pediatrics internship at Strong Memorial Hospital, the teaching arm of the University of Rochester School of Medicine and Dentistry in New York. In 1933 she began a residency at the Johns Hopkins University School of Medicine in Baltimore, Maryland.

== Medical career ==
Chenoweth was Director of Maternal and Child Health at the Department of Health of Kentucky. Her work in Kentucky drew national recognition, and she joined the U.S. Children's Bureau as a research pediatrician and later moved to the Children's Bureau's International Division. Eventually, she served as the Chief of the Division of Health Services in the United States Children's Bureau.
