= Evona, Missouri =

Extinct hamlet in Missouri, U.S.

Coordinates: 40°11′52″N 94°19′45″W

Evona is an extinct hamlet in Gentry County, Missouri, United States.

== History ==
Evona was platted in 1879 on the Wabash Railroad. The name Evona was sourced by railroad officials. A post office was established at Evona in 1880, and remained in operation until 1935. Nothing extant remains of the settlement.

== See also ==
- Missouri Route 85
