= Weldon Branch =

Stream in northwest Missouri

Coordinates: 40°15′57″N 94°21′34″W

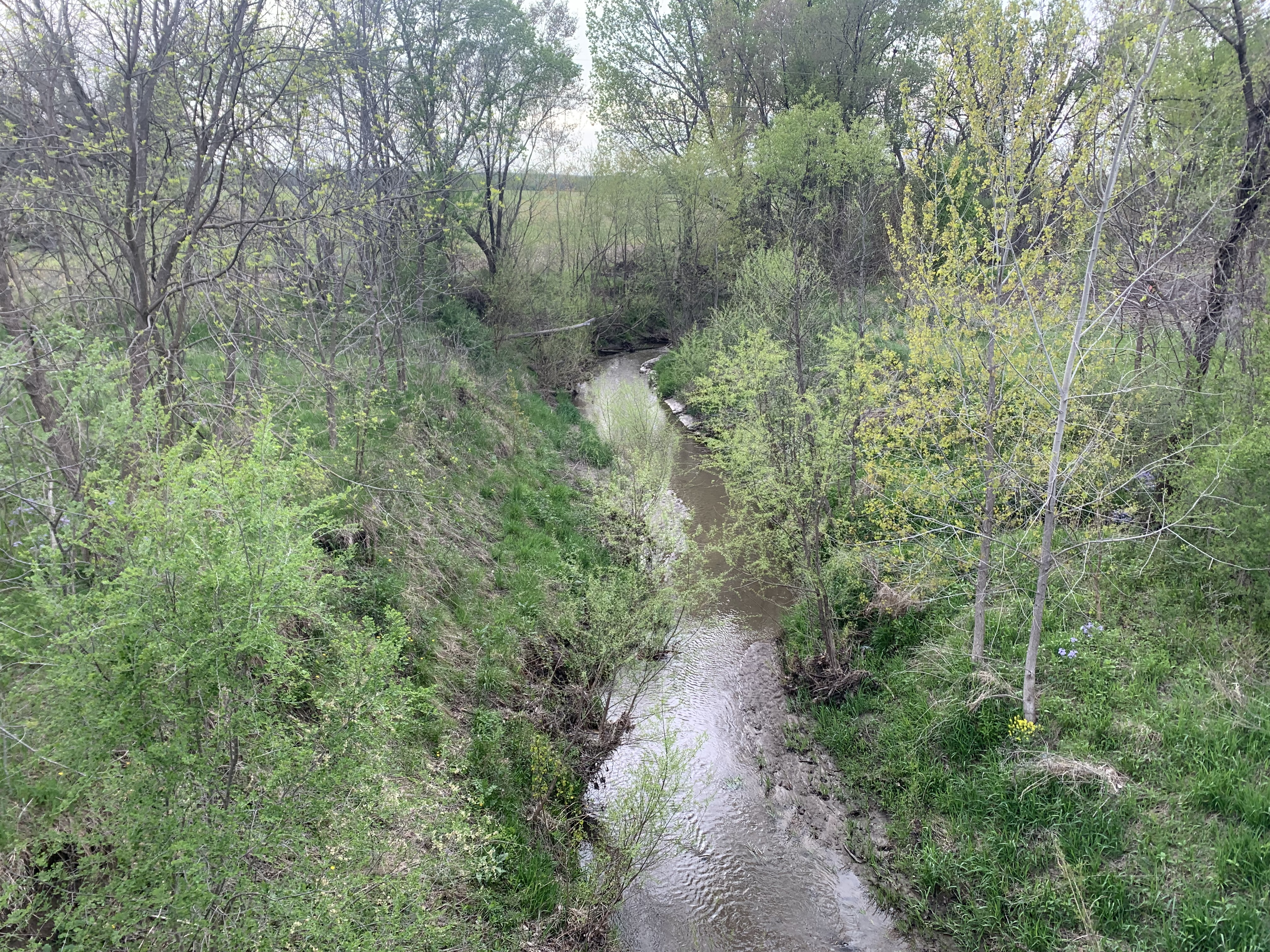
Weldon Branch at Highway C branch in Athens Township

Weldon Branch is a stream in Gentry County in the U.S. state of Missouri. It is a tributary of the East Fork Grand River.

Weldon Branch has the name of John Weldon, an early settler.

== See also ==
- List of rivers of Missouri
