= Absolutely Nobody =

American politician

Nominee for Lieutenant Governor of Washington
- Election date 1992

Absolutely Nobody (1955 or 1956-October 26, 1993) was a political candidate in the U.S. state of Washington. He received almost seven percent of the vote for Lieutenant Governor of Washington in 1992, the same year independent candidate Ross Perot received nearly a quarter of the vote for U.S. President. The candidate's name was originally David M. Powers before he changed it in 1991, and he worked as a manager at Winchell's Donuts in Seattle. He died in Oakland, California, on October 26, 1993, of complications from AIDS.
