= Joseph Franklin Dye =

American forty-niner

Joseph Franklin Dye (c. 1831–1891) was an American forty-niner and alleged member of the Mason Henry Gang. He was also a rancher and early oilman in Southern California.

== Early life ==
Joseph Franklin Dye was born in Union County, Kentucky in about 1831 as one of 16 children in a family that later settled in Texas. In 1849, he and two of his brothers came west in the California Gold Rush but returned the next year. In 1853 following his father's death, Joe Dye left the family farm and worked for several years as a miner and mule team driver various places in the Southwest. In that first year, he shot a man while in Santa Fe, wounding him in the neck during a fight over a card game.

From March 17, 1860 Joseph F. Dye ran the Butterfield Overland Mail station and was the postmaster at Casa Blanca, Arizona until October 1861 when the post office was discontinued. In 1864 the territorial census found him living in Tucson.

On January 27, 1864, he was with a party of settlers and Maricopa Indians under King Woolsey in Arizona Territory, chasing a band of Tonto Apache horse thieves when he was involved in the incident known as the Massacre at Bloody Tanks near Miami, Arizona

== Bushwacker or Outlaw ==
Toward the end of the Civil War, Joe Dye was in California. As a dedicated secessionist, he was reputed to have joined the Mason Henry Gang along with his friend John Rogers. This gang of bushwackers, formed in 1864, soon turned outlaw with two murders committed at Elkhorn Station. Chased out of central California under pressure from the Union Army and Sheriff John Hicks Adams of San Jose, they moved into Southern California and split up after the end of the Civil War in April 1865, James Henry with part of the gang moved into the eastern San Gabriel Mountains at San Sevaine Flats from which they began rustling, committing robbery and murder as they did. In September of that year, he and his associates were camped out south of San Bernardino and sent John Rogers to the town to obtain provisions. While there, Rogers visited Whiskey Point, became drunk and started boasting about his outlaw connections. Locals of Union sympathies took note and sent for San Bernardino County Sheriff Benjamin Franklin Mathews. Rogers soon found himself in the company of the Sheriff and his posse, leading them to the outlaw camp in Santa Jacinto Canyon. There James Henry died alone in a fusillade of bullets. However Joe Dye was not there, perhaps like many others having given up the lost cause or leaving the gang for its behavior or merely being away at the time.

== Lawman ==
After the war in 1866, William Rubottom, a Deputy Los Angeles County Sheriff for El Monte, hired his friend Joe Dye as a special deputy to track down two thieves who had taken horses and a wagon from the Rancho Santa Gertrudes of former Governor John G. Downey. Although the two had an eight-day lead, Dye pursued them across the Mojave Desert toward Salt Lake City. After getting fresh horses and a guide from Camp Cady, he succeeded in capturing them before they left California, gaining a reward from Downey, and a reputation. In 1867, Los Angeles City Marshal William C. Warren, impressed with Dye's tracking and shooting skills, hired Dye to patrol the gambling halls, saloons and bordellos of the city's Chinatown. Successful in this assignment Dye was appointed a Special Police Officer December 21, 1868. On December 9, 1869, he was appointed as one of Warren's six Police Officers for the City of Los Angeles. However a fatal dispute arose in 1870:

During the second marshalship of William C. Warren, when Joe Dye was one of his deputy officers, there was great traffic in Chinese women, one of whom was kidnapped and carried off to San Diego. A reward of a hundred dollars was offered for her return, and she was brought back on a charge of theft and tried in the Court of Justice Trafford, on Temple Street near Spring. During the trial, on October 31, 1870, Warren and Dye fell into a dispute as to the reward; and the quarrel was renewed outside the courtroom. At a spot near the corner of Spring and Temple streets Dye shot and killed Warren; and in the scrimmage several other persons standing near were wounded. Dye was tried, but acquitted.

== Later life ==
Losing his job as Deputy Marshal and in fear of vigilante justice, Dye moved to a ranch in eastern Santa Barbara County (now Ventura County) and got into the oil business that was beginning in the Sespe oil field. He took on a nephew, Mason Bradfield as a partner. After they fell out over an oil claim, Dye conducted a campaign of death threats and intimidation against Bradfield and his partners.

Later, however, he himself was killed by ... , Mason Bradfield, whose life he had frequently threatened and who fired the deadly bullet from a window of the New Arlington Hotel, formerly the White House, at the southeast comer of Commercial and Los Angeles streets.
