= Rufus Henry Ingram =

American outlaw

- Born: c. 1834
- Disappeared: July 15, 1864/65
- Died: Unknown
- Occupation: Bushwhacker
- Known for: Fugitive from justice who disappeared
- Criminal charge(s): Robbery, shootout
- Criminal status: Never captured

Rufus Henry Ingram (c. 1834–unknown) was a bushwhacker who led Captain Ingram's Partisan Rangers that operated in California in 1864.

== Background ==
In early 1864, Rufus Henry Ingram arrived in Santa Clara County with a Confederate commission as captain and with a former undersheriff of Monterey County, Tom Poole, organized about fifty local Knights of the Golden Circle and commanded them in what became known as Captain Ingram's Partisan Rangers. Finding difficulty in raising funds to purchase supplies for his unit, Ingram first planned a raid on San Jose to rob its banks and stores in the manner of Quantrill's raid on Lawrence. A quarrel within the band, however, led to the exposure of the plan to the local sheriff and it was abandoned.

Soon after, Ingram decided to rob shipments of silver from the Comstock Lode to Sacramento. On June 30, Ingram, along with a small detachment, robbed two stagecoaches eleven miles east of Placerville of their gold and silver, leaving a letter explaining they were not bandits but carrying out a military operation to raise funds for the Confederacy. During the pursuit of his fleeing band, the posse had a gunfight with two lawmen at the Somerset House. One of the posse, Deputy Sheriff Joseph Staples was killed, while Poole was wounded and left to be captured. After a two-day chase the Placerville posse lost their trail and they got to Santa Clara County a week later. Tom Poole gave a complete confession, the bullion was recovered and he exposed his companions' identities. They evaded the search for them in Santa Clara County.

== Disappearance ==
On July 15, an attempt by Ingram to rob the New Almaden Quicksilver Mine payroll failed, ending in a shootout with the posse of Santa Clara County Sheriff John Hicks Adams a mile and a half outside San Jose on the Almaden road. Two of Ingram's men were killed, while one of his men was wounded. The sheriff and his deputy were also wounded in the shootout. Ingram fled California for Missouri and was never captured afterwards.

== See also ==
- List of fugitives from justice who disappeared
