= John Hicks Adams =

American politician (1820–1878)

Sheriff of Santa Clara County
- In office 1871–1875
- In office February 6, 1864 – 1870

Personal details
- Born: 1820 Edwardsville, Illinois, U.S.
- Died: 1878 (aged 57–58) Arizona Territory, U.S.
- Cause of death: Homicide from blunt force trauma

John Hicks Adams (1820–1878) was an American 49er of the California Gold Rush and sheriff of Santa Clara County between 1864 and 1870, and again between 1871 and 1875. He was also Deputy United States Marshal for the Arizona Territory 1878, and a noted gunslinger.

== Early life ==
John Hicks Adams was born in the then newly-founded town of Edwardsville, Illinois, on June 13, 1820. His father, John Adams Sr., was elected sheriff of Madison County in 1838. John Jr., was appointed deputy sheriff; his duties included collecting taxes and taking care of court business. In December 1841, John Hicks married Mathilda Pomeroy. Their first child, May Hanna, was born one year later on December 21, 1842.

In May 1847, during the Mexican–American War, Adams joined Company J, 5th Regiment of the Illinois Volunteers. During the march south, the commander of his company, Captain Niles, died and Hicks was promoted to Captain of Company J, the rank he continued to maintain throughout his year and half of active duty. Hicks served most of his time in the Southwest, fighting Indians. Captain Adams was discharged from the service on the October 12, 1848.

When word spread East that gold had been discovered in California, John went across country, arriving in Hangtown in August 1849. John stayed in the gold country mining, until September 1851, when he returned home. A year later in the spring of 1852, he again started for California, but this time he was accompanied by his family. They settled in Georgetown, where John continued mining, when in 1853 they moved to a farm near Gilroy.

== Career as county sheriff ==
John started his political career by running for and winning the office of Santa Clara County Supervisor for Gilroy and Almaden Township in the September election of 1861. In 1863, John ran for sheriff, beating William Aram by more than 500 votes. With the passing of Sheriff Kennedy on February 6, 1864, the board of supervisors appointed Adams (who would have been sworn in as sheriff in March) to finish out Kennedy's term.

Soon afterward, a band of Confederate partisan rangers, known as Captain Ingram's Partisan Rangers from the San Jose area robbed two stage coaches in the Bullion Bend Robbery near Placerville. During the pursuit Deputy Sheriff Staples of El Dorado County was gunned down when he surprised them at a rooming house the next day. Information filtered to Sheriff Adams that the Confederates were holed up in a shack near Almaden. Sheriff Adams and a posse of Deputies surrounded the shack, and demanded their surrender. The robbers failed to obey the order and tried to escape. A shoot-out ensued that resulted in all of the Confederates being either captured or killed in the volley of shots. Sheriff Adams was wounded when a bullet struck his pocket watch and glanced into his ribs.

Later that year and the next Adams pursued another gang of "partisan rangers", the Mason Henry Gang who had rapidly degenerated into a vicious gang of outlaws, committing robberies, thefts and murders in the southern San Joaquin Valley, Santa Cruz County, Monterey County and Santa Clara County preying on stagecoaches, ranchers and others especially if they were known Union men in the vicinity. Adams pursued the gang with the help of two companies of Native California Volunteer Cavalry from Camp Low during the summer of 1865. But no one could locate their hideout at Loma Prieta. In June 1865, a posse of nine soldiers and five citizens led by Sheriff Adams searched the area around the Panoche Valley in what is now southern San Benito County in search of the gang after receiving a reliable tip that they were planning a raid on the ranches there. However a system of spies set up by the secessionists had warned the band of their approach, when Sheriff Adams arrived at Panoche, Mason and Henry were already retreating towards Corralitos. Despite some encounters they were not caught but Adams pursuit made it so hot for them they soon left for Southern California. There Henry was killed by the sheriff in San Bernardino County in September 1865 and Mason by Benjamin Mayfield, a miner, near Fort Tejon in 1866.

While in office Adams acquired a good reputation as a lawman and ran successfully for re-election in 1865 and 1867. He became the first sheriff in Santa Clara County to be elected to three successive terms. Retiring for a couple of years in 1870, he again ran for re-election in 1871 and 1873, winning both terms. Although he didn't personally capture the highwayman Tiburcio Vasquez, he was a good detective and it was his information that led to Vasquez's arrest and capture in Los Angeles, Vasquez was hung before a large crowd of men, women and children in the yard of the Santa Clara County Jail. In 1875 Adams lost an election and finished his last term in March 1876.

== Death ==
On January 24, 1878, Adams left San Jose to mine gold in Arizona. In late August, he was appointed Deputy United States Marshal for the Arizona Territory. Ten days later, he and a fellow officer were ambushed by five Mexican bandits between the Washington Mine and Tucson. Adams put up a fight despite being shot and appeared to have been beaten to death with clubs and rocks. The murderers were caught in Mexico, but Mexican officials refused to extradite them to the United States for the prosecution of the murders.

Police appointments
Preceded by James Faris Kennedy	Sheriff of Santa Clara County, California; February 11, 1864–March 7, 1870	Succeeded by Nicholas R. Harris
Preceded by Nicholas R. Harris	Sheriff of Santa Clara County, California; March 4, 1872–March 6, 1876	Succeeded by Nicholas R. Harris
