= San Sevaine Flats =

Highest point
- Elevation: 5,545 ft (1,690 m)
- Coordinates: 34°12′43″N 117°30′36″W

Geography
- Location: San Bernardino County, California, U.S.
- Parent range: San Gabriel Mountains
- Topo map: USGS Cucamonga Peak

San Sevaine Flats is a small area of flatland east of Cucamonga Peak in the San Gabriel Mountains in San Bernardino County, California. The area is in the Cucamonga Wilderness in the San Bernardino National Forest, 1.24 miles south of Bonita Falls on South Fork Lytle Creek and north of Rancho Cucamonga, California. It has an elevation of 1,690 meters, or 5,545 feet.

== History ==
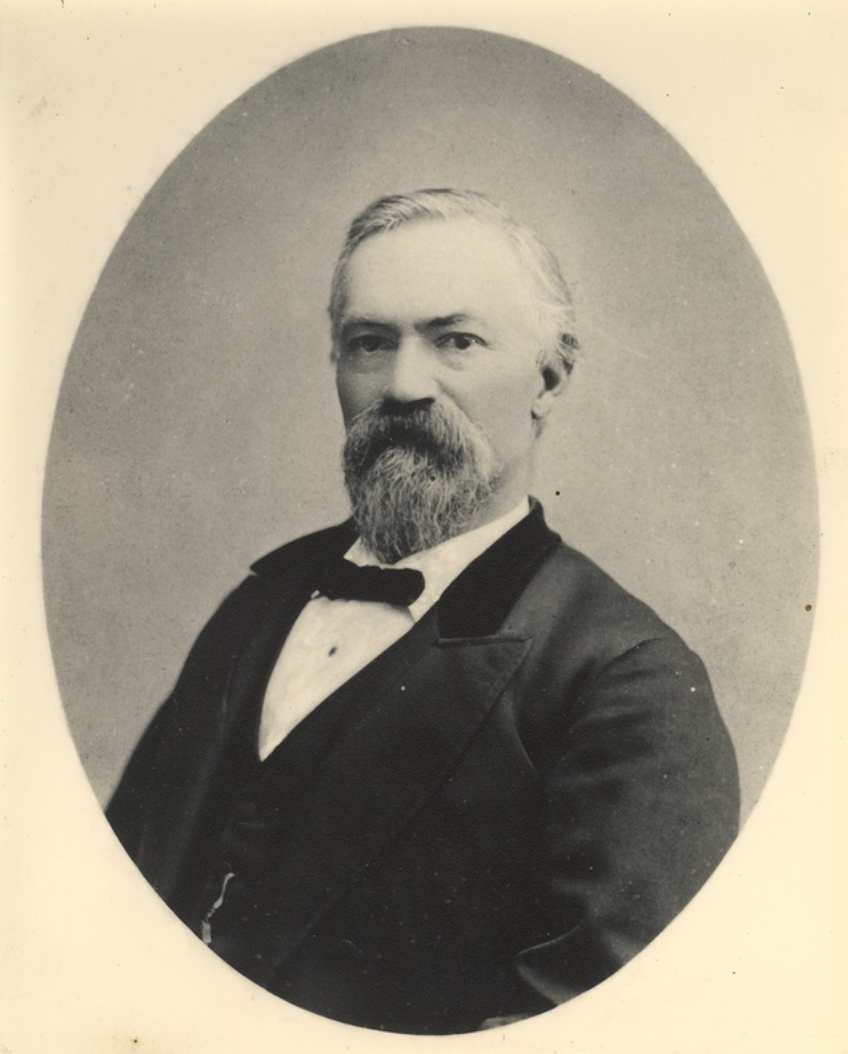
The San Sevaine Flats are named after Don Pedro Sainsevain.

Before the flat acquired its current name it was the hideout of the outlaw Tom McCauley better known as James or Jim Henry of the Mason Henry Gang. When the American Civil War ended in April with Lee's surrender at Appomattox the gang with a price on their heads, came under pressure from the Union Army and law enforcement officials in Central California. They moved into pro secessionist Southern California and split up. Henry with part of the gang moved into the eastern San Gabriel Mountains at San Sevaine Flats from which they began rustling, committing robbery and murder as they did. Henry was killed by a posse led by San Bernardino County Sheriff Benjamin Franklin Mathews on September 14, 1865, at San Jacinto Canyon, just over what was then the San Diego County line, in what is now Riverside County, California.

The flat was named (but misspelled) for Don Pedro Sainsevain, who with his brother bought part of Rancho Cucamonga in 1865 and set out a large vineyard. He moved to Cucamonga in 1870 and ran the vineyard and winery with Joseph S. Garcia. In 1874 the Sainsevain brothers purchased land in Hawker Canyon four miles east of Etiwanda and built a large stone house and a reservoir there.
