= Tanori's Raid =

- Part of Second French intervention in Mexico
Date	November 24, 1865
Location	San Rafael, Arizona 31°44′14″N 112°1′27″W
Result	Inconclusive

Belligerents
United States	Second Mexican Empire

Commanders and leaders
MajorJohn C. Cremony; 1st Lt. Edmund W. Coddington	Colonel Refugio Tánori

Units involved
1st California Cavalry Battalion (Co.C&D)	Opata volunteers

Strength
~150	350

Casualties and losses
none	none
- 1 American citizen wounded

Tanorori's Raid occurred when a force of about 350 Opata volunteers, under the command of Colonel Refugio Tánori, attacked the ranching community of San Rafael, Arizona. The raid was an attempt to capture Sonora Governor Ignacio Pesqueira.

== Background ==
After the Disaster of La Pasión, Republicans lost favor throughout Sonora with large riots in support of the Second Mexican Empire across the state. The uprising was started by indigenous then the violence reached major cities. The main Republican leader in Sonora, Ignacio Pesqueira took his men across the US-Mexico border and headed to Fort Mason in Arizona. Pesquiera went to talk to Colonel Lewis to ask for refuge.

"Colonel Lewis replied that he and his officers would do themselves the honor to wait on the Governor of Sonora, which accordingly they did, and offered the protection and hospitality of the post." - Sergeant Robarts, Company D, 1st California Cavalry Battalion.

Pesquiera camped with his entourage outside of the fort before moving to Calabasas. He then moved on to Tubac where he could gather financial resources and recruits for a new army. Days after Pesquiera arrived, 15 members of the Cavalry Battalion deserted with 30 horses, Colt Army Model 1860 pistols, and Sharps rifles. Others of the Battalion were sent to recover the deserters and stolen property. Soon they rode across the border into Magdalena de Kino, starting the Magdalena Affair. After the Affair many locals of Sonora felt insulted that the Americans had invaded their land and for Pico's belligerent behavior. In response to the Americans actions in Magdalena, a buildup of French and Imperialist troops begin near the border. Colonel Lewis established an outpost at an abandoned mine and sent a detachment of 24 men from Company D of the 1st California Cavalry Battalion, to patrol the border. Tanori's army was moving around the area.

== The Raid ==
On the 24th of November Tanori's and 350 Opata Volunteers crossed the border and attacked the community of San Rafael, opening firing on some of the ranchers and wounding one. When Major Cremony learned of the attack, he ordered the 1st California Cavalry Battalion to find the raiders. Companies C and D were sent across the Patagonia Mountains and reached San Rafael early the next morning. Finding the wounded American but no sign of Tanori's men, Cremony heard that Tanori's men left San Rafael after hearing of the Battalion's movements and were returning to Mexico. The two companies crossed the United States-Mexico border and entered the outskirts of the town of Santa Cruz, Sonora. Once there, they learned Tanori's command had retreated even farther south back into Sonora. The major ordered 1st Lt. Edmund W. Coddington of Company D and 10 Californios to move in advance of both companies and make contact with the Imperialists. They chased them but the Imperialist were always ahead. The prusuit went as far south as Imuris, where the Californios found that Tanori and his Volunteers had disappeared. After riding 40 miles the advance party returned to Santa Cruz.

== Aftermath ==
After resting in Santa Cruz, the companies headed back to Fort Mason, arriving on November 30. By the time of the raid many French regulars had largely pulled out of Sonora. Unknown to Tanori, Pesquiera and his allies had raised forces to fight Imperialist control in that state. Although the fighting in Mexico would continue, the Imperialists would never threaten Arizona Territory.
