= List of Old West gangs =

A number of Old West gangs left a lasting impression on American history. While rare, the incidents were retold and embellished by dime novel and magazine authors during the late 19th and the early 20th century. The most notable shootouts took place on the American frontier in Arizona, New Mexico, Kansas, Oklahoma, and Texas. Some like the Gunfight at the O.K. Corral were the outcome of long-simmering feuds and rivalries, but most were the result of a confrontation between outlaws and law enforcement.

Some of the more notable gangs:

- Alvord-Stiles Gang (1899–1903)
- Bummers Gang (1855–1860)
- GangChacon Gang (c. 1890–1902)
- Bass Gang (1877–1878)
- Tom Bell Gang (1856)
- Captain Ingram's Partisan Rangers (1864)
- The Cowboys (1877–1881)
- Dalton Gang (1890–1892)
- Daly Gang (1862–1864)
- Dodge City Gang (1879–1880)
- Doolin-Dalton Gang (1892–1895)
- Jack Taylor Gang (c 1884–1887)
- Jesse Evans Gang (1876–1880)
- Flores Daniel Gang (1856–1857)
- Five Joaquins (1850–1853)
- High Fives Gang (1895–1897)
- Hole in the Wall Gang (c. 1890–1910)
- The Hounds (1849)
- The Innocents (1863–1864)
- James-Younger Gang (1866–1882)
- John Kinney Gang (1875–1883)
- Lincoln County Regulators (1878)
- Mason Henry Gang (1864–1865)
- McCanles Gang (1861)
- Musgrove Gang (1867–1868)
- Newton Gang (c. 1919–1924)
- Reno Gang (1866–1868)
- Rufus Buck Gang (1895–1896)
- Selman's Scouts (1878)
- Seven Rivers Warriors (1875–1879)
- Smith Gang (1898–1902)
- Soap Gang (1880–1898)
- Sydney Ducks (1849–1851)
- Wild Bunch (1892–1895)

== See also ==
- List of cowboys and cowgirls
- List of Old West lawmen
- List of Old West gunfighters
- List of Old West gunfights
- List of criminal enterprises, gangs and syndicates
