= John Mason (outlaw) =

One of the leaders of the Mason Henry Gang

John Mason (18??–April 1866), with Jim Henry, was one of the leaders of the Mason Henry Gang organized by secessionist Judge George Gordon Belt. The group posed as Confederate partisan rangers, but acted as outlaws, committing robberies, thefts and murders in the San Joaquin Valley, Monterey County, Santa Clara County, Santa Cruz County and later in the counties of Southern California.

== Early life ==
Little is known about John Mason before he joined the Mason Henry Gang. He was Southern-born and a former stage hostler who had reportedly killed several men in altercations. In the spring of 1864 the gang rode from Belt's rancho over to Santa Clara County, a center of Copperhead sympathizers, to recruit more members. They returned without success to the San Joaquin Valley. By October, 1864, with the presidential election approaching and the Civil War in the East reaching a climax, Mason and Henry's gang quickly deteriorated into brigands but because they called themselves Confederate soldiers, they managed to have support among the Copperheads in the area. They threatened to kill every "black republican" they chanced to meet.

== The Copperhead Murderers ==
Mason seems to have led the Mason Henry Gang into outright criminality, three murders committed on November 10, 1864, soon after the second election of Abraham Lincoln. Following the voting, during a party held at the Elkhorn Station and settlement, George Robinson who ran the stage station, a strong Union supporter from Maine, had gotten drunk and had made certain remarks slurring all Southern women. Word of this insult reached the Mason Henry Gang, who were camped in the area. These crimes were described in the Stockton Daily Independent, for Monday, 14 November 1864:

On the evening after the election MASON and McHENRY went over to Dutch Charley's, against whom they had a spite, and killed him. From his place they went to Mr. HAWTHORNE's, knocked at the stable, where 3 hired men were sleeping, and after cowing these men, obtained their pistols, went to the house and murdered Mr. HAWTHORN [spelled 2 ways]. They then returned to the stable, telling the men what they had done, and that they intended to kill all the Republicans they could. They took HAWTHORN's watch, double-barreled shot-gun, and 2 horses from the stable. From HAWTHORN's they proceeded to the house of Mr. ROBINSON [Elkhorn Station]. After obtaining a drink of water they asked Mrs. ROBINSON where her husband was. She replied that he had not yet come home from the election, but that a wagon was coming up the road and she thought that was him. They set out for the wagon. MASON first came up. He accosted ROBINSON with - "I am told that you said there was not a decent woman in the South. Did you say so?" "No, I did not," replied ROBINSON. "You are a liar, and I am going to kill you," said MASON. ROBINSON then jumped for him. MASON snapped his gun, which missed fire, and then fired with the other barrel, breaking his victim's shoulder and arm. ROBINSON then ran, but was pursued by McHENRY, who shot him twice, 1st in the hand and then in the back of the head, killing him. The murderers then told the man who was in the wagon with ROBINSON that he might go on to the house and tell who killed R., and moreover, what they did it for. MASON also told him that he was the man who had killed 2 soldiers at Fort Tejon and 1 at Camp Babbitt, and that MASON was not his real name; that he was after Republicans and intended to kill all he could. The murderers were well armed, having each a double-barreled shot-gun and 2 6-shooters. They did not appear to be influenced by motives of plunder, but solely by malice against Republicans. They have both for several months been around Gilroy and on Wednesday last, were seen near South San Juan. It is to be hoped they will not long escape their just deserts. They are of the worst species of the guerrilla, as cruel as Apaches, and as fanatical as crusaders.

Word of the murders spread, the newspapers named Mason and Henry "The Copperhead Murderers" and Governor Low offered a $500 reward for their arrest.

Mason was described by The Visalia 'Delta' of November 30, 1864 as one of two secession guerillas and murderers: "who killed ROBINSON and 2 other men the day after the late Presidential election:

JOHN MASON - Thick set man; about 5 feet 7 inches in height; weight, 165 or 170 pounds; age 30 or 32 years; limps one leg, and has a rocking walk; scar on 1 cheek; hair light color and very long; has it cut short underneath, so that he can tuck it up and give it the appearance of being short; small whiskers on the chin, redish color; small blue eyes, and have rather a glassy appearance; high, broad cheek bones. This man (MASON) lived at Fort Tejon about the year of '59 or '60, and says that he killed 1 man at that place; and says that his name is John J. MONROE. MASON is light complexion; front teeth are black or decayed; wearing new boots; blue overalls; check shirt; hat made of Cayote skin with tail standing in front; 1 6-shooter and butcher knife."

== Criminal career ==
After the murders the Gang crossed over Pacheco Pass, and went into hiding at a camp in the mountains above Corralitos. While in hiding, the gang frequented Watsonville where the local secessionists continued to shelter them as they made periodic raids up and down the San Joaquin Valley. They held up a stage on the road from Watsonville to Visalia, killing three men and vowing to "slay every Republican they would meet." Under the pretense of being Confederate guerrillas, the gang terrorized Monterey County and the nearby counties for the next several months.

In April 1865, word arrived at San Juan that the Mason Henry Gang had attacked at Firebaugh's Ferry. Captain Jimeno, in command of Camp Low, sent Lieutenant John Lafferty and a detachment of five Californio lancers from Company B, 1st Battalion of Native Cavalry, California Volunteers, in pursuit of the bandits. Hoping to cut off the gang at Panoche Pass, the lancers rode south along the western flank of the Diablo Range and encountered Mason the next morning. As the bandit spurred his horse in a desperate attempt to escape, Lafferty fired, wounding Mason in the hip and felling his mount with a single bullet. Although the soldiers captured the outlaw's horse, somehow Mason managed to elude them. At six that evening, Lafferty and his troopers returned to Camp Low with only the horse in tow.

== Gang breaks up, Death of Mason ==
When the Civil War ended in April with Lee's surrender at Appomattox and no longer shielded by "the cause", the gang came under pressure in Central California. They moved into Southern California and split up.

John Mason continued his criminal career in Los Angeles County in the vicinity of Fort Tejon and in what is now Kern County with a $500 reward on his head. While Ben Mayfield was riding to Fort Tejon from his mine in Lytle Creek in April 1866, Mason joined him on the ride and later tried to recruit him into his gang. When Ben Mayfield refused, Mason threatened to kill him, and also threatened to take the horse of another man, W. H. Overton, and kill him. That night while the three were in the same house, none went to sleep but in the early morning Mason lay down on his bed under a blanket, but was awake. Overton stepped out to look after his horse, then Mason tried to shoot Mayfield from his bed. Mason's pistol tangled in his blanket, giving Mayfield the chance to shoot him first.

Mason's death was announced in the Stockton Daily Independent, Saturday, 21 April 1866:

MASON, the DESPARADO, KILLED -- Visalia, April 20 -- MASON, of the distinguished firm of MASON & HENRY, was killed a few days since in Tejon cannon [canyon], by some citizens. There appears to be but little doubt that this is the veritable MASON. It seems there were several of his clan together and they all got off except the chief.
