= Tom Bell (outlaw) =

American outlaw (1825–1856)

- Born: c. 1825; Rome, Tennessee
- Died: October 4, 1856 (aged 30–31); Firebaugh, California
- Cause of death: Lynching
- Other name: Outlaw Doc
- Occupations: Military surgeon, gambler, outlaw
- Known for: first stagecoach robbery in the United States

Tom Bell (c. 1825 – October 4, 1856) was a western outlaw and medical doctor known as the "Outlaw Doc". He was the first outlaw to organize a stagecoach robbery in the United States.

== Biography ==
Born Thomas J. Hodges in Rome, Tennessee, he saw action in the Mexican–American War as a surgeon. Following the war he traveled to California during the California Gold Rush, but was unsuccessful as a prospector, later drifting around California as a gambler and as a medical doctor at times for several years. The outlaw "Doc Hodges" was arrested for stealing eleven mules. When he was arrested in 1855, wanting to confuse the peace officers, he gave the name Tom Bell, a small time cattle rustler. In 1855 he was serving time in Angel Island Prison for robbery when he met Bill Gristy and successfully escaped several weeks later. He escaped with the help of his profession as a doctor by faking a severe illness that fooled the prison doctor, which allowed him to escape. With Gristy, Bell formed an outlaw gang of five men and began robbing stages for several months.On August 12, 1856, after their spy spotted the Camptonville-Maryville stage carrying $100,000 (~$2.72 million in 2024) worth of gold bullion, the gang unsuccessfully attempted to rob it. In an exchange of gunfire a woman passenger was killed and two male passengers were wounded before the gang was driven off by the stagecoach guards. The slain female passenger was a black woman by the name of Mrs. Tilghman, the wife of a popular barber from Maryville.

The robbery and death of the woman passenger angered citizens, and both a sheriff's posse and citizen vigilantes conducted a massive search for the gang. By late September Gristy was captured. Under threat of being turned over to the irate lynch mob outside the jail, he revealed the location of Bell. The Stockton Sheriff raced to arrest him. When he found Bell near Firebaugh's Ferry on October 4, 1856, an impromptu posse commanded by Judge George Gordon Belt, a Merced River rancher, had already hanged him.

Despite the lack of success Bell had in his attempted stagecoach robbery, his example was soon followed by other outlaws with more success.

Three episodes of the Western television series "Tales of Wells Fargo" featured "Doc Bell" as a character. Contrary to history, he was portrayed in the series as a criminal who eventually reformed and returned to the medical profession to pay his debt to society.

== Resources ==
- Lapp, Rudolph M. (1977). Blacks in Gold Rush California. Yale University Press. ISBN 0300065450.
- Secrest, William B. California Desperadoes, Quill Driver books, 2000
- Sinclair Drago, Road Agents and Train Robbers: Half a Century of Western Banditry, Dodd, New York, 1973
- Sifakis, Carl. Encyclopedia of American Crime, New York, Facts on File Inc., 1982
