= George Gordon Belt =

George Gordon Belt (September 25, 1825 – June 3, 1869) was a soldier, 49er, businessman, judge, and Confederate sympathizer who organized the Mason Henry Gang in California during the American Civil War.

== Early life and California ==
George Gordon Belt was born on September 25, 1825, in Beltsville, Maryland. George Belt had joined Colonel Jonathan D. Stevenson's First Regiment of New York Volunteers that were raised as part of the American occupation army in California, during the Mexican–American War. Colonel Stevenson raised ten companies or 770 men to go to California with the understanding that they would after their service muster out and stay in California. Belt held the rank of quartermaster-sergeant when he was discharged in 1847 and settled in California.

On April 7, 1848, George G. Belt married Bebiana Asorca and they had nine children by 1869.

== Belt's Ferry ==
Belt then settled in Stockton, California, in 1849, opening a tent store. In 1850 he was appointed as a licensed trader at the Merced Indian Reservation. Belt's Ferry and store on the Merced River were about seven miles up-river from Snelling's Ranch. This tent-store was used mostly for supplying the Indians in that part of the San Joaquin Valley under contract with the federal government.

He became the first alcalde or judge of Stockton, California. On one occasion he rode with the posse that caught and hanged the stagecoach robber Tom Bell near Firebaugh's Ferry on October 4, 1856.

== Civil War ==
A dedicated southern sympathizer, in early 1864 Belt used his ranch on the Merced to organize a group of partisan rangers including John Mason and "Jim Henry" and sent them out to recruit more men and pillage the property of Union men in the countryside. For the next two years the Mason Henry Gang, as they became known, posed as Confederate partisan rangers but acted as outlaws, committing robberies, thefts and murders in the southern San Joaquin Valley, Santa Cruz County, Monterey County, Santa Clara County, and in counties of Southern California.

== Death ==
On June 3, 1869, Judge Belt was shot and killed in Stockton by William Dennis over a dispute between them.
