= 1st California Cavalry Battalion =

1st Battalion, Native Cavalry, California Volunteers
- 35 star Cavalry guidon
- Active: 1863–1866
- Country: United States
- Allegiance: United States; Union
- Branch: Army
- Type: Cavalry (Lancers)
- Equipment: Colt Army Pistol; Lance; US Model 1840 Heavy Cavalry Saber; Springfield Model 1842; Sharps Carbine
- Engagements: American Civil War; Bald Hills War (Co.A); Skirmish at Diablo Range (Co.B); Skirmish at Grass Valley (Co.A); Service in Arizona Territory; Magdalena Affair (Co.A); Tanori's Raid (Co.C&D); Apache Wars; Battle of Sulphur Springs

Commanders
- Notable commanders: General Andrés Pico; Major Salvador Vallejo; Major John C. Cremony

The 1st Battalion of Native Cavalry, California Volunteers was a cavalry battalion in the Union Army during the American Civil War. Recruits were largely drawn from the Californio population (colloquially known as "Native Californians"), though its ranks included Yaqui and Mission Indians as well as immigrants from Mexico, Hispano America and Europe (particularly France). In addition to its ethnic makeup, the Battalion is also considered unusual for being one of the few lancer units in the United States Army.

The Battalion spent its entire term of service in California and Arizona Territory.

== Commanders ==
- General Andrés Pico received a commission as Major in February 1863, but never formally accepted command of the Battalion, having declined the commission on the ground of sickness and inability to ride on horseback.
- Major Salvador Vallejo commanded the Battalion from August 1864 to February 1865.
- Major John C. Cremony commanded the Battalion from March 24, 1865, until it was mustered out a year later.

== Company assignments ==
- Headquarters Battalion headquarters were located at Drum Barracks from December 31, 1864, to June 30, 1865. Relocated to Fort Yuma July 31, 1865, then at Fort Mason, Arizona Territory, August 31, 1865, to January 31, 1866. Returned to San Francisco in early 1866 to muster out in March 1866.
- Company A was largely recruited in San José and commanded by Captain José Ramón Pico. Initially posted to the Presidio of San Francisco, in December 1863, their lances were replaced with Sharps Carbines and they were sent north to support an ongoing Bald Hills War taking part in one skirmish, serving at various posts in the Humboldt Military District through February, 1865. They were briefly posted at Benicia Barracks. While there on April 25, a detachment of 25 troopers commanded by 2nd Lieutenant M. E. Jimenez took part in a skirmish at Grass Valley with a group of 10 secessionists, where two privates were severely wounded (Antonio Guilman and Juan Leon). The company then marched south to join the rest of the Battalion at Drum Barracks in June 1865. The company departed for Arizona Territory with the rest of the battalion in July 1865. The company was posted to Fort Mason. During early September members of companies A and B deserted with stolen federal property. Pico lead 30 troops to hunt for the deserters. The search party rode into Magdalena but failed to recover the deserters or the stolen property. They remained at Fort Mason until January 1866.
- Company B was recruited in San Francisco and the Central Coast and initially commanded by Captain Ernest H. Legross from September 1863 to March 1865 when he was replaced by Captain Porfirio Jimeno. They were posted to the Presidio of San Francisco until January, 1865, when they were sent to Camp Low in San Juan Bautista to re-occupy the old Presidio of Monterey and operated against the Mason Henry Gang, a group of bandits with pro-Confederate sympathies who were terrorizing the Central Valley. They rejoined the rest of the Battalion at Drum Barracks in June 1865. The company moved to Arizona Territory with the rest of the battalion in July 1865 and was posted to Fort Mason where it remained until January 1866.
- Company C was recruited almost entirely in Santa Barbara and was commanded by Captain Antonio Maria de la Guerra. They were posted to Drum Barracks in September 1864 and remained there until the battalion was transferred to Arizona in July 1865. Posted to Fort Mason, the company unsuccessfully scouted for Imperialist forces with Company D. They remained at the fort until January 1866. The company mustered out at Presidio of San Francisco April 1866.
- Company D was recruited in Los Angeles. It was commanded by Captain José Antonio Sanchez from March to May 1864, then by Captain Edward Bale until May 1865 when he was replaced by Captain Thomas A. Young who served until his death from fever in Arizona Territory in December 1865. They were assigned to Drum Barracks in March 1864 and were largely employed in construction duties, though later in that year they were also tasked with maintaining order in Los Angeles County and San Bernardino County in response to threats of violence by Confederate sympathizers during the 1864 elections. In the spring of 1865 they were briefly sent to Camp Cady and patrolled the Mojave Road. They left for Arizona Territory with the rest of the Battalion in July 1865. The company was posted to Fort Mason where in November they and Company C rode out to hunt the large force of Imperialists that had attacked the ranching community at San Rafael. A detachment of ten soldiers rode out ahead of the companies but they were unable to make contact. They stayed at Fort Mason until January 1866.

== Service in Arizona ==
After a grueling march across the Mojave and Sonoran deserts, the Battalion arrived at their new duty station, Fort Mason, near the settlement of Calabazas on the border in August, 1865. They were joined there by Companies D, E, and G of the 7th Regiment California Volunteer Infantry. From there, the Battalion was to act against the Apaches as well as patrol the International Line against incursions by the forces of the Mexican Empire and its French allies. The neighboring Mexican State of Sonora had recently fallen to Imperial forces (as part of the French Intervention), forcing Governor Ignacio Pesqueira to flee northward and take up temporary residence at Calabazas.

Service at Fort Mason was generally considered miserable. Because of its somewhat swampy location on the banks of the Santa Cruz River, the men suffered from an epidemic which at one point rendered over half of them too sick for duty and resulted in 8 deaths, including two of the Battalion's officers. The post suffered from supply problems as well. These conditions brought the construction of permanent buildings at the post to a halt, forcing the men to live in tents and temporary brush shelters during their service there and generally curtailing operations against the Apaches.

These difficulties did not preclude all active service. From time to time the Battalion was able to organize patrols and scouts. Shortly after their arrival at Fort Mason, Captain Pico led a detachment across the border to Magdalena, Sonora in an unsuccessful effort to recapture deserters being held by Imperialist forces there. In November, 1865, in response to a cross-border incursion at the settlement of San Rafael by Col. Refugio Tánori and some 350 Opata militia loyal to the Imperialists, a force of Native Cavalrymen pursued the raiders as far south as Ímuris, Sonora. The Battalion also participated in a campaign against the Apaches from December 1865 to January 1866 which took them as far east as the Chiricahua Mountains and as far south as Fronteras, Sonora.

The Battalion left Arizona in February, 1866 and was mustered out in California in March at Drum Barracks. Company C mustered out in April in San Francisco.

== Casualties ==
The Battalion suffered 8 enlisted men who were wounded by gunfire and 2 officers and 9 enlisted men who died of disease. Most of the deaths from disease came from their time at Fort Mason.

== See also ==
- List of California Civil War Union units
