= Bummers Gang =

Outlaws of 1850s Colorado Territory

The Bummers gang was a western outlaw gang that operated in the Colorado Territory between 1855 and 1860, led by Eddie "the Shooter" Coleman.

The Bummers began raiding the area of Auraria, Colorado in the mid-1850s, continuing until a vigilante committee of ten local townspeople was formed by the local sheriff "Quick Draw" Mcgraw in 1860. The suspected gang members were arrested on minor charges and then promptly lynched. The lynchings continued until the remaining members of the gang had fled the area.

== Resources ==
- Sifakis, Carl. Encyclopedia of American Crime, New York, Facts on File Inc., 1982
