= Camp Low =

U.S. Army site in California (1864–1865)

Coordinates: 36°50′42″N 121°32′07″W

Camp Low, or San Juan Bautista Post, was a military post first established at San Juan Bautista, San Benito County, California in December 1864 by California Volunteers, in response to the attacks of the Mason Henry Gang in the surrounding area, during the American Civil War. The post was named in honor of the Governor of California Frederick F. Low.

In December 1864 Major John C. Cremony, marched three companies of California Volunteers under his command into the town of San Juan Bautista. Two were infantry and one was cavalry. They at first bivouacked on the plaza. But soon they made the National Hotel on the plaza their barracks.

In February 1865, Company B of the Native Cavalry, California Volunteers arrived from San Francisco at Camp Low under Captain Porfirio Jimeno.

On April 12, 1865, Lieutenant John Lafferty and a detachment of Native Cavalry, encountered the outlaw John Mason far to the southwest of the camp at the head of the Great Panoche Valley. Mason made a desperate attempt to escape despite being wounded in the hip by Lafferty's pistol and losing his horse. Lafferty returned to Camp Low on the 13th, bringing the captured horse and Captain Jimeno sent another detachment immediately to keep up the hunt.

After the Mason Henry Gang was driven out of central California in May 1865, the post was abandoned in June 1865, following the departure of the Native Cavalry to Arizona Territory.
