= Lynching of Ballie Crutchfield =

1901 murder of a Black woman in Tennessee

Coordinates: 36°15′43″N 86°04′18″W

- Location: Rome, Tennessee, U.S.
- Date: March 15, 1901; 125 years ago
- Attack type: Lynching
- Victim: Ballie Crutchfield
- Perpetrator: White mob
- Motive: Revenge for an alleged theft committed by the victim's brother, racism against African Americans

On March 15, 1901, an African American woman named Ballie Crutchfield was lynched by a white mob in Rome, Tennessee. The mob had tried to murder her brother earlier that night, but was unsuccessful and took vengeance on his sister Ballie - she was bound, shot, and thrown into a creek.

== Background and events ==
The week before the murder, rumors spread that a white man in Rome had lost wallet containing $120, had been found by a Black child and given to a Black man, William Crutchfield. Accused of theft, Crutchfield was quickly arrested and thrown in jail. A white mob sprang him from jail but he escaped as they tried to lynch him. When they couldn't find him, the mob took vengeance on Crutchfield's sister. She was taken out of town, and with her hands tied behind her back, she was shot and thrown into a creek.

Her body was removed from the creek the next morning. Nobody was prosecuted for the murder; the New-York Tribune wrote on March 16, 1901, "The Coroner's jury found the usual verdict that the woman came to her death at the hands of parties unknown."

== Legacy ==
The Sacred Heart Review reported and commented on the lynching on March 23, 1901:

It is a very dull week indeed that does not now bring in the news that a negro has been lynched in some corner of our great, freedom-loving country, where all men are created free and equal, and where education and enlightenment is so far advanced that there is never the least difference made in dealing out justice to white man or negro. The excuse offered by those addicted to the lynching habit is that it is the only form of justice that is swift, sure and appropriate punishment for the crimes against white women which negroes are said to be most prone to commit. But sometimes lynching is visited upon negroes who are accused of other crimes. For instance, last week a negro woman named Ballie Crutchfield was shot to death near Rome, Term., by a mob, on suspicion that she was concerned in the theft of a pocketbook containing $120, lost by Walter Sampson a week ago. The pocketbook had been found by a brother of the woman. He was arrested, but escaped from the lynching mob, who became enraged and killed the woman instead.

Crutchfield's murder is one of the many lynchings remembered at the National Memorial for Peace and Justice in Montgomery, Alabama.

== See also ==
- Lynching of women in the United States
