= Jack Gordon (Peter Worthington) =

Jack Gordon (c. 1822–1864), original name, Peter Worthington, renegade, outlaw, in Texas, New Mexico and Arizona. Later moving to California he became a member of the Mason Henry Gang.

Peter Worthington a son of a well known Virginia family, who at the age of 17 killed a man and left home, changing his name. He went to Texas and New Mexico Territory, where he became known as a white renegade, "Apache Jack" Gordon, who lived with the Chiricahua Apache for several years. He was said to have shot and wounded Captain Enoch Steen during an encounter between Apaches under Mangas Coloradas and Steen's detachment of Company H, U.S. 1st Dragoons at the Santa Rita Copper Mines on August 16, 1849.

Gordon was also known as a gunfighter, who murdered, robbed, rustled cattle as well as doing some legitimate work. It was said he was a smart man that kept his dealings quiet but would shoot to kill upon the slightest provocation.

By the 1860s Gordon was in California, living near Tulare Lake and lived with and may have 'married' an Indian woman there. He found a lost female Indian child named Chescott and she lived with him in Tailholt, Tulare County, until his death. In 1864, he joined the Mason-Henry Gang. However he fell out with his business partner Samuel Groupie over a hog raising enterprise. In an ensuing gunfight, Samuel was wounded but survived and was later cleared of murder. Gordon was also wounded fatally and while dying arranged to have Chescott live with the Levi Mitchell family and gave his entire estate to her. Gordon then died several hours later on December 14, 1864. He was buried on the side of a hill in the Tailholt Boot Hill Cemetery, near White River, Tulare County, California. Chescot is buried near him.
