= List of Confederate units from California in the American Civil War =

The following is a list of California Civil War Confederate Units that were active between 1861 – 1866. Although California stayed in the Union, it was divided in its politics like many of the Border States. The southern part of the state had the majority of the southern sympathizers.

In 1861, Los Angeles and El Monte formed two secessionist militia units. Following the Federals success at securing California most of the Southerners who still wished to fight left for the east overland via Mexico, New Mexico Territory or by sea to reach the Confederacy. However late in the war two units of partisan rangers appeared within the state but had little success; one was dispersed and the other became an outlaw gang.

== Confederate Units ==
- Los Angeles Mounted Rifles
- Monte Mounted Rifles
- Captain Ingram's Partisan Rangers
- Mason Henry Gang

== See also ==
- List of California Civil War Union units
- List of American Civil War regiments by state
- California in the American Civil War
