= San Rafael, Arizona =

Ghost town in Pima County, Arizona

- Ghost town
- Location within the state of Arizona San Rafael (the United States)
- Coordinates: 31°44′14″N 112°1′27″W
- Country: United States
- State: Arizona
- County: Pima
- Elevation: 2,172 ft (662 m)
- Time zone: UTC-7 (Mountain (MST))
  - Summer (DST): UTC-7 (MST)
- Area code: 520
- FIPS code: 04-63660
- GNIS feature ID: 24598

San Rafael is a ghost town in Pima County, Arizona, United States.

== History ==
On November 24, 1865, San Rafael, then a ranching community, was the site of a raid, by a large Sonoran force of about 350 Opata volunteers under the command of Col. Refugio Tanori, an Opata leader commissioned in the Mexican Imperial Army, that left an American citizen wounded. It was believed to be an attempt to capture Sonora Governor Ignacio Pesquiera, who had fled the advance of French troops, taking refuge in Arizona Territory. The Volunteers left after news of 2 companies of 1st Battalion of Native Cavalry were headed their way.
