= Benjamin Franklin Mathews =

American sheriff (1819–1888)

Benjamin Franklin Mathews (1819–1888) was elected Sheriff of San Bernardino County, California, on September 14, 1863, and served from October 1863 to October 1865. Mathews was born April 16, 1819, in Chattanooga, Hamilton County, Tennessee. He arrived in Salt Lake in 1847 with Mormons, from Mississippi. He moved on to California in 1850, where he kept a hotel between Sacramento and Auburn. Mathews came south to arrive in the Mormon colony of San Bernardino, on March 30, 1852. Here he was at various times a teamster, miller, Justice of the Peace and finally sheriff. Unlike many Mormons in San Bernardino he did not return to Utah during the Utah War in 1857.

== Sheriff of San Bernardino County ==
Mathews won a close race on September 14, 1863, for sheriff of San Bernardino County which included much of what is (northern and western Riverside County today). Unlike most of his eleven predecessors he actually served out his full term of office from January 1864 to January 1866.

Mathews led the posse that hunted down Jim Henry of the Mason Henry Gang in San Jacinto Canyon on September 14, 1865. Mathews had led the posse out on election day but lost to his successor George T. Fulgham (1865-1869). Mathews was liked and considered to be very brave and honest.

Mathews was married twice: first to Temperance Weeks Mathews, and second to Mahala Ann Mathews. Between the two he had 13 children between 1840 and 1885. Mathews died in an accident on August 18, 1888, in Devil Canyon.

== See also ==
- San Bernardino County Sheriff's Department
