= Mason Henry Gang =

19th-century American bandits

Mason–Henry Gang
- Digital reconstruction of the flag carried by the gang
- Founded by: George Gordon Belt, Samuel Mason, John Mason, Tom McCauley
- Founding location: Stockton, California
- Years active: 1864–1865
- Territory: Central and Southern California, United States
- Ethnicity: European-American, Mexican
- Membership (est.): 12 - 16 men
- Criminal activities: Posed as Confederate Partisan Rangers committed acts of plundering and murder

The Mason–Henry Gang were bandits operating in Central and Southern California between 1864 and 1865. As the American Civil War was in progress, they were able to pose as Confederate Partisan Rangers, and their original mission was to rid the area of (anti-slavery) Republicans. However, when it became clear that the Confederate cause was lost, they turned to outlawry, plundering and killing without mercy.

The two leaders were John Mason, an alleged murderer, and Tom McCauley, a California Gold Rush criminal using the alias Jim Henry. The gang may have numbered up to sixteen at its peak. McCauley was shot dead in September 1865 by the San Bernardino County Sheriff Benjamin Franklin Mathews's posse, and Mason killed in April 1866 by a miner, Ben Mayfield, whom he had tried to kidnap.

== Mason and Henry as Partisan Rangers ==
In early 1864, a dedicated southern sympathizer from Maryland, secessionist Judge George Gordon Belt, a rancher and former alcalde in Stockton, used his ranch on the Merced River to organize a group of partisan rangers. They would be led by two southerners John Mason and "Jim Henry" and sent out to recruit more men and pillage the property of Union men in the countryside.

Unfortunately Judge Belt had chosen his men poorly. Both men had unsavory pasts. Mason was a southern-born former stage hostler who had reportedly killed several men. Jim Henry was a criminal whose real name was Tom McCauley. He and his brother had been robbers within the gold camps and together had murdered a man in Tuolumne County in 1856. He had been sent to prison for ten years and his brother was hanged. After his release from prison McCauley had returned to robbery with a gang along the Fresno River. When several of the gang were captured and lynched by vigilantes, Tom McCauley then fled and reinvented himself as Jim Henry.

In early 1864 the gang rode over to Santa Clara County, a center of Copperhead sympathizers, to recruit more members. Unfortunately it was a drought year that depressed the economy, and the increasingly bad war news also discouraged most of their recruits. They returned without success to the San Joaquin Valley.

By October 1864, with the presidential election approaching, Mason and Henry's gang turned into brigands. However, they referred to themselves as Confederate soldiers, and managed to garner support among the local Copperheads. They threatened to kill any "black republican" they came across.

== Mason and Henry become outlaws ==
On November 10, 1864, the Mason-Henry Gang committed their first crimes, three murders, soon after the second election of Abraham Lincoln. These crimes were described in the Stockton Daily Independent, for Monday, November 14, 1864:

On the evening after the election Mason and McHenry went over to Dutch Charley's, against whom they had a spite, and killed him. From his place they went to Mr. Hawthorne's, knocked at the stable, where 3 hired men were sleeping, and after cowing these men, obtained their pistols, went to the house and murdered Mr. Hawthorn [spelled 2 ways]. They then returned to the stable, telling the men what they had done, and that they intended to kill all the Republicans they could. They took Hawthorn's watch, double-barreled shot-gun, and 2 horses from the stable. From Hawthorn's they proceeded to the house of Mr. Robinson. After obtaining a drink of water they asked Mrs. Robinson where her husband was. She replied that he had not yet come home from the election, but that a wagon was coming up the road and she thought that was him. They set out for the wagon. Mason came up first. He accosted Robinson with - "I am told that you said there was not a decent woman in the South. Did you say so?" "No, I did not," replied Robinson. "You are a liar, and I am going to kill you," said Mason. Robinson then jumped for him. Mason snapped his gun, which missed fire, and then fired with the other barrel, breaking his victim's shoulder and arm. Robinson then ran, but was pursued by McHenry, who shot him twice, 1st in the hand and then in the back of the head, killing him. The murderers then told the man who was in the wagon with Robinson that he might go on to the house and tell who killed R., and moreover, what they did it for. Mason also told him that he was the man who had killed two soldiers at Fort Tejon and 1 at Camp Babbitt, and that MASON was not his real name; that he was after Republicans and intended to kill all he could. The murderers were well armed, having each a double-barreled shot-gun and 2 6-shooters. They did not appear to be influenced by motives of plunder, but solely by malice against Republicans. They have both for several months been around Gilroy and on Wednesday last, were seen near South San Juan. It is to be hoped they will not long escape their just deserts. They are of the worst species of the guerrilla, as cruel as Apaches, and as fanatical as crusaders.

The same article announced the reward for their arrest and conviction;

Reward for Mason and McHenry - Governor Low has offered a reward for the arrest and conviction of the 2 secesh murderers, Mason and McHenry, who on the night of election and next day, killed 3 men in cold blood. The circumstances connected with these murders are such as call for the speedy extermination of these 2 wretches.

Afterward the gang crossed Pacheco Pass and went to Santa Cruz County. They hid near Corralitos and frequented Watsonville, where the local secessionists sheltered them.

Soon after the murders, they held up a stage on the road from Watsonville to Visalia, killing three men and vowing to "slay every Republican they would meet." Under the pretense of being Confederate guerrillas, the gang terrorized Monterey County and the nearby counties for the next several months.

In late January 1865, Company B, 1st Battalion of Native Cavalry, California Volunteers, a unit of Californio lancers arrived from San Francisco at Camp Low in San Juan Bautista. Camp commander Major Michael O'Brien, 6th California Infantry, shortly afterward, received intelligence about the location of the Mason-Henry Gang hideout. A detachment of Native cavalrymen under 1st Lieutenant John Lafferty searched for them, but he was unsuccessful.

On February 18, 1865, Captain Herman Noble sent a detachment of Company E, 2nd California Cavalry, under Sergeant Rowley, from Camp Babbitt near Visalia in a long pursuit of men believed to be the Mason-Henry Gang. It took them across the deserts of Southern California, south to Sonora, Mexico. The March 15, 1865, issue of The Visalia Delta described the pursuit:

Mason and Henry - The squad of soldiers sent out from Camp Babbitt by Captain Noble under the command of Sergeant Rowley, in pursuit of the above Constitutional Democratic murders of Union men, have returned to camp. They report a very hard skirmish, traveling over 900 miles through a most desolate country; upon several occasions going out two or three days without food for themselves, or forage for their horses. They were several times on their trail, after they left Fort Tejón, and finally tracked them down into Sonora, when they were compelled to give up the chase on account of their horses giving out and their inability to get fresh ones. The fugitives were well supplied with gold, having $3,000 or more in their possession. It is believed by many that they have gone to recruit a guerrilla band, and will return to prey on Union men in the lower part of the State. They could have obtained plenty of recruits nigher home. Doubtless, Visalia would have furnished several birds of prey and a surgeon or two, to bind up their broken bones, and very likely a Chaplain to minister to their bruised souls, and a number of spies, sneaks, and informers. As to good fighting men, they would be scarcer hereabouts. The party were out twenty-five days.

It was reported in the Weekly Butte Record that in late-March of 1865, 2 members of the gang were shot and killed by soldiers in Los Angeles county.

In April 1865, the Mason-Henry Gang attacked Firebaugh's Ferry. When word of the attack arrived at San Juan Bautista, Captain Jimeno, of the Native Cavalry, in command of Camp Low, again sent out Lieutenant Lafferty with a detachment of five men to intercept the gang hoping to head them off at Panoche Pass on the western side of the Diablo Range. The next morning, they encountered Mason. As Mason spurred his horse to escape, Lafferty fired a single bullet that wounded both Mason in the hip and his horse. Although the soldiers captured the outlaw's horse, somehow Mason managed to elude them. At 6:00pm, Lafferty and his troopers returned to Camp Low with the horse.

== Breakup of the gang, death of Henry ==
Although the Civil War was over, the gang was still under pressure in Central California, so they moved into Southern California and split up. In July 1865 Mason and another gang member, Hawkins, pulled guns on Kern River rancher Philo Jewett, who had fed them dinner. The rancher ran, but his cook, John Johnson, was stabbed and shot to death. Hawkins was later captured and hanged on the testimony of Jewett, but Mason was still at large.

Henry with his gang first moved to the area of upper Lytle Creek and San Sevaine Flats in the eastern San Gabriel Mountains, rustling and committing robbery and murder. In September of that year, he and his associates were camped out south of San Bernardino and sent John Rogers to town to obtain provisions. While there, Rogers started drinking. Once drunk, he started boasting about his outlaw connections. Locals of Union sympathies took note, and Rogers soon found himself in the company of San Bernardino County Sheriff Benjamin Franklin Mathews and his posse, leading them to the outlaw camp. After traveling about twenty-five miles, they located Henry camped at San Jacinto Canyon. At sunrise on September 14, the posse approached cautiously when Henry was awakened. He roused himself to fire three shots, striking one posse member in the foot. Henry died in a hail of gunfire, sustaining 57 wounds. His corpse was taken back to town, photographed and displayed in the fashion later typical of the Wild West. Rogers was sent to prison for five years.

== Death of Mason ==
John Mason continued his criminal career in Los Angeles County in the vicinity of Fort Tejon and in what is now Kern County with a $500 reward on his head. While Ben Mayfield was riding to Fort Tejon from his mine in Lytle Creek in April 1866, Mason joined him on the ride and later tried to recruit him into his gang. When Mayfield refused, Mason threatened to kill him, and also threatened to take the horse of another man, W. H. Overton, and kill him. That night while the three were in the same house, none went to sleep, but in the early morning Mason lay down on his bed under a blanket, but was awake. Overton stepped out to look after his horse, then Mason tried to shoot Mayfield from his bed. Mason's pistol tangled in his blanket, giving Mayfield the chance to shoot him first.

Mason's death was announced in the Stockton Daily Independent, Saturday, April 21, 1866:

Mason, the Desparado, Killed — Visalia, April 20 — Mason, of the distinguished firm of Mason & Henry, was killed a few days since in Tejon cannon [sic] [canyon], by some citizens. There appears to be but little doubt that this is the veritable Mason. It seems there were several of his clan together and they all got off except the chief.

== Trials of Benjamin Mayfield ==
Mayfield for his pains was not rewarded, but was instead accused of murder by friends of Mason and tried for murder in Los Angeles County.

The Sacramento Daily Union, June 23, 1866, quoted The Wilmington Journal on the verdict:

On the evening of June 8, the jury in the case of Benjamin Ben Mayfield, who murdered the highwayman John Mason, returned a verdict of guilty of murder in the first degree. The next day he was sentenced to be hung on August 1. The counsel of the murderer Intend to carry the case to a higher Court if possible.

Mayfield's appeal resulted in a second trial on September 15, 1866. Judge de la Guerra refused the defense counsel’s request for a new trial after the jury once again found the defendant guilty of first-degree murder. The prisoner was sentenced to be hanged in August 1867. On application to the Supreme Court a stay of proceedings was granted. Eventually Ben Mayfield was exonerated.

== Membership ==
Estimates of the number of gang members ranged from sixteen to as few as four or five. Members came and went. Some disappeared with the continual bad news for the cause in the war. Others probably left when they became disillusioned with the criminal behavior of Mason and Henry that had nothing to do with the war.

=== Members and others accused of being members ===
- Jim Henry, whose real name was Tom McCauley formerly convicted and imprisoned for murder.
- John Mason, a Southern-born former stage hostler who had reportedly killed several men in altercations.
- Tom Hawkins, hanged in Visalia in 1866 for the murder of the Jewet Ranch cook, John Johnson.
- John Rogers, caught bragging in a saloon in San Bernardino, guided the posse that shot Jim Henry to his camp in September 1865. He was found guilty of grand larceny and given a five-year sentence at San Quentin in October 1866.
- Joe Dye, short-time member, a pal of John Rogers.
- Ben "Old Man" Kelsey and several of his sons.
  - Bill Kelsy
- A man named Pierce, alias Hall.
- Two Mexicans, names unknown.
- A man named "Overton", accused of being a later member. W. B. Overton was tried with Ben Mayfield for the murder of John Mason near Fort Tejon.
- Jack Gordon, (formerly Peter Worthington), of Tailholt.
- Charles G. Rudd
- John Tungate

== See also ==
- California Civil War Confederate Units
