= Canyon Lake (California) =

- Railroad Canyon Reservoir
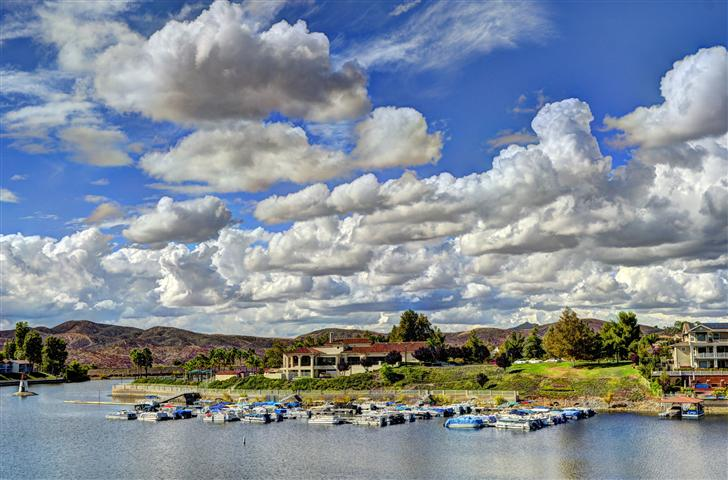
- Canyon Lake Lodge, light house and marina

- Location within California
- Location: Temescal Mountains, Riverside County, California
- Coordinates: 33.6876°N 117.2692°W
- Type: Reservoir
- Primary inflows: San Jacinto River
- Primary outflows: San Jacinto River; Terminal (evaporation)
- Catchment area: 664 sq mi (1,720 km^{2})
- Basin countries: United States
- Managing agency: Elsinore Valley Municipal Water District
- Surface area: 525 acres (212 ha)
- Water volume: 11,586 acre⋅ft (14,291,000 m^{3})
- Shore length^{1}: 14.9 miles (24.0 km)
- Surface elevation: 1,365 feet (416 m)
- Settlements: Canyon Lake, California
- Website: www.canyonlakepoa.com/lake
- References: U.S. Geological Survey Geographic Names Information System: Canyon Lake
- ^{1} Shore length is not a well-defined measure.

Canyon Lake, sometimes referenced as Railroad Canyon Reservoir, is a reservoir created in 1928 by the construction of the Railroad Canyon Dam in Railroad Canyon or (San Jacinto Canyon) in the Temescal Mountains of southwestern Riverside County, California. The reservoir covers approximately 525 acres (212 ha), has 14.9 miles (24.0 km) of shoreline, and has a storage capacity of 11,586 acre⋅ft (14,291,000 m^{3}). It is owned and operated by the Elsinore Valley Municipal Water District.

The reservoir is supplied by storm water runoff from the San Jacinto River and Salt Creek. Water from the reservoir feeds the Canyon Lake Water Treatment Plant, which provides approximately 10% of the domestic water supply in the Lake Elsinore and city of Canyon Lake area.

Canyon Lake has an average depth of 20 feet (6.1 m). Catch and release fishing is strictly enforced.

== Community ==
The city of Canyon Lake is a gated community near the reservoir. Residents can use golf carts and boats as a means for transportation within the community. Canyon Lake holds many annual events for residents to enjoy, such as Taco Tuesday during the summer time and festivities during various holidays.

== See also ==
- List of Riverside County, California, placename etymologies#Canyon Lake
- List of Riverside County, California, placename etymologies#Railroad Canyon
- List of dams and reservoirs in California
