= Rome, Tennessee =

Rome
- Unincorporated community
- Location within Tennessee Location within the United States
- Coordinates: 36°15′43″N 86°04′18″W
- Country: United States
- State: Tennessee
- County: Smith
- Elevation: 482 ft (147 m)
- Time zone: UTC-6 (Central (CST))
  - Summer (DST): UTC-5 (CDT)
- Area code: 615
- GNIS feature ID: 1300039

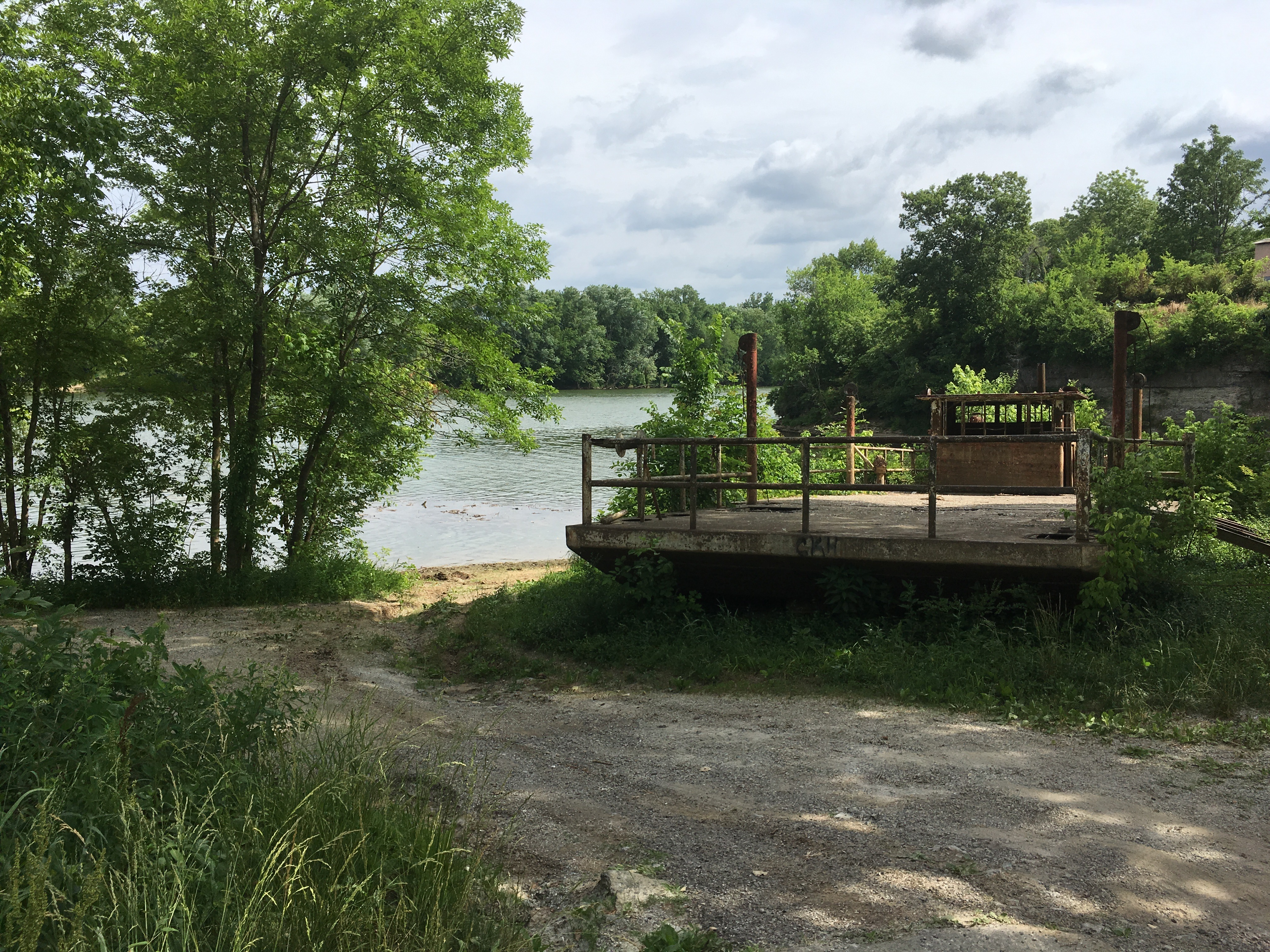
An abandoned ferry on the banks of the Cumberland River in Rome, Tennessee.

Rome is an unincorporated community in Smith County, Tennessee, United States.

Rome is located at the confluence of Round Lick Creek and the Cumberland River. It is served by U.S. Highway 70N (US 70N).

== See also ==
- Lynching of Ballie Crutchfield
