= San Bernardino County Sheriff's Department =

Law enforcement agency in California, United States

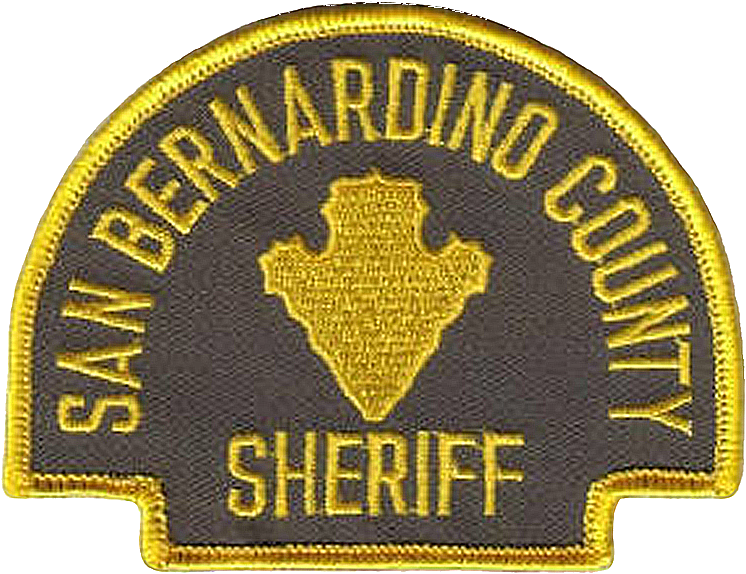
- Patch of the San Bernardino County Sheriff-Coroner's Department

- Flag of San Bernardino County, California
- Common name: San Bernardino County Sheriff's Department
- Abbreviation: SBCSD
- Motto: Dedicated to Your Safety

Agency overview
- Formed: 1853; 173 years ago
- Employees: 3,700
- Annual budget: $693 million

Jurisdictional structure
- Operations jurisdiction: San Bernardino County, California, United States
- Map of San Bernardino County Sheriff's Department's jurisdiction.
- Area: 20,186 sq mi (52,280 km^{2}).
- Legal jurisdiction: San Bernardino County, California
- General nature: Local civilian police

Operational structure
- Headquarters: San Bernardino, California
- Deputies: 2,000
- Civilian employees: 1,200
- SBCSD Office of the Sheriffs responsible: Shannon Dicus, Sheriff; Steve Higgins, Interim UnderSheriff; Rick Bessinger, Assistant Sheriff; Sam Fisk, Assistant Sheriff

Facilities
- Stations: 16
- Boats: 8

Website
- sbcounty.gov/sheriff

The San Bernardino County Sheriff's Department (SBSD) serves San Bernardino County, California, which is geographically the largest county in the continental United States and is headquartered in San Bernardino. SBSD provides law enforcement services to the unincorporated areas of the county and contract law enforcement services to 14 of the county's cities, including Rancho Cucamonga and Chino Hills, serving a total of 1,029,466 of the county's 2 million residents. The department also operates the county jail system, provides marshal services for the county superior courts, and has other specialized divisions to serve the citizens of San Bernardino County.

The Sheriff-Coroner is an elected office. However, in 2012 when then-Sheriff Rod Hoops announced his retirement, the Board of Supervisors appointed Assistant Sheriff John McMahon to the position. The Board made the appointment after determining that a special election for sheriff would be cost prohibitive ($3.5 million). McMahon was re-elected in 2014. The SBSD was featured on many episodes of the hit television series COPS, with the first 4 episodes being taped in the early 1990s.

== History ==
=== Early sheriffs of San Bernardino County ===
When San Bernardino County was established in 1853, its first sheriff was a Mormon, Robert Clift, who served until 1857. On January 12, 1856, a volunteer militia unit known as the San Bernardino Rangers was organized under the command of Captain Andrew Lytle to aid the Sheriff in suppressing raids by Indians and the gangs of outlaws like the Flores Daniel Gang that plagued the county. Sheriff James S. Raser was elected in September 1857 but left in the Mormon exodus for Utah soon after and Joseph Bridger was appointed by the Supervisors to the office until elections were held again in September 1858. The winner in that election was James W. Mitchell, however on February 8, 1859, the Supervisors ordered that:

"... the District Attorney Commence Suit against James W. Mitchell, Sheriff and his sureties for the amount of delinquent Taxes."

Subsequently, at a special meeting of the Supervisors on February 26, 1859, Valentine J. Herring was named to be sheriff of San Bernardino County until the next election in September 1859. V. J. Herring was still Sheriff during the Ainsworth Gentry Affair a couple of weeks after he lost the election to Charles Wesley Piercy. Piercy held the office from October 1859, until he resigned in October 1860 to run for the State Assembly and William Tarleton was appointed to take his place. In November 1860, Anson Van Leuvan who had come second to Piercey in the previous election was elected and served as the Sheriff from 1860 to 1862. He had difficulties enforcing the law in Belleville and the other boom towns of the Holcomb Valley gold rush and with the turbulence caused in the county by the secession crisis and the beginning of the American Civil War. Eli M. Smith elected in the fall of 1861, was known for his pursuit of a gang of horse thieves who had been operating in the county for several months stealing horses made precious by the wartime need for horseflesh. On one occasion Sheriff Smith rode into an outlaw camp, recovering a herd of stolen horses and arresting three thieves. By the end of his term in office he had convicted 18 men of horse theft and sent them to prison.

Sheriff Benjamin F. Mathews elected September 14, 1863, served from October, 1863 to October, 1865. In September 1865 the outlaw James Henry of the Mason Henry Gang and his gang of rustlers, robbers and murderers were in the county, camped out near San Bernardino. John Rogers, a gang member sent to town to obtain provisions in San Bernardino, was captured after drunken boasting in the saloons of "Whiskey Point" by Sheriff Mathews and persuaded to disclose the gangs hideout. Sheriff Mathews and his posse guided by Rogers, found and surprised Henry camped along the San Jacinto River in Railroad Canyon, (then called San Jacinto Canyon), about twenty-five miles south of town. At sunrise on September 14, 1865, the posse approached cautiously but Henry awoke and fired three shots, striking one posse member in the foot. Henry died in a hail of gunfire, sustaining 57 wounds. His corpse was taken back to town, photographed and his body was displayed to the public in Old West fashion.

Some of the other men holding the office of Sheriff in the early years were George T. Fulgham was Sheriff from (1865 to 1869), Newton Noble (1869–1873), J. C Curry (1873–1877), William Davies (1877–1879), John King (1879–1882), J. B. Burkhart (1882–1884), Nelson G. Gill (1884–1885), Edwin Chidsey Seymour (1888–1892), James P. Booth (1892–1894), Charles A. Rouse (1894–1895), John C. Ralphs (1902–1915), J. L. McMinn (1915–1918).

=== Later history ===
In 2018, a jury awarded $33.5 million in damages to the family of Nathanael Pickett. At that time, this was the largest settlement awarded in the case of a police shooting in US history.

== Firearms ==
- Glock Model 21 .45 ACP or Model 17 9mm standard sidearm
- SIG Sauer P226 is another option allowed for deputies to carry.
- Ruger Mini-14 used by deputies as well as some S.W.A.T members .223
- AR-15 rifles also used by S.W.A.T
- Springfield 1911 pistol .45 ACP utilized by S.W.A.T members and seen in holsters of some S.W.A.T members
- Remington 870 12 Gauge patrol shotgun

== Fallen officers ==
Since the establishment of the San Bernardino County Sheriff's Department, 20 officers and 1 K9 have died in the line of duty.

Officer	Date of death	Details
Deputy Sheriff William Francis Smithson	Sunday, October 20, 1907	Gunfire
Town Marshall James Monroe West Jr	Monday, July 6, 1925	Gunfire
Police Officer Harry Samuel Thompson	Monday, June 10, 1935	Gunfire
Deputy Sheriff William Jackson Litz	Saturday, May 23, 1959	Struck By Train
Detective Donald Archibald	Wednesday, December 23, 1959	Heart Attack
Reserve Deputy Billy R Heckle	Monday, February 15, 1960	Gunfire
Lieutenant Alfred Elder Stewart	Friday, March 9, 1973	Gunfire
Deputy Sheriff Frank Marion Pribble	Sunday, July 6, 1975	Gunfire
Deputy Sheriff Clifford E Sanchez	Saturday, April 6, 1985	Gunfire
Deputy Sheriff Donald J Demeulle	Thursday, July 31, 1986	Aircraft Accident
Deputy Sheriff Keith B Farley	Saturday, April 12, 1987	Automobile Accident
Deputy Sheriff Russell Dean Roberts	Saturday, September 16, 1995	Struck By Vehicle
Deputy Sheriff Ronald Wayne Ives	Wednesday, September 1, 2004	Motorcycle Accident
Deputy Sheriff Gregory Alan Gariepy	Wednesday, June 22, 2005	Automobile Accident
Deputy Sheriff Daniel Jess Lobo Jr	Tuesday, October 11, 2005	Motorcycle Accident
Detective Jeremiah Alan MacKay	Tuesday, February 12, 2013	Gunfire
K9 Jojo	Wednesday, January 6, 2016	Asphyxiation
Sergeant Dominic Vaca	Monday, May 31, 2021	Gunfire
Corporal Armando Cantu Jr.	Thursday, November 18, 2021	COVID-19
Deputy Sheriff Hector Cuevas, Jr.	Monday, March 17, 2025	Automobile Accident
Deputy Sheriff Andrew Nuñez	Monday, October 27, 2025	Gunfire

== Rank structure ==
The SBCSD rank structure is as follows:

Title	Insignia
Sheriff	
Undersheriff	
Assistant Sheriff	
Deputy Chief	
Captain	
Lieutenant	
Sergeant	
Corporal/Detective	
Deputy	

== Organization ==
The current San Bernardino County Sheriff-Coroner is Shannon Dicus. replaced John McMahon on July 16, 2021.

Serving below the Sheriff is the Undersheriff. As in most counties, the undersheriff is second-in-command of the entire Sheriff's Department.

Beneath the Undersheriff are two Assistant Sheriffs. One Assistant Sheriff is in charge of Operations and the other is in charge of Support (administration of community affairs).

SBSD is organized into Divisions. Each division is commanded by a Deputy Chief.

The divisions are:

=== Administrative Services Bureau ===
This bureau operates the following divisions:

- Employee Resources- The personnel in this division participate in recruiting, conduct background investigations on potential employees, are responsible for payroll and benefits, and oversee the issuance of Concealed Weapons Permits.
- Training- This includes the Basic Academy, the Emergency Vehicle Operations Center, the Advanced Officer Training Center, and Firearms Training Center.
  - SBSD operates its own intensive, structured format, on-site post certified basic academy in conjunction with San Bernardino Valley College. The program is 23 weeks in length.
  - The Emergency Vehicle Operations Center (EVOC) provides driving training to entry level and in-service officers.
  - The Advanced Officer Training Center provides advanced law enforcement courses in a variety of topics to both sworn and non-sworn personnel.
  - The Firearms Training Center provides firearms training to SBSD and numerous other agencies in Southern California. Additionally every trimester SBSD deputies as well as several other county agencies conduct firearms qualifications, perishable skills, and other important training through the center's Range/Use of Force Unit.

=== Coroner ===
In 2005, the Sheriff's Department merged with the Coroner's Department.

=== Detentions and Corrections Bureau ===
SBSD operates a total of nine jail facilities throughout the county. The average daily inmate population is 5,600. In 2006, 107,606 people were booked into these jails. The bureau operates the following Type-II jails that are used for long term housing:

- West Valley Detention Center - This is SBSD's main jail facility and opened in June 1991. It is located in Rancho Cucamonga. It is used primarily to house pre-sentenced county inmates, and is capable of housing 3,291 inmates daily.
- Central Detention Center - This facility has served as SBSD's main jail since its opening in 1971. It is located in downtown San Bernardino. It is primarily used to house pre-sentenced county inmates and federal inmates, and averages a daily population of 930. The US Marshal Service also uses the facility as the west coast hub for transporting and housing federal inmates.
- Glen Helen Rehabilitation Center - This facility primarily serves as housing for inmates sentenced to county jail. It also houses some pre-sentence inmates. It averages a population of 1020 inmates daily. It is located in Devore, at the north end of San Bernardino.
- High Desert Detention Center - This is SBSD's newest jail facility located in Adelanto, California, which opened in January 2006. It is used to house approximately 700 pre-sentence inmates per day. It is not to be confused with the Adelanto Detention Center, a private facility under contract to US Immigration and Customs Enforcement (ICE) to house immigration detainees. Both are located in Adelanto, California, the SBSD facility on Commerce Way and the ICE facility on Rancho Road.
- Transportation Detail - This detail operates 12 buses, 13 vans, and 2 cars to transport an average of 286,000 yearly, mostly to court appearances. In 2006, the detail accumulated 934,000 miles (1,503,000 km).

=== Patrol Operations Region I ===
This bureau provides law enforcement services to the densely populated southwest corner of the county, which includes parts of the San Bernardino Valley, Pomona Valley, Cucamonga Valley, and the communities in the San Bernardino Mountains. This area also operates a Type I Jail booking facility.

- Big Bear Station - Provides law enforcement services to the City of Big Bear Lake, California, as well as the unincorporated areas of Big Bear City, Sugarloaf, Baldwin Lake and throughout the Big Bear Valley.
  - Big Bear Jail - This is a Type I Jail used for booking and court holding for the Big Bear Superior Court. It is located at the Big Bear Station.
- Central Station - This station provides law enforcement services to the unincorporated areas around San Bernardino as well as contract law enforcement to the cities of Loma Linda, Grand Terrace, and the San Manuel Indian Reservation. The unincorporated areas include Muscoy, Devore, as well as parts of San Bernardino, Rialto, and Colton.
- Chino Hills Police Department - This station provides contract law enforcement exclusively to the City of Chino Hills.
- Fontana Station - Provides law enforcement services to the unincorporated areas around the City of Fontana, including Bloomington, Lytle Creek, San Antonio Heights, the Auto Club Speedway, and unincorporated areas around the incorporated cities of Upland, Rancho Cucamonga and Ontario.
- Highland Police Department - This station provides contract law enforcement services exclusively to the City of Highland, California.
- Rancho Cucamonga Police Department – This station provides contract law enforcement exclusively to the City of Rancho Cucamonga, California.
- Twin Peaks Station – Serves the unincorporated areas in the central portion of the San Bernardino Mountains including the communities of Lake Arrowhead, Crestline, Running Springs, and Twin Peaks.
- Yucaipa Station – Provides law enforcement services to the City of Yucaipa as well as the unincorporated areas include Mentone, Oak Glen, Mountain Home Village, Angelus Oaks, Forest Falls, Barton Flats. It also operates a resident deputy sub-station in Barton Flats.

=== Patrol Operations Region II ===
This bureau provides law enforcement services to the large Mojave Desert portion of the county. The deputies at many of these stations operate in remote areas. This area also operates 3 of SBSD's Type I Jail booking facilities.

- Apple Valley Police Department - This station provides contract law enforcement exclusively to the Town of Apple Valley.
- Barstow Station - Provides law enforcement services the unincorporated areas around the City of Barstow. This area includes unincorporated Barstow, Lenwood, Grandview, Hinkley, Yermo, Daggett, Newberry Springs, Trona, Baker, Red Mountain, Kramer Junction, Helendale, Fort Irwin, and Ludlow. This station also has resident deputy sub-stations in Trona and Baker. The Barstow Station covers 9,219 square miles (23,880 km^{2}) and has the largest patrol area in the county.
  - Barstow Jail - This Type I Jail is used as a booking facility for the Barstow area and court holding for the Barstow Superior Court. It is located at the Barstow Station.
- Colorado River Station - Serves the unincorporated areas at the east end of the county near Needles and provides contract law enforcement to the city of Needles. The areas include Big River, Parker Dam, and Havasu Landing. This station has a resident deputy sub-station in Havasu Landing. It also operates a Marine Enforcement unit that patrols San Bernardino County's portion of the Colorado River.
  - Needles Jail - This Type I Jail is used as a booking facility for the Needles area and court holding for the Needles Superior Court. It is located at the Colorado River Station. It also patrols via contract

Fort Mojave Tribe in Needles, the Chemehuevi Tribe at Havasu Landing, and the Colorado River Indian Tribe in Big River.

- Hesperia Police Department- This station provides law enforcement services only for the City of Hesperia.
- Morongo Basin Station - Serves the unincorporated areas of the Morongo Basin and provides contract law enforcement services to the Cities of Twentynine Palms and Yucca Valley. The unincorporated areas includes the Morongo Valley, Landers, Johnson Valley, Joshua Tree, Wonder Valley, Pioneertown, Amboy, Cadiz, and Flamingo Heights.
  - Morongo Jail - This Type I Jail is used as a booking facility for the Morongo Basin and court holding for the Joshua Tree Superior Court. It is located at the Morongo Basin Station.
- Victor Valley Station - Provides law enforcement to the unincorporated areas of the Victor Valley and the City of Adelanto. This area includes Helendale, Oro Grande, Mountain View Acres, Piñon Hills, Wrightwood, Oak Hills, Phelan, Lucerne Valley, Spring Valley Lake, El Mirage, Cajon Junction, Summit Valley, and Silver Lakes. This station has sub-stations in Lucerne Valley and Phelan. The Victor Valley Station is also responsible for public transit enforcement within the victor valley, via the Victor Valley Transit Division.
- Victorville Police Department- This station provides contract law enforcement exclusively to the City of Victorville.

=== Specialized Operations Bureau ===
- Emergency Operations- Aviation and Volunteer Forces.

The Emergency Operations Division provides operational, logistical, and management support services to field operations during large-scale emergencies. These support services are provided by two units within Emergency Operations; Aviation and Volunteer Forces. The Aviation Unit provides patrol, rescue, and fire operations capabilities. Volunteer Forces provides search and rescue, evacuation, disaster planning, emergency management and Department Operations Center coordination. Volunteer Forces also coordinates all law mutual aid resources in Mutual Aid Region VI on behalf of the Sheriff.

  - Aviation also provides services including support, surveillance, medical transport, and search and rescue duties. It operates 6 Astar B-3 Eurocopters, 1 Mcdonnell Douglas MD500E, 2 Bell UH-1H Super Huey II's, 1 Bell 212, 1 Sikorsky H-3, 1 Aero Commander Grand Reconnaissance, and 1 Cessna 182. Deemed the third largest, non-military air force in the world.
  - Volunteer Forces supports the 2,000 volunteers within 112 units in SBSD. These units include Reserve Deputies, Explorer Scouts, and Search and Rescue members. These people, working for free, donate an average of 500,000 hours a year to the county.
- Crime Impact Team

The Specialized Enforcement Division Crime Impact Team has responsibility for gathering intelligence, conducting investigations into violent crime offenders, and SWAT responsibilities. The team members are cross-sworn as United States Marshall's and work closely with them in apprehending fugitives across the country. The Crime Impact Team investigates serious crimes occurring in the county as requested by the stations/divisions, and as assigned by the commander.

- Arson/Bomb Detail

The Arson/Bomb Detail investigates all suspicious fires within the sheriff's department jurisdiction including fire related deaths, insurance fraud, arson for retaliation, and arson to conceal other crimes or to destroy crime scenes. The Detail is also called upon by many fire agencies to assist with the investigation of arson related fires. The detail and its members are accredited by the FBI in handling explosive devices, military ordnance and unknown suspicious packages. The detail utilizes an explosives trained K-9 to detect many different explosive odors and powders. The detail maintains one of the largest police bomb ranges on the West Coast. It is used by local bomb squads, as well as others from throughout the southern California region, for training and the destruction of confiscated explosives, ammunition, and fireworks.

- Special Weapons and Tactics (S.W.A.T.)

In addition to other duties, a majority of the Specialized Enforcement deputies are trained as SWAT operators. They train a minimum of 36 hours a month to include: marksmanship skills; rappelling from buildings, cliffs and helicopters; helicopter insertion skills; and stealth and hostage rescue tactics. SWAT team members possess specialty skills in explosive entries and entries using night vision equipment. The National Tactical Officers Association, in the Summer 2000 issue of The Tactical Edge, recognized SBCSD's SWAT team as one of the premier teams in the country. All specialty skills derived from SWAT are beneficial to members during their daily duties, which frequently bring team members in contact with violent and/or armed suspects.

- SMASH / Regional Gang Unit

The San Bernardino County Sheriff's Department's Regional Gang Unit consists of two Gang Enforcement Teams. These teams operate as a countywide gang suppression effort. Each team consists of Sheriff's Deputies, Probation Officers and members of the California Highway Patrol. The teams' focus is on identifying existing and newly emerging street gangs and gang members, tracking criminal gang activities, and assisting in the prosecution of gang members. The teams are actively involved in assisting the Department's Homicide Division and allied agencies with gang related homicides and shootings. The county's revitalization of S.M.A.S.H. and aggressive gang suppression efforts by the San Bernardino County Sheriff's Department and local law enforcement agencies has resulted in an increased number of identified gangs and gang members.

=== Aviation ===
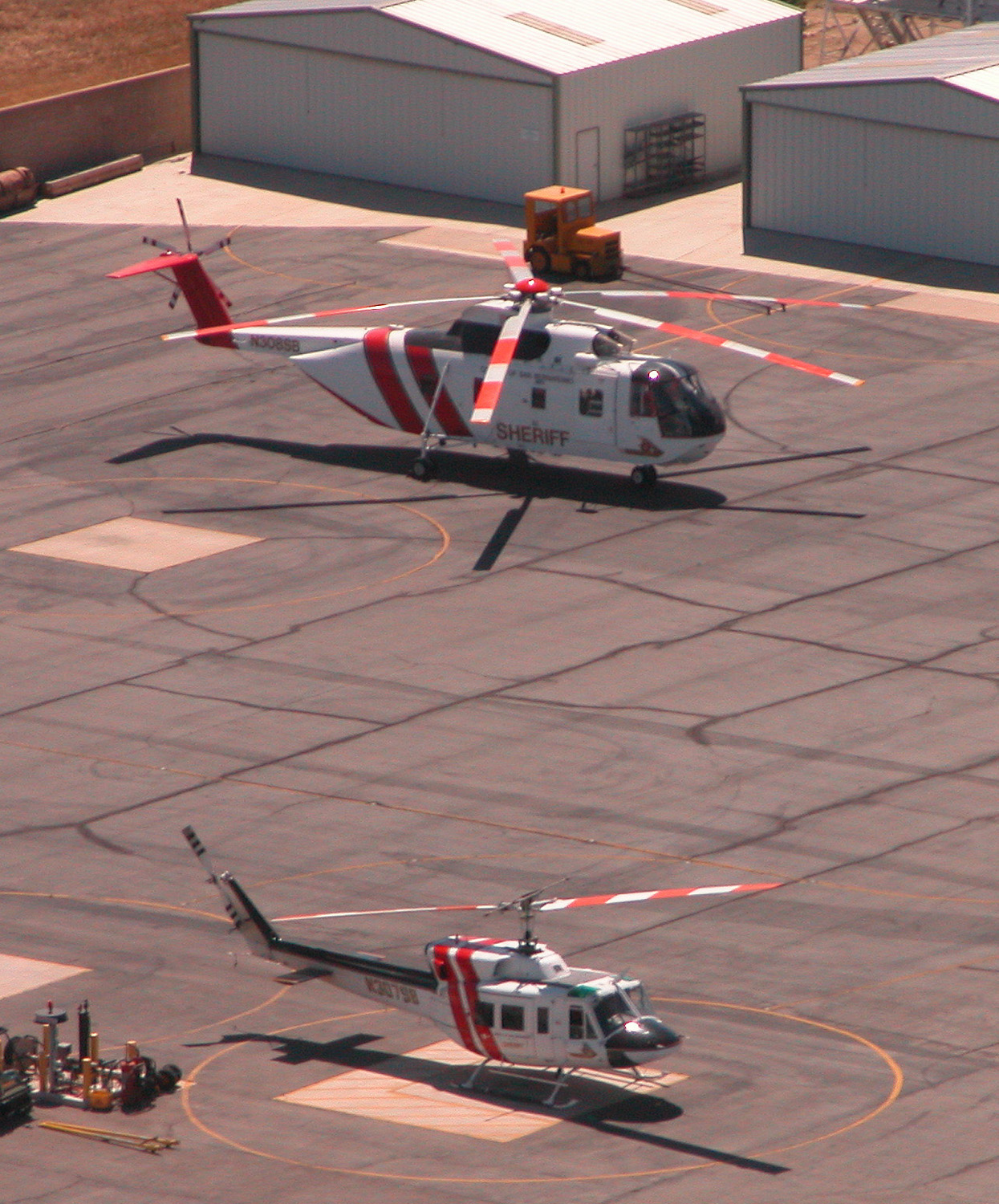
SBC Sheriff's department operates a sizable fleet of helicopters. Shown here are a Bell 212 (foreground) and a Sikorsky S-61 at the air unit's former location at Rialto headquarters. The Aviation Division was relocated to a temporary facility at the San Bernardino International Airport in January 2015 and moved into a newly built facility in July 2016.

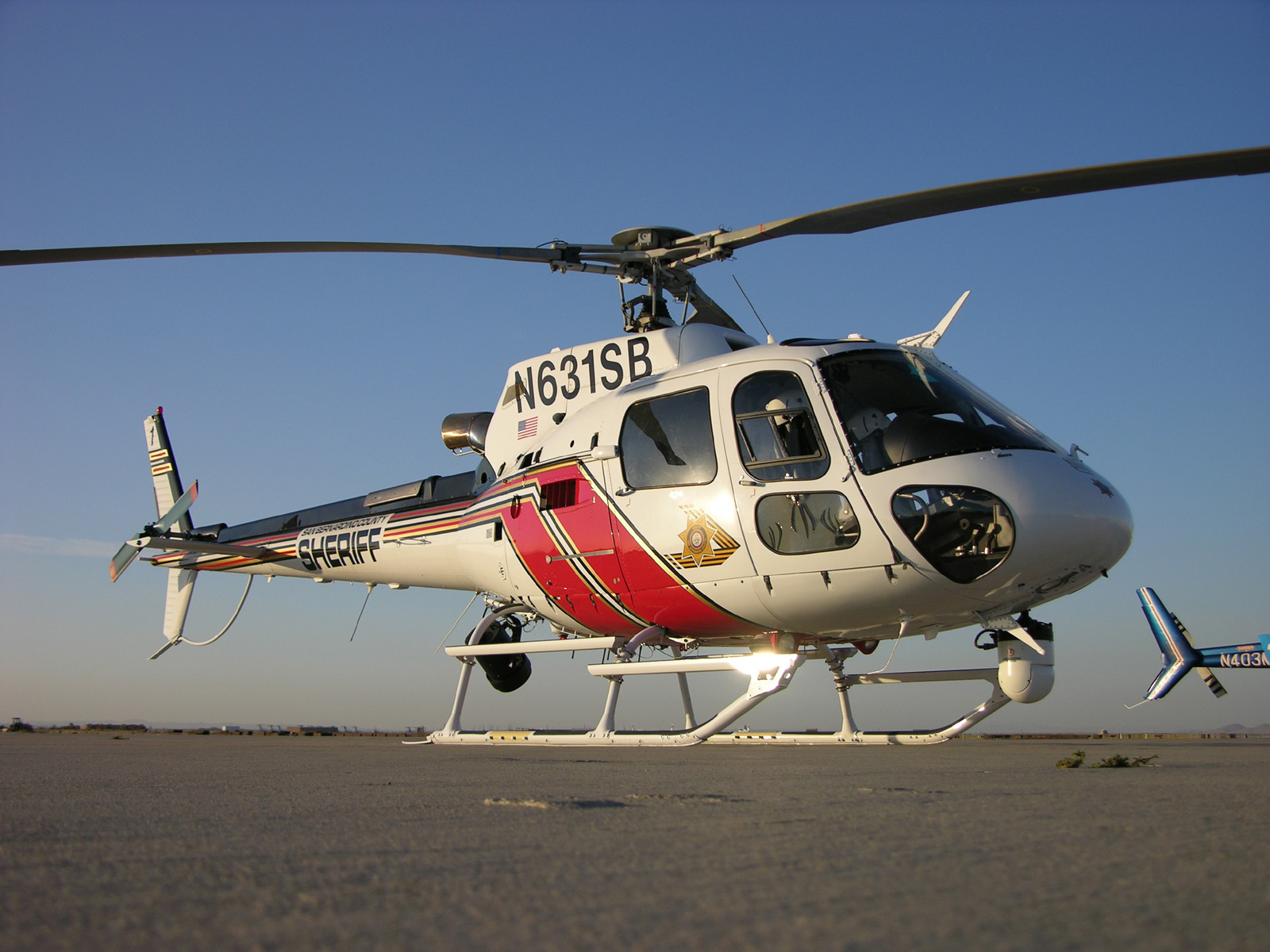
San Bernardino County Sheriff's Department AS350 B3

Aviation provides services including general law enforcement support, surveillance, fire suppression, medical transport, and search and rescue duties. It operates the following aircraft:

- 6 Eurocopter AS350 Astar,
- 1 McDonnell Douglas MD500E,
- 2 Bell UH-1H Super Huey II's,
- 1 Bell 212,
- 2 Beechcraft Super King Air,
- 1 Aero Commander Grand Reconnaissance, and
- 1 Cessna 207
- 1 Mahindra Aerospace Airvan 8

== Suicide and controversy ==
In December 2003, Ricardo Cerna, a 47-year-old criminal originally from Guatemala, committed suicide inside an interview room at the main police station. He was arrested for shooting a deputy. Even though the California Highway patrol assisted in his arrest, no one did a proper search on him. The suicide was also recorded on video.

== See also ==
- List of law enforcement agencies in California
