= Tom McCauley =

- Born: Unknown
- Died: September 14, 1865; San Jacinto Canyon, Riverside County, California
- Cause of death: Gunshot wounds
- Other name: James Henry or Jim Henry also McHenry
- Occupation: Outlaw
- Known for: Leader of Mason Henry Gang
- Criminal charges: robbery, theft, murder

Tom McCauley (1??? – 1865), better known by his alias James Henry or Jim Henry, was one of the many California Gold Rush criminals later a leader of the Mason Henry Gang.

== Criminal career ==
Tom McCauley, his origins unknown, was one of the criminals in Tuolumne County convicted of murder with his brother Ed McCauley in 1857. Ed was hanged on December 11, 1857, and Tom was imprisoned for ten years. He was pardoned in 1861, and as "James Henry" was known to have been in San Diego, Los Angeles, and San Bernardino Counties in 1861–1862. Later he joined an outlaw gang in the San Joaquin Valley until it was broken up by the law.

In 1864, now known as "Jim Henry", he was one of the leaders of the Mason Henry Gang organized by secessionist Judge George Gordon Belt, that posed as Confederate partisan rangers but acted as outlaws, committing robberies, thefts and murders in the San Joaquin Valley, Monterey County, Santa Clara County, Santa Cruz County and later in the counties of Southern California.

McCauley was described by Visalia Weekly Delta of Nov. 30th 1864 as one of two secession guerrillas and murderers "who killed Robinson and 2 other men the day after the late Presidential election:"

McCAULEY alias James HENRY - Light florid complection; full prominent forehead; dark gray eyes, large and prominent; dark hair, rather short; dark whiskers, rather thin; may have light moustache; hight, about 5 feet 7 or 8 inches; weight, 145 pounds; stooped shouldered; head thrown forward; brown coat; black hat, lopped down; had on boots; riding large flea bitten grey horse, shod all round, has collar marks; Spanish saddle, known as half ranger; no machios; small tipidarios; common bridle; Dragoon bit; had spurs; 1 6-shooter and common butcher knife; went by the name of Spotty, at Watsonville."

When the Civil War ended in April with Lee's surrender at Appomattox the gang came under pressure in Central California. They moved into Southern California and split up. Henry with part of the gang moved into the eastern San Gabriel Mountains at San Sevaine Flats from which they began rustling, committing robbery and murder as they did.

== Death ==
In September 1865, Henry and his associates were camped out near San Bernardino. John Rogers was sent to town to obtain provisions. While there, Rogers became liquored up and started boasting about his outlaw connections. The locals took note and Rogers was arrested by San Bernardino County Sheriff Benjamin Franklin Mathews. The sheriff's posse found Henry camped at San Jacinto Canyon, about twenty-five miles south of town. At sunrise on September 14, the posse approached cautiously when Henry was awakened. He roused himself to fire three shots, striking one posse member in the foot. Henry died in a hail of gunfire, sustaining 57 wounds. His corpse was taken back to town, photographed and displayed in Old West fashion.

At the time the location of Henry's death was just over the county line in San Diego County. Today the area is part of Riverside County. San Jacinto Canyon was flooded when the Railroad Canyon Dam was built in 1928. The location is now somewhere beneath the Canyon Lake reservoir.
