= Thomas Bell Poole =

American lawman and Confederate bushwhacker (1820–1865)

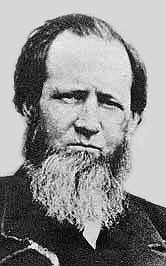
- Born: 1820; Franklin County, Kentucky, U.S.
- Died: September 29, 1865 (aged 44/45); Placerville, California, U.S.
- Occupations: Farmer, lawman, Confederate bushwhacker
- Status: Executed by hanging
- Motive: To avoid arrest
- Conviction: First degree murder
- Penalty: Death

Thomas Bell Poole (1820–1865) was a lawman in Monterey County, California, who joined the Knights of the Golden Circle and served as a crewman of the Confederate privateer J. M. Chapman during the American Civil War.

== Biography ==
Poole was born in 1820 at Franklin County, Kentucky. He married Mary Caroline (Duff) Davis. During the Gold Rush, he freed his slaves, went to California, and filed for a homestead in Monterey County. In 1856, Poole brought his family to Watsonville, California.

In 1858, Poole become an undersheriff for Monterey County Sheriff Henry DeGraw. He became known statewide for the hanging of convicted murderer Jose Anastasi on February 12, 1858, despite California Governor John B. Weller's order to postpone the execution. After Weller accused Poole of murder, Poole, supported by Monterey citizens, took part in a public spate with the governor, mounting his defense on technicalities, such as the fact that Weller's clemency had been mistakenly issued in the name of Anastasio Jesus. However, Poole's two-year term of employment was not renewed by DeGraw.

After his wife died in 1860, Poole took his family to San Francisco and engaged in the livery stables business. He joined with the Knights of the Golden Circle there. In 1863, he conspired with Asbury Harpending, Ridgley Greathouse, Alfred Rubery, and other California members of the Knights of the Golden Circle to outfit a 90-ton schooner, J. M. Chapman, as a Confederate privateer.

William Law, who was hired as the navigator, informed the authorities, and Poole along with the others was accused of treason and jailed in Alcatraz. He was released after Lincoln's amnesty of December 8, 1863, after swearing allegiance to the Union.

In 1864, Poole became one of the leaders of Captain Ingram's Partisan Rangers based in the Santa Cruz Mountains. He took part in the Bullion Bend Robbery. On the next day Ingram's bushwhackers were apprehended by three lawmen including El Dorado County Deputy Sheriff Joseph Staples. During the gunfight, Poole was shot in the face by Staples and went down. Other gunmen returned the fire that killed Staples.

On August 27, 1864, the jury found Poole guilty of first degree murder after 15 minutes of deliberation. He was sentenced to death by hanging. One of Poole's accomplices, Preston Hodges, was convicted of second degree murder and sentenced to 20 years in prison with hard labor. Several other people were charged, but were acquitted.

The California Supreme Court upheld Poole's death sentence. Requests for clemency were signed by the sheriffs of Monterey County, Santa Cruz County, and El Dorado County. However, all pleas for leniency were rejected by California Governor Frederick Low. Poole was hanged at Placerville, California on September 29, 1865.

== See also ==
- California in the American Civil War
