= Devil Canyon =

Valley in California

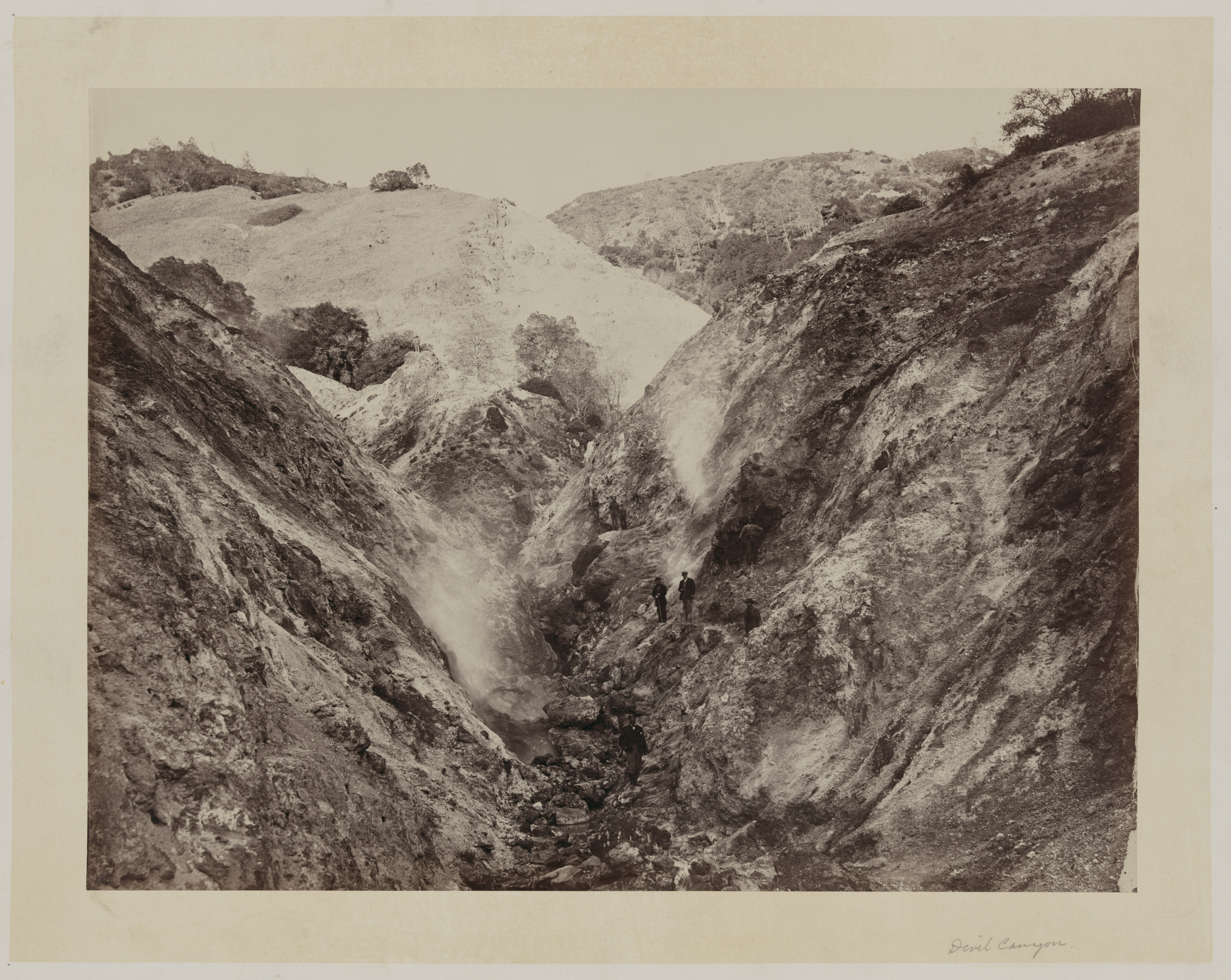
- Devil Canyon, 1868
- Floor elevation: 1,739 ft (530 m)
- Length: 7 mi (11 km)

Geography
- Country: United States
- State: California
- County: San Bernardino
- Coordinates: 34°11′45.57″N 117°20′15.67″W GNIS
- Interactive map of Devil Canyon

Devil Canyon, is a steep sided valley or canyon in the south side of Paivia Peak, in the San Bernardino Mountains of San Bernardino County, California. Devil Canyon Creek with its tributary East and West Forks, are a tributary of the Santa Ana River watershed, now interrupted by the local irrigation and flood control system reservoir at its mouth.
