= John C. Cremony =

American newspaperman (1815–1879)

John Carey Cremony
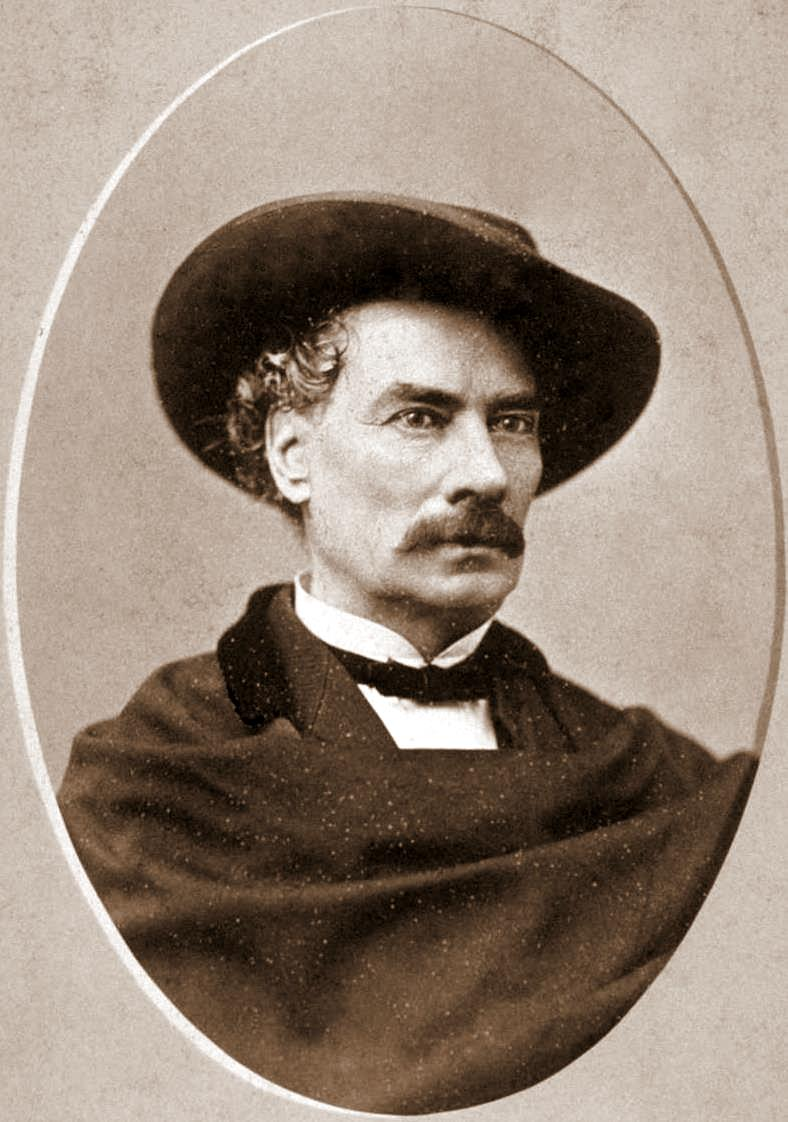
- Cremony in 1873
- Born: 1815; Boston, Massachusetts
- Died: August 24, 1879; San Francisco, California
- Military career
- Service years: 1861–1872
- Rank: Major
- Unit: 2nd California Cavalry Regiment
- Commands: 1st California Cavalry Battalion
- Conflicts: Mexican–American War; American Civil War; Apache Wars: Battle of Apache Pass
- Other work: author

Major John C. Cremony (1815 – August 24, 1879) was an American soldier who wrote the first dictionary of the Apache language and later became a newspaperman in San Francisco.

== Early life ==
Cremony was born in Boston in 1815 and claimed to have been of Cuban descent. He ran away to sea where he bore witness to piracy and the slave trade.

He enlisted in the Massachusetts Volunteers in 1846 at the onset of the Mexican–American War, and served as a Spanish-language interpreter and rose to the rank of lieutenant. After the war with Mexico, Cremony returned to Massachusetts and briefly worked as a newspaper reporter until 1850 when he returned to the west and served as a Spanish-language interpreter for the U.S. Boundary Commission which laid out the Mexican and United States Border between 1849 and 1852. When the Boundary Commission returned to the East, Cremony remained in San Diego, California and sought his fortune as a miner and prospector.

With the outbreak of the Civil War, Cremony joined the California Volunteers. In 1861 as a captain in Company B, 2nd Regiment California Volunteer Cavalry a unit of California Volunteers, he arrived in the New Mexico Territory as part of the California Column.

He eventually achieved the rank of major in 1864 and commanded the 1st Battalion of Native Cavalry, California Volunteers until 1866.

== In the southwest ==
Cremony served most of his military career in the Southwest and personally knew Apache Chiefs Mangas Coloradas and Cochise. He was the first white man to become fluent in the Apache language, learning it in his role as an interpreter, and publishing the first written compilation of their language as a glossary for the army. As a result, Cremony was often able to resolve numerous issues between the military, reservation authorities, and the Apache tribes. Not all of Cremony's discourses with the Apache were peaceful, however. He killed one warrior in a grueling knife fight and chronicled a non-stop 21-hour chase when he was pursued by a band of Sierra Blanca Apache (White Mountain Apache) for some 125 miles (201 km) through the desert of New Mexico while on horseback, 70 miles (110 km) of which were at a full gallop. Cremony authored Life Among the Apaches, published in 1868, in which he described his experiences with the tribe.

== Post military life ==
After retiring from the army, Cremony settled in San Francisco, becoming a founding member of the Bohemian Club and establishing the club's membership guidelines in 1872. He was the first editor of San Francisco's Weekly Sunday Times newspaper and editor of the Commercial Herald and Market Review.

Cremony died of tuberculosis on August 24, 1879 and is buried at Cypress Lawn Memorial Park on the Laurel Hill Mound in San Francisco, California.

== Legacy ==
Although he was one of the first Americans who could speak the Apache language, Cremony never lived among the Apache in the way the title of his book suggests. Historians of the West have come to deem many of Cremony's accounts of his Indian campaigns extravagant or embellished. The Arizona Evening Star compared his veracity to that of Baron Munchausen, and a soldier who served under him did not "believe anything he says except when he says he wants whiskey."

== Bibliography ==
- John C. Cremony, Life Among the Apaches, A. Roman & Company, San Francisco, (1868).
