= Benjamin Mayfield =

American cowboy and miner

- Born: Illinois, United States
- Citizenship: United States
- Occupations: Cowboy, miner
- Years active: 1849–1870s
- Known for: Killing outlaw John Mason; subject of murder trials
- Criminal charges: Murder (wrongfully convicted)
- Criminal status: Exonerated (1869)
- Parent: William Mayfield (father)

Benjamin Mayfield (c. 1831–187?) was a cowboy and a miner who killed the outlaw John Mason.

== Early life ==
Benjamin Mayfield, the second son of American pioneer farmer William Mayfield and his first wife, was born in Illinois in about 1831. His father moved the family to Texas in 1837, where he and his older brother John grew up in Washington County and his brother Thomas Jefferson Mayfield was born in 1843. There his other died sometime before his father was married to his second wife Mary Ann Curd on March 16, 1848.

When Benjamin was 18, in 1849 his father moved the family again to California, with a U. S. Army wagon train but were sent back to avoid the danger to civilians from the Lipan Apache on the trail and they then took a six-month trip by ship from Galveston around Cape Horn to reach California. After they landed at San Francisco, William took his family to the southern end of the San Joaquin Valley, then Mariposa County, now Tulare County to a place at the confluence of Sycamore Creek with the Kings River, (about 1.5 miles above modern Trimmer, California). There Ben and his older brother John helped his father build a cabin, put in crops and began mining.

Mary Mayfield died in December 1850, and in 1851, William Mayfield left eight-year-old Thomas to be raised by the Choinumni, the friendly Yokuts tribe living across the river from his cabin, while he and his two older sons left to engage in mining and raising cattle for the next 10 years. With his father and brother Benjamin ran cattle and horses through most of the San Joaquin Valley, captured wild horses on the west side of that valley and fought Monache on the east side, his father becoming well known throughout the valley.

William Mayfield died on April 9, 1862, leading Tulare County militia in the Battle of Mayfield Canyon early in the Owens Valley Indian War. After his death Benjamin went to Southern California and became a miner in the Lytle Creek mines.

== Killing of John Mason and the Trials of Benjamin Mayfield ==
In April 1866, the outlaw John Mason intercepted and joined Benjamin Mayfield on the ride to Fort Tejon from his mine in Lytle Creek. Benjamin knew of him and that there was a $500 reward on Mason's head. However Mason was also protected by the large number of pro secessionists in that part of the state, that made collecting the bounty dangerous. Mason later tried to recruit him into his gang. When Ben refused, Mason threatened to kill him. Mason had also threatened to take the horse of another man W. H. Overton and kill him. That night while the three were in the same house, none went to sleep but in the early morning Mason lay down on his bed under a blanket, but was awake. Overton stepped out to look after his horse, then Mason tried to shoot Mayfield from his bed. Mason's pistol tangled in his blanket, giving Mayfield the chance to shoot him first. Fearing reprisal from the gang or his secessionist friends, Mayfield and Overton carried Mason out on his bed and buried them in an unmarked grave, but his body was later found.

Mason's death was announced in the Stockton Daily Independent, Saturday, April 21, 1866:

Mason, the Desparado, Killed – Visalia, April 20 – Mason, of the distinguished firm of Mason & Henry, was killed a few days since in Tejon cannon[canyon], by some citizens. There appears to be but little doubt that this is the veritable Mason. It seems there were several of his clan together and they all got off except the chief.

Mayfield and Overton for their pains were not rewarded but were accused of murder by friends of Mason, and tried for murder in Los Angeles County.

The Sacramento Daily Union, June 23, 1866, quotes The Wilmington Journal on the verdict:

On the evening of June 8, the jury in the case of Benjamin Ben Mayfield, who murdered the highwayman John Mason, returned a verdict of guilty of murder in the first degree. The next day he was sentenced to be hung on August 1. The counsel of the murderer intend to carry the case to a higher Court if possible.

Mayfield's appeal resulted in a second trial on September 15, 1866. The jury again found the defendant guilty of murder in the first degree and the counsel for the defense asked for a new trial, which was refused by Judge de la Guerra. The prisoner was sentenced to be hanged in August 1867. On application to the Supreme Court a stay of proceedings was granted.

Exonerated in 1869, Benjamin died an embittered man sometime in the 1870s.
