= Refugio Tánori =

Mexican soldier and a member of the Opata People

Refugio Tánori (1835–1866) was a Mexican soldier and a member of the Opata People.

== Early life ==
He was born in the town of Álamos in 1835.

== Military career ==
During the Reform War he fought on the side of the conservatives with the rank of captain, joining his brother Juan Tanori. After the conservatives lost the war, Tánori was amnestied.

In 1865, he joined the forces of the Second Mexican Empire, and on October 5 of that year Emperor Maximilian granted him the rank of general and granted him a cross from the Order of Guadalupe.

He played a role in the siege of Ures, freed the Algerian prisoners held at San Pedro, Sinaloa, and defeated Jesús García Morales at Nacori Grande. He played an important rule during the defense of Hermosillo and at the Battle of Guadalupe.

As the Empire began to falter in 1866, especially in the northern provinces, he headed towards Guaymas and sought to escape to Baja California, but the ship on which he had embarked with other imperialist officials and officers was overtaken by another ship commanded by liberal colonel Próspero Salazar Bustamante, and Tánori was apprehended.

He was shot by firing squad, along with the rest of his companions, at the orders of the liberal general Ángel Martinez, on September 25, 1866. As he stood before the firing squad, his last words were

I'm about to die for an empire which stood for the social regeneration of my motherland, its independence, and its honor. I die then satisfied that I have fulfilled my duties as a Mexican. Long live the Emperor.

== See also ==
- Yaqui Wars
- Second French intervention in Mexico
- Tanori's Raid
