= Captain Ingram's Partisan Rangers =

Band of Confederate Bushwhackers led by Rufus Henry Ingram

Captain Ingram's Partisan Rangers was the name given by the Sacramento Union to a band of about fifty Confederate Bushwackers organized from local Copperheads and members of the Knights of the Golden Circle in 1864 by Rufus Henry Ingram in Santa Clara County, California. They committed the Bullion Bend Robbery and planned other raids before being broken up by the Union authorities. They carried with them the Confederate Flag.

Newspapers of the time reported that Ingram had been a member of Quantrill's guerrilla band, but modern research has failed to confirm that. He came to California via Mexico with the intent of forming a Confederate guerrilla band on the Pacific Coast. After the gang was broken up in several bloody gunfights, Ingram fled California and vanished forever.

== Members ==
- Rufus Henry Ingram, Captain
- Thomas Bell Poole, Lieutenant
- George Baker
- John Creal Bouldware
- John Clenndenning
- Wallace Clenndenning
- George Cross
- James Frear
- Thomas Frear
- Joseph W. Gamble
- John Gately
- Alban H. Glasby
- Jim Grant
- Preston C. Hodges
- John Ingram
- Henry I. Jarboe
- Washington Jordan
- John A. Robinson
- James Wilson.

== See also ==
- California Civil War Confederate Units
