= Railroad Canyon =

- San Jacinto Canyon
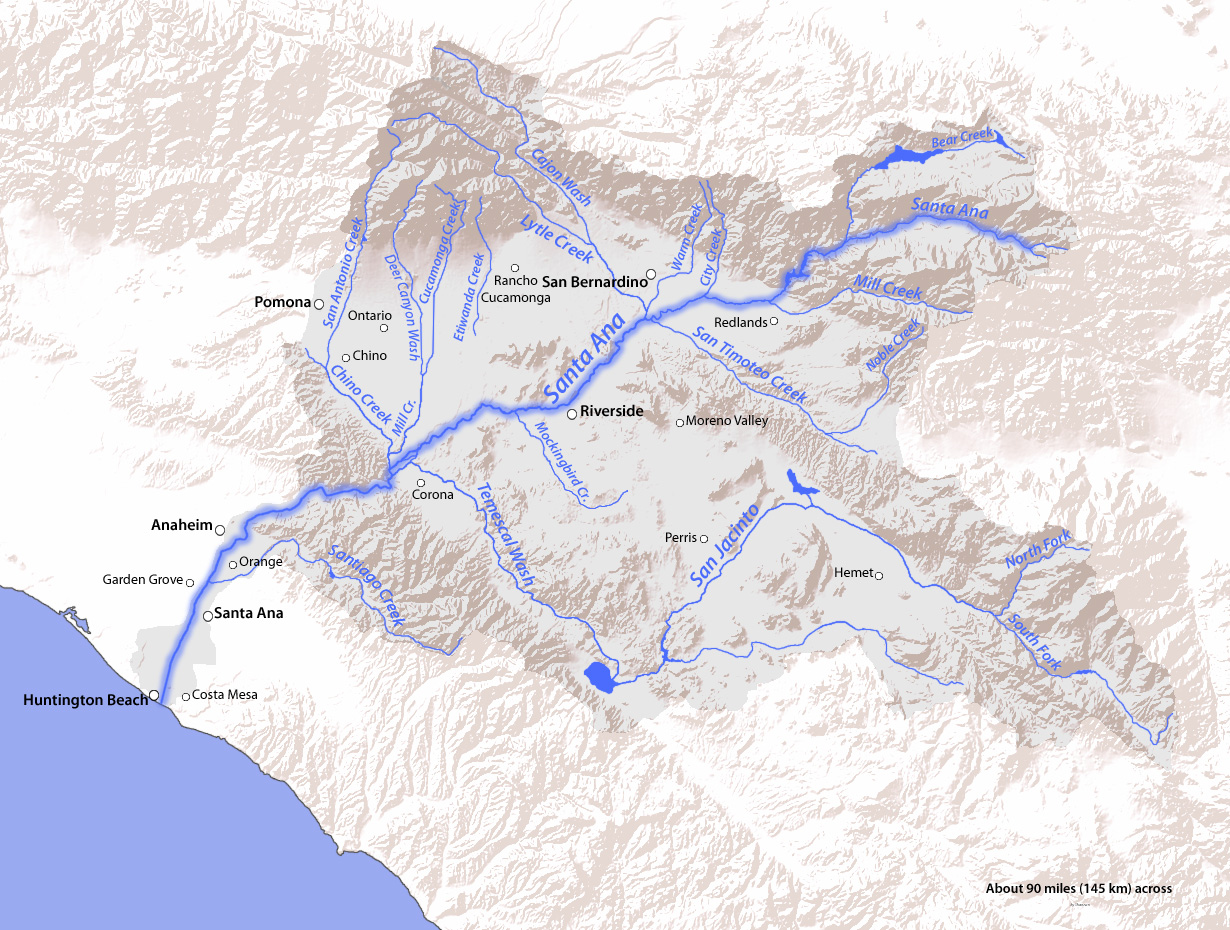
- Railroad Canyon, cut through the Temescal Mountains by the lower San Jacinto River, from 6 miles south-southwest of Perris to Lake Elsinore. The middle of the canyon contains Railroad Canyon Reservoir.
- Length: 7 mi (11 km)

Geography
- Location: United States, California, Riverside County
- Coordinates: 33.66°N 117.3°W

Railroad Canyon, originally named San Jacinto Canyon, also known as Cottonwood Canyon, and Annie Orton Canyon, is a valley located in Riverside County, California. It encloses the lower course of the San Jacinto River at the point where the river passes south through the Temescal Mountains from a point 6 miles south-southwest of Perris, California, through Canyon Lake, California, then west to Lake Elsinore, California. The canyon has its present name from the California Southern Railroad that was constructed down the canyon in 1882.

== History ==
On September 14, 1865, outlaw James Henry of the Mason Henry Gang and his gang of rustlers, robbers and murderers were camped out south of San Bernardino, California. San Bernardino County Sheriff Benjamin Franklin Mathews and his posse, led by John Rogers (a gang member sent to town to obtain provisions and captured after drunken boasting), found and surprised Henry camped in Railroad Canyon, then called San Jacinto Canyon, about 25 miles (40 km) south of town. At sunrise the posse approached cautiously but Henry awoke and fired three shots, striking one posse member in the foot. Henry died in a hail of gunfire, sustaining 57 wounds. His corpse was taken back to town, photographed and displayed in Old West fashion.

The California Southern Railroad constructed its main line to San Diego, down the San Jacinto Canyon from the Pincate Station south of what is now Perris to the Lake Elsinore Station in 1882. Flooding in 1927 destroyed the rail line in the canyon and it was abandoned. In 1928, the Railroad Canyon Dam was built, which flooded the canyon to produce the Railroad Canyon Reservoir, also called Canyon Lake.

Originally, the San Jacinto River ran southwestward across the Elsinore Valley through a delta wetland in the southeast end of Lake Elsinore near Rome Hill, but a flood control project enclosed the southeast end of the lake behind a levee and diverted the river into a boat channel just at the mouth of the canyon in recent years. Railroad Canyon is located on the USGS Lake Elsinore topographic map.

== See also ==
- List of Riverside County, California, placename etymologies#Railroad Canyon
