= Bushwhacker =

Form of guerrilla warfare during the American Revolutionary War and American Civil War

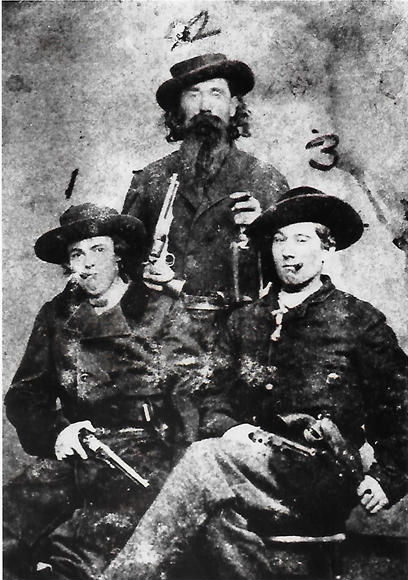
Three bushwackers: Archie Clement, Dave Pool, and Bill Hendricks

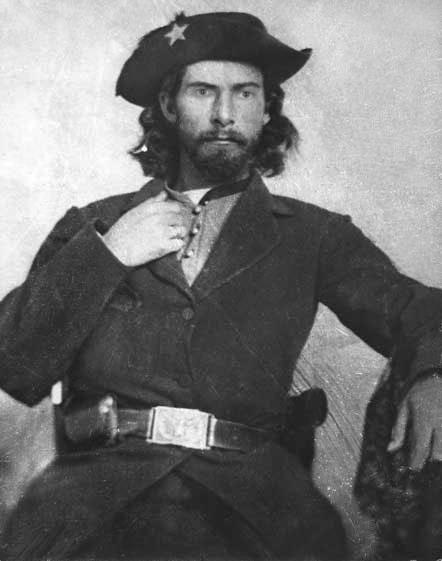
Notorious Confederate bushwhacker Bloody Bill Anderson

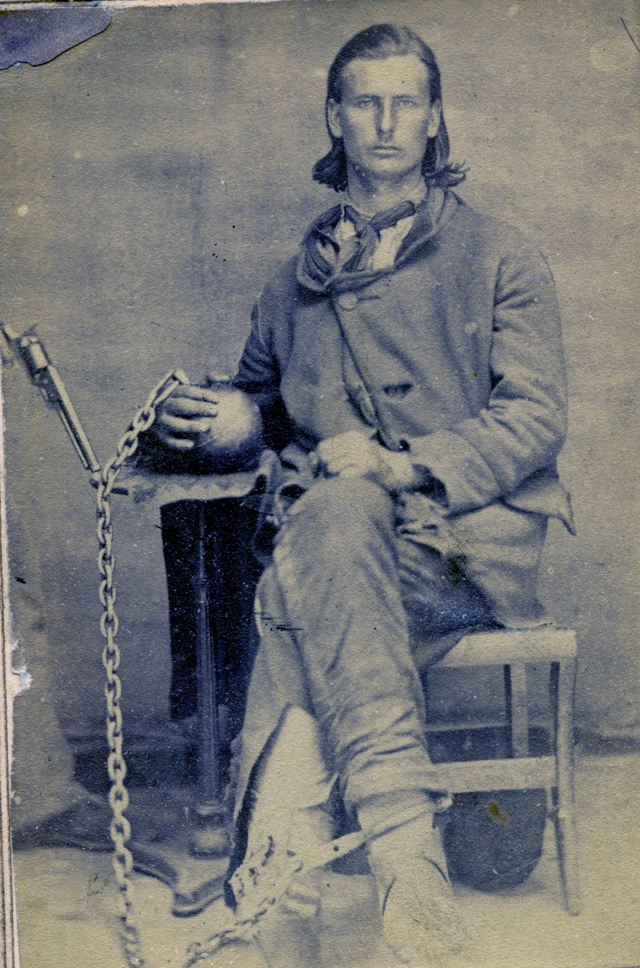
John Nichols, a bushwacker who operated in Johnson and Pettis Counties in 1862–1863, prior to his execution in Jefferson City, Missouri, October 30, 1863

Bushwhacking was a form of guerrilla warfare common during the American Revolutionary War, War of 1812, American Civil War and other conflicts in which there were large areas of contested land and few governmental resources to control these tracts. This was particularly prevalent in rural areas during the American Civil War where there were sharp divisions between those favoring the Union and Confederacy in the conflict. The perpetrators of the attacks were called bushwhackers. The term "bushwhacking" is still in use today to describe ambushes done with the aim of attrition.

Bushwhackers were generally part of the irregular military forces on both sides. While bushwhackers conducted well-organized raids against the military, the most dire of the attacks involved ambushes of individuals and house raids in rural areas. In the countryside, the actions were particularly inflammatory since they frequently amounted to fighting between neighbors, often to settle personal accounts.

== Union Jayhawkers and Confederate bushwhackers ==
The term "bushwhacker" came into wide use during the American Civil War (1861–1865). It became particularly associated with the pro-Confederate secessionist guerrillas of Missouri, where such warfare was most intense. Guerrilla warfare also wracked Kentucky, Tennessee, northern Georgia, Arkansas, and western Virginia (including the new state of West Virginia), among other locations.

In some areas, particularly the Appalachian regions of Tennessee and North Carolina, the term Bushwhackers was used for Confederate partisans who attacked Union forces. Residents of southern Alabama used the name in the same manner. Several bushwhacker bands operated in California in 1864.

Pro-Union guerrilla fighters in Kansas were called "Jayhawkers". They were involved in cross-border raids into Missouri.

== Partisan rangers ==
In most areas, guerrilla warfare operated as an adjunct to conventional military operations. The title adopted by the Confederate government in formally authorizing such insurgents was "partisan ranger". One of them was Col. John Singleton Mosby, who carried out raids on Union forces in the Shenandoah Valley and northern Virginia. He also raided to the north in Kentucky and Tennessee. Partisan rangers were also authorized in Arkansas.

In Missouri, however, secessionist bushwhackers operated outside of the Confederate chain of command. On occasion, a prominent bushwhacker commander might receive formal Confederate rank, as in the case of William Quantrill. Or they might receive written orders from a Confederate general, as "Bloody Bill" Anderson did in October 1864 during a large-scale Confederate incursion into Missouri, or as when Joseph C. Porter was authorized by Gen. Sterling Price to recruit in northeast Missouri. Missouri guerrillas frequently assisted Confederate recruiters in Union-held territory. For the most part, however, Missouri's bushwhacker squads were self-organized groups of young men, predominantly from the slave-holding counties along the Missouri and Mississippi rivers. They independently organized and fought against Federal forces and their Unionist neighbors, both in Kansas and Missouri. Their actions were in retaliation for what they considered a Federal invasion of their home state.

== Atrocities ==
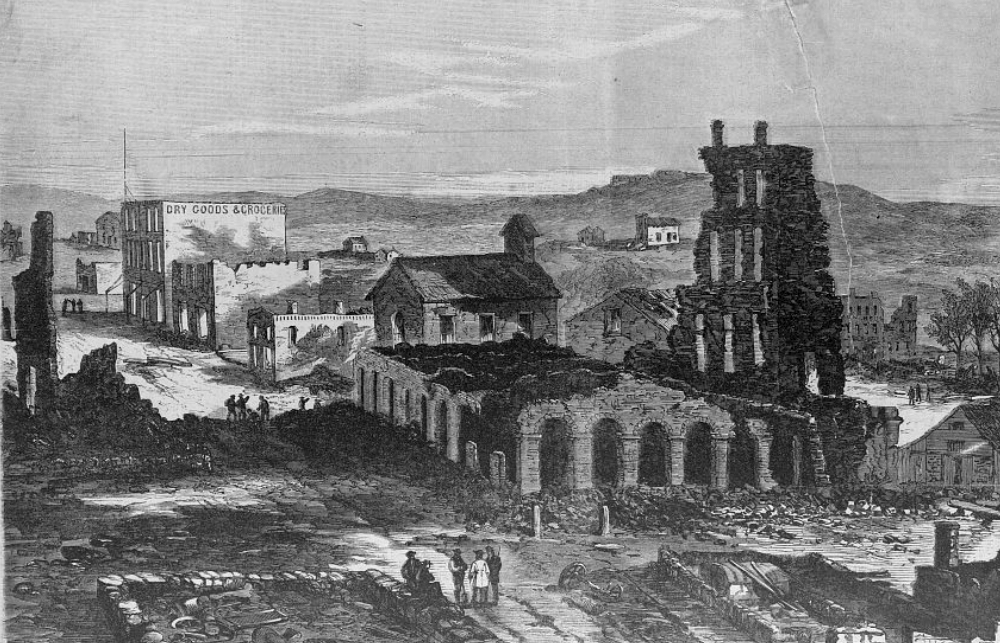
Lawrence in ruins, 1863

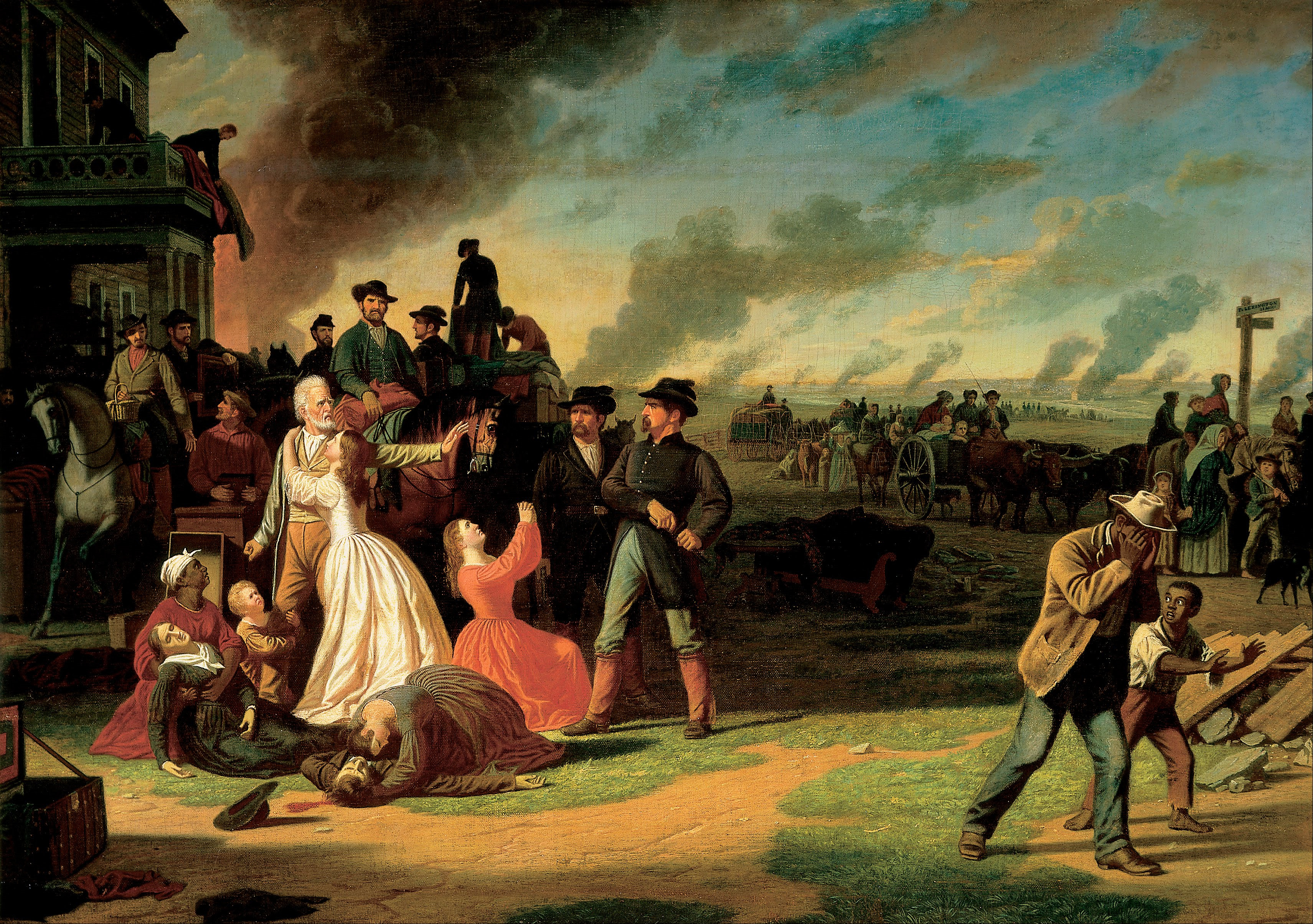
George C. Bingham's painting, "Order No. 11", 1868

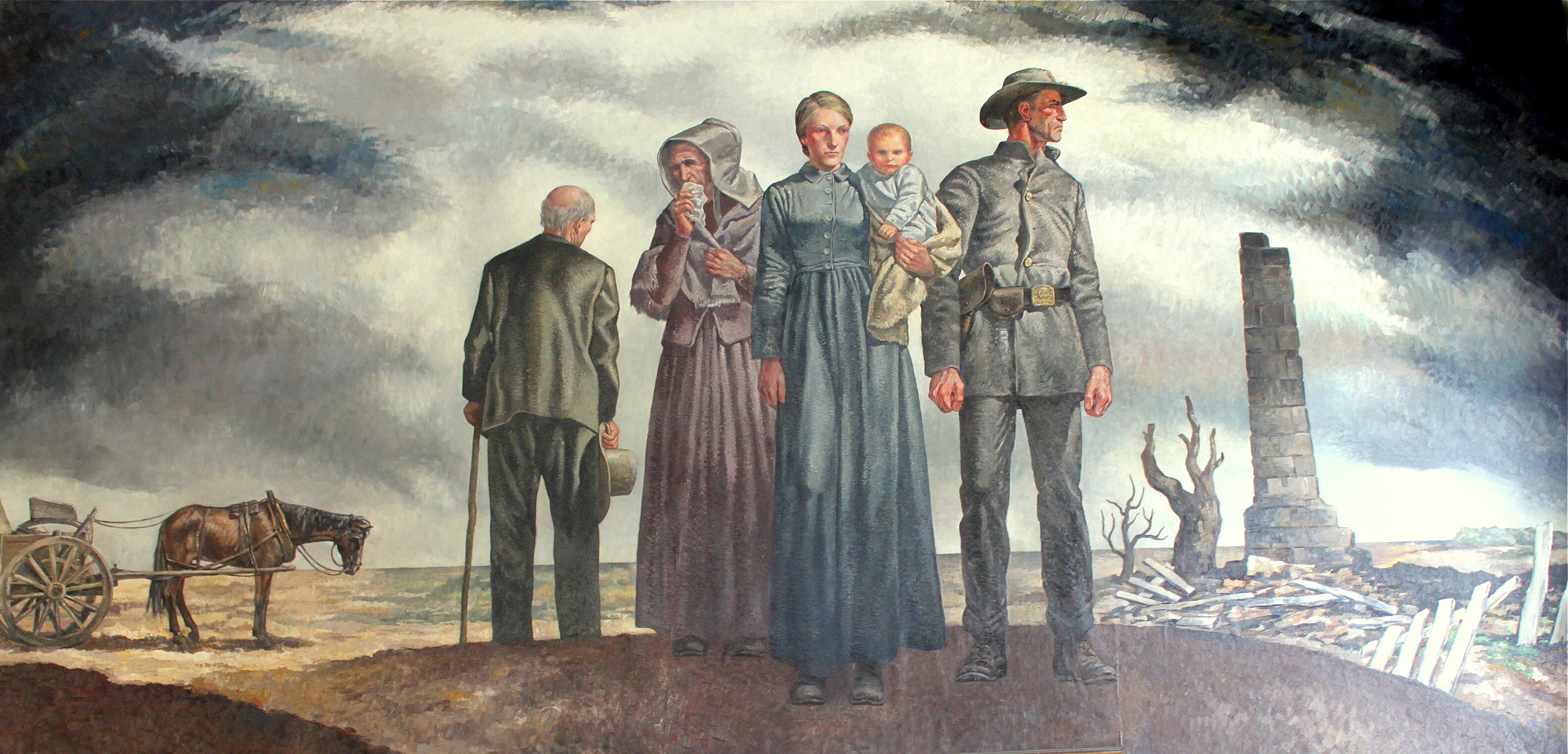
Thomas C. Lea III depicted the devastation brought down upon the Missouri countryside by the Civil War

The conflict with Confederate bushwhackers rapidly escalated into a succession of atrocities committed in Missouri. Hostage-taking and banishment were employed by local District and Union commanders to punish secessionist sympathizers. Individual families, including that of Jesse and Frank James and the maternal grandparents and mother of future President Harry Truman, were banished from Missouri.

Union troops often executed or tortured suspects without trial and burned the homes of guerrillas and those suspected of aiding or harboring them. If official credentials were doubted, the suspects were often executed, as in the case of Lt. Col. Frisby McCullough after the Battle of Kirksville. Bushwhackers retaliated by ambushing federal soldiers and frequently going house to house and executing Unionist sympathizers.

One of the most vicious actions during the Civil War by the bushwhackers was the Lawrence Massacre. William Quantrill led a raid in August 1863 on Lawrence, Kansas, burning the town and murdering some 150 men in Lawrence. Bushwhackers justified the raid as retaliation for the Sacking of Osceola, Missouri two years earlier, in which the town was set aflame and at least nine men killed, and for the deaths of five female relatives of bushwhackers killed in the collapse of a Kansas City, Missouri jail.

To end guerrilla raids into Kansas, the Union commander of the District of the Border, which comprised counties along the Missouri–Kansas state line, Thomas Ewing Jr., ordered the total depopulation of Jackson, Cass, Bates, and northern Vernon counties in Missouri under his General Order No. 11. Nearly twenty-five thousand rural inhabitants had to go to areas near Union camps or leave the state; their houses were burned to prevent them from returning; altogether, twenty-two hundred square miles of western Missouri became a desolation by the end of September 1863. A minister, George Miller, who lived in Kansas City, wrote, "For miles and miles we saw nothing but lone chimneys. It seemed like a vast cemetery – not a living thing to break the silence." The District of the Border became known as the "burnt district".

The Missouri–Arkansas border had been desolated as well. The Little Rock Arkansas Gazette wrote in August 1866:

Wasted farms, deserted cabins, lone chimneys marking the sites where dwellings have been destroyed by fire, and yards, gardens and fields overgrown with weeds and bushes are everywhere within view. The traveler soon ceases to wonder when he sees the charred remains of burnt buildings, and wonders rather when he beholds a house yet standing that it also did not disappear in the general conflagration. Such was the terrible intensity of the recent civil war ...

In other areas of Missouri, properties were also pillaged and destroyed by both warring sides since atrocities during the Civil War were in many ways a continuation of Bleeding Kansas violence.

== Centralia Massacre ==
Besides the Lawrence Massacre, the most notorious atrocity perpetrated by Confederate bushwhackers was the Centralia Massacre of September 27, 1864, in which 24 unarmed Union soldiers were pulled from a train in Centralia, Missouri, and murdered by a band of guerrillas under the command of "Bloody Bill" Anderson, in retaliation for the earlier execution of a number of Anderson's own men. In an ambush of pursuing Union forces shortly thereafter, the bushwhackers killed well over 100 Federal troops. In October 1864, Anderson was lured into an ambush and killed in the ensuing battle by soldiers of the pro-Union Missouri State Militia under the command of Col. Samuel P. Cox. Anderson's body was displayed following his death.

== Jesse James ==
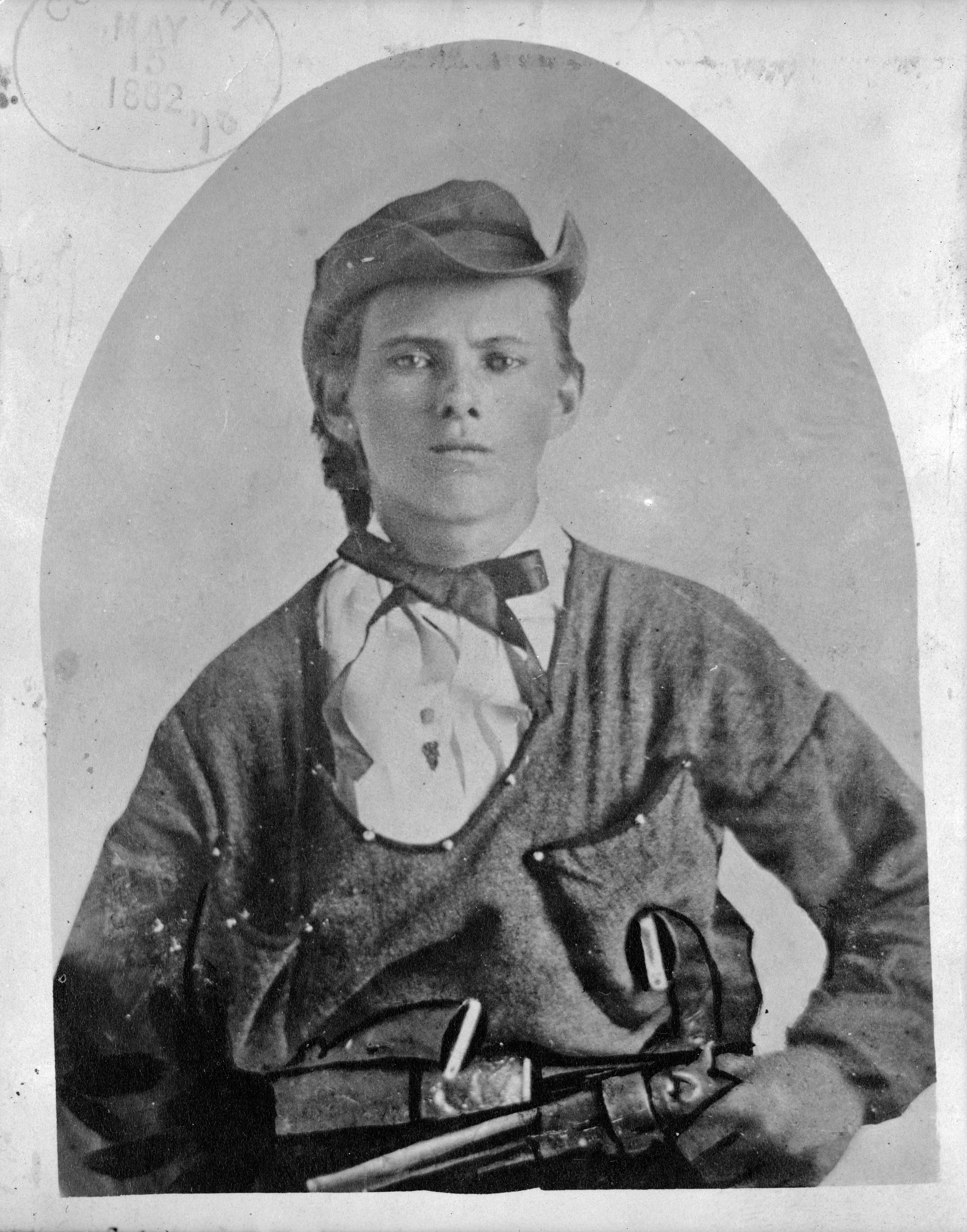
Jesse James at about 16 years of age

The guerrilla conflict in Missouri was, in many respects, a civil war within the Civil War. Jesse James began to fight as an insurgent in 1864. During months of often intense combat, he battled only fellow Missourians, ranging from Missouri regiments of U.S. Volunteer troops, to state militia, to unarmed Unionist civilians. The single confirmed instance of his exchanging fire with Federal troops from another state occurred a month after the 1865 surrender of Confederate General Robert E. Lee, during a near-fatal encounter with Wisconsin cavalrymen. In the course of the war, James's mother and sister were arrested, his stepfather tortured, and his family banished temporarily from Missouri by state militiamen—all Unionist Missourians.

== Postwar banditry ==
After the end of the war, the survivors of Anderson's band (including the James brothers) remained together under the leadership of Archie Clement, one of Anderson's lieutenants. In February 1866, they began a series of armed robberies. This group became known as the James-Younger Gang, after the death or capture of the older outlaws (including Clement) and the addition of former bushwhacker Cole Younger and his brothers. In December 1869, Jesse James became the most famous of this group when he emerged as the prime suspect in the robbery of the Daviess County Savings Association in Gallatin, Missouri, and the murder of cashier John W. Sheets. During Jesse James's flight from the scene, he declared that he had killed Samuel P. Cox and had taken revenge for Bloody Bill Anderson's death. (Cox lived in Gallatin, and the killer apparently mistook Sheets for the former militia officer.) Throughout James' criminal career, he often wrote to the newspapers portraying himself as a bushwhacker, and rallying the support of former Confederates and other Missourians who were harmed by Federal authorities during the Civil War and Reconstruction.

After the end of the war in 1865, the Mason Henry Gang continued as outlaws in Southern California with a price on their heads for the November 1864 "Copperhead Murders" in the San Joaquin Valley of three men they believed to be Republicans. Tom McCauley, known as "James" or "Jim Henry", was killed in a shootout with a posse from San Bernardino on September 14 of that year, in San Jacinto Canyon, in what was then San Diego County. John Mason was killed by a fellow gang member for the reward in April 1866 near Fort Tejon in Kern County.

In 1867, near Nevada, Missouri, a band of bushwhackers shot and killed Sheriff Joseph Bailey, a former Union brigadier general, who was attempting to arrest them. Among those suspected of his killing was William McWaters, who once rode with Anderson and Quantrill.

== In popular culture ==
- In the 1968 Western film Arizona Bushwhackers.
- Bushwhackers are the primary focus of the 1999 film Ride with the Devil.
- The bushwhackers are a major focus of Wildwood Boys (2000), a biographical novel of "Bloody Bill" Anderson by James Carlos Blake.
- The 1976 film The Outlaw Josey Wales depicts the activities of bushwhackers during and after the American Civil War.
- Bushwhackers appear in the side-stories of the 2004 HBO TV series Deadwood, set in South Dakota.
- The 2018 video game Red Dead Redemption 2 features a gang known as the Lemoyne Raiders, who operate as neo-Confederate bushwhackers.
- The Bushwhackers, a wrestling tag team from New Zealand, were part of the World Wrestling Federation from 1988 to 1996.

== See also ==
- Archie Clement
- Asymmetric warfare
- Bald Knobber
- Border Ruffian
- Thomas Bell Poole
- Hajduk
- Francs-tireurs
- Irregular warfare
- Knights of the Golden Circle
- Captain Ingram's Partisan Rangers
- Mason Henry Gang
- Kirkland Bushwhackers
