= The Last Days of Frank and Jesse James =

1986 TV film

- Written by: William Stratton
- Directed by: William A. Graham
- Starring: Kris Kristofferson; Johnny Cash; Willie Nelson
- Music by: Paul Chihara
- Country of origin: United States
- Original language: English

Production
- Producers: Joseph Cates; Phillip Cates
- Cinematography: Tony Imi
- Editor: Patrick McMahon
- Running time: 120 min

Original release
- Release: February 17, 1986

The Last Days of Frank and Jesse James is a 1986 American biographical Western television film directed by William A. Graham and starring Kris Kristofferson. The main cast is made up of country music all-stars, including Johnny Cash, June Carter Cash, David Alan Coe, Lecile Harris, Willie Nelson, and Marcia Cross.

== Cast ==
- Johnny Cash as Frank James
- Kris Kristofferson as Jesse James
- Marcia Cross as Sarah Hite
- Gail Youngs as Anna
- David Allan Coe as Whiskeyhead Ryan
- Andy Stahl as Dick Liddil
- June Carter Cash as Mother James
- Ed Bruce as Maj. Edwards
- Darrell Wilks as Bob Ford
- Margaret Gibson as Zee Mimms
- James Sinclair as Charley Ford
- Cherie Elledge-Grapes as Martha Bolton
- Peter Bradshaw as Wood Hite
- Earl Poole Ball as Squire Earthman
- Jack Barlow as Uncle George Hite
- Mac Bennett as Clarence Hite
- John Astor Brown as Gentleman
- Dan Butler as New York reporter
- Glen Clark as Angry man
- David Cobb as Dr. Samuels
- Bruce Carnahan as Sedalia reporter
- Ed Evans as Gov. Crittendon
- Marshall Fallwell Jr. as Jim Ward
- Buck Ford as William Pinkerton
- Donnie Fritts as Jury Foreman
- Lecile Harris as Bartender
- Mary Jane Harvill as Actress
- Dan Hoffman as Conductor Westfall
- John Jay Hooker Jr. as John Phillips
- G.W. Jones as Col. Starter
- Irv Kane as John Eulich
- Joe Kurtzo as French Joe Duval
- Jack Lawrence as Gallatin sheriff
- Slick Lawson as Ed Kelly
- William Newman as Sheriff Timberlake
- John Ramsey as Jake Igelhart
- Kal Roberts as Sam Whitsett
- Jack Wesley Routh as Train Supervisor
- John Jackson Routh as Jesse Jr., age 7
- Rick Schulman as Maddux
- Jimmy Tittle as Jim McDaniels
- Dennis Tucker as Bud McDaniels
- Byron Warner as William Wallace
- Charlie Williams as Judge
- Willie Nelson as Gen. Jo Shelby
- Charles Williams
