= The Assassination of Jesse James by the Coward Robert Ford (novel) =

1983 novel by Ron Hansen

- First edition
- Author: Ron Hansen
- Genre: Western novel
- Publisher: Knopf
- Publication date: 1983
- Pages: 304
- ISBN: 9780394516479

The Assassination of Jesse James by the Coward Robert Ford is a 1983 historical novel by American writer Ron Hansen. It explores the life and times of Jesse James and his gang, and his death at the hands of Robert Ford.

== Plot ==
The title is based on a folk song of the era. Based on extensive research into the many contemporary accounts of Jesse James' crimes and personal life, the novel weaves a third-person narrative of actual events with fictionalized imaginings of the lives of Jesse, his brother Frank, and their followers, including their guerrilla activities during the American Civil War and their insurgency afterward as notorious bank and train robbers. Though the James brothers achieved folk-hero fame for claims that they openly shared the loot from their robberies, the novel reveals they kept all the money for themselves.

Late in their career, the James brothers encounter Charley and Robert Ford, both of whom Jesse eventually recruits into his dwindling gang. Bob Ford is portrayed as a fawning sycophant who is obsessed with Jesse's national celebrity and hopes to one day attain similar renown for himself. As Jesse faces increasing pressure from the authorities, he begins to suspect those around him of conspiring to betray him. Indeed, the Fords end up negotiating a deal with the Governor of Missouri to capture or kill Jesse in exchange for the offered reward and exoneration of their previous crimes.

Following Jesse's murder, the Fords receive the promised acquittal and a portion of the reward money, but find themselves almost unanimously detested and ostracized by the American public. The stories of their subsequent lives and deaths are recounted against the backdrop of their notoriety as America's most reprehensible blackguards.

== Reception ==
In a 1983 book review, Kirkus Reviews remarked the book contained "well-written, artful descriptions. . . yet also drawing away to show us the frame like an announcer's binding narration" and noted that "only occasionally can [Hansen] get tension into this documentary approach; and the zooms between close-up and voice-over soon become predictable and sapping. Thoughtful, artful reconstruction — yet largely uninvolving."

The novel made the short list for the 1984 PEN/Faulkner Award.

== Adaptations ==
In March 2004, Warner Bros. and Plan B Entertainment obtained the feature film rights to the novel and hired Andrew Dominik to write and direct the adaptation. In 2007, the novel was adapted as a film of the same name written and directed by Dominik. It stars Brad Pitt as Jesse James, Casey Affleck as Robert Ford, and Sam Shepard as Frank James. Along with being on-set to ensure the dialogue was accurate to the era, Hansen appears in a cameo role as a frontier news reporter.
