= The True Story of Jesse James =

1957 film by Nicholas Ray

- Theatrical release poster
- Directed by: Nicholas Ray
- Screenplay by: Walter Newman
- Based on: Jesse James by Nunnally Johnson
- Produced by: Herbert B. Swope, Jr.
- Starring: Robert Wagner; Jeffrey Hunter; Hope Lange; Agnes Moorehead; Alan Hale Jr.
- Cinematography: Joseph MacDonald
- Edited by: Robert L. Simpson
- Music by: Leigh Harline
- Color process: Color by DeLuxe
- Production company: 20th Century Fox
- Distributed by: 20th Century Fox
- Release date: March 22, 1957
- Running time: 92 minutes
- Country: United States
- Language: English
- Budget: $1,585,000
- Box office: $1,500,000 (US rentals)

The True Story of Jesse James is a 1957 American Western drama film adapted from Henry King's 1939 film Jesse James, which was only loosely based on James' life. It was directed by Nicholas Ray, with Robert Wagner and Jeffrey Hunter portraying Jesse and Frank James, respectively. Filming took place during 1955. Originally titled The James Brothers in the United Kingdom, the film focused on the relationship between the two James brothers during the last 18 years of Jesse James' life.

== Plot ==
On September 7, 1876, Jesse and Frank James ride with their gang into Northfield, Minnesota on an unsuccessful bank robbery. During a gunfight, two members of the gang are killed and the James brothers escape to Missouri. Remington, the head of a detective agency, leads a posse on a manhunt for the James brothers to receive a $30,000 reward. During their search, Remington's posse kill gang member Sam Wells and capture Tucker, another gang member.

Years prior, during the Civil War, Frank joined the pro-Confederate guerrilla Quantrill's Raiders. The Jayhawkers interrogate their mother Zerelda and Jesse, who refuses to disclose his brother's whereabouts. Jesse leaves the farm in search for Frank, in which he joins the Confederate Army. When the war is over, he returns home wounded and is nursed back to health. Sometime later, Jesse envisions a peaceful farm life and proposes to Zee, the niece of Major Rufus Cobb.

On the day Jesse and Zee are baptized by Reverend Jethro Bailey, the James brothers discover their farm has been burnt and their friend Hughie has been hanged for riding with Quantrill's Raiders. A note found on Hughie's body warns the brothers they are next. In vengeance, the brothers form a gang with Jim and Cole Younger as they rob a Union-backed bank, with Jesse as the designated leader. Afterwards, Jesse is wanted dead or alive, and after each subsequent bank robbery, the reward increases. A fugitive from justice, Jesse marries Zee and lives under the alias Tom Howard.

In 1874, the fugitives hide out in the hills. After Tucker fails to cut the telegraph wires during a robbery, Jesse accuses him of betrayal, but Frank intercedes. Jesse then proceeds to rob railways, and his exploits make him a local folk hero. After the St. Louis Railway is robbed, gang member Bill Ryan is the first to be captured and later sentenced to 25 years in prison.

After Ryan's sentence, Jesse and Frank arrive at a train station where they are introduced to Remington. After the train stops en route, the brothers see Remington and Attorney Walker head towards their family farm. Suspecting the James brothers are hiding there, they detonate a bomb, which injures their mother and kills their half-brother, Archie.

The James brothers reassemble their gang for one last robbery at Northfield, Minnesota. Outside of town, Frank senses something isn't right and asks Jesse to call off the robbery, but Jesse refuses. The robbery goes wrong, and Jesse blames Tucker for failing to cut the telegraph wire at exactly 2:30 p.m. After the brothers argue, Frank goes on his separate way and rides off. Jesse then shoots Tucker and flees. Alerted by the gunshots, the posse search the area and finds Jesse's watch on Tucker's person.

The newspapers report of Jesse's death, but he returns home and collapses in exhaustion. Wanting a peaceful life, Jesse hands his pistols to gang members Charley and Robert Ford. When Robert learns of the reward money, he shoots Jesse dead and runs out into the street, proclaiming that he has just killed Jesse James. A crowd gathers outside the home, where Frank and Zerelda mourn his death. A Black folk singer, wearing a "Help the Poor" sign around his neck, sings "The Ballad of Jesse James".

== Cast ==
- Robert Wagner as Jesse James
- Jeffrey Hunter as Frank James
- Hope Lange as Zerelda "Zee" James, wife of Jesse
- Agnes Moorehead as Zerelda Cole James, mother of the James brothers
- Alan Hale, Jr. as Cole Younger
- John Carradine as Rev. Jethro Bailey
- Biff Elliot as Jim Younger
- Frank Gorshin as Charley Ford
- Carl Thayler as Robby Ford
- Adam Marshall as Dick Liddell
- Anthony Ray as Bob Younger
- Louis Zito as Clell Miller
- Paul Wexler as Jayhawker
- Clegg Hoyt as Tucker (uncredited)
- Frank Overton as Maj. Rufus Cobb
- John Doucette as Sheriff Hillstrom

== Production ==
Shortly after his success with 1955's Rebel Without a Cause, Ray was hired to direct this movie based on Jesse James' later life. He had only one movie left under his contract with 20th Century Fox, before he would depart for Europe and film Bitter Victory. The studio suggested a remake of King's 1939 biography of Jesse James.

It is speculated that had James Dean not died in a car crash before production began, he would have starred in this film as Jesse James. In place of Dean, director Ray hoped to cast Elvis Presley, who had successfully completed his first film, Love Me Tender. Ray's son Tony also was cast in the film as Bob Younger, the first time he appeared in one of his father's films.

Hope Lange, also a contract player for 20th Century Fox, as were Robert Wagner and Jeffrey Hunter, was hired for the role of Jesse's wife after her Academy Award-nominated success with Peyton Place. John Carradine had appeared in Fox's first Jesse James film as Bob Ford and appears in the 1957 version as Rev. Jethro Bailey.

Hunter and Ray reunited on King of Kings (1961).

== Reception ==
=== Box office ===
By January 1958, The True Story of Jesse James earned $1.5 million in box office rentals from the United States and Canada.

=== Critical reaction ===
Howard Thompson of The New York Times unfavorably compared the film to the 1939 film, writing it "lacks the bite, the consistent drive and the memorable acting of Mr. Johnson's version." William Brogdon of Variety wrote: "In the many past film reworkings of the 19th century delinquent's shoddy career just about every angle has been covered. There's nothing new in this CinemaScope-DeLuxe Color glorification. It's a routine offering for the outdoor market with Robert Wagner and Jeffrey Hunter in top roles."

Harrison's Reports wrote this version "offers little that is extraordinary, but its ingredients of violent action should give ample satisfaction to those who are partial to outdoor melodramas, and the attractive title should draw them to the box-office ... Acceptable performances are turned in by Robert Wagner, as Jesse, and Jeffrey Hunter, as Frank James, but better material would have given them an opportunity to be more effective. The photography is fine."

On the review aggregator website Rotten Tomatoes, 88% of 8 critics' reviews are positive, with an average rating of 6.8/10.

== Comic book adaptation ==
- Dell Four Color #757 (March 1957)

== See also ==
- The Assassination of Jesse James by the Coward Robert Ford

== Bibliography ==
- Eisenschitz, Bernard (1993). Nicholas Ray: An American Journey. Faber and Faber. ISBN 978-0-571-17830-8.
- Solomon, Aubrey (1989). Twentieth Century Fox: A Corporate and Financial History. Scarecrow Press. ISBN 978-0-810-84244-1.
