= The Assassination of Jesse James by the Coward Robert Ford =

2007 film by Andrew Dominik

- Theatrical release poster
- Directed by: Andrew Dominik
- Screenplay by: Andrew Dominik
- Based on: The Assassination of Jesse James by the Coward Robert Ford by Ron Hansen
- Produced by: Brad Pitt; Dede Gardner; Ridley Scott; Jules Daly; David Valdes
- Starring: Brad Pitt; Casey Affleck; Sam Shepard; Mary-Louise Parker; Paul Schneider; Jeremy Renner; Zooey Deschanel; Sam Rockwell
- Cinematography: Roger Deakins
- Edited by: Dylan Tichenor; Curtiss Clayton
- Music by: Nick Cave; Warren Ellis
- Production companies: Warner Bros. Pictures; Virtual Studios; Scott Free Productions; Plan B Entertainment
- Distributed by: Warner Bros. Pictures
- Release dates: September 2, 2007 (Venice); September 21, 2007 (United States)
- Running time: 160 minutes
- Country: United States
- Language: English
- Budget: $30 million
- Box office: $15.3 million

The Assassination of Jesse James by the Coward Robert Ford is a 2007 American epic revisionist Western film written and directed by Andrew Dominik. Based on Ron Hansen's 1983 novel of the same name, the film dramatizes the relationship between Jesse James and Robert Ford, focusing on the events that led up to the killing. It stars Brad Pitt as James and Casey Affleck as Ford, with Sam Shepard, Mary-Louise Parker, Paul Schneider, Jeremy Renner, Zooey Deschanel, and Sam Rockwell in supporting roles.

Photography started on August 29, 2005, and ended in December 2005. Filming took place near Calgary, Canmore, and Edmonton, Alberta, and Winnipeg, Manitoba. To achieve the visual style he wanted for the movie, Dominik took influences from many sources, including still photographers, images clipped from magazines, stills from Days of Heaven, and even Polaroids. The original edit of the movie was envisioned by Dominik to be "a dark, contemplative examination of fame and infamy", reaching more than three hours in runtime. This was opposed by the studio and the film was edited repeatedly.

The Assassination of Jesse James by the Coward Robert Ford had its world premiere at the 64th Venice International Film Festival on September 2, 2007, and was theatrically released in the United States on September 21, 2007, by Warner Bros. Pictures. The film received positive reviews from critics, who particularly praised Pitt and Affleck's performances and Roger Deakins' cinematography, but was criticized for its long runtime and was a box-office bomb. At the 80th Academy Awards, it earned two nominations: Best Supporting Actor for Affleck and Best Cinematography for Deakins. Affleck was also nominated for a Golden Globe, a Screen Actors Guild Award, and a Critics' Choice Award for Best Supporting Actor, while Pitt won the Volpi Cup for Best Actor. It has since gained a large fan following, with many of them organizing re-releases of the film under the "Jesse James Revival" banner.

== Plot ==
In 1881, young starstruck Robert "Bob" Ford seeks out Jesse James when the James Gang is planning a train robbery in Blue Cut, Missouri, making unsuccessful attempts to join the gang with the help of his older brother Charley, already a member. The train turns out to be carrying only a fraction of the money originally thought, and a dispirited Frank James leaves the gang and his brother. Jesse returns home to Kansas City, Missouri, bringing the Fords, Dick Liddil and Jesse's cousin, Wood Hite. Jesse sends Charley, Wood, and Dick away, but insists that Bob stays for help in moving furniture to a new home in St. Joseph, Missouri. Bob becomes more admiring of Jesse before being sent away. He stays at the farmhouse of his widowed sister, Martha Bolton, where he rejoins his brother Charley, Hite, and Liddil.

Liddil reveals to Bob that he is in collusion with another member of the James gang, Jim Cummins, to capture Jesse for a substantial bounty. Meanwhile, Jesse visits another gang member, Ed Miller, who gives away information on Cummins' plot. Jesse kills Miller, then departs with Liddil to hunt down Cummins. Unable to locate him, Jesse viciously beats Albert Ford, a young cousin of Bob and Charley who had hosted him. Later, Liddil stays with Hite at Hite's father's house, where he has sex with Hite's young stepmother. Upon learning this, Hite tracks Liddil down to Bolton's and holds him at gunpoint, but Bob intervenes, fatally shooting Hite. They dump his body in the woods to conceal the murder from Jesse.

Jesse appears at the Boltons' for dinner, where the Fords deny having seen Liddil recently. At dinner, Jesse mocks Bob for his idolization of him, leading Bob to become less enchanted with and more resentful of Jesse, especially after hearing about what was done to his cousin. Jesse and Charley travel to St. Joseph where Jesse learns of Hite's disappearance, about which Charley denies knowing anything. Meanwhile, Bob goes to Kansas City Police Commissioner Henry Craig, saying he knows Jesse's whereabouts. To prove his allegiance to the James Gang, Bob assists Craig and Sheriff James Timberlake with the arrest of Dick Liddil. Following Liddil's confession to participation in numerous gang robberies, Bob brokers a deal with the Governor of Missouri, Thomas T. Crittenden. He is given ten days to capture or kill Jesse and is promised a substantial bounty and a full pardon for Hite's murder.

Charley persuades Jesse to take Bob into the gang; the brothers return to St. Joseph. Introduced as cousins to Jesse's wife and two children, they stay with the family. Jesse wants to revive his gang by committing robberies with the Fords, beginning with the Platte City bank. During their stay, Jesse becomes increasingly suspicious of the brothers, not allowing them to be alone together. However, as the stay passes uneventfully, he later gives Bob a new nickel-plated gun as a token of apology. On the morning of April 3, 1882, as Jesse and the Ford brothers prepare to depart for the robbery, Jesse learns of Liddil's arrest from a newspaper. He suddenly removes his gun belt and climbs a chair to clean a dusty picture. Bob shoots Jesse in the back of the head with the gun given to him before fleeing with Charley. They send a telegram to the governor to announce Jesse's death, for which they were to receive $10,000. However, they never receive more than $500 each.

The Fords try to capitalize on the shooting, starring in a theater show in Manhattan which sees them re-enacting Jesse's murder, but people soon gradually become hostile towards the pair, hailing Jesse as a legend and calling Bob a "coward." The shows are eventually stopped after Bob loses his temper and beats an audience member for mocking him. Guilt-stricken, Charley writes numerous letters to Zee James asking for her forgiveness but never mails any of them. He commits suicide in May 1884. Bob tries to move on with his life, becoming increasingly regretful of his past actions. On June 8, 1892, Bob is murdered by Edward O'Kelley at his saloon in Creede, Colorado. O'Kelley is sentenced to life in prison, but he is pardoned after ten years in 1902.

== Cast ==
- Brad Pitt as Jesse James
- Casey Affleck as Robert Ford
- Sam Rockwell as Charley Ford
- Sam Shepard as Frank James
- Mary-Louise Parker as Zerelda James
- Paul Schneider as Dick Liddil
- Jeremy Renner as Wood Hite
- Garret Dillahunt as Ed Miller
- Zooey Deschanel as Dorothy Evans
- Michael Parks as Capt. Henry Craig
- Ted Levine as James H. Timberlake
- Alison Elliott as Martha Bolton
- James Carville as Gov. Thomas Theodore Crittenden
- Tom Aldredge as Maj. George Hite
- Kailin See as Sarah Hite
- Pat Healy as Wilbur Ford
- Michael Copeman as Edward Capehart O'Kelley

Ron Hansen made a cameo as a frontier reporter. The narration was provided by Hugh Ross, an assistant editor on the film. Nick Cave also appears as a folk singer in a saloon.

== Production ==
=== Development and casting ===
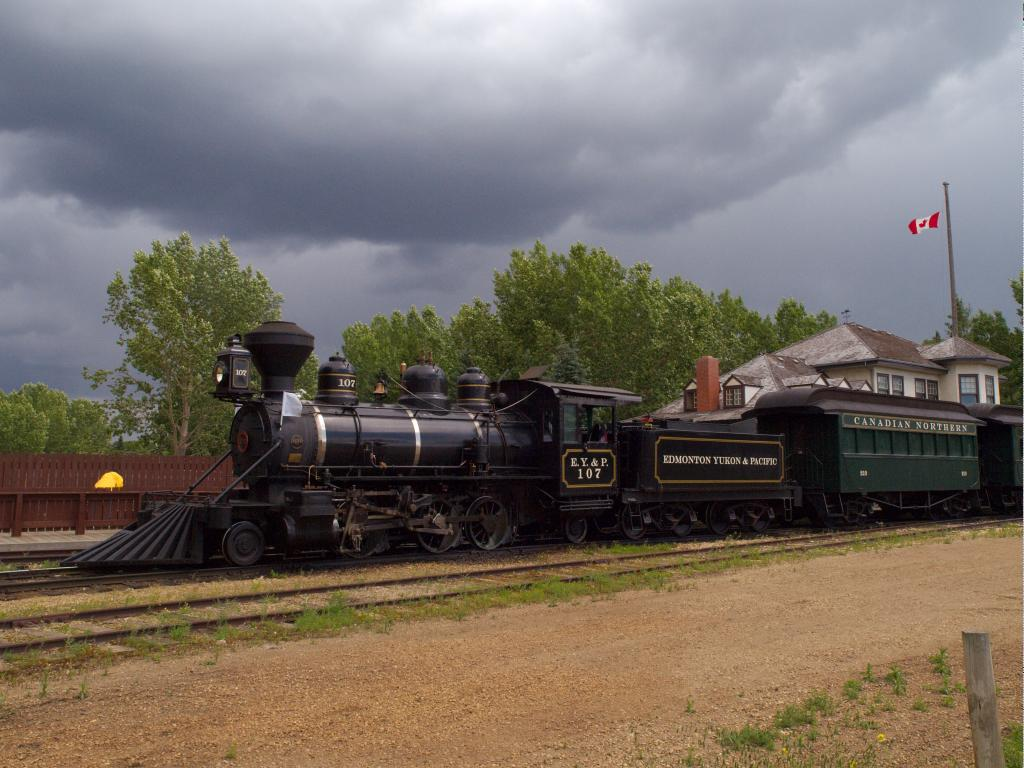
The working engine and train at Fort Edmonton Park was featured in the film.

In March 2004, Warner Bros. Pictures and Plan B Entertainment acquired feature film rights to Ron Hansen's 1983 novel The Assassination of Jesse James by the Coward Robert Ford. Andrew Dominik was hired to write and direct the film adaptation. Pitt was considered to portray Jesse James. The role of Ford eventually was between Affleck and Shia LaBeouf; Affleck was cast because it was felt that LaBeouf was too young. Bill Clinton's presidential campaign strategist James Carville was selected to play the Governor of Missouri. By January 2005, Pitt was cast.

=== Filming ===
Filming began on August 29, 2005, in Calgary. Filming also took place in other parts of Alberta, including the McDougall Church in Morley, Alberta, McKinnon Flats, Heritage Park, the Fairmont Palliser Hotel, the Kananaskis area, several private ranches and the historical Fort Edmonton Park. The historical town of Creede, Colorado was recreated at a cost of $1 million near Goat Creek in Alberta. Filming also took place in Winnipeg in the city's historic Exchange District; the Burton Cummings Theatre (formerly known as The Walker Theatre) and the Pantages Playhouse Theatre, and concluded in December 2005.

The film was initially edited by director Dominik to be "a dark, contemplative examination of fame and infamy," similar to the style of director Terrence Malick. The studio opposed Dominik's approach, preferring less contemplation and more action. One version of the film had a running time of more than three hours. Producers Pitt and Ridley Scott and editors Dylan Tichenor and Michael Kahn collaborated to assemble and test different versions. Tichenor left the production early to cut There Will Be Blood and was replaced by editor Curtis Clayton, who ultimately finished the production. Kahn was brought in for several weeks as the studio's "go to" editor. The test versions did not receive strong scores from test audiences. Despite the negative response, the audiences considered the performances by Pitt and Affleck to be some of their careers' best. Brad Pitt had it written into his contract that the studio could not change the name of the film.

=== Cinematography ===
Cinematographer Roger Deakins used a brown and black palette to produce the bleak and dreamlike quality of the film, which reminded some critics of Andrew Wyeth's work.

An exterior shot. The chromatic aberration around the edges is meant to imitate the look of old photographs.

One of the best-known sequences of the film is the Blue Cut train robbery. This was filmed on moonless nights and cinematographer Roger Deakins used various techniques to lend the train more presence in its pitch dark setting. Dominik and Deakins agreed on a foreboding atmosphere for the scene, and lit it using only the lanterns held up by the outlaws and the 5K tungsten PAR light mounted on the front of the train, standing in for the locomotive's dim kerosene headlamp. The PAR light was controlled by a dimmer, allowing it to illuminate the scene at full intensity as the train comes around a curve and into view and then progressively dimmed down so as not to flare the lens as it came closer to the camera. A series of dimmed 500-watt tungsten bulbs were also attached beneath and between the front wheels to enhance the glow from the engine's firebox. In order to deepen the blacks in this scene, Deakins ordered a slight bleach bypass on the negative along with subtle digital manipulation of shadows in the DI.

==== Deakinizers ====
Some scenes are notable for unusual lens choice. These passages display soft focus at the corners of the frame, along with color diffraction and various levels of vignetting. During pre-production Dominik had shown Deakins photographs taken with Petzval portrait lenses from the 1800s and asked if a similar look could be achieved on film.

In 1981 Deakins had shot a film called Towers of Babel, a Jonathan Lewis black comedy about council flats in London. The script called for POV shots as if through an apartment door's peephole. Deakins simulated the ultra-wide perspective by holding a bare lens element in front of a conventional 50mm lens through which a 35mm camera was shooting.

On Jesse James the effect Dominik had in mind was eventually achieved with a set of custom lenses designed by Deakins, Dan Lopez and Steve Hamerski of the Otto Nemenz rental house. Recalling his work on Towers of Babel Deakins had managed to reproduce many of the aberrations characteristic of the Petzval lenses by holding a bare lens element in front of a standard 50mm cine lens. He arrived at Nemenz, demonstrated this effect to Lopez and Hamerski, and asked whether Nemenz could supply a selection of lenses that produced a similarly primitive look.

The first lens created for this purpose was a wide-angle Kinoptic with one lens element removed. This had the effect of de-engineering some of the correction built into the lens. Deakins was so impressed with the result that he ordered a range of focal lengths from Nemenz. This kit was produced with four Arri Macro prime lenses modified to hold various single lens elements. Deakins recalls that,

[m]ost of those shots were used for transitional moments, and the idea was to create the feeling of an old-time camera. We weren't trying to be nostalgic, but we wanted those shots to be evocative. The idea sprang from an old photograph Andrew [Dominik] liked, and we did a lot of tests to mimic the look of the photo. Andrew had a whole lot of photographic references for the look of the movie, mainly the work of still photographers, but also images clipped from magazines, stills from Days of Heaven, and even Polaroids taken on location that looked interesting or unusual. He hung all of them up in the long corridor of the production office. That was a wonderful idea, because every day we'd all pass by [images] that immediately conveyed the tone of the movie he wanted to make.

The studio reportedly hated these lenses, and pressured Dominik to eliminate their use. Both Deakins and Dominik eventually regretted their limited deployment and wished they had used them to shoot more of the film.

Nemenz kept the four lenses it modified to shoot the film and was surprised to find them the subject of frequent rental requests. The set has come to be called the "Deakinizers", although Roger Deakins denies having coined the term. This table lists the lenses modified by Otto Nemenz. With the exception of the first, all Deakinizers are single element attachments that can be paired to any of the following Arri and Zeiss lenses:

===== Table of Deakinizers =====
Name	Focal Length	Pairing lens	T-stop
Deakinizer #1	44.5mm	Permanently modified wide-angle Kinoptik	2.0
Deakinizer #2	32mm	Arri Automatic Exposure Compensating Macro	2.1
Deakinizer #2A	50mm	Arri Automatic Exposure Compensating Macro	3.0
Deakinizer #3	60mm	Arri/Zeiss Automatic Exposure Compensating Macro	3.0

Several time-lapse sequences also appear throughout the film shot by Steadicam operator Damon Moreau. According to Moreau, he was dispatched to make a time-lapse when the crew was not quite ready to shoot a scene. These time-lapse sequences often accompanied the film's melancholic score.

=== Music ===
The music for the film was composed by Australian musicians Nick Cave and Warren Ellis who had collaborated previously to create the award-winning score for the Australian film The Proposition (2005).

Nick Cave has a minor part in the latter part of the film. He plays a strolling balladeer in a crowded bar performing "The Ballad of Jesse James", a folk song which describes Robert Ford as a coward, unaware that Ford himself is present.

Cave and Ellis released a double disc album titled White Lunar in September 2009, which contains several tracks from the Jesse James score, as well as tracks they composed for other films up to 2009.

== Release ==
The Assassination of Jesse James by the Coward Robert Ford was originally slated a release date for September 15, 2006. The release date was postponed to February 2007 at first, but ultimately set for a September 21, 2007, release, almost two years after filming was completed.

The film opened in limited release on September 21, 2007, in five theaters and grossed $147,812 in its opening weekend, an average of $29,256 per theater. The film has a total gross of less than $4 million.

Warner Home Video released the film on DVD on February 5, 2008 in the US, and on March 31 in the UK. So far, about 566,537 DVD units have been sold, bringing $9,853,258 in revenue.

== Reception ==
=== Critical response ===
On the review aggregator website Rotten Tomatoes, 76% of 174 critics' reviews are positive, with an average rating of 7.6/10. The website's consensus reads: "On the strength of its two lead performances Assassination is an expertly crafted period piece, and an insightful look at one of the enduring figures of American lore." Metacritic, which uses a weighted average, assigned the film a score of 68 out of 100, based on 32 critics, indicating "generally favorable" reviews.

Brian Tallerico of UGO gave the film an "A" and said that it is "the best western since Unforgiven." Tallerico also said, "Stunning visuals, award-worthy performances, and a script that takes incredibly rewarding risks, Jesse James is a masterpiece and one of the best films of the year." Kurt Loder of MTV said, "If I were inclined to wheel out clichés like 'Oscar-worthy', I'd certainly wheel them out in support of this movie, on several counts."

Richard Roeper on the television show Ebert & Roeper said, "If you love classic and stylish mood Westerns such as McCabe and Mrs. Miller and The Long Riders, this is your film." Roger Ebert noted the "curiously erotic dance of death" between James and the "mesmerized" younger Ford. Finally, he said, "If Robert cannot be the lover of his hero, what would be more intimate than to kill him?" He notes that it has the "space and freedom" of classic Western epics, where "the land is so empty, it creates a vacuum demanding men to become legends."

The Star-Ledger film critic Stephen Whitty gave the film four stars and called it an "epic film that's part literary treatise, part mournful ballad, and completely a portrait of our world, as seen in a distant mirror." Whitty also said that the film is "far superior" and "truer to its own world" than 3:10 to Yuma. Josh Rosenblatt of The Austin Chronicle gave the film 3.5 stars and said the film "grabs on to many of the classic tropes of the Western – the meandering passage of time, the imposing landscapes, the abiding loneliness, the casual violence – and sets about mapping their furthest edges."

Film critic Emanuel Levy gave the film an "A" and wrote, "Alongside Joel and Ethan Coen's No Country for Old Men, which is a Western in disguise, or rather a modern Western, Assassination of Jesse James is the second masterpiece of the season." Levy also wrote, "Like Bonnie & Clyde, Dominik's seminal Western is a brilliant, poetic saga of America's legendary criminal as well as meditative deconstruction of our culture's most persistent issues: link of crime and fame, myths of heroism and obsession with celebrity." Lewis Beale of Film Journal International said "Impeccably shot, cast and directed, this is a truly impressive film from sophomore writer-director Andrew Dominik... but suffers from an unfortunate case of elephantiasis." Beale said Affleck is "outstanding in a breakout performance" and said Pitt is "scary and charismatic." Beale wrote, "The director seems so in love with his languorous pacing, he's incapable of cutting the five or ten seconds in any number of scenes that could have given the film a more manageable running time. In the scheme of things, however, this amounts to little more than a quibble." Beale said that ultimately, the film is "a fascinating, literary-based work that succeeds as both art and genre film."

Critic Mark Kermode named the film as his best of 2007 in his end-of-year review on Simon Mayo's BBC radio programme. Kermode later wrote that historians a hundred years from now will consider it "one of the most wrongly neglected masterpieces of its era."

Many critics opined that the film is too long. Kirk Honeycutt of The Hollywood Reporter said that the relationship between Pitt and Affleck "gets smothered in pointlessly long takes, repetitive scenes, grim Western landscapes and mumbled, heavily accented dialogue." Los Angeles Daily News critic Bob Strauss gave the film 2.5 stars out of 4 and said, "To put it most bluntly, the thing is just too long and too slow." Strauss also said, "Every element of this Western is beautifully rendered. So why is it a chore to sit through?" Pam Grady of Reel.com gave the film 2 stars out of 4 and said, "The movie is merely a long, empty exercise in style." Stephanie Zacharek of Salon.com said that the film "represents a breakthrough in the moviegoing experience. It may be the first time we've been asked to watch a book on tape."

Peter Bradshaw's review in The Guardian noted James's contribution to his own demise as well as the apparent paradox in the title of both novel and film:

As his career draws to an end, Jesse James becomes aware of the impossibility of facing an increasingly vast army of sheriffs, federal agents and Pinkerton men. He senses that, inevitably, one of his gang will in any case sell him out for a fat reward. Unwilling to give the lawmen that satisfaction, James embraces his own death and subtly cultivates the mercurial attentions of the most obviously cringing and cowardly of his associates: 20-year-old Robert Ford. With the taunts and whims of a lover, he encourages Ford's envious, murderous fascination, and grooms him as his own killer, so that his own legend will be pristine after his death. He engineers a character-assassination of Ford, and the title, knowingly, gets it precisely the wrong way around.

Bradshaw took issue with the narration that often redundantly describes action clearly visible to the viewer on the screen. "The only false note is the use of a supercilious third-person narrative voiceover, which smudges the picture's crispness and clarity."

During a post-screening Q & A at the movie's "revival" in 2013, Dominik reported that when he showed Terrence Malick a cut of Jesse James, his reaction was "it's too slow," drawing a laugh from the audience.

Manohla Dargis of The New York Times called Roger Deakins' cinematography "impeccable, stark, high-contrast" and wrote that "the cinematography may speak to Mr. Dominik's yearning for meaning and importance more than it does of his outlaw, but the visuals often dazzle and enthrall." Deakins' work on the film is widely acclaimed and considered to be some of the best cinematography of the 21st century.

=== Top ten lists ===
The film appeared on many critics' top ten lists of the best films of 2007.

- 1st – Mark Kermode, BBC Radio 5 Live
- 1st – Peter Vonder Haar, Film Threat
- 1st – Ray Bennett, The Hollywood Reporter
- 1st – Matt Cale, Ruthless Reviews
- 2nd – Dennis Harvey, Variety
- 3rd – Claudia Puig, USA Today
- 3rd – Mick LaSalle, San Francisco Chronicle
- 4th – Tom Charity, CNN
- 4th – Jack Mathews, New York Daily News
- 4th – Scott Tobias, The A.V. Club
- 5th – Empire magazine
- 5th – Keith Phipps, The A.V. Club
- 5th – Tasha Robinson, The A.V. Club
- 6th – Scott Foundas, LA Weekly
- 6th – Jonathan Rosenbaum, Chicago Reader
- 7th – Sight & Sound magazine
- 9th – Lisa Schwarzbaum, Entertainment Weekly
- 9th – Nick Schager, Slant Magazine
- 9th – Michael Phillips, Chicago Tribune
- 10th – J. Hoberman, The Village Voice

=== Accolades ===
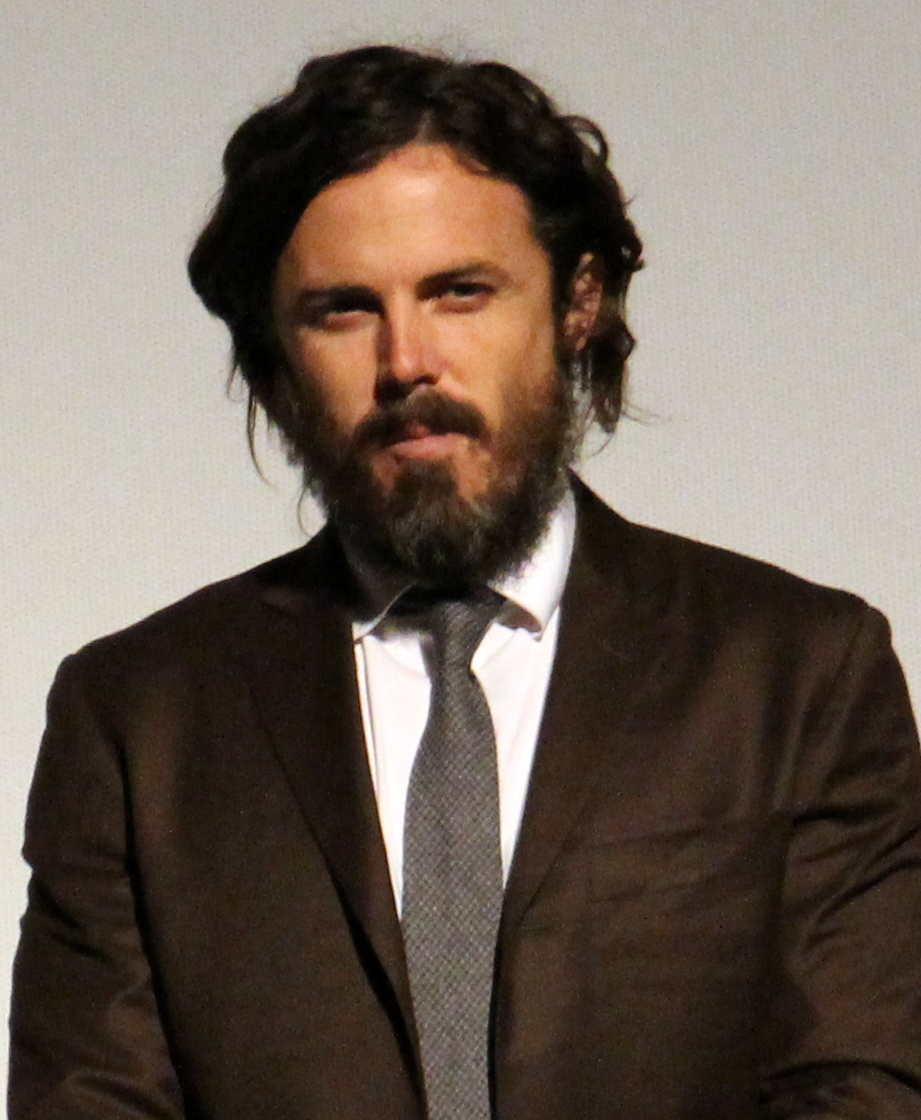
Casey Affleck's portrayal of Robert Ford received critical acclaim, earning him a nomination for the Academy Award for Best Supporting Actor.

The Assassination of Jesse James by the Coward Robert Ford was identified by the National Board of Review of Motion Pictures as one of the top 10 films of 2007. The board also named Casey Affleck as Best Supporting Actor in the film. The San Francisco Film Critics Circle named The Assassination of Jesse James by the Coward Robert Ford as the Best Picture of 2007. The circle also awarded Affleck as best supporting actor for the film. Affleck was nominated for Best Performance by an Actor in a Supporting Role in a Motion Picture for the 65th Golden Globe Awards.

The film received two Academy Award nominations for the 80th Academy Awards. Affleck was nominated for Best Supporting Actor and Roger Deakins was nominated for Best Cinematography. Earlier in the year, Brad Pitt won the prestigious Volpi Cup for Best Actor when the film premiered at the annual Venice Film Festival. Several other awards circles also awarded composers Nick Cave and Warren Ellis for their music in the film (see below).

The film also holds a place on Empire's recent list of The 500 Greatest Films of All Time, coming in at #396. In 2016, it was voted the 92nd best film since 2000 in an international critics' poll.

In July 2025, it was one of the films voted for the "Readers' Choice" edition of The New York Times' list of "The 100 Best Movies of the 21st Century," finishing at number 239. That same month, it ranked number 87 on Rolling Stone's list of "The 100 Best Movies of the 21st Century."

Award	Category	Recipient(s)	Result
Academy Awards	Best Supporting Actor	Casey Affleck	Nominated
Academy Awards	Best Cinematography	Roger Deakins	Nominated
American Society of Cinematographers	Outstanding Achievement in Cinematography	Roger Deakins	Nominated
Broadcast Film Critics	Best Supporting Actor	Casey Affleck	Nominated
Chicago Film Critics	Best Cinematography	Roger Deakins	Won
Chicago Film Critics	Best Original Score	Nick Cave; Warren Ellis	Nominated
Chicago Film Critics	Best Supporting Actor	Casey Affleck	Nominated
Dallas–Fort Worth Film Critics	Top Ten Films of the Year		9th Place
Dallas–Fort Worth Film Critics	Best Cinematography	Roger Deakins	Won
Dallas–Fort Worth Film Critics	Best Supporting Actor	Casey Affleck	3rd Place
Detroit Film Critics	Best Supporting Actor	Casey Affleck	Nominated
Empire Awards	Best Film		Nominated
Film Critics Circle of Australia Awards	Best Foreign Film - English Language	Andrew Dominik	Nominated
Florida Film Critics Circle	Best Cinematography	Roger Deakins	Won
Golden Globe Awards	Best Supporting Actor – Motion Picture	Casey Affleck	Nominated
Golden Reel Awards	Best Sound Editing - Music in a Feature Film	Gerard McCann; William B. Kaplan; Jonathan Karp	Nominated
Golden Trailer Awards	Best Drama Poster		Won
Golden Trailer Awards	Best Voice Over		Won
Houston Film Critics	Best Cinematography	Roger Deakins	Won
International Cinephile Society	Top Ten Films of the Year		4th Place
International Cinephile Society	Best Supporting Actor	Casey Affleck	Won
International Cinephile Society	Best Cinematography	Roger Deakins	Won
International Cinephile Society	Best Original Score	Nick Cave; Warren Ellis	2nd Place
Italian Online Movie Awards	Best Cinematography		Won
Italian Online Movie Awards	Best Actor in a Supporting Role	Brad Pitt	Nominated
Las Vegas Film Critics	Top Ten Films of the Year		4th Place
London Film Critics	Actor of the Year	Casey Affleck	Nominated
London Film Critics	Film of the Year		Nominated
National Board of Review	Top Ten Films of the Year		Nominated
National Board of Review	Best Supporting Actor	Casey Affleck	Won
National Society of Film Critics	Best Supporting Actor	Casey Affleck	Won
Online Film Critics Society	Best Cinematography	Roger Deakins	Nominated
Online Film Critics Society	Best Score	Nick Cave; Warren Ellis	Nominated
Online Film Critics Society	Best Supporting Actor	Casey Affleck	Nominated
San Francisco Film Critics	Best Picture		Won
San Francisco Film Critics	Best Supporting Actor	Casey Affleck	Won
Satellite Awards	Best Supporting Actor	Casey Affleck	Won
Satellite Awards	Best Art Direction and Production Design	Patricia Norris; Martin Gendron; Troy Sizemore	Nominated
Satellite Awards	Best Cinematography	Roger Deakins	Nominated
Satellite Awards	Best Score	Nick Cave	Nominated
Screen Actors Guild Awards	Outstanding Performance by a Male Actor in a Supporting Role	Casey Affleck	Nominated
Southeastern Film Critics	Top Ten Films of the Year		7th Place
St. Louis Gateway Film Critics	Best Picture		Nominated
St. Louis Gateway Film Critics	Best Supporting Actor	Casey Affleck	Won
St. Louis Gateway Film Critics	Best Cinematography	Roger Deakins	Won
St. Louis Gateway Film Critics	Best Score	Nick Cave; Warren Ellis	Nominated
Utah Film Critics Association	Top Ten Films of the Year		Nominated
Utah Film Critics Association	Best Actor	Casey Affleck	Nominated
Vancouver Film Critics	Best Supporting Actor	Casey Affleck	Nominated
Venice Film Festival	Golden Lion	Andrew Dominik	Nominated
Venice Film Festival	Volpi Cup for Best Actor	Brad Pitt	Won
Western Writers of America	Best Western Drama	Andrew Dominik	Won
