= Andrew Stahl =

American actor

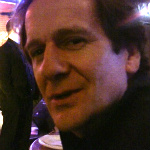
- Years active: 1984–present

Andrew Stahl is an American actor, best known for appearing as Tom McHone in the Christy series and General Armand Stassi in seaQuest 2032.

== Life and career ==
As a child, Stahl moved around a lot due to his father's work as an airline pilot. He moved with his parents to a farm in Butler County, Kentucky when he was young. He graduated from University High School in Bowling Green, Kentucky in 1970 and Western Kentucky University (WKU) in 1975. At WKU, Stahl served as one of the section editors of WKU's yearbook, The Talisman. He was a member of Sigma Nu fraternity, Eta Rho chapter.

Early in his career, he spent time as a musician and visual artist before taking up acting in local regional theater. He spent a short period of time in New York City in the early 1980s, where he studied with Wynn Handman, William Hickey and Jack Waltzer and performed in various Off Broadway productions. He currently lives on his family farm in Butler County, Kentucky and works out of Atlanta, Georgia and Nashville, Tennessee. He has one son.

Stahl has appeared as the host of a cable educational series created by the Kentucky Blues Society to spotlight Kentucky blues artists.

== Filmography ==
- Rearview Mirror (TV) (1984) .... Henry Davenport
- The River (1984) .... Dave Birkin
- Invasion U.S.A. (1985) .... Christmas Father
- North and South (mini series) (1985) .... Cadet Ned Fisk
- North and South, Book II (mini-series) (1986) .... Major Ned Fisk
- The Last Days of Frank and Jesse James (1986) .... Dick Liddil
- Mayflower Madam (TV) (1987) .... Stuart
- Unconquered (TV) (1989) .... Father Dante
- Ernest Goes to Jail (1990) .... Jerry
- Mr. Destiny (1990) .... Jerry Haskins
- The Real McCoy (1993) .... Mr. Kroll
- The Client (1994) .... FBI Agent Scherff
- Follow the River (1995) .... Henry Lenard
- Christy (TV) (1994–1995) .... Tom McHone
- SeaQuest 2032 (1995) .... General Armand Stassi
- Tom and Huck (1995) .... Sheriff
- Andersonville (TV) (1996) .... Jury Foreman
- Our Son, the Matchmaker (TV) (1996) .... Walter Longwell
- A Time to Kill (1996) .... Reluctant Male Juror
- The People vs. Larry Flynt (1996) .... Network Lawyer
- What the Deaf Man Heard (TV) (1997) .... Finis
- October Sky (1999) .... Jack Palmer
- The Patriot (2000) .... General Nathanel Greene
- Christy: Return to Cutter Gap (TV) (2000) .... Tom McHone
- Christy, Choices of the Heart, Part I: A Change of Seasons (mini-series) (2001) .... Tom McHone
- Christy, Choices of the Heart, Part II: A New Beginning (mini-series) (2001) .... Tom McHone
- Rustin (2001) .... Mr. Gatlin
- Furnace (2006) .... Warden Patt
- Glory Road (2006) .... Dr. Ray
- Big Momma's House 2 (2006) .... Principal
- Supernatural (TV) (The Usual Suspects) (2006) .... Jeff Krause
- Fantastic Four: Rise of the Silver Surfer (2007) .... Tailor
- The Mist (2007) .... Mike Hatlen
- The L Word (TV) ("Lay Down the Law") (2008) .... Ranking Member
- The Blind Side (2009) .... Principal Sandstrom
- State of Emergency (2013) .... Pivens
- The Bay (2012) .... Sheriff Lee Roberts
- Reckless (2013) TV film
- Table 19 (2017) .... Henry Grotsky

Stahl also appeared in The Journey of August King. On television Stahl appeared on Matlock, In the Heat of the Night and seaQuest DSV.
