= James Timberlake =

American lawman (1846–1891)

- Born: James H. Timberlake; March 22, 1846; Platte County, Missouri, U.S.
- Died: February 21, 1891 (aged 44); Liberty, Missouri, US
- Occupations: Lawman, rancher, farmer, soldier
- Years active: 1876–1882
- Known for: Pursuing the James-Younger Gang
- Opponents: Frank James; Jesse James
- Spouse: Katie Thomason
- Military career
- Allegiance: Confederate States of America
- Branch: Confederate States Army
- Service years: 1864
- Rank: Second Lieutenant
- Conflicts: American Civil War

James H. Timberlake (March 22, 1846 – February 21, 1891) was an American Old West lawman, Civil War soldier, farmer and rancher who served as a Deputy U.S. Marshal for the Western District of Missouri. Timberlake is best known for being the chief enforcer and investigator against the James-Younger Gang, beginning in the 1870s, which culminated in the death of the outlaw Jesse James on April 3, 1882, at the hands of Robert Ford.

== Life and career ==
James Timberlake was born on March 22, 1846, in Platte County, Missouri, to farmer John Timberlake and his wife Patsy Noland. Timberlake remained at home to help on his family farm until 1864, when he joined the Cavalry Division of the Army of Missouri, under the command of Colonel Alonzo W. Slayback in the American Civil War. Timberlake became a Second Lieutenant and participated in a number of engagements under the command of General Joseph O. Shelby. Following the surrender of the Confederate States of America, Timberlake accompanied Shelby and his one thousand-plus men into Mexico to pledge allegiance to Emperor Maximilian I of Mexico. Maximilian declined this offer, but granted land to the troops. In December 1865, Timberlake abandoned his life in Mexico and returned to Missouri to resume farming and raising stock.

On November 25, 1874, Timberlake was married to Katie Thomason, the daughter of Grafton Thomason, who was a founder of Liberty, Missouri. In 1876, Timberlake was appointed Town Constable of Liberty, MO but was discharged in 1878 so that he could be appointed as the new County Sheriff.

When the James-Younger Gang rose to prominence in the 1870s, Timberlake teamed up with Kansas City's Police Commissioner Henry H. Craig to investigate and pursue the outlaws. Timberlake became the primary investigator of the gang and soon gained recognition from Governor Thomas Theodore Crittenden, who claimed Timberlake was largely responsible for the dissolution of the gang in 1882. In January 1882, outlaws Robert Ford, Charles Ford and Dick Liddil surrendered to Timberlake at the Fords' sister, Martha Bolton's residence in Ray County, Missouri, on the condition that they would receive full pardons and $10,000 in reward money, in exchange for the death or imprisonment of the gang's ringleader, Jesse James. Robert Ford directed Timberlake to Adairville, Kentucky, where he arrested Jesse James' cousin, Clarence Hite on February 11, 1882. On March 24, 1882, Timberlake detailed a plan he designed in collaboration with Crittenden, which entailed that the Fords would have ten days to apprehend James, or else the pardon and reward would not stand. When Robert Ford killed James on April 3, 1882, Crittenden resented that an apprehension was not made and paid the majority of the reward to Timberlake.

Following the death of Jesse James, Timberlake, along with the other conspirators in the mission to assassinate James found their reputations ruined, due in large to the nature in which James was killed. Timberlake, having completed his second term as County Sheriff, declined to run for re-election, in favor of running for County Tax Collector, but was soundly defeated, thanks to a smear campaign run by supporters of James' cause. He retreated to New Mexico, where he and his brother maintained successful ranches. However, Timberlake returned to Missouri in 1883, when he was reappointed Deputy U.S. Marshal for the Western District of Missouri by Crittenden. He resigned soon after his wife died, however, and returned to farming and remained working at the stables until he died from an opioid overdose of morphine, prompted by his insomnia, on February 21, 1891.

== Cultural depictions ==
- In the 1986 film The Last Days of Frank and Jesse James, Timberlake is portrayed by William Newman.
- In the 2007 film The Assassination of Jesse James by the Coward Robert Ford, based on the historical novel by Ron Hansen, Timberlake is portrayed by Ted Levine.
- In the 2009 History documentary Jesse James' Hidden Treasure, Timberlake is portrayed by Dwayne Dresser.
- In the 1980 concept album The Legend of Jesse James, the narrative vocals for Timberlake are performed by Paul Kennerley.
