= James Robert Cummins =

American criminal

James Robert Cummins or Cummings, a.k.a. "Windy Jim" (January 31, 1847 – July 9, 1929) was an American criminal.

Cummins lived near Kearney, Missouri and rode with Quantrill's Raiders during the Civil War, most often assigned to follow Bloody Bill Anderson. A known horse thief, he joined up with the James-Younger Gang after the war and was involved in the train robberies at Winston and Blue Cut, Missouri. After the breakup of the James Gang, he became a farmer in Arkansas and actually tried to turn himself in several times, but no one believed he was really Jim Cummins. At the age of 63 he married Florence Sherwood and lived to an old age.

In 1903 he published a memoir of his time with the James-Younger gang, "Jim Cummins' Book Written by Himself, The Life Story of the James and Younger Gang and Their Comrades, Including the Operations of Quantrell's Guerrillas, By One Who Rode With Them: A True But Terrible Tale of Outlawry." He died in the Old Soldiers Home at Higginsville, Missouri, on July 9, 1929.
