= Follow the River (film) =

- Genre: Drama
- Written by: Jennifer Miller
- Directed by: Martin Davidson
- Starring: Sheryl Lee; Ellen Burstyn; Tim Guinee; Andy Stahl; Eric Schweig; Renee O'Connor
- Theme music composer: Ernest Troost
- Country of origin: United States
- Original language: English

Production
- Producer: Alvin Cooperman
- Cinematography: Michael Gershman
- Editor: Bonnie Koehler
- Running time: 91 minutes
- Production company: Signboard Hill Productions

Original release
- Network: ABC
- Release: April 22, 1995

Follow the River is a 1995 ABC television movie, based on the book Follow the River by James Alexander Thom, that recounts the aftermath of the Draper's Meadow Massacre of 1755. In particular the kidnapping of Mary Ingles by Shawnee, her enslavement, escape, and epic overland journey to reach home.

== Cast ==
- Sheryl Lee as Mary Ingles
- Ellen Burstyn as Gretel
- Tim Guinee as Will Ingles
- Andy Stahl as Henry Lenard
- Eric Schweig as Wildcat
- Renee O'Connor as Bettie Draper
