= Wood Hite =

19th-century American outlaw

- Born: Robert Woodson Hite c. 1850; Logan, Kentucky, US
- Died: December 4, 1881 (aged 30–31); Ray County, Missouri, US
- Cause of death: Gunshot wound to the head
- Other name: "Wood" Hite
- Occupation: Outlaw
- Known for: Cousin to Jesse and Frank James; member of James-Younger Gang; killed by Robert Ford and Dick Liddil

Robert Woodson "Wood" Hite (c. 1850 – December 4, 1881) was an outlaw and cousin of Frank and Jesse James. He was a member of the James-Younger gang, participating in a number of robberies and other crimes. He was shot dead by Robert Ford during a gunfight with Ford's friend Dick Liddil. The death of Hite precipitated the series of events that culminated in the killing of Jesse James by Ford.

== Early life ==
Wood Hite was born in about 1850 in Logan, Kentucky, to George Burns Hite and Nancy Gardner Hite (nee James). His mother was the sister of Robert Sallee James, the father of Frank and Jesse James of the James-Younger Gang, making Wood a first cousin to the James brothers.

Hite fought for the Confederacy in the American Civil War as a member of William T. Anderson's raiders.

== Criminal career ==
After the disastrous Northfield Minnesota raid in 1876, James needed new gang members. Wood and his brother Clarence joined the gang.

Hite was described as being between 5'8" and 5'10" with dark sandy hair, light complexion, a prominent Roman nose, and stooped shoulders that made him appear slouched. In his book The Life, Times and Treacherous Death of Jesse James, author Frank Triplett described him as "a great admirer of himself, as well as of the opposite sex". Bill O'Neal describes him as a "gangling, stoop-shouldered man with prominent, decaying front teeth." Easily recognized, he was quickly forced into hiding after he was identified following robberies by the gang.

In 1881 Hite was arrested after shooting and killing John Tabor, a black man who had made Hite angry. Tabor was shot while sitting on a fence. Hite's stepmother, who witnessed the murder, gave sworn testimony against him. He escaped from jail after bribing one of his guards.

== Death ==
Hite was shot to death on December 4, 1881, in Ray County, Missouri, by Dick Liddil and Robert Ford, also members of the James-Younger Gang. All three were staying at the house of Martha Bolton, Ford's widowed sister. Hite and Liddil were both attracted to Martha, and clashed over their rivalry. The conflict culminated in an argument during which both drew their guns. Liddil and Hite shot at each other repeatedly. Liddil was hit once in the leg, and Hite was hit in the arm. During the battle, Ford drew his gun and shot Hite once in the head. He died about 15 minutes later. Ford and his brother Charley Ford buried Hite in an unmarked grave.

In January 1882, Robert Ford and Liddil surrendered to Sheriff James Timberlake for Hite's murder, on the condition that they would receive pardons and a reward. Ford claimed that on January 12, 1882, he met with Missouri governor Thomas Crittenden who agreed to pardon Ford for the murder of Wood Hite if he would deliver Jesse James, dead or alive. Robert Ford shot Jesse James shortly after James saw a news report of Liddil's confession to the killing of Hite. Ford claimed that he believed James would turn on him after learning of the murder. After the death of James, Ford stood trial for Hite's murder and was found not guilty by a jury. In April 1901, Liddil was rearrested for the murder of Hite, but was later released, dying of heart failure three months later.

== Portrayal ==
In the 2007 movie The Assassination of Jesse James by the Coward Robert Ford, Hite was portrayed by Jeremy Renner. His death is portrayed as the result of a gun battle between Hite and Liddil in a bedroom after Hite appears to have been attempting to take them by surprise. When Liddil runs out of bullets, Hite points his gun at his head at point-blank range, only to be shot from behind by Ford.
