= The Great Missouri Raid =

1951 film by Gordon Douglas

- Theatrical release poster
- Directed by: Gordon Douglas
- Screenplay by: Frank Gruber
- Produced by: Nat Holt
- Starring: Wendell Corey; Macdonald Carey; Ellen Drew; Ward Bond; Bruce Bennett; Bill Williams; Anne Revere
- Cinematography: Ray Rennahan
- Edited by: Philip Martin
- Music by: Paul Sawtell
- Production company: Paramount Pictures
- Distributed by: Paramount Pictures
- Release date: January 16, 1951 (St. Louis)
- Running time: 84 minutes
- Country: United States
- Language: English

The Great Missouri Raid is a 1951 American Western film directed by Gordon Douglas, written by Frank Gruber, released by Paramount Pictures and starring Wendell Corey, Macdonald Carey, and Ward Bond.

== Plot ==
In Missouri during the final days of the American Civil War, brothers Frank and Jesse James engage in a skirmish with Union soldiers, killing one before fleeing. After the war's end, amnesty is declared, but the brothers are betrayed by Union officer Maj. Trowbridge, whose brother they had killed. Along with the Younger brothers, Frank and Jesse begin robbing banks, while Trowbridge, still seeking revenge, opens a detective agency to find and stop the brothers.

== Cast ==
- Wendell Corey as Frank James
- Macdonald Carey as Jesse James
- Ellen Drew as Bee Moore
- Ward Bond as Maj. Marshal Trowbridge
- Bruce Bennett as Cole Younger / Steve Brill
- Bill Williams as Jim Younger
- Anne Revere as Mrs. Samuels
- Edgar Buchanan as Dr. Samuels
- Lois Chartrand as Mary Bauer
- Louis Jean Heydt as Charles Ford
- Barry Kelley as Mr. Bauer
- James Millican as Sgt. Trowbridge
- Paul Lees as Bob Younger
- Guy Wilkerson as Clell Miller
- Ethan Laidlaw as Jim Cummings
- Tom Tyler as Allen Parmer
- Steve Pendleton as Arch Clements
- Robert Bray as Charlie Pitts
- Paul Fix as Sgt. Brill
- James Griffith as Jack Ladd
- Robert Osterloh as August
- Alan Wells as Dick Liddil
- Whit Bissell as Robert Ford

== Production ==
The railroad scenes were filmed on the Sierra Railroad in Tuolumne County, California.

== Release ==
The film premiered on consecutive nights in the cities of St. Louis, Kansas City, Wichita, St. Joseph and Topeka from January 16 to 20, 1951. The film's stars Ellen Drew and Ward Bond attended and St. Louis native Frank Faylen acted as the master of ceremonies.

== Reception ==
In a contemporary review for The New York Times, critic A. H. Weiler wrote:

At this point, this corner is willing to concede that Frank and Jesse James are among the most photographed characters of our folklore. And, the fact that another producer has seen fit to turn his cameras on the storied brothers should not come as news. But in 'The Great Missouri Raid,' the latest film view of those rampaging renegades ... the boys and their assistants are played by professionals, and they do their stuff in Technicolored surroundings which is more pleasant, if not more convincing, than black and white. What is a mite less than convincing is the sympathetic approach to an old legend. The James and Younger boys were forced into gangsterism, it says here, because they were hounded by Major Trowbridge, the Army man who later became a bank and railroad detective. Be that as it may—though it is hard to take—Frank Gruber's story and screen play give the outlaws decent lines to speak and loads of opportunities for hard riding, fast shooting and a modicum of romance for the Jameses."
