= Dick Liddil =

American outlaw (1852–1901)

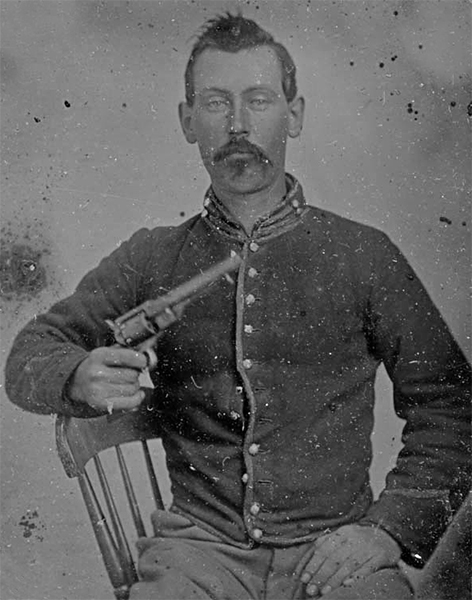
- Photograph of Dick Liddil holding a revolver
- Born: James Andrew Liddil; September 15, 1852; Jackson County, Missouri, United States
- Died: July 13, 1901 (aged 48); Latonia, Kentucky, United States
- Spouse: Mattie Collins

James Andrew "Dick" Liddil (September 15, 1852 – July 13, 1901) was an American outlaw who was one of the last surviving members of the James–Younger Gang. His surname is often misspelled as Liddel, Liddell, or Liddle.

== Early years ==
Liddil was born to James Milton Liddil and Elizabeth Forsby in Jackson County, Missouri in 1852. In the mid-1870s, Liddil was arrested for horse stealing in Vernon County, Missouri.

== James Gang ==
After being pardoned by the Governor of Missouri, Liddil was introduced to Jesse James in 1879. Liddil joined the James Gang that year and was later described by Frank James as a "good industrious young chap."

Liddil rode with the James Gang in October 1879 when they raided a depot in Glendale, 15 miles east of Kansas City. After capturing the telegraph operator, the gang signaled a train to stop, stealing the money from the safe in the express car. Liddil later said he received slightly over $1,000 for his part in the raid.

According to Liddil's later account, he became engaged to Mattie Collins the day after the Glendale raid. Liddil had met Collins in 1878 while she was on trial for murdering her employer. After Collins was acquitted on grounds of emotional insanity, Liddil introduced himself.

By some accounts, Liddil served as the lookout in September 1880 when the James Gang robbed the John Dovey Coal Mine payroll in Mercer County, Kentucky. Liddil reportedly had a love of horses and attended the horse races with Jesse James at Nashville's Blood Horse Race Course in October 1880.

Liddil was also part of the James Gang during its 1881 robberies of a paymaster delivering money to workers on the Muscle Shoals Canal project in Alabama, and a July 1881 robbery of the Chicago, Rock Island & Pacific Railroad at Winston, Missouri.

In November 1881, Liddil and Wood Hite, a first cousin of the James brothers, became engaged in a shootout outside Adairville, Kentucky, though neither man was shot. Liddil and Bob Ford killed Hite later that year, and Liddil was wounded in the fight. After killing Hite, Liddil hid, worrying that Jesse James would seek revenge for the death of his cousin. Liddil later recalled, "I mistrusted [him, and believed] Jesse wanted to kill me."

In January 1882, Liddil and Robert Ford surrendered to Sheriff James Timberlake at Martha Bolton's residence in Clay County, Missouri, reportedly out of fear of what Jesse James would do to him for killing Hite. Liddil told the law what he knew about the criminal activities of the James Gang, and his capture and confession were kept secret until March 1882.

Shortly after Liddil turned himself in, Jesse James was shot by Robert Ford in April 1882. That summer, Liddil was taken to Alabama where he stood trial for the Muscle Shoals robbery. He was found guilty but pardoned, as part of a deal requiring him to testify against Frank James. Despite Liddil's testimony, Frank James was acquitted, reportedly because the jury concluded that Liddil, who had turned on his associates, was not a reliable witness.

== Later years and death ==
Liddil co-owned the Bank Saloon with Bob Ford in Las Vegas, New Mexico during the mid-1880s, and later leased the saloon/billiard room at the Las Vegas Plaza Hotel.

In April 1891, Liddil was arrested for the murder of Wood Hite. The New York Times reported on the arrest as follows:

Dick Liddell, once a member of the famous James gang, now a wealthy horse owner on the Eastern tracks, was arrested and lodged in jail at Richmond yesterday. He is charged with the murder of Wood Hite, a cousin of Jesse James. The crime was committed in 1882 and was the outgrowth of a feud existing among several members of the gang. When the James gang was broken up, Liddell came East and raced horses at Brighton Beach, Clifton and Guttenberg.

Liddil returned to Missouri in the 1890s and became a regular on the Midwest racehorse circuit. Liddil worked as a horse trainer at Kentucky's Newport Park from 1896–1901. In 1901, the Cincinnati Post reported that Liddil owned several of the area's finest thoroughbreds and was one of the best-known horsemen in the West.

Liddil died of a heart attack while attending the Queen City Races at the race track in the Latonia neighborhood of Covington, Kentucky on July 13, 1901.

== Cultural references ==
Liddil has been a character in several motion pictures on the James-Younger Gang.

- Liddil was portrayed by Paul Schneider in the 2007 film The Assassination of Jesse James by the Coward Robert Ford.
- In the 1986 made-for-television film, The Last Days of Frank and Jesse James, Liddil was portrayed by Andy Stahl.
- In 1957's The True Story of Jesse James, the part of Liddil was played by Adam Marshall.
- In The Great Missouri Raid (1951), Liddil was portrayed by Alan Wells.
