= Edward Capehart O'Kelley =

American outlaw (1857–1904)

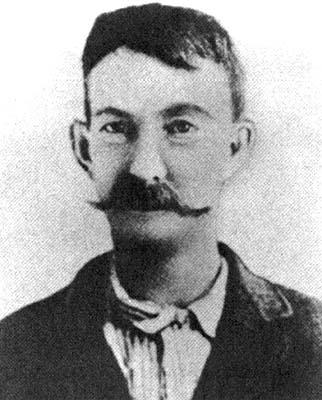
- Edward Capehart O'Kelley c. 1890
- Born: October 1, 1857; Harrisonville, Missouri, U.S. or Tennessee
- Died: January 13, 1904 (aged 46); Oklahoma City, Oklahoma Territory
- Cause of death: Gunshot wounds

Edward Capehart O'Kelley (October 1, 1857 or 1858 – January 13, 1904), alternately identified as Edmud O'Kelley, spelled mistakenly as O'Kelly or using the letter "O" as his middle initial, was an American deputy sheriff. He murdered Robert Ford, who had killed the famous outlaw Jesse James to receive a bounty. O'Kelley was the subject of a 1994 book by his great-great-niece.

== Early years ==
Little is known of O'Kelley's youth, although his birthplace is reported as Harrisonville, Missouri. Ed is also found in three census records, and is listed in each as being born in Tennessee. His mother was Margaret Ann Capehart (July 6, 1836 – July 27, 1903), but at the time of her July 14, 1857, marriage to Dr. Thomas Katlett O'Kelley (October 20, 1833 – October 9, 1923) she was already pregnant with Edward. It is believed that Thomas was not Edward's father.

Edward was a child during the American Civil War. In Thomas' Civil War Veteran Pension File, where Thomas was required to list all his children and their dates of birth, Edward is not included on the list. He lived in Scopus Township, Missouri according to the 1870 census.

He worked as a deputy sheriff in Pueblo, Colorado.

== Murder of Robert Ford ==
Robert Ford befriended outlaw Jesse James in 1882, when he and his brother Charley joined his gang. They lived with James and his family for a time. Ford shot James in the back of the head to collect a state bounty of $10,000. By 1892, he operated a tent saloon in the silver mining camp of Creede, Colorado.

On June 8, 1892, while Ford was preparing to open his saloon, O’Kelley walked into the tent with a shotgun. Ford was turned away from the front entrance. O'Kelley called out, "Hello, Bob." As Ford turned around to see who spoke, O’Kelley fired his shotgun, hitting Ford in the neck and killing him instantly.

O'Kelley never explained why he had shot Ford. According to one account, O'Kelley married a relative of the Younger Brothers Gang and became friends with Jesse James, who became a cousin by marriage. Another version contends that con man Soapy Smith assured O'Kelley he would be famous if he killed Ford. One theory involves the accusation that O'Kelley had stolen Ford's diamond ring, and the dispute had escalated. O'Kelley was initially imprisoned for life, though his sentence was later reduced to 18 years. In the end, O'Kelley served only around 9 years at the Colorado State Penitentiary before being released due, firstly, to a 7,000-signature petition in favor of his release, and, secondly, to a medical condition.

== After incarceration ==
After his release, O'Kelley moved to Oklahoma City. Shortly after his arrival in town, he was recognized by Otto Ewing of the Southern Club, a local gambling house. It is claimed that Ewing had been connected with Ford's saloon in Creede, and may even have been there when O'Kelley killed Ford. Ewing told people that O'Kelley was a dangerous man and best avoided.

In December 1903, police officer Joseph Grant "Joe" Burnett (1867–1917) arrested O'Kelley as a "suspicious character". O'Kelley was staying at the Lewis Hotel. He frequented the saloons on West 4th and 2nd Streets, which were known as the hangouts of criminals in the early years of the city.

== Personal life ==
Nicknamed "Red", O'Kelley reportedly married a relative of the Younger brothers.

== Death ==
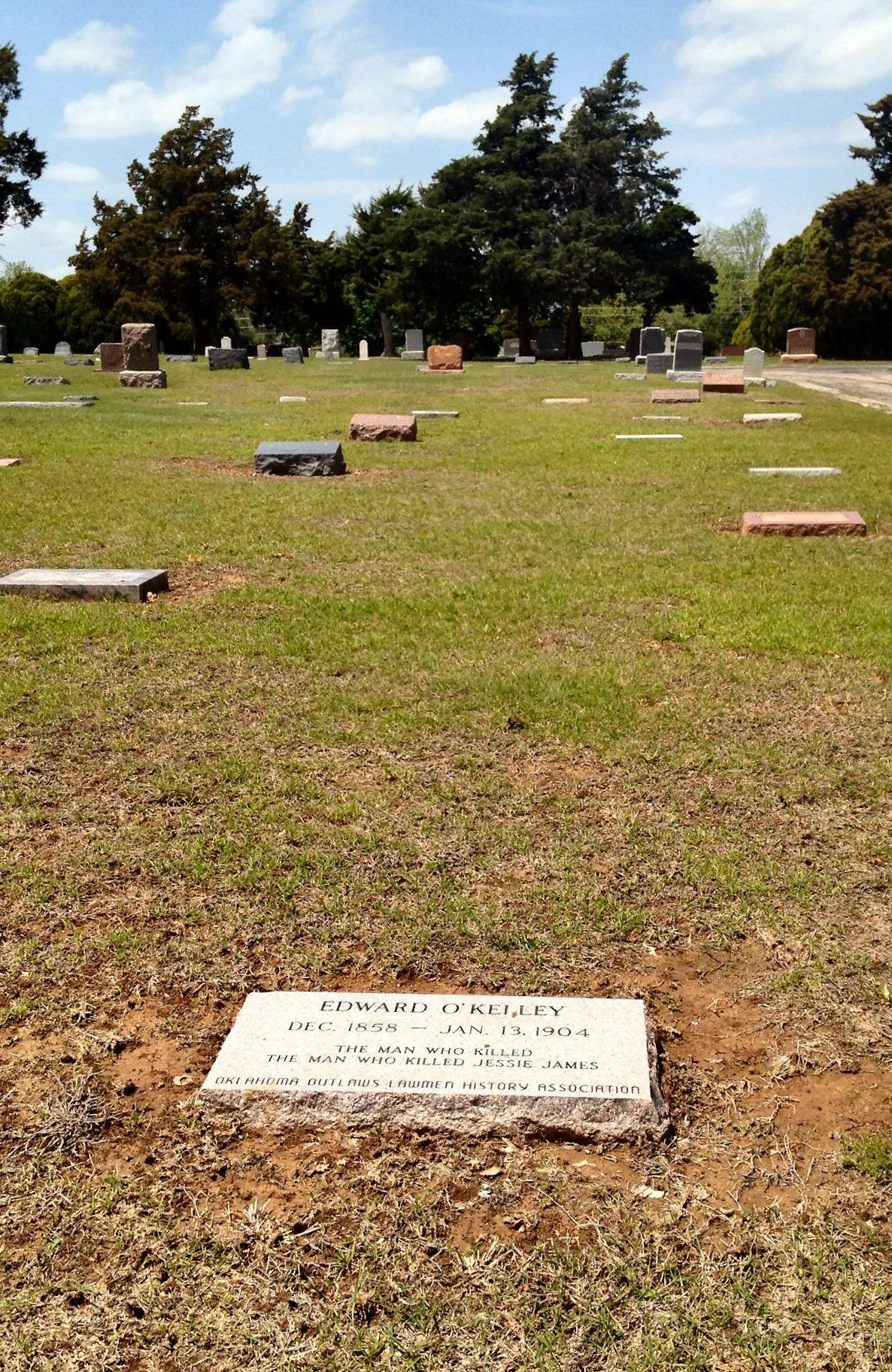
Edward O'Kelley's gravestone

On January 13, 1904, O'Kelley was arrested by a police officer named Bunker. O'Kelley was released and went to his hotel, where he commented to others that the police had better not try to arrest him again. That evening, Officer Burnett, who had arrested O'Kelley the previous month, was walking his beat on the south side of First Street, in front of the McCord & Collins building. Burnett encountered O'Kelley and greeted him politely. In reply, O'Kelley struck at the lawman and drew a revolver. As O'Kelley struck at the officer again, Burnett grabbed the gun with his left hand.

The two men began to wrestle over the firearm. O'Kelley fired his pistol several times in an attempt to kill Burnett. The officer called out for help repeatedly. O'Kelley did not hit Burnett with his gunfire, but Burnett did receive powder burns on one ear. Once out of ammunition, O'Kelley bit chunks out of both of Burnett’s ears.

A friend of O'Kelley came to his aid and fired one shot at the policeman, but then lost his nerve and ran away. R.E. Chapin witnessed the fight from the rear of the building on West Main Street and telephoned police headquarters. Finally, A.G. Paul, a railroad baggage man, came running from the depot. He grabbed O'Kelley's hand, thus freeing Burnett's gun hand. The policeman immediately fired two shots and killed O'Kelley.

There were two bullet holes in the back of Burnett's overcoat, and the left hip pocket was torn by a bullet. By the time friends reached his side, Burnett's gloves were burned and his clothing was on fire. They called an ambulance to take O'Kelley's body to the morgue at Street and Harpers furniture store. His body had a bullet wound in his left leg just above the knee. The fatal shot entered his head just behind the left temple and exited behind the right ear.

Burnett continued with the Oklahoma City Police Department, serving as a Captain and later as assistant Chief of Police. He died on July 20, 1917, of paralysis after a stroke, at St. Anthony's Hospital. Burnett was buried in a marked grave in the same cemetery as the man he killed.

== Memorial ==
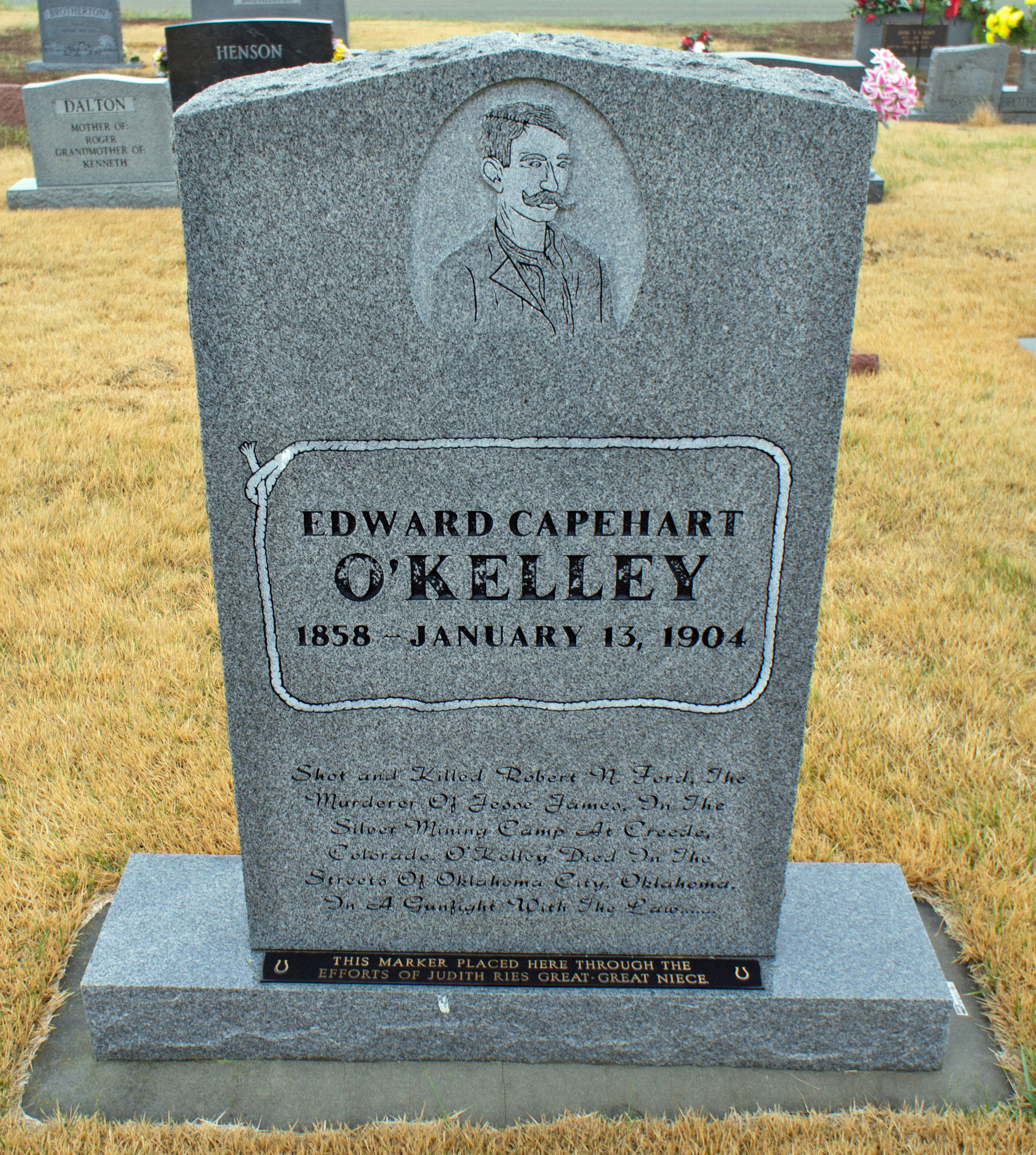
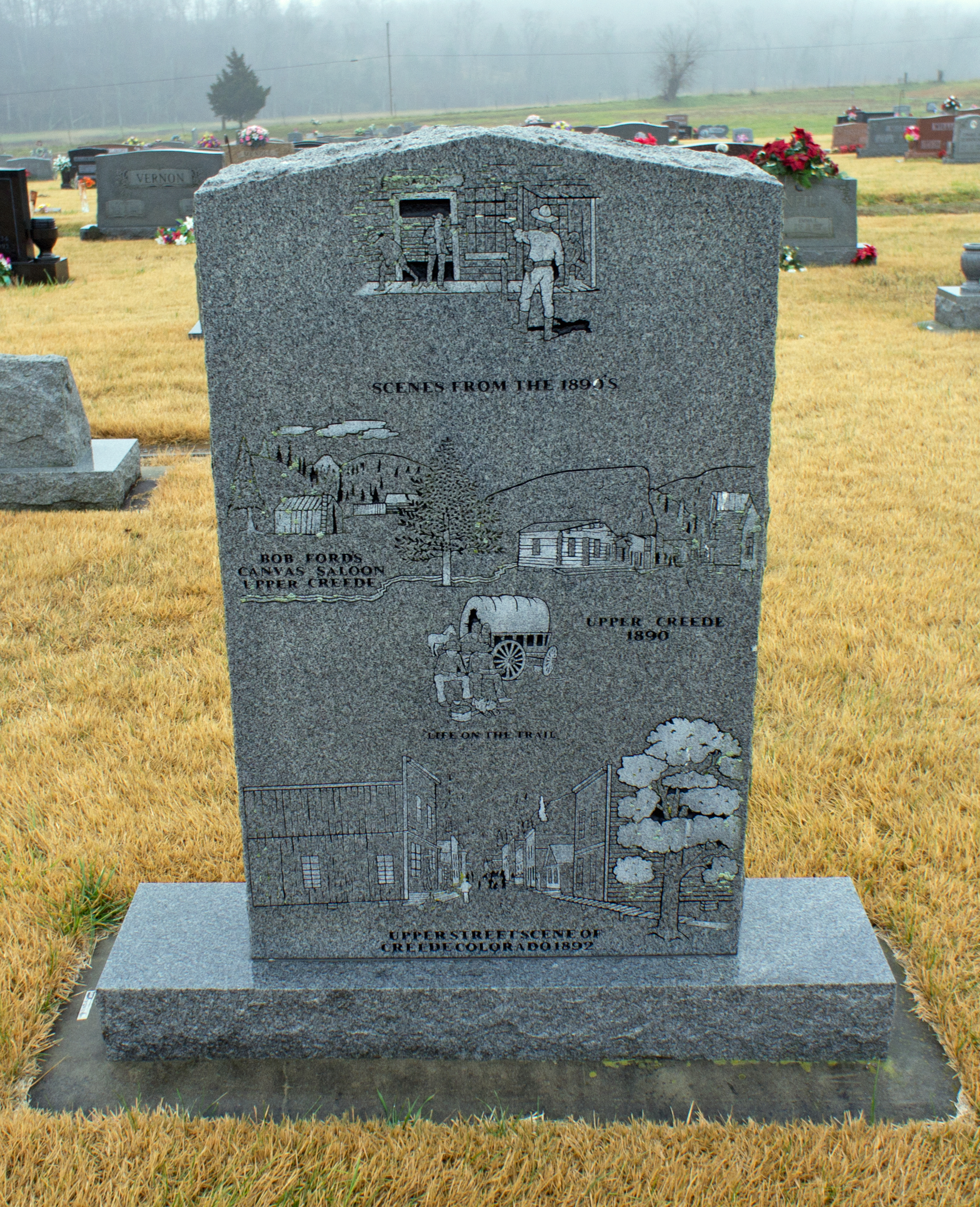
O'Kelley Memorial: front (left) and back views

A monument for Edward O'Kelley stands in the Patton United Methodist Church cemetery, on Country Road 878, in Patton, Bollinger, Missouri. The monument is engraved on both sides.

The front of the monument reads:

Edward Capehart O'Kelley
1858 - January 13, 1904

Shot and killed Robert N. Ford,
the murderer of Jesse James, in the
Silver mining camp at Creede,
Colorado. O'Kelley died in the
streets of Oklahoma City, Oklahoma
in a gunfight with the law.

The back of the memorial contains engraved scenes from 1890s Creede, Colorado, where O'Kelley fatally shot Ford. The monument was erected through the efforts of Judith Ries, O'Kelley's great-great niece.

== Sources ==
- Ries, Judith (1994). Ed O'Kelley: The Man Who Murdered Jesse James' Murderer. St. Louis, Mo.: Patches Publication. p. 119. ISBN 0-934426-61-9.
