= Charles Ford (outlaw) =

American outlaw

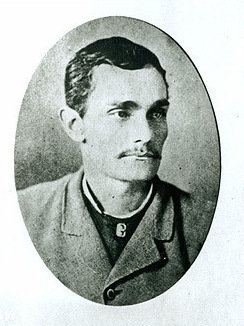
- Charley Ford prior to 1884
- Born: Charles Wilson Ford; July 9, 1857; Fauquier County, Virginia, U.S.
- Died: May 6, 1884 (aged 26); Richmond, Missouri, U.S.
- Burial place: Richmond Cemetery

Charles Wilson Ford (July 9, 1857 – May 6, 1884) was an American outlaw and a member of the James Gang. He was the lesser known older brother of Robert Ford, the killer of Jesse James. Charley Ford was introduced to Jesse and Frank James by Wood Hite and joined the gang in 1881 at the same time as his brother.

By the spring of 1882 Jesse James had moved with his family to a house in St. Joseph, Missouri, and invited the Fords to live there with him. He recruited Bob and Charley to help with a planned robbery of another bank in nearby Platte City, Missouri. Governor of Missouri Thomas T. Crittenden offered $10,000 for the capture of James, and the Fords secretly met with Crittenden to negotiate the reward. On April 3, 1882, Charley was present when Robert Ford shot and killed James in James' home. The Ford brothers were convicted and sentenced to be hanged, but were pardoned by Crittenden the same day.

Afterwards, the Fords capitalized on their notoriety by re-enacting James' murder on stage as part of a touring show. Charley heard a rumor that Frank James was searching for both with plans of mortal revenge. Two years later, after a period of deep depression following James' death, terminal illness from tuberculosis, and a debilitating morphine addiction, Charles Ford died by suicide on May 6, 1884.

== In popular culture ==
- Charles Tannen portrayed Charles Ford in Jesse James (1939) and The Return of Frank James (1940).
- Tommy Noonan portrayed Charles Ford in I Shot Jesse James (1949) and The Return of Jesse James (1950).
- Louis Jean Heydt portrayed Charles Ford in The Great Missouri Raid (1951).
- Paul Frees portrayed Charles Ford on the CBS radio show Crime Classics on July 20, 1953, in an episode entitled "The Death of a Picture Hanger".
- Frank Gorshin portrayed Charles Ford in The True Story of Jesse James (1957).
- Christopher Guest portrayed Charles Ford in The Long Riders (1980).
- Alexis Arquette portrayed Charles Ford in Frank & Jesse (1994).
- Sam Rockwell portrayed Charles Ford in The Assassination of Jesse James by the Coward Robert Ford (2007), based on the novel by Ron Hansen.
- Alex Rose portrayed Charles Ford in the Timeless episode "The Murder of Jesse James" (2017).

== See also ==
- Dick Liddil
