= Quantrill's Raiders =

Pro-Confederate partisan guerrillas in the American Civil War

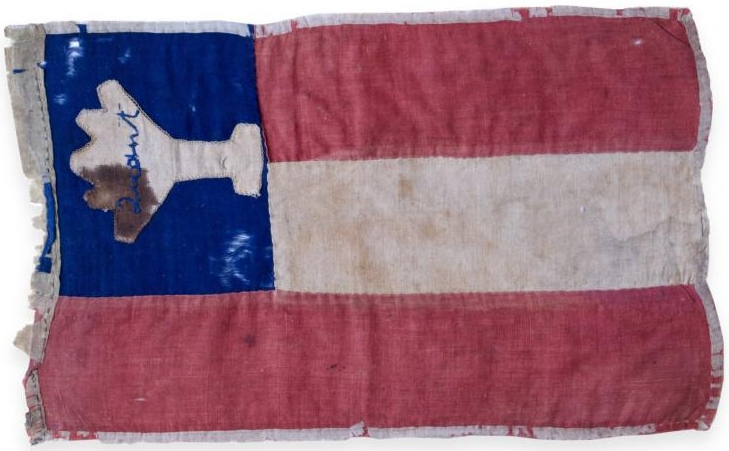
- William Clarke Quantrill's flag
- Active: 1861 – May 1865
- Allegiance: Confederate States
- Branch: Partisan Rangers
- Type: Partisan
- Role: Direct action Guerrilla warfare Raiding; Reconnaissance; Skirmisher
- Size: ~400 (1863)
- Engagements: American Civil War: First Battle of Independence; Lawrence Massacre; Battle of Baxter Springs

Commanders
- Notable commanders: Captain William Quantrill

Quantrill's Raiders were the best-known of the pro-Confederate partisan guerrillas (also known as "bushwhackers") who fought in the American Civil War. Their leader was William Quantrill and they included Jesse James and his brother Frank.

Early in the war Missouri and Kansas were nominally under Union government control and became subject to widespread violence as groups of Confederate bushwhackers and anti-slavery Jayhawkers competed for control. The town of Lawrence, Kansas, was a center of anti-slavery sentiment. In August 1863, Quantrill led an attack on the town, killing more than 180 civilians.

The Confederate government, which had granted Quantrill a field commission under the Partisan Ranger Act, was outraged and withdrew support for such irregular forces. By 1864 Quantrill had lost control of the group, which split up into small bands. Some, including Quantrill, were killed in various engagements. Others lived on to hold reunions many years later, when the name Quantrill's Raiders began to be used. The James brothers formed their own gang and conducted robberies for years as a continuing insurgency in the region.

== Origins ==
The Missouri-Kansas border area was fertile ground for the outbreak of guerrilla warfare when the Civil War erupted in 1861. The historian Albert Castel wrote:

For over six years, ever since Kansas was opened up as a territory by Stephen A. Douglas' Kansas-Nebraska Bill of 1854, its prairies had been the stage for an almost incessant series of political conventions, raids, massacres, pitched battles, and atrocities, all part of a fierce conflict between the Free State and pro-slavery forces that had come to Kansas to settle and to battle.

In February 1861, Missouri voters elected delegates to a statewide convention, which rejected secession by a vote of 89–1. Unionists, led by regular US Army commander Nathaniel Lyon and Frank Blair of the politically-powerful Blair family, fought for political and military control across the state against the increasingly pro-secessionist forces, led by Governor Claiborne Jackson and future Confederate General Sterling Price. By June, open warfare occurred between Union forces and troops supporting the Confederacy. Guerrilla warfare erupted throughout the state and intensified in August after the Union defeat at the Battle of Wilson's Creek.

One historical work describes the situation in the state after Wilson's Creek:

Unlike other border areas in Maryland and Kentucky, local conflicts, bushwhacking, sniping, and guerrilla fighting marked this period of Missouri history. "When regular troops were absent, the improvised war often assumed a deadly guerrilla nature as local citizens took up arms spontaneously against their neighbors. This was a war of stealth and raid without a front, without formal organization, and with almost no division between the civilian and the warrior."

By August 1862, with the Union victory at the Battle of Pea Ridge, Missouri was free of significant regular Confederate troops, but the insurgent violence continued. The most notorious guerrilla force was led by William Clarke Quantrill.

== Methods and legal status ==
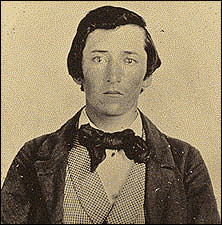
Early photo of Captain William Clarke Quantrill

Quantrill was not the only Confederate guerrilla operating in Missouri, but he rapidly gained the greatest notoriety. He and his men ambushed Union patrols and supply convoys, seized the mail, and occasionally struck towns on both sides of the Kansas-Missouri border. Reflecting the internecine nature of the guerrilla conflict in Missouri, Quantrill directed much of his effort against pro-Union civilians by attempting to drive them from the territory that he operated. Quantrill's guerrillas attacked Jayhawkers, Missouri State Militia, and Union troops and relied primarily on ambush and raids.

Under his direction, Confederate guerrillas perfected military tactics such as disguises, co-ordinated and synchronized attacks, planned dispersal after an attack that used preplanned routes and relays of horses, and technical methods such as the use of multiple .36-cal. Colt revolvers for increased firepower and their improved accuracy over the .44-cal.

=== Confederate induction ===
On 15 August 1862, Quantrill was granted a field commission as a captain in the Confederate army under the Confederate Partisan Ranger Act. Other officers were elected by the men, and Quantrill often referred to himself as a colonel. Despite the legal responsibility assumed by the Confederate government, Quantrill often acted on his own with little concern for his government's policy or orders. His most notable operation was the Lawrence massacre, a revenge raid on Lawrence, Kansas, in August 1863.

=== Lawrence massacre ===
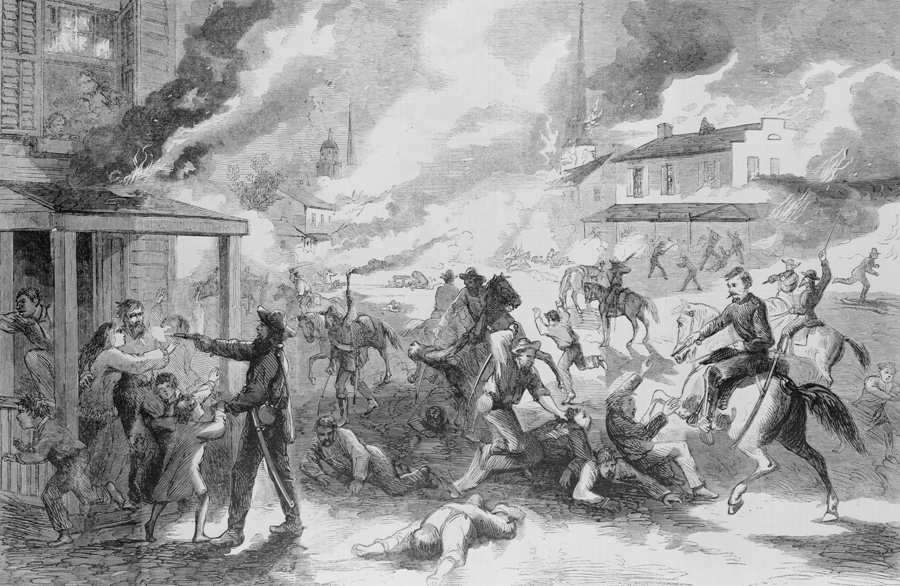
During Quantrill's raid, Quantrill and his men burned 185 buildings in Lawrence, KS and killed 182 men and boys.

Lawrence was the historic base of operations for abolitionist and Jayhawker organizations. Pro-slavery forces also operated in the area, as both sides tried to gain power to determine whether Kansas would allow slavery. During the period of border warfare (1855–1861), the region became known as "Bleeding Kansas" in the press. During the Civil War, Jayhawkers continued their raids into western Missouri, where slavery was concentrated in the area known as Little Dixie along the Missouri River. Robberies, theft, arson, and murders of citizens were committed by both sides.

In August 1863, Union authorities assigned to the so-called District of the Border were frustrated by the hit-and-run tactics of Quantrill's guerrillas, particularly the aid provided by Confederate sympathizers in western Missouri border counties. Authorities began imprisoning the female members of the known guerrillas' families, with the intent of banishing them. The females, some teenagers, were jailed in Kansas City, Missouri, in makeshift jails, including the house on Grand Street in which local artist George Caleb Bingham kept his studio. The Union soldiers enlarged the space on the first floor by removing supporting beams. As a result, the structure collapsed, maiming and killing several women. The deaths of the women outraged the pro-Southern guerrillas, as they were close, familial, relations to Quantrill and his men.

Calling for revenge, Quantrill organized a unified partisan raid on Lawrence although there is evidence that the raid had been planned before the collapse. Co-ordinating across vast distances, small bands of partisans rode across 50 miles (80 km) of open prairie to rendezvous on Mount Oread in the early morning hours before the raid. Quantrill's men burned a quarter of the town's buildings and killed at least 150 men and boys. One of the main targets of the raid, abolitionist U.S. Sen. Jim Lane, escaped by fleeing into corn fields. The Lawrence raid was the most deadly and infamous operation of Missouri's Confederate guerrillas.

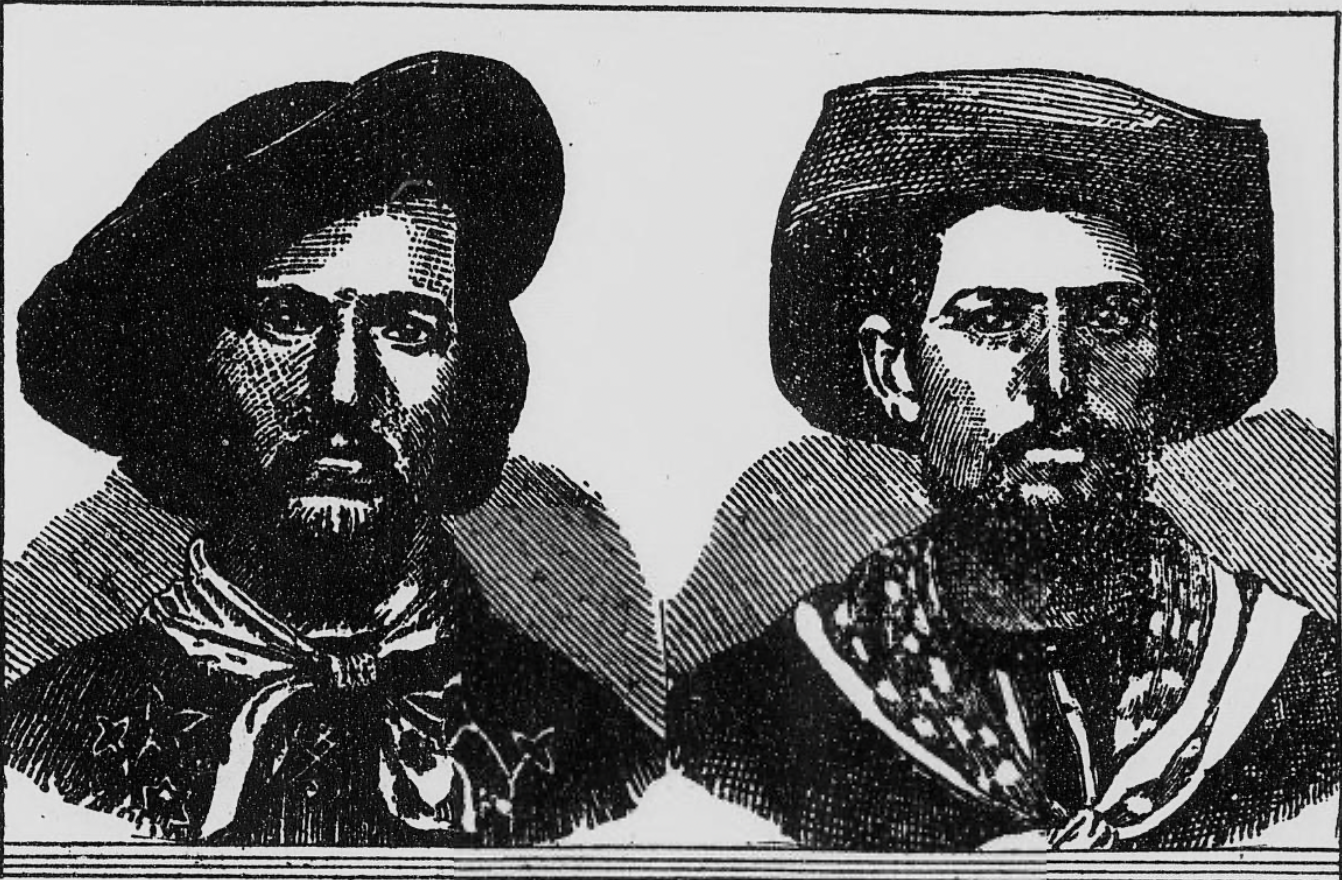
Wood Hill and Tuck Hill

=== Confederate reaction ===
The Confederate leadership was appalled by the raid and withdrew even tacit support from the "bushwhackers." After the raid, Quantrill led his men behind Confederate lines down to Sherman, Texas, where they wintered in 1863–1864. Along the way, they attacked Fort Baxter (Kansas), and ambushed and killed near 100 Union troops in the Battle of Baxter Springs. In Texas, they continued to embarrass the Confederate command by their often-lawless actions.

In Texas in 1864, two of Quantrill's Raiders, the Calhoun Brothers, were killed in a gunfight with Collin County Sheriff Captain James L. Read. Read was able to escape Quantrill's rage after he went into hiding but was lynched by Quantrill's supporters in Tyler, Texas on May 18, 1864.

Some Confederate officers appreciated the effectiveness of these irregulars against Union forces, which rarely gained the upper hand over them, especially Quantrill. Among them was General Joseph O. Shelby, who rode south into Mexico with his troops, rather than surrender at the end of the war. His command was remembered as "The Undefeated."

=== John Noland ===
Among Quantrill's men was an enslaved man, John Noland. John was owned by Francis Asbury Noland. There is no evidence that John was given his freedom before or during war.

In the 1999 film Ride with the Devil, which depicts a group of fictionalized Missouri bushwhackers, the character Daniel Holt was inspired by Noland.

== Dissolution and aftermath ==
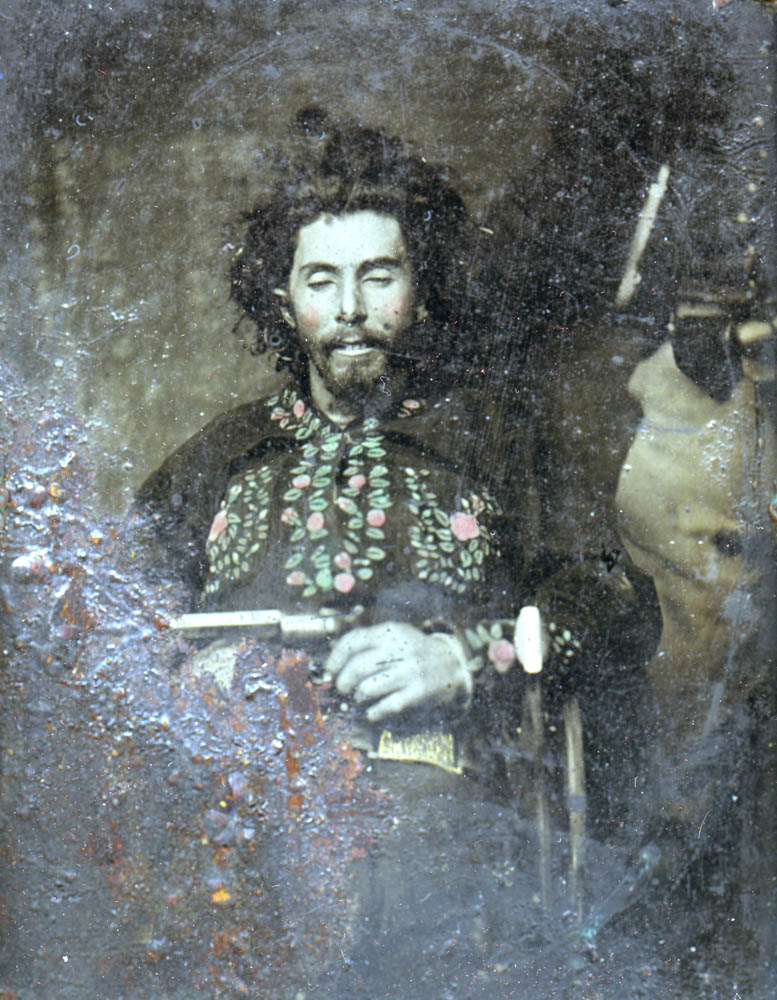
Anderson's body several hours after he died October 26, 1864

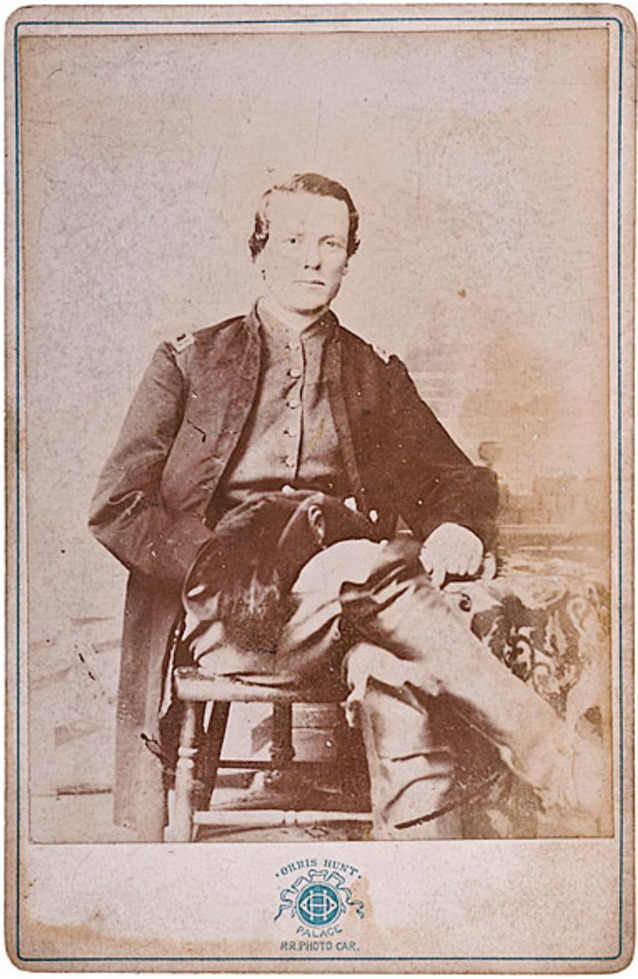
George Todd

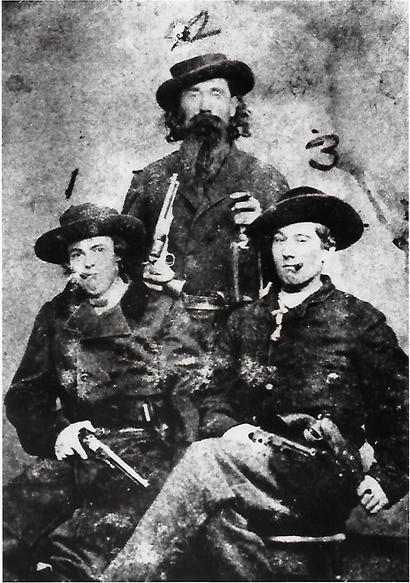
From left to right: Arch Clements, Dave Pool, and Bill Hendricks brandishing revolvers in Sherman, Texas, 1863

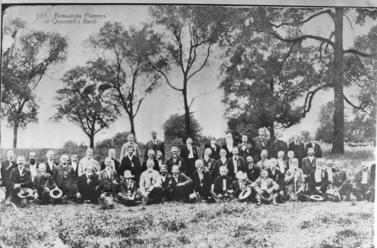
Reunion of Quantrill's Raiders. The first official reunion occurred in 1898, more than 30 years after Quantrill's death and the end of the Civil War.

In late winter 1863, Quantrill lost his hold over his men. In early 1864, the guerrillas returned from Texas to Missouri in separate bands, none being led by Quantrill.

=== Deaths ===
Quantrill's guerrillas, as a group, did not maintain operations in winters along the border. Quantrill took his men to Cedar Mills, Texas, over winter and offered his services to the Confederacy. Their assignments included attacking teamsters who supplied the Union, repelling Union and Jayhawker raids into northern Texas, warding off Indian attacks, and policing and rounding up deserters roaming in Texas and Oklahoma. The guerrillas were rowdy, undisciplined, and dangerous. Quantrill lost his control of the men in the winter of 1863–1864.

The men split into bands and were commanded by Lieutenants "Bloody Bill" Anderson and George M. Todd. The guerrillas returned to Missouri in early 1864, and Quantrill took several of his loyal troops east, towards Kentucky. In Kentucky, pro-Union soldiers and hired killers tracked Quantrill and his men. They were cornered in a barn, where a shootout resulted in Quantrill being injured in the spine and left unable to move. He was arrested, but he reportedly died a week later from his wounds.

Anderson's splinter group of guerrillas was assigned to duty in 1864 north of the Missouri River, during the General Sterling Price raid. He was to disrupt Union operations north of the Missouri River and draw Union troops toward his cavalry command. Anderson was reportedly shot dead north of Orrick. His body was dragged through the streets of Richmond, Missouri. His gravemarker is in the old Mormon Pioneer cemetery, in the extreme southwest corner, behind some pine trees and near the road.

Todd's splinter group was attached to Major General Sterling Price's raid south of the Missouri River. He functioned as a cavalry scout. Todd died after being shot out of his saddle by a Union sniper, north of Independence, Missouri, a day before the Battle of Westport. Captain William H. "Bill" "Stuart" [Stewart] of Quantrill's Raiders was shot and killed November 1864 in Howard County Missouri as he tried to rob a Union cattle drover. Some of the guerrillas continued under the leadership of Archie Clement. He kept a group together after the war and harassed the Missouri state government during 1866. In December 1866, state militiamen killed Clement in Lexington. Several of his men continued as outlaws, emerging in time as the James-Younger Gang. The last survivor of Quantrill's Raiders died in 1940.

== In popular culture ==
- Jesse James Under the Black Flag (1921), a silent film features Quantrill and Jesse James
- The film Dark Command (1940) deals with the fictional William Cantrell's Raiders, also led by a partisan made an officer by the Confederacy.
- Fighting Man of the Plains is a 1949 American film directed by Edward L. Marin. Randolph Scott plays Jim Dancer, one of Quantrill's Raiders staging attacks on Kansas on behalf of the fallen Confederacy in the years following the Civil War.
- The Audie Murphy film Kansas Raiders (1950) deals with Quantrill's Raiders in the period immediately after the Civil War, as does Arizona Raiders, also starring Audie Murphy.
- The film Best of the Badmen (1951) is a fictional account of the remnants of Quantrill's Raiders in the western frontier after they had surrendered to Union forces.
- The film Red Mountain (1951) has a "General" William Quantrill stirring up rebellion in various Indian Nations in 1865.
- Anthony Mann's film Bend of the River (1952) features James Stewart as Glyn McLyntock, a Missouri-Kansas border raider trying to escape his past and make good by accompanying a wagon train of settlers to Oregon.
- The film The Stranger Wore a Gun (1953) has Randolph Scott playing Jeff Travis, a former spy for Quantrill's Raiders, who rides to Arizona to start a new life, but finds that his reputation has preceded him.
- Season 1, episode 20 of Gunsmoke titled "Reunion '78" (1956) shows a survivor of a Quantrill raid ten year earlier seeking revenge on a raider.
- The Lone Ranger episode "The Twisted Track" (1956) is about a member of Quantrill's Raiders (William Henry) seeking revenge against a Union officer.
- Though historically inaccurate, Allied Artists Pictures made a B-Western entitled Quantrill’s Raiders (1958), starring Steve Cochran as a fictionalized hero and with Leo Gordon as the title character.
- In the film Bandolero! (1968), Mace Bishop (James Stewart) compares his riding with Union General Sherman to his brother Dee Bishop's (Dean Martin) riding with Quantrill as "war versus meanness".
- In the films True Grit, protagonist Rooster Cogburn (John Wayne in the original 1969 version and Jeff Bridges in the 2010 version) prides himself for having been part of Quantrill's Raiders during the Civil War. He has a cat named General Sterling Price after the notable Confederate general from Missouri.
- The main character of the film The Outlaw Josey Wales (1976) joins Bloody Bill Anderson's unit after his family is murdered by Jayhawkers.
- Season 4 episode 8 of Little House on the Prairie called "The Aftermath" (1977) was about Jesse James and his brother Frank who holed up in Walnut Grove and references Quantrill's Raiders throughout.
- In the 1978 movie Goin' South, Jack Nicholson plays Henry Lloyd Moon, a former member of Quantrill's Raiders.
- Enemy Gold, a 1993 B movie from Andy Sidaris, uses the myth of Quantrill's Gold as fuel for the storyline—though the historical connections are thin at best.
- The DC Comics series The Kents (1997) has the protagonist's brother and an ancestor of Superman, Jeb Kent, as a member of the Quantrill's Raiders.
- Ride with the Devil (1999), starring Tobey Maguire, depicts Quantrill's Raiders and the Missouri-Kansas conflict.
- The movie The Hateful Eight (2015) makes references to the Mannix Marauders, a fictionalized version of Quantrill's Raiders.
- In the video game Red Dead Redemption 2 (2018), the town of Lawrence is mentioned in a letter found on a Lemoyne Raider, the in-game version of Quantrill's Raiders. In said letter, fights with the Jayhawkers are said to be going on, possibly referring to the massacre in the town.
- The 36th album of the American Civil War-themed Belgian comic Les Tuniques Bleues is entitled Quantrill and concerns the main (Union Army) characters' encounter with Quantrill and his Raiders.

=== Literary fiction and music ===
- In the song "Frank and Jesse James" on his 1976 eponymous album, Warren Zevon sings about young Frank and Jesse James when "they joined up with Quantrill" just after "war broke out between the states".
- Quantrill's Raiders are a major element in Wildwood Boys (William Morrow, New York; 2000), a biographical novel of "Bloody Bill" Anderson by James Carlos Blake.

== See also ==
- List of Missouri Confederate Civil War units
