= George M. Todd =

Confederate soldier (1839-1864)

George M Todd
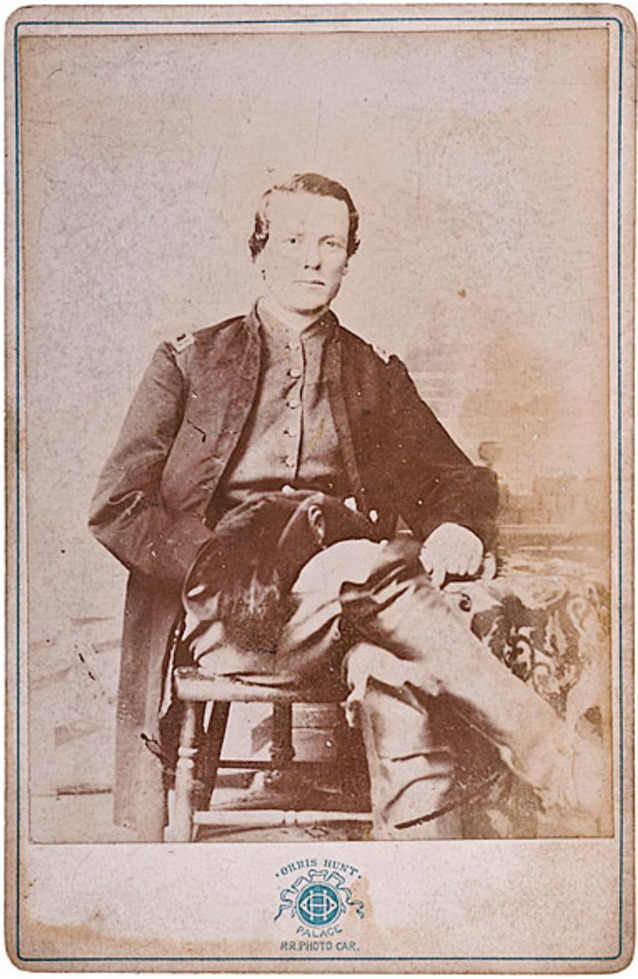
- Born: 17 September 1839; Province of Canada
- Died: 21 October 1864 (aged 25); Jackson County, Missouri, United States
- Resting place: Woodlawn Cemetery, Independence, Missouri, United States
- Occupation: Stonemason
- Spouse: Hannah Catherine Moore (m. 1861; died 1864)
- Children: 0
- Parents: George Todd (father); Margerit Todd (mother)
- Military career
- Allegiance: Confederate States of America
- Service years: 1862-64
- Conflicts: American Civil War: First Battle of Independence; Lawrence Massacre; Battle of Little Blue River †

George M. Todd (September 17, 1839 – October 21, 1864) was a Canadian American Confederate guerrilla leader during the American Civil War who served under William C. Quantrill. A participant in numerous raids, including the Lawrence Massacre in 1863, he was ultimately killed at the Battle of Little Blue River in 1864.

== Early life ==
George was the 5th of seven children, four of whom died in childhood. The family moved from Montréal to Chateaugay, New York, around 1849 or 1850. The next census where their names appear are in the 1860 Kansas City census, where he is listed as residing with his parents, George & Margerit, and his younger sister, also Margerit. His older brother Tom was, like their father, a stonemason. During the construction of a sewer, Tom was struck and killed by a stone which rolled down the embankment to the bottom of the ravine.

Contemporaneous reports noted George as being "of a sullen, morose disposition, having little to say to anyone, and with no close associates, but without vicious habits".

One would think from his origin he would have been an enemy of slavery, but the eccentricities of the human family are many and varied and past explaining. At one time it was reported that he was at the family residence in this city, whereupon a half dozen young men, including myself, banded together to capture him. Accordingly, we went to the house about ten o'clock PM, all well armed, and were met at the door by his mother. We informed her we came to see George and she at once denounced us in a volume of vitriolic vituperation, declaring, "You wretches want to spill the best blood of Scotland, the noblest blood of Scotland!"; but unheedful of her scolding, we proceeded to search the house, and not finding him, we descended into cellar carrying lighted candles, but he was not there. I have since thought it fortunate that for the members of that expedition that Todd was absent, otherwise some blood would have been shed and it might not have been the best blood of Scotland. Todd became one of the most savage and bloodthirsty of Quantrill's followers, and was killed on October 22, 1864, the day of the battle of the Big Blue. Tom Todd had married in St Louis before 1859, as I now remember, an estimable young woman. At the time of his fatal injury, he asked his brother George to take good care of her and see that she was protected. Soon after George went with the guerillas, he married her. After his death, she again remarried and moved to California, where she still lives. Morgan T Maddox, one of Quantrill's men, gave me this information from which I wrote my account of the death of George Todd, printed in my 'Quantrill & the Border Wars,' pg 455. On the 24th of March, 1910, Maddox again repeated this story to me, and added that when he went up to Todd, he was still quivering in death, and that a volley was fired at him and one other man while they were dragging Todd down into the slough.

— George W. Martin, 1910

Todd was documented as marrying Miss Hannah Catherine Moore 12/1861 but no documented issue was noted from the union. Todd married and left directly to join Quantrill. Ms Moore remarried a J W Waller in 1868 and moved to Sacramento, California, after the war.

Mr Martin's description is interesting but flawed with his own disinformation. He cited Todd as having no "vicious habits" but somehow warrants late night visits with armed militia to extract him and being relieved not to have met with him and later describes him as "savage" and "bloodthirsty." It's apparent Mr Martin was more familiar with George (the father) and Tom rather than Todd himself. Likewise, it was noted Todd joined the guerillas because he had gotten into some kind of "trouble" in Independence, MO at one point. Also, another stimulus for taking to the "bresh" was a noted incident with his father. In Petersen's book, Quantrill at Lawrence, he writes: "At the beginning of the war, the Todds were building bridges and structures around Kansas City. When the war started, the Federals asked George's father to help build army fortifications around the border. When he refused he was thrown in prison and put on a diet of bread and water. The cold dampness of the prison disabled the elder Todd, and he became unable to care for himself. Neighbors had to come to the cell to help feed him. George had already joined Col. William Roper's regiment in the Missouri State Guards and when he returned home he was thrown in jail. After his release and seeing the treatment his father was given by the Federals he joined Quantrill in 1862, eventually becoming Quantrill's second in command. It was this incarceration of his father that turned him against the Union authority. An acquaintance remarked that he possessed a large amount of personal courage due to his early association in Price's army."

== Physical description and personality ==
Todd was described in one source as standing roughly 5′8″ but most sources state he was 6′. Quantrill was noted at 5′8″ and in his portrait with Todd, Todd stands taller than him. He was documented as auburn haired or blondish, with blue eyes and a fair complexion. He was documented in one place to have a lispy voice (unsourced). Detractors call him "barely literate," while other sources note he had basic literacy and played the piano some. Another guerilla noted he would be seen reading books on military history and enjoyed talking about military manoeuvres and tactics but was otherwise reserved and quiet. Kate King noted he was a very kind person, on average, one of her "best friends" and used to give her candy. KC neighbor, Marietta Allen, noted both George and his family were kind and generous people, on the whole. An acquaintance remarked that he possessed a large amount of personal courage due to his early association in Price's army. It was said that he bore the mark of several different wounds on his body.

== Biography ==
Todd had worked as a bridge mason before the war, and served with the Missouri State Guard before joining Quantrill in 1862. He rose to become one of Quantrill's principal lieutenants, and participated in various raids of his own as well as with Quantrill. During the First Battle of Independence on August 11, 1862, Todd served under Quantrill in a two-pronged attack on the city led by Col. John T. Hughes. During the fighting, Todd liberated several prisoners in the city jail, one of whom was the city marshal, James Knowles, who had been imprisoned for the killing of a rowdy citizen. Knowles and a Union captain named Thomas (whom Todd had captured at this same time) were summarily executed by Todd and his men, who wanted revenge for previous attacks made by those two on their command.

On August 21, 1863, Todd participated in Quantrill's raid on Lawrence, in which 150 men and boys were massacred

Todd and his men did not participate in the Centralia Massacre, on September 27, 1864. Primarily known for the massacre of unarmed union soldiers on a train (this was performed by William T. Anderson and not endorsed by Todd, who reprimanded Anderson for the deed), the guerrillas overran a relief force of inexperienced mounted infantry carrying single shot rifles, killing nearly all of them as well.

Todd was killed during the Battle of Little Blue River, on October 21, 1864, possibly by Lt. Col. George H. Hoyt of the Fifteenth Kansas, although an eyewitness believed that the fatal shot was probably fired by a nearby private. According to Edwards, "a Spencer rifle ball entered his neck in front, passed through and out near the spine, and paralyzed him. Dying as he fell, he was yet tenderly taken up and carried to the house of Mrs. Burns, in Independence. Articulating with great difficulty and leaving now and then almost incoherent messages to favorite comrade or friend, he lingered for two hours insensible to pain, and died at last as a Roman." Todd was buried at Woodlawn Cemetery in Independence, where his grave is a local historical attraction.

== Gallery ==
Purported images of George Todd

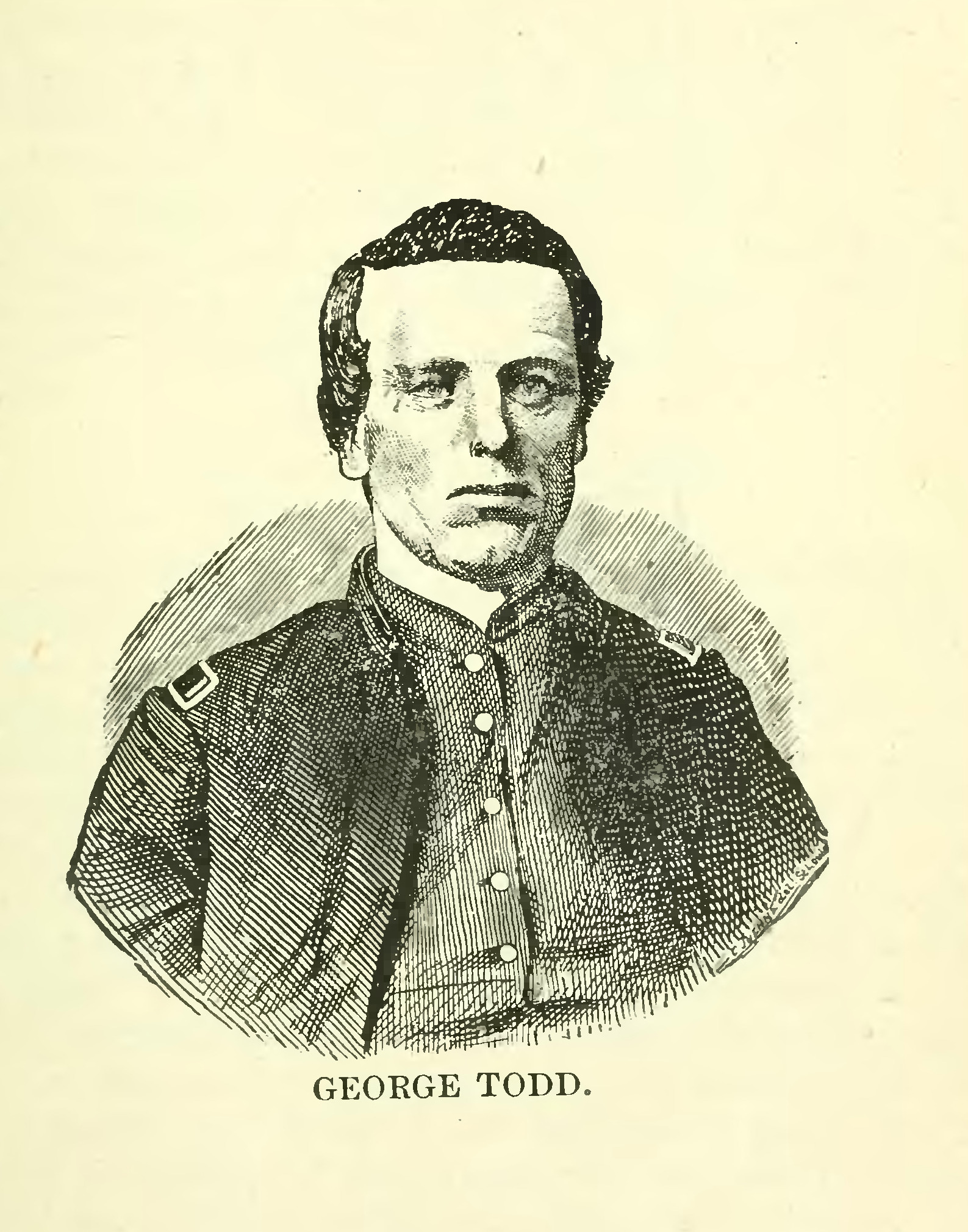

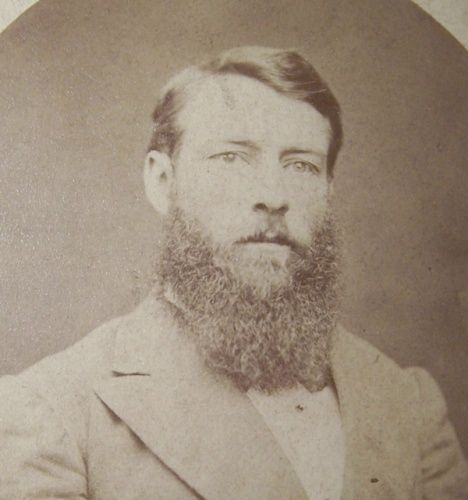

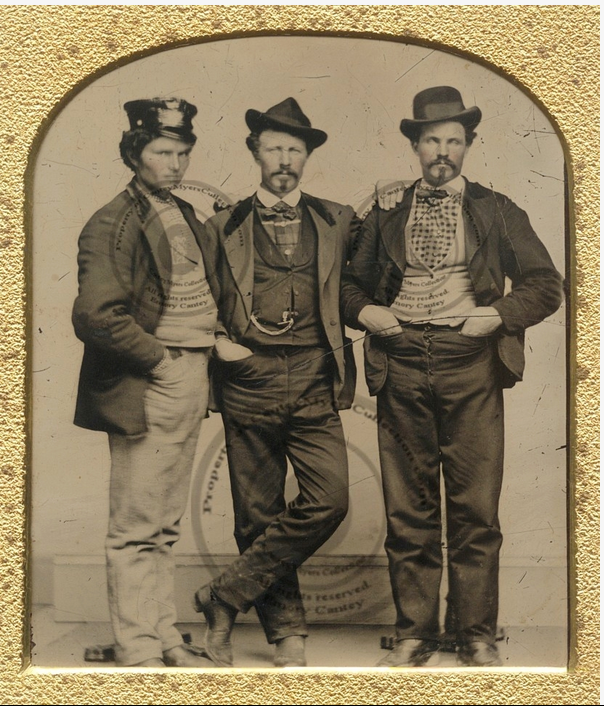

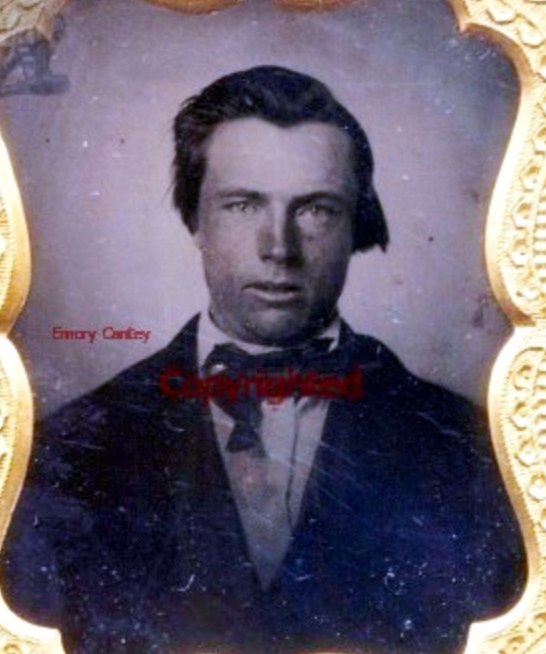

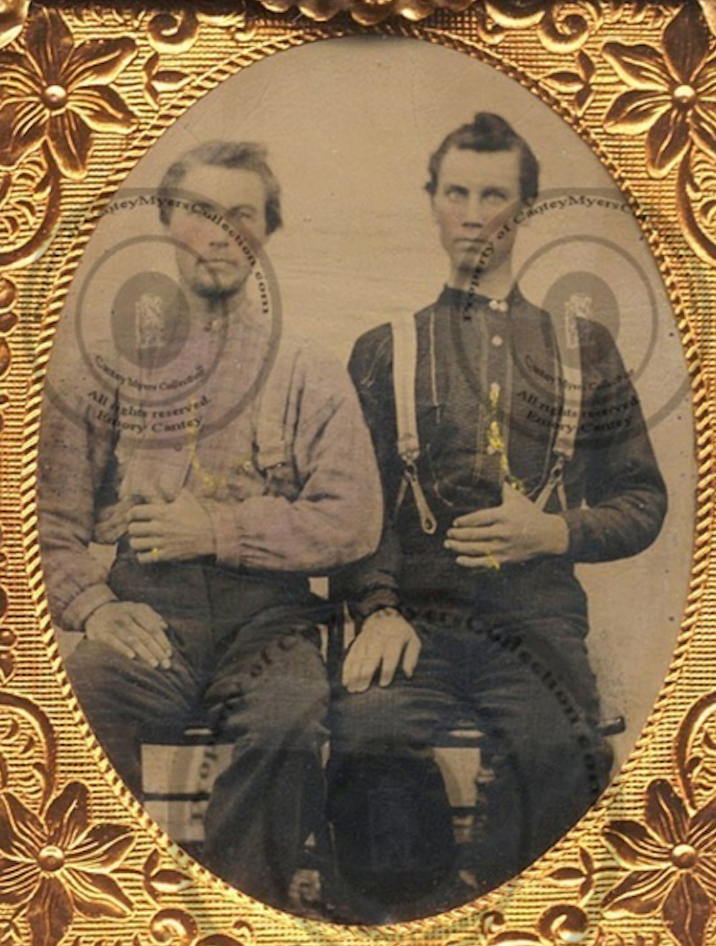

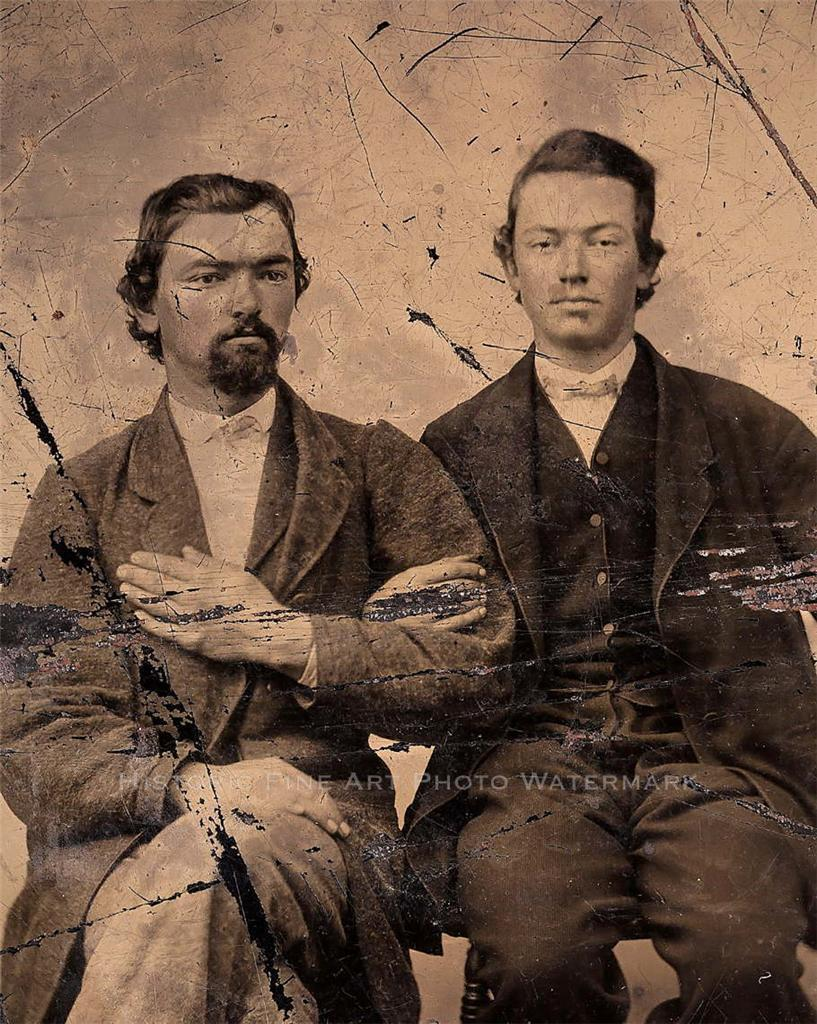

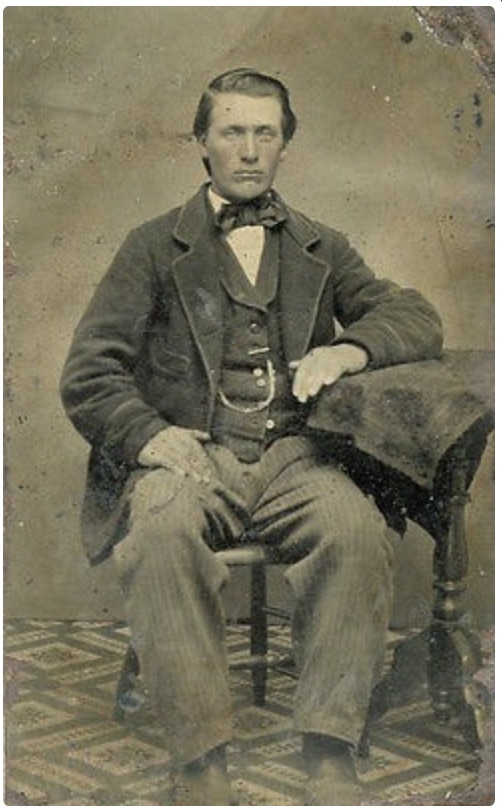

== See also ==
- History of guerrilla warfare
- Guerrilla warfare in the American Civil War

== Sources ==
- Lause, Mark A. (2016). The Collapse of Price's Raid: The Beginning of the End in Civil War Missouri. Columbia, Missouri: University of Missouri Press. ISBN 978-0-826-22025-7.
