= John Noland =

Slave during the American Civil War

John Noland (c. 1844 – June 25, 1908) was a slave and the personal servant of bushwhacker William C. Quantrill during the American Civil War. Noland was a chattel slave owned by Francis Asbury Noland in Jackson County, Missouri.

In 1863, Lincoln signed the Emancipation Proclamation which did not apply to border states like Missouri. Slavery was still legal there and in Kansas, where many of Quantrill's actions occurred. There is no conclusive evidence Asbury Noland freed Noland. By comparison, there is no evidence that Noland was still enslaved during his service to the Confederacy. That same year, Noland helped with scouting Lawrence, Kansas, before the massacre by Quantrill's men which killed over 143 people.

== Life with the Quantrill Raiders ==
According to one historian, several white men in Quantrill's guerrilla group shared Noland's last name and might have been familial relations. In this time period, it was not unusual for slaveholders to send a servant to camp to perform menial tasks or to “hire out” slaves. It is unknown how John Noland became William Quantrill's servant and hostler.

In a 1904 letter from William H. Gregg to William E. Connolley, Gregg wrote that he “cornered” John Noland about his role in the Lawrence raid. Noland confirmed that Asbury Noland was his one-time owner. He did not want to cause trouble by talking about the incident but admitted he was sent to Lawrence to spy. He maintained that he had not met up with Quantrill before the raid.

In his memoir, Andrew Walker described Noland as a "brave, resourceful fellow." Walker was also clear on another claim, "no negro ever fought with us as a regular member of the band". Walker explained that Noland was not a fighter but "John would have done so" had Quantrill allowed it.

== Reunion attendance & death ==
Post-war pictures show Noland, an African-American, sitting with his comrades at reunions of the Raiders. Noland tried to attend most of the reunions and was popular among other Quantrill veterans, who described him as "a man among men."

A newspaper article covering the 1905 reunion and his obituary emphasize Noland's devotion to Quantrill as a personal servant. John Noland died at the Kansas City Poor Farm at 64 years old. When Noland died, he had all white pallbearers at his funeral.

== In popular culture ==
In the 1999 film Ride with the Devil, depicting a group of fictionalized Missouri bushwhackers similar to those of Quantrill's Raiders, the character of Daniel Holt was representative of Quantrill's John Noland. The film depicted him, including his discomfort with his fellow bushwhackers' racism. The film also shows the fictional Holt participating in Quantrill's raid on Lawrence, Kansas.

Ride with the Devil received criticism from two historians for blurring the lives of John Noland and the fictional Daniel Holt. They claimed that some fans have also confused the motivations expressed by Holt in the film with the real John Noland. Contrary to the film, John Noland was not free. He revealed his enslaved status during the war. Francis Asbury Noland was not gunned down by Jayhawkers, and he lived until 1867.

== See also ==
- Independence, Missouri
