= Fort Blair =

Fort Blair can refer to:

- A 1774 precursor to Fort Randolph (1776), Point Pleasant, West Virginia, USA
- Fort Blair, Kansas; site of the Battle of Baxter Springs
