= Centralia Massacre =

Centralia Massacre may refer to:

- Centralia Massacre (Missouri), during the American Civil War in 1864
- Centralia Tragedy, an incident of labor unrest in Washington State in 1919
