= Lawrence blockhouses =

- Lawrence, Kansas

Site information
- Type: local militia blockhouses
- Controlled by: Lawrence militia

Site history
- Built: 1864
- In use: May 1864 - about April 1865
- Materials: wood

Garrison information
- Garrison: same

The Lawrence blockhouses were a series of blockhouses built in the spring of 1864 in Lawrence, Kansas, to provide defensive structures in case of attack by Confederate guerrillas. On August 21, 1863, Lawrence had been attacked by 400 guerrillas and Confederate Army recruits under the command of William C. Quantrill. Lawrence was caught virtually defenseless and much of the town was destroyed and about 180 men and boys were killed, most of them defenseless. A militia became active by spring 1864 to prevent another attack.

Five blockhouses were completed by May 1864. One militia company was assigned to man each blockhouse. Each blockhouse was constructed of logs and had port holes to be used to aim rifles outside in the event Lawrence was attacked. It is unknown where all the blockhouses were located. One was somewhere in west Lawrence and two may have been on the outskirts of town. One was at the intersection of Massachusetts and Winthrop streets and another was at the intersection of Massachusetts and Berkley streets.

The geographical coordinates are known for only two of the blockhouses. These are:

- Blockhouse at Massachusetts and Winthrop (today 7th Street) -
- Blockhouse at Massachusetts and Berkley (today 10th Street) -

Both Cordley and Ridenour said some members of the militia were assigned to man each blockhouse every night. In late October 1864 communities in Kansas became concerned when Confederate Maj. Gen. Sterling Price, who had begun a raid through Missouri in September, neared Kansas City from the east. On October 22 three of the five Lawrence militia units were sent to the front, leaving the other two to man the blockhouses and, along with some soldiers from the nearby Army post, guarded Lawrence.

The residents of Lawrence on October 23 got reports that the Union forces confronting Price had been beaten and that nothing stood between Lawrence and advancing Confederates. However, the next morning it was learned Price's men had been badly beaten and were retreating south. The two militia companies continued to man the blockhouses for about two weeks, as the other three companies were occupied in the pursuit of the retreating Confederates.

According to the information provided by Ridenour, the nightly guard duty and the use of the blockhouses continued to roughly the end of the Civil War. After that time, nothing more was mentioned of the blockhouses.
