= Archie Clement =

American pro-Confederacy guerrilla leader

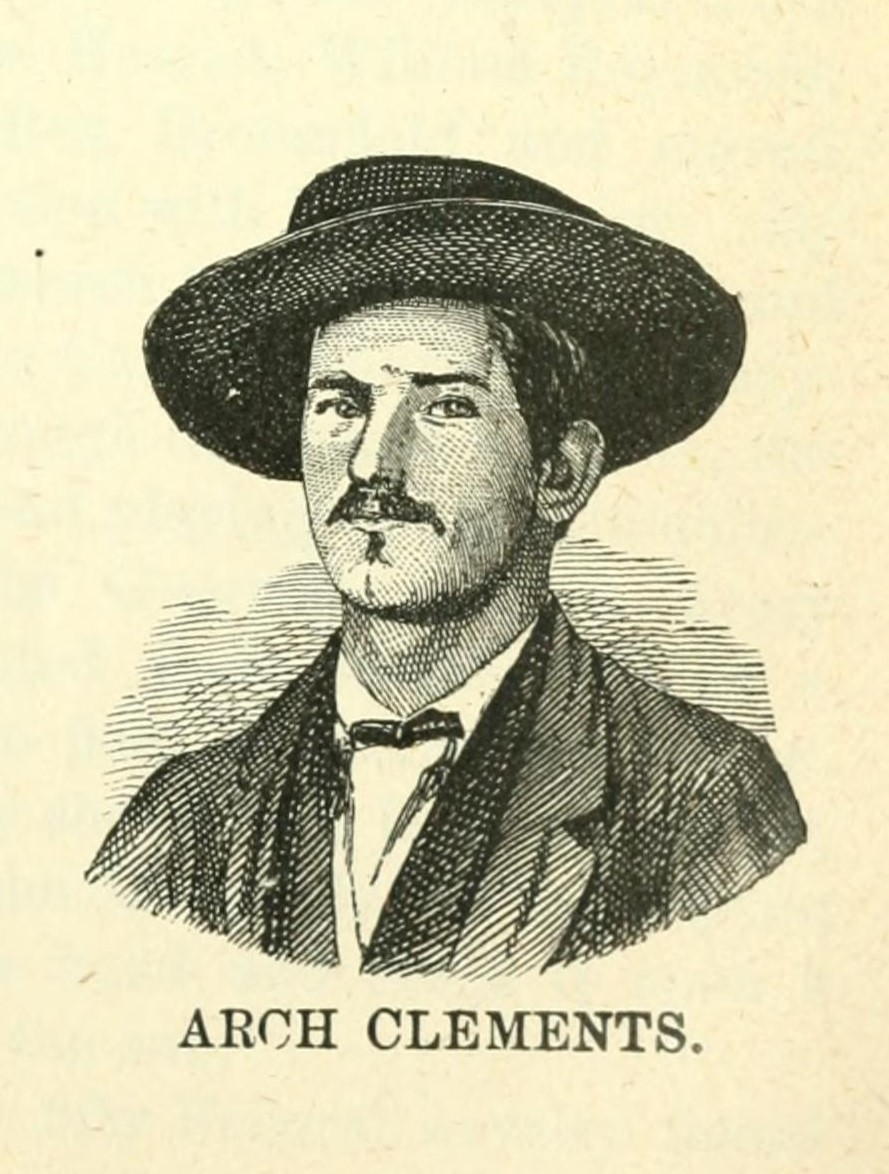
- Born: January 1, 1846; Stokes County, North Carolina, U.S.
- Died: December 13, 1866 (aged 20); Lexington, Missouri, U.S.
- Military career
- Rank: Lieutenant
- Nickname: Little Archie
- Conflicts: American Civil War

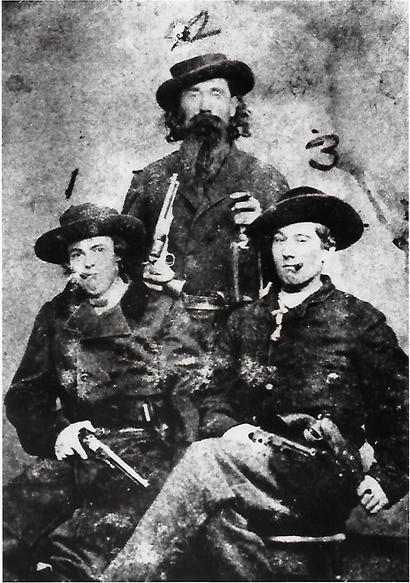
From left to right: Arch Clement, Dave Pool, and Bill Hendricks brandishing revolvers in Sherman, Texas, 1863

Archie Clement (January 1, 1846 – December 13, 1866), also known as "Little Arch" or "Little Archie", was an American pro-Confederate guerrilla leader during the American Civil War, known for his brutality towards Union soldiers and pro-Union civilians in the state of Missouri.

== Early life and Civil War ==
Clement was born in Stokes County, North Carolina and brought to Missouri with his family as a toddler. By the beginning of the American Civil War, he and his family were recorded as living in Big Creek Township, Cass County, Missouri. A Confederate "bushwhacker" or guerrilla during the Civil War, Clement rose to notoriety in 1864 as a lieutenant of William "Bloody Bill" Anderson. Clement soon became known as Anderson's most trusted follower—or, in the words of an enemy, "Bill Anderson's scalper and head devil." Standing just over 5 ft 0 in (1.52 m) tall and weighing about 130 pounds (59 kg), Clement's youth and slight stature belied his ferocity. Anderson (or one of his men) left this note on the body of a dead Unionist after a particularly vicious skirmish: "You come to hunt bush whackers. Now you are skelpt. Clemyent skept you. Wm. Anderson."

Clement took a prominent role in all of the major operations of Anderson's organization in 1864, including the Centralia Massacre, in which the guerrillas blocked the tracks of the Northern Missouri Railroad and forced a train to stop. They then robbed the civilian passengers and killed 22 unarmed Union soldiers found on board, who had been returning home on furlough from the Atlanta campaign. Anderson left one Union sergeant alive for a possible prisoner exchange. The guerrillas shot the rest, and scalped and otherwise mutilated the corpses.

Following Anderson's death in an ambush by Union militia on October 27, 1864, Clement took command, continuing to fight into the next year. Following the surrender of General Robert E. Lee's army in Virginia, Clement's band of guerrillas persisted, even demanding the surrender of the town of Lexington, Missouri. Though some comrades, including Dave Poole, surrendered, Clement and Jesse James remained under arms. On May 15, 1865, Clement and James encountered a Union cavalry patrol; a skirmish ensued in which James was severely wounded.

== Postwar ==
Beginning in 1866, Clement and his supporters turned to bank robbery, especially of banks associated with Missouri Unionists. On February 13, a group of gunmen carried out the first daylight, peacetime, armed bank robbery in U.S. history when they held up the Clay County Savings Association in Liberty, Missouri, stealing more than $58,000 in cash and bonds. The bank was owned and operated by former Union militia officers, who recently had conducted the first Republican Party rally in Clay County's history. The state authorities suspected Clement of leading the raid and offered a reward for his capture. In later years, the list of suspects would grow to include Frank James, Cole Younger, John Jarrette, Oliver Shepard, Bud and Donny Pence, Frank Gregg, Bill and James Wilkerson, Joab Perry, Ben Cooper, Red Mankus and Allen Parmer. During the escape through the streets of Liberty, one of the gang shot dead innocent bystander George Wymore. A string of robberies followed, many linked to Clement's gang. The hold-up most clearly linked to them was of Alexander Mitchell and Company in Lexington, Missouri, on October 30, 1866, in which they stole $2,000.

== Death ==
As the pivotal election of 1866 approached, political violence flared across Missouri. Much of it was associated with Clement, who harassed the Republican authorities who governed Missouri. On election day in November, Clement led a group of some 100 former bushwhackers into Lexington. Their gunfire and intimidation led to the defeat of the Republican Party in the election. In response, Governor Thomas C. Fletcher dispatched a platoon of state militia, led by Major Bacon Montgomery. Clement withdrew, only to return on December 13. Seeking to avoid a major battle in the center of town, Montgomery allowed Clement to enroll his men in the state militia.

After the bushwhackers left, Clement went to the bar of the City Hotel for a drink. Montgomery dispatched men to the hotel with a warrant for the Liberty robbery. The major's men found Clement drinking with an old friend and called out for him to surrender. Clement drew his revolvers and a wild gunfight ensued. Despite having sustained a gunshot wound to the chest, he escaped on his horse only to be shot by a militia detachment stationed at the courthouse. Montgomery and his men approached Clement, who, though mortally wounded, was trying to cock his revolver with his teeth. One of the soldiers asked, "Arch, you are dying. What do you want me to do with you?" Clement replied, "I've done what I always said I would do ... die before I'd surrender." Montgomery later stated of Clement's final moments, "I've never met better 'grit' on the face of the earth."

After Clement's death, his organization continued to rob while being pursued by government troops. Out of this group rose Jesse James, who would achieve notoriety three years later. Clement is buried in the Arnold Cemetery near Napoleon, Missouri.

== See also ==
- Guerrilla warfare in the American Civil War
