= William T. Anderson =

Confederate guerrilla fighter

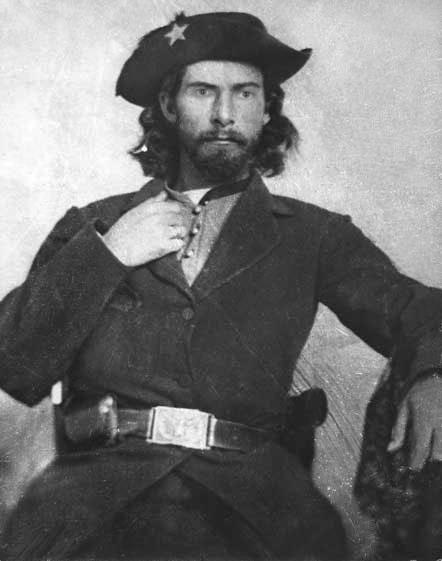
- Anderson in c. 1864
- Born: c. 1840; Hopkins County, Kentucky, U.S.
- Died: October 26, 1864 (aged 23–24); Albany, Missouri, U.S.
- Burial place: Pioneer Cemetery; Richmond, Missouri, U.S.
- Military career
- Allegiance: Confederate States of America
- Branch: Partisan rangers
- Service years: 1863–64
- Rank: Captain
- Nickname: Bloody Bill
- Units: Quantrill's Raiders
- Conflicts: American Civil War; Lawrence Massacre; Battle of Baxter Springs; Centralia Massacre; Skirmish at Albany, Missouri †

William T. Anderson (Note: Anderson's middle name is unknown. Wood speculates that it was "Thomas", his grandfather's name. (Wood 2003, p. 157)) (c. 1840 – October 26, 1864), known by the nickname "Bloody Bill" Anderson, was a Confederate soldier who was one of the deadliest and most notorious guerrilla leaders in the American Civil War. Anderson led a band of volunteer partisan raiders who targeted Union loyalists and federal soldiers in the states of Missouri and Kansas.

Raised by a family of Southerners in Kansas, Anderson began to support himself by stealing and selling horses in 1862. After a former friend and secessionist turned Union loyalist judge killed his father, Anderson killed the judge and fled to Missouri. There he robbed travelers and killed several Union soldiers. In early 1863 he joined Quantrill's Raiders, a group of Confederate guerrillas which operated along the Kansas–Missouri border. He became a skilled bushwhacker, earning the trust of the group's leaders, William Quantrill and George M. Todd. Anderson's bushwhacking marked him as a dangerous man and eventually led the Union to imprison his sisters. After a building collapse in the makeshift jail in Kansas City, Missouri killed one sister and left another permanently maimed, Anderson devoted himself to revenge. He took a leading role in the Lawrence Massacre and later took part in the Battle of Baxter Springs, both in 1863.

In late 1863, while Quantrill's Raiders spent the winter in Sherman, Texas, animosity developed between Anderson and Quantrill. Anderson made allegations implicating Quantrill in a murder, leading to the latter's arrest by Confederate authorities. Anderson subsequently returned to Missouri as the leader of his own group of raiders and became the most feared guerrilla in the state, robbing and killing a large number of Union soldiers and civilian sympathizers. Although Union supporters viewed him as incorrigibly evil, Confederate supporters in Missouri saw his actions as justifiable. In September 1864, Anderson led a raid on the town of Centralia, Missouri. Unexpectedly, his men were able to capture a passenger train, the first time Confederate guerrillas had done so. In what became known as the Centralia Massacre, Anderson's bushwhackers killed 24 unarmed Union soldiers on the train and set an ambush later that day which killed over a hundred Union soldiers. Anderson himself was killed a month later in battle. Historians have made disparate appraisals of Anderson; some see him as a sadistic, psychopathic killer, while others put his actions into the perspective of the general desperation and lawlessness of the time and the brutalizing effect of war.

== Early life ==
William T. Anderson was born around 1840 in Hopkins County, Kentucky, to William C. and Martha Anderson. His siblings were Jim, Ellis, Mary Ellen, Josephine and Janie. His schoolmates recalled him as a well-behaved, reserved child. During his childhood, Anderson's family moved to Huntsville, Missouri, where his father found employment on a farm and the family became well respected. In 1857, they relocated to the Kansas Territory, traveling southwest on the Santa Fe Trail and settling 13 miles (21 km) east of Council Grove. The Anderson family supported slavery, though they did not own slaves. Their move to Kansas was likely for economic rather than political reasons. Kansas was at the time embroiled in an ideological conflict regarding its admission to the Union as slave or free, and both pro-slavery activists and abolitionists had moved there in attempts to influence its ultimate status. (Note: At the time, some U.S. states allowed slavery, primarily those in the south, and some explicitly forbade it, primarily those in the north; whether newly created states would be "slave states" was a contentious and hotly debated issue. (Wood 2003, pp. 3–5)) Animosity and violence between the two sides quickly developed in what was called Bleeding Kansas, but there was little unrest in the Council Grove area. After settling there, the Anderson family became friends with A.I. Baker, a local judge who was a Confederate sympathizer. By 1860, the young William T. Anderson was a joint owner of a 320-acre (1.3 km^{2}) property that was worth $500; (Note: equivalent to $18,000 in 2025) his family had a total net worth of around $1,000. (Note: equivalent to $36,000 in 2025) On June 28, 1860, William's mother Martha died after being struck by lightning.

In the late 1850s, Ellis Anderson fled to Iowa after killing a Native American. Around the same time, William T. Anderson fatally shot a member of the Kaw tribe outside Council Grove; he claimed that the man had tried to rob him. He joined the freight shipping operation for which his father worked and was given a position known as "second boss" for a wagon trip to New Mexico. The trip was not successful and Anderson returned to Missouri without the shipment, saying his horses had disappeared with the cargo. After he returned to Council Grove, Anderson began horse trading, taking horses from towns in Kansas, transporting them to Missouri, and returning with more horses.

== Horse trading and outlawry ==
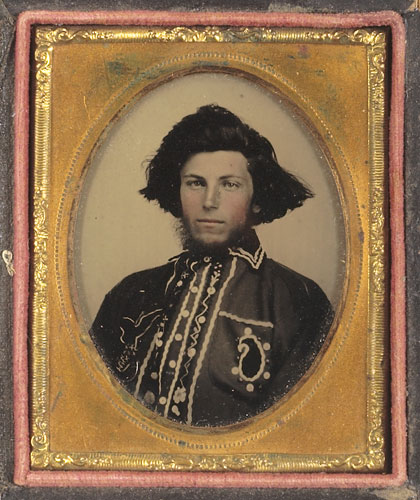
Anderson in an ambrotype photograph, c. early 1860s

After the Civil War began in 1861, the demand for horses increased, and Anderson transitioned from trading horses to stealing them, reselling them as far away as New Mexico. He worked with his brother Jim, their friend Lee Griffith, and several accomplices strung along the Santa Fe Trail. In late 1861, Anderson traveled south with Jim and Judge Baker in an apparent attempt to join the Confederate Army. Anderson had told a neighbor that he sought to fight for financial reasons rather than out of loyalty to the Confederacy. However, the group was attacked by the Union's 6th Regiment Kansas Volunteer Cavalry in Vernon County, Missouri; (Note: Although Wood states that Baker's group sought to join the Confederate army, Castel and Goodrich write that the group planned to conduct "Jayhawker" guerrilla raids on behalf of the Union. (Wood 2003, p. 13)(Castel & Goodrich 1998, p. 13)) the cavalry likely assumed they were Confederate guerrillas. The Anderson brothers escaped, but Baker was captured and spent four months in prison before returning to Kansas, professing loyalty to the Union. One way he sought to prove that loyalty was by severing his ties with Anderson's sister Mary, his former lover.

Upon his return to Kansas, Anderson continued horse trafficking, but ranchers in the area soon became aware of his operations. In May 1862, Judge Baker issued an arrest warrant for Griffith, whom Anderson helped hide. Some local citizens suspected the Anderson family was assisting Griffith and traveled to their house to confront the elder William Anderson. After hearing their accusations against his sons, he was incensed—he found Baker's involvement particularly infuriating. The next day, the elder Anderson traveled to the Council Grove courthouse with a gun, intending to force Baker to withdraw the warrant. As he entered the building he was restrained by a constable and fatally shot by Baker. The younger Anderson buried his father and was subsequently arrested for assisting Griffith. However, he was quickly released owing to a problem with the warrant and fled to Agnes City, fearing he would be lynched. There he met Baker, who temporarily placated him by providing a lawyer. Anderson remained in Agnes City until he learned that Baker would not be charged, as the judge's claim of self-defense had been accepted by legal authorities. Anderson was outraged and went to Missouri with his siblings. William and Jim Anderson then traveled southwest of Kansas City, robbing travelers to support themselves.

On July 2, 1862, William and Jim Anderson returned to Council Grove and sent an accomplice to Baker's house claiming to be a traveler seeking supplies. Baker and his brother-in-law brought the man to a store where they were ambushed by the Anderson brothers. After a brief gunfight, Baker and his brother-in-law fled into the store's basement. The Andersons barricaded the door to the basement and set the store on fire, killing Baker and his brother-in-law. They also burned Baker's home and stole two of his horses before returning to Missouri on the Santa Fe Trail.

William and Jim Anderson soon formed a gang with a man named Bill Reed; in February 1863, the Lexington Weekly Union recorded that Reed was the leader of the gang. (Note: In his 2003 history of Civil War Missouri, Bruce Nichols stated that Reed led the gang until mid-July 1863. (Nichols 2004, p. 151)) William Quantrill, a Confederate guerrilla leader, later claimed to have encountered Reed's company in July and rebuked them for robbing Confederate sympathizers; in their biography of Anderson, Albert Castel and Tom Goodrich speculate that this rebuke may have resulted in a deep resentment of Quantrill by Anderson. Anderson and his gang subsequently traveled east of Jackson County, Missouri, avoiding territory where Quantrill operated and continuing to support themselves by robbery. They also attacked Union soldiers, killing seven by early 1863.

== Quantrill's Raiders ==
Missouri had a large Union presence throughout the Civil War but was also inhabited by many civilians whose sympathies lay with the Confederacy. From July 1861 until the end of the war, the state suffered up to 25,000 deaths from guerrilla warfare, more than any other state. Confederate General Sterling Price failed to gain control of Missouri in his 1861 offensive and retreated into Arkansas, leaving only partisan rangers and local guerrillas known as "bushwhackers" to challenge Union dominance. Quantrill was at the time the most prominent guerrilla leader in the Kansas–Missouri area. In early 1863, William and Jim Anderson traveled to Jackson County, Missouri, to join him. William Anderson was initially given a chilly reception from other raiders, who perceived him to be brash and overconfident.

In May 1863, Anderson joined members of Quantrill's Raiders on a foray near Council Grove, Kansas, in which they robbed a store 15 miles (24 km) west of the town. After the robbery, the group was intercepted by a United States Marshal accompanied by a large posse, about 150 miles (240 km) from the Kansas–Missouri border. In the resulting skirmish, several raiders were captured or killed and the rest of the guerrillas, including Anderson, split into small groups to return to Missouri. Castel and Goodrich speculated that this raid may have given Quantrill the idea of launching an attack deep in Kansas, as it demonstrated that the state's border was poorly defended and that guerrillas could travel deep into the state's interior before Union forces were alerted.

In early summer 1863, Anderson was made a lieutenant, serving in a unit led by George M. Todd. In June and July, Anderson took part in several raids that killed Union soldiers in Westport, Kansas City and Lafayette County, Missouri. The first reference to Anderson in Official Records of the American Civil War concerns his activities at this time, describing him as the captain of a band of guerrillas. He commanded 30–40 men, one of whom was Archie Clement, an 18-year-old with a predilection for torture and mutilation who was loyal only to Anderson. By late July, Anderson led groups of guerrillas on raids and was often pursued by Union volunteer cavalry. Anderson was under Quantrill's command, but independently organized some attacks.

Quantrill's Raiders had an extensive support network in Missouri that provided them with numerous hiding places. Biographer Larry Wood claimed that Anderson's sisters aided the guerrillas by gathering information inside Union-controlled territory. In August 1863, however, Union General Thomas Ewing, Jr. attempted to thwart the guerrillas by arresting their female relatives, and Anderson's sisters were confined in a three-story building on Grand Avenue in Kansas City with a number of other girls. While they were confined, the building collapsed, killing one of Anderson's sisters. In the aftermath, rumors that the building had been intentionally sabotaged by Union soldiers spread quickly; Anderson was convinced it had been a deliberate act. Biographer Larry Wood wrote that Anderson's motivation shifted after the death of his sister, arguing that killing then became his focus and an enjoyable act. Castel and Goodrich maintain that by then killing had become more than a means to an end for Anderson: it became an end in itself.

=== Lawrence Massacre ===
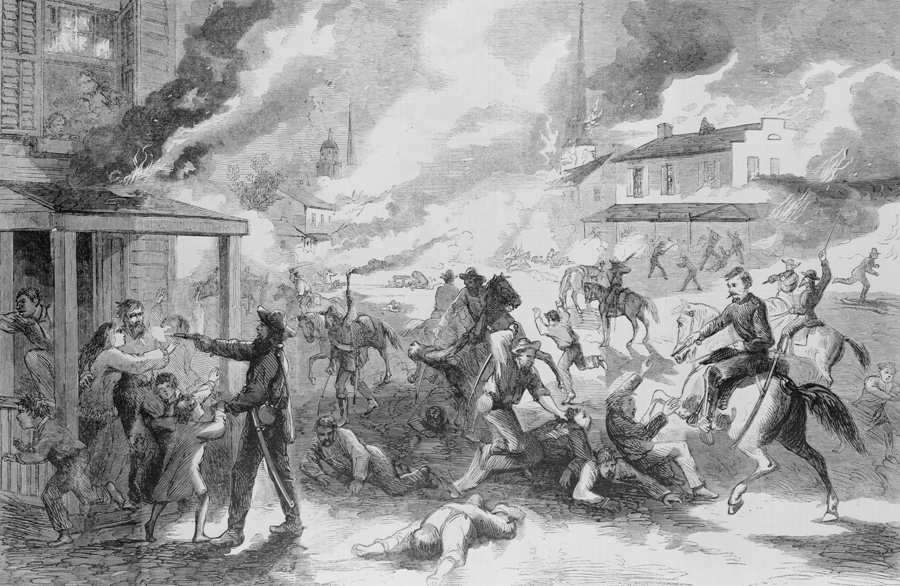
A painting of the Lawrence Massacre, in which Anderson played a leading role

Although Quantrill had considered the idea of a raid on the pro-Union stronghold that was the town of Lawrence, Kansas before the building collapsed in Kansas City, the deaths convinced the guerrillas to make a bold strike. Quantrill attained near-unanimous consent to travel 40 miles (64 km) into Union territory to strike Lawrence. The guerrillas gathered at the Blackwater River in Johnson County, Missouri. Anderson was placed in charge of 40 men, of which he was perhaps the angriest and most motivated—his fellow guerrillas considered him one of the deadliest fighters there. On August 19, the group, which proved to be the most guerrillas under one commander in the war, began the trip to Lawrence. En route, some guerrillas robbed a Union supporter, but Anderson knew the man and reimbursed him.

Arriving in Lawrence on August 21, the guerrillas immediately killed a number of Union Army recruits and one of Anderson's men took their flag. The Provost Marshal of Kansas, a Union captain who commanded military police, surrendered to the guerrillas and Anderson took his uniform (guerrillas often wore uniforms stolen from Union soldiers). They proceeded to pillage and burn many buildings, killing almost every man they found, but taking care not to shoot women. Anderson personally killed 14 people. Although some men begged him to spare them, he persisted, only relenting when a woman pleaded with him not to torch her house. The guerrillas under Anderson's command, notably including Archie Clement and Frank James, killed more than any of the other group. They left town at 9:00 am after a company of Union soldiers approached the town. The raiding party was pursued by Union forces but eventually managed to break contact with the soldiers and scatter into the Missouri woods. After a dead raider was scalped by a Union-allied Lenape Indian during the pursuit, one guerrilla leader pledged to adopt the practice of scalping.

== Texas ==
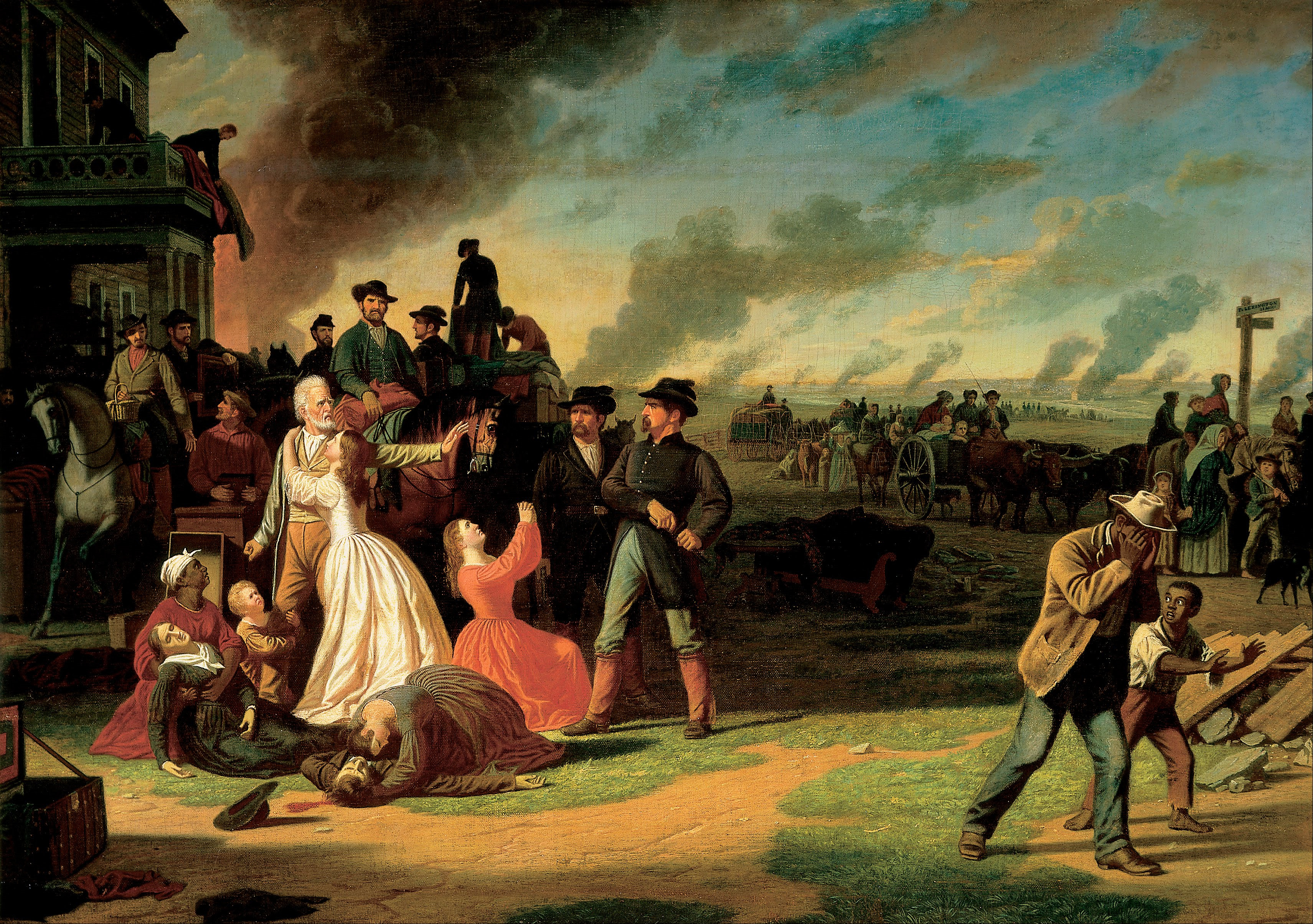
A painting by George Caleb Bingham depicting General Order No. 11, which was prompted by the Lawrence Massacre

Four days after the Lawrence Massacre, on August 25, 1863, General Ewing retaliated against the Confederate guerrillas by issuing General Order No. 11, an evacuation order that evicted almost 20,000 people from four counties in rural western Missouri and burned many of their homes. The order was intended to undermine the guerrillas' support network in Missouri. On October 2, a group of 450 guerrillas under Quantrill's leadership met at Blackwater River in Jackson County and left for Texas.

They departed earlier in the year than they had planned, owing to increased Union pressure. En route, they entered Baxter Springs, Kansas, the site of Fort Blair. They attacked the fort on October 6, but the 90 Union troops there quickly took refuge inside, suffering minimal losses. Shortly after the initial assault, a larger group of Union troops approached Fort Blair, unaware the fort had been attacked and that the men they saw outside the fort dressed in Union uniforms were actually disguised guerrillas. The guerrillas charged the Union forces, killing about 100. Anderson and his men were in the rear of the charge, but gathered a large amount of plunder from the dead soldiers, irritating some guerrillas from the front line of the charge. Not satisfied with the number killed, Anderson and Todd wished to attack the fort again, but Quantrill considered another attack too risky. He angered Anderson by ordering his forces to withdraw.

On October 12, Quantrill and his men met General Samuel Cooper at the Canadian River and proceeded to Mineral Springs, Texas, to rest for the winter. During the winter, Anderson married Bush Smith, a woman from Sherman, Texas. Anderson ignored Quantrill's request to wait until after the war and a dispute erupted, which resulted in Anderson separating his men from Quantrill's band. The tension between the two groups markedly increased—some feared open warfare would result—but by the time of the wedding, relations had improved. In March 1864, at the behest of General Sterling Price, Quantrill reassembled his men, sending most of them into active duty with the regular Confederate Army. He retained 84 men and reunited with Anderson. Quantrill appointed him a first lieutenant, subordinate only to himself and to Todd.

A short time later, one of Anderson's men was accused of stealing from one of Quantrill's men. Quantrill expelled him and warned him not to come back, and the man was fatally shot by some of Quantrill's men when he attempted to return. It is likely that this incident angered Anderson, who then took 20 men to visit the town of Sherman. They told General Cooper that Quantrill was responsible for the death of a Confederate officer; the general had Quantrill arrested. Sutherland described Anderson's betrayal of Quantrill as a "Judas" turn. (Note: In his biography of Quantrill, historian Duane Schultz counters that General Benjamin McCulloch had Quantrill arrested after his refusal to deploy to Corpus Christi. (Schultz 1997, p. 272)) Quantrill was taken into custody but soon escaped. Anderson was told to recapture him and gave chase, but he was unable to locate his former commander and stopped at a creek. There, his men briefly engaged a group of guerrillas loyal to Quantrill, but no one was injured in the confrontation. Upon returning to the Confederate leadership, Anderson was commissioned as a captain by General Price.

== Return to Missouri ==
Anderson and his men rested in Texas for several months before returning to Missouri. Although he learned that Union General Egbert B. Brown had devoted significant attention to the border area, Anderson led raids in Cooper County and Johnson County, Missouri, robbing local residents. On June 12, 1864, Anderson and 50 of his men engaged 15 members of the Missouri State Militia, killing and robbing 12. After the attack, one of Anderson's guerrillas scalped a dead militiaman. The next day, in southeast Jackson County, Anderson's group ambushed a wagon train carrying members of the Union 1st Northeast Missouri Cavalry, killing nine. The attacks prompted the Kansas City Daily Journal of Commerce to declare that rebels had taken over the area. Anderson and his men dressed as Union soldiers, wearing uniforms taken from those they killed. In response, Union militias developed hand signals to verify that approaching men in Union uniforms were not guerrillas. The guerrillas, however, quickly learned the signals, and local citizens became wary of Union troops, fearing that they were disguised guerrillas.

On July 6, a Confederate sympathizer brought Anderson newspapers containing articles about him. Anderson was upset by the critical tone of the coverage and sent letters to the publications. In the letters, Anderson took an arrogant and threatening yet playful tone, boasting of his attacks. He protested the execution of guerrillas and their sympathizers, and threatened to attack Lexington, Missouri. He concluded the letters by describing himself as the commander of "Kansas First Guerrillas" and requesting that local newspapers publish his replies. The letters were given to Union generals and were not published for 20 years.

In early July, Anderson's group robbed and killed several Union sympathizers in Carroll and Randolph counties. On July 15, Anderson and his men entered Huntsville, Missouri and occupied the town's business district. Anderson killed one hotel guest whom he suspected was a U.S. Marshal, but spoke amicably with an acquaintance he found there. Anderson's men robbed the town's depository, gaining about $40,000 (equivalent to $823,000 in 2025) in the robbery, although Anderson returned some money to the friend he had met at the hotel.

=== Growing infamy ===
In June 1864, George M. Todd usurped Quantrill's leadership of their group and forced him to leave the area. Todd rested his men in July to allow them to prepare for a Confederate invasion of Missouri. As Quantrill and Todd became less active, "Bloody Bill" Anderson emerged as the best-known, and most feared, Confederate guerrilla in Missouri. By August, the St. Joseph Herald, a Missouri newspaper, was describing him as "the Devil". As Anderson's profile increased, he was able to recruit more guerrillas. Anderson was selective, turning away all but the fiercest applicants, as he sought fighters similar to himself. His fearsome reputation gave a fillip to his recruiting efforts. Jesse James and his brother Frank were among the Missourians who joined Anderson; both of them later became notorious outlaws. General Clinton B. Fisk ordered his men to find and kill Anderson, but they were thwarted by Anderson's support network and his forces' superior training and arms. Many militia members had been conscripted and lacked the guerrillas' boldness and resolve. In 1863, most Union troops left Missouri and only four regiments remained there. These regiments were composed of troops from out of state, who sometimes mistreated local residents, further motivating the guerrillas and their supporters. The Union militias sometimes rode slower horses and may have been intimidated by Anderson's reputation.

On July 23, 1864, Anderson led 65 men to Renick, Missouri, robbing stores and tearing down telegraph wires on the way. They had hoped to attack a train, but its conductor learned of their presence and turned back before reaching the town. The guerrillas then attacked Allen, Missouri. At least 40 members of the 17th Illinois Cavalry and the Missouri State Militia were in town and took shelter in a fort. The guerrillas were only able to shoot the Union horses before reinforcements arrived; three of Anderson's men were killed in the confrontation. In late July, the Union military sent a force of 100 well-equipped soldiers and 650 other men after Anderson. On July 30, Anderson and his men kidnapped the elderly father of the local Union militia's commanding officer. They tortured him until he was near death and sent word to the man's son in an unsuccessful attempt to lure him into an ambush, before releasing the father with instructions to spread word of his mistreatment. On August 1, while searching for militia members, Anderson and some of his men stopped at a house full of women and requested food. While they rested at the house, a group of local men attacked. The guerrillas quickly forced the attackers to flee, and Anderson shot and injured one woman as she fled the house. This action angered his men, who saw themselves as the protectors of women, but Anderson dismissed their concerns, saying such things were inevitable. They chased the men who had attacked them, killing one and mutilating his body. By August 1864, they were regularly scalping the men they killed.

In early August, Anderson and his men traveled to Clay County. Around that time, he received further media coverage: the St. Joseph Morning Herald deemed him a "heartless scoundrel", publishing an account of his torture of a captured Union soldier. On August 10, while traveling through Clay County, Anderson and his men engaged 25 militia members, killing five of them and forcing the rest to flee. After hearing of the engagement, General Fisk commanded a colonel to lead a party with the sole aim of killing Anderson.

=== Missouri River and Fayette ===
On August 13, Anderson and his men traveled through Ray County, Missouri, to the Missouri River, where they engaged Union militia. Although they forced the Union soldiers to flee, Anderson and Jesse James were injured in the encounter and the guerrillas retired to Boone County to rest. On August 27, Union soldiers killed at least three of Anderson's men in an engagement near Rocheport. The next day, the 4th Missouri Volunteer Cavalry pursued them, but Anderson launched an ambush that killed seven Union soldiers. Anderson's men mutilated the bodies, earning the guerrillas the description of "incarnate fiends" from the Columbia Missouri Statesman. On August 30, Anderson and his men attacked a steamboat on the Missouri River, killing the captain and gaining control of the boat. They used it to attack other boats, bringing river traffic to a virtual halt. In mid-September, Union soldiers ambushed two of Anderson's parties traveling through Howard County, killing five men in one day. They found the guerrillas' horses decorated with the scalps of Union soldiers. A short time later, another six of Anderson's men were ambushed and killed by Union troops; after learning of these events, Anderson was outraged and left the area to seek revenge.

Anderson met Todd and Quantrill on September 24, 1864; although they had clashed in the past, they agreed to work together again. Anderson suggested that they attack Fayette, Missouri, targeting the 9th Missouri Cavalry, which was based at the town. Quantrill disliked the idea because the town was fortified, but Anderson and Todd prevailed. Clad in Union uniforms, the guerrillas generated little suspicion as they approached the town, even though it had received warning of nearby guerrillas. However, a guerrilla fired his weapon before they reached the town, and the cavalry garrisoned in the town quickly withdrew into their fort while civilians hid. Anderson and Todd launched an unsuccessful attack against the fort, leading charge after futile charge without injury. The defeat resulted in the deaths of five guerrillas but only two Union soldiers, further maddening Anderson.

On September 26, Anderson and his men reached Monroe County, Missouri, and traveled towards Paris, but learned of other nearby guerrillas and rendezvoused with them near Audrain County. Anderson and his men camped with at least 300 men, including Todd. Although a large group of guerrillas was assembled, their leaders felt there were no promising targets to attack because all of the large towns nearby were heavily guarded.

== Raid on Centralia ==
On the morning of September 27, 1864, Anderson left his camp with about 75 men to scout for Union forces. They soon arrived at the small town of Centralia and proceeded to loot it, robbing people and searching the town for valuables. They found a large supply of whiskey and all began drinking. Anderson retreated into the lobby of the town hotel to drink and rest. A stagecoach soon arrived, and Anderson's men robbed the passengers, including Congressman James S. Rollins and a plainclothes sheriff. The two were prominent Unionists and hid their identities from the guerrillas. As the guerrillas robbed the stagecoach passengers, a train arrived. The guerrillas blocked the railroad, forcing the train to stop. Anderson's men quickly took control of the train, which included 23 off-duty, unarmed Union soldiers as passengers. This was the first capture of a Union passenger train in the war.

Anderson ordered his men not to harass the women on the train, but the guerrillas robbed all of the men, finding over $9,000 (equivalent to $185,000 in 2025) and taking the soldiers' uniforms. Anderson forced the captured Union soldiers to form a line and announced that he would keep one for a prisoner exchange but would execute the rest. He addressed the prisoners, castigating them for the treatment of guerrillas by Union troops. After selecting a sergeant for a potential prisoner swap, Anderson's men shot the rest. Anderson gave the civilian hostages permission to leave but warned them not to put out fires or move bodies. Although he was alerted to the congressman's presence in the town, he opted not to search for him. The guerrillas set the passenger train on fire and derailed an approaching freight train. Anderson's band then rode back to their camp, taking a large amount of looted goods.

=== Battle with Union soldiers ===
Anderson arrived at the guerrilla camp and described the day's events, the brutality of which unsettled Todd. By mid-afternoon, the 39th Missouri Volunteer Infantry had arrived in Centralia. From the town, they saw a group of about 120 guerrillas and pursued them. The guerrillas heard that the cavalry was approaching, and Anderson sent a party to set an ambush. They drew the Union troops to the top of a hill; a group of guerrillas led by Anderson had been stationed at the bottom and other guerrillas hid nearby. Anderson then led a charge up the hill. Although five guerrillas were killed by the first volley of Union fire, the Union soldiers were quickly overwhelmed by the well-armed guerrillas, and those who fled were pursued. One Union officer reached Centralia and gave word of the ambush, allowing a few Union soldiers who had remained there to escape. However, most were hunted down and killed. Anderson's men mutilated the bodies of the dead soldiers and tortured some survivors.

In the official report of the incident by the Union brigadier general Clinton B. Fisk, he wrote that Anderson's men

subjected [Major Johnston and his soldiers] to the most inhuman butchery and barbarities that blacken the pages of history. Major Johnston was murdered and scalped. One hundred and thirty of his officers and men shared his fate. Most of them were shot through the head, then scalped, bayonets thrust through them, ears and noses cut oft [sic] and privates torn off and thrust in the mouths of the dying.

The Union lieutenant W. T. Clarke also described the scene of the incident as such

This should be washed out with the blood of the friends of these demons. Ears were cut off and all commissioned officers were scalped. One wounded man reports the privates cut from one wounded soldier while living and thrust in his mouth. Other shameful indignities upon the corpses are mentioned.

By the end of the day, Anderson's men had killed 22 soldiers from the train and 125 soldiers in the ensuing battle in one of the most decisive guerrilla victories of the entire war. It was Anderson's greatest victory, rivalling Lawrence and surpassing Baxter Springs in brutality and the number of casualties. The attack led to a near-complete halt in rail traffic in the area and a dramatic increase in Union rail security. Anderson achieved the same notoriety Quantrill had previously enjoyed, and he began to refer to himself as "Colonel Anderson", partly in an effort to supplant Quantrill. Sutherland saw the massacre as the last battle in the worst phase of the war in Missouri, and Castel and Goodrich described the slaughter as the Civil War's "epitome of savagery". However, Frank James, who participated in the attack, later defended the guerrillas' actions, arguing that the federal troops were marching under a black flag, indicating that they intended to show no mercy.

=== Aftermath ===
Anderson left the Centralia area on September 27, pursued for the first time by Union forces equipped with artillery. Anderson evaded the pursuit, leading his men into ravines the Union troops would not enter for fear of ambush. In the aftermath of the massacre, Union soldiers committed several revenge killings of Confederate-sympathizing civilians. They burned Rocheport to the ground on October 2; the town was under close scrutiny by Union forces, owing to the number of Confederate sympathizers there, but General Fisk maintained that the fire was accidental. Anderson watched the fire from nearby bluffs.

Anderson visited Confederate sympathizers as he traveled, some of whom viewed him as a hero for fighting the Union, whom they deeply hated. Many of Anderson's men also despised the Union, and he was adept at tapping into this emotion. The Union soldier held captive at Centralia was impressed with the control Anderson exercised over his men. Although many of them wished to execute this Union hostage, Anderson refused to allow it. On October 6, Anderson and his men began travelling to meet General Price in Boonville, Missouri; they arrived and met the general on October 11. Price was disgusted that Anderson used scalps to decorate his horse, and would not speak with him until he removed them. He was, however, impressed by the effectiveness of Anderson's attacks. Anderson presented him with a gift of fine Union pistols, likely captured at Centralia. Price instructed Anderson to travel to the Missouri railroad and disrupt rail traffic, making Anderson a de facto Confederate captain.

Reports regarding Anderson and his men indicate that they were documented as decorating their saddles and bridles with the hair or body parts of those they killed. Additionally, Anderson was said to have used a silk sash to tally his personal kills, marking one knot for every soldier.

Anderson traveled 70 miles (110 km) east with 80 men to New Florence, Missouri. The group then traveled west, disregarding the mission assigned by General Price in favor of looting. Anderson reached a Confederate Army camp; although he hoped to kill some injured Union prisoners there, he was prevented from doing so by camp doctors. After Confederate forces under General Joseph O. Shelby conquered Glasgow, Anderson traveled to the city to loot. He visited the house of a well-known Union sympathizer, the wealthiest resident of the town, brutally beat him, and raped his 12- or 13-year-old black servant. Anderson indicated that he was particularly angry that the man had freed his slaves, then trampled him with a specially-trained horse. Local residents gathered $5,000, which they gave to Anderson; he then released the man, who died of his injuries in 1866. Anderson killed several other Union loyalists and some of his men returned to the wealthy resident's house to rape more of his female servants. He left the area with 150 men.

== Death ==
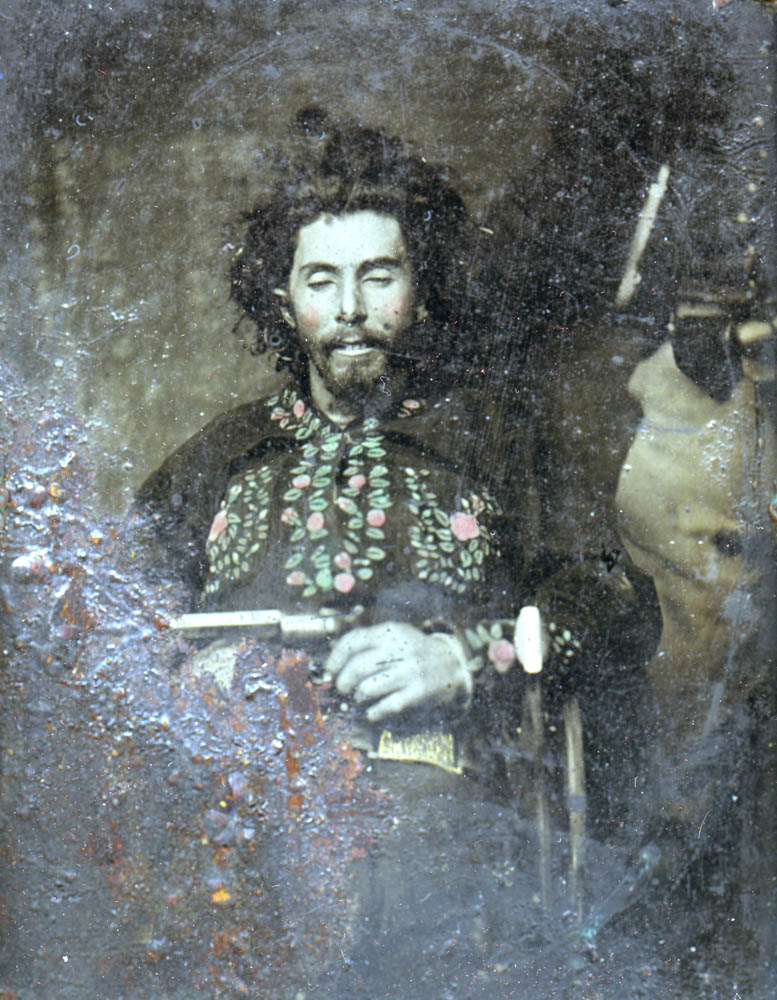
Anderson's body several hours after he died

Union military leaders assigned Lieutenant Colonel Samuel P. Cox to kill Anderson, providing him with a group of experienced soldiers. Soon after Anderson left Glasgow, a local woman saw him and told Cox of his presence. On October 26, 1864, he pursued Anderson's group with 150 men and engaged them in a battle called the Skirmish at Albany, Missouri. Anderson and his men charged the Union forces, killing five or six of them, but turned back under heavy fire. Only Anderson and one other man, the son of a Confederate general, continued to charge after the others had retreated. Anderson was hit by a bullet behind an ear, likely killing him instantly. Four other guerrillas were killed in the attack. The victory made a hero of Cox and led to his promotion.

Union soldiers identified Anderson by a letter found in his pocket and paraded his body through the streets of Richmond, Missouri. The corpse was photographed and displayed at a local courthouse for public viewing, along with Anderson's possessions. Union soldiers claimed that Anderson was found with a string that had 53 knots, symbolizing each person he had killed. They also found his flag, and one soldier described it as "... a small affair, made of fine silk, and the corner piece containing seven silver stars. On one side was -written in ink: " Presented to W. T. Anderson, by his friend, A. R. T.," and on the other side: "Do not let this be contaminated by Federal hands." Union soldiers buried Anderson's body in a field near Richmond in a fairly well-built coffin. Some of them cut off one of his fingers to steal a ring. (Note: Some accounts of Anderson's death relate that he was decapitated and his head impaled on a telegraph pole. Wood believes that these stories are inaccurate, citing a lack of documentary evidence. (Wood 2003, p. 157)) Flowers were placed at his grave, to the chagrin of Union soldiers. In 1908, Cole Younger, a former guerrilla who served under Quantrill, reburied Anderson's body in the Old Pioneer Cemetery in Richmond, Missouri. In 1967, a memorial stone was placed at the grave.

Archie Clement led the guerrillas after Anderson's death, but the group splintered by mid-November. Most Confederate guerrillas had lost heart by then, owing to a cold winter and the simultaneous failure of General Price's 1864 invasion of Missouri, which ensured the state would remain securely under Union control for the rest of the war. As the Confederacy collapsed, most of Anderson's men joined Quantrill's forces or traveled to Texas. Jim Anderson moved to Sherman, Texas, with his two sisters.

== Legacy ==
After the war, information about Anderson initially spread through memoirs of Civil War combatants and works by amateur historians. He was later discussed in biographies of Quantrill, which typically cast Anderson as an inveterate murderer. Three biographies of Anderson were written after 1975. Asa Earl Carter's novel The Rebel Outlaw: Josey Wales (1972) features Anderson as a main character, portrayed by veteran Western actor John Russell in the 1976 film adaptation The Outlaw Josey Wales. James Carlos Blake's novel Wildwood Boys (2000) is a fictional biography of Anderson. He also appears as a character in several films about Jesse James.

Historians have been mixed in their appraisal of Anderson. Wood describes him as the "bloodiest man in America's deadliest war" and characterizes him as the clearest example of the war's "dehumanizing influence". Castel and Goodrich view Anderson as one of the war's most savage and bitter combatants, but they also argue that the war made savages of many others. According to journalist T.J. Stiles, Anderson was not necessarily a "sadistic fiend", but illustrated how young men became part of a "culture of atrocity" during the war. He maintains that Anderson's acts were seen as particularly shocking in part because his cruelty was directed towards white Americans of equivalent social standing, rather than targets deemed acceptable by American society, such as Native Americans or foreigners.

In a study of 19th-century warfare, historian James Reid posited that Anderson suffered from delusional paranoia, which exacerbated his aggressive, sadistic personality. He sees Anderson as obsessed with, and greatly enjoying, the ability to inflict fear and suffering in his victims, and suggests he suffered from the most severe type of sadistic personality disorder. Reid draws a parallel between the bashi-bazouks of the Ottoman Army and Anderson's guerrillas, arguing that they behaved similarly.

Anderson is loosely portrayed by Jim Caviezel as “Black John Ambrose” in the 1999 Ang Lee film Ride With The Devil.

== See also ==
- George M. Todd – Confederate soldier (1839-1864)
- Partisan Ranger Act – 1862 act by the Confederate Congress
- William Quantrill – Confederate guerrilla leader (1837–1865)

== Bibliography ==
Books

- Castel, Albert E.; Goodrich, Thomas (1998). Bloody Bill Anderson: The Short, Savage Life of a Civil War Guerrilla. Stackpole Books. ISBN 978-0-8117-1506-5.
- Mayo, Mike (2008). American Murder: Criminals, Crimes and the Media. Visible Ink Press. ISBN 978-1-57859-191-6.
- Nichols, Bruce (2004). Guerrilla Warfare in Civil War Missouri: 1863. McFarland. ISBN 978-0-7864-1689-9.
- Petersen, Paul R. (2007). Quantrill in Texas: The Forgotten Campaign. Cumberland House Publishing. ISBN 978-1-58182-582-4.
- Reid, James J. (2000). Crisis of the Ottoman Empire: Prelude to Collapse 1839–1878. Franz Steiner Verlag. ISBN 978-3-515-07687-6.
- Schultz, Duane (1997). Quantrill's War: The Life & Times Of William Clarke Quantrill, 1837–1865. St. Martin's Griffin. ISBN 978-0-312-16972-5.
- Sinisi, Kyle S. (2020) [2015]. The Last Hurrah: Sterling Price's Missouri Expedition of 1864 (paperback ed.). Lanham, Maryland: Rowman & Littlefield. ISBN 978-1-5381-4151-9.
- Stiles, T. J. (2003). Jesse James: Last Rebel of the Civil War. Random House. ISBN 978-0-375-70558-8.
- Sutherland, Daniel E. (2009). A Savage Conflict: The Decisive Role of Guerrillas in the American Civil War. University of North Carolina Press. ISBN 978-0-8078-3277-6.
- Wood, Larry (2003). The Civil War Story of Bloody Bill Anderson. Eakin Press. ISBN 978-1-57168-640-4.

Journals

- Geiger, Mark (February 2009). "Indebtedness and the Origins of Guerrilla Violence in Civil War Missouri". The Journal of Southern History. 75 (1). Southern Historical Association: 49–82. JSTOR 27650402.
- Sutherland, Daniel (March 2000). "Sideshow no longer: A historiographical review of the guerrilla war" (PDF). Civil War History. 46 (1). Kent State University Press: 5–23. doi:10.1353/cwh.2000.0048. S2CID 144554839. Archived from the original (PDF) on August 20, 2013.

Newspapers

- Thies, Randy (January 28, 2001). "'Wildwood Boys' Brings Bloody Bushwacker to Life". Topeka Capital-Journal. Archived from the original on July 22, 2015.
