= Red Mountain (film) =

- Directed by: William Dieterle
- Screenplay by: John Meredyth Lucas; George F. Slavin; George W. George
- Story by: George F. Slavin (from a story by); George W. George (from a story by)
- Produced by: Hal Wallis
- Starring: Alan Ladd; Lizabeth Scott; Arthur Kennedy; John Ireland
- Cinematography: Charles Lang
- Edited by: Warren Low
- Music by: Franz Waxman
- Color process: Technicolor
- Production company: Hal Wallis Productions
- Distributed by: Paramount Pictures
- Release dates: August 3, 1951 (London); April 25, 1952 (New York)
- Running time: 84 minutes
- Country: United States
- Language: English
- Box office: $2 million (U.S. rentals)

Red Mountain is a 1951 American Western film set in the final days of the American Civil War. The film was directed by William Dieterle and stars Alan Ladd, Lizabeth Scott, Arthur Kennedy and John Ireland.

== Plot ==
In Colorado in 1865, after a gold assayer is killed, a posse pursues the suspect, Lane Waldron. When Lane is caught, the posse becomes a lynch mob. Lane claims that the assayer had examined a sample from his mine, but he denies shooting him. A noose around Lane's neck is shot in half at the last second by an unseen marksman, Brett Sherwood, a Confederate captain. Lane and Brett escape to a cabin, where Brett leaves a gun unattended as a test. Lane grabs it and aims at Brett, only to find that the gun is unloaded. Brett binds Lane's hands behind his back and leaves him in the cabin.

Lane's sweetheart Chris arrives at the cabin and releases him. They then track Brett, capture him and take turns guarding him for the night. When Brett discusses the war with Chris, he finds that her loyalties differ from Lane's, as she hates the rebels and General William Quantrill for killing her family. During the night, Brett escapes his bonds and a struggle ensues, during which Lane's leg is broken. Brett stops his escape to help Lane. Brett and Chris find a cave and move Lane inside. As Brett leaves to find a doctor, Quantrill and his raiders appear, taking Lane and Chris captive.

Quantrill has plotted an ambush to attack the army. One of his men tries to assault Chris, and Chris shoots him, which alerts the army of their presence. Quantrill learns of Lane's gold mine and decides to save him. Quantrill sends Chris and Randall to town for a doctor. During their absence, Brett questions Quantrill's motives. Brett and Chris return with a doctor who operates on Lane, saving his leg. However, Quantrill resolves to kill the captives anyway, so Brett brings them food and guns and helps the doctor escape to find help. After the doctor is caught and killed, Brett sneaks away to seek help.

A band of Indians who had been working with Quantrill attack Chris and Lane at the cave. Lane is shot by a Ute, who is killed by Chris. As he lies dying, Lane says that he wants Chris and Brett to have his gold mine. Brett arrives with the army and posse and then pursues and kills Quantrill. Brett confesses that it was he who had killed the assayer, who had been trying to cheat him and brandished a weapon.

== Cast ==
- Alan Ladd as Capt. Brett Sherwood
- Lizabeth Scott as Chris
- Arthur Kennedy as Lane Waldron
- John Ireland as Gen. William Quantrill
- Jeff Corey as Sgt. Skee
- James Bell as Dr. Terry
- Bert Freed as Sgt. Randall
- Walter Sande as Benjie
- Neville Brand as Dixon
- Carleton Young as Morgan
- Francis McDonald as Marshal Roberts (uncredited)

== Production ==
The film's working title was Quantrill's Raiders. The new title of Red Mountain was announced in May 1951.

At one stage Burt Lancaster and Wendell Corey, who were both under contract to Hal Wallis, were set to star, but the lead role was awarded to Alan Ladd.

The film was shot on location in New Mexico near the town of Gallup.

Director William Dieterle fell ill during the shoot and John Farrow replaced him, although Farrow was uncredited.

== Release ==
The film was first released in the United Kingdom, opening at the Plaza Theatre in London on August 3, 1951.

== Reception ==
In a contemporary review for The New York Times, critic Bosley Crowther wrote: "The fact that the real Quantrill got his death-blow under different circumstances and in a place entirely different from the painted desert that is the backdrop for this picture is a matter of only minor note. Nobody cares about history when making—or seeing—a Western film. The question is how many Indians or cowboys or what-not are killed and how much muscular action takes place within a given length of time. The answer in the case of 'Red Mountain' is plenty—but it's hard to figure why. If you can also overlook this minor detail, you will find it a fascinating film. ... The casualty list is terrific. It just doesn't make much sense."

== Home media ==
Red Mountain was released on Blu-ray format in 2024 by Kino Lorber under exclusive license from Paramount Home Entertainment. The Kino release notes state that a high-definition master was created in 2021 using a 4K scan of original nitrate negatives.
