= Battle of Baxter Springs =

1863 minor battle of the American Civil War

Coordinates: 37.0308°N 94.7350°W

- Part of the Trans-Mississippi Theater of the American Civil War
Date	October 6, 1863
Location	Cherokee County, Kansas
Result	Confederate victory; Union holds fort

Belligerents
(Confederate States of America) Confederate States	United States

Commanders and leaders
(Confederate States of America) William C. Quantrill (Confederate States of America) William T. Anderson	(United States) James B. Pond (United States) James G. Blunt

Strength
400 mounted guerrillas	96 infantry 200 cavalry 1 mountain howitzer

Casualties and losses
2 killed, 2 wounded	103 soldiers killed, 18 wounded, 10 civilians killed

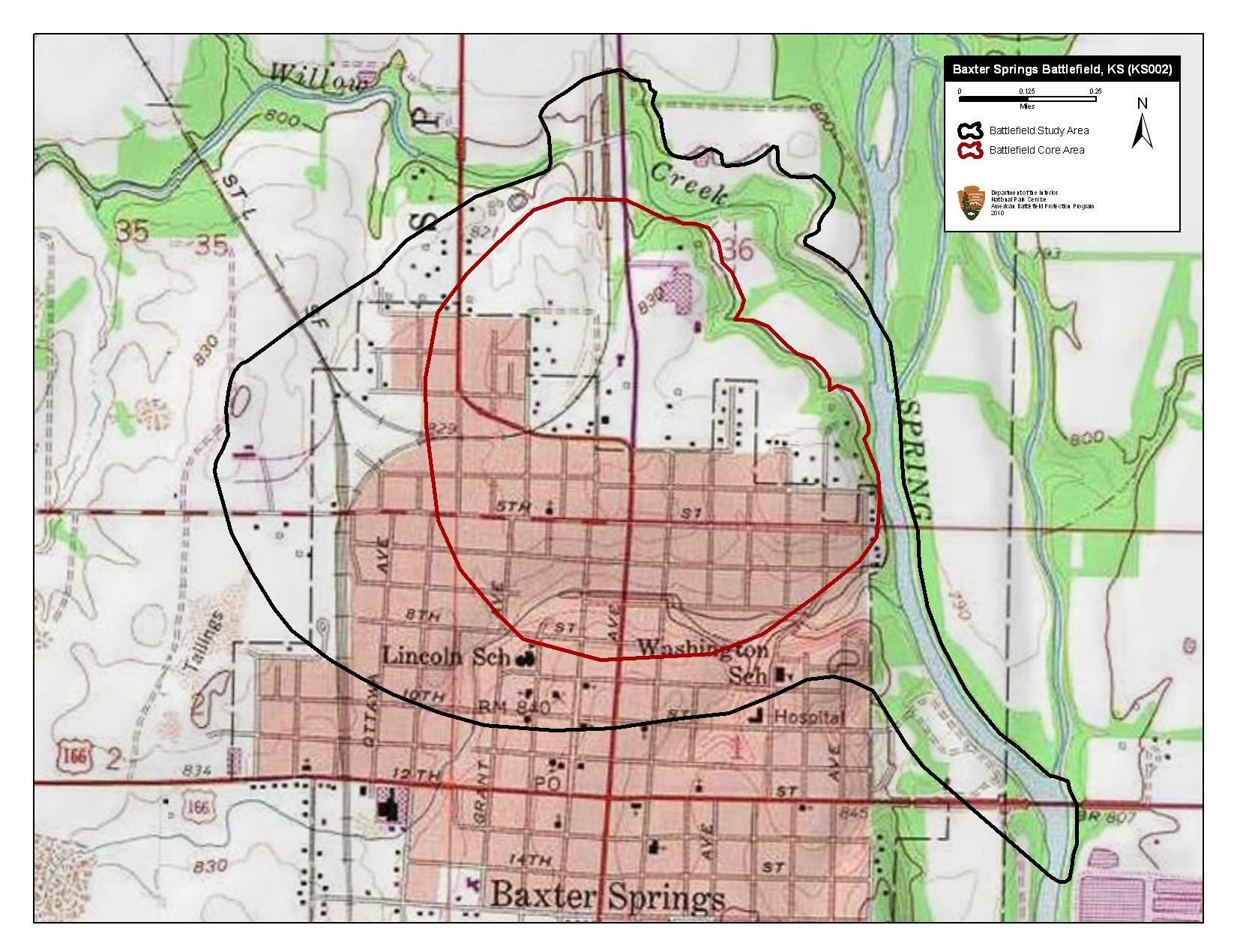
Map of Baxter Springs Battlefield core and study areas by the American Battlefield Protection Program

The Battle of Baxter Springs, more commonly known as the Baxter Springs Massacre, was a minor battle of the American Civil War fought on October 6, 1863, near the present-day town of Baxter Springs, Kansas.

In late 1863, Quantrill's Raiders, a large band of pro-Confederate bushwhackers led by William Quantrill, was traveling south through Kansas along the Texas Road to winter in Texas. Numbering about 400, this group captured and killed two Union teamsters who had come from a small Federal Army post called Fort Baxter (frequently referred to as Fort Blair). The bushwhackers assaulted the fort but were repulsed, eventually retreating to the prairie, where they attacked a separate Union column, leaving only a few survivors.

== Fight at the fort ==
Quantrill decided to attack Fort Baxter and divided his force into two columns, one under him and the other commanded by a subordinate, David Poole. Poole and his men proceeded down the Texas Road, where they encountered Union soldiers, most of whom were African Americans. They chased and attacked the Union troops, killing some before the soldiers reached the earth-and-log Fort Baxter. The garrison there consisted of about 25 cavalry and 65–70 infantry of the United States Colored Troops.

Poole's column attacked the fort, but the garrison fought them off. First Lieutenant James Burton Pond received the Medal of Honor for leading the defense of the fort. The citation for his Medal of Honor reads:

For extraordinary heroism on 6 October 1863, while serving with Company C, 3d Wisconsin Cavalry, in action at Baxter Springs, Kansas. While in command of two companies of Cavalry, First Lieutenant Pond was surprised and attacked by several times his own number of guerrillas, but gallantly rallied his men, and after a severe struggle drove the enemy outside the fortifications.. First Lieutenant Pond then went outside the works and, alone and unaided, fired a howitzer three times, throwing the enemy into confusion and causing him to retire.

The American flag remained standing over the fort thanks to the bravery of the 2nd Kansas Colored Infantry, who helped rally the federal soldiers.

== Massacre of Blunt's column ==
Moving out onto the prairie, Quantrill's column encountered a Union detachment escorting Maj. Gen. James G. Blunt, who was moving his command headquarters south from Fort Scott, Kansas to Fort Smith, Arkansas. Quantrill's men greatly outnumbered the Union forces.

Wearing Federal uniforms and thereby taking the Federals by surprise, Quantrill's column killed most of the detachment, including many who attempted to surrender. Among the dead was a military band, Maj. Henry Z. Curtis (son of Maj. Gen. Samuel R. Curtis), and Johnny Fry (first official westbound rider of the Pony Express), a total of 103 men. Also killed was James R. O'Neill, an artist-correspondent for Leslie's Weekly. When a few men escaped to Fort Baxter, soldiers went out to search for survivors; there were few, but Blunt was among them.

After the massacre of Blunt's troops, Quantrill sent a demand ordering Pond to surrender the fort. Pond refused the surrender. Quantrill's subordinate, William T. Anderson, known as "Bloody Bill," wanted to attack the fort again, but Quantrill refused, and the guerrillas left for Texas.

== Aftermath ==
Blunt was removed from command for failing to protect his column, but he was soon restored. Union supporters called the killings a massacre; the conflict at Baxter Springs was characteristic of the vicious Kansas–Missouri border warfare. Fort Baxter was temporarily reinforced, but by the end of 1863, the Union Army pulled its troops back to Fort Scott, which was better fortified. Before abandoning the fort, U.S. forces demolished it and removed everything usable to prevent use by the enemy. Quantrill and Anderson would continue to disagree on conducting warfare on the Kansas–Missouri border. In 1864, the two split their forces, limiting the bushwhackers' use to fighting in Missouri only.

Baxter Springs later developed as the first "cow town" in Kansas, a way station for cattle drives to markets and railroads further north. By 1875, it had a population estimated at 5,000.

== See also ==
- Battle of Lawrence
- Camp Ben Butler
- List of battles fought in Kansas
