= Centralia Massacre (Missouri) =

Massacre of Union army soldiers by Confederate guerrillas during the American Civil War

- Location: Centralia, Missouri
- Date: September 27, 1864; 9:00 a.m.
- Target: Union army soldiers
- Attack type: Summary executions
- Deaths: 24
- Perpetrator: Bushwhackers led by William T. Anderson
- No. of participants: ~80

The Centralia Massacre was the summary execution of 24 captured Union army soldiers in Centralia, Missouri on September 27, 1864, during the American Civil War by Confederate bushwhackers under William T. Anderson. Future outlaw Jesse James was among the killers. In the ensuing Battle of Centralia a large detachment of Union mounted infantry attempted to intercept Anderson, but nearly all of them were killed in combat.

== Background ==
In 1864, the military forces of the Confederate States, faced with a rapidly deteriorating position, launched an invasion of northern Missouri. It was led by General Sterling Price and his Missouri State Guard. The objective was to influence the 1864 presidential election by capturing St. Louis and the state capitol at Jefferson City. As part of his strategy, Price encouraged guerrilla warfare, especially the disruption of the railroads. "Bloody Bill" Anderson and his guerrilla company were among those who took part.

On September 23, 1864, Anderson engaged in a skirmish in Boone County, Missouri, seven miles east of Rocheport. His men managed to kill eleven Union soldiers and three civilian teamsters. The Union soldiers responded by shooting six of Anderson's men captured at a house in Rocheport the next day.

Also, on September 24, Anderson attacked the pro-Union town of Fayette, but the attack failed. Thirteen of Anderson's men were killed, and more than 30 were wounded. Only one Union soldier was killed, with two wounded.

== Massacre ==
At 9:00 a.m. on September 27, Anderson, with about 80 guerrillas, some dressed in stolen U.S. Army uniforms, moved into Centralia to cut the North Missouri Railroad. The guerrillas looted the town and reportedly drank whiskey from stolen boots. Anderson blocked the North Missouri Railroad line, a fact that the engineer of an approaching train failed to realize until too late, as the men he saw were wearing blue uniforms. The guerrillas swarmed the train and divided the 125 passengers between civilians and soldiers. A total of 24 Union soldiers were aboard, all on leave after the Battle of Atlanta and heading to their homes in northwest Missouri or southwest Iowa.

The U.S. soldiers were ordered at gunpoint to strip off their uniforms. When Anderson called for an officer, Sergeant Thomas Goodman stepped forward, expecting to be shot so the rest would be spared. Instead, Anderson's men ignored Goodman and began shooting the others. Anderson's men then mutilated and scalped the bodies. The guerrillas then set fire to the train and sent it down the tracks toward Sturgeon, Missouri. They torched the depot and rode away from the town. Sergeant Goodman was taken prisoner on Anderson's orders; it was planned that he would be later exchanged for one of Anderson's men held prisoner by Union forces. Goodman spent ten days in the captivity of the guerrillas before escaping at night as they prepared to cross the Missouri River near Rocheport.

== Battle of Centralia ==
Battle of Centralia
- Part of the American Civil War
Date	September 27, 1864
Location	Centralia, Missouri
Result	Confederate victory

Belligerents
(Confederate States of America) Confederate States	United States

Commanders and leaders
(Confederate States of America) William T. Anderson	(United States) A.V.E. Johnston †

Units involved
Bushwhackers	39th Missouri Infantry Regiment

Strength
80 mounted guerrillas	147 mounted troops

Casualties and losses
3 killed, 10 wounded	123 killed, 1 wounded

At about 3:00 p.m., Union Army Major Andrew Vern Emen Johnston, a former schoolteacher without much military experience, led 146 men of the newly formed 39th Missouri Infantry Regiment (Mounted) and rode into Centralia. The townspeople warned Johnston that Anderson had at least 80 well-armed men, but Johnston led his men in pursuit. The Union soldiers soon encountered the guerrillas, and Johnston decided to fight them on foot. Johnston ordered his men to dismount and form a line of battle.

Johnston then reportedly called out a challenge. Anderson's men replied by making a mounted charge. Armed with muzzle-loading Enfield rifles, the U.S. recruits were no match for the guerrillas with their revolvers. Johnston's first volley killed several guerrillas, but his men were overrun. Most were shot down as they attempted to flee. According to Frank James, his younger brother Jesse fired the shot that killed Major Johnston. Of the 147 Union soldiers, 123 were killed during the battle, with only one man wounded. Confederate forces lost three men and ten were wounded.

== Aftermath ==
On September 28, 1864, in a letter to Union Army General William Rosecrans, Union Brigadier General Clinton B. Fisk suggested depopulation and devastation in retribution for the massacre:

I had the honor to write you fully under yesterday's date, since which time my telegrams have advised you of the disasters at Centralia. The capture of the railway train, the inhuman slaughter of the defenseless soldiers thereon, the robbery of the passengers, the burning of the moving train, and the indignities visited upon helpless women must be regarded as one of the chief barbarisms of the war. ... We have in these counties not only the resident rebels, but in addition a large proportion of those who, by Gen. Ewing's order, were last year expelled from Johnson, Jackson, and other border counties. Depopulation and devastation are extreme measures, but if this infernal warfare continues it will be humane and economic of human life to adopt and vigorously enforce such measures wherever the bushwhackers have more friends than the government.

== See also ==
- Battle of Fort Pillow, a similar event five months earlier
- Battle of Baxter Springs
