= Cultural depictions of Jesse James =

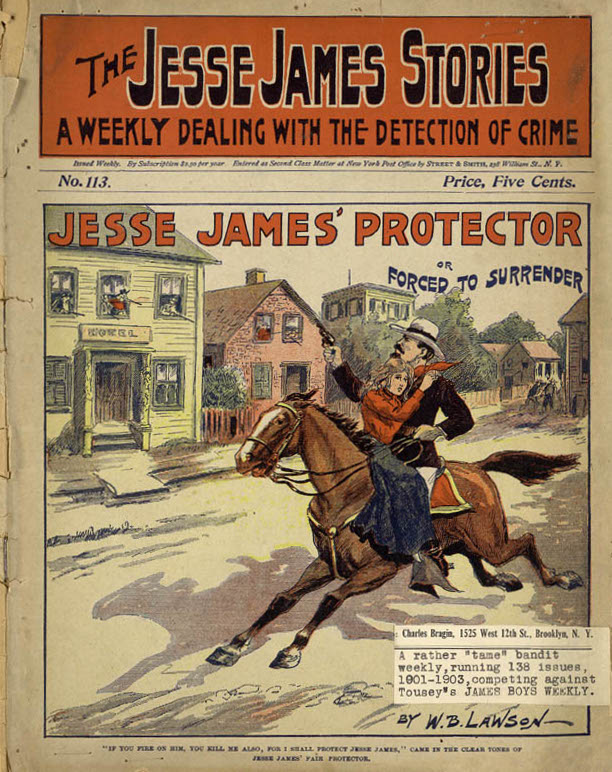
A dime novel featuring Jesse James from 1901

Cultural depictions of Jesse James appear in various types of media, including literature, video games, comics, music, stage productions, films, television, and radio. James is variously described as an American outlaw, bank and train robber, guerrilla, and leader of the James–Younger Gang. After the American civil war, as members of various gangs of outlaws, Jesse and Frank James robbed banks, stagecoaches, and trains across the Midwest, gaining national fame and even sympathy despite their crimes. James became an iconic figure from the era, and his life has been dramatized and memorialized numerous times.

== Literature ==
The James brothers became a staple in dime novels of the era, peaking in the 1880s following Jesse's death. James has often been used as a fictional character in many Western novels, including some published while he was alive. For instance, in Willa Cather's My Ántonia, the narrator reads a book entitled 'Life of Jesse James' – probably referring to a dime novel.

In Charles Portis's 1968 novel True Grit, U.S. Marshal Rooster Cogburn describes fighting with Cole Younger and Frank James for the Confederacy during the Civil War. Long after his adventure with Mattie Ross, Cogburn ends his days in a traveling road show with the aged Cole Younger and Frank James.

John Newman Edwards, editor of the Kansas City Times, was largely responsible for creating the legend of Jesse James and his fellow Confederate guerrillas.

During his travel to the "Wilde West", Oscar Wilde visited Jesse James' hometown in Missouri. Learning that James had been assassinated by his own gang member, "an event that sent the town into mourning and scrambling to buy Jesse's artifacts", and heightened the "romantic appeal of the social outcast" in his mind, Wilde wrote in a letter home that: "Americans are certainly great hero-worshippers, and always take [their] heroes from the criminal classes."

== Video games ==
In Bill & Ted's Excellent Video Game Adventure, the characters must give an Uzi to Jesse James. Jesse James has been playable in two games Gunfighter: The Legend of Jesse James for PlayStation and Gunfighter II: Revenge of Jesse James for PlayStation 2. He appears as an antagonist in Call of Juarez: Gunslinger (2013), where he is faced down against Silas Greaves in a duel. Jesse James' severed hand (or "shooting hand") makes various appearances throughout the Sam & Max point-and-click adventure game adaptations, often used as a solution to in-game puzzles.

== Comics ==
From 1950 to 1956 Avon Comics published 24 issues of Jesse James featuring art by Wally Wood, Joe Kubert and Everett Kinstler, among others. A selection of stories from these issues was published by AC Comics in 1990. In 1969, artist Morris and writer René Goscinny (co-creator of Asterix) had Lucky Luke confronting Jesse James, his brother Frank, and Cole Younger. The adventure poked fun at the image of Jesse as a new Robin Hood. Although he passes himself off as such and does indeed steal from the rich (who are, logically, the only ones worth stealing from), he and his gang take turns being "poor," thus keeping the loot for themselves. Frank quotes from Shakespeare, and Younger is portrayed as a fun-loving joker, full of good humor. One critic has likened this version of the James brothers as "intellectuals bandits, who won't stop theorizing their outlaw activities and hear themselves talk." In the end, the at-first-cowed people of a town fight back against the James gang and send them packing in tar and feathers.

== Stage productions ==
The musical melodrama "Jesse," written by Bob and Marion Moulton with lyrics by Prairie Home Companion writer/performer Vern Sutton and music by William Huckaby and Donna Paulsen, has since 1976 (the centennial of the James-Younger gang's Northfield bank raid) traditionally been performed in Northfield, Minnesota, during the town's annual Defeat of Jesse James Days.

== Films ==
There have been numerous portrayals of Jesse James in film and television, including two wherein Jesse James, Jr. depicts his father. In many of the films, James is portrayed as a Robin Hood-like character.

- 1921: Jesse James Under the Black Flag, played by Jesse James, Jr.
- 1921: Jesse James as the Outlaw, played by Jesse James, Jr.
- 1927: Jesse James, played by Fred Thomson.
- 1939: Jesse James, played by Tyrone Power with Henry Fonda as Frank James and John Carradine as Bob Ford
- 1939: Days of Jesse James, played by Don 'Red' Barry
- 1941: Bad Men of Missouri, played by Alan Baxter
- 1941: Jesse James at Bay, played by Roy Rogers
- 1942: The Remarkable Andrew, played by Rod Cameron
- 1943: The Kansan, played by George Reeves
- 1947: Jesse James Rides Again, played by Clayton Moore
- 1949: I Shot Jesse James, played by Reed Hadley
- 1949: Fighting Man of the Plains, played by Dale Robertson in his first credited role, with Randolph Scott starring as Jim Dancer
- 1950: Kansas Raiders, played by Audie Murphy
- 1951: The Great Missouri Raid, played by Macdonald Carey
- 1953: Woman They Almost Lynched, played by Ben Cooper
- 1953: The Great Jesse James Raid, played by Willard Parker
- 1954: Jesse James' Women, played by Don 'Red' Barry
- 1957: The True Story of Jesse James, played by Robert Wagner
- 1959: Alias Jesse James, played by Wendell Corey in a comedy starring Bob Hope
- 1960: Young Jesse James, played by Ray Stricklyn
- 1966: Jesse James Meets Frankenstein's Daughter, played by John Lupton
- 1969: A Time for Dying, played by Audie Murphy
- 1972: The Great Northfield Minnesota Raid, played by Robert Duvall
- 1980: The Long Riders, played by James Keach
- 1986: The Last Days of Frank and Jesse James, played by Kris Kristofferson with Johnny Cash as Frank James and Willie Nelson as Gen. Jo Shelby
- 1994: Frank and Jesse, played by Rob Lowe
- 1999: Purgatory, played by JD Souther
- 2001: American Outlaws, played by Colin Farrell
- 2005: Just like Jesse James is the title of a movie that appears in Wim Wenders' Don't Come Knocking, in which Sam Shepard plays an aging western movie star whose first success was with that movie.
- 2005: Jesse James: Legend, Outlaw, Terrorist (Discovery HD), played by Daniel Lennox
- 2007: The Assassination of Jesse James by the Coward Robert Ford, played by Brad Pitt, with Casey Affleck as Bob Ford. The film is considered one of the most historically accurate portrayals of Jesse James and Robert Ford.
- 2009: Jesse James is mentioned in The Boondock Saints II: All Saints Day by Pedro Salvin's character, Cesar.

== Television ==
- The actor Lee Van Cleef played Jesse James in a 1954 episode of Jim Davis's syndicated television series, Stories of the Century, the first western series to win an Emmy Award.
- In an episode of The Twilight Zone, "Showdown with Rance McGrew", Jesse James (played by Arch Johnson) confronts McGrew, an actor who stars in a TV western, about the shabby way he and other historical outlaws are portrayed on the program. The episode was written by Rod Serling, and originally aired on February 2, 1962, during The Twilight Zone's third season.
- The ABC series The Legend of Jesse James aired during the 1965–1966 television season, with Christopher Jones as Jesse, Allen Case as Frank James, Ann Doran as Zerelda Cole James Samuel, Robert J. Wilke as Marshal Sam Corbett, and John Milford as Cole Younger.
- In the episode of My Favorite Martian, entitled "That Time Machine Is Waking Up That Old Gang of Mine" (aired November 21, 1965) Jesse James (Mort Mills) and Frank James (L.Q. Jones) are accidentally transported to Tim's apartment.
- In the episode of Spider-Man, entitled "The Night of the Villains/Here Comes Trubble" (aired November 18, 1967) Jesse James (voiced by Jack Mather) is one of the wax dummies created by the villain Parafino for his robberies.
- In the episode of The Brady Bunch titled "Bobby's Hero" (aired February 2, 1973), Bobby Brady, much to his parents' dismay, has idolized the exploits of Jesse James (played in a dream sequence by Gordon Devol), leading them to try to dissuade him, including tracking down a descendant of one of James' victims (Burt Mustin) to talk to Bobby about the unseen dark and villainous side of the outlaw, as movies and stories of that era glamourized James's exploits, almost portraying him as a folk hero.
- In the episode of Little House on the Prairie titled "The Aftermath" (aired November 7, 1977), Jesse (Dennis Rucker) and Frank James (John Bennett Perry) took refuge in Walnut Grove after a failed robbery attempt.
- In an episode of The Dukes of Hazzard titled "Go West, Young Dukes" (aired November 16, 1984), a flashback to 1872 shows the main characters' great-grandparents dealing with the James brothers, with Paul Koslo as Jesse and Nick Benedict as Frank.
- In the American Western series The Young Riders (1989–1992), Jesse James is portrayed by actor Christopher Pettiet. He appeared in 17 episodes.
- In the episode of Lois & Clark: The New Adventures of Superman titled "Tempus Fugitive" (aired March 26, 1995), Superman (Dean Cain) meets Jesse (Don Swayze) and Frank James (Josh Devane) in 1866.
- In Episode 33 of Beyond Belief: Fact or Fiction in a segment titled "Mysterious Strangers" aired in (2002), a story is told about two men in 1870 who take refuge on a rainy night in an old widow's house. While there they find out that she is about to lose her home to foreclosure. The strangers disappear in the night, leaving her $900 to give to the banker, only to rob the banker of their own money after he retrieved it from the woman the next morning. The strangers, at the end of the story, turn out to be Frank and Jesse James. Beyond Belief purports that the story is documented and true.
- An episode of Deadliest Warrior which aired on (2010) on "Spike TV" features the Jesse James gang vs. the Al Capone gang. The main weapons used by Jesse James was the Colt .45, the Pistol Whip, the Winchester rifle, and the Bowie Knife. The Jesse James gang came out victorious in the simulated match.
- John C. MacDonald plays a fictionalized Jesse James in The Pinkertons, where he serves as a recurring antagonist. In the series premiere, the main characters, William Pinkerton and Kate Warne, along with Allen Pinkerton, are contracted to track down the culprits of a railroad robbery. A young man involved with the bushwhackers is revealed to be a young Jesse James, who reluctantly flees when the leader tells him to run after a gunfight. In a later episode, he schemes with a fictionalized Belle Starr (in which he is depicted as inspiring her turn to the outlaw life) but is apprehended by William Pinkerton. In the series finale, he plots assassinations throughout Kansas City and his harbored by his brother, Frank James, while being pursued by the Pinkertons.
- David H. Stevens starred as Jesse James in the 2016 AMC documentary The American West, narrated by Bert Thomas Morris.
- In an episode of Timeless titled "The Murder of Jesse James" (aired January 23, 2017), Jesse James is saved from being killed by the Fords but is eventually killed by one of the main protagonists.
- In the Pokémon anime series, two of the main antagonists are named "Jessie" and "James", a woman and a man working for the criminal organization "Team Rocket" alongside their partner Meowth. They are named after Jesse James in the English localization, as the original Japanese version had them named after historical rival swordsmen Miyamoto Musashi and Sasaki Kojirō, respectively.

== Radio ==
The killing of Jesse James was depicted on the CBS radio show Crime Classics on July 20, 1953, in the episode entitled "The Death of a Picture Hanger". The episode featured Clayton Post as Jesse James, Paul Frees as Charley Ford, and Sam Edwards as Robert Ford.
