= Stamping Ground, Kentucky =

- City
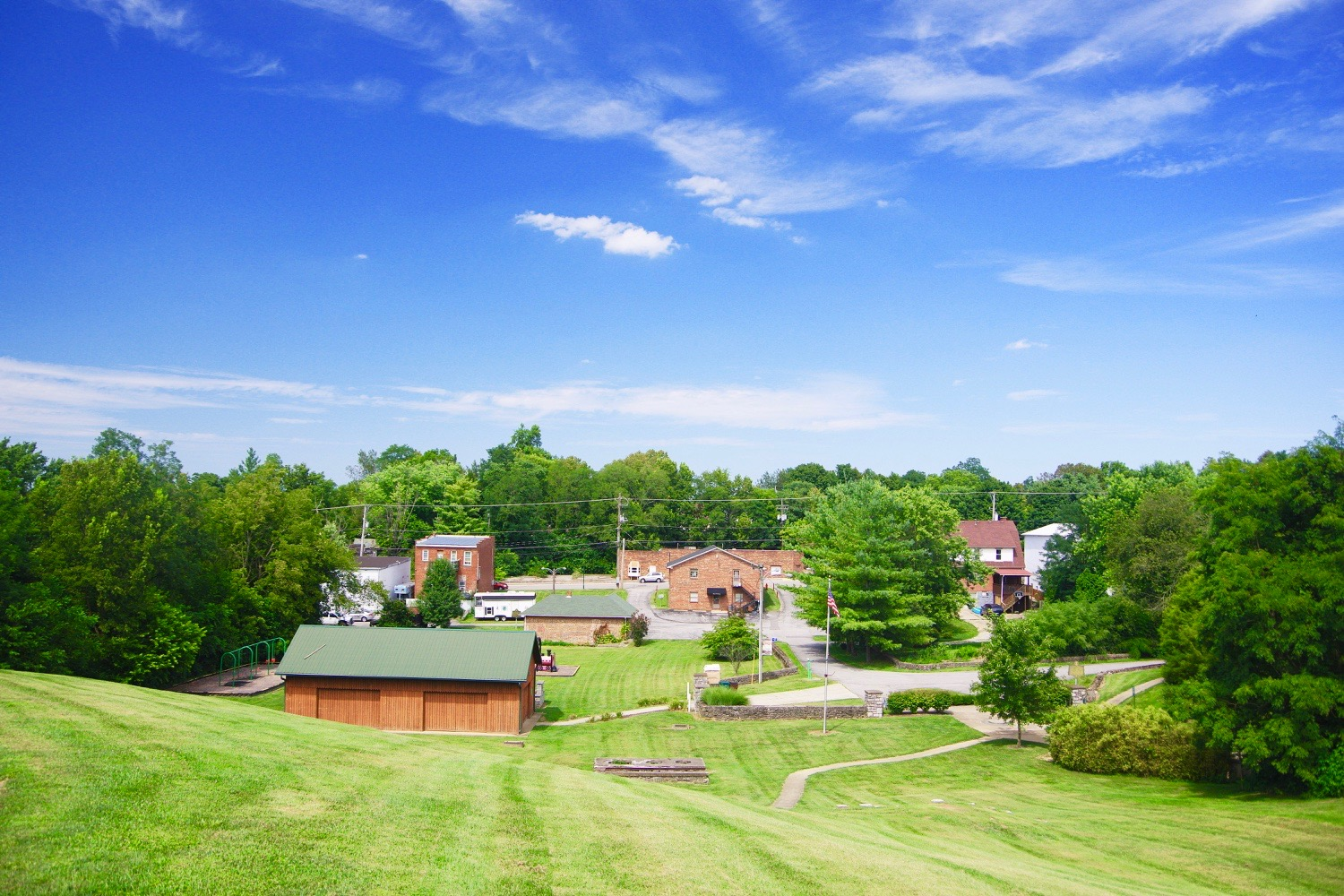
- Stamping Ground, viewed from Buffalo Springs Park

- Location of Stamping Ground in Scott County, Kentucky.
- Coordinates: 38°16′11″N 84°40′59″W
- Country: United States
- State: Kentucky
- County: Scott

Government
  - Mayor: Jennifer Murphy Jones

Area
  - Total: 0.59 sq mi (1.54 km^{2})
  - Land: 0.59 sq mi (1.52 km^{2})
  - Water: 0.0039 sq mi (0.01 km^{2})
- Elevation: 837 ft (255 m)

Population (2020)
  - Total: 780
  - Density: 1,327.2/sq mi (512.44/km^{2})
- Time zone: UTC-5 (Eastern (EST))
  - Summer (DST): UTC-4 (EDT)
- ZIP code: 40379
- Area code: 502
- FIPS code: 21-73038
- GNIS feature ID: 2405517
- Website: https://stampinggroundky.gov/

Stamping Ground is a home rule-class city in Scott County, Kentucky, United States. As of the 2020 census, Stamping Ground had a population of 780. It is part of the Lexington–Fayette Metropolitan Statistical Area.

== History ==
In April 1775, William McConnell and Charles LeCompte's party from Pennsylvania, first discovered the area surrounding what is now Stamping Ground. The party encountered a large spring from which herds of buffalo would drink. Due to the stamping of the buffalo's hooves while waiting to drink from the spring, the area was named Buffalo Stamping Ground, later shortened to Stamping Ground.

Stamping Ground was founded in 1790 and incorporated January 24, 1834. The first settlement was a fort built by Anthony Lindsay around 1790. The first road was cut through Stamping Ground in 1790 which connected Georgetown to Cincinnati, the road was most likely built upon the remnants of the Alant-o-wamiowee Trail. McConnell's Church, a Baptist church named after William McConnell, was established in 1795. The town's first post office was established in 1814 with Alex Bradford as the Postmaster.

On April 3, 1974, a tornado devastated Stamping Ground after causing major damage in Franklin County, as part of the 1974 Super Outbreak.

== Geography ==
According to the United States Census Bureau, the city has a total area of 0.6 square mile (1.7 km^{2}), all land.

== Government and politics ==
=== Mayor ===
Jennifer Murphy Jones was sworn in as Stamping Ground's mayor on June 4, 2025, after being appointed by Kentucky Governor Andy Beshear. Jones, 45, is a Scott County native who has lived in Stamping Ground for the last four years and had been serving as a city commissioner. Jones is the fourth person to serve as Stamping Ground's Mayor or Mayor pro-tem in the last year. Keith Murphy and Billy Swartz resigned due to health issues.

== Demographics ==
Historical population
Census	Pop.	Note	%±
1880	233		—
1890	311		33.5%
1900	373		19.9%
1910	381		2.1%
1920	335		−12.1%
1930	341		1.8%
1940	350		2.6%
1950	396		13.1%
1960	353		−10.9%
1970	411		16.4%
1980	562		36.7%
1990	698		24.2%
2000	566		−18.9%
2010	643		13.6%
2020	780		21.3%
U.S. Decennial Census

As of the census of 2000, there were 566 people, 230 households, and 152 families living in the city. The population density was 889.5 inhabitants per square mile (343.4/km^{2}). There were 245 housing units at an average density of 385.1 per square mile (148.7/km^{2}). The racial makeup of the city was 98.59% White, 0.35% African American, 0.53% Native American, 0.18% Asian, and 0.35% from two or more races. Hispanic or Latino of any race were 0.53% of the population.

There were 230 households, out of which 36.5% had children under the age of 18 living with them, 54.8% were married couples living together, 8.3% had a female householder with no husband present, and 33.9% were non-families. 30.9% of all households were made up of individuals, and 20.0% had someone living alone who was 65 years of age or older. The average household size was 2.46 and the average family size was 3.11.

In the city, the population was spread out, with 27.4% under the age of 18, 9.5% from 18 to 24, 30.2% from 25 to 44, 16.4% from 45 to 64, and 16.4% who were 65 years of age or older. The median age was 34 years. For every 100 females, there were 98.6 males. For every 100 females age 18 and over, there were 90.3 males.

The median income for a household in the city was $32,250, and the median income for a family was $43,500. Males had a median income of $31,161 versus $21,750 for females. The per capita income for the city was $17,047. About 2.5% of families and 8.2% of the population were below the poverty line, including 7.0% of those under age 18 and 18.1% of those age 65 or over.

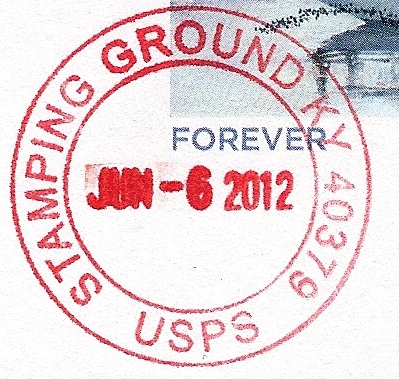
Stamping Ground postmark

== Education ==
Stamping Ground is home to a single school, Stamping Ground Elementary School.

== Notable residents ==
- Jack Cottrell Theologian, Professor of Theology at Cincinnati Christian University.
- Robert S. James and Zerelda James, parents of outlaws Frank James and Jesse James

== See also ==
- List of cities in Kentucky
