= Jesse James Under the Black Flag =

1921 film

- Directed by: Franklin B. Coates
- Written by: Franklin B. Coates
- Produced by: Mesco Pictures
- Distributed by: Grapevine Video
- Release date: March 1921
- Running time: 69 min
- Country: United States
- Languages: Silent; English intertitles

Jesse James Under the Black Flag is a 1921 American silent Western film directed and written by Franklin B. Coates. It is about the bandit Jesse James, who is portrayed by his son Jesse James Jr.

It is the prequel of Jesse James as the Outlaw, both released the same year and featured in theaters.

== Cast ==
- Jesse James Jr. as Jesse James
- Franklin B. Coates as himself
- Harry Hoffman as Cole Younger
- James Neill as Robert Standing
- Diana Reed as Lucille James, daughter of Jesse James Jr.
- Jack Neil as Robert Standing, Lucille's Sweetheart
- Harry Hall as Charles William Quantrell
- Marguerite Hungerford as Zee Mimms, Mrs. Jesse James
- F.G. McCabe as Bloody Bill Anderson
- Dan Paterson as Murdock
- Sunshine Baker as Mrs. Sam Clifton
- Ralph Johnson as Judge Bowman
- Hortense Espey as Mrs. Bowman
- Jack Wall as Captain Arch Clements
- Mrs. Cart as Jesse's Mother
- William Baker as Jesse's Step-Father
- Frances Coffrey as Susan, Jesse's Sister
- Elmo Red Fox as Chief Red Fox
