= Jesse James as the Outlaw =

1921 film

- Directed by: Franklin B. Coates
- Written by: Franklin B. Coates
- Produced by: Mesco Pictures
- Release date: March 1921
- Country: United States
- Languages: Silent; English intertitles

Jesse James as the Outlaw is a 1921 American silent Western film directed by Franklin B. Coates, cast designed by Edgar Kellar and starring Jesse James, Jr., Diana Reed and Marguerite Hungerford.

It is the sequel of Jesse James Under the Black Flag, released the same year. Both films were featured in theaters and were not financial successes.

== Cast ==
- Jesse James, Jr. as Jesse James
- Diana Reed as Lucille James, Jesse's Daughter
- James Neill as Robert Standing, Lucille's Sweetheart
- Marguerite Hungerford as Zee Mimms, Mrs. Jesse James
- Ralph Johnson as Judge Bowman
- Hortense Espey as Mrs. Bowman
- William Baker as Jesse's Step-Father
- Mrs. Cart as Jesse's Mother
- Frances Coffey as Susan, Jesse's Sister
- Elmo Red Fox as Chief Red Fox
- Gilbert Holmes as Pee Wee Holmes, Rodeo Bulldogger
- Harry Hoffman as Cole Younger

== Bibliography ==
- Boggs, Johnny D. (June 10, 2011). Jesse James and the Movies. McFarland Publishing. p. 279. ISBN 978-0-7864-8496-6.
