= Jackson County Jail and Marshal's House =

Historic building in Missouri, United States

- The 1859 Jail Museum
- U.S. National Register of Historic Places
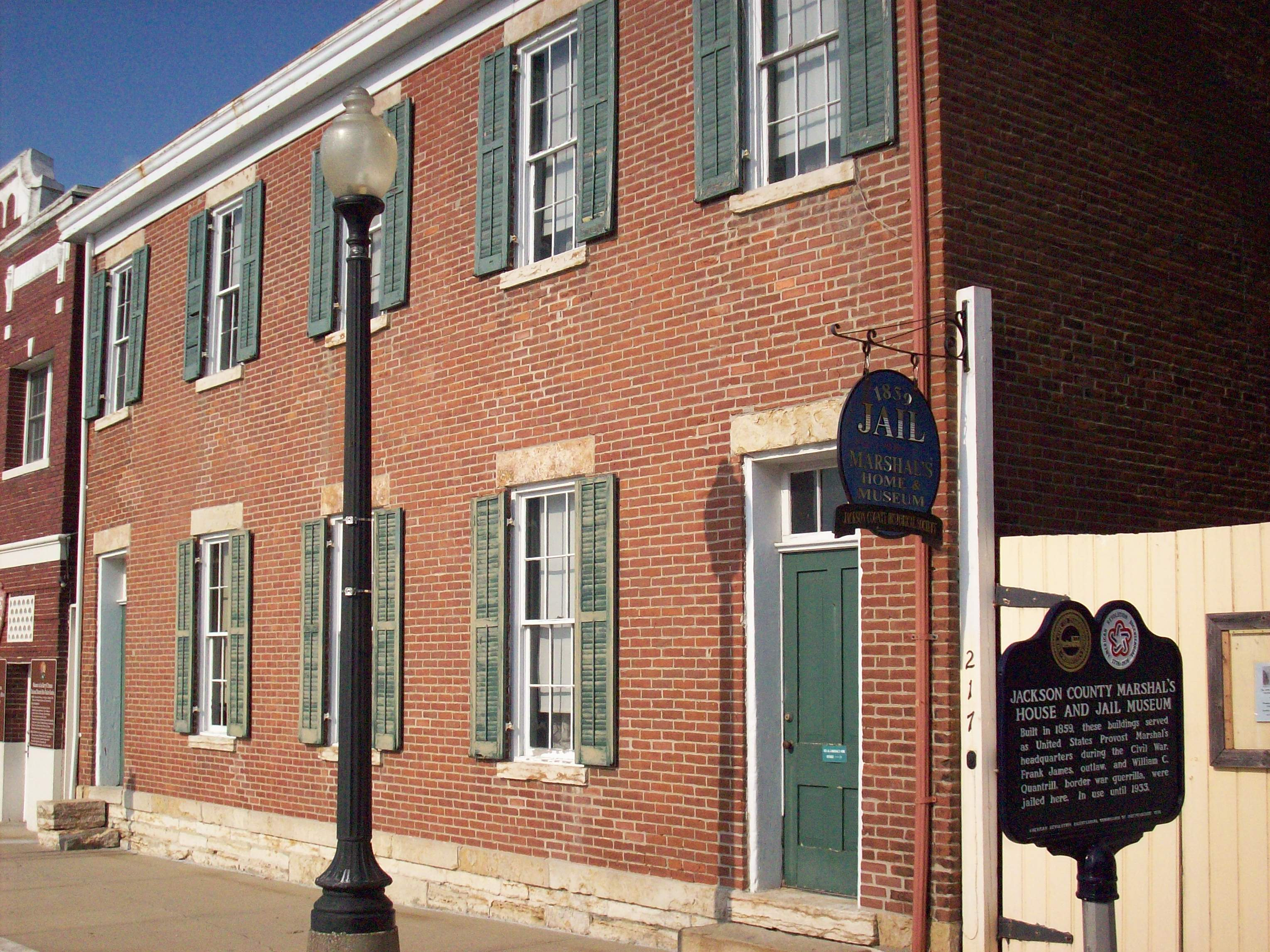
- Front of the jail

- Location within Missouri Location within the United States
- Location: 217 N. Main St., Independence, Missouri
- Coordinates: 39°5′36″N 94°24′55″W
- Area: 0.2 acres (0.081 ha)
- Built: 1859; 167 years ago
- Architectural style: Federal
- NRHP reference No.: 70000333
- Added to NRHP: June 15, 1970

The Jackson County's 1859 Jail Museum in Independence, Missouri, United States was constructed in 1859 as a county jail for Jackson County, Missouri. It was decommissioned and replaced in 1933. It has been restored as a public museum. It was listed on the National Register of Historic Places in 1970.

== Construction ==
The building was designed by A. B. Cross, a notable early architect in Kansas City, Missouri, and was constructed in 1859. The front is a home for the jailer, and the rear has twelve limestone jail cells. A brick structure was added on to the rear of the original jail in 1907, to house chain gangs who worked on roads, sewers, and other public projects.

The jailer's office formed part of the residence, but has a separate entryway from the house. The jail consisted of six upstairs and six downstairs cells, with two-foot thick walls of limestone blocks. A single kerosene lamp in the hallway provided the only light at night. Two doors, one of grated iron and one of solid iron, were provided for each cell, as was a window covered with grated iron that permitted wind from the outside to enter. The cells were not heated, and some prisoners died of exposure. Each cell is six by nine feet and intended for three prisoners, though during the Civil War, up to twenty prisoners were confined in each one.

The jailer's wife cooked meals for her family and the prisoners, in a small kitchen at the back of the house. The jailer was paid about US$50 (equivalent to about $1,800 in 2025) per month plus the use of the house.

Some of the crimes charged upon its prisoners prior to the Civil War included: horse racing on public streets, firing guns in town, operating a gaming house, assault and battery, disturbing the peace, disturbing a religious meeting, or building a privy "not over a pit".

== Notable prisoners ==
During the American Civil War, the jail held both military and civilian prisoners, and was the U.S. Provost Marshal's office. William Clark Quantrill, the famous Confederate guerrilla leader, was briefly incarcerated there, as were those who refused to take a pro-Union loyalty oath. After the war, its most famous inmate was Frank James, older brother to the famous outlaw Jesse James, who spent almost six months here in the 1880s. His cell was furnished with a Brussels carpet, fine furniture, and paintings. He was permitted free run of the jail and hosted card games in his cell at night. His cell is preserved as it was.
