= Zerelda Mimms =

Wife of American outlaw Jesse James

Zerelda Mimms James
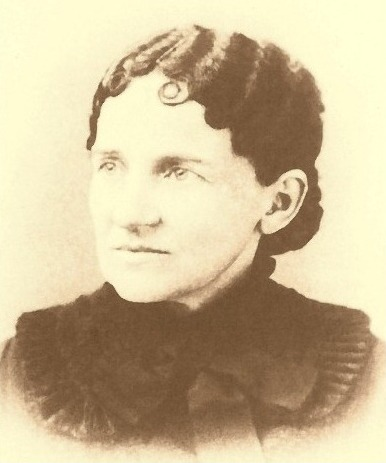
- James c. 1898
- Born: Zerelda Amanda Mimms; July 21, 1845; Kentucky
- Died: November 13, 1900 (aged 55); Kansas City, Missouri
- Spouse: Jesse James (m. 1874; died 1882)
- Children: 4, including Jesse E. James

Zerelda Amanda Mimms James (July 21, 1845 – November 13, 1900) was the wife and first cousin of Jesse James.

== Personal life ==
Zerelda Amanda Mimms was the daughter of Pastor John Wilson Mimms and Mary Elizabeth James. Her mother was sister to Jesse James' father, Robert S. James.

She and Jesse James married on April 24, 1874, while the James-Younger Gang was still in full force. Of the Jameses and Youngers, Jesse was the first to marry. Zerelda and Jesse had four children, two of whom died in infancy:

- Jesse Edward "Tim" James (August 31, 1875 – March 26, 1951)
- Twins Gould and Montgomery James (born February 28, 1878, and died in infancy)
- Mary Susan James (July 17, 1879–October 11, 1935)

== Death ==
Mimms died November 13, 1900, in Kansas City, Missouri, and was buried at Mount Olivet Cemetery in Kearney, Missouri. Eighteen months after her death, her husband's body was moved from the James family farm to rest next to hers.

== Portrayal in films ==
- 2007: In The Assassination of Jesse James by the Coward Robert Ford by Mary-Louise Parker
- 2001: In American Outlaws by Ali Larter
- 1995: In Frank and Jesse by Maria Pitillo
- 1980: In The Long Riders by Savannah Smith Boucher
- 1949: In I Shot Jesse James by Barbara Woodell
- 1957: In The True Story of Jesse James by Hope Lange
- 1953: In The Great Jesse James Raid by Barbara Woodell
- 1939: In Jesse James by Nancy Kelly
- 1927: In Jesse James by Nora Lane
- 1921: In Jesse James as the Outlaw by Marguerite Hungerford
