= Jack Cottrell =

American theologian and academic

- Born: April 30, 1938; Stamping Ground, Kentucky, U.S.
- Died: September 16, 2022 (aged 84)
- Education: Cincinnati Christian University (BA); University of Cincinnati (BS); Westminster Theological Seminary (MDiv); Princeton Theological Seminary (PhD)
- Occupations: Theologian; philosopher; author
- Spouse: Barbara (m. 1958)

Jack Cottrell (April 30, 1938 – September 16, 2022) was a Christian theologian, philosopher and author in the Christian churches and churches of Christ. He was a professor of theology at Cincinnati Christian University from 1967 to 2015. He authored many books on Christian philosophy, doctrine and theology.

== Early life and education ==
Jack Cottrell was born in Stamping Ground, Kentucky. Cottrell received a BA from Cincinnati Christian University in 1959 and also a BS from the University of Cincinnati. He earned an M.Div. from Westminster Theological Seminary and a Ph.D. from Princeton Theological Seminary. His book "BAPTISM: Zwingli or the Bible" is a "layman's" version of his doctoral thesis.

Cottrell married his wife Barbara in 1958.

== Cincinnati Christian University ==
Cottrell returned to Cincinnati Christian University in 1967 holding a conservative view of the Bible and Christianity. He taught at CCU for 49 years.

== Books & Articles ==
Cottrell authored 45 books on Christian theology and doctrine, including 24 books in the last five years of his life. Topics included grace, faith, baptism, Biblical accuracy, Biblical consistency, and the nature of God. He also wrote on leadership and gender roles in Christianity.

His books include:

- Baptism: A Biblical Study
- The Holy Spirit: A Biblical Study
- The Faith Once for All: Bible Doctrine for Today
- Bible Prophecy and End Times
- Set Free! What the Bible Says About Grace
- Power From On High: What the Bible Says About the Holy Spirit
- Tough Questions
- Biblical Answers Parts One and Two
- 13 Lessons on Grace and His Truth: Scriptural Truths About Basic Doctrines
- Faith's Fundamentals: Seven Essentials of Christian Belief
- God Most High: What the Bible Says about God the Creator, Ruler, Redeemer
- Solid: The Authority of God's Word
- Studies in First Peter: 35 Lessons for Personal or Group Study
- Saved by Grace: The Essence of Christianity
- The Collected Writings of Jack Cottrell (Volumes 1 - 18)
  - The Unity of Truth - Vol. 1
  - God's Word is Truth - Vol. 2
  - The God of the Bible - Vol. 3
  - The Bible Versus Calvinism - Vol. 4
  - One Baptism Into Christ - Vol. 5
  - Biblical Anthropology: Man, Sin, and Death - Vol. 6
  - Jesus: Lord and Savior – Vol. 7
  - Spirits: Holy and Unholy – Vol. 8
  - God's Amazing Salvation (Vol. 1) – Vol. 9
  - God's Amazing Salvation (Vol. 2) – Vol. 10
  - The Church of Jesus Christ – Vol. 11
  - From Now to Eternity – Vol. 12
  - The Gender Roles Debate – Vol. 13
  - Living the Sanctified Life – Vol. 14
  - The Ten Commandments – Vol. 15
  - Cults and the Occult – Vol. 16
  - The Reasons for Our Hope – Vol. 17
  - Studies in Bible Doctrine – Vol. 18
- Studies in Ephesians: 25 Lessons for Personal or Group Study
- Studies in Romans - Part 1
- Studies in Romans - Part 2
- BAPTISM: Zwingli or the Bible

He has also authored Biblical commentaries. Including:

- Romans NIV Commentary

A prolific writer, Cottrell wrote articles in a variety of Christian publications. His articles appeared most frequently in The Restoration Herald, published monthly by The Christian Restoration Association ("C.R.A.") in Mason, Ohio. Cottrell served as a Trustee of the C.R.A. from 2003 to 2021. In December 1961, he submitted an opinion piece for The Restoration Herald and then in June of the following year his article "The Use of Scriptural Terminology by Disciples of Christ Leaders" was published in a four-part series. In April 2011, he began penning the "Ask the Professor" column which appeared monthly.

== Theology ==
Cottrell supported conservative beliefs of inerrancy and infallibility of the Bible and that baptism by immersion is the Biblical method. Cottrell was critical of Calvinism and mostly supported Arminianism, despite attending theological institutions associated with the Reformed tradition.

=== Trinity ===
Cottrell believed that the "Father, Son and Spirit are distinct persons who exist simultaneously and interact with one another." He rejected modalism, which says that there are no distinctions between God the Father, God the Son, and God the Holy Spirit. Cottrell called modalism heretical and a "seriously false doctrine" but believed someone who believes in modalism can be saved.

=== Original Sin ===
Cottrell denied original sin, at least in the traditional sense. He believed that Romans 5:12-18 actually states that any original sin that might have existed is wiped out by "Original Grace" given to everyone through the death and resurrection of Jesus. When a person sins, they receive partial depravity. Cottrell defined partial depravity as, "no matter how evil sinners may be, they all have the ability to make a free-will choice to accept the gospel."

=== Temporality of God ===
Cottrell posited that God is temporal, although not bound by time.

=== Baptism ===
Cottrell believed that baptism is "commanded in a salvation situation", stating that baptism is required for salvation. He said that "repentance and baptism are ... obedience to the gospel, and are works in the same sense that faith is."

=== Anti-Feminism ===
Cottrell was a leading opponent in the Christian Churches and Churches of Christ of equality for women.

In the late 1980s, Cottrell became alarmed by the incursion of feminism in the church, which he believed was against God's original design for the church. He published the book Feminism and the Bible: An Introduction to Feminism for Christians in 1992. The book dismissed every version of feminism, including evangelical feminism, as unscriptural.

Cottrell sat on the Council on Biblical Manhood and Womanhood. The mission of CBMW stats that it is "primarily to help the church defend against the accommodation of secular feminism." (CBMW Mission and Vision Statement) As enumerated in its [Danvers Statement], CBMW is an evangelical organization that seeks to encourage women to the roles assigned to them by the Bible. Moreover, in every walk of life, men are expected to "exercise headship" while women are to "be in submission".(Danvers Statement)

Cottrell published two more books, Gender Roles and the Bible: Creation, the Fall, and Redemption: A Critique of Feminist Biblical Interpretation (1995), and Headship, Submission, and the Bible: Gender Roles in the Home (2008).
