= Reuben Samuel =

American outlaw (1828–1908)

- Born: January 12, 1828; Owen County, Kentucky, U.S.
- Died: March 1, 1908 (aged 80); St. Joseph, Missouri, U.S.
- Occupations: Doctor, farmer
- Spouse: Zerelda James (m. 1855)
- Children: 4 (possibly 5)

Reuben Samuel (January 12, 1828 – March 1, 1908) was the stepfather of the American outlaws Frank and Jesse James. He was married to the pair's mother, Zerelda James, from 1855 until his death in 1908.

== Early life ==
Reuben was the son of Fielding and Louisa Samuel, and was born and raised in Kentucky in 1828. He traveled to Cincinnati to attend medical school.

The third husband of Frank and Jesse James' mother, Zerelda, Samuel was 27 years old when he married the 30-year-old Zerelda on September 25, 1855. He left behind the medical profession upon marrying Zerelda and moved onto a farm, raised tobacco, and acquired a total of seven slaves by 1860. He took on Zerelda's three living children, Frank, Jesse, and Susan, as well as having four more with Zerelda:

- Sarah Louisa Samuel (April 7, 1858 – July 14, 1921)
- John Thomas Samuel (December 25, 1861 – March 15, 1934)
- Fanny Quantrill Samuel (October 18, 1863 – May 3, 1922)
- Archie Peyton Samuel (July 26, 1866 – January 26, 1875)

== Civil War ==
During the American Civil War, militiamen searching for Frank James (who had joined the South) raided the Samuel farm, and briefly (though not fatally) hanged Dr. Samuel, torturing him to reveal the location of the guerrillas. Some researchers believe that Frank joined William Quantrill's pro-Confederate guerrillas in the August 21, 1863, Lawrence Massacre, but it has never been proven.

== Pinkerton Raid ==
On January 25, 1875, Allan Pinkerton, the Pinkerton Agency's founder and leader, attempted to capture the outlaw James brothers. He staged a raid on Samuel's homestead, throwing an incendiary device into the house; it exploded, killing James's young half-brother Archie (named for Archie Clement) and blowing off the right arm of Zerelda. Samuel himself almost died and suffered brain damage from the explosion. Though Pinkerton denied that the raid's intent was arson, a letter written by Pinkerton was discovered in the Library of Congress in which he declared his intention to "burn the house down."

== Death ==
Samuel died in 1908 after spending seven years at the St. Joseph State Hospital for the Insane, in St. Joseph, Missouri. He was 80 years old.

Some of Reuben Samuel's family still live in the Kansas City, Missouri area.
