= Jesse E. James =

American lawyer, actor (1875–1951)

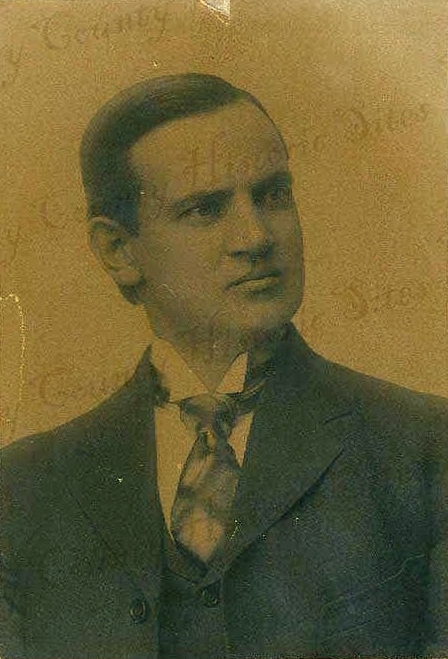
- Born: Jesse Edwards James; August 31, 1875; Nashville, Tennessee, United States
- Died: March 26, 1951 (aged 75); Los Angeles, California, United States
- Other name: Tim Edwards
- Occupation: Lawyer
- Spouse: Stella Frances McGowan
- Children: 4
- Parents: Jesse James; Zerelda Mimms

Jesse Edwards "Tim" James (August 31, 1875 – March 26, 1951) was the only surviving son of American outlaw Jesse Woodson James. He was born in Nashville, Tennessee, during the height of Jesse James' career as an outlaw. His mother was Zerelda.

== Personal life ==
James was named after his father, American outlaw Jesse James. He went by the name of Tim Edwards in his youth to conceal his relationship to his father. After his father's death in 1882, James and his family lived in Kansas City and were taken under the wing of Thomas T. Crittenden Jr., the son of Governor Thomas Theodore Crittenden, who had signed what would become the death warrant of the outlaw Jesse James. In 1898, James was arrested, and stood trial in 1899 for the robbery of a Missouri Pacific train. Defended by noted progressive lawyer Frank P. Walsh, James was acquitted of the robbery charge.

James married Stella Frances McGowan (February 27, 1882 – April 1, 1971) on January 24, 1900, in the parlor of her parents' home in Kansas City. The couple had four daughters.

The Jameses moved to Los Angeles, California, in the 1920s, where for a time they ran a restaurant called "The Jesse James Inn", and remained in California until his death in 1951.

== Career ==
Following his acquittal for train robbery, James wrote a book, Jesse James, My Father (ISBN 978-1-59107-044-3), which was published in 1899.

He owned a pawn shop in Kansas City while studying law. In 1906 James passed the Bar exam in Missouri, and opened a law practice in Kansas City.

He appeared in the 1921 film Jesse James Under the Black Flag with his sister Mary Susan James Barr (July 17, 1879 – October 11, 1935) and in Jesse James as the Outlaw.

He served as technical adviser on Paramount's 1927 biopic of his father titled Jesse James. This film starred cowboy hero Fred Thomson, who usually was a good guy to film audiences. Here Thomson plays Jesse James in a lighthearted way which many old timers who remembered Jesse James's murdering and robbing found inaccurate. The film proved to be unpopular.
