= Zerelda James =

Mother of outlaw Jesse James (1825–1911)

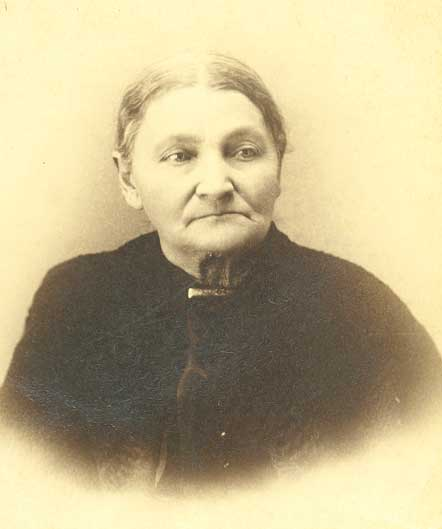
- Samuel c. 1900
- Born: Zerelda Elizabeth Cole; January 29, 1825; Woodford County, Kentucky, U.S.
- Died: February 10, 1911 (aged 86) near Oklahoma City, Oklahoma, U.S.
- Spouses: Robert S. James (m. 1841; died 1850) Benjamin Simms (m. 1852; sep. 1854) Reuben Samuel (m. 1855; died 1908)
- Children: 8 (incl. Frank and Jesse)

Zerelda Elizabeth Cole James Simms Samuel (January 29, 1825 – February 10, 1911) was the mother of famous outlaws Frank James and Jesse James.

== Biography ==
Cole was born to Otto and Ella Lindsay Cole on January 29, 1825, in Woodford County, Kentucky. She had one brother, younger than her by one year, named Jesse Richard Cole, who committed suicide by gunshot on 12 November 1895 at Kearney at the age of 67. He had been complaining of being sick for a few days, went to the chicken house carrying a pillow, laid down and fired a shot through his heart.

She was of English and Scottish descent. When Zerelda was a child, her father broke his neck in a riding accident, leaving her mother with two young children. They were taken in by her paternal grandfather, who owned a saloon. Later, her mother remarried Robert Thomason, a farmer. Zerelda did not get along with her new stepfather, Robert, so she went to live with some of her mother's relatives in Kentucky, where she attended a Catholic girls' school.

== First marriage ==
Zerelda Cole married Robert Sallee James on December 28, 1841, at the residence of her uncle, James Madison Lindsay, in Stamping Ground, Kentucky, when she was 16 years old. A college friend of Robert's officiated as the best man, and tobacco was given in bond. The two moved to the vicinity of Centerville (later Kearney, Missouri).

Robert James was a commercial hemp farmer, a slave owner, and a popular evangelical minister in the Baptist Church. Zerelda bore him four children.

- Alexander Franklin James (b. January 10, 1843 – d. February 18, 1915)
- Robert R. James (b. July 19, 1845 – d. August 21, 1845)
- Jesse Woodson James (b. September 5, 1847 – d. April 3, 1882)
- Susan Lavenia James (b. November 25, 1849 – d. March 3, 1889)

Shortly after the birth of his daughter, Susan, Robert James moved to California to preach to the gold miners, where he contracted either pneumonia, cholera or typhoid and died on (according to tradition) August 18, 1850. His grave has never been officially identified, and no marker exists for him today. There is a much-disputed story that, in later years, Jesse went looking for his father's grave.

== Second marriage ==
Benjamin A. Simms was a wealthy neighbour farmer who was born around 1800 in Virginia, lived in Clinton County, Missouri and left an estate there. He was the brother of John H. Simms, who served in the War of 1812. He was drafted around July 1814 to serve the same war in the Regiment of Virginia Militia, and served through December as a private.

On 11 December 1823 he married Mary Ann George in Woodford County, Kentucky, before moving to Missouri. Mary died and he married the widowed Zerelda James on September 25, 1852. The marriage proved unhappy, primarily because Simms disliked Frank James and Jesse James, to whom he was reportedly cruel and abusive. "The chief trouble arose from the fact that her three little children, Frank Jesse, and Susie, whom she had always humored and indulged, gave their old step-father no end of annoyance". Benjamin demanded the children sent away, Zerelda refused and left Simms because "he was mean to her sons". He was killed accidentally in Clay County on January 2, 1854, when his horse threw him.

== Third marriage ==
Zerelda was married a third time to Dr. Reuben Samuel (b. January 1829 – d. March 1, 1908), on September 25, 1855. Samuel has been described as "a quiet, passive man...standing in the shadow of his outspoken, forceful wife". Dr. Reuben Samuel and Zerelda Samuel had four children:

- Sarah Louisa Samuel (b. April 7, 1858 – d. July 14, 1921)
- John Thomas Samuel (b. December 25, 1861 – d. March 15, 1934)
- Fanny Quantrill Samuel (b. October 18, 1863 – d. May 3, 1922)
- Archie Peyton Samuel (b. July 26, 1866 – d. January 26, 1875)

In historical documents, it is not unusual to come across spelling variations in names, so "Samuel" or "Samuels" are considered interchangeable. However, the spelling "Samuel" is attested by birth records, family gravestones, and neighbor Homer Croy.

== Pinkerton Raid ==
The Pinkerton Agency's founder and leader, Allan Pinkerton, attempted to capture the James brothers. On the night of January 25, 1875, he staged a raid on the homestead. Detectives threw an incendiary device into the house; it exploded, killing James's young half-brother Archie (named for Archie Clement) and blowing off the right arm of Zerelda Samuel. Afterwards, Pinkerton denied that the raid's intent was arson, but biographer Ted Yeatman located a letter by Pinkerton in the Library of Congress in which Pinkerton declared his intention to "burn the house down."

== Post Jesse: The James Farm Tour ==
Because of his fame, many people wanted to visit the place where Jesse James grew up.

Zerelda charged for the tour, and the visitors were taken on a tour of the farmhouse including a vivid account of the Pinkerton Raid in January. The fireplace does not bear burn marks but there is evidence of which floor boards were salvaged and which were replaced when the repairs were made as compensation by Pinkerton to Mrs. James for the death of her son and injury to herself.

The tour culminated at the grave of Jesse, who was originally buried in the front yard outside Zerelda's bedroom window so when she slept at night, she had a clear, unobstructed view of his grave. Zerelda was worried that someone would come and take him so she had him buried an extra few feet down than the standard six. For an extra few coins visitors were allowed to scoop up the "authentic" pebbles from the grave. Zerelda replenished them from the stream where the boys used to play. Years later when Jesse's wife, also named Zerelda, died, his mother had Jesse reburied alongside his wife at Mount Olivet in Kearney, MO. She further would play on the sympathies of her visitors by offering to sell old, rusted, often inoperable guns that she said belonged to Jesse before he died, which in reality she had bought second-hand, leading to a proliferation of people claiming to and sincerely believing that they owned a gun that had once belonged to Jesse James.

== Death ==
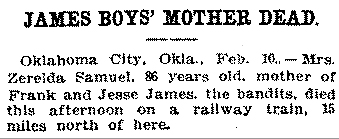
Obituary from the Washington Post; February 11, 1911

Zerelda died in 1911 in the Burlington carriage on a train traveling to San Francisco, California of a heart ailment (some 20 miles outside of Oklahoma City). She was 86 years old and was buried next to Reuben Samuel, her third husband, and sons Jesse and Archie at Mount Olivet Cemetery, Clay County, Missouri.

== Popular culture ==
- Mamaw by Susan M. Dodd, a fictional book about Zerelda.
- Fran Ryan played Zerelda in the 1980 film The Long Riders, which was a more or less accurate film about the last years of the James-Younger gang after the Civil War
- Jane Darwell played Zerelda in the 1939 movie starring Tyrone Power, which has her character dying at the film's beginning, while in reality she outlived her son by nearly 30 years.
- Mentioned in the Tom Waits song "Diamond in Your Mind"
- The actress Ann Doran portrayed Zerelda in the ABC television series The Legend of Jesse James (1965–1966). Christopher Jones and Allen Case played Jesse and Frank James, respectively.
- Kathy Bates portrayed Zerelda in the 2001 film American Outlaws, which has her character dying early in the movie to the Pinkerton raid explosion that actually only blew off her arm.

== Timeline ==
- 1825 Birth on January 29
- 1850 Death of Robert Sallee James, her first husband
- 1854 Death of Benjamin Simms, her second husband
- 1875 Death of son Archie Samuel
- 1882 Death of son Jesse James
- 1900 US Census in Clay County, Missouri
- 1908 Death of Reuben Samuel, her third husband
- 1911 Death in Oklahoma City, Oklahoma, on February 10
- 1915 Death of son Frank James

== Bibliography ==
- Chappell, Wilma; Hall, William Kearney (1969). The Simms Family of Stafford County, Virginia: A Record of the Descendants of Three Brothers ... Richard Simms (1752-1850) of Clay County, Missouri; Presley Simms (ca. 1754-1852) of Montgomery County, Indiana; Rhodam Sims (1756-1853) of Ralls County, Missouri. W.K. Hall.
- Johnson, David D. (2008). John Ringo, King of the Cowboys: His Life and Times from the Hoo Doo War to Tombstone. University of North Texas Press. pp. 5–6. ISBN 9781574412437.
- Settle, William A. Jr, Jesse James Was His Name, or, Fact and Fiction Concerning the Careers of the Notorious James Brothers of Missouri (University of Nebraska Press, 1977)
- Steele, Phillip W., Jesse and Frank James: The Family History (Pelican Publishing, 1987)
- Stiles, T.J., Jesse James: Last Rebel of the Civil War (Alfred A. Knopf, 2002)
- Yeatman, Ted P., Frank and Jesse James: The Story Behind the Legend (Cumberland House, 2001)
