= Frank James =

American outlaw, Confederate guerrilla, and train robber

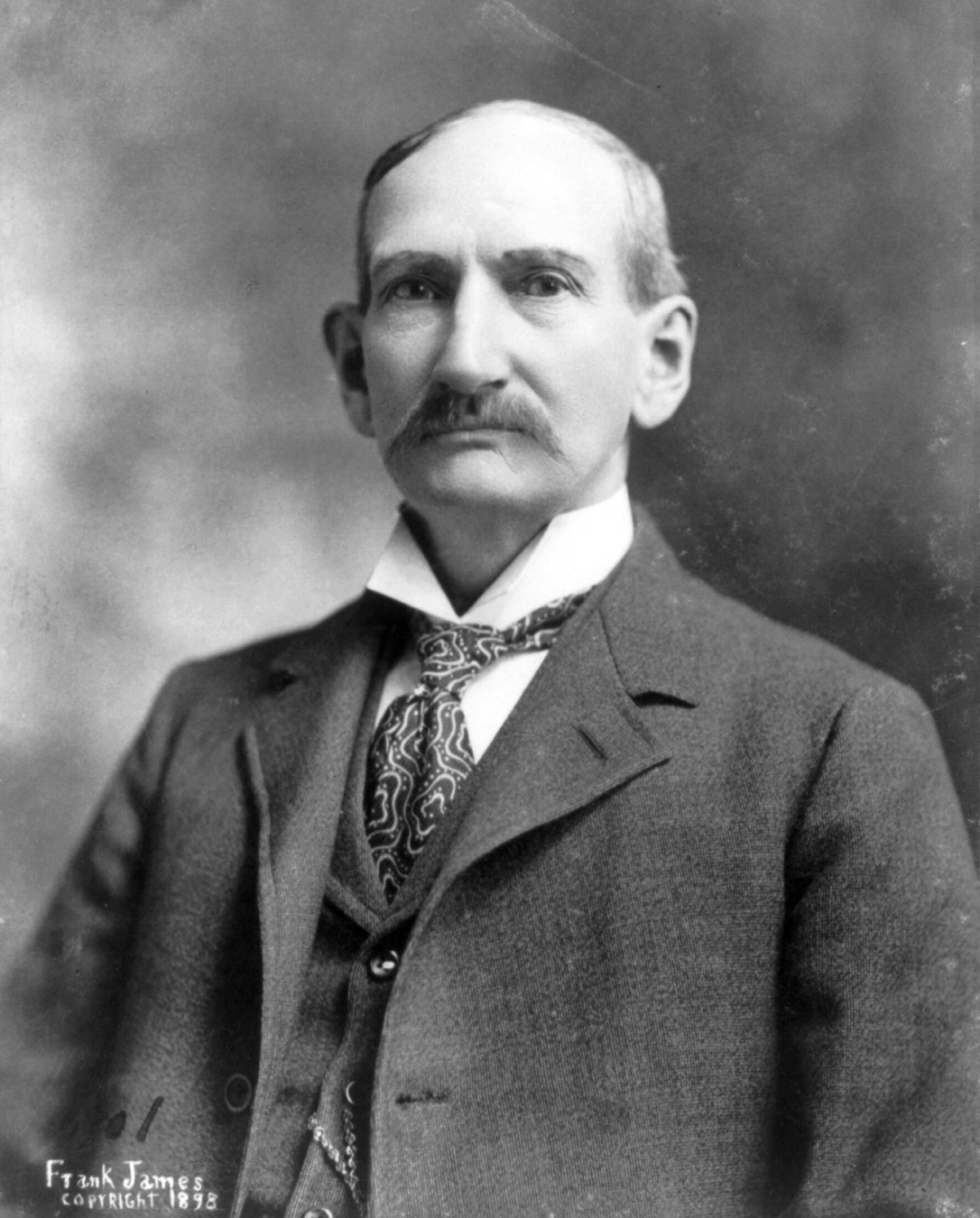
- James in 1898
- Born: Alexander Franklin James; January 10, 1843; Kearney, Missouri, U.S.
- Died: February 18, 1915 (aged 72); Kearney, Missouri, U.S.
- Spouse: Annie Ralston James
- Children: 1

Alexander Franklin James (January 10, 1843 – February 18, 1915) was a Confederate soldier and guerrilla; who became an outlaw in the post-Civil War period. The older brother of outlaw Jesse James, Frank was also part of the James–Younger Gang.

== Childhood ==
James was born in Kearney, Missouri, to Baptist minister Reverend Robert Sallee James and his wife Zerelda (Cole) James. The couple came from Kentucky. He was of English, Welsh and Scottish descent. Frank was the oldest of three children. His father died in 1850 and his mother remarried Benjamin Simms in 1852. After his death, she married a third time to Dr. Reuben Samuel in 1855, when Frank was 13 years old. As a child, James showed interest in his late father's sizable library, especially the works of William Shakespeare. Census records show that James attended school regularly, and he reportedly wanted to become a teacher.

== Civil War ==
The American Civil War began in 1861, when James was eighteen years old. The secessionists in Missouri, including Governor Claiborne Fox Jackson, attempted to drive the Union army out of the state but were eventually defeated. The James family was from the heavily Confederate western portion of the state. On September 13, 1861, the Missouri State Guard, including private Frank James, besieged Lexington, Missouri. James fell ill and was left behind when the Confederate forces retreated. He surrendered to the Union troops, was paroled, and was allowed to return home. On his arrival, however, he was arrested by the local pro-Union militia and was forced to sign an oath of allegiance to the Union.

After the withdrawal of regular Confederate troops in the fall of 1861, a bitter guerrilla conflict soon began between bands of pro-Confederate irregulars (commonly known as bushwhackers) and the Union homeguards. By early 1863, Frank, ignoring his parole and oath of allegiance, had joined the guerrilla band of Fernando Scott, a former saddler. He soon switched to the more active command led by William Clarke Quantrill.

Union militiamen searching for Fernando Scott raided the Samuel farm and hanged Dr. Reuben Samuel (though not fatally), Frank's stepfather, torturing him to reveal the location of the guerrillas. Shortly afterward, Frank took part with Quantrill's company in the August 21, 1863, Lawrence Massacre where approximately 200 mostly unarmed civilians were killed.

Frank James was paroled July 27, 1865 in Nelson County, Kentucky. There is a report that after his parole, Frank was involved in a gunfight in Brandenburg, Kentucky with four soldiers that resulted in two soldiers killed, one wounded, and Frank wounded in the hip. However, there is an alternative account that claims in the autumn of 1865, Frank, who was in Kentucky going to Missouri, was suspected of stealing horses in Ohio and that Frank shot two members of a posse and escaped.

== Outlaw, arrest and retirement ==
During his years as a bandit, James was involved in at least four robberies between 1868 and 1876 that resulted in the deaths of bank employees or citizens. The most famous incident was the disastrous Northfield, Minnesota raid on September 7, 1876, that ended with the death or capture of most of the gang.

Five months after the killing of his brother Jesse in 1882, Frank James boarded a train to Jefferson City, Missouri, where he had an appointment with the governor in the state capital. Placing his holster in Governor Crittenden's hands, he explained,

'I have been hunted for twenty-one years, have literally lived in the saddle, have never known a day of perfect peace. It was one long, anxious, inexorable, eternal vigil.' He then ended his statement by saying, 'Governor, I haven't let another man touch my gun since 1861.'

Accounts say that James surrendered with the understanding that he would not be extradited to Northfield, Minnesota.

He was tried for only two of the robberies/murders: one in Gallatin, Missouri, for the July 15, 1881, robbery of the Rock Island Line train at Winston, Missouri, in which the train engineer and a passenger were killed, and the other in Huntsville, Alabama, for the March 11, 1881, robbery of a United States Army Corps of Engineers payroll at Muscle Shoals, Alabama. Among others, former Confederate General Joseph Orville Shelby testified on James's behalf in the Missouri trial. He was acquitted in both Missouri and Alabama. Missouri accepted legal jurisdiction over him for other charges, but they never came to trial. He was never extradited to Minnesota for his connection with the Northfield Raid.

His New York Times obituary summarized his arrest and acquittal:

In 1882 ... Frank James surrendered in Jefferson City, Missouri. After his surrender James was taken to Independence, Missouri, where he was held in jail three weeks, and later to Gallatin, where he remained in jail a year awaiting trial. Finally James was acquitted and went to Oklahoma to live with his mother. He never was in the penitentiary and never was convicted of any of the charges against him.

In the last thirty years of his life, James worked a variety of jobs, including shoe salesman in Nevada, Missouri and then burlesque theater ticket taker in St. Louis. One of the theater's spins to attract patrons was their use of the phrase "Come get your ticket punched by the legendary Frank James." He also served as an AT&T telegraph operator in St. Joseph, Missouri. James took up the lecture circuit, while residing in Sherman, Texas. In 1902, former Missourian Sam Hildreth, a leading thoroughbred horse trainer and owner, hired James as the betting commissioner at the Fair Grounds Race Track, in New Orleans. He returned to the North Texas area where he was a shoe salesman at Sanger Brothers in Dallas. The Tacoma Times reported in July, 1914, that he was picking berries at a local ranch in Washington state, and planned to buy a farm nearby. He was also part of a Chicago investment group which purchased the Fletcher Terrell's Buckskin Bill's Wild West Show, third in size after the Buffalo Bill and Pawnee Bill shows.

In his final years, James returned to the James Farm, giving tours for the sum of 25 cents. He died there at age 72 on February 18, 1915. He left behind his wife Annie Ralston James and one son.

== Portrayals ==
- 1939, Henry Fonda in the film Jesse James as well as the 1940 sequel The Return of Frank James
- 1941, Al Taylor in Jesse James at Bay
- 1946, Tom Tyler in the film Badman's Territory
- 1949, Tom Tyler in I Shot Jesse James, an account from Robert Ford's viewpoint, and the first western directed by Samuel Fuller
- 1950, Richard Long in Kansas Raiders, about his time spent with Quantrill's Raiders
- 1954, Richard Travis in Stories of the Century
- 1957, Jeffrey Hunter in The True Story of Jesse James
- 1959, Jim Davis in Alias Jesse James
- 1960, Robert Dix in Young Jesse James
- 1965–66, Allen Case in The Legend of Jesse James
- 1972, John Pierce in The Great Northfield Minnesota Raid
- 1977, John Bennett Perry in an episode of Little House on the Prairie
- 1980, Stacy Keach in The Long Riders, which featured four sets of real brothers playing sets of brothers in the gang
- 1980, country singer Johnny Cash in the concept album, The Legend of Jesse James
- 1984, Nick Benedict in an episode of The Dukes of Hazzard
- 1986, country singer Johnny Cash in The Last Days of Frank and Jesse James, directed by William A. Graham
- 1992, Jamie Walters in the Western TV show The Young Riders
- 1994, Bill Paxton in Frank & Jesse
- 1995, Leonard Nimoy in the made-for-TV movie Bonanza: Under Attack
- 2001, Gabriel Macht in American Outlaws
- 2007, Sam Shepard in The Assassination of Jesse James by the Coward Robert Ford
- 2010, an uncredited actor in True Grit, sitting with Cole Younger at the Wild West Show
- 2018, Robert Carradine in Bill Tilghman and the Outlaws
