= Robert S. James =

American Baptist minister

Robert James
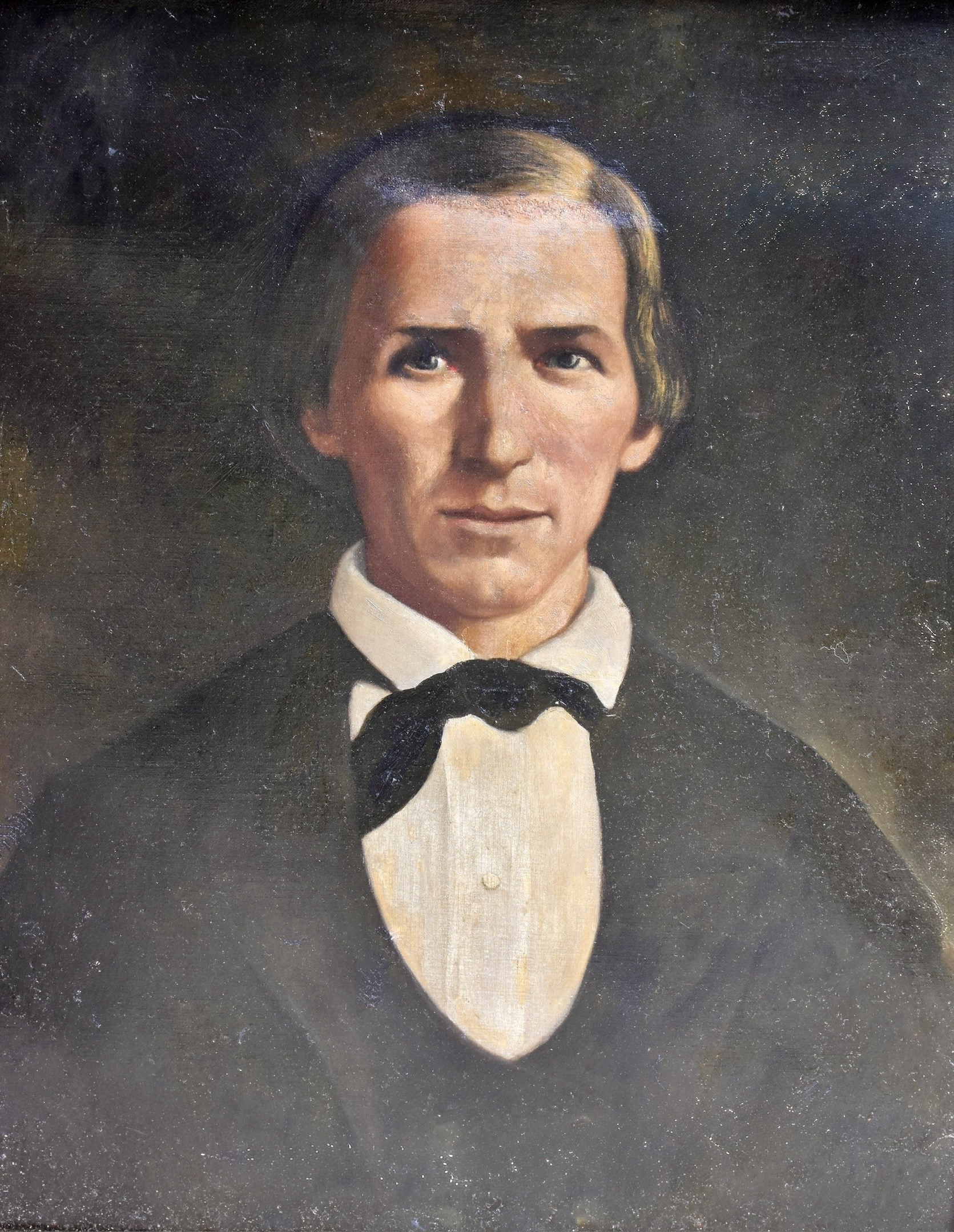
- Born: Robert Salle James; July 17, 1818; Lickskillet, Logan County, Kentucky, US
- Died: August 18, 1850 (aged 32); Placerville, California, US
- Occupations: Farmer, Baptist preacher
- Spouse: Zerelda James (m. 1841)
- Children: 4 (incl. Frank and Jesse)

Rev. Robert Salle James (July 17, 1818 – August 18, 1850) was an American Baptist minister and one of the founders of William Jewell College in 1849 in Liberty, Missouri. He was the father of the outlaws Frank and Jesse James.

== Biography ==
Robert Salle James was born near Big Whippoorwill Creek at Lickskillet, Logan County, Kentucky. He was the son of John M. James (1775–1827) and Mary "Polly" James (née Poor). Through his mother Robert was a descendant of Jamestowne Society qualifying ancestor Dr. John Woodson. Woodson, an Oxford-educated surgeon, arrived at Jamestown, Virginia in April 1619 from Devon in the service of Colony of Virginia Governor George Yeardley. Robert's maternal grandfather Robert Poor served as a Cornet (military rank) in the Revolutionary War.

Robert married Zerelda Cole on December 28, 1841. His children were Alexander Franklin, Robert, Jesse and Susan Lavenia. He attended Georgetown College in Georgetown, Kentucky, graduating in 1843 with honors and a Bachelor of Arts. The family soon relocated to Clay County, Missouri, where Zerelda's mother and stepfather were living, but Robert commuted back to Kentucky and eventually received a Master of Arts from Georgetown. He was considered a gifted student and a skilled orator.

James was a noted revivalist. He was among the founders of William Jewell College in 1849. In April 1850, James left his family for California to visit his brother Drury Woodson James, who had already relocated to the state. He also planned to prospect for gold and preach to the crowds of goldminers during the California gold rush. Shortly after arriving in California in August 1850, he contracted cholera and died on August 18, 1850, in the Hangtown Gold Camp, later known as Placerville. He was buried there in an unmarked grave. Probate records show that at his death he owned six slaves and was a commercial hemp farmer.

James's death left his family saddled with debts and many of his possessions, including one of the slaves, were auctioned off to pay them. His widow Zerelda married Benjamin Simms, a wealthy farmer, on September 30, 1852. This, however, did not last and they soon separated, with Zerelda marrying a third time to a country doctor.
