= Jesse James =

American outlaw (1847–1882)

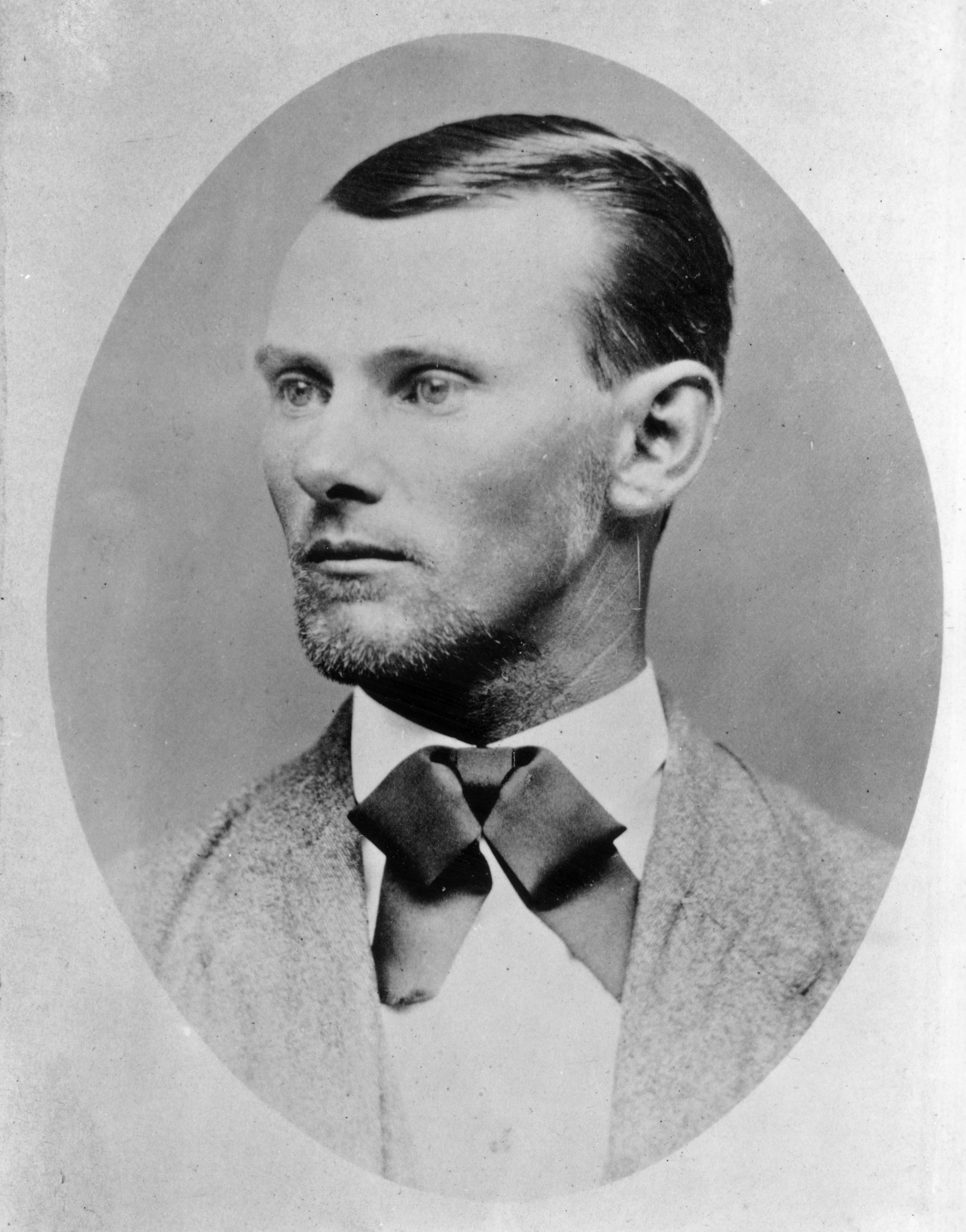
- James c. 1875 in Nebraska City
- Born: Jesse Woodson James; September 5, 1847 near Kearney, Missouri, U.S.
- Died: April 3, 1882 (aged 34); St. Joseph, Missouri, U.S.
- Cause of death: Gunshot wound to the head
- Years active: 1866–1882
- Spouse: Zerelda Mimms (m. 1874)
- Children: 4, including Jesse E.
- Parents: Robert S. James (father); Zerelda Cole James (mother)
- Relatives: Frank James (brother); Wood Hite (cousin)

Signature
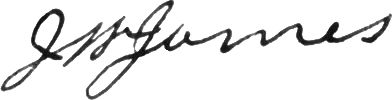

Jesse Woodson James (September 5, 1847 – April 3, 1882) was an American outlaw, bank and train robber, guerrilla and leader of the James–Younger Gang. Raised a Southern sympathizer in the "Little Dixie" area of Missouri, James and his brother Frank joined pro-Confederate guerrillas known as "bushwhackers" operating in Missouri and Kansas during the American Civil War. As followers of William Quantrill and "Bloody Bill" Anderson, they were accused of committing atrocities against Union soldiers and civilian abolitionists, including the Centralia Massacre in 1864.

After the war, as members of various gangs of outlaws, the James brothers robbed banks, stagecoaches and trains across the Midwest, gaining national fame and often popular sympathy despite the brutality of their crimes. The brothers were most active as members of their own gang from about 1866 until 1876, when as a result of their attempted robbery of a bank in Northfield, Minnesota, several members of the gang were captured or killed. They continued in crime for several years afterward, recruiting new members, but came under increasing pressure from law enforcement seeking to bring them to justice. On April 3, 1882, Jesse James was shot and killed by Robert Ford, a new recruit to the gang who hoped to collect a reward on James' head and a promised amnesty for his previous crimes. Already a celebrity in life, James became a legendary figure of the Wild West after his death.

Popular portrayals of James as an embodiment of Robin Hood, robbing from the rich and giving to the poor, are a case of romantic revisionism as there is no evidence his gang shared any loot from their robberies with anyone outside their network. Scholars and historians have characterized James as one of many criminals inspired by the regional insurgencies of ex-Confederates following the Civil War, rather than as a manifestation of alleged economic justice or of frontier lawlessness. James continues to be one of the most famous figures from the era, and his life has been dramatized and memorialized numerous times in media.

== Early life ==
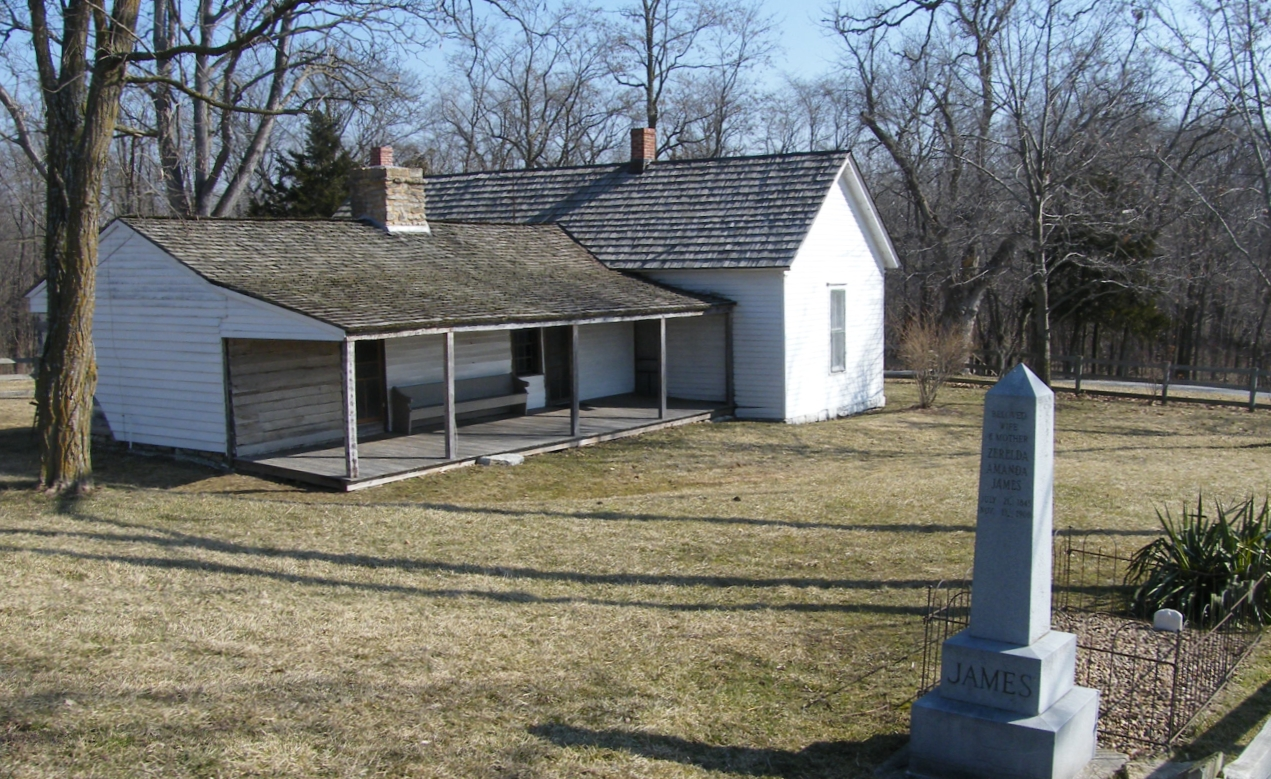
James' farm in Kearney, Missouri, pictured in March 2010

Jesse Woodson James was born on September 5, 1847, in Clay County, Missouri, near the site of present-day Kearney. This area of Missouri was largely settled by people from the Upper South, especially Kentucky and Tennessee, and became known as "Little Dixie" for this reason. James had two full siblings: his elder brother, Alexander Franklin "Frank" James, and a younger sister, Susan Lavenia James. He was of English and Scottish descent. Through his great-great-grandmother, Rachel Dorsey, James was a descendant of Edward I Longshanks. His father, Robert S. James, farmed commercial hemp in Kentucky and was a Baptist minister before coming to Missouri. After he married, he migrated to Bradford, Missouri, and helped found William Jewell College in the city of Liberty. He held six slaves and more than 100 acres (0.40 km^{2}) of farmland.

James' father traveled to California during the Gold Rush to minister to those searching for gold; he died there when James was three years old. After his death, his widow Zerelda remarried twice, first to Benjamin Simms in 1852 and then in 1855 to Dr. Reuben Samuel, who moved into the James family home. Jesse's mother and Samuel had four children together: Sarah Louisa, John Thomas, Fannie Quantrell and Archie Peyton Samuel. Zerelda and Samuel acquired a total of seven slaves, who served mainly as farmhands in tobacco cultivation.

== Historical context ==
The approach of the American Civil War loomed large in the James–Samuel household. Missouri was a border state, sharing characteristics of both North and South, but 75% of the population was from the South or other border states. Clay County in particular was strongly influenced by the Southern culture of its rural pioneer families. Farmers raised the same crops and livestock as in the areas from which they had migrated. They brought slaves with them and purchased more according to their needs. The county counted more slaveholders and more slaves than most other regions of the state; in Missouri as a whole, slaves accounted for only ten percent of the population, but in Clay County, they constituted twenty-five percent. Aside from slavery, the culture of Little Dixie was Southern in other ways as well, influencing how the population acted during and for a period of time after the war.

After the passage of the Kansas–Nebraska Act in 1854, Clay County became the scene of great turmoil as the question of whether slavery would be expanded into the neighboring Kansas Territory bred tension and hostility. Many people from Missouri migrated to Kansas to try to influence its future. Much of the dramatic build-up to the war centered on the violence that erupted on the Kansas–Missouri border between pro- and anti-slavery militias.

== American Civil War ==
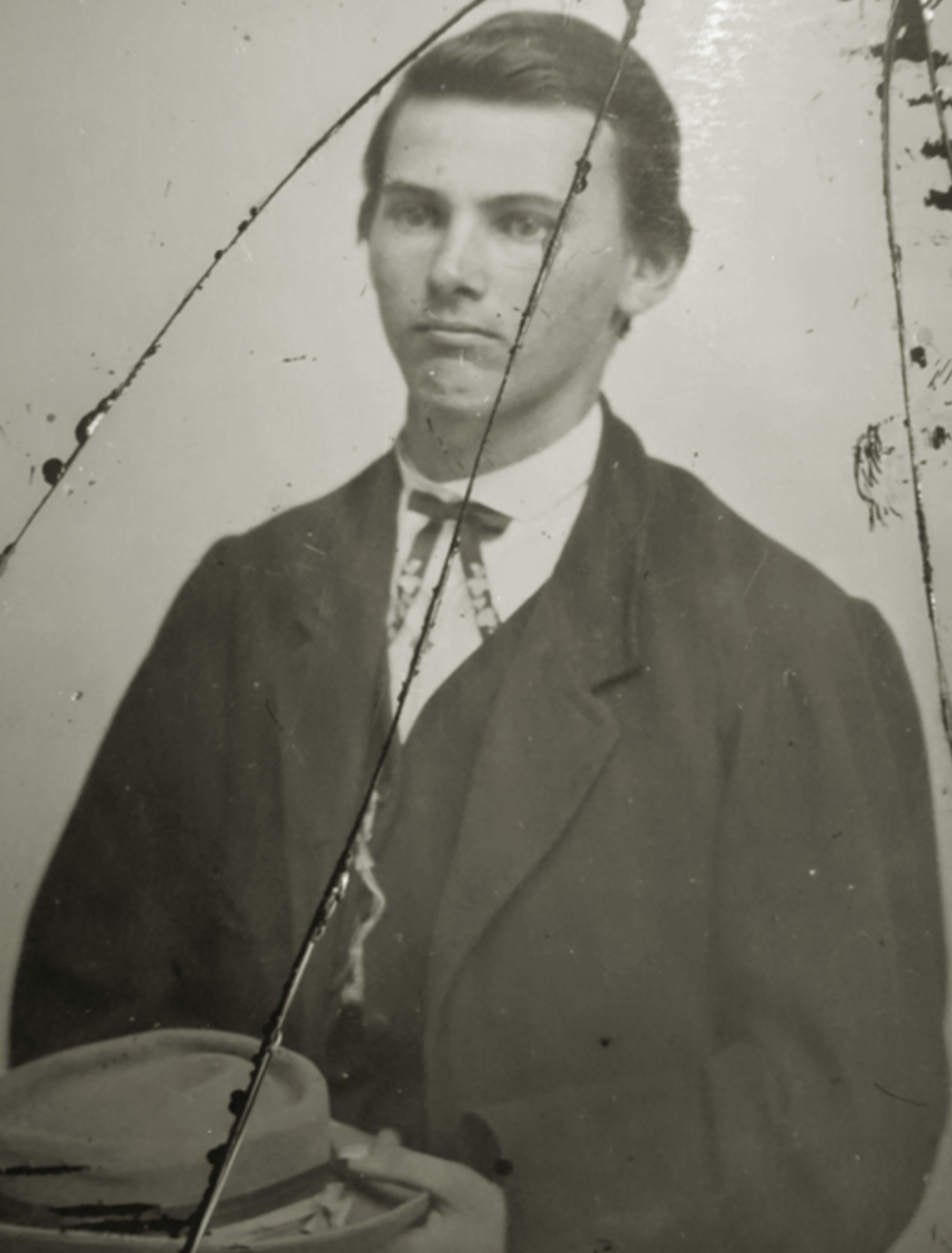
Ambrotype of James, c. 1862

After a series of campaigns and battles between conventional armies in 1861, guerrilla warfare gripped Missouri, waged between secessionist "bushwhackers" and Union forces, which largely consisted of local militias known as "jayhawkers". A bitter conflict ensued, resulting in an escalating cycle of atrocities committed by both sides. Confederate guerrillas murdered civilian Unionists, executed prisoners and scalped the dead. The Union presence enforced martial law with raids on homes, arrests of civilians, summary executions and banishment of Confederate sympathizers from the state.

The James–Samuel family sided with the Confederates at the outbreak of war. Frank James joined a local company recruited for the secessionist Drew Lobbs Army, and fought at the Battle of Wilson's Creek in August 1861. He fell ill and returned home soon afterward. In 1863, Frank was identified as a member of a guerrilla squad that operated in Clay County. In May of that year, a Union militia company raided the James–Samuel farm looking for the group. They tortured Reuben Samuel by briefly hanging him from a tree. According to legend, they lashed young Jesse.

=== Quantrill's Raiders ===
Frank eluded capture and was believed to have joined the guerrilla organization led by William C. Quantrill known as Quantrill's Raiders. It is thought that he took part in the notorious massacre of some two hundred men and boys in Lawrence, Kansas, an abolitionist stronghold. Frank followed Quantrill to Sherman, Texas, over the winter of 1863–1864. In the spring he returned in a squad commanded by Fletch Taylor. After they arrived in Clay County, sixteen-year-old Jesse joined his brother in Taylor's group.

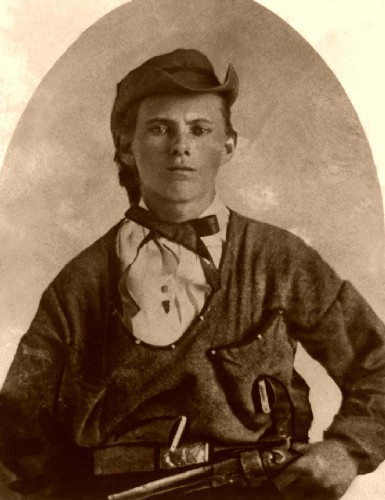
Copy of an ambrotype taken of Jesse James in Platte City on July 10, 1864

Taylor was severely wounded in the summer of 1864, losing his right arm to a shotgun blast. The James brothers then joined the bushwhacker group led by William "Bloody Bill" Anderson. Jesse suffered a serious wound to the chest that summer. The Clay County provost marshal reported that both brothers took part in the Centralia Massacre in September, in which guerrillas stopped a train carrying unarmed Union Army soldiers returning home from duty and killed or wounded some twenty-two of them; the guerrillas scalped and dismembered some of the dead. The guerrillas also ambushed and defeated a pursuing regiment of Major A. V. E. Johnson's Union troops, killing all who tried to surrender, who numbered more than 100. Frank later identified Jesse as a member of the band who had fatally shot Major Johnson.

As a result of the James brothers' activities, Union military authorities forced their family to leave Clay County. Though ordered to move South beyond Union lines, they moved north across the nearby state border into Nebraska Territory. After Anderson was killed in an ambush in October, the James brothers separated. Frank followed Quantrill into Kentucky, while Jesse went to Texas under the command of Archie Clement, one of Anderson's lieutenants. He is known to have returned to Missouri in the spring. At the age of 17, Jesse suffered the second of two life-threatening chest wounds when he was shot while trying to surrender after Clement's guerillas ran into a Union cavalry patrol near Lexington, Missouri.

== After the Civil War ==
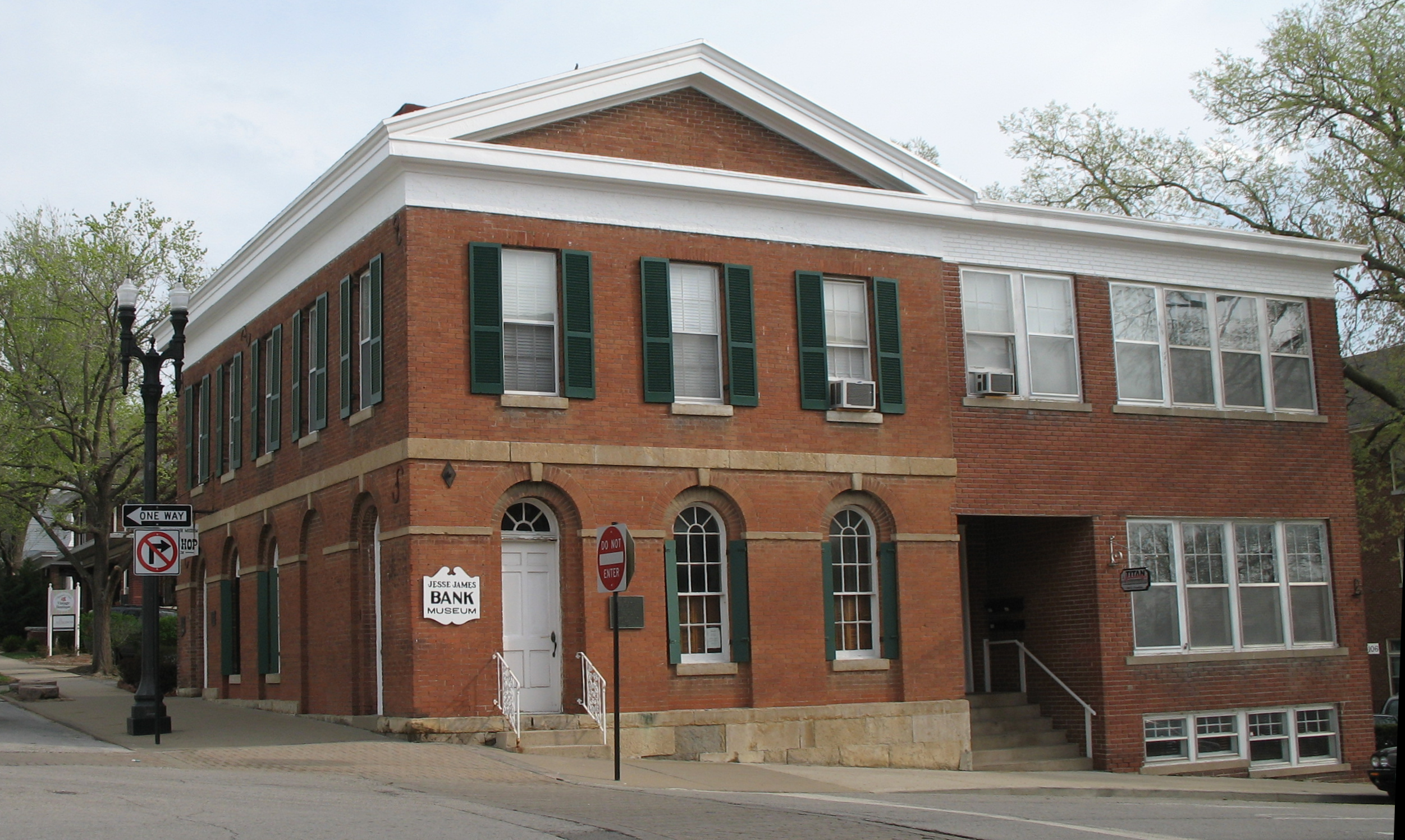
Clay County Savings in Liberty, Missouri

At the end of the Civil War, Missouri remained deeply divided. The conflict split the population into three bitterly opposed factions: anti-slavery Unionists identified with the Republican Party; segregationist conservative Unionists identified with the Democratic Party; and pro-slavery, ex-Confederate secessionists, many of whom were also allied with the Democrats, especially in the southern part of the state.

The Republican-dominated Reconstruction legislature passed a new state constitution that freed Missouri's slaves. It temporarily excluded former Confederates from voting, serving on juries, becoming corporate officers or preaching from church pulpits. The atmosphere was volatile, with widespread clashes between individuals and between armed gangs of veterans from both sides of the war.

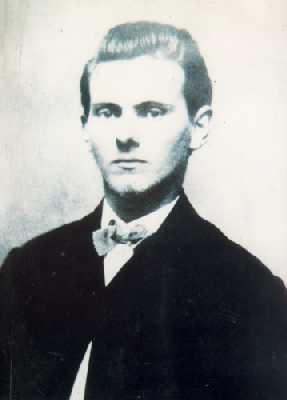
James in Greenville in 1869

Jesse recovered from his chest wound at his uncle's boardinghouse in Harlem, Missouri (north across the Missouri River from the City of Kansas' River Quay [changed to Kansas City in 1889]). He was tended to by his first cousin, Zerelda "Zee" Mimms, named after Jesse's mother. Jesse and his cousin began a nine-year courtship that culminated in their marriage.

Meanwhile, Clement kept his bushwhacker gang together and began to harass Republican authorities. These men were the likely culprits in the first daylight armed bank robbery in the United States during peacetime, the robbery of the Clay County Savings Association in the town of Liberty, Missouri, on February 13, 1866. The bank was owned by former Republican militia officers who had recently conducted the first Republican rally in Clay County's history. During the gang's escape from the town, an innocent bystander, seventeen-year-old George C. "Jolly" Wymore, a student at William Jewell College, was shot dead on the street.

It remains unclear whether the James brothers took part in the Clay County robbery. After Jesse and Frank successfully conducted other robberies and became legendary, some observers retroactively credited them with being the leaders of the robbery. Others have argued that Jesse was at the time still bedridden and could not have participated. No evidence has been found that connects either brother to the crime or that conclusively rules them out. On June 13, 1866, in Jackson County, Missouri, the gang freed two jailed members of Quantrill's gang, killing the jailer in the effort. Historians believe that the James brothers were involved in this crime.

Local violence continued to increase in Missouri; Governor Thomas Clement Fletcher had recently ordered a company of militia into Johnson County to suppress guerrilla activity. Clement continued his career of crime and harassment of the Republican government, to the extent of occupying the town of Lexington, Missouri, on election day in 1866. Shortly afterward, the state militia shot Clement dead. James wrote about this death with bitterness a decade later.

The survivors of Clement's gang continued to conduct bank robberies over the next two years, though their numbers dwindled through arrests, gunfights and lynchings. While they later tried to justify robbing the banks, most of their targets were small, local banks based on local capital and the robberies only penalized the locals they claimed to support. On May 23, 1867, for example, the gang robbed a bank in Richmond, Missouri, during which they killed the mayor and two others. It remains uncertain whether either of the James brothers took part, although an eyewitness who knew the brothers told a newspaper seven years later "positively and emphatically that he recognized Jesse and Frank James... among the robbers." In 1868, the brothers allegedly joined Cole Younger in robbing a bank in Russellville, Kentucky.

Jesse James did not become well known until December 7, 1869, when he (and most likely Frank) robbed the Daviess County Savings Association in Gallatin, Missouri. The robbery netted little money. Jesse is believed to have shot and killed the cashier, Captain John Sheets, mistakenly believing him to be Samuel P. Cox, the militia officer who had killed "Bloody Bill" Anderson during the Civil War. James claimed he was taking revenge, and the daring escape he and Frank made through the middle of a posse shortly afterward attracted newspaper coverage for the first time. An 1882 history of Daviess County said, "The history of Daviess County has no blacker crime in its pages than the murder of John W. Sheets."

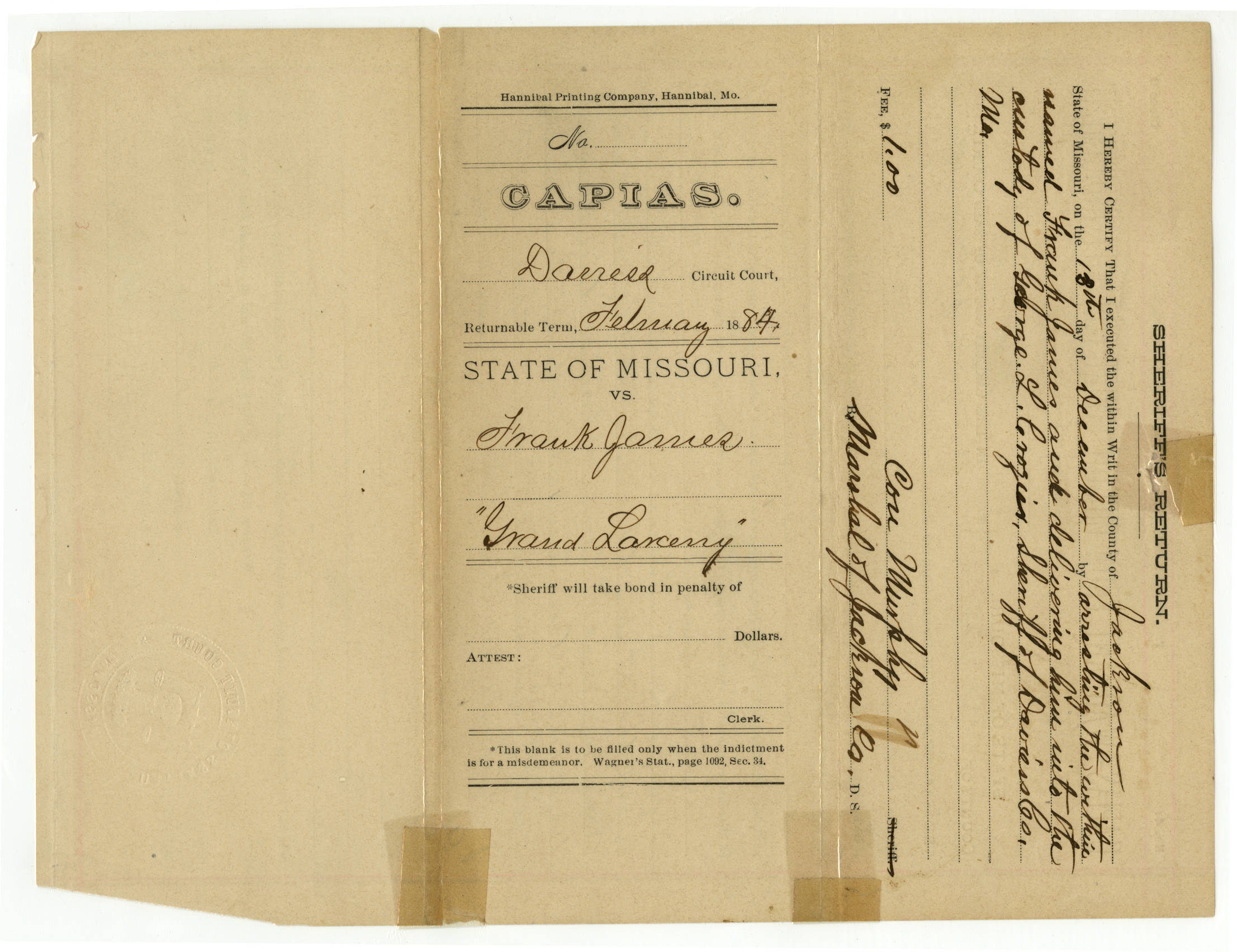
State of Missouri vs. Frank & Jesse James including indictment; capias to Clay & Jackson Counties; sheriff's returns; warrant to any sheriff or marshall of the Criminal Court in Missouri. Courtesy of the Missouri State Archives.

The only known civil case involving the James brothers was filed in the Common Pleas Court of Daviess County in 1870. In the case, Daniel Smoote asked for $223.50 from Frank and Jesse James to replace a horse, saddle and bridle stolen as they fled the Gallatin robbery. The brothers denied the charges, saying they were not in Daviess County on the day the robbery occurred. They failed to appear in court, and Smoote won his case against them. It is unlikely that he ever collected the money due.

The Gallatin robbery marked the emergence of Jesse as the most famous survivor of the former Confederate bushwhackers. It was the first time he was publicly labeled an "outlaw"; Missouri Governor Thomas T. Crittenden set a reward for his capture. This was the beginning of an alliance between James and John Newman Edwards, editor and founder of the Kansas City Times. Edwards, a former Confederate cavalryman, was campaigning to return former secessionists to power in Missouri. Six months after the Gallatin robbery, he published the first of many letters from Jesse asserting his innocence. Jesse also submitted a formal proof of alibi, consisting of sworn affidavits from neighbors and family members placing him in Kearney on the evening of the robbery. Over time, the letters gradually became more political in tone, with Jesse denouncing the Republicans and expressing pride in his Confederate loyalties. Together with Edwards' admiring editorials, the letters helped Jesse become a symbol of Confederate defiance of federal Reconstruction policy. Jesse's initiative in creating his rising public profile is debated by historians and biographers. The high tensions in politics accompanied his outlaw career and enhanced his notoriety.

== James–Younger Gang ==
Meanwhile, the James brothers joined with Younger and his brothers John, Jim and Bob, as well as Clell Miller and other former Confederates, to form what came to be known as the James–Younger Gang. With Jesse as the most public face of the gang (though with operational leadership likely shared among the group), the gang carried out a string of robberies from Minnesota to Texas, and from Kansas to West Virginia. They robbed banks, stagecoaches and a fair in Kansas City, Missouri, often carrying out their crimes in front of crowds and even hamming it up for the bystanders.

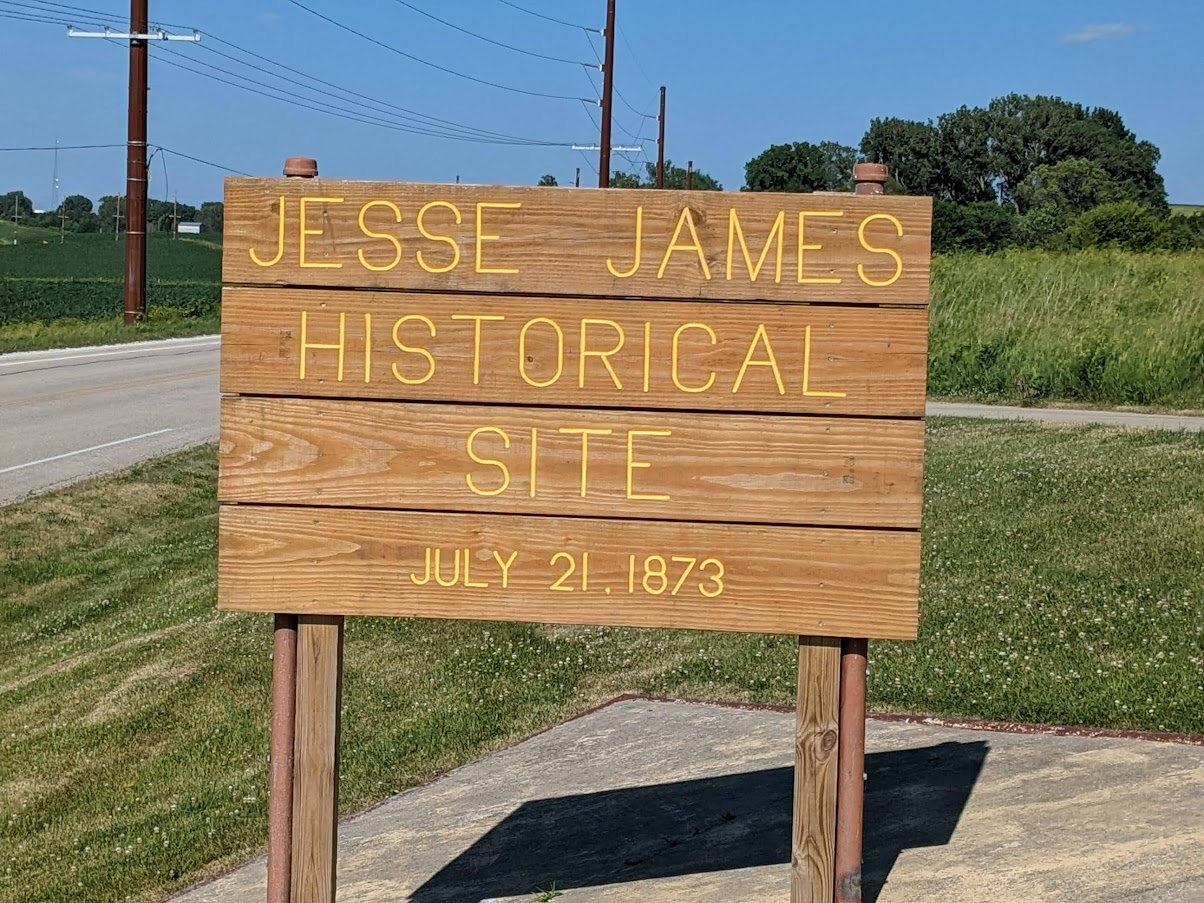
Jesse James Historic Site sign, identifying the location of the Adair, Iowa train robbery

On July 21, 1873, the James–Younger gang turned to train robbery, derailing a Rock Island Line train west of Adair, Iowa, and stealing approximately $3,000 (equivalent to $81,000 in 2025). For this, they wore Ku Klux Klan masks. By this time, the Klan had been suppressed in the South by President Ulysses S. Grant's use of the Enforcement Acts. Former rebels attacked the railroads as symbols of threatening centralization.

The gang's later train robberies had a lighter touch. The gang held up passengers only twice, choosing in all other incidents to take only the contents of the express safe in the baggage car. Edwards made sure to highlight such techniques when creating an image of Jesse as a kind of Robin Hood. Despite public sentiment toward the gang's crimes, there is no evidence that the gang ever shared any of the robbery money outside their personal circle.

Jesse and his cousin Zerelda married on April 24, 1874. They had two children who survived to adulthood: Jesse Edward James (b. 1875) and Mary Susan James (later Barr, b. 1879). Twins Gould and Montgomery James (b. 1878) died in infancy. Jesse Jr. became a lawyer who practiced in Kansas City, Missouri, and Los Angeles, California.

=== Pinkertons ===
In 1874, the Adams Express Company turned to the Pinkerton National Detective Agency to stop the James–Younger gang. The Chicago-based agency worked primarily against urban professional criminals, as well as providing industrial security, such as strike breaking. Because the gang received support from many former Confederate soldiers in Missouri, they eluded the Pinkertons. Joseph Whicher, an agent dispatched to infiltrate Zerelda Samuel's farm, was soon found killed. Two other agents, Captain Louis J. Lull and John Boyle, were sent after the Youngers; Lull was killed by two of the Youngers in a roadside gunfight on March 17, 1874. Before he died, Lull fatally shot John Younger. A deputy sheriff named Edwin Daniels also died in the skirmish.

External videos
- Booknotes interview with Ted Yeatman on Frank and Jesse James: The Story Behind the Legend, October 28, 2001, C-SPAN

Allan Pinkerton, the agency's founder and leader, took on the case as a personal vendetta. He began to work with former Unionists who lived near the James family farm. On the night of January 25, 1875, he staged a raid on the homestead. Detectives threw an incendiary device into the house; it exploded, killing James' young half-brother Archie and blowing off one of Zerelda Samuel's arms. Afterward, Pinkerton denied that the raid's intent was arson, but biographer Ted Yeatman found a letter by Pinkerton in the Library of Congress in which Pinkerton declared his intention to "burn the house down."

Many residents were outraged by the raid on the family home. The Missouri legislature narrowly defeated a bill that praised the James and Younger brothers and offered them amnesty. Allowed to vote and hold office again, former Confederates in the legislature voted to limit the size of rewards the governor could offer for fugitives. This extended a measure of protection over the James–Younger gang by minimizing the incentive for attempting to capture them. The governor had offered rewards higher than the new limit only on the James brothers

Across a creek and up a hill from the James house was the home of Daniel Askew, who is thought to have been killed by James or his gang on April 12, 1875. They may have suspected Askew of cooperating with the Pinkertons in the January 1875 arson of the James house.

=== Downfall of the gang ===
On September 7, 1876, the opening day of hunting season in Minnesota, the James–Younger gang attempted a raid on the First National Bank of Northfield, Minnesota. The robbery quickly went wrong, however, and after the robbery only Frank and Jesse James remained alive and free.

Cole and Bob Younger later said they selected the bank because they believed it was associated with the Republican politician Adelbert Ames, the governor of Mississippi during Reconstruction, and Union general Benjamin Butler, Ames' father-in-law and the Union commander of occupied New Orleans. Ames was a stockholder in the bank, but Butler had no direct connection to it.

The gang attempted to rob the bank in Northfield at about 2 p.m. To carry out the robbery, the gang divided into two groups. Three men entered the bank, two guarded the door outside, and three remained near a bridge across an adjacent square. The robbers inside the bank were thwarted when acting cashier Joseph Lee Heywood refused to open the safe, falsely claiming that it was secured by a time lock even as they held a Bowie knife to his throat and cracked his skull with a pistol butt. Assistant cashier Alonzo Enos Bunker was wounded in the shoulder as he fled through the back door of the bank. Meanwhile, the citizens of Northfield grew suspicious of the men guarding the door and raised the alarm. The five bandits outside fired into the air to clear the streets, driving the townspeople to take cover and fire back from protected positions. They shot two bandits dead and wounded the rest in the barrage. Inside, the outlaws turned to flee. As they left, one shot the unarmed cashier Heywood in the head. Historians have speculated about the identity of the shooter but have not reached consensus.

The gang barely escaped Northfield, leaving two dead companions behind. They killed Heywood and Nicholas Gustafson, a Swedish immigrant from the Millersburg community west of Northfield. A substantial manhunt ensued. It is believed that the gang burned 14 Rice County mills shortly after the robbery. The James brothers eventually split from the others and escaped to Missouri. The militia soon discovered the Youngers and one other bandit, Charlie Pitts. Pitts died in a gunfight and the Youngers were taken prisoner. Except for Frank and Jesse James, the James–Younger Gang was destroyed.

Later in 1876, Jesse and Frank James surfaced in the Nashville, Tennessee, area, where they went by the names of Thomas Howard and B. J. Woodson, respectively. Frank seemed to settle down, but Jesse remained restless. He recruited a new gang in 1879 and returned to crime, holding up a train at Glendale, Missouri (now part of Independence), on October 8, 1879. The robbery was the first in a spree of crimes, including the holdup of the federal paymaster of a canal project in Killen, Alabama, and two more train robberies. However, the new gang was not made up of battle-hardened guerrillas; they soon turned against each other or were captured. James grew suspicious of other members; he scared away one man and some believe that he killed another gang member.

In 1879, the James gang robbed two stores in far western Mississippi, at Washington in Adams County and Fayette in Jefferson County. The gang left with $2,000 cash from the second robbery and took shelter in abandoned cabins on the Kemp Plantation south of St. Joseph, Louisiana. A law enforcement posse attacked and killed two of the outlaws but failed to capture the entire gang. Among the deputies was Jefferson B. Snyder, later a long-serving district attorney in northeastern Louisiana.

By 1881, with local Tennessee authorities growing suspicious, the brothers returned to Missouri, where they felt safer. James moved his family to St. Joseph, Missouri, in November 1881, not far from where he had been born and reared. Frank, however, decided to move to safer territory and headed east to settle in Virginia. They intended to give up crime. The James gang had been reduced to the two of them.

=== Death ===
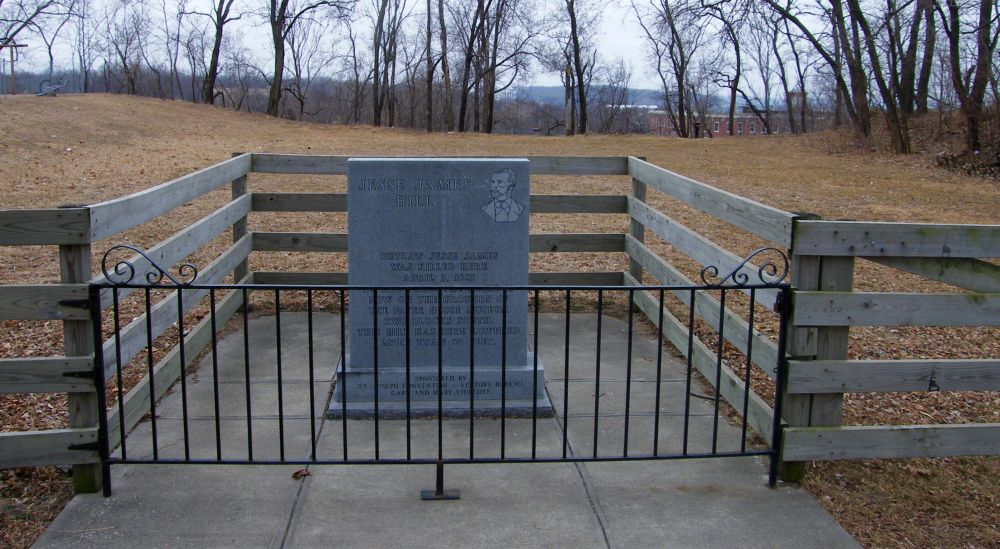
Site at 1318 Lafayette Street, where James was killed. To the right is the top of Patee House, where his widow Zerelda stayed after his death. His house was subsequently moved to the Belt Highway and later to its current location on the Patee House grounds.

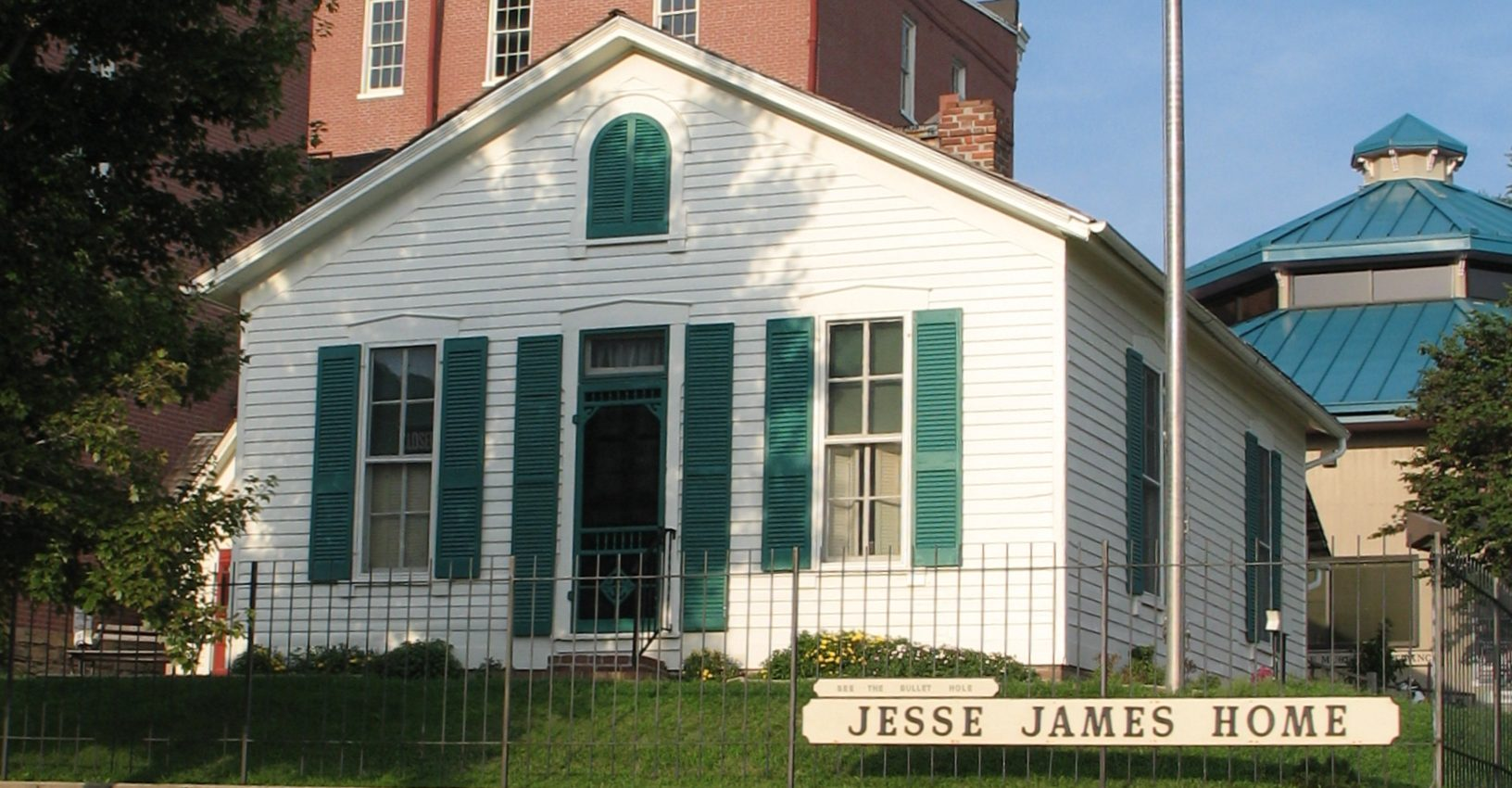
Jesse James' home in St. Joseph, where he was shot (currently at the grounds of the Patee House)

With his gang nearly annihilated, James trusted only the Ford brothers, Charley and Robert. Although Charley had been out on raids with James, Robert was an eager new recruit. For protection, James asked the Ford brothers to move in with him and his family. James had often stayed with their sister Martha Bolton and, according to rumor, he was "smitten" with her. By that time, Robert Ford had conducted secret negotiations with Missouri Governor Thomas T. Crittenden, planning to bring in the famous outlaw. Crittenden had made capture of the James brothers his top priority; in his inaugural address he declared that no political motives could be allowed to keep them from justice. Barred by law from offering a large reward, he had turned to the railroad and express corporations to put up a $5,000 bounty for the delivery of each of them and an additional $5,000 for the conviction of either of them.

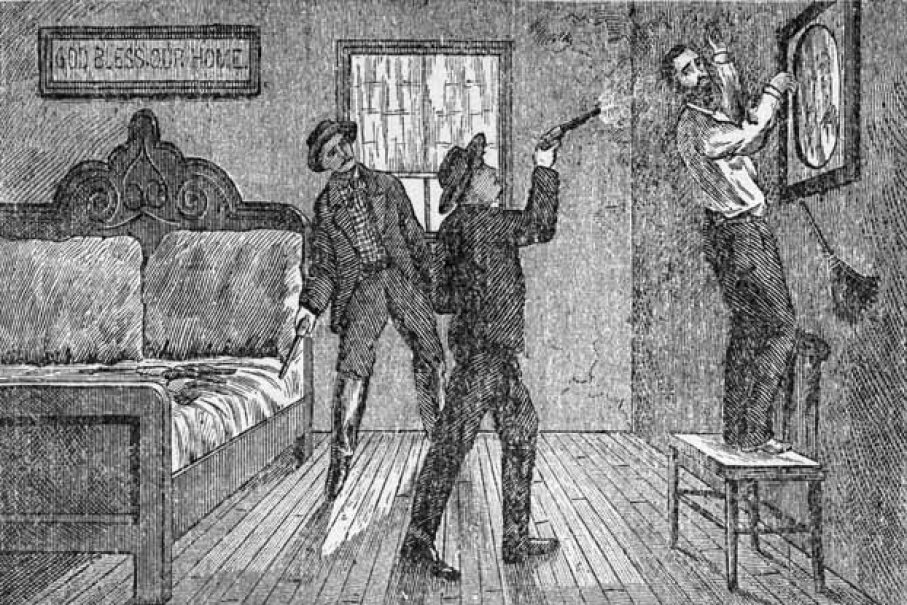
A woodcut shows Robert Ford famously shooting Jesse James from behind while he hangs a picture in his house. Ford's brother Charles looks on.

On April 3, 1882, after eating breakfast, the Fords and Jameses went into the living room before traveling to Platte City for a robbery. From the newspaper, James had just learned that gang member Dick Liddil had confessed to participating in Wood Hite's murder. He was suspicious that the Fords had not told him about it. Robert Ford later said he believed that James had realized they were there to betray him. Instead of confronting them, James walked across the living room and laid his revolvers on a sofa. He turned around and noticed a dusty picture above the mantle, and stood on a chair to clean it. Robert Ford drew his weapon and shot the unarmed Jesse James in the back of the head. James' two previous bullet wounds and partially missing middle finger served to positively identify the body.

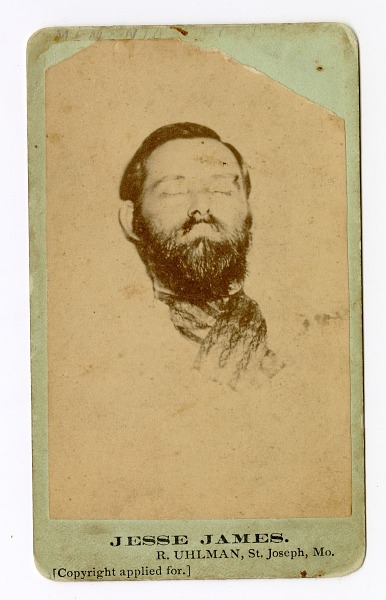
Corpse of Jesse James

The death of Jesse James became a national sensation. The Fords made no attempt to hide their role. Robert Ford wired the governor to claim his reward. Crowds pressed into the little house in St. Joseph to see the dead bandit. The coroner's jury, convened the following morning in a courtroom crowded to suffocation, returned a verdict that "the deceased is Jesse James, and that he came to his death by a pistol shot in the hands of Robt. Ford." Jesse's mother, Zerelda Samuels, testified at the inquest and caused a dramatic scene when she spotted Dick Little near the door, turning on him with the words "Traitor! traitor! traitor!" before being escorted from the room. The Ford brothers surrendered to the authorities and were dismayed to be charged with first-degree murder. In the course of a single day, the Ford brothers were indicted, pleaded guilty, were sentenced to death by hanging, and were granted a full pardon by Governor Crittenden. The governor's quick pardon suggested he knew the brothers intended to kill James rather than capture him. The implication that the chief executive of Missouri conspired to kill a private citizen startled the public and added to James' notoriety.

After receiving a small portion of the reward, the Fords fled Missouri. Sheriff James Timberlake and Marshal Henry H. Craig, who were law enforcement officials active in the plan, were awarded the majority of the bounty. Later, the Ford brothers starred in a touring stage show in which they reenacted the shooting. Public opinion was divided between those against the Fords for murdering Jesse and those of the opinion that it had been time for the outlaw to be stopped. Suffering from tuberculosis (then incurable) and a morphine addiction, Charley Ford committed suicide on May 6, 1884, in Richmond, Missouri. Robert Ford operated a tent saloon in Creede, Colorado. On June 8, 1892, Edward O'Kelley went to Creede, loaded a double-barrel shotgun, entered Ford's saloon and said "Hello, Bob" before shooting Ford in the throat, killing him instantly. O'Kelley was sentenced to life in prison, but his sentence was subsequently commuted because of a 7,000-signature petition in favor of his release, as well as a medical condition. The Governor of Colorado pardoned him on October 3, 1902.

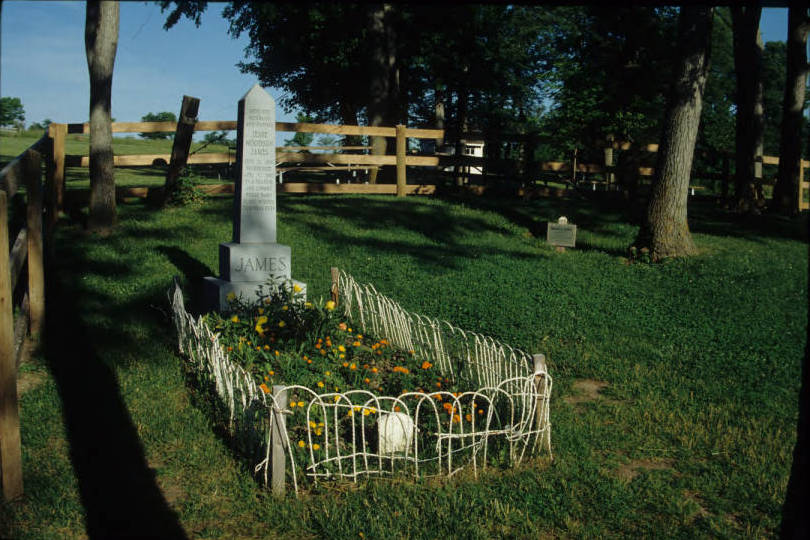
Jesse James Gravestone in Kearney, Missouri

James' original grave was on his family property, but he was later moved to a cemetery in Kearney. The original footstone is still there, although the family has replaced the headstone. James' mother Zerelda Samuel wrote the following epitaph for him: "In Loving Memory of my Beloved Son, Murdered by a Traitor and Coward Whose Name is not Worthy to Appear Here." James' widow Zerelda Mimms James died alone and in poverty.

==== Rumors of survival ====
Rumors of Jesse James' survival proliferated almost as soon as the newspapers announced his death. Some said that Robert Ford killed someone other than James in an elaborate plot to allow him to escape justice. These tales have received little credence, then or since. None of James' biographers accepted them as plausible. The body buried in Kearney, Missouri, marked "Jesse James" was exhumed in 1995 and subjected to mitochondrial DNA typing. The report, prepared by Anne C. Stone, Ph.D., James E. Starrs, L.L.M., and Mark Stoneking, Ph.D., confirmed that the mtDNA recovered from the remains was consistent with the mtDNA of one of James' relatives in the female line.

The theme of survival was featured in a 2009 documentary, Jesse James' Hidden Treasure, which aired on the History Channel. The documentary was dismissed as pseudo history and pseudoscience by historian Nancy Samuelson in a review she wrote for the Winter 2009–2010 edition of The James-Younger Gang Journal.

J. Frank Dalton claimed to be Jesse James. Dalton was allegedly 101 years old at the time of his first public appearance, in May 1948. Dalton died August 15, 1951, in Granbury, Texas. Oran Baker, Hood County sheriff, conducted a visual postmortem exam and found he had thirty-two bullet wounds and a rope burn around his neck. He was buried in Granbury Cemetery, where the headstone bears the name of "Jesse Woodson James". Dalton's story was disputed by James' surviving relatives.

== Legacy ==
James' turn to crime after the end of the Reconstruction era helped cement his place in American life and memory as a simple but remarkably effective bandit. After 1873, he was covered by the national media as part of social banditry. During his lifetime, James was celebrated chiefly by former Confederates, to whom he appealed directly in his letters to the press. Displaced by Reconstruction, the antebellum political leadership mythologized the James Gang's exploits. Frank Triplett wrote about James as a "progressive neo-aristocrat" with "purity of race". Some historians credit James' myth as contributing to the rise of former Confederates to dominance in Missouri politics. In the 1880s, both U.S. Senators from the state, former Confederate military commander Francis Cockrell, and former Confederate Congressman George Graham Vest, were identified with the Confederate cause.

In the 1880s, after James' death, the James Gang became the subject of dime novels that represented the bandits as pre-industrial models of resistance. During the Populist and Progressive eras, James became an icon as America's Robin Hood, standing up against corporations in defense of the small farmer, robbing from the rich and giving to the poor. There is no evidence that he shared the loot of his robberies with anyone other than his gang members; they alone enjoyed the riches with him.

In the 1950s, James was pictured as a psychologically troubled man rather than a social rebel. Some filmmakers portrayed the former outlaw as a revenger, replacing "social with exclusively personal motives." While his "heroic outlaw" image is commonly portrayed in films, as well as in songs and folklore, since the late 20th century, historians such as Stiles have classified him as a self-aware vigilante and terrorist who used local tensions to create his own myth among the widespread insurgent guerrillas and vigilantes following the American Civil War.

Jesse James remains a controversial symbol, one who can always be reinterpreted in various ways according to cultural tensions and needs. Some of the neo-Confederate movement regard him as a hero. However, renewed cultural battles over the place of the Civil War in American history have replaced the long-standing interpretation of James as a Western frontier hero.

=== Museums ===
Museums and sites devoted to Jesse James:

- James Farm in Kearney, Missouri: In 1974, Clay County, Missouri, bought the property. The county operates the site as a house museum and historic site. It was listed on the National Register of Historic Places in 1972, with a boundary increase in 1978.
- Jesse James Home Museum: The house where Jesse James was killed in south St. Joseph was moved in 1939 to the Belt Highway on St. Joseph's east side to attract tourists. In 1977, it was moved to its current location, near Patee House, which was the headquarters of the Pony Express. The house is owned and operated by the Pony Express Historical Association.
- The Jesse James Bank Museum, on the square in Liberty, Missouri, is the site of the first daylight bank robbery in the United States in peacetime. The museum is managed by Clay County along with the James Farm Home and Museum outside of Kearney.
- First National Bank of Northfield: The Northfield Historical Society in Northfield, Minnesota, has restored the building that housed the First National Bank, the scene of the 1876 raid.
- Heaton Bowman Funeral Home, 36th Street and Frederick Avenue, St. Joseph, Missouri: The funeral home's predecessor conducted the original autopsy and funeral for Jesse James. A room in the back holds the log book and other documentation.
- The Jesse James Tavern is located in Asdee, County Kerry, Ireland. It has been claimed that James' ancestors were from that area of Ireland. But documented evidence suggests that on his father's side, Jesse was a third-generation American of English descent.
- According to the National Park Service, Jesse James has a historical connection to Mammoth Cave National Park, having reportedly occupied some of the cave's inner areas during his escapes from the law, and having committed a stage coach robbery between Cave City and Mammoth Cave. These claims are disputed, as, according to Katie Cielinski, a local cave expert, "If every cave that claims Jesse James had been there (was valid), Jesse James would never have been on the surface." It is likely these legends are based on the ample evidence that the Kentucky cave system played host to outlaw camps in general.

=== Festivals ===
The Defeat of Jesse James Days in Northfield, Minnesota, is among the largest outdoor celebrations in the state. It is held annually in September during the weekend after Labor Day. Thousands of visitors watch reenactments of the robbery, a championship rodeo, a carnival, performances of a 19th-century style melodrama musical, and a parade during the five-day event.

Jesse James' boyhood home in Kearney, Missouri, is operated as a museum dedicated to the town's most famous resident. Each year a recreational fair, the Jesse James Festival, is held during the third weekend in September.

The annual Victorian Festival in Jersey County, Illinois, is held on Labor Day weekend at the 1866 Col. William H. Fulkerson estate Hazel Dell. Festivities include telling Jesse James' history in stories and by reenactments of stagecoach holdups. Over the three-day event, thousands of spectators learn of the documented James Gang's stopover at Hazel Dell and of their connection with ex-Confederate Fulkerson.

Russellville, Kentucky, the site of the robbery of the Southern Bank in 1868, holds a reenactment of the robbery every year as of the Logan County Tobacco and Heritage Festival.

The small town of Oak Grove, Louisiana, also hosts a town-wide annual Jesse James Outlaw Roundup Festival, usually in the early to mid autumn. This is a reference to a short time James supposedly spent near this area.

Pineville, Missouri and surrounding areas in McDonald County (including the courthouse square and the nearby Salt Peter cave) were host to the filming of the 1939 American Western film Jesse James directed by Henry King and starring Tyrone Power, Henry Fonda, Nancy Kelly and Randolph Scott. Written by Nunnally Johnson, the supporting cast includes Henry Hull, John Carradine, Brian Donlevy, Jane Darwell and Lon Chaney Jr. The courthouse square in Pineville, a paved thoroughfare, was covered with 400 truck loads of dirt, fake façades were built onto all the buildings on the square and every trace of modern civilization was removed from those buildings to turn back seventy years of time to provide the proper James gang setting. There were many people from the area that were hired for "Extras". Every fall, to celebrate the movie being made here, we have Jesse James Days, which consists of Arts and craft booths set up around the old Square, a cook shack, a Frisbee throw nightly for the kids (which will have prizes attached to them), a Parade, a B-B-Q Chicken Dinner, nightly Music, and many, many more events that are too numerous to mention. The money that is raised goes to the Pineville Fire Auxiliary to operate on for the next year.

== Bibliography ==
- Fellman, Michael. Inside War: The Guerrilla Conflict in Missouri onto the American Civil War. Oxford University Press, 1990. ISBN 0-19-506471-2.
- Settle, William A. Jesse James Was His Name, or, Fact and Fiction Concerning the Careers of the Notorious James Brothers of Missouri. University of Nebraska Press, 1977. ISBN 0-8032-5860-7.
- Stiles, T. J. Jesse James: Last Rebel of the Civil War. Knopf Publishing, 2002. ISBN 0-375-40583-6.
- Yeatman, Ted P. Frank and Jesse James: The Story Behind the Legend. Cumberland House Publishing, 2000. ISBN 1-58182-325-8.
- Quist, B. Wayne, The History of the Christdala Evangelical Swedish Lutheran Church of Millersburg, Minnesota, Dundas, Minnesota, Third Edition, July 2009, page 19–23, The Murder of Nicholaus Gustafson.
