= Younger (surname) =

Younger is an English and Scottish surname, originating from Fife and Clackmannanshire in Scotland and the Scottish/English Border, meaning the second son in a family. It is also common in Northumberland. It is also commonly an anglicized variant of the German surname “Junker” in North America.

The following people bear the surname:

- Members of the Younger family of the James-Younger Gang
  - Bob Younger (1853–1889), American outlaw, son of Henry Washington
  - Cole Younger (1844–1916), American guerrilla and outlaw, son of Henry Washington
  - Henry Washington Younger (1810–1862), businessman, father
  - Jim Younger (1848–1902), American outlaw, son of Henry Washington
  - John Younger (1851–1874), American outlaw, son of Henry Washington
- A. P. Younger (1890–1931), American screenwriter
- David Reginald Younger (1871–1900) Scottish soldier, Victoria Cross recipient
- Drake Younger (born 1984), ring name of American retired professional wrestler and current referee Drake Wuertz
- Edward Younger, 3rd Viscount Younger of Leckie (1906–1997), Scottish peer
- Elizabeth Younger (1699–1762), English actress and dancer
- Elton Younger (1919—2010), British Army officer and Director-General of the Royal United Services Institute
- Evelle J. Younger (1918–1989), American politician
- George Younger, 1st Viscount Younger of Leckie (1851–1929)
- George Younger, 4th Viscount Younger of Leckie (1931–2003), Scottish peer, soldier, politician and banker
- James Younger, 5th Viscount Younger of Leckie (born 1955)
- Jane Younger (1863–1955), Scottish artist
- J. Arthur Younger (1893–1967), American politician
- Paul "Tank" Younger (1928–2001), American football halfback and executive
- Rick Younger (born 1969), American performer
- Robert Younger, Baron Blanesburgh (1861–1946), Scottish law lord
- Tommy Younger (1930-1984), Scottish footballer
- Sam Younger (born 1951), British executive
- Tony Younger (born 1980), American-Israeli basketball player in the Israeli National League
- William L. Younger (1894–1977), American athlete and coach
- William McEwan Younger (1905–1992), Scottish brewer and political activist
- Victor L. Younger (2008-), American scholar from Oklahoma, National Merit Semi-Finalist
