= Miller Brothers =

Miller Brothers may refer to:

- Clell Miller and Edward T. Miller (outlaw), outlaws connected to the James-Younger Gang
- Rand Miller, Ryan Miller and Robyn Miller, co-founders of the company Cyan Worlds, which developed the computer game Myst

== See also ==
- Miller Brothers 101 Ranch, a National Historic Landmark in Oklahoma
- Miller Brothers Farm, a house in the US state of Georgia on the National Register of Historic Places
