= Bad Men of Missouri =

1941 film by Ray Enright

- Theatrical release poster
- Directed by: Ray Enright
- Screenplay by: Charles Grayson
- Story by: Robert E. Kent
- Produced by: Harlan Thompson (associate producer)
- Starring: Dennis Morgan; Jane Wyman; Wayne Morris; Arthur Kennedy
- Cinematography: Arthur Todd, A.S.C.
- Edited by: Clarence Kolster
- Music by: Howard Jackson
- Production company: Warner Bros. Pictures
- Distributed by: Warner Bros. Pictures
- Release date: July 26, 1941
- Running time: 71 minutes
- Country: United States
- Language: English

Bad Men of Missouri is a 1941 American Western film directed by Ray Enright and written by Charles Grayson. The film stars Dennis Morgan, Jane Wyman, Wayne Morris and Arthur Kennedy. The film was released by Warner Bros. Pictures on July 26, 1941.

== Plot ==
Foreword:

"Dishonest men exploiting the misfortune of the South, were driving the farmers from the land. A few men rebelled. Among them were the three Younger brothers. By their enemies they were called "Badmen" ~
Missouri called them heroes.
This is their story."

After the war, with Confederate money now useless, many Missouri farmers find themselves unable to pay their bills. William Merrick and his men begin foreclosing on them or running them off, resulting in the death of Martha Adams, sweetheart of one of the Younger gang.

The brothers Cole, Bob and Jim Younger ride back to Missouri just as their father is shot by Merrick's hired gun, Greg Bilson. A sheriff is killed as well and the Youngers are falsely accused of murdering him, so they retaliate by joining Jesse James's gang and pulling off robberies, giving the money to the needy farmers to pay their taxes.

Merrick decides to flush out Jim Younger by arresting the woman he loves, Mary Hathaway, as an accomplice to the Younger brothers' crimes. He offers to exchange Mary for Jim behind bars, secretly plotting to kill Jim once he's in his custody. The Youngers turn the tables, leading Merrick and Bilson to their own accidental deaths. They leave town and head for Minnesota to pull off another theft, but Mary and the Missourians try to figure a way to bring them safely back home.

== Cast ==
- Dennis Morgan as Cole Younger
- Jane Wyman as Mary Hathaway
- Wayne Morris as Bob Younger
- Arthur Kennedy as Jim Younger
- Victor Jory as William Merrick
- Alan Baxter as Jesse James
- Walter Catlett as Mr. Pettibone
- Howard Da Silva as Greg Bilson
- Faye Emerson as Martha Adams
- Russell Simpson as Henry Washington Younger
- Virginia Brissac as Mrs. Hathaway
- Erville Alderson as Mr. Adams
- Hugh Sothern as Fred Robinson
- Sam McDaniel as Wash
- Dorothy Vaughan as Mrs. Dalton
- William Gould as Sheriff Brennan
- Robert Winkler as Willie Younger
- Ann E. Todd as Amy Younger
- Roscoe Ates as Lafe
- Jack Mower as Henchman (uncredited)
