= William Bullitt =

William Bullitt may refer to:

- William Christian Bullitt Jr. (1891–1967), American diplomat, journalist, and novelist
- William Marshall Bullitt (1873–1957), lawyer, author and Solicitor General of the United States

== See also ==
- William Bullitt Howard, founder of Lee's Summit, Missouri
