= The Long Riders =

1980 film by Walter Hill

- Theatrical release poster
- Directed by: Walter Hill
- Written by: Bill Bryden; Steven Phillip Smith; Stacy Keach; James Keach
- Produced by: Tim Zinnemann; Stacy Keach; James Keach
- Starring: David Carradine; Keith Carradine; Robert Carradine; James Keach; Stacy Keach; Dennis Quaid; Randy Quaid; Christopher Guest; Nicholas Guest
- Cinematography: Ric Waite
- Edited by: Freeman A. Davies; David Holden
- Music by: Ry Cooder
- Production company: Huka Productions
- Distributed by: United Artists
- Release date: May 16, 1980
- Running time: 99 minutes
- Country: United States
- Language: English
- Budget: $8 million
- Box office: $15,795,189; 241,290 admissions (France)

The Long Riders is a 1980 American biographical Western film directed by Walter Hill. It was produced by James Keach, Stacy Keach and Tim Zinnemann and features an original soundtrack by Ry Cooder, for which he won the Best Music award in 1980 from the Los Angeles Film Critics Association Awards. The film was entered into the 1980 Cannes Film Festival.

The film is notable for having cast four sets of actual brothers to play the four sets of brothers in the James–Younger Gang.

== Plot ==
During the years following the Civil War, banks and trains become the targets of the James-Younger gang, who terrorize the Midwestern United States. The band of robbers is led by Jesse James and Cole Younger, along with several of their brothers. After getting antsy during a bank robbery, Ed Miller opens fire and kills the clerk, resulting in a shootout where Jesse is wounded. Jesse dismisses Ed from the gang; his brother Clell remains.

Mr. Rixley, a detective from the Pinkerton's agency, is assigned to capture the outlaws. Rixley doggedly remains on their trail, accidentally killing a Younger cousin and the youngest James brother, and losing several of his men in the process. Due to his errors, the Pinkertons back off. Jim Younger, who initially courted a girl named Beth, is disturbed to find her engaged to Ed. At Frank and Jesse's younger brother's funeral, he convinces Beth to leave Ed and she eventually marries him. Clell Miller suggests the James-Younger Gang ride north in September 1876 to rob a bank belonging to "squareheads" in Northfield, Minnesota; word is out about them and the town has been warned by the Pinkertons.

The holdup goes wrong: the bank's vault has been set on a timer and cannot be opened. A cashier and another citizen are shot and killed. While trying to escape, the gang is fired upon by the townspeople. Two outlaws are killed, Clell is fatally shot, Frank is hit in the arm, and all of the Youngers are badly wounded.

The surviving gang members temporarily make camp in the woods. Jesse decides to continue running, leaving the injured to their fate when a posse catches up to them. Though reluctant and threatened by Cole, Frank joins Jesse and they ride off. Jesse informs Frank he intends to strike up a new gang when they return to Missouri, but Frank is clearly reticent. The James brothers return home to Missouri and the Youngers are captured. Rixley interrogates the Youngers in prison, but they refuse to give up Jesse.

Bob and Charley Ford offer to give up Jesse, who has asked them to join his new gang, for money. Rixley recruits them to assassinate Jesse for $15,000. They have dinner at Jesse's house and, while he adjusts a hanging picture, Bob kills him. Upon learning of his brother's assassination, Frank James turns himself in on the condition he can take Jesse home to be buried. Rixley complies with Frank in custody.

== Cast ==
The Long Riders stars four sets of actor brothers as the real-life sets of brothers:

The Keaches:
- James Keach as Jesse James
- Stacy Keach as Frank James

The Carradines:

- David Carradine as Cole Younger
- Keith Carradine as Jim Younger
- Robert Carradine as Bob Younger

The Quaids:

- Dennis Quaid as Ed Miller
- Randy Quaid as Clell Miller

The Guests:

- Christopher Guest as Charley Ford
- Nicholas Guest as Robert Ford

It also features an uncredited appearance by Ever Carradine, daughter of Robert Carradine and niece to David and Keith Carradine. Additionally James Keach's son, Kalen Keach, is cast as Jesse's son Jesse E. James.

- Savannah Smith Boucher as Zee / Zerelda Mims, Wife of Jesse James
- James Whitmore Jr. as Mr. Rixley
- Fran Ryan as Mrs. Zerelda Cole Samuel, Mother of The James Brothers
- Kevin Brophy as John Younger
- Harry Carey Jr. as George Arthur
- Shelby Leverington as Annie Ralston
- Felice Orlandi as Mr. Reddick
- Pamela Reed as Belle Starr
- Lin Shaye as Kate
- Amy Stryker as Beth
- James Remar as Sam Starr

== Theatre origins ==
=== Brothers ===
In 1971 James and Stacy Keach played the Wright brothers in a television film called The Wright Brothers (1971). This gave James the idea they should portray Jesse and Frank James in a film together. James started off by conceiving a play about the James brothers, Brothers, which Stacy financed and produced. Brothers is a folk opera; the script was credited to Barry Litvak. Christopher Allport provided the music. James Keach played Jesse and Marion Killinger played Frank. It was produced by the Edmund Bananas Ensemble.

They staged it at the Bucks County Playhouse and then toured it through schools in New Jersey.

=== The Bandit Kings ===
The play was then adapted into a country musical, The Bandit Kings, and performed off-Broadway at the Bowery Lane Theatre. James Keach produced (for $10,000), directed and starred as Jesse. The Keaches then decided to turn the musical into a feature film screenplay in which both could star.

== Film development ==
The brothers rewrote the material into screenplay form and combined it with the work of Bill Bryden, who had his own Jesse James script. Stacy Keach says another writer named Steven Smith "came in to pull all the threads together". In October 1975 it was reported the Keach brothers were working on the script, then called Outlaws.

In 1974 James Keach was acting opposite Robert Carradine in the television film The Hatfields and the McCoys and mentioned the project to him; Carradine suggested that he and his brothers play the Younger brothers. David Carradine said:

Bobby and Jim came to me and said, 'Do you want to do this picture?' You know, I just thought it was the kids talkin’, but then they said, ’Well, Stacy said he’ll do it.’ And I said, 'Well, if Stacy said he'll do it. I'll do it.' Then they went to Stacy and said, 'Well, David said he’ll do it’, and Stacy said, "Well, if he’ll do it, I'll do it’. Then we worked on Keith, who was a hard sell, but he couldn't very well turn it down if the rest of us were doing it.

The idea that all the brothers in the story would be played by real-life brothers expanded. In June 1976 it was announced the film would star the Keaches as the James brothers, the Carradines as the Youngers, and Beau and Jeff Bridges as the Fords. In June 1977 it was announced the film would be called The Bad Guys Randy and Dennis Quaid also became attached to the project to play the Miller brothers.

James Keach later recalled, "Everyone told me, 'You can't get all these guys together; family devotion is one thing, but this is Hollywood.' We decided to prove how serious we were by having a group picture taken. We did it at midnight in a recording studio where Keith was cutting some numbers. We sent limousines for everyone; it was quite a production."

The photograph helped convince NBC to finance Long Riders as a six-hour mini-series. It was to be called The Bandit Kings and was announced in May 1978. But then Fred Silverman became president of NBC and cancelled all mini-series ordered by his predecessors.

"It was all happening while I was on Bora Bora making The Hurricane (1979)," said James. "I spent a lot of time fishing with Tim Zinnemann, who was producing the picture. We became good friends and I told him about The Long Riders." Zinnemann took the project to United Artists, "who were interested in funding the film if a suitable director could be found." Stacy Keach said the gimmick of the brothers playing brothers got the film over the line.

=== Walter Hill ===
Stacy Keach says George Roy Hill "scoffed at the notion" of the brothers casting. Zinnemann showed the script to Walter Hill who agreed to direct. Hill had written some scripts for Westerns that had not been made such as Lloyd Williams and His Brother. He had been working on another film which had fallen through and, as he later said, "I'd been dying to do a Western for years. I just like 'em. There's a kind of an idyllic quality that surrounds the shooting of them, it seems like a more fundamental film process, more to me what movies are about than clearing crowds off a city street."

Hill called the film a "strange piece";

Instead of the logical conclusion being at Northfield, it then goes on to another phase of a spiral downward, and ends with Jesse's death. It's very hard material to give the proper dramatic curve to. It doesn't lay out in a classic three-act structure. It's almost a four-act piece with Northfield and the aftermath being the culmination of the third act. The fourth act is almost epilogue: How They Went Down... There's a line from a Jean-Luc Godard film: "The jokes are funny but the bullets are real." That's really what this movie is about. These were big, reckless, high-spirited guys that were unaware of the ripples they caused.

The Ford brothers were going to be played by Beau and Jeff Bridges but by this time they had become unavailable. Jeff Bridges later said, "I couldn't do it because of a schedule conflict. And when I first read the script, I thought it was another case of where the material didn't match up with the gimmick. But then I saw the end result and I thought it was pretty good and I figured we would have had a good time doing it because we know all those other guys. Walter Hill is an extraordinary filmmaker and I think he added a specialness to it that the script lacked."

Joseph Bottoms had discussed the project with James Keach but wanted himself and his brothers to play the Youngers – parts already reserved for the Carradines. Eventually Nicholas and Chris Guest played the Ford brothers.

"The use of all the brothers can be perceived as a gimmick but I wanted a family feeling to the movie," said Hill.

To make the film, David Carradine forfeited his customary profit participation; the Keach brothers gave up the extra profit percentages they were entitled to as executive producers for the Carradine brothers to get the same amount of profits.

Walter Hill later said his "code" for the film was to keep "the jokes funny and the bullets real. It is about moral choices. I think people who object to violence shouldn't go to the movies."

Walter Hill later argued that the best film that had been made about the Younger-James brothers prior to this was The Return of Frank James. "In the historical sense it was also the least accurate, but it had a real sense of character truth," he said.

== Filming ==
Some of the film was shot in Parrott, Georgia, with the opening sequence being filmed in Leary, Georgia. The Main street of Leary was covered with dirt to hide the asphalt road, along with many of the store fronts being modified to look "authentic" to the times. The railroad scenes were filmed on the Texas State Railroad and the Sierra Railroad in Tuolumne County, California.

"The company originally wanted to shoot in Missouri, but they found that urban sprawl just blew that out of the tub," said a publicist. "Parrott was chosen because it's almost as if time stood still there. The ravages of the years have not touched the buildings and it closely resembles Northfield, Minn., in 1876," said Gene Levy, the production manager.

Hill says the most difficult sequence was the one where horses jumped through glass. "We trained them for three weeks, making them do the jump without the glass. Once we conditioned them to that, we put the glass in. It's a big surprise to the horses, and they'll only do it once. We had to use a different set of horses for the second jump." Hill shot the sequence in slow motion, a technique associated with the Westerns of Sam Peckinpah. Hill believes "the way Sam used slow motion was almost directly opposite to mine. What Sam was doing was making individual moments more real by extending them, kind of underlining the horrible moment of being shot. The Long Riders is meant to be almost dream-like to have the reality of a nightmare, where everything is going wrong but there's no focus to it, you don't know where you are or how you got there."

Stacy Keach says the brothers would bond by playing music together every night during the shoot. He says the Guest brothers would sit apart from the others because they were playing villains.

James Keach said the film "was very authentic, not a traditional Western with sagebrush and desert. Ours has more of a midwestern feel to it. We've high hopes for it but I just wish we had more time."

When the film went over its original $7.5 million budget, the Keaches forfeited their executive producer fees. "The Long Riders has been made on faith and idealism," said Keach.

Stacy Keach wrote in his memoirs that Hill "did a great job imposing his vision on our script without undermining its essence" but says "none of us had the clout" to stop the studio from cutting several scenes involving Keach and Randy Quaid. "They just wanted to keep the story moving and focus on the action and not the personal relationships."

== Soundtrack ==
The music for the film was composed, arranged, and performed by Ry Cooder. Cooder said Hill had heard one of his records while making the film "and thought that my music had an atmospheric quality he was looking for. Walter likes scores to be part of his movie’s environment instead of the factor that’s driving it, and I’ve always looked at film music as an environmental issue."

Other performers on the soundtrack were multi-instrumentalist David Lindley and percussionist Milt Holland. Some of the songs were released as an album, The Long Riders.

It was the first of several soundtracks Cooder would write for Walter Hill. Cooder later said this was "the simplest" of his soundtracks to do, adding that:

I’d heard and played enough old time-Southern music that it wasn't too much of a stretch for me to create it. The film was about community and family, and I had to think what the music would have felt like in those days. It had to capture that early American aesthetic, which is a world away from how we live now.... You have to sound "authentic," but you also have to invent that authenticity. I had to imagine myself in another time, and not think about what was happy, sad or dangerous to Arnold Schwarzenegger, but what was happy, sad and dangerous to Jesse James. I ended up concentrating on the scene's emotions, and the music worked fine.

== Release ==
=== Critical response ===
On the review aggregator website Rotten Tomatoes, 81% of 26 critics' reviews are positive, with an average rating of 6.6/10. The website's consensus reads: "With its pared down storytelling, The Long Riders delivers with an evocative atmosphere and artful brutality." Metacritic, which uses a weighted average, assigned the film a score of 68 out of 100, based on 15 critics, indicating "generally favorable" reviews.

Janet Maslin of The New York Times wrote of the film, "Even its languid moments hold a certain fascination, what with Ric Waite's handsome photography and a cast that Noah might envy. The film is slow and only vaguely speculative, though, without much story to give it shape."

Gene Siskel of the Chicago Tribune gave the film three-and-a-half stars out of four and wrote that "the Western will live as long as directors make Westerns as fresh and exciting as The Long Riders, which tells an oft-told story uncommonly well."

Gary Arnold of The Washington Post declared that the film "seems a flawlessly felt and visualized western, true to the subject matter and the aspirations the filmmakers probably held for it."

=== Box office ===
The Long Riders was a box office disappointment upon its initial release. According to Film Comment it made $5,891,149 in the USA, in part due to "a terrible campaign that emphasized how alike all the players looked without exploiting the family theme that might have aided box office."

In June 1981 James Keach wrote a letter to the Los Angeles Times in response to an article on the poor box office performance of Westerns. Keach claimed The Long Riders "wasn't a Star Wars at the box office" but recouped its full $9 million investment and earned United Artists a profit.

Stacy Keach wrote in his memoirs that "I believe to this day that the movie made money even though the studio claimed it only broke even."

== Proposed prequel ==
In May 1981 David Carradine said a prequel, set during The American Civil War, was in development.

In February 1982 Stacy Keach said the script was being written and that it would be a theatrical feature or a television mini series. He said when he was in Arkansas making a TV series "so many people came up to talk about The Long Riders which had been shown there on cable that I got enthusiastic again. I realised the Jesse James legend goes on and on. I can't wait to do the new one."

In September 1982 Stacy Keach said "There's the possibility of doing something for television with it. There's a tremendous amount of history that goes on after The Long Riders. Everybody says, "Well, Jesse's dead,' but it's our contention that he didn't die in quite the way history says he died." However, the project never came to fruition.

== Notes ==
- Schweiger, Daniel (December 1996). "Partners in Crime". Film Score Monthly. Vol. 1, no. 76. pp. 16–18.
