= Younger family =

Younger family may refer to:

- Younger (surname)
- Characters in A Raisin in the Sun
- James–Younger Gang
