= Younger =

Younger or Youngers may refer to:

== People ==
- Younger (surname)
- List of people known as the Elder or the Younger

== Arts and entertainment ==
- Younger, an American novel by Pamela Redmond Satran
  - Younger (TV series), an American sitcom based on the novel
- "Younger" (Seinabo Sey song), 2013
- "Younger" (Ruel song), 2018
- "Younger" (Jonas Blue and Hrvy song), 2019
- Youngers, a British teen drama
- "Younger", a song by Dala from Everyone Is Someone, 2009
- "Younger", a song by Imagine Dragons from Mercury – Acts 1 & 2, 2022
- "Younger", a song by Olly Murs from You Know I Know, 2018
- the Younger family, fictional characters in the play A Raisin in the Sun

== Other uses ==
- Younger v. Harris, a decision of the United States Supreme Court
- Younger Hall, the main music venue in St Andrews, Scotland
- Viscount Younger of Leckie, title in the Peerage of the United Kingdom
- Younger (title), the title traditionally given to the heir apparent to a laird
- Youngers, Missouri, a community in the United States
- Youngers Beer, the common name for brewery William Younger & Co
