= Bob Younger =

American outlaw

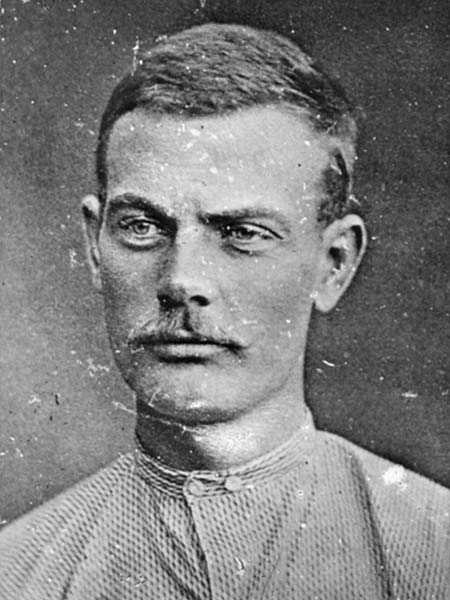
- Injured Bob Younger after his capture in 1876
- Born: Robert Ewing Younger; October 29, 1853; Lee's Summit, Missouri, U.S.
- Died: September 16, 1889 (aged 35); Minnesota Territorial Prison, Stillwater, Minnesota, U.S.
- Burial place: Lee's Summit Cemetery
- Known for: Banditry
- Parent(s): Henry Washington Younger, Bersheba Leighton Fristoe
- Relatives: Jim Younger (brother); John Younger (brother); Cole Younger (brother)

Robert Ewing Younger (October 29, 1853 – September 16, 1889) was an American criminal and outlaw, the younger brother of Cole, Jim and John Younger. He was a member of the James–Younger Gang. He stood six feet, two inches tall and had deep blue eyes, muscular arms, and a thick neck.

== Life ==
Born in Missouri on October 29, 1853, Robert was the thirteenth of fourteen children born to Henry Washington Younger and Bersheba Leighton Fristoe. During the Civil War his brothers Cole and Jim rode with Quantrill's Raiders. Bob was only 8 when the war broke out in 1861. He saw his father killed by Union soldiers and his home burned to the ground.

After the war, his older brothers formed the James–Younger Gang with Frank and Jesse James. For ten years the gang robbed banks, trains, and stage coaches across Missouri, Kansas and other nearby states.

Bob Younger is believed to have first joined the gang in 1873. He was likely involved in the James-Younger Gang's first train robbery on July 21, 1873. The robbery of the Chicago, Rock Island and Pacific Railroad took place in Adair, Iowa, yielded about $3,000, and resulted in the death of an engineer during derailment of the train.

Other robberies where Bob Younger is believed to have participated include the gang's first train robbery in the state of Missouri on January 31, 1874, at Gads Hill on the Little Rock Express/Iron Mountain Line, as well as the $30,000 robbery of the Kansas Pacific Railroad in Muncie, Kansas, on December 8, 1874. Bob Younger was implicated along with two of his brothers by robber Hobbs Kerry, who was caught and convicted for his role in a robbery of the Missouri Pacific Railroad at Otterville, Missouri, on July 7, 1876.

On September 7, 1876, the gang attempted to rob the First National Bank in Northfield, Minnesota. The citizens included many Union army veterans who fought back effectively, and in the ensuing shootout all three of the Younger brothers were wounded, including Bob, who was wounded in the elbow and later in the chest. Two Northfield citizens were killed in the botched raid. Bob, Cole and Jim surrendered on September 21, after they were surrounded, while Jesse and Frank James escaped Minnesota.

== Imprisonment and death ==
Bob Younger pleaded guilty to murder and was sentenced to life in prison. He died of tuberculosis in prison at Stillwater, Minnesota on September 16, 1889, at the age of 35. His body was shipped to Lee's Summit, Missouri where a funeral was held. He was buried in the Lee's Summit Cemetery.

== Film and television portrayal ==
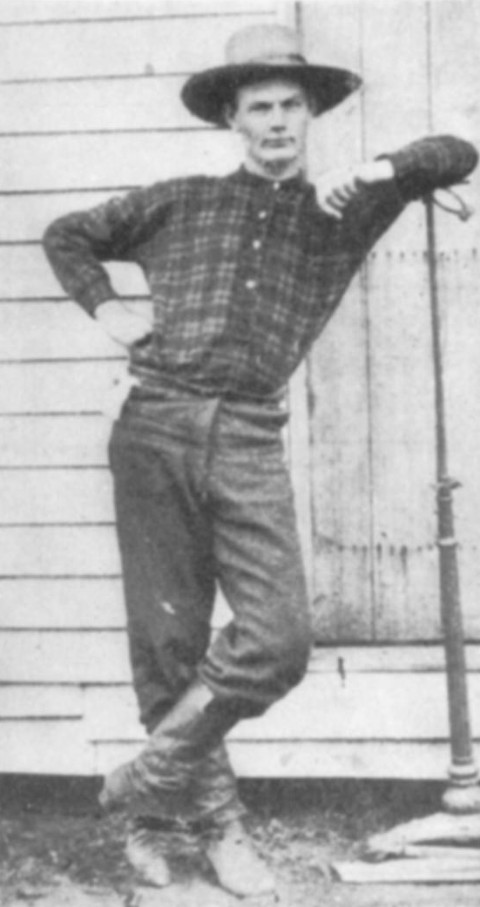
Bob Younger

- Days of Jesse James (1939) portrayed by Forrest Dillon
- Bad Men of Missouri (1941) portrayed by Wayne Morris
- The Younger Brothers (1949) portrayed by James Brown
- The Great Missouri Raid (1951) portrayed by Paul Lees
- Best of the Badmen (1951) portrayed by Jack Beutel
- The True Story of Jesse James (1957) portrayed by Anthony Ray
- Bronco (1960) portrayed by Bill Tennant
- Young Jesse James (1960) portrayed by Robert Palmer
- The Legend of Jesse James (1966) portrayed by Tim McIntire
- The Intruders (1970) portrayed by Zalman King
- The Great Northfield Minnesota Raid (1972) portrayed by Matt Clark
- Poor Devil (1973) portrayed by Nicholas Georgiade
- The Long Riders (1980) portrayed by Robert Carradine
- Frank & Jesse (1995) portrayed by Todd Field
- American Outlaws (2001) portrayed by Will McCormack
- Shootout! (2005) portrayed by Keith Lewis
