= Frank and Jesse =

1994 film

- Original Theatrical Poster
- Directed by: Robert Boris
- Written by: Robert Boris
- Produced by: Cassian Elwes; Elliott Kastner
- Starring: Rob Lowe; Bill Paxton; Randy Travis; Dana Wheeler-Nicholson; Luke Askew; Alexis Arquette; William Atherton
- Cinematography: Walt Lloyd
- Music by: Mark McKenzie
- Distributed by: Trimark
- Release date: October 28, 1994
- Running time: 105 minutes
- Country: United States
- Language: English
- Box office: $ 50,004

Frank and Jesse (also known as Frank & Jesse) is a 1994 American biographical Western film written and directed by Robert Boris and starring Rob Lowe as Jesse James and Bill Paxton as Frank James. Based on the story of Jesse James, the film focuses more on myths of The James Brothers than the real history. It originally aired on HBO.

== Synopsis ==
Following the American Civil War, the two James brothers, along with the Younger brothers - Cole Younger and Bob Younger, Bob Ford and Charles Ford, Clell Miller, and Arch Clements, begin to feel oppressed by the Chicago railroad investors. They set off on a trail of bank robberies, train heists, and stage holdups while evading the dogged pursuit of Allan Pinkerton and his detective agency.

== Cast ==
- Rob Lowe as Jesse James
- Bill Paxton as Frank James
- Randy Travis as Cole Younger
- Dana Wheeler-Nicholson as Annie
- Maria Pitillo as Zee
- Luke Askew as Lone Loner
- Sean Patrick Flanery as Zack Murphy
- Alexis Arquette as Charley Ford
- Todd Field as Bob Younger
- John Pyper-Ferguson as Clell Miller
- Nicholas Sadler as Arch Clements
- William Atherton as Allan PinkertonPinkerton
- Tom Chick as Detective Whitcher
- Mary Neff as Widow Miller
- Jim Flowers as Bob Ford
- Mari Askew as Ma James
- William Michael Evans as Jesse Jr.
- Lyle Armstrong as McGuff
- Cole S. McKay as Sheriff Baylor
- Dennis Letts as Railroad C.E.O.
- Richard Maynard as John Sheets
- John Stiritz as Ruben Samuels
- Micah Dyer as John Younger
- Jackie Stewart as Governor Crittendon
- Chad Linley as Archie Samuels
- Rhed Killing as Stage Driver
- Jerry Saunders as Northfield Teller
- D.C. 'Dash' Goff as Engineer
- Robert Moniot as Young Captain
- Norman Hawley as Baptist Preacher
- Jeffrey Paul Johnson as Davies Bank Teller
- Bryce Thomason as Reporter
- John Paxton as Working Man
- Elizabeth Hatcher-Travis as Woman on Train
- Sudie Henson as Old Woman on Train
- Ron Licari as Townsman (uncredited)

== Soundtrack ==
Frank and Jesse

Soundtrack album by Mark McKenzie
- Released: 1995
- Recorded: 1995
- Genre: Soundtrack
- Label: Intrada Records

The music score was composed by Mark McKenzie and released by Intrada Records.

- "Frank and Jesse Suite"
- "Main Title"
- "Family Moments"
- "Gentle Spirits"
- "Tragedy At Home"
- "Meet the James Gang"
- "Marauding"
- "Daring Escape"
- "Frank's Despair"
- "The Peace Ranch"
- "Mountain Top Dance"
- "The Lord is Callin' You"
- "Northfield Battle"
- "I Play Not Marches ..."
- "Goodbye Jesse"
- "Justice Will Be Served"

== Production ==
The film is the second collaboration of director/writer Robert Boris with Rob Lowe after Oxford Blues in 1984.

== Reception ==
A negative review in the French magazine Impact magazine wrote, "Made worse by appallingly banal images, mediocre acting and a "vast" soundtrack heard a thousand times before, Robert Boris's film sinks further, vacillating between an epic depiction of the James brothers' legend and a more down-to-earth vision. Between the two, between the celebration of high ideals and sordid violence, it sinks. It sometimes sinks into the ridiculous when the desрегаdоѕ, whose faces the whole Far West knows, authorities included, persist in wearing bags over their heads: were Rob Lowe and Bill Paxton no longer available when the director realized his film was missing a few sequences? Probably. He therefore substituted a few random strangers who call each other by the characters' first names."
