= Bersheba Leighton Fristoe =

Mother of the Younger outlaws

Bersheba Younger
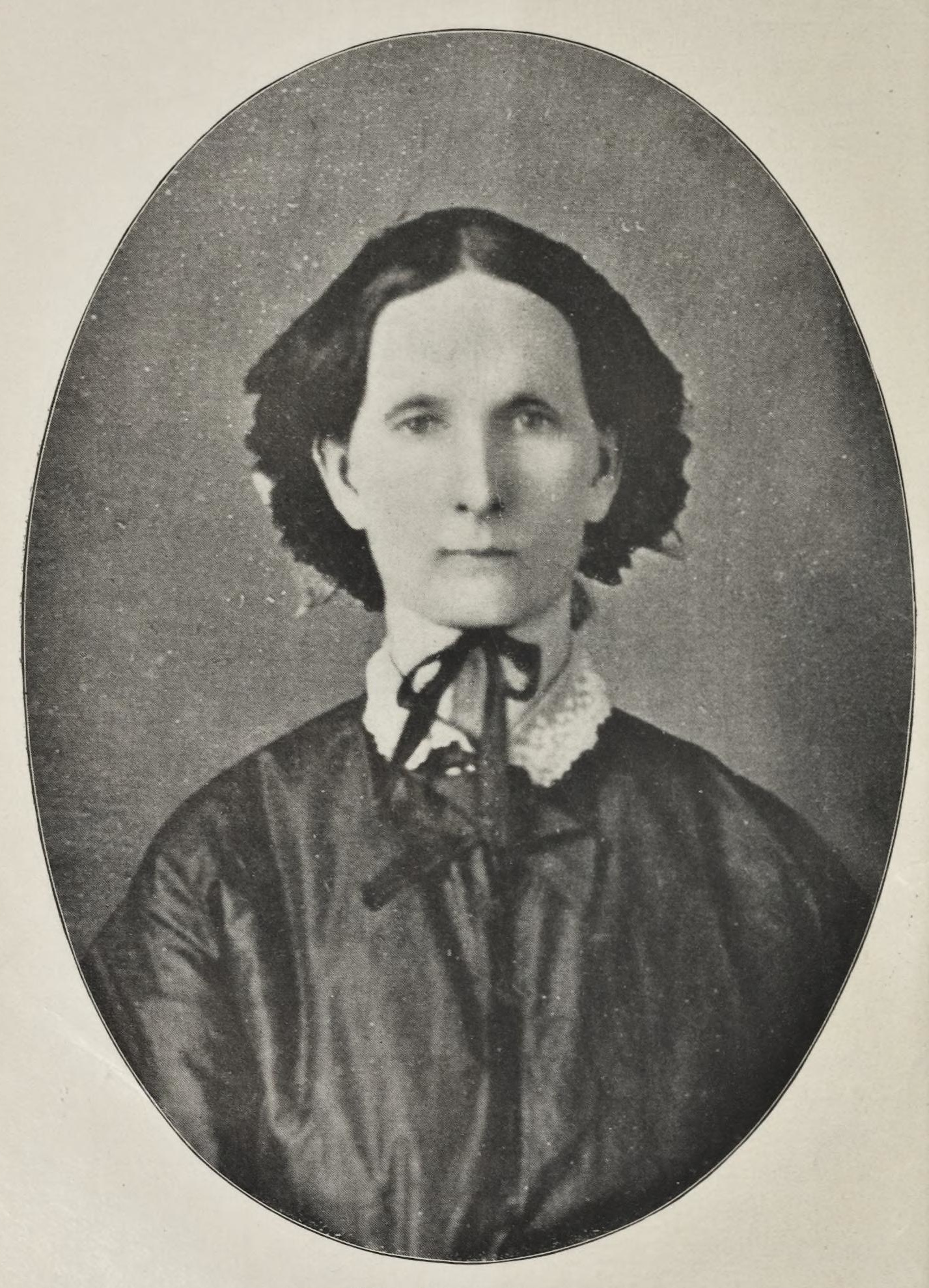
- Born: Bersheba Leighton Fristoe; June 6, 1816; McMinnville, Tennessee, US
- Died: June 6, 1870 (aged 54); Lee's Summit, Missouri, U.S.
- Known for: Mother of the notable Younger outlaws
- Spouse: Henry Washington Younger
- Children: 14, including: Thomas Coleman Younger; James Hardin Younger; John Harrison Younger; Robert Ewing Younger

Bersheba Fristoe Younger (born Bersheba Leighton Fristoe; June 6, 1816 – June 6, 1870) was an American woman who was the mother of the famed Younger Outlaws Cole, Jim, John and Bob. She was born in McMinnville, Tennessee, the daughter of judge Richard Marshall Fristoe and Mary L. Fristoe. (née Sullivan) She married Henry Washington Younger in about 1830 and bore 14 children from 1832 to 1857.

Throughout the 1860s she suffered many tragedies; in 1862 Henry was shot dead. He was brought home and buried in an unmarked grave. In addition, the entire family were targeted by Jayhawkers because of the involvement of Cole and other close relatives with the Missouri Confederate guerrillas led by William Quantrill.

In particular, three of Bersheba's daughters, Mary Josephine Younger Jarrett, 23, Caroline Younger Clayton, 21, and Sarah Ann Younger Duncan, 17, were arrested by Federal troops in summer 1863, on suspicion of aiding the Confederate guerrillas. On August 13, 1863, the Union Prison in Westport holding 17 Confederate woman and girls, and one boy, suddenly collapsed. Five of the woman were killed and most of the remainder, including the three Younger daughters, seriously injured.

After General Order No. 11 required all rural residents of Jackson and Cass Counties to prove their loyalty to the Union and move to settlements close to Union Army outposts, the Youngers - along with many Confederate-sympathizing residents of the area - left Missouri for Texas.

Nearing death, Bersheba returned to Lee's Summit where she died on 6 October 1870.
