= The Intruders (1970 film) =

1970 film

- Theatrical release poster
- Directed by: William A. Graham
- Written by: William Douglas Lansford; Dean Riesner
- Produced by: James Duff McAdams
- Starring: Don Murray; Anne Francis; Edmond O'Brien; John Saxon
- Cinematography: Ray Flin
- Edited by: Howard Terrill
- Music by: Dave Grusin
- Production company: Universal Television
- Distributed by: Rank Film Distributors; National Broadcasting Company
- Release date: November 10, 1970 (United States)
- Running time: 100 minutes
- Country: United States
- Language: English

The Intruders is a 1970 American Western film directed by William A. Graham and starring Don Murray, Anne Francis, Edmond O'Brien, and John Saxon. The movie was filmed in 1967 under the title Death Dance at Madelia.

== Plot ==
Jesse James and Bob Younger's gangs take over a city. Tyrannized, the inhabitants can only rely on the local marshal. Except the latter has lost his nerve and can no longer shoot the gun...

== Cast ==
- Don Murray as Sam Garrison
- Anne Francis as Leora Garrison
- Edmond O'Brien as Colonel William Bodeen
- John Saxon as Billy Pye
- Gene Evans as Cole Younger
- Edward Andrews as Elton Dykstra
- Shelly Novack as Theron Pardo
- Harry Dean Stanton as Whit Dykstra (credited as Dean Stanton)
- Stuart Margolin as Jesse James
- Zalman King as Bob Younger
- Phillip Alford as Harold Gilman
- Harrison Ford as Carl
- John Hoyt as Appleton
- Ken Swofford as Pomerantz
- Robert Donner as Roy Kirsh
- Edward Faulkner as Bill Riley
- James Gammon as Chaunce Dykstra
- Gavin MacLeod as The Warden
