= Edward L. Crain =

American country blues singer and multi-instrumentalist

Cole Younger

Edward Leroy Crain (December 27, 1903 – March 15, 1975), also known by his stage name, "The Texas Cowboy" or his recording alias, "Cowboy Ed Crain", was an American country blues musician who played guitar, fiddle, and mandolin. He recorded in the 1930s and is perhaps best known for his rendition of the song "Bandit Cole Younger".

As a youth Crain was taught to play instruments from his fellow ranch hands working on a ranch as a tailor and taking part in cattle drives, in Longview, Texas. Crain credits Jimmie Rodgers with persuading him to perform professionally when complications from asthma caused difficulties in his occupation. As a part of his stage act, Crain was advertised as "The Texas Cowboy", with a repertoire consisting of songs about cowboys, and was one of the few performers who, in reality, was involved in the profession. Aside from touring in music halls throughout Texas, Crain also played on several radio station programs in Fort Worth, and promoted a cleaning business he managed in the 1930s by performing on an afternoon show.

On July 16, 1931, Crain recorded for the first time, entering the studio for Columbia Records, where he performed a tune called "The Old Grey Hare" under the alias Cowboy Ed Crane. Although Crain was a multi-instrumentalist, his recording only feature his vocals, which were noticeably nasal as a consequence of his asthma, along with guitar accompaniment. Arguably Crain's most recognizable song was his rendition of "Bandit Cole Younger", a musical story written from the perspective of Cole Younger. Crain's version of the composition reappeared on the prominent compilation album, Anthology of American Folk Music, in 1952.

Crain recorded several more sides for Columbia Records, but his asthma developed into emphysema, forcing him to retire from his music career and relocate to Oregon. There he lived a low-profile lifestyle as a rancher, and briefly returned to his career in 1970, re-recording "Bandit Cole Younger". Crain died in Medford, Oregon, in 1975, aged 71.
