= The Great Northfield, Minnesota Raid =

1972 film

- 1972 Theatrical Poster
- Directed by: Philip Kaufman
- Written by: Philip Kaufman
- Produced by: Jennings Lang
- Starring: Cliff Robertson
- Narrated by: Paul Frees
- Cinematography: Bruce Surtees
- Edited by: Douglas Stewart
- Music by: Dave Grusin
- Color process: Technicolor
- Production companies: Robertson and Associates
- Distributed by: Universal Pictures
- Release dates: April 28, 1972 (Los Angeles); June 14, 1972 (United States)
- Running time: 91 minutes
- Country: United States
- Language: English

The Great Northfield, Minnesota Raid is a 1972 American Western film about the James-Younger Gang. Distributed by Universal Pictures, it was written and directed by Philip Kaufman in a cinéma vérité style and stars Cliff Robertson. The film purports to recreate the James-Younger Gang's most infamous escapade, the September 7, 1876 robbery of "the biggest bank west of the Mississippi", in Northfield, Minnesota.

== Plot ==
In the mid-1870s, outlaws Jesse James, Cole Younger and their brothers are granted amnesty by the Missouri legislature, sympathetic to the troubles created for all citizens by the American Civil War. The bankers victimized by the James and Younger gangs are vehemently opposed to this action and hire a Pinkerton agent to follow the outlaws' every move.

Younger has put aside plans to rob a bank in Northfield, Minnesota, said to be the largest west of the Mississippi River. The job appeals, however, to Jesse and Frank James, who have no intention of changing the way they make a living.

Cole is ambushed by Pinkerton's agents, who use a prostitute as bait. After the bankers succeed in having the amnesty overturned by bribing the speaker of the house, Cole travels by train to Minnesota to check out the bank.

Once there, Cole discovers that townspeople are unwilling to deposit their money in the bank owing to concerns over its safety from thieves. Jesse, Frank, and their men arrive on horseback and, together with Cole, persuade the locals that a gold shipment is on its way to the bank because it is supposed to be the safest possible place for it.

Once the citizens have banked their money, the robbery begins. Many things go wrong, though, including one outlaw being locked inside a vault, and two members of the gang are killed by the townspeople. Teller Heywood, having discovered the "gold shipment" is bags of rocks, assumes Wilcox is part of the robbery and refuses to open the time-lock vault. The gang shoots Heywood dead and brutally beats Wilcox. In the street, local derelict Gustavson begins gibbering uncontrollably and the panicky gang lookouts shoot him dead, alerting the townspeople. Cole Younger and his men flee to a nearby farm, but a posse tracks and apprehends them, mostly due to Cole's refusal to abandon his wounded brother Bob. The James brothers get away. When Jesse mentions to Frank his intention to permit Bob Ford to join the gang back in Missouri, his fate is sealed.

== Cast ==
- Cliff Robertson as Cole Younger
- Robert Duvall as Jesse James
- Luke Askew as Jim Younger
- R. G. Armstrong as Clell Miller
- Dana Elcar as Allen
- Donald Moffat as Manning
- John Pearce as Frank James
- Matt Clark as Bob Younger
- Wayne Sutherlin as Charley Pitts
- Robert H. Harris as Wilcox
- Jack Manning as Heywood
- Elisha Cook Jr. as Bunker
- Royal Dano as Gustavson
- Mary-Robin Redd as Kate
- William Callaway as Callipist
- Arthur Peterson as Jefferson Jones
- Craig Curtis as Chadwell
- Barry Brown as Henry Wheeler
- Nellie Burt as Doll Woman
- Liam Dunn as Drummer
- Madeleine Taylor Holmes as Granny Woman
- Herbert Nelson as Chief Detective
- Erik Holland as Sheriff
- Anne Barton as Clell's Wife
- Marjorie Durant as Maybelle
- Inger Stratton as Singing Whore
- Valda Hansen as Nude Girl
- Paul Frees as Narrator (uncredited)

== Production ==
The film was shot in Jacksonville, Oregon.

== Reception ==
On the review aggregator website Rotten Tomatoes, 73% of 11 critics' reviews are positive.

== See also ==
- List of American films of 1972
