= Cole Younger =

American Confederate States guerilla and outlaw (1844–1916)

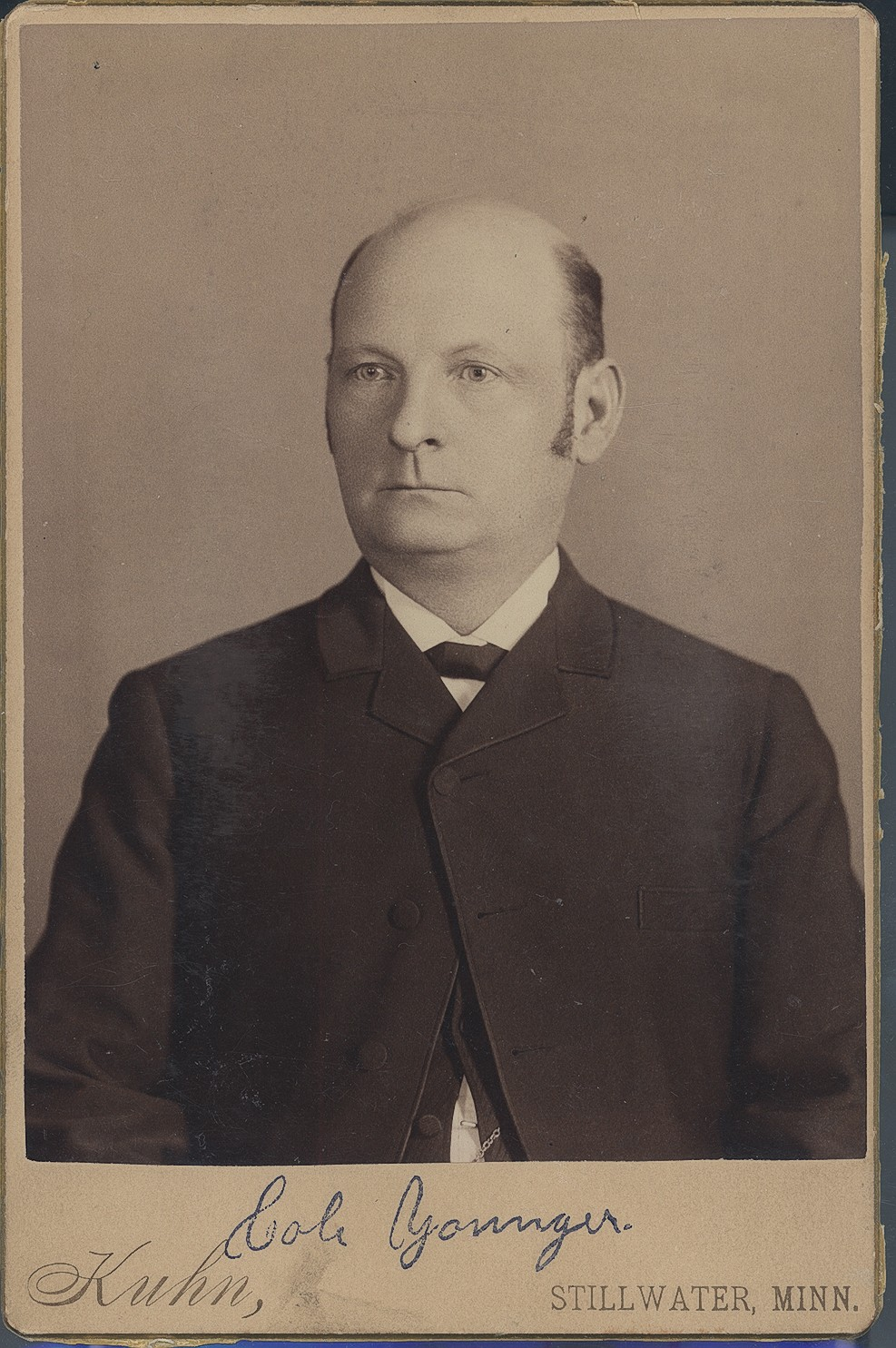
- Portrait of Cole Younger taken when he was a prisoner at the Minnesota State Prison, c. 1889
- Born: Thomas Coleman Younger; January 15, 1844; Jackson County, Missouri, U.S.
- Died: March 21, 1916 (aged 72); Lee's Summit, Missouri, U.S.
- Resting place: Lee's Summit Historical Cemetery
- Occupations: C.S.A. Captain; C.S. Army Recruiter
- Known for: Banditry; James–Younger Gang; Bank robbery; Train robbery
- Parents: Henry Washington Younger; Bersheba Leighton Fristoe
- Relatives: Jim Younger (brother); John Younger (brother); Bob Younger (brother)

Thomas Coleman Younger (January 15, 1844 – March 21, 1916) was an American Confederate guerrilla during the American Civil War and later an outlaw leader with the James–Younger Gang. He was the elder brother of Jim, John and Bob Younger, who were also members of the gang.

== Early life ==
Younger was born on January 15, 1844, on the Younger family farm in Jackson County, Missouri. He was a son of Henry Washington Younger, a prosperous farmer from Greenwood, Missouri and Bersheba Leighton Fristoe, daughter of a prominent Jackson County farmer. Cole was the seventh of fourteen children.

== Civil War ==
During the American Civil War, savage guerrilla warfare wracked the state of Missouri. Younger's father was a Union supporter, but he was shot dead by a Union soldier from Kansas. After that, Cole Younger sought revenge as a pro-Confederate guerrilla or "bushwhacker" under William Clarke Quantrill. By 1862, the Confederate Army had been forced to withdraw from the state, and most of the fighting involved pro-Union and pro-Confederate partisans rather than regular armies. However, the bushwhackers held a special hatred for the "red leg" Union troops from Kansas who frequently entered Missouri and earned a reputation for ruthlessness. Younger rode with Quantrill in a retaliatory raid on Lawrence, Kansas on August 21, 1863, during which about 200 citizens were killed and the town looted and burned.

Younger later claimed to have eventually left the bushwhackers and enlisted in the Confederate Army. He claimed he was sent to California on a recruiting mission, and returned after the war's end to find Missouri ruled by a militant faction of Unionist Radicals. In the last days of the war, the Radicals had pushed through a new state constitution that barred all Confederate sympathizers from voting, serving on juries, holding public office, preaching the gospel, or carrying out other public roles. The constitution freed all slaves in Missouri in advance of the ratification of the 13th Amendment to the U.S. Constitution. It enacted a number of reforms, but the restrictions on former Confederates created disunity.

== Outlaw career ==
Most of the former bushwhackers returned to peaceful lives. Many left Missouri for friendlier places, particularly Kentucky, where they had relatives. Most of their former leaders, including Quantrill and William "Bloody Bill" Anderson, had been killed during the war. But a small core of Anderson's men, led by the ruthless Archie Clement, remained together. State authorities believed that Clement planned and led the first daylight peacetime armed bank robbery in U.S. history when he held up the Clay County Savings Association on February 13, 1866. The bank was run by the leading citizens of Clay County, who had just held a public meeting for their association. The governor posted a reward for Clement, but he and his band of outlaws conducted further robberies that year. On election day of 1866, Clement led his men to polling places in Lexington, Missouri, where they intimidated citizens and secured the election of a slate of candidates. A state militia unit entered the town shortly thereafter and killed Clement when he resisted arrest.

It is uncertain when the Younger brothers joined the Clement gang. The first mention of their involvement came in 1868, when authorities identified Cole as a member of a gang that robbed Nimrod Long & Co., a bank in Russellville, Kentucky. Former guerrillas John Jarrett (Younger's brother-in-law), Arthur McCoy, and George and Oliver Shepard were also implicated. Oliver Shepard was killed resisting arrest and George was imprisoned. Once the more senior members of the gang had been killed, captured, or quit, its core thereafter consisted of the Younger brothers, Frank James, and Jesse James.

Witnesses repeatedly gave identifications that matched Cole Younger in robberies carried out over the next few years, as the outlaws robbed banks and stagecoaches in Missouri and Kentucky. On July 21, 1873, they turned to train robbery, derailing a locomotive and looting the express car on the Rock Island Railroad in Adair, Iowa. Younger and his brothers were also suspects in robberies in Missouri, Kentucky, Kansas, and West Virginia.

Following the robbery of the Iron Mountain Railroad at Gad's Hill, Missouri in 1874, the Pinkerton National Detective Agency began to pursue the so-called James–Younger Gang. Two agents (Louis J. Lull and John Boyle) engaged John and Jim Younger in a gunfight on a Missouri road on March 17, 1874. Lull and John Younger were killed and Boyle and Jim Younger fled the scene. Another Pinkerton agent who pursued the James brothers, W. J. Whicher, was abducted and later found dead alongside a rural road in Jackson County, Missouri.

Some Younger families changed their last names to Jungers to avoid a family association with the gangsters. The James and Younger brothers survived capture longer than most Western outlaws because of their strong support among former Confederates. Jesse James became the public face of the James–Younger Gang, appealing to the public in letters to the press.

== Downfall of the gang ==
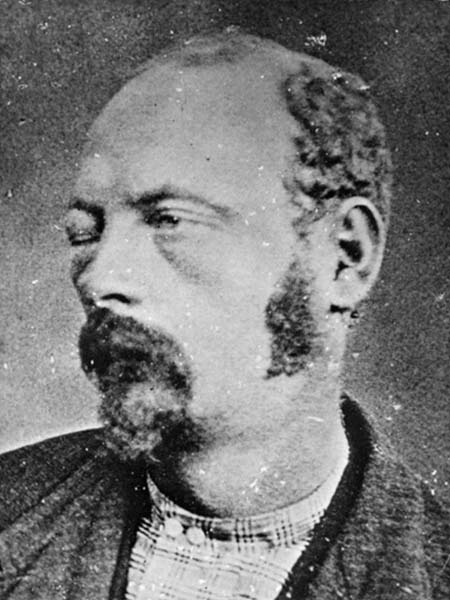
Cole Younger after being wounded and captured in 1876

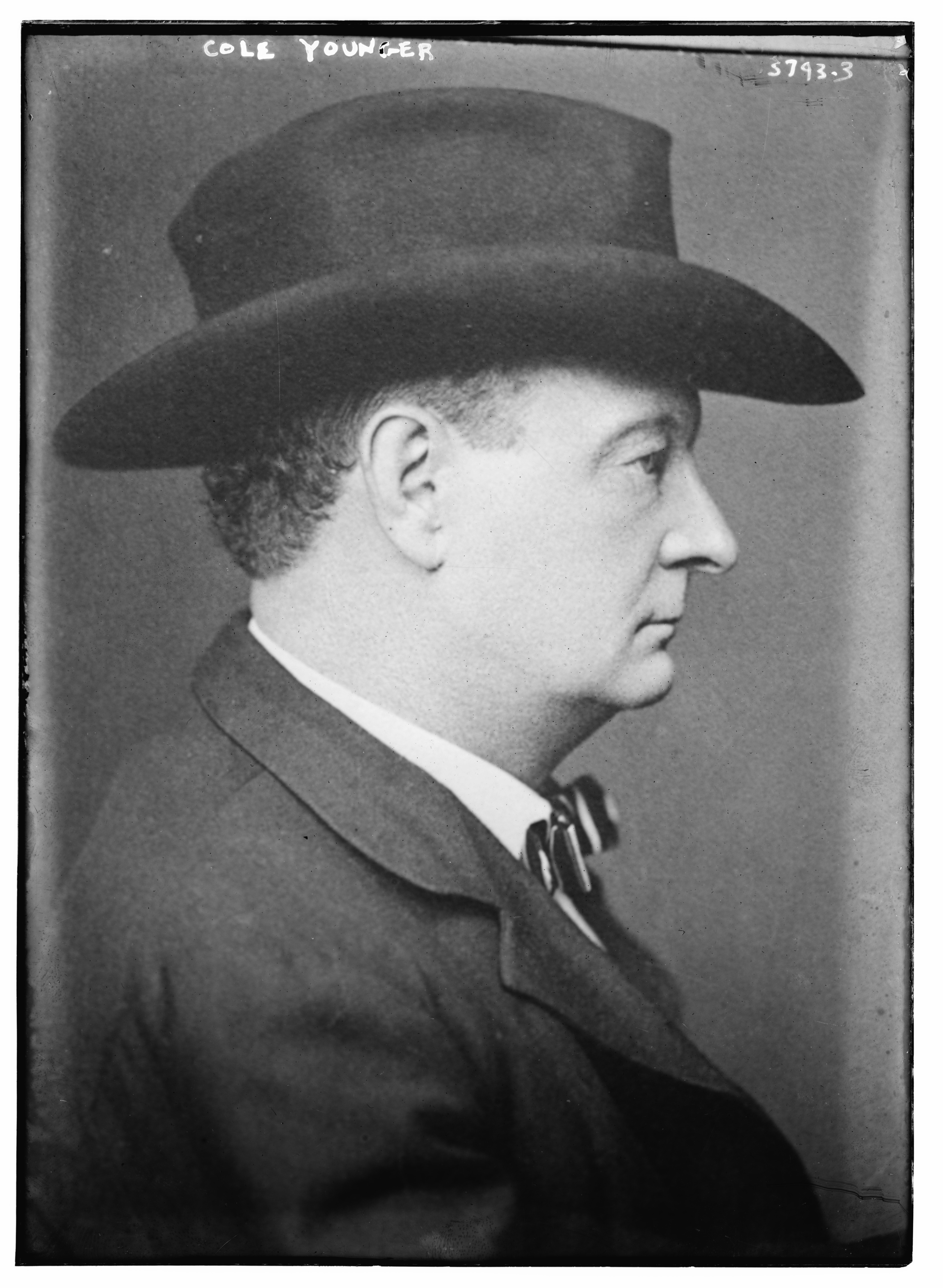
Cole Younger, c. 1915

On September 7, 1876, the James–Younger Gang attempted to rob a bank in Northfield, Minnesota. Cole Younger and his brother Bob both later said that they selected the bank because of its connection to two former Union generals and Radical politicians, Benjamin Butler, a Democrat, and Adelbert Ames, a Republican. Three of the outlaws entered the bank, as the remaining five, led by Cole Younger, remained on the street to provide cover. The crime soon went awry, however, when the townspeople sent up the alarm and ran for their guns. Younger and his brothers began to fire in the air to clear the streets, but the townspeople (shooting from behind cover, through windows and around the corners of buildings) opened a deadly fusillade, killing gang members Clell Miller and William Chadwell and badly wounding Bob Younger through the elbow. Herb Potter rode off in a hail of bullets.

The outlaws killed two townspeople, including the acting cashier of the bank, and fled empty-handed. As hundreds of Minnesotans formed posses to pursue the fleeing gang, the outlaws separated. The James brothers made it back to Missouri, but the three Youngers (Cole, Bob, and Jim) did not. They and another gang member, Charlie Pitts, waged a gun battle with a local posse in a wooded ravine along the Watonwan River west of Madelia, Minnesota. Pitts was killed, and Cole, Jim, and Bob Younger were badly wounded and captured. Cole, asked about the robbery, responded, "We tried a desperate game and lost. But we are rough men used to rough ways, and we will abide by the consequences."

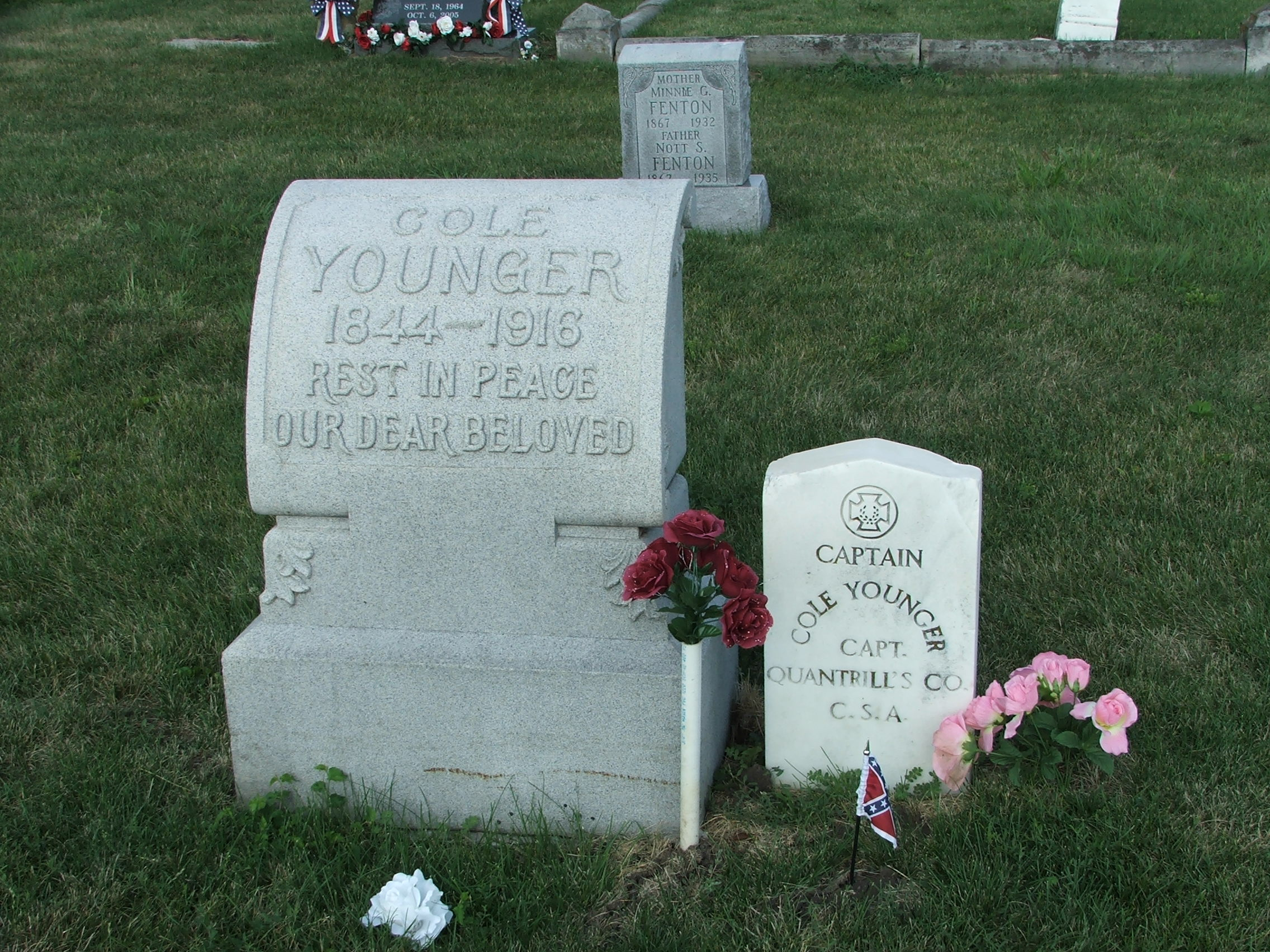
Cole Younger gravesite in Lee's Summit, Missouri

Cole, Jim, and Bob pleaded guilty to their crimes to avoid execution. They were sentenced to life in prison at the Minnesota Territorial Prison at Stillwater on November 18, 1876. Frank and Jesse James fled to Nashville, Tennessee, where they lived peacefully for the next three years. In 1879, Jesse returned to a life of crime, which ended with his death on April 3, 1882, in Saint Joseph, Missouri. Frank James surrendered to Missouri Governor Thomas T. Crittenden on October 4, 1882. Eventually, Frank James was acquitted and lived quietly and peacefully after that.

== Later years ==
While in custody, Cole, Jim and Bob donated money for the creation of the Prison Mirror, one of the first prison newspapers in the US. Cole also worked for the newspaper as their printer's devil, and also worked as the prison's librarian. Bob Younger died in Stillwater prison on September 16, 1889, of tuberculosis. Cole and Jim were paroled on July 10, 1901, with the help of the prison warden. Jim committed suicide in a hotel room in St. Paul, Minnesota, on October 19, 1902. Cole wrote a memoir that portrayed himself as a Confederate avenger more than an outlaw, admitting to only one crime, that at Northfield. He lectured and toured the south with Frank James in a wild west show, The Cole Younger and Frank James Wild West Company, in 1903. On August 21, 1912, Cole declared that he had become a Christian and repented of his criminal past. He was baptized at Lee's Summit Christian Church on 16 August 1913.

Frank James died on February 18, 1915. A year later, Cole Younger died, on March 21, 1916, in his hometown of Lee's Summit, Missouri, and is buried in the Lee's Summit Historical Cemetery.

== In popular culture ==
=== Film ===
- Jesse James as the Outlaw (1921), played by Harry Hoffman.
- Bad Men of Missouri (1941) featured Younger, played by Dennis Morgan, and his two outlaw brothers fighting the bank.
- Return of the Badmen (1948)
- The Younger Brothers (1949) had Wayne Morris play Cole in a fictional story of the Youngers receiving their pardon.
- Kansas Raiders (1950) featured James Best playing Younger in a depiction of his time spent with Quantrill's Raiders.
- The True Story of Jesse James (1957), directed by Nicholas Ray, featured Alan Hale, Jr. as Younger.
- Cole Younger, Gunfighter (1958) featured Cole played by Frank Lovejoy.
- The Intruders (1970) featured Cole played by Gene Evans.
- The Great Northfield Minnesota Raid (1972) depicts the failed Northfield bank robbery, with Cliff Robertson as Cole Younger.
- The Long Riders (1980) depicts the era of the James–Younger Gang's exploits, with David Carradine playing Cole.
- Frank and Jesse (1994) depicts the James–Younger Gang's outlaw days, with Randy Travis playing Cole.
- American Outlaws (2001) depicts the early years of the James–Younger Gang, with Scott Caan playing Cole.
- True Grit (2010) briefly depicts Younger operating his Wild West show in the early 1900s, with Don Pirl playing Cole.

=== Television ===
- In 1959, the episode "Cole Younger" (Season 4, Episode 17) of the western television show Tales of Wells Fargo shows Cole Younger (Royal Dano) and his brothers having a run-in with Jim Hardie (Dale Robertson) of Wells Fargo after their Northfield, Minnesota bank job.
- In a 1959 episode of The Rifleman (Season 1 Ep. 28, "The Challenge") the outlaw Jake Pardee is referred to as being: “Even bigger than Cole Younger”.
- In 1960, Robert J. Wilke played Younger in the episode "Perilous Passage", the series premiere of the NBC western Overland Trail, starring William Bendix and Doug McClure.
- In 1960, an episode of Bronco, "Shadow of Jesse James", told the story of the Northfield Bank Robbery.
- In "One Way Ticket", a 1962 episode of Cheyenne, Clint Walker, in the title role of Cheyenne Bodie, is a federal marshal escorting Younger, played by Philip Carey, to prison to begin his sentence.
- In a 1983 episode of Little House on the Prairie (1974–1983) (Season Nine, Episode 14 - 'The Younger Brothers', Cole was portrayed by Geoffrey Lewis, who had brothers Bart (Robert Donner) and Lonnie (Timothy Scott) bungling robberies and kidnappings after fourteen years in prison, then realizing they were no longer up to it. The episode was done in a more comedic style.
- The TV series Dr. Quinn, Medicine Woman featured Cole portrayed by Ian Bohen in the episode "Baby Outlaws".
- Cole Younger is the main antagonist in the Hulu Original Series Quick Draw. In the show, he is characterized by a large leather mask that he wears in perpetuity, and the only reference to a brother is his follower: Ephram Younger. The character resides just outside the town of Great Bend, Kansas and is played by Brian O'Connor.

=== Literature ===
- Cole Younger appears briefly towards the end of Charles Portis' 1968 novel True Grit.
- Cole Younger is a major character in Wildwood Boys (William Morrow, 2000; New York), a biographical novel of "Bloody Bill" Anderson by James Carlos Blake.

=== Music ===
- "Bandit Cole Younger' by Ed Crain was originally recorded in 1931 and was included in the first volume of the Harry Smith Anthology of American Folk Music in 1952.
