= American Outlaws (2001 film) =

2001 film by Les Mayfield

- Theatrical release poster
- Directed by: Les Mayfield
- Written by: Roderick Taylor; John Rogers
- Produced by: James G. Robinson; Bill Gerber
- Starring: Colin Farrell; Scott Caan; Ali Larter; Gabriel Macht; Gregory Smith; Harris Yulin; Will McCormack; Kathy Bates; Timothy Dalton
- Cinematography: Russell Boyd
- Edited by: Michael Tronick
- Music by: Trevor Rabin
- Production company: Morgan Creek Productions
- Distributed by: Warner Bros. Pictures
- Release date: August 17, 2001
- Running time: 94 minutes
- Country: United States
- Language: English
- Budget: $35 million
- Box office: $13.7 million

American Outlaws is a 2001 American Western action film directed by Les Mayfield and starring Colin Farrell, Scott Caan, and Ali Larter.

American Outlaws was released by Warner Bros. Pictures on August 17, 2001 to negative reviews from critics, and the film was a box office bomb, grossing $13.7 million against a $35 million budget.

== Plot ==
Confederate guerillas attempt to raid a Union Army camp late in the American Civil War. The guerillas are ambushed, but thanks to the sharp-shooting of Frank James and the distractions of his brother Jesse they survive. The James, along with their cousins, the Younger brothers, congratulate themselves but learn that the Confederacy has surrendered and the war is now over. The group decides to return to Missouri to their families and farms.

When they arrive, their town is occupied by the Union Army. Jesse childhood friend and cousin Zee has grown into an attractive young woman, and there is a man hanging in the town square. Farmers are being pressured to sell their farms to the railroad company, who are expanding across the United States. If they don't sell their land to Thaddeus Rains, and his secret-service organizer, Allan Pinkerton, the farmers are burned out of their homes, or killed.

Frank finds the railroad doesn't even need their land. The James and the Younger brothers don't want to sell, and Cole Younger loses his temper when several railroad men approach him about selling and kills two of them. The army authorities decide to hang him, but his brothers Bob and Jim, along with Jesse, Frank, and Zee, decide to rescue him. During the rescue, Jesse is shot in the shoulder, and hides out at Zee's.

A few weeks later, when Jesse has recovered, the railroad sets fire to the James' home, killing Jesse's mother. The James and Younger brothers ride out for revenge against the railroad men but instead focus on the bank's payroll, reasoning that if they steal the money and attack supply trains, the army will notice. Dubbing themselves the James–Younger Gang, they set out robbing banks, with Pinkerton and Rains struggling to stop them. The James gang turns themselves into folk heroes in the process.

The gang struggles over leadership, with Cole feeling that Jesse is getting an overblown ego from the publicity of the gang's activities. Jesse backs down, after an argument, and lets Cole plan and execute a robbery; Cole's chosen target proves to be a trap set by Pinkerton and Rains. Jim is shot and killed, and Jesse and his brother leave the gang, with Jesse later marrying Zee.

The gang does not do well without the James brothers. People do not respect the Younger brothers as much as they did the James-Younger Gang. When Jesse and Zee attempt to start a new life, Pinkerton finds and arrests Jesse. During the train ride to the jail, Jesse is chained in a rear car, but tricks a deputy into showing his gun, which he takes from him and uses to escape to the top of the train car.

Zee and the remainder of the Gang shoot a cannon at the train, stopping it and rescuing Jesse. Confronted with Rains and Pinkerton, Jesse shoots neither of them but rather Rains' prized watch. Pinkerton tells Jesse that he should go to Tennessee, as 'the railroad has no interest in Tennessee'.

== Cast ==
- Colin Farrell as Jesse James
- Scott Caan as Cole Younger
- Ali Larter as Zee Mimms
- Gabriel Macht as Frank James
- Gregory Smith as Jim Younger
- Harris Yulin as Thaddeus Rains
- Will McCormack as Bob Younger
- Kathy Bates as Zerelda James
- Timothy Dalton as Allan Pinkerton
- Ronny Cox as Doc Mimms
- Terry O'Quinn as Rollin Parker
- Nathaniel Arcand as Comanche Tom
- Ty O'Neal as Clell Miller
- Joe Stevens as Loni Packwood
- Muse Watson as Burly Detective

== Production ==
In April 1995, it was reported Morgan Creek Entertainment was developing at western similar to Young Guns to be potentially directed by Dean Semler. In July 1998, it was revealed the name of the project was Jesse James with Roderick Taylor writing the script and the search for a director was ongoing.

In April 2000, it was announced Colin Farrell had been cast to play Jesse James with further re-writes being performed by John Rogers. The following month, Scott Caan and Ali Larter joined the cast.

The railroad scenes were filmed at the Texas State Railroad, the locomotives used for the scenes were Nos. 201 and 400.

== Home media ==
The film was released on VHS and DVD by Warner Home Video on December 4, 2001.

== Reception ==
American Outlaws opened to dismal box office and mostly negative reviews. Many critics cited a poor sense of time and place as a major cause of the film's problems. Others just dismissed the film as another Young Guns ripoff.

On Rotten Tomatoes, the film has a 13% approval rating based on 101 reviews, with an average rating of 4.3/10. The website's critics consensus reads: "With corny dialogue, revisionist history, anachronistic music, and a generically attractive cast, American Outlaws is a sanitized, teenybopper version of Jesse James". On Metacritic, it has a score of 25% based on reviews from 26 critics, indicating "generally unfavorable" reviews.

Roger Ebert of the Chicago Sun-Times wrote: "For years there have been reports of the death of the Western. Now comes American Outlaws, proof that even the B Western is dead." Robert Koehler of Variety said the film "sadly symbolizes the decline of the Western. The 36th bigscreen version of the exploits of the James-Younger Gang is one of the least convincing."

Kevin Thomas of the Los Angeles Times gave it a positive review and called it "a handsome and skillful retelling of a legend that imaginatively draws on conventions of both the western and the gangster movie to create an energetic yet thoughtful contemporary action-adventure."
