= Lee's Summit Historical Cemetery =

Cemetery in Lee's Summit, Missouri

- Interactive map of Lee's Summit Historical Cemetery

Details
- Established: 1867
- Location: 806 SE 3rd St, Lees Summit, Missouri
- Coordinates: 38°54′58″N 94°21′49″W
- Type: Public
- Owned by: City of Lee's Summit, Missouri
- Size: 20 acres (81,000 m^{2})
- No. of graves: 20,000
- Website: LSHC Homepage
- Find a Grave: Lee's Summit Historical Cemetery
- The Political Graveyard: Lee's Summit Historical Cemetery

Lee's Summit Historical Cemetery (LSHC) is a cemetery in Lee's Summit, Missouri.

== History ==
The cemetery was established in 1865 when William Bullitt Howard donated approximately two acres to the town of Strother, which was later incorporated and became known as Lee's Summit. Before this, there were numerous family cemeteries throughout the area. The second addition of the cemetery was surveyed in May 1875, and in April 1887, a third addition was added. Two additional acres were purchased from Howard's wife in December 1889. The cemetery grew again in April 1907 when another 2 acres (8,100 m^{2}) were added. Sidewalks were built along the cemetery in September 1915. The cemetery roads were graveled in July 1931 and then paved in September 1975. In July 2002, the original wrought iron sign was restored and placed at the southeast corner of the cemetery. This sign dates back to 1860 and once marked the entrance to the cemetery.

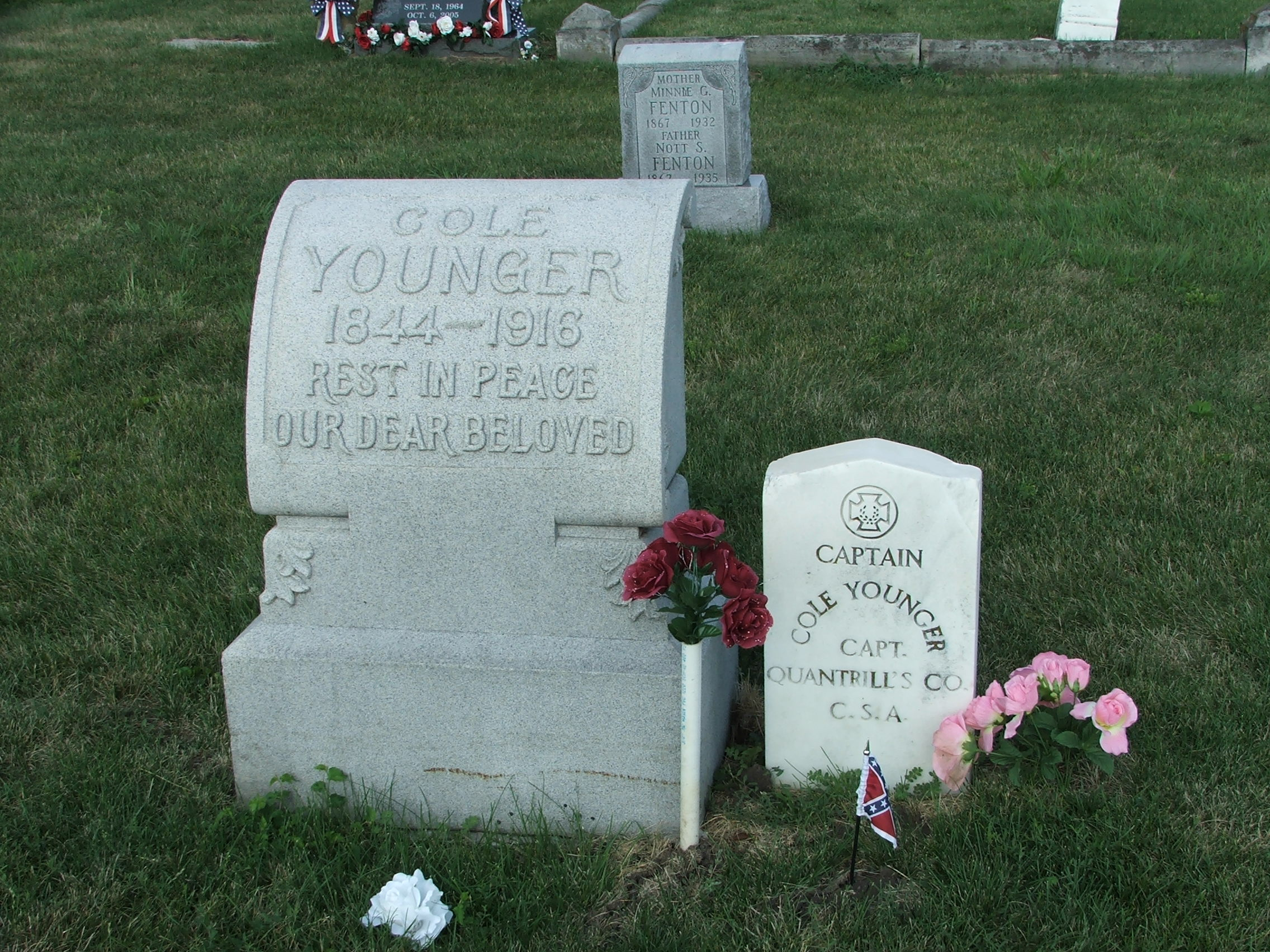
Cole Younger's grave

The remains of those who could not afford to purchase a family lot are buried in a potter's field. Many of the influenza victims of 1918, infants, and slaves, whose headstones, if they had them, have long eroded away, are buried in this section of the cemetery. There are currently 20,000 grave sites on 20 acres (81,000 m^{2}).

== Notable residents ==
Notable local people buried in the cemetery include Nicholas B. Langsford, Pleasant Lea, George Neal, William Bullitt Howard, William S. Cowherd, and former mayors from Lee's Summit and surrounding areas. Civil War veterans and several members of the Confederate guerrilla band known as Quantrill's Raiders were also buried there, including Cole Younger, a Confederate guerrilla who was born in Lee's Summit in 1844, and lived the final years of his life in the town before his death in 1916. He was buried in lot #12, with his brothers Jim and Bob and his mother, Bursheba, buried nearby.
