= Jim Younger =

American outlaw (1848–1902)

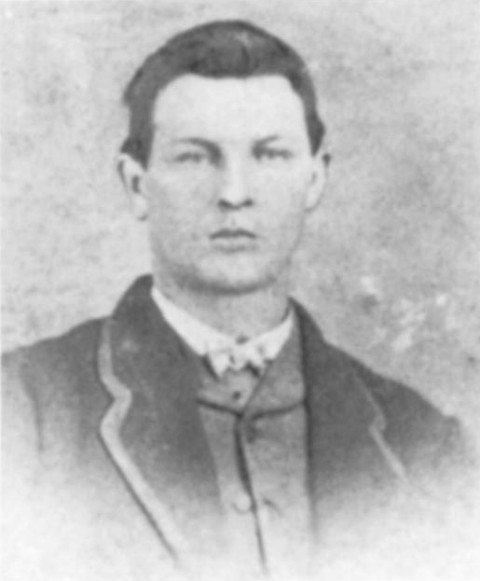
- Born: James Hardin Younger; January 15, 1848; Lee's Summit, Missouri, U.S.
- Died: October 19, 1902 (aged 54); St. Paul, Minnesota, U.S.
- Known for: Banditry
- Parent(s): Henry Washington Younger, Bersheba Leighton Fristoe
- Relatives: Cole Younger (brother); John Younger (brother); Bob Younger (brother)

A wounded Jim Younger after his arrest in 1876

James Hardin Younger (January 15, 1848 – October 19, 1902) was an American outlaw and member of the James–Younger Gang. He was the brother of Cole, John and Bob Younger.

== Life ==
Born in Missouri on January 15, 1848. Jim Younger was the ninth of fourteen children born to Henry Washington Younger and Bersheba Leighton Fristoe. With his brother Cole, he joined the Confederate Army during the American Civil War, eventually becoming a member of Quantrill's Raiders in 1864. Jim was later captured by Union troops, in the same ambush that resulted in William Quantrill's death, and was imprisoned at Alton prison as prisoner of war until the war's end, when he was paroled. After the war Jim tried his hand at various activities, including starting a horse ranch or deputy sheriff of Dallas County, Texas between 1870 and 1871. In 1873 he joined the James–Younger Gang, which was founded by Cole, along with Frank and Jesse James.

It's uncertain how much time he spent with the gang, but he was present when his brother John was killed by Pinkertons in Roscoe, Missouri in 1874. He left the gang and spent the next two years working a ranch in San Luis Obispo, California.

== Return to James–Younger Gang and death ==
Jim returned to the gang in time to join the ill-fated 1876 bank job in Northfield, Minnesota. Part of his jaw was shot off and he was captured and sentenced to life imprisonment. While in custody, Jim and Cole donated money for the creation of the Prison Mirror, one of the first prison newspapers in the US.

Along with Cole, he was paroled in 1901. After his release he became engaged to Alix Mueller, who had met him in prison 20 years after the Northfield robbery. Due to the terms of his parole, however, Jim could not marry. In 1900 he was listed as farmer in the census, and killed himself on October 19, 1902 in St. Paul, Minnesota. His body was returned to Lee's Summit, Missouri for burial.

== Film and television depiction ==
In 1941, Younger was portrayed by actor Arthur Kennedy in the film Bad Men of Missouri.

In 1950, Dewey Martin played Younger in the film Kansas Raiders, about his time spent with Quantrill's Raiders.

In 1954, Sheb Wooley played Younger in an episode of Jim Davis's syndicated western television series, Stories of the Century.

In the 1972 film The Great Northfield Minnesota Raid he was portrayed by Luke Askew.

In the 1980 film The Long Riders he was portrayed by Keith Carradine.

In the TV show Dr. Quinn, Medicine Woman, he was portrayed in the episode "Baby Outlaws" by Donnie Jeffcoat.

In the 2001 film American Outlaws he was portrayed by Gregory Smith.
