= Gratiot Military Prison =

Former military prison in St. Louis

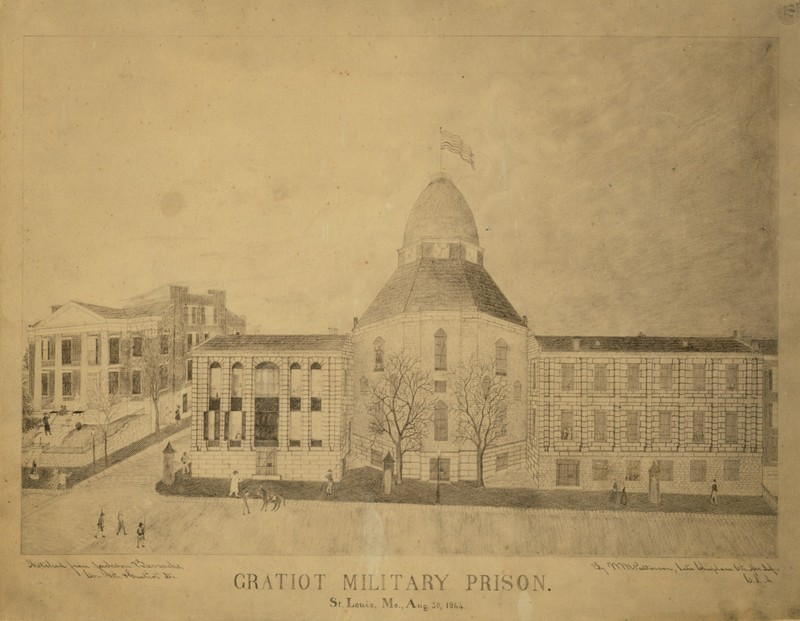

- Location in Missouri
- Location: St. Louis, Missouri; 38°37′12.7″N 90°11′49.9″W
- Status: Demolished (1878)
- Capacity: 1,200
- Opened: 1861
- Closed: 1865
- Managed by: United States Army

Notable prisoners
- M. Jeff Thompson

The Gratiot Military Prison, commonly known as the Gratiot Street Prison, was a military prison located in St. Louis, and the largest in Missouri at the time.

== History ==
Managed by the United States Army, the Gratiot Military Prison housed Confederate prisoners of war (POW), sympathizers, guerrillas, spies, and federal soldiers accused of crimes. It is well known for being the site of a daring breakout in the last days of the American Civil War. The prison building was previously a medical school named McDowell's College, which was confiscated by the Army and converted to a prison in December 1861. Its official capacity was 1,200 but at times it had 2,000 prisoners. It was used mostly as a transfer point for prisoners going to other U.S. military prisons. It was located at the corner of Gratiot and 8th Streets in St. Louis, and demolished in 1878.

The location is now the site of the Nestlé Purina PetCare corporate headquarters.

== See also ==
- List of Prisoner of War Camps in the American Civil War
