= Edward T. Miller (outlaw) =

American criminal

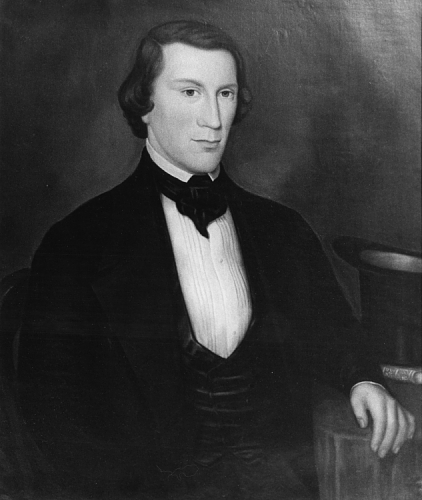
- Miller, c. 1880
- Born: c. 1856; Missouri
- Died: October 1881 (aged 24–25); Missouri
- Occupation: Outlaw
- Organization: James-Younger gang
- Relatives: Clell Miller

Edward T. Miller (ca. 1856 – October 1881) was an American outlaw who ran with Jesse James' gang.

== Biography ==
He was born around 1856, the son of Moses Miller and had an older brother, Clell Miller. Little is known about Miller, except that he took part in several robberies with Jesse James in Quantrill's Raiders, and especially after the downfall of Jesse's James-Younger gang. They robbed a train in Glendale, Missouri, in October 1879 and one in Blue Cut, Missouri in September 1881. He was sentenced to 10 years in the Missouri State Penitentiary, but was released when he turned state's evidence on Bill Ryan.

Miller was killed by Jesse James in October 1881 in Southwestern Missouri, close to the Arkansas line, confirmed by a former friend of the James brothers and authenticated by gentlemen from the country district who were in the city. Jim Bush, member of Quantrill's band, said that Ed Miller and Jim Cummings had both been running after the same woman and had a dispute about her. Jesse James interfered as their leader and warned them not to quarrel over a woman and go to killing each other when the gang needed all its resources for mutual aid and protection. Afterwards the name of Jesse was drawn into the woman scrape, one of the men alleging that Jesse was after her himself. Jesse heard of this, rode to where Miller was, met him near a camp which they had been using for a general rendezvous, and shot him without giving him a chance to defend himself. Miller's body was taken away that night and it was secretly buried.

According to some sources, Miller was killed for talking too much about the Kansas City Fair robbery, which took place in 1872. Others say Miller became drunk one night and told a Marshal about a train robbery that was to take place in the near future. The Times story speculated that a woman was involved. It is considered possible that the members of the gang have given rise to this rumor for reasons of their own, but it is hardly probable that the shooting took place almost in October.

== Popular culture ==
Ed Miller was portrayed by Dennis Quaid in the film The Long Riders (1980), and by Garret Dillahunt in The Assassination of Jesse James by the Coward Robert Ford (2007).
