= Clell Miller =

American outlaw

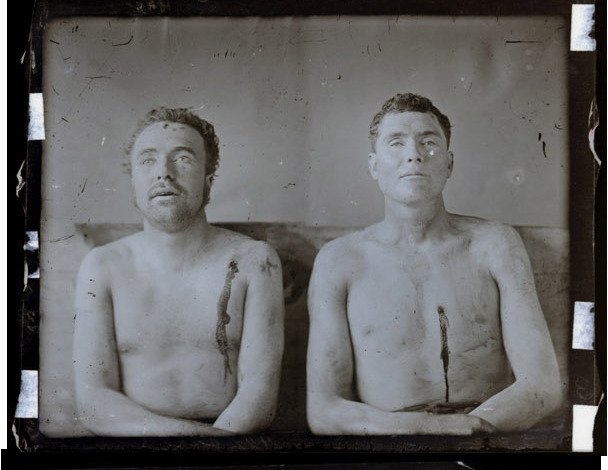
- Bodies of Clell Miller and Bill Chadwel
- Born: January 9, 1850 or December 15, 1849; Kearney, Missouri, US
- Died: September 7, 1876 (aged 26); Northfield, Minnesota, US
- Cause of death: Killed by townspeople while taking part in a robbery
- Resting place: Kearney
- Other names: Cleland D. Miller; Clenand Miller; McClelland Miller
- Allegiance: Bloody Bill Anderson (1864); James-Younger Gang (1871-1876)
- Criminal charges: Accused of guerrilla warfare, gang crimes, murder
- Penalty: Gratiot Street Prison (October 1864 - April 1865)

Clell Miller (1849 or 1850 – September 7, 1876) (also known as Cleland D. Miller or Clenand Miller or McClelland Miller) was an outlaw with the James-Younger Gang who was killed during the gang's robbery at Northfield, Minnesota.

Miller was born on either January 9, 1850 (the date on his tombstone), or December 15, 1849, in Kearney, Missouri. His younger brother Edward T. Miller also joined the gang and was allegedly killed by Jesse James in 1881.

== Guerilla career ==
At the age of 14, Clell Miller joined Bloody Bill Anderson's guerrillas during the American Civil War. He was captured during the skirmish in which Anderson was killed on October 26, 1864. This was Miller's first and only wartime combat. Because of his youth, he was sent to St. Louis, Missouri, at the Gratiot Street Prison.

His father obtained his release in April 1865, perjuring himself by saying the family had always been Union supporters. Miller was described as being 5 feet 8 inches tall, with dark reddish auburn hair.

== Outlaw career ==
The following James gang events were allegedly attributed to Miller:

- June 3, 1871 - Ocobock Brothers' Bank at Corydon, Iowa. The Pinkerton Detective Agency was hired to pursue the gang and Miller was captured in July by a detective Westphal. He posted bail and was later acquitted after a long list of witnesses testified he was elsewhere at the time of the robbery. He was represented by attorney John McClanahan of Corydon, Iowa. A deposition from the trial is owned by the McClanahan family. Clell denied being in the James gang, but said later that he 'might as well join them because his reputation had been ruined by the trial'.
- April 29, 1872 - Bank of Columbia at Columbia, Kentucky. Cashier R. A. C. Martin was killed and bystander James Garrett wounded.
- May 27, 1873 - Ste. Genevieve Savings Bank at Ste. Genevieve, Missouri.
- January 15, 1874 - Stagecoach at Hot Springs, Arkansas.
- January 31, 1874 - Train at Gad's Hill, Missouri.
- February 1874 - Craig and Son General Store of Bentonville, Arkansas;.
- April/May 1874 - Stagecoach at Austin, Texas.
- December 8, 1874 - Kansas Pacific Railroad at Muncie, Kansas.
- April 12, 1875 - The killing of Daniel Askew, a neighbour in Kearney who was allegedly helping the Pinkertons.
- Late April 1875 - The killing of a Pinkerton agent Jack Ladd.
- July 7, 1876 - Missouri Pacific Railroad robbery at Otterville, Missouri.

== Death ==
On September 7, 1876, Miller was shot and killed by Henry M. Wheeler in the robbery attempt on the First National Bank of Northfield, along with outlaw Bill Chadwell and bank cashier Joseph Lee Heywood and citizen Nicholas Gustavson. Wounded in the fight were Frank James, Jesse James, Charlie Pitts (later killed), Cole Younger, Jim Younger, Bob Younger and Northfield citizen Alonzo E. Bunker.

Miller's body was photographed and then buried in Northfield. However, his father claimed the body and Miller was buried at Muddy Fork Cemetery in Kearney.

Both of the bodies of Clell Miller and Bill Chadwell were exhumed the following night and were put into wooden barrels. The barrels were shipped to the medical school in Ann Arbor, Michigan on September 9, 1876, labelled as "Paint". The 22-year-old medical student, Henry M. Wheeler, used them as cadavers and displayed the skeleton of Clell Miller in his office in Grand Forks, North Dakota until his death.

In 2013 what may have been the skeletal remains of Miller from North Dakota were investigated to confirm identity.

== Cultural depictions ==
Television and film depictions of Clell Miller include:

- The Great Missouri Raid (1951) - portrayed by Guy Wilkerson
- Utah Blaine (1957) - portrayed by Jack Ingram
- The True Story of Jesse James (1957) - portrayed by Louis Zito
- Rawhide (1964) - portrayed by Ben Cooper
- The Legend of Jesse James (1966) - portrayed by Armand Alzamora
- The Great Northfield Minnesota Raid (1972) - portrayed by R.G. Armstrong
- The Long Riders (1980) - portrayed by Randy Quaid
- Frank & Jesse (1995) - portrayed by John Pyper-Ferguson
- American Outlaws (2001) - portrayed Ty O'Neal
