= Henry Washington Younger =

Missouri man

Henry Younger
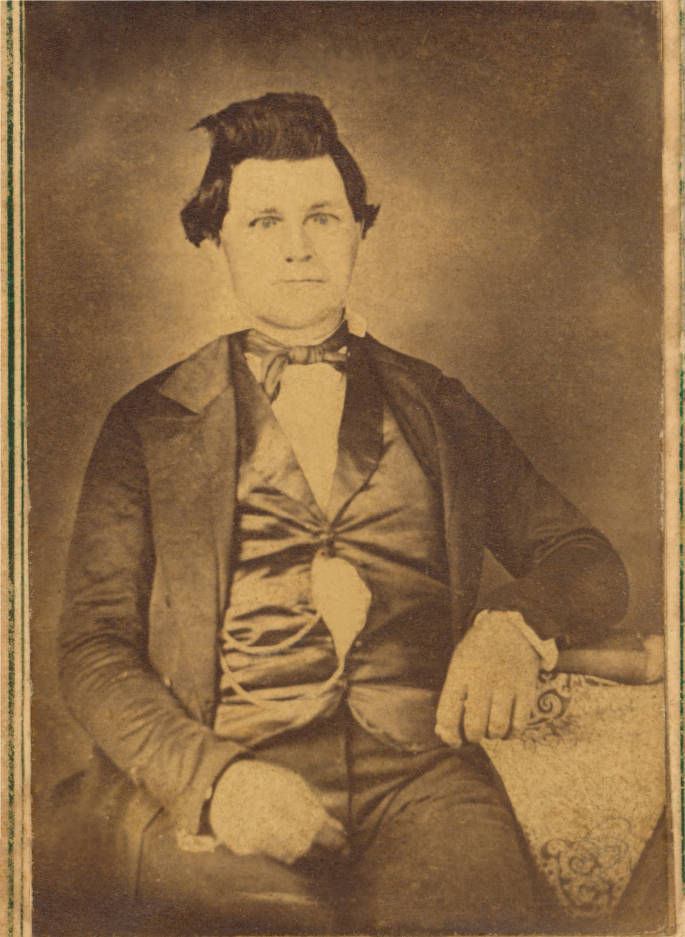
- Henry Washington Younger c. 1860
- Born: Henry Washington Younger; February 22, 1810; Crab Orchard, Lincoln County, Kentucky, US
- Died: July 20, 1862 (aged 52); Westport, Missouri, US
- Known for: Father of the notable Younger outlaws
- Spouse: Bersheba Leighton Fristoe
- Children: 14 (see text)
- Parent(s): Charles Lee Younger, Sarah Sullivan Purcell

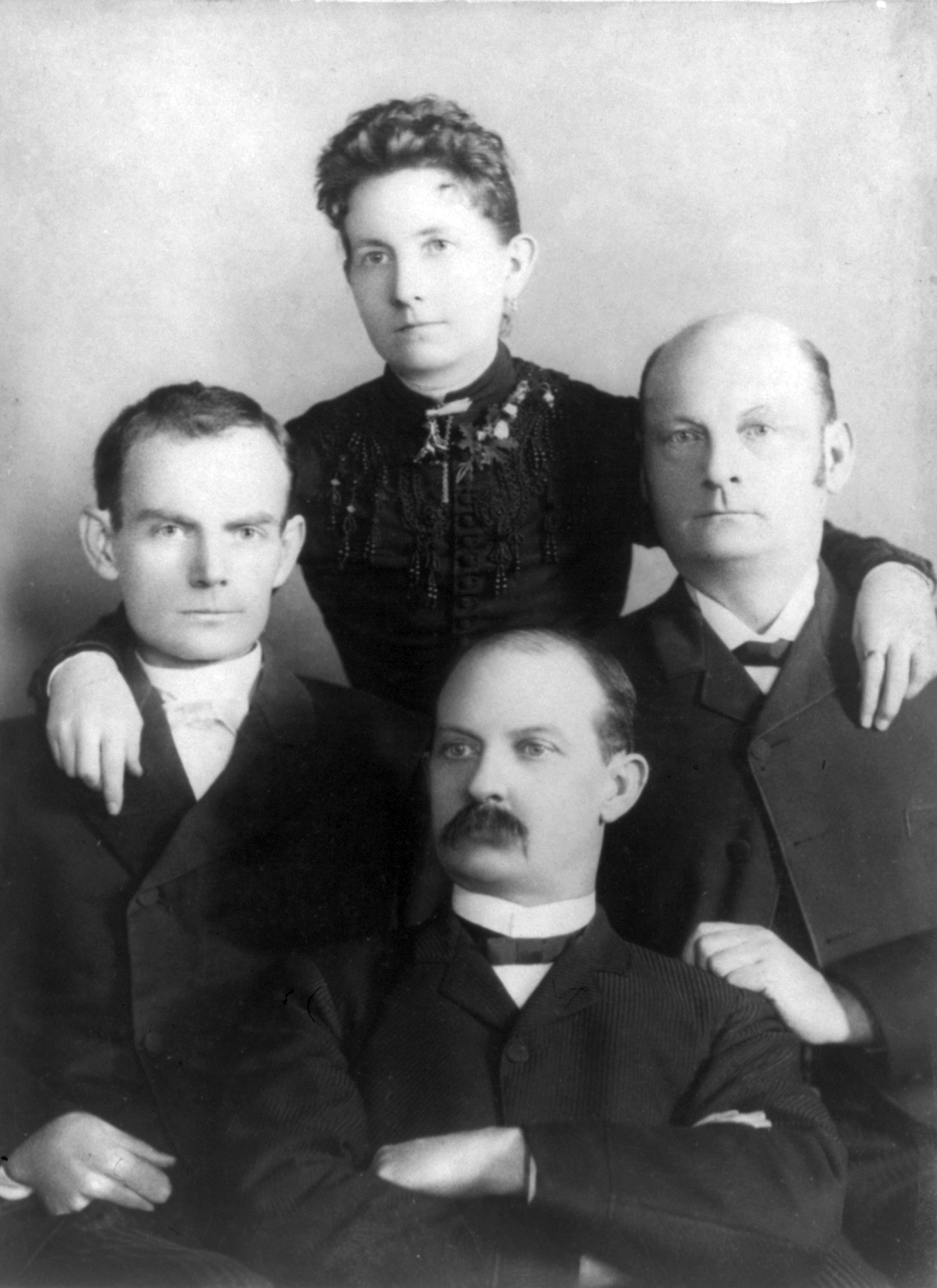
Sitting left-to-right: Bob, Jim and Cole Younger, with their sister Henrietta

Henry Washington Younger (February 22, 1810 – July 20, 1862) was a businessman and father to the Younger outlaws Cole, Jim, John and Bob. He was the father of fourteen children. He was the son of Colonel Charles Lee Younger and Sarah Sullivan Purcell and married Bersheba Leighton Fristoe in about 1830.

== Henry and Bersheba Younger's Children ==
- Laura Helen Younger (born 1 January 1832)
- Frances Isabelle Younger (born March 1833)
- Martha Ann (Annie) Younger (born 9 January 1835)
- Charles Richard (Dick) Younger (born about 1838, died 17 August 1860)
- Mary Josephine Younger (born about 1840)
- Caroline (Duck) Younger (born about 1842)
- Thomas Coleman (Cole) Younger (born 15 January 1844)
- Sarah Ann (Sally) Younger (born 2 September 1846)
- James Hardin (Jim) Younger (born 15 January 1848)
- Alphae Younger (born about 1850, died about 1852)
- John Harrison Younger (born about 1851)
- Emily J. Younger (born about 1852)
- Robert Ewing (Bob) Younger (born 29 October 1853)
- Henrietta (Retta) Younger (born 9 January 1857)

== Family life and death ==
Henry Washington Younger was born in Crab Orchard, Lincoln County, Kentucky. The family moved to Harrisonville in 1857, and in 1859 Henry was assigned as second mayor of the city.

He was frequently robbed and lost a lot of money. This angered his son Cole who thought he should make a stand. On July 20, 1862 Henry was traveling from Kansas City after a business trip while carrying $1,500 (~$48,375 in 2025) on his person. About one mile south of Westport he was shot three times in the back and killed. It was discovered the killing was politically motivated and not a robbery.

The body was returned to the Youngers who, afraid Union servicemen would dig it up, buried him in an unknown grave.

Younger Family Y-DNA Project

The Younger Y-DNA Project has identified several different Younger families in the United States and found that the common ancestor of the Younger Gang's family is Humphrey Younger (c. 1677 - 1740). Humphrey Younger immigrated to Kent County, Maryland and his descendants included the Younger brothers Cole, John, Jim, and Bob who rode with the outlaw Jesse James. The connected Younger families include the descendants of Captain John W. Younger (c.1773 - 1858), a War of 1812 veteran, Joshua Younger (c.1752 - unknown), and Tiller Younger (c. 1700s - unknown), a Revolutionary War veteran and son of Humphrey Younger based on Y-DNA connections. The Younger family's haplogroup is J-M172.
