= William Bullitt Howard =

American slave owner and land owner

William Bullitt Howard (March 10, 1821 – July 13, 1896) was a plantation owner, slave owner, stock raiser, entrepreneur, and founder of Lee's Summit, Missouri.

== Life ==
Born in Jefferson County, Kentucky, Howard moved to Jackson County, Missouri in 1842 on 220 acres which he previously purchased. In 1865 he founded the settlement of Strother (now known as Lee's Summit) on his own land.
