= John Younger =

American outlaw (1851–1874)

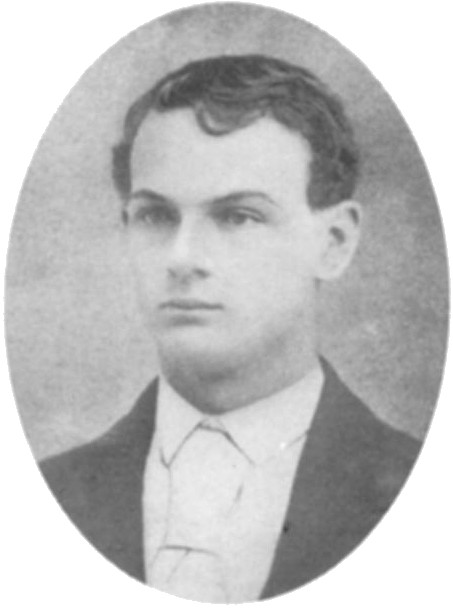
- John Younger
- Born: John Harrison Younger c. 1851; Lee's Summit, Jackson County, Missouri, USA
- Died: March 17, 1874 (aged 22–23); St. Clair County, Missouri, USA
- Resting place: Roscoe, Missouri, St. Clair County, Missouri, US
- Known for: Banditry
- Parent(s): Henry Washington Younger, Bersheba Leighton Fristoe
- Relatives: Jim Younger (brother); Cole Younger (brother); Bob Younger (brother)

John Harrison Younger (c. 1851 – March 17, 1874) was an American outlaw and, briefly, a member of the James–Younger Gang. The gang also included his brothers Cole, Jim and Bob Younger and the infamous Jesse James.

== Origins ==
He was the 11th child of Henry Washington Younger and Bersheba Leighton Fristoe's 14 children and their fifth son, the fourth to survive into adulthood.

In July 1862, his father was shot and killed while on a business trip to Kansas City by a detachment of Union militiamen. As a result of this killing, several of John's brothers joined Quantrill's Raiders, but John and his younger brother Bob were too young to join so they stayed at home to look after their mother and sisters.

== Killing of Gillcreas ==
In January 1866, Bob and John took their mother to Independence, Missouri, to purchase winter supplies. An ex-soldier named Gillcreas, recognizing the family from his military days, came up to the wagon and made some negative comments about Cole and Jim.

When John told him to be quiet, Gillcreas proceeded to slap him about the face with a frozen fish. John shot the soldier between the eyes with a pistol. Gillcreas was found to be carrying a heavy slingshot that still was tied to his wrist. The killing was ruled as self-defense.

== Texas and Missouri ==
The younger Younger brothers took Bersheba to Sherman, Texas to get away from continued harassment in Jackson County. When Bersheba fell ill, the boys (except for Cole) took her back to Missouri for her final days.

As soon as they arrived in Jackson County, they were attacked in their home. Bob was knocked unconscious, and John was hanged four times, and the fourth time they hanged him the rope dug deep into his flesh. They cut him down and hacked at the body with knives. He survived. After witnessing this violence, Bersheba died on June 6, 1870, her 54th birthday.

After Bersheba's funeral, John and Bob met up with Jim. Because it was not safe to stay in one place, they often moved between Missouri and Texas.

On January 20, 1871, John shot and killed two Texas deputy sheriffs.

== James–Younger Gang ==
In 1873 Jim, John and Bob Younger joined the James–Younger Gang.

== Death ==
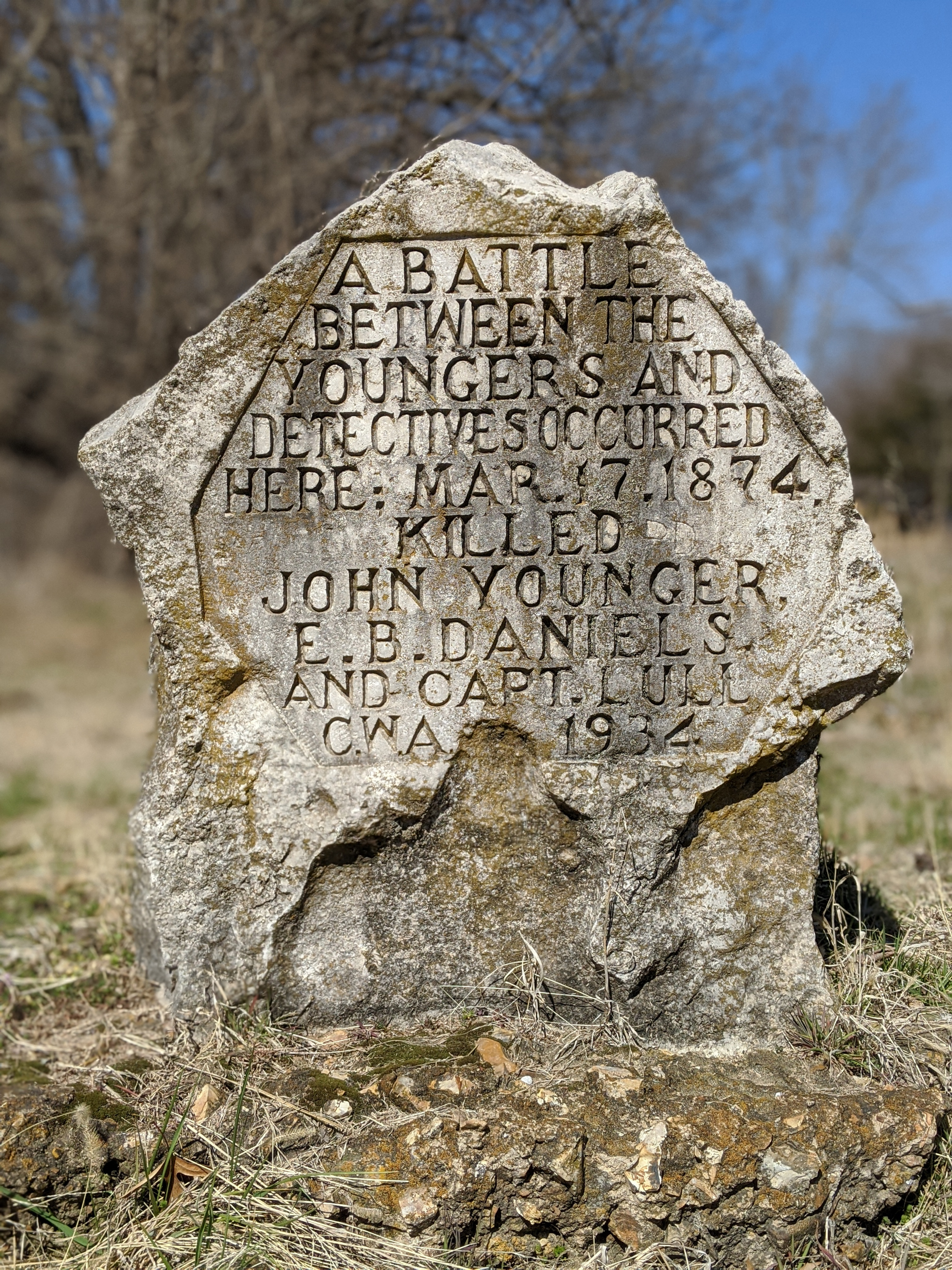
Civil Works Administration marker: "A battle between the Youngers and detectives occurred here. Mar.17.1874. Killed - John Younger, E.B. Daniels and Capt. Lull C.W.A. 1934"

On March 17, 1874, Jim and John were headed to some friends in Roscoe, Missouri. Three men, local deputy sheriff Edward Daniels and two Pinkerton detectives asked them for directions. Suspecting that they were detectives Jim and John ambushed them. One of the agents fled. While interviewing the remaining two, the detective, Louis Lull, drew a hidden pistol and shot John through the neck. Jim killed Deputy Daniels, while John pursued Lull on horseback to nearby woods, fatally wounding him in the chest. Emerging from the woods still on horseback, as Jim ran towards him, John swayed and fell dead. Jim buried him by the roadside to avoid the law digging him up. Later he removed his body to bury him in an unmarked grave in the cemetery. Louis Lull died three days later. John Younger is buried in the Yeater-Cleveland Cemetery in St. Clair County, Missouri, about 4–5 miles NW of Osceola, MO.
