= Web Therapy season 3 =

Web Therapy
- Season 3
- No. of episodes: 10

Release
- Original network: Showtime
- Original release: July 23 – September 24, 2013

Season chronology
- ← Previous; Season 2 Next → Season 4

The third season of the American Improvisational comedy television series Web Therapy premiered on July 23, 2013, and concluded on September 24, 2013, on Showtime. The series stars Lisa Kudrow as Fiona Wallice, a therapist who has conceived of a new form of therapy: the titular "web therapy". This season contains the webisodes from season five of the web series.

== Plot ==
After Kip's disastrous campaign which has resulted in him moving in with Ben in New Mexico and the revelation that Austen got Gina pregnant, Fiona takes some time off and relaxes at a beach resort in California where she has a casual fling with Jackson Pickett; only to get annoyed when he imagines a future between the two of them. Jerome continues work for Putsy and reveals to Fiona that Google wants to buy Net Therapy for a seven-figure deal. With Hayley working as Fiona's new assistant and overseeing the new musical simultaneously in New York, Fiona meets the musical's songwriter, Franny Marshall, whose songs are threatening to Fiona's appearance. In an attempt to save her image, Fiona gets Franny drunk and replaces the original songs with more enlightening ones, convincing Franny that there is potential in them.

When Austen, whom Fiona is still angry with, reveals that he plans to marry Gina to secure a legitimate heir for himself, he earns Fiona's forgiveness by buying her a penthouse in New York City, and also helps Fiona out by buying Net Therapy and shelving it; in return, Fiona helps Austen and Gina draw a prenup which allows Gina to take advantage of the money and jets. Jerome feels insulted by Putsy and returns to work at Web Therapy with a reduced salary. When the musical loses its investors and Franny becomes a hit songwriter working with famous pop stars, Jackson reveals that he is part of a company who wishes to invest in the musical. Wanting him to back off for good, Fiona exposes Jackson to his clients as a misogynist cult leader and scammer. However, she is annoyed when Hayley uses her New York penthouse to entertain various clients; which causes Jerome to feel lonely.

With Kip and Fiona forced by Ben to file for divorce, Fiona is investigated for the misuse of campaign finances and suspects that Ben is responsible. Seeking to prove her innocence, Fiona asks Richard for help retrieving the campaign records. However, he reveals that Ben ordered all campaign materials to be destroyed and refuses further contact with her. Fiona then asks Richard's pregnant now-wife Robin for the footage she captured while illegally documenting the campaign. After Robin and Fiona meet at a gala event for the transaction, Fiona reviews the video footage, which depicts Ben as a controlling, vindictive and irresponsible man. Seeking further evidence, Fiona needs passwords to the campaign accounts that are located in Kip's briefcase, which Hayley unknowingly sold in a box of campaign items to a buyer at a yard sale who sells it on eBay to Karen Sharpe, a hoarder who keeps tons of memorabilia from the campaign. Fiona meets with Karen and successfully convinces her to hand over the passwords from the briefcase; also discovering a shredded diary in Karen's possession that further implicates Ben. After Fiona retrieves the diary and hands over the evidence, Ben takes a plea deal for poor management in exchange for a lighter prison sentence.

Meanwhile, Robin reveals to Fiona that she had captured footage at the event which implicates Austen in a mass cell-phone hacking conspiracy, and rebuffs Fiona's demands to hand over the footage. When Fiona goes to Richard for help controlling Robin, he refuses to help her and reveals that he is secretly working for drug lords in the Russian mafia at a warehouse. Discovering that Richard's new job is putting him in danger, Fiona meets with the FBI, who shut down the operation and place a grateful Richard and a furious Robin into the witness protection program.

Fiona continues her branch of therapy by treating her transgender ex-husband who attempts to embarrass her in a reality show, an online gambler, a couple who have never met in person, and a woman who has trouble with an office romance. Near the end of the season, after Gina marries Austen and gives birth to her son Angus, Jerome realizes that the baby is his own; having had sex with her while visiting her previous office in Alaska nine months prior. After Gina agrees to a divorce, Austen proposes to Fiona; but when he reveals that he has given his fortune away and wants her to live with him in a mud hut in Africa, she breaks up with him. Jerome then receives $20,000,000 from Austen for Angus's trust fund, and he, Hayley and Gina make plans to move into the luxurious house next door to Fiona to raise Angus together.

Near the end of their divorce, Kip reveals to Fiona that he has tried dating other women to move on from both her and Ben, and that he may be moving back to Philadelphia to restart his law practice. When the two realize that their problems had increased when they were apart, they decide to call off the divorce. Putsy tells Fiona that she has written a book on senior abuse which depicts Fiona as the villain, and also reveals that she will be moving in with Fiona, having been given approval by Kip, and plans to help him get appointed as a justice on the Supreme Court using her connections. After the book becomes a success, Fiona contacts the book's publicist, Gareth Pink, who tells Fiona that Putsy has moved in to the New York penthouse to capitalize on the publicity. He also reveals to Fiona that he and Putsy are getting married and the two will bring down Web Therapy together.

== Cast ==
=== Regular cast ===
- Lisa Kudrow as Fiona Wallice (10 episodes)
- Dan Bucatinsky as Jerome Sokoloff (8 episodes)
- Jennifer Elise Cox as Gina Spinks (5 episodes)
- Alan Cumming as Austen Clarke (4 episodes)
- Julie Claire as Robin Griner (4 episodes)
- Victor Garber as Kip Wallice (4 episodes)
- Michael McDonald as Ben Tomlund (3 episodes)
- Tim Bagley as Richard Pratt (3 episodes)
- Lily Tomlin as Putsy Hodge (3 episodes)

=== Guest cast ===
- Steve Carell as Jackson Pickett (3 episodes)
- Megan Mullally as Franny Marshall (3 episodes)
- Chelsea Handler as Chris Endicott (Christopher Palmer) (3 episodes)
- Meg Ryan as Karen Sharpe (2 episodes)
- Darren Criss as Augie Sayles (2 episodes)
- Mae Whitman as Blair Yellin (2 episodes)
- Matt LeBlanc as Nick Jericho (2 episodes)
- Sara Gilbert as Sylvie Frank (2 episodes)
- Billy Crystal as Garreth Pink (1 episode)

The actors are not distinguished between regular and guest cast in the show. Regular cast here refers to the actors who appear throughout the series while guest cast appear only in one or a few episodes.

== Production ==
On November 16, 2012, Showtime renewed Web Therapy for a third season to consist of 10 episodes, which premiered on July 23, 2013. Guest stars for this season included Matt LeBlanc as Nick Jericho, an online gambling addict; Meg Ryan as Karen Sharpe, a hoarder who has an unhealthy obsession with Kip; Jesse Tyler Ferguson as Steve Olson, a paranoid lottery winner.; Steve Carell as Jackson Pickett, a quasi-religious cult leader who takes an interest in Fiona; Megan Mullally as Franny Marshall, the composer/lyricist of the planned Broadway musical of Fiona's book; Billy Crystal as Garreth Pink, the publicist of the book that Fiona co-wrote with her mother; Chelsea Handler as Chris Endicott, Fiona's ex-husband who is now a woman after gender reassignment surgery; Sara Gilbert as Sylvie Frank, a distraught marketing specialist; Nina García as herself, Mae Whitman as Blair Yellin, and Darren Criss as Augie Sayles. Dan Bucatinsky, Victor Garber, Alan Cumming, Jennifer Elise Cox, Lily Tomlin, Julie Claire, Michael McDonald and Tim Bagley also reprised their roles this season. Rashida Jones, who made one appearance for each of the previous two seasons as Hayley, did not reprise her role for this season.

Unlike the previous two seasons, where each season contained both the original sessions from the web series and new scenes shot afterwards specifically to link the sessions together and introduce new storylines for the TV series, this season was filmed as one season specifically for television broadcast and is being broadcast in two forms: a series of webisodes and a series of television episodes. However, the wrap-around scenes and the sessions featuring Carell, Crystal, Tomlin and García are exclusive to the TV series.

== Episodes ==
No. overall	No. in season	Title	Directed by	Written by	Original release date
22	1	"Relax, Reboot, Revenge"	Don Roos	Lisa Kudrow, Don Roos & Dan Bucatinsky	July 23, 2013
Following a series of disturbing events, Fiona takes time out from her career and personal life and relaxes at a Beach Resort with fellow guest Jackson Pickett (Steve Carell); Austen asks Fiona for forgiveness; Franny Marshall (Megan Mullally) shows Fiona the songs for the musical movie she's been writing. Guest cast: Steve Carell and Megan Mullally
23	2	"Who Doesn't Love Musicals"	Don Roos	Lisa Kudrow, Don Roos & Dan Bucatinsky	July 30, 2013
In order to get viewed differently in the movie, Fiona begins helping Franny write her songs; Fiona calls Ben and Kip in New Mexico, and to save herself from another scandal, turns to a married Richard for help; Jerome asks for his old position back. Meanwhile, Fiona tries to end her fling with Jackson before it gets too serious. Guest cast: Steve Carell and Megan Mullally
24	3	"Believe it or Not"	Don Roos	Lisa Kudrow, Don Roos & Dan Bucatinsky	August 6, 2013
Franny becomes a song writer for Lady Gaga with the songs Fiona co-wrote with her; The musical loses its investors and Fiona learns that a new investor is Jackson; Fiona tries to get footage from Robin which may prove her innocence. Guest cast: Steve Carell and Megan Mullally
25	4	"Case Files"	Don Roos	Lisa Kudrow, Don Roos & Dan Bucatinsky	August 13, 2013
With production of the musical movie being put on hold indefinitely and Jackson off her back, Fiona needs the passwords for the campaign finance account and discovers that the passwords are in a brief case purchased by a hoarder (Meg Ryan); Gina discusses her wedding with Fiona. Guest cast: Meg Ryan
26	5	"Stage Struck"	Don Roos	Lisa Kudrow, Don Roos & Dan Bucatinsky	August 20, 2013
Fiona receives the passwords and is alerted of some strange footage of Austen through Robin; Richard confesses his true feelings about Robin and tells Fiona of his new career. Guest cast: Meg Ryan
27	6	"Love Stories"	Don Roos	Lisa Kudrow, Don Roos & Dan Bucatinsky	August 27, 2013
Fiona does therapy with Blair (Mae Whitman) and Augie (Darren Criss) who are a couple whose relationship only exists online; Robin and Richard enter the witness protection program. Guest cast: Darren Criss and Mae Whitman
28	7	"Games People Play"	Don Roos	Lisa Kudrow, Don Roos & Dan Bucatinsky	September 3, 2013
Nick Jericho (Matt LeBlanc) calls Fiona with his online gambling addiction; Augie and Blair meet in person despite Fiona's advice; Fiona does therapy with a woman who has trouble with an office romance. Guest cast: Darren Criss, Mae Whitman, Matt LeBlanc, Sara Gilbert, Chelsea Handler
29	8	"Husband Hunting"	Don Roos	Lisa Kudrow, Don Roos & Dan Bucatinsky	September 10, 2013
Fiona's college romance Chris (Chelsea Handler) who went through a sex-change operation calls to get back 20 years of alimony payments; Sylvie tells Fiona good news relating to her office romance; Gina goes into labor. Guest cast: Matt LeBlanc, Sara Gilbert, Chelsea Handler
30	9	"Affairs to Remember"	Don Roos	Lisa Kudrow, Don Roos & Dan Bucatinsky	September 17, 2013
Jerome receives some news that will change his life; Putsy tells Fiona that she is writing a book on senior abuse; Chris tries to get a show on the air with embarrassing footage of Fiona. Guest cast: Chelsea Handler
31	10	"No Place Like Home"	Don Roos	Lisa Kudrow, Don Roos & Dan Bucatinsky	September 24, 2013
Austen tells Fiona of their possible new lifestyle; Jerome receives a windfall of cash; Putsy wants to move into Fiona's house; The publicist of Putsy's book (Billy Crystal) meets with Fiona and gives her unsettling news. Guest cast: Billy Crystal
