= Web Therapy season 1 =

Web Therapy
- Season 1
- No. of episodes: 10

Release
- Original network: Showtime
- Original release: July 19 – September 20, 2011

Season chronology
- Next → Season 2

The first season of the American Improvisational comedy television series Web Therapy premiered on July 19, 2011, and concluded on September 20, 2011 on Showtime. The series stars Lisa Kudrow as Fiona Wallice, a therapist who has conceived of a new form of therapy: the titular "web therapy". This season contains the webisodes from seasons one and two of the web series.

== Plot ==
The season starts with Fiona Wallice setting up her new therapy business on the internet. Some of her first few clients include Richard Pratt, an old co-worker of hers who has a crush on her, Gina Spinks, the ditsy receptionist at Fiona's former workplace the Lachman Brothers, and Jerome Sokoloff, who is, in her own opinion, boring. Having left her previous career in finance, Fiona hopes to have her former bosses the Lachman Brothers invest in her new online business, and Fiona has Kamal Prakash, an IT worker at Kip's office, help her in setting up her business and teach her how to record her sessions. He records various testimonials with her clients, including Jerome and Gina. He and Gina flirt during the recording of her testimonials, which greatly irritates Fiona, and they start dating soon after.

When her web therapy success starts to blossom, she gets high-profile clients in an Internet psychic, a woman doing promotional advertising for products, and Ted Mitchell, a therapist who is sent to monitor her by the Lachman Brothers and later recommends some of his clients to her. A minor setback occurs when a couple records their sessions with her, giving false information, and publishes them without her consent. Even after they put a link to Web Therapy onto the site to resolve this, Kip, Fiona's husband of nearly 17 years, worries that Fiona's Web Therapy is ruining his and her reputation, and orders her to shut it down, but she does not comply.

Another hindering in Fiona's business is her mother, Putsy Hodge, who dislikes Web Therapy and is quick to let her know. She reveals she took in a son who she put up for adoption long before marrying Fiona's father; said man is exposed as a fake after attempting to steal from Fiona and Kip. Fiona also sees that Putsy is starting to become unstable and worries for her, and tries to declare her insane in order to give her the best care. Putsy is not happy and decides she wants nothing to do with Fiona for a while.

Fiona soon finds a rival in Robin Griner, who happens to know Kip and is planning to have sex with him during his weekend business trip in Atlanta. Despite Fiona's attempts to warn her that Kip will not cheat on his wife, Robin goes through with it and returns home dejected after he turns her down. She tells Fiona that Kip only hit on her because he thought she was a transvestite. This leaves Fiona confused, and while she coaches Jerome on being assertive, she discovers that he works at Visa, the credit card company. Fiona asks him to track all of the purchases in Kip's account, which turn out to include downtown areas such as cocktail lounges, coffeehouses, Guns n' Poses novelty retail boutique, various purchases at Manly and Lacey's, and Midnight Tram to Georgia, among other things. This causes Fiona to begin re-evaluating her marriage, while Jerome's assertiveness at work alienates his co-workers and ultimately costs him his job. Somewhat sympathetic about his job loss and discovering how useful he is, Fiona hires him as her assistant.

Disturbed by the state of her marriage, Fiona contacts Kamal and asks him to fax her some information on Kip's financial reports. He faxes the information over to Fiona, demanding a payment for his overall services. Since Fiona does not have enough resources to pay the past due invoices, she asks Gina to distract him by meeting his parents while she comes up with the money. This leads to the end of their relationship, however; Kamal's parents disapprove of Gina and are appalled to hear of their son's apparent confusing sexual fantasies, caused by a leaked test session video between him and Fiona, so they send him back to India to go ahead with his arranged marriage. Around the same time, the Security Exchange Commission starts an investigation into the financial assets of the Lachman Brothers and the employees are forced to erase everything on their computers, which hinders the investment in Web Therapy. With Gina forced to care for the suicidal CFO, Fiona is contacted by her former boss Robert Lachman, who is under house arrest and asks her to help him use their sessions in addiction therapy as documentation to appear more sympathetic to the investigators, offering to help her investment in return. When SEC agents later contact Fiona about deposing her former workplace, she agrees to co-operate and cuts off contact with Robert, much to his anger. At this point, Fiona starts work on her semi-autobiographical book entitled Whistling While I Worked, based on her life and career at Lachman Brothers, and Jerome helps her in writing the book by compiling mementos and journals she had kept throughout her life.

Soon, Fiona meets media mogul and philanthropist Austen Clarke, who is one of Ted's clients. Austen has a problem with relationships due to his busy lifestyle, but admits that he is much more interested in connecting emotionally with people than sleeping with them. Fiona is amazed at how he seems to be a perfect person; he does not want to settle down and have kids, and she is just about to consider breaking off her marriage. Later, Fiona's book receives some publication offers and she contacts Austen for help on deciding which offer to choose. Whilst emailing him the offers, she accidentally sends a copy of the book as well, and he is touched to find that she has dedicated the book to him. He offers to publish the book for her, and later that night, they meet on his plane and have a rendezvous on their way to Bali. When Kip contacts Fiona, she tells him that she is leaving him for Austen and confronts him on his recent behavior. He denies being gay, claiming that there is a conspiracy against him and that he bought the items for a co-worker's bachelor party. He also tells her that he has high chances of becoming a Republican Congressman for District 17; Fiona can be the wife of a Congressman, just like she wanted since they first started dating, but only if she stays married to him. While Austen is devastated, Kip tells him that he would appreciate his endorsement for the campaign, and assures him that he only needs Fiona for the election, and wants her to try rebuilding their marriage, at least for the sake of his career. The season ends with Fiona in shock, confused as to what to do.

== Cast ==
=== Regular cast ===
- Lisa Kudrow as Fiona Wallice (10 episodes)
- Dan Bucatinsky as Jerome Sokoloff (7 episodes)
- Victor Garber as Kip Wallice (6 episodes)
- Jennifer Elise Cox as Gina Spinks (4 episodes)
- Lily Tomlin as Putsy Hodge (4 episodes)
- Tim Bagley as Richard Pratt (2 episodes)
- Julie Claire as Robin Griner (2 episodes)
- Rashida Jones as Hayley Feldman-Tate (2 episodes, including one uncredited voice appearance)
- Alan Cumming as Austen Clarke (1 episode)

=== Guest cast ===
- Maulik Pancholy as Kamal Prakash (4 episodes)
- Patty Guggenheim as Bryn (2 episodes)
- Drew Sherman as Justin Fein (2 episodes)
- Steven Weber as Robert Lachman (2 episodes)
- Bob Balaban as Ted Mitchell (1 episode)
- Jane Lynch as Claire Dudek (1 episode)
- Courteney Cox as Serena Duvall (1 episode)
- Patrick Curran as Agent Whitaker (1 episode)

The actors are not distinguished between regular and guest cast in the show. Regular cast here refers to the actors who appear throughout the series while guest cast appear only in one or a few episodes.

== Episodes ==
No. overall	No. in season	Title	Directed by	Written by	Original release date
1	1	"Click to Start"	Don Roos	Lisa Kudrow, Don Roos & Dan Bucatinsky	July 19, 2011
Fiona Wallice (Lisa Kudrow) develops a new brand of therapy for the internet in which she has called Web Therapy, and to generate interest, Fiona contacts one of her past employers, with whom she has had an unfortunate past. Fiona also takes on a new client who has a very promotable problem, which could help with the success of Web Therapy. Regular cast first appearance: Lisa Kudrow, Victor Garber, Tim Bagley, Jennifer Elise Cox and Dan Bucatinsky
2	2	"Desperate Measures"	Don Roos	Lisa Kudrow, Don Roos & Dan Bucatinsky	July 26, 2011
Fiona tries to exploit the issues of her client Jerome (Dan Bucatinsky), in order to impress her former boss and potential investor. Meanwhile, when Fiona is facing problems in her marriage, she starts to flirt with several other men. Regular cast first appearance: Rashida Jones Guest cast: Maulik Pancholy
3	3	"Shrink Rap"	Don Roos	Lisa Kudrow, Don Roos & Dan Bucatinsky	August 2, 2011
When Fiona's mother (Lily Tomlin) rejects her business proposal, Fiona encounters another obstacle: Ted Mitchell (Bob Balaban), who has been hired by the Lachmen Brothers to evaluate Fiona's techniques, which leads to Ted getting a lot more that he bargained for. Regular cast first appearance: Lily Tomlin Guest cast: Bob Balaban
4	4	"Public Relations"	Don Roos	Lisa Kudrow, Don Roos & Dan Bucatinsky	August 9, 2011
When Fiona begins treating a woman who was court ordered to do therapy (Jane Lynch), she sees an opportunity to exploit her patient to help with Web Therapy. Fiona also treats a man who is jealous of his wife. Guest cast: Patty Guggenheim, Drew Sherman and Jane Lynch
5	5	"Shrinking and Growing"	Don Roos	Lisa Kudrow, Don Roos & Dan Bucatinsky	August 16, 2011
While Fiona continues therapy with Justin and Bryn, she makes a horrible discovery about their sessions. Meanwhile, Fiona starts treating Robin, a new female client who has a connection to her husband. Regular cast first appearance: Julie Claire Guest cast: Patty Guggenheim, Drew Sherman and Maulik Pancholy
6	6	"We've Got a Secret"	Don Roos	Lisa Kudrow, Don Roos & Dan Bucatinsky	August 23, 2011
Fiona's marriage starts to slowly crumble when she discovers Kip's extracurricular activities. Fiona's mother's secret past threatens the Web Therapy business. Guest cast: Maulik Pancholy
7	7	"Exposed!"	Don Roos	Lisa Kudrow, Don Roos & Dan Bucatinsky	August 30, 2011
Fiona tries to get her house in order by hiring a new employee. Meanwhile, Kip and Fiona join together to expose an imposter in the family. Guest cast: Maulik Pancholy
8	8	"Psychic Analysis"	Don Roos	Lisa Kudrow, Don Roos & Dan Bucatinsky	September 6, 2011
Fiona's new client is an Internet psychic who has lost her abilities and wants the web therapist's help in retrieving them. Guest cast: Courteney Cox and Steven Weber
9	9	"Whistle While You Work"	Don Roos & Dan Bucatinsky	Lisa Kudrow, Don Roos & Dan Bucatinsky	September 13, 2011
Fiona's principal investor Robert Lachman goes out of business but Fiona still manages to make him pay up. Guest cast: Steven Weber and Patrick Curran
10	10	"Strange Bedfellows"	Don Roos & Dan Bucatinsky	Lisa Kudrow, Don Roos & Dan Bucatinsky	September 20, 2011
Fiona hits it off personally and professionally with a wealthy media mogul until her marriage to Kip suddenly becomes much more attractive. Regular cast first appearance: Alan Cumming
