= Web Therapy season 4 =

Web Therapy
- Season 4
- No. of episodes: 12

Release
- Original network: Showtime
- Original release: October 22, 2014 – January 28, 2015

Season chronology
- ← Previous; Season 3

The fourth and final season of the American improvisational comedy television series Web Therapy premiered on October 22, 2014, and concluded on January 28, 2015, on Showtime. The series stars Lisa Kudrow as Fiona Wallice, a therapist who has conceived of a new form of therapy: the titular "web therapy". This season contains the webisodes from seasons five and six of the web series.

== Plot ==
Following the events of season three, Web Therapy has been shut down by Putsy, while Gareth contacts Fiona and reveals that Putsy is treating him harshly and cheating on him with another man. When Fiona convinces him to take more control over his marriage, he gets Web Therapy back up and running, which results in Putsy ending their marriage and moving out of Fiona's New York penthouse.

Fiona contacts Jerome, who has been enjoying baby Angus' trust inheritance, revalued at nearly $40,000,000, with Gina and Hayley, who is away on a business trip to Bali. While expenses for the New York penthouse are piling up, Fiona tries to get Jerome to pay the bills but learns that he can only make baby-related purchases with the money. After Jerome and Angus spend a night in the penthouse in an unsuccessful attempt to cover the costs with the trust at Fiona's behest, Jerome moves to a new apartment in the Plaza Hotel with Angus and Gina. As Fiona struggles to find another way to pay off her penthouse bills, she is contacted by Austen's brother Ewan Clarke, who is the executor of Angus' trust and is conducting an investigation into Austen's former assets as well as his sanity and ability to make good financial decisions. Fiona is able to provide proof to clear Austen, destroying Ewan's case, but Ewan reveals that he has been given Putsy's Net Therapy, now worth $250,000,000. When Fiona learns that Ewan and his wife plan to start a medical business with their newfound fortune, she graciously allows them to use the penthouse as a vacation home, realizing that they may need it more than she does.

Kip and Fiona are at a better place in their relationship, although they have not consummated their remarriage as Kip has been appointed as a circuit judge thanks to Putsy's help and is working long hours as a result. While Putsy continues her plans to help Kip get appointed as a Supreme Court judge, Kip's assistant April contacts Fiona to tell her that she is falling in love with Kip and wants to marry him when he gets his seat on the Supreme Court. Fiona tells Kip of this and tries to deter them from the affair, revealing that Kip is gay; but Kip admits to April that he also has feelings for her, leaving Fiona dumbfounded.

With construction at Jerome and Hayley's next door house in Philadelphia being a constant nuisance to Fiona, she is horrified to learn that she is going to be surrounded as they have also purchased another home next to her, and that Hayley, having returned from Bali, wants to build horse stables for Angus. Hayley then confesses to Fiona that she cheated on Jerome while in Bali and is thus pregnant with another man's child. Fiona secretly records this confession and reveals the truth to an appalled Jerome, who cancels the construction project and ends their marriage. Gina is starting a business of sex toys (wanting to have Fiona as the spokesperson) and sexually harasses Jerome, leaving him to need Fiona's help, so they send her to a sex addiction rehab facility in Nevada.

Richard and Robin are living in Montana under the names Jacques and Betsy with their newborn son Tyrone. Richard has become a biker and opened a dance studio. Because of fracking in the area, the water has become polluted. Robin takes advantage of this by faking amnesia in order to get out of the witness protection program and leave Richard for Las Vegas, and then secretly contacts Fiona to leak the details of her plan. Angered by the manipulation, Fiona informs Richard of Robin's activities and books her a one-way flight to Vegas. When Richard wrongly suspects that Fiona has romantic feelings for him again; she reluctantly decides to get him out of the witness protection program too and take him back to Philadelphia in order to set him straight.

Fiona also does therapy with a rageful meditation teacher, a lottery winner, a head-mistress who needs Fiona's help with her impending marriage, a phone sex operator for older women, and Fiona's next-door neighbor. After discovering that the NSA has hacked her computer and watched her sessions, Fiona is able to get them to stop, but when every session is accidentally released, Fiona becomes one of the most hated women in America, which also jeopardizes Kip's chances of becoming a Supreme Court judge. As a result, April breaks up with Kip, revealing that she had only been using him for the attention of being romantically involved with a Supreme Court judge. Kip then decides to go on a spiritual retreat to Montana with Ben, who has recently been released from prison. Kip tries to affirm that neither him nor Ben are gay anymore and that he will not be divorcing Fiona, but she is left confused and unsure if he is telling the truth. Jerome is arrested for helping Putsy cut the brakes of a Supreme Court judge's car in an attempt to get Kip nominated, but asks Fiona to care for Angus in his absence. As Fiona struggles to bond with Angus, she pulls Gina out of rehab and hires her to be Angus' full-time nanny while Jerome co-operates with the authorities in exchange for a reduced sentence.

Jenny Bologna, a Boston-based fixer, is able to tone down the hatred towards Fiona, and reveals that Google is finally interested in purchasing Web Therapy. Jenny begins to reveal that she thinks that she and Fiona had been switched at birth; thus making Putsy Jenny's biological mother and not Fiona's. After getting DNA samples from herself, Fiona, and Putsy, Jenny does a DNA test, which confirms that Jenny is Putsy's daughter and Fiona is not Putsy's daughter. As Putsy and Jenny revel in their newfound familial bond, Fiona is also thrilled with the news herself and her joy is put over the top when Austen calls, saying that he is rich again after discovering oil and diamonds in Africa, and that he is coming back to Philadelphia to reunite with her.

== Cast ==
=== Regular cast ===
- Lisa Kudrow as Fiona Wallice (12 episodes)
- Dan Bucatinsky as Jerome Sokoloff (8 episodes)
- Lily Tomlin as Putsy Hodge (6 episodes, including one voice appearance)
- Jennifer Elise Cox as Gina Spinks (6 episodes, including one uncredited voice appearance)
- Victor Garber as Kip Wallice (3 episodes)
- Rashida Jones as Hayley Feldman-Tate (2 episodes)
- Tim Bagley as Richard Pratt/Jacques Camos (2 episodes)
- Julie Claire as Robin Griner/Betsy Camos (1 episode)
- Alan Cumming as Austen Clark (1 episode)

=== Guest cast ===
- Dax Shepard as Abel Jans/Mark (3 episodes)
- Billy Crystal as Garreth Pink (2 episodes)
- Gwyneth Paltrow as Maya Ganesh/Debbie Schnitman (2 episodes)
- Jesse Tyler Ferguson as Steve Olson/Joe Drake (2 episodes)
- Jon Hamm as Jeb Masters (2 episodes)
- Lauren Graham as Grace Tiverton (2 episodes)
- Craig Ferguson as Ewan Clarke (2 episodes)
- Allison Janney as Judith Frick (2 episodes)
- Nina Garcia as herself (2 episodes)
- Caspar Lee as himself (2 episodes)
- Calista Flockhart as April Keating (2 episodes)
- Matthew Perry as Tyler Bishop (2 episodes)
- Christina Applegate as Jenny Bologna (2 episodes)

The actors are not distinguished between regular and guest cast in the show. Regular cast here refers to the actors who appear throughout the series while guest cast appear only in one or a few episodes.

== Production ==
On January 14, 2014, Showtime renewed Web Therapy for a 10 episode fourth season. Guest stars for this season include, Gwyneth Paltrow as Maya Ganesh/Debbie Schnitman, a healing center operator that turns to Fiona for help on her rage issues; Jon Hamm as Jeb Masters, a phone sex employee for the elderly, who's having relationship trouble; Jesse Tyler Ferguson as Steve Olson, a lottery winner who asks Fiona for help with his trust issues; Lauren Graham as Grace Tiverton, an odd neighbour of Fiona's; Craig Ferguson as Ewan Clarke, Austen's brother and manager of Angus' trust; Allison Janney as Judith Frick, an all girls school headmistress, who seeks out Fiona for advice on her first sexual encounter; Calista Flockhart as April Keating, Kip's law clerk that is in love with him; Dax Shepard as Abel Jans/Mark, a NSA worker that has been watching Fiona's sessions; Matthew Perry as Tyler Bishop, a professional lawyer that contacts Fiona for help over his compulsive lying problem; and Nina Garcia as herself. Christina Applegate will also appear this season as Jenny Bologna, a Boston-based PR executive who helps Fiona recover from her NSA scandal, and idolizes Putsy. Meanwhile, Dan Bucatinsky, Billy Crystal, Lily Tomlin, Rashida Jones, Victor Garber, Julie Claire, Jennifer Elise Cox and Tim Bagley are all set to reprise their roles this season.

== Episodes ==
No. overall	No. in season	Title	Directed by	Written by	Original release date	US viewers (millions)
32	1	"Call in the Light"	Don Roos	Lisa Kudrow & Don Roos & Dan Bucatinsky	October 22, 2014	0.051
Guest cast: Billy Crystal and Gwyneth Paltrow
33	2	"Arguing in Agreement"	Don Roos	Lisa Kudrow, Don Roos & Dan Bucatinsky	October 29, 2014	0.127
Guest cast: Billy Crystal and Gwyneth Paltrow
34	3	"Trust Exercise"	Don Roos	Lisa Kudrow, Don Roos & Dan Bucatinsky	November 5, 2014	0.027
Guest cast: Jesse Tyler Ferguson and Jon Hamm
35	4	"Smile Through the Pain"	Don Roos	Lisa Kudrow, Don Roos & Dan Bucatinsky	November 12, 2014	0.034
Guest cast: Jesse Tyler Ferguson, Jon Hamm and Lauren Graham
36	5	"In Angus We Trust"	Don Roos	Lisa Kudrow, Don Roos & Dan Bucatinsky	November 19, 2014	0.025
Guest cast: Lauren Graham and Craig Ferguson
37	6	"Charity Galore"	Don Roos	Lisa Kudrow, Don Roos & Dan Bucatinsky	November 26, 2014	0.086
Guest cast: Craig Ferguson
38	7	"Drink to Forget"	Don Roos	Lisa Kudrow, Don Roos & Dan Bucatinsky	December 3, 2014	0.053
Guest cast: Allison Janney and Nina Garcia
39	8	"Lost on the Young"	Don Roos	Lisa Kudrow, Don Roos & Dan Bucatinsky	December 10, 2014	0.057
Guest cast: Allison Janney, Caspar Lee and Calista Flockhart
40	9	"Judicial Oversight"	Don Roos	Lisa Kudrow, Don Roos & Dan Bucatinsky	December 17, 2014	0.062
Guest cast: Nina Garcia, Caspar Lee, Calista Flockhart and Dax Shepard
41	10	"Lies and Alibis"	Don Roos	Lisa Kudrow, Don Roos & Dan Bucatinsky	January 14, 2015	0.071
A lawyer client wants Fiona to certify that he's not a compulsive liar. Guest cast: Dax Shepard and Matthew Perry
42	11	"No Stranger to Scandal"	Don Roos	Lisa Kudrow, Don Roos & Dan Bucatinsky	January 21, 2015	0.031
A fixer contacts Fiona to improve her image after the bribery scandal. Guest cast: Dax Shepard, Matthew Perry and Christina Applegate
43	12	"Fiona Fulfilled"	Don Roos	Lisa Kudrow, Don Roos & Dan Bucatinsky	January 28, 2015	0.023
Guest cast: Christina Applegate
