= Web Therapy season 2 =

Web Therapy
- Season 2
- No. of episodes: 11

Release
- Original network: Showtime
- Original release: July 2 – September 9, 2012

Season chronology
- ← Previous; Season 1 Next → Season 3

The second season of the American Improvisational comedy television series Web Therapy premiered on July 2, 2012, and concluded on September 9, 2012, on Showtime. The series stars Lisa Kudrow as Fiona Wallice, a therapist who has conceived of a new form of therapy: the titular "web therapy". This season contains the webisodes from seasons three and four of the web series.

== Plot ==
Kip and Fiona's marriage is clearly strained due to what happened at the end of the previous season, but the two must work together during the campaign, meaning that Austen and Fiona are unable to continue their romance and can only communicate via Skype. Additionally, the publication of Fiona's book is postponed until after the campaign, allowing Fiona to work with Austen's assistant editor Maxine DeMaine and Jerome in New York to make some changes to the book.

On Austen's suggestion, Kip attends the Compass Center, a sexual orientation camp. While his progress at the center is at a rocky start, Camilla Bowner, the owner and therapist at the center, helps to speed up his recovery with her sexual treatments, leaving Fiona concerned that this may be leading to divorce and increased press attention towards Camilla. After Maxine criticizes Fiona's apparent narcissism in the book and questions her likeability factor, Jerome sends Maxine some new chapters of Fiona's book that reveal some hidden moments of her life which Fiona deems too embarrassing or too boring for herself to reveal but Maxine approves of. Fiona is unimpressed with Jerome's now-wife Hayley's attempts to write some new material in Fiona's voice, as she is concerned that she might be perceived as weak in the book, so she goes back to New York to work on the book further; later confiding in Maxine her frustration with Austen's apparent lack of romantic attention towards her. Maxine slyly encourages Fiona to break off her romance and work on her marriage with Kip. Fiona then contacts Camilla's husband Trent and schedules a private session with him at her house in Philadelphia so Trent can prepare her for her reunion with Kip once he returns home from Compass. However, Austen changes his romantic behavior towards Fiona; as a result she stays in New York as Trent goes to Philadelphia. Kip arrives afterwards and the two end up having sex; Trent then goes missing. Fiona discovers footage of the sexual encounter that was caught on security cameras and tells Camilla, who begs her for the tapes. Fiona refuses, vowing to support her husband during his campaign, and advises Camilla to work on her own marriage to Trent. Maxine later reveals to Fiona how she knew that Austen truly loves her; using that to her own advantage to get herself fired and gain a substantial retirement package for herself. Soon, Trent returns to Camilla, and they send a donation to Kip and Fiona's home, including a pair of Trent's boxers.

The issue of Kip being gay resurfaces when Robin contacts Fiona, intending to make amends for her earlier behaviour and having gotten help for her depression. Fiona then reveals that during the course of her marriage so far, she has had doubts and suspicions about Kip having an affair, but has come to an understanding over the situation. Robin then reveals that she has taped the entire conversation, and implies she may release it publicly. Fiona hires Richard as part of the campaign team, and during a discussion with Kip's campaign manager Ben Tomlund, she recommends Robin as a documentarian to produce video material for the campaign. However, once the hiring transaction is confirmed, Ben reveals he cannot find any sign of Fiona's accreditation, and urges her to temporarily suspend her services until she receives the accreditation notice. So in a moment of desperation, Fiona asks her sister, psychotherapist Shevaun Haig, to help her get the accreditation. However, Shevaun says that Fiona has to undergo the 50-minute sessions in order for the accreditation to take effect. Fiona also learns from these sessions that Putsy, with whom Shevaun has moved in, has become even more mentally unstable. Fiona feels run-down during the sessions with Shevaun because she reminds her of everything that went wrong in her life, and starts to feel that her own sister is using her for her own benefit. When Shevaun signs the accreditation form, Fiona feels relieved, and as a result, her popularity as a web therapist starts to skyrocket as a result. However, though she agrees to letting Putsy stay with her temporarily, she takes control of Putsy's financial assets and evicts Shevaun from Putsy's house as payback. Fiona later discovers that Putsy is in danger of being charged for the murder of her roommate, which may have been the result of their shared interest in puppetry. Fiona succeeds in helping her mother avoid the murder charges with the police ruling the death as a suicide, but is later horrified when she discovers that Putsy is starting a "Net Therapy" business and using puppetry in her practice.

Fiona begins to gain interest from blogger Kirsten Noble, who interviews her for her blog "Neuroticornucorpia", and television actress Allegra Faverau, who found Fiona's book on a plane, and wants to film a movie adaptation of the book with herself starring as Fiona for Lifetime. However, Kirsten puts some weird sexual fantasies featuring a persona known as "Filona W." and some digitally altered photos of Fiona on her blog, which does not do good for the campaign, and makes Kip suspect that Fiona is a lesbian. After legal trouble, Kirsten censors these fantasies and puts a link on her blog to Web Therapy, and the LGBT community gives their support to Kip's campaign; but Austen deletes Kirsten's blog before she or Fiona can capitalize further on the attention. Fiona then accompanies Allegra to Los Angeles to prepare for her movie role, but Jerome asks Hayley to also accompany her on the trip. The trip does not go well, when Hayley is arrested at the airport due to mysterious scissors in her luggage, and Fiona encourages Allegra, a recovering alcoholic, to have a drink, and unknowingly and unwittingly causes her drinking to go out of control. Fiona learns that Lifetime are moving forward with the movie project without Allegra.

When Jerome and Hayley are trying to have a baby, they hire a woman named Tammy as a surrogate. Fiona learns that Tammy is demanding to Jerome and Hayley; risking jeopardizing Jerome's position in his job as a result. She soon realizes that Tammy is lying about the pregnancy and scamming both Jerome and Hayley, and informs Jerome about her deception; leaving him grateful to her for saving his marriage from a con artist.

When Gina struggles with unemployment, Fiona tries to help her find a good job, but doubting that she can work herself at such a low level as a receptionist, she informs Gina of a job opening in Yukon Canneries in Alaska as a shipping specialist. Some time later, Austen promotes Gina after she rescues him from a choking incident with CPR, and she prepares for her new job as a management trainee in London.

Fiona becomes angry when Ben schedules and then postpones her media appearances and indirectly accuses her of making Kip lose his youth and damaging his career. She starts to suspect a relationship between Kip and Ben beginning. Upset about this accusation, Ben almost quits the campaign. However, they resolve their differences and agree to work together for the campaign, and Ben assures Fiona that there is nothing going on between him and Kip.

Fiona does a series of video chat sessions with her college friend Newell Miller, whom she does not recognize at first. After he attempts to break into her home, he reminds Fiona that she slept with his father, a professor, at one point while they were in college, and Newell witnessed the sexual encounter. As a result, he has had a series of disastrous relationships because the women remind him of Fiona. He plans a romantic session with Fiona to cure himself of his obsession, but Fiona turns him down. She does set him up with some sessions with Shevaun, which helps to finally cure him. When quizzed on how she knows Shevaun, she tells Newell of their family history, and reveals that she went to the same college as Newell because Shevaun had gone there earlier and also slept with his father when her hair was blonde; this causes Newell to become obsessed with Shevaun.

In one of the final storylines of the season, Fiona discovers that Richard has feelings for co-worker Robin, and has started dating her. During another session, Robin reveals that she is dating Richard as a rebound after her relationship with Kip. Robin reveals that she possesses tapes which apparently show Kip and Ben engaging in sex, infuriating both Richard and Fiona. Fiona demands that Robin hand over the tapes, but she refuses despite the terms on her contract. She implies that Richard is only dating her to move on from Fiona despite the fact that he is still in love with her, which he denies. Fiona also sees how condescending Robin is to Richard, and how he is becoming more and more upset by her, and it reminds her of how her chances of a possible romance with Austen are being hindered by her husband's campaign. Unable to take it anymore, Fiona fires Robin and Richard breaks up with her; Robin then leaks the tapes and puts the entire campaign in jeopardy. Kip panics and then eventually resigns from his candidate post.

After the end of Kip's campaign, Hayley asks Fiona for her forgiveness for her behavior during their sessions and the airport incident, and announces with Jerome that they helped with the Lifetime movie project. Hayley had pitched the movie to be reworked into a musical named Whistlin', which was very popular with the network. Despite the fact that the format is now different from Fiona and Allegra's original plan, Jerome convinces her that the characters will be explored further using this format and she reluctantly agrees to let them work the project. To accommodate the new production schedule, Jerome decides to temporarily work for Putsy at Net Therapy, and has Hayley take his place as Fiona's assistant. Fiona initially objects to this new arrangement, but eventually concedes to Jerome and Hayley, who are surprised to finally see some good heart from the therapist. Kip tells Fiona that he is going to Santa Fe, New Mexico with Ben for a while, because they need some time apart and he ultimately needs to know what he wants to do next. Later, Fiona announces her separation to Austen and tells him that now they can be together. However, Gina then appears and reveals to a shocked Fiona that she is pregnant with Austen's baby.

== Cast ==
=== Regular cast ===
- Lisa Kudrow as Fiona Wallice (11 episodes)
- Dan Bucatinsky as Jerome Sokoloff (10 episodes)
- Victor Garber as Kip Wallice (6 episodes)
- Jennifer Elise Cox as Gina Spinks (5 episodes)
- Alan Cumming as Austen Clarke (4 episodes)
- Julie Claire as Robin Griner (3 episodes)
- Michael McDonald as Ben Tomlund (2 episodes)
- Lily Tomlin as Putsy Hodge (2 episodes)
- Tim Bagley as Richard Pratt (2 episodes)
- Rashida Jones as Hayley Feldman-Tate (1 episode)

=== Guest cast ===
- David Schwimmer as Newell Miller (4 episodes)
- Rosie O'Donnell as Maxine DeMaine (3 episodes)
- Meryl Streep as Camilla Bowner (2 episodes)
- Molly Shannon as Kirsten Noble (2 episodes)
- Minnie Driver as Allegra Favreau (2 episodes)
- Selma Blair as Tammy Hines (2 episodes)
- Conan O'Brien as Conan O'Brien (2 episodes)
- Julia Louis-Dreyfus as Shevaun Haig (1 episode)

The actors are not distinguished between regular and guest cast in the show. Regular cast here refers to the actors who appear throughout the series while guest cast appear only in one or a few episodes.

== Production ==
In December 2011, Showtime renewed Web Therapy for a second season of 11 episodes, which premiered on July 2, 2012. Guest stars for season two included Meryl Streep, Conan O'Brien, Rosie O'Donnell, Julia Louis-Dreyfus, Molly Shannon, Minnie Driver, and Selma Blair. David Schwimmer appeared in a four-episode arc as Newell Miller, a man who tracks down Fiona for help after a past experience which she was involved in affected his love life. Episodes ten and eleven of season two aired on Sunday at 10:30pm following Weeds, instead of the usual Monday at 11pm time slot.

As with the first season, this season contained both the original sessions from the web series and new scenes shot afterwards specifically to link the sessions together and introduce new storylines for the TV series. However, this season - whilst containing seasons three and four of the web series - significantly altered particularly the original ending that was created for the third web season; which was originally the final season filmed in 2010 before the TV series began production. The fourth web season was the first one written specifically to tie into the events of the first TV season; the episodes with O'Donnell referencing Kip's upcoming Congress campaign. In the original web season three ending, Robin's release of the footage of Kip and Ben having sex backfires with Robin being mocked by the media as a transvestite, Kip leaving Ben who has been left homeless, and Hayley almost leaving Jerome for costing Tammy as a surrogate until he angrily confronts Fiona for her behavior and demands a better payment plan; she and Kip are left no worse than before and prepare to continue Kip's campaign. Additionally, the webisodes with Streep briefly mention Kip's "scandal" that Fiona says needs to be "straightened out". However, with the production and airing of the second TV season, the Streep webisodes were edited to remove mentions of the "scandal" and placed alongside the O'Donnell webisodes in the first two episodes to take place at the same time; and the ending of the second TV season was overhauled to have more direct consequences for Fiona, particularly with Kip's campaign failing and him leaving Fiona for Ben, whilst Jerome and Hayley's marriage remains intact.

== Episodes ==
No. overall	No. in season	Title	Directed by	Written by	Original release date	US viewers (millions)
11	1	"Getting it Straight"	Don Roos	Lisa Kudrow, Don Roos & Dan Bucatinsky	July 2, 2012	0.103
Whilst Kip is at sexual reorientation camp, Fiona flies to New York to work on her book and meet with publisher Maxine DeMaine (Rosie O'Donnell). Whilst there Fiona talks to Kip's counselor Camilla Bowner (Meryl Streep), who decides Kip's recovery needs to take a drastic change. Guest cast: Rosie O'Donnell and Meryl Streep
12	2	"Blindsides and Backslides"	Don Roos	Lisa Kudrow, Don Roos & Dan Bucatinsky	July 9, 2012	N/A
When Fiona finds out what Camilla has really been doing with Kip's recovery, she decides she must act quickly to counter. Meanwhile, Fiona doesn't take it well when Maxine and Jerome re-write her book. Guest cast: Rosie O'Donnell and Meryl Streep
13	3	"Campaign Reform"	Don Roos	Lisa Kudrow, Don Roos & Dan Bucatinsky	July 16, 2012	N/A
With Maxine no-longer a threat for her book; Fiona once again faces Robin, who blackmails Fiona into getting her a job on Kip's campaign. Meanwhile, Kip's campaign manager, Ben (Michael McDonald) finds out that Fiona's Web Therapy business isn't accredited and tells Fiona that she now has to suspend treating her patients. Regular cast first appearance: Michael McDonald Guest cast: Rosie O'Donnell
14	4	"Sister Act"	Don Roos	Lisa Kudrow, Don Roos & Dan Bucatinsky	July 23, 2012	0.027
In an attempt to get Web Therapy accredited, Fiona tasks her sister Shevaun (Julia Louis-Dreyfus) with signing the accreditation form. However, Shevaun decides that before she can sign the form, Fiona should first undergo the recommended 50-minutes sessions. Fiona tries to help a now unemployed Gina (Jennifer Elise Cox) find a job. Guest cast: Julia Louis-Dreyfus
15	5	"National Exposure"	Don Roos & Dan Bucatinsky	Lisa Kudrow, Don Roos & Dan Bucatinsky	July 30, 2012	0.064
A reporter (Molly Shannon) starts interviewing Fiona, but instead puts an erotic story featuring Fiona on her blog; Newly sober television actress Allegra Favreau (Minnie Driver) wants to pitch Fiona's book for a Lifetime movie. Guest cast: Molly Shannon and Minnie Driver
16	6	"Adaptation"	Don Roos & Dan Bucatinsky	Lisa Kudrow, Don Roos & Dan Bucatinsky	August 6, 2012	0.025
Gina needs a job, and Fiona helps to get her one in Alaska; Allegra prepares to play Fiona but insists that she fly to L.A. first, however, when Jerome asks an unwelcome Hayley to join Fiona, the whole trip turns into a disaster. Guest cast: Molly Shannon and Minnie Driver
17	7	"Infanticipation"	Don Roos	Lisa Kudrow, Don Roos & Dan Bucatinsky	August 13, 2012	N/A
Jerome introduces his surrogate, Tammy (Selma Blair) to Fiona, where she learns that babies are expensive; Fiona finally sees the true extent of the relationship between Kip and Ben. Guest cast: Selma Blair
18	8	"Man-Cave Man"	Don Roos	Lisa Kudrow, Don Roos & Dan Bucatinsky	August 20, 2012	0.074
After doing a video chat with her former college classmate Newell Miller (David Schwimmer), Fiona receives a new client, Conan O'Brien, whom she's never heard of. Guest cast: David Schwimmer and Conan O'Brien
19	9	"The Insanity Offense"	Don Roos	Lisa Kudrow, Don Roos & Dan Bucatinsky	August 27, 2012	0.097
Fiona and Tammy discuss money but Tammy reveals a secret, Fiona blackmails Conan O'Brien, Fiona's mother (Lily Tomlin) calls for help, and Newell shows up at Fiona's house uninvited. Guest cast: Selma Blair, Conan O'Brien and David Schwimmer
20	10	"Stalk Therapy"	Don Roos	Lisa Kudrow, Don Roos & Dan Bucatinsky	September 2, 2012	0.196
Fiona's mother's crime is starting to worry her mother; Newell plans a romantic therapy session with Fiona to cure his illness. Meanwhile, Gina informs Fiona that Austen has promoted her, and Richard Pratt (Tim Bagley) starts dating Fiona's nemesis Robin. Guest cast: David Schwimmer
21	11	"Electile Dysfunction"	Don Roos	Lisa Kudrow, Don Roos & Dan Bucatinsky	September 9, 2012	0.120
Fiona cures Newell by setting him up with her sister, Shevaun, and Newell realizes that Shevaun is the one his obsession is coming from. Then, Fiona does a requested session with Robin and Richard, but things spiral out of control when Robin gets fired and the Campaign's fate is determined. Hayley (Rashida Jones) returns with Jerome, who are making a Whistling While I Worked broadway musical called Whistlin'. Kip then says he is going to Santa Fe, New Mexico with Ben, and Fiona is at long last able to be with Austen, however, Gina reveals that she's pregnant with Austen's baby. Guest cast: David Schwimmer
