= List of Web Therapy webisodes =

Web Therapy is a web series of Lstudio.com mainly based on improvisation. Lisa Kudrow appears as the self-absorbed therapist Fiona Wallice who offers three-minute therapy sessions via webcam over the internet. Each webisode stars Kudrow video chatting with one or more guest stars.

All episodes are written by Lisa Kudrow, Don Roos, and Dan Bucatinsky, and all episodes are directed by Don Roos.

== Series overview ==
Season	Episodes	Originally released		
Season	Episodes	First released	Last released	Network
1	15	September 22, 2008		Lstudio
2	15	June 23, 2009		Lstudio
3	18	April 19, 2010	November 15, 2010	Lstudio
4	17	November 16, 2011	March 7, 2012	Lstudio
5	35	May 27, 2013		Hulu
6	33	September 18, 2014	December 4, 2014	StyleHaul

== Episode list ==
=== Season 1 (2008) ===
Season 1 consists of five stories, each divided in three parts, thus making 15 webisodes. Tim Bagley, Rashida Jones, Bob Balaban, Jane Lynch, Drew Sherman, Patty Guggenheim and Dan Bucatinsky star as Fiona Wallice's clients this season.

No.	Title	Guest star	Title card	Original release date
1	"An Old Flame (Part 1)"	Tim Bagley	How did you hear about this?	September 22, 2008
2	"An Old Flame (Part 2)"	Tim Bagley	You have a very sexy dress on and I'm a little drunk.	September 22, 2008
3	"An Old Flame (Part 3)"	Tim Bagley	What do you think, fatty?	September 22, 2008
4	"Sibling Ribaldry (Part 1)"	Dan Bucatinsky	What makes you think I don't specialize in incest?	September 22, 2008
5	"Sibling Ribaldry (Part 2)"	Dan Bucatinsky & Rashida Jones	There's been no romance since the unfortunate discovery.	September 22, 2008
6	"Sibling Ribaldry (Part 3)"	Dan Bucatinsky & Rashida Jones	You swabbed me in the night?	September 22, 2008
7	"The Breakthrough (Part 1)"	Bob Balaban	I'm not an easy patient.	September 22, 2008
8	"The Breakthrough (Part 2)"	Bob Balaban	What Fiona Needed	September 22, 2008
9	"The Breakthrough (Part 3)"	Bob Balaban	Was that real or was he talking about a "Jeffersons" episode?	September 22, 2008
10	"Psycho Analysis (Part 1)"	Jane Lynch	So you just say words and hope at the end of the sentence they make sense?	September 22, 2008
11	"Psycho Analysis (Part 2)"	Jane Lynch	Dangnabbit!	September 22, 2008
12	"Psycho Analysis (Part 3)"	Jane Lynch	Matt Lauer is a good friend of mine.	September 22, 2008
13	"Exposing the Truth (Part 1)"	Drew Sherman & Patti Guggenheim	We're like a well-oiled machine.	September 22, 2008
14	"Exposing the Truth (Part 2)"	Drew Sherman & Patti Guggenheim	You don't appear to be wearing any of the underwear.	September 22, 2008
15	"Exposing the Truth (Part 3)"	Drew Sherman & Patti Guggenheim	This feels very illegal to me.	September 22, 2008

=== Season 2 (2009) ===
Season 2 consists of five stories each divided in three parts thus making 15 webisodes similarly to the first season. Julie Claire, Courteney Cox, Steven Weber, Alan Cumming and Dan Bucatinsky star as Fiona Wallice's clients this season. Bucatinsky reprises his role as Jerome Sokoloff while Victor Garber guest stars as Fiona's husband, Kip.

No.	Title	Guest star	Title card	Original release date
16	"Gossip Girl (Part 1)"	Julie Claire	Spinning	June 23, 2009
17	"Gossip Girl (Part 2)"	Julie Claire	Meet Atlanta.	June 23, 2009
18	"Gossip Girl (Part 3)"	Julie Claire	You're a sick girl.	June 23, 2009
19	"Office Politics (Part 1)"	Dan Bucatinsky	Pound on your chest and yell.	June 23, 2009
20	"Office Politics (Part 2)"	Dan Bucatinsky	You wanna piece of this?	June 23, 2009
21	"Office Politics (Part 3)"	Dan Bucatinsky	New Positions	June 23, 2009
22	"Psychic Friends (Part 1)"	Courteney Cox	Phony Wall of Ice	June 23, 2009
23	"Psychic Friends (Part 2)"	Courteney Cox	Who's the fat girl on the pony?	June 23, 2009
24	"Psychic Friends (Part 3)"	Courteney Cox	What happened on Tyra yesterday?	June 23, 2009
25	"Kiss and Tell (Part 1)"	Steven Weber	The Better Looking Lachman Brother	June 23, 2009
26	"Kiss and Tell (Part 2)"	Steven Weber	Package Received	June 23, 2009
27	"Kiss and Tell (Part 3)"	Steven Weber	The Whistle Blower is an extremely heroic figure.	June 23, 2009
28	"Flying High (Part 1)"	Alan Cumming	You're pressing some nice buttons.	June 23, 2009
29	"Flying High (Part 2)"	Alan Cumming	Whatever you do, don't read page three.	June 23, 2009
30	"Flying High (Part 3)"	Alan Cumming, Dan Bucatinsky, & Victor Garber	Austen Clarke's Kingdom	June 23, 2009

=== Season 3 (2010) ===
Season 3 consists of 15 webisodes. This season mostly revolves around Fiona's husband's political campaign Julia Louis-Dreyfus, Molly Shannon, Selma Blair, Michael McDonald, Tim Bagley, Julie Claire and Dan Bucatinsky all guest star this season, with Bagley, Claire, and Bucatinsky reprising their roles as Richard Pratt, Robin Griner and Jerome Sokoloff, respectively.

After the third season had been completed, three special webisodes starring Meryl Streep as Camilla Bowner were added, making a total of 18 webisodes.

No.	Title	Guest star	Title card	Original release date
31	"Forget Me Not"	Julie Claire	A Teachable Moment	April 19, 2010
32	"Staff Infection"	Michael McDonald	This is the end of the discussion of Robin Griner.	April 19, 2010
33	"Why There Is No “Sister's Day”"	Julia Louis-Dreyfus	I need a psychoanalyst but you'll do.	April 19, 2010
34	"Mommy Track"	Selma Blair & Dan Bucatinsky	I've done it before but not for people this poor.	April 19, 2010
35	"Fiona's Turn"	Julia Louis-Dreyfus	Rendition	April 19, 2010
36	"Mom Always Loved Me Best"	Julia Louis-Dreyfus	Revengeful is a word.	April 19, 2010
37	"Bringing Up Babies"	Selma Blair & Dan Bucatinsky	If you can believe in fairytales, why can't I?	April 19, 2010
38	"Meet The Press"	Molly Shannon	I'm not from InStyle.	April 19, 2010
39	"Maternity Leave"	Selma Blair & Dan Bucatinsky	My babies don't have a private jet.	April 19, 2010
40	"Dream Girl"	Molly Shannon	You pixelated the suit so it looked like I was naked.	April 19, 2010
41	"Mistress of the Web"	Molly Shannon	Austen said he would and I guess he did.	April 19, 2010
42	"That Old Pratt Magic"	Tim Bagley & Julie Claire	Carrie Underwood	April 19, 2010
43	"I Love You, Man"	Michael McDonald	Highlights/Kip said I should tell you first.	April 19, 2010
44	"Breaking Up is Hard to Do"	Tim Bagley & Julie Claire	Everybody takes a bath.	April 19, 2010
45	"Can You Get Up?"	Dan Bucatinsky & Michael McDonald	N/A	April 19, 2010
46	"Aversion Therapy"	Meryl Streep	Have you ever cried like a little girl?	November 8, 2010
47	"Healing Touch"	Meryl Streep	Top to toe, back and front, all around the world.	November 11, 2010
48	"Reverse Psychology"	Meryl Streep	Kip was there to receive Trent.	November 15, 2010

=== Season 4 (2011–2012) ===
Season 4 consists of 17 webisodes. Rosie O'Donnell, Conan O'Brien, Natasha Bedingfield, Minnie Driver, Lily Tomlin and Dan Bucatinsky guest star this season.

No.	Title	Guest star	Title card	Original release date
49	"Morals to the Max"	Rosie O'Donnell	There is no real moral center in this woman.	November 16, 2011
50	"I Heart New York"	Dan Bucatinsky & Rosie O'Donnell	Friending	November 23, 2011
51	"Tokens of Affection"	Rosie O'Donnell	Is Austen no longer besotted?	November 30, 2011
52	"Publishers Cleaning House"	Rosie O'Donnell	All the genuflecting builds up the thigh muscles.	December 7, 2011
53	"The Host Whisperer"	Conan O'Brien & Dan Bucatinsky	Coco is a nickname Tom Hanks gave me.	December 14, 2011
54	"Quid Pro Conan"	Conan O'Brien	He's the dessert.	December 14, 2011
55	"Guess Who's Coming to Late Night?"	Conan O'Brien & Dan Bucatinsky	This is the closest I'll ever get to a sex tape.	December 14, 2011
56	"The Royal Treatment"	Natasha Bedingfield	Proxy Therapy	January 4, 2012
57	"Speed Bump"	Natasha Bedingfield	Why do you keep calling it a dynasty?	January 11, 2012
58	"Heir Today Gone Tomorrow"	Natasha Bedingfield	I'm insinuating what you insinuated.	January 18, 2012
59	"Hooray for Hollywood"	Minnie Driver	Please can I be you?	January 25, 2012
60	"That's How I Role"	Minnie Driver	I'm so ready to dig into your life.	February 1, 2012
61	"Come Fly With Me"	Dan Bucatinsky	I'm sure she must have been starving for a fan.	February 8, 2012
62	"Acting Out"	Minnie Driver	Maybe it wasn't the best visit to LA.	February 15, 2012
63	"Hands-On Therapy"	Lily Tomlin	I didn't take many years away from her.	February 22, 2012
64	"Cell Phone"	Lily Tomlin & Dan Bucatinsky	Marlon Brando	February 29, 2012
65	"The Family Business"	Lily Tomlin & Dan Bucatinsky	Loretta Young	March 7, 2012

=== Season 5 (2013) ===
Season 5 consists of 35 webisodes.

No.	Title	Guest star	Title card	Original release date
66	"Broadway Babies"	Megan Mullally	Have they ever done a musical about Charles Manson?	May 27, 2013
67	"Encore, Encore!"	Megan Mullally	Smarts and Beauty: Reprise	May 27, 2013
68	"Eff Broadway"	Megan Mullally	Fuck Broadway.	May 27, 2013
69	"Inspired By/Stolen From"	Dan Bucatinsky	N/A	May 27, 2013
70	"Now You're Talking About My Mother"	Dan Bucatinsky	Now you're talking about my mother.	May 27, 2013
71	"Rubber Sheets"	Dan Bucatinsky	Why are there rubber sheets on my bed?	May 27, 2013
72	"Dixie. Pixie. Smiley Face."	Tim Bagley	Dixie. Pixie. Smiley Face.	May 27, 2013
73	"It Might Have Been Ben Tomlund"	Julie Claire	It Might Have Been Ben Tomlund	May 27, 2013
74	"Once a Blackmailer..."	Julie Claire	Hack	May 27, 2013
75	"One Big Russian Family"	Tim Bagley	Death threats are fun.	May 27, 2013
76	"Just Say This Word"	Tim Bagley	After A Little Chat With The FBI	May 27, 2013
77	"Witless Protection"	Tim Bagley & Julie Claire	Thank you for fucking us.	May 27, 2013
78	"We're in Good with the NRA"	Victor Garber & Michael McDonald	We're in Good with the NRA.	May 27, 2013
79	"You Picked a Winner."	Victor Garber & Michael McDonald	You picked a winner.	May 27, 2013
80	"Game, Set Up, Match"	Victor Garber & Michael McDonald	Why Burning Is Better Than Shredding	May 27, 2013
81	"Rejuvenation"	Alan Cumming & Jennifer Elise Cox	I've met a vagina that needs rejuvenating.	May 27, 2013
82	"Get It Outta Me!!"	Jennifer Elise Cox	There's your belly button.	May 27, 2013
83	"Paternity Rites"	Dan Bucatinsky & Jennifer Elise Cox	Can you double dip it?	May 27, 2013
84	"The Archivist"	Meg Ryan	This Is Karen4Kip	May 27, 2013
85	"You Know How I Love Puzzles"	Meg Ryan	Cinnamon Lips and Honey Buns	May 27, 2013
86	"Extreme Makeover: Hoarder Edition"	Meg Ryan	Barbie & Midge	May 27, 2013
87	"Lucky Charm"	Matt LeBlanc	Flush and Fold	May 27, 2013
88	"Used Cards"	Matt LeBlanc	F In Philly	May 27, 2013
89	"Deuces Ex Machina"	Matt LeBlanc	You're fired.	May 27, 2013
90	"Power Balls"	Jesse Tyler Ferguson	I'm in the tank with the piranhas.	May 27, 2013
91	"Divestment Opportunities"	Jesse Tyler Ferguson	And there'll be baked goods?	May 27, 2013
92	"Swindle in the City"	Jesse Tyler Ferguson	I'd pay you money to let me do this again.	May 27, 2013
93	"Long-Distance Lovers"	Mae Whitman & Darren Criss	It was either you or the discount skydiving.	May 27, 2013
94	"Losing Followers"	Mae Whitman & Darren Criss	That's not what your Find My iPhone app said.	May 27, 2013
95	"Closer When We're Apart"	Mae Whitman & Darren Criss	We're imperfect and disgusting animals.	May 27, 2013
96	"Penetratress"	Chelsea Handler	Wouldn't it be great to be her?	May 27, 2013
97	"Hatching a Plan"	Chelsea Handler	Girlfriend Favor	May 27, 2013
98	"Spritzer Surprise"	Chelsea Handler	I was just this sucker who was plied with drink.	May 27, 2013
99	"Integrate Now"	Sara Gilbert	Were there voices telling you to do this?	May 27, 2013
100	"You've Come a Long Way Baby"	Sara Gilbert	Finally I'm playing the game of life.	May 27, 2013

=== Season 6 (2014) ===
Season 6 consists of 33 webisodes.

No.	Title	Guest star	Title card	Original release date
101	"From Before to After"	Nina Garcia	Project Fiona	September 18, 2014
102	"Replacement Gifts"	Caspar Lee	Nina Garcia can do whatever she wants.	September 18, 2014
103	"Ladrona! Ladrona! Fiona!"	Nina Garcia	Nina Garcia's Charity Case	September 18, 2014
104	"Internetainment"	Caspar Lee	123 Million Views	September 18, 2014
105	"Call Me Dad"	Billy Crystal	Call Me Dad.	September 25, 2014
106	"Marriage Sack"	Billy Crystal	I told Putsy and she went berserk.	September 25, 2014
107	"He Liked You Too Much"	Lily Tomlin	He liked you too much.	September 25, 2014
108	"Betsy Boss"	Lily Tomlin	In the palm of my hand.	September 25, 2014
109	"We've Been Played"	Rashida Jones	It sounded like you cheated on him a lot.	October 9, 2014
110	"Baby Bumps"	Rashida Jones & Dan Bucatinsky	How To Stop A Construction Project	October 9, 2014
111	"Pump the Brakes"	Lily Tomlin	Mission Impossible	October 16, 2014
112	"Burdensome Gifts"	Dan Bucatinsky	How To Pay For A Penthouse	October 23, 2014
113	"Potty Training"	Dan Bucatinsky	Pooping is never okay.	October 23, 2014
114	"Penthouse Problems"	Dan Bucatinsky	Nice Try	October 23, 2014
115	"Welcome Wagoner"	Lauren Graham	Grace	October 30, 2014
116	"Neighbor/Nuisance"	Lauren Graham	Spring Break, y'all!	October 30, 2014
117	"Cunning Chameleon"	Lauren Graham	Whose clothes are you wearing now?	October 30, 2014
118	"Together But Apart"	Victor Garber	At a certain point, sex is off-putting.	November 6, 2014
119	"Attachment Issues"	Calista Flockhart	I said "like" but I meant "love".	November 6, 2014
120	"Out in the Open"	Victor Garber & Calista Flockhart	I think penises are overrated.	November 6, 2014
121	"All About April"	Calista Flockhart	Such a sweet girl saying such unkind things.	November 6, 2014
122	"Absolute Last Call"	Jon Hamm	Absolute Last Call	November 13, 2014
123	"Dropping Candy Bars"	Jon Hamm	I can't do what I do and be attracted to you.	November 13, 2014
124	"Jeb Therapy"	Jon Hamm	At a certain point the blindfold comes off.	November 13, 2014
125	"Executor"	Craig Ferguson	Have you heard from Austen?	November 20, 2014
126	"Sell Out"	Craig Ferguson	A little talk about sex.	November 20, 2014
127	"Net Therapy Redux"	Craig Ferguson	Hakuna Matata	November 20, 2014
128	"Looking at Other Things"	Allison Janney	A leader, not a breeder.	November 27, 2014
129	"Learning Experience"	Allison Janney	And then you get to shower.	November 27, 2014
130	"Coital Consequences"	Allison Janney	Coming Clean	November 27, 2014
131	"State Secrets"	Dax Shepard	I love your program.	December 4, 2014
132	"Terror Threat"	Dax Shepard	They're already damaged when they come to me.	December 4, 2014
133	"Surprising Results"	Dax Shepard	I've never had someone who admired me before.	December 4, 2014
