= List of Web Therapy episodes =

The following is an episode list for the television series Web Therapy. The series stars Lisa Kudrow as Fiona Wallice, a therapist who has conceived of a new form of therapy: the titular "web therapy."

== Series overview ==
Season	Episodes	Originally released	
Season	Episodes	First released	Last released
1	10	July 19, 2011	September 20, 2011
2	11	July 2, 2012	September 9, 2012
3	10	July 23, 2013	September 24, 2013
4	12	October 22, 2014	January 28, 2015

== Episodes ==
=== Season 1 (2011) ===
No. overall	No. in season	Title	Directed by	Written by	Original release date
1	1	"Click to Start"	Don Roos	Lisa Kudrow, Don Roos & Dan Bucatinsky	July 19, 2011
2	2	"Desperate Measures"	Don Roos	Lisa Kudrow, Don Roos & Dan Bucatinsky	July 26, 2011
3	3	"Shrink Rap"	Don Roos	Lisa Kudrow, Don Roos & Dan Bucatinsky	August 2, 2011
4	4	"Public Relations"	Don Roos	Lisa Kudrow, Don Roos & Dan Bucatinsky	August 9, 2011
5	5	"Shrinking and Growing"	Don Roos	Lisa Kudrow, Don Roos & Dan Bucatinsky	August 16, 2011
6	6	"We've Got a Secret"	Don Roos	Lisa Kudrow, Don Roos & Dan Bucatinsky	August 23, 2011
7	7	"Exposed!"	Don Roos	Lisa Kudrow, Don Roos & Dan Bucatinsky	August 30, 2011
8	8	"Psychic Analysis"	Don Roos	Lisa Kudrow, Don Roos & Dan Bucatinsky	September 6, 2011
9	9	"Whistle While You Work"	Don Roos & Dan Bucatinsky	Lisa Kudrow, Don Roos & Dan Bucatinsky	September 13, 2011
10	10	"Strange Bedfellows"	Don Roos & Dan Bucatinsky	Lisa Kudrow, Don Roos & Dan Bucatinsky	September 20, 2011

=== Season 2 (2012) ===
No. overall	No. in season	Title	Directed by	Written by	Original release date	US viewers (millions)
11	1	"Getting it Straight"	Don Roos	Lisa Kudrow, Don Roos & Dan Bucatinsky	July 2, 2012	0.103
12	2	"Blindsides and Backslides"	Don Roos	Lisa Kudrow, Don Roos & Dan Bucatinsky	July 9, 2012	N/A
13	3	"Campaign Reform"	Don Roos	Lisa Kudrow, Don Roos & Dan Bucatinsky	July 16, 2012	N/A
14	4	"Sister Act"	Don Roos	Lisa Kudrow, Don Roos & Dan Bucatinsky	July 23, 2012	0.027
15	5	"National Exposure"	Don Roos & Dan Bucatinsky	Lisa Kudrow, Don Roos & Dan Bucatinsky	July 30, 2012	0.064
16	6	"Adaptation"	Don Roos & Dan Bucatinsky	Lisa Kudrow, Don Roos & Dan Bucatinsky	August 6, 2012	0.025
17	7	"Infanticipation"	Don Roos	Lisa Kudrow, Don Roos & Dan Bucatinsky	August 13, 2012	N/A
18	8	"Man-Cave Man"	Don Roos	Lisa Kudrow, Don Roos & Dan Bucatinsky	August 20, 2012	0.074
19	9	"The Insanity Offense"	Don Roos	Lisa Kudrow, Don Roos & Dan Bucatinsky	August 27, 2012	0.097
20	10	"Stalk Therapy"	Don Roos	Lisa Kudrow, Don Roos & Dan Bucatinsky	September 2, 2012	0.196
21	11	"Electile Dysfunction"	Don Roos	Lisa Kudrow, Don Roos & Dan Bucatinsky	September 9, 2012	0.120

=== Season 3 (2013) ===
No. overall	No. in season	Title	Directed by	Written by	Original release date
22	1	"Relax, Reboot, Revenge"	Don Roos	Lisa Kudrow, Don Roos & Dan Bucatinsky	July 23, 2013
23	2	"Who Doesn't Love Musicals"	Don Roos	Lisa Kudrow, Don Roos & Dan Bucatinsky	July 30, 2013
24	3	"Believe it or Not"	Don Roos	Lisa Kudrow, Don Roos & Dan Bucatinsky	August 6, 2013
25	4	"Case Files"	Don Roos	Lisa Kudrow, Don Roos & Dan Bucatinsky	August 13, 2013
26	5	"Stage Struck"	Don Roos	Lisa Kudrow, Don Roos & Dan Bucatinsky	August 20, 2013
27	6	"Love Stories"	Don Roos	Lisa Kudrow, Don Roos & Dan Bucatinsky	August 27, 2013
28	7	"Games People Play"	Don Roos	Lisa Kudrow, Don Roos & Dan Bucatinsky	September 3, 2013
29	8	"Husband Hunting"	Don Roos	Lisa Kudrow, Don Roos & Dan Bucatinsky	September 10, 2013
30	9	"Affairs to Remember"	Don Roos	Lisa Kudrow, Don Roos & Dan Bucatinsky	September 17, 2013
31	10	"No Place Like Home"	Don Roos	Lisa Kudrow, Don Roos & Dan Bucatinsky	September 24, 2013

=== Season 4 (2014–15) ===
No. overall	No. in season	Title	Directed by	Written by	Original release date	US viewers (millions)
32	1	"Call in the Light"	Don Roos	Lisa Kudrow & Don Roos & Dan Bucatinsky	October 22, 2014	0.051
33	2	"Arguing in Agreement"	Don Roos	Lisa Kudrow, Don Roos & Dan Bucatinsky	October 29, 2014	0.127
34	3	"Trust Exercise"	Don Roos	Lisa Kudrow, Don Roos & Dan Bucatinsky	November 5, 2014	0.027
35	4	"Smile Through the Pain"	Don Roos	Lisa Kudrow, Don Roos & Dan Bucatinsky	November 12, 2014	0.034
36	5	"In Angus We Trust"	Don Roos	Lisa Kudrow, Don Roos & Dan Bucatinsky	November 19, 2014	0.025
37	6	"Charity Galore"	Don Roos	Lisa Kudrow, Don Roos & Dan Bucatinsky	November 26, 2014	0.086
38	7	"Drink to Forget"	Don Roos	Lisa Kudrow, Don Roos & Dan Bucatinsky	December 3, 2014	0.053
39	8	"Lost on the Young"	Don Roos	Lisa Kudrow, Don Roos & Dan Bucatinsky	December 10, 2014	0.057
40	9	"Judicial Oversight"	Don Roos	Lisa Kudrow, Don Roos & Dan Bucatinsky	December 17, 2014	0.062
41	10	"Lies and Alibis"	Don Roos	Lisa Kudrow, Don Roos & Dan Bucatinsky	January 14, 2015	0.071
42	11	"No Stranger to Scandal"	Don Roos	Lisa Kudrow, Don Roos & Dan Bucatinsky	January 21, 2015	0.031
43	12	"Fiona Fulfilled"	Don Roos	Lisa Kudrow, Don Roos & Dan Bucatinsky	January 28, 2015	0.023
