= The Highest Stakes =

- Release poster
- Directed by: Tony Dean Smith
- Written by: Gary Preisler
- Produced by: Steven Paul
- Starring: Seth Green; Kevin Dillon; Charlie Weber; Dylan Walsh; Eloise Lovell Anderson; Chloe Fox; Dan Bucatinsky
- Cinematography: Ivan Vatsov
- Edited by: Shaun Lang
- Music by: Laurent Eyquem
- Production company: SP Media Group
- Distributed by: Paramount Global Content Distribution (through Republic Pictures)
- Release dates: April 13, 2026 (Beverly Hills); April 14, 2026 (United States)
- Running time: 105 minutes
- Country: United States
- Language: English

The Highest Stakes is a 2026 American thriller film directed by Tony Dean Smith and written by Gary Preisler, based on a story by Steven Paul, who also produced the film. The film follows five people who are invited to a high-stakes poker game when they learn the game is about survival rather than winning.

The film premiered at the Beverly Hills Film Festival on April 13, 2026, before releasing digitally the following day by Republic Pictures.

== Plot ==
At night, a masked intruder breaks into a home and murders a woman, Anna, in front of her seven-year-old daughter, Celeste. Afterwards, an older woman assures Celeste that the killer will be punished.

Years later, five strangers—salesman Billy Gray, detective Michael Quinn, Dr. Scott Stevens, congressman Tom Cartright, and escort Aurora Devereux—are invited to a high-stakes poker tournament at the luxury hotel Les Deux Sirenes for a $20 million prize. They meet their host, small-time actor Samuel Nicholas, before retiring to their rooms.

The first round is broadcast online through the promoter's website, with Aurora narrowly surviving elimination. Afterwards, Tom encounters his estranged now-adult stepdaughter Celeste, who is getting married at the hotel, and apologizes for sending her away after Anna's death, claiming he was unable to care for her. Elsewhere, Michael follows whispering voices into a staff area and discovers a masked gathering surrounding a couple having sex. When the twin concierges arrive, the room inexplicably becomes a kitchen, and they suggest a recent gas leak is causing hallucinations. Scott later dreams of encountering Celeste and then suddenly bleeding from a wound in his side.

After the second round, Billy encounters Celeste, who recognizes him as the con artist who once defrauded her. He attempts to abandon the tournament, but entering a taxi inexplicably returns him to his hotel room. Unable to find any evidence online of Samuel or that the tournament exists, Billy confides in Michael. Michael attempts to leave and finds the surrounding streets deserted and a poster commanding him to "repent" before he too is returned to the hotel.

The players confront Samuel, who admits his own concerns about the tournament. They attempt to escape together but are struck by a truck and immediately transported back to the game room. Suspecting they are being punished, Samuel encourages them to confess their worst acts. Michael admits to killing a criminal to steal drugs and money; Scott harvested patients' kidneys to pay gambling debts; Billy defrauded victims of their life savings, driving some to suicide; and Aurora accidentally strangled a man to death. Tom finally admits to murdering Anna and framing an innocent man, who was executed, so he could inherit her fortune and finance his political ambitions.

Samuel's assistant Dante tells the players that the tournament's winner can earn redemption. Michael responds by murdering the other contestants to win by default, only for Samuel to shoot him dead and then resurrect everyone. Samuel reveals that all five are destined for Hell and that his unnamed sponsor created the tournament to offer one participant a chance at salvation.

He then reveals that the contestants are connected through Celeste. Tom murdered her mother and abandoned her to the foster system, where she endured years of abuse. At sixteen, Scott secretly removed one of her kidneys during an appendicitis operation, leaving her in chronic pain that contributed to drug addiction. Michael later repeatedly raped her after fabricating charges and threatening imprisonment; when she resisted him, he had her imprisoned for three years. Billy subsequently conned her out of the inheritance left by her mother. Weeks later, Celeste died from an accidental overdose.

Samuel deals one final winner-takes-all hand. Each contestant reveals a strong hand, but Aurora wins and is revealed to actually be Celeste. Aurora was the form of Celeste's childhood imaginary friend, who comforted her on the night Anna was murdered. The others sincerely apologize for what they did to her, and Celeste forgives them, but Samuel nevertheless casts their souls into Hell.

Afterwards, Celeste thanks Samuel, revealing that the game was God's plan to offer her justice and redemption. Samuel, Dante, and the twin concierges cheerfully see her off before preparing for the next game.

== Cast ==
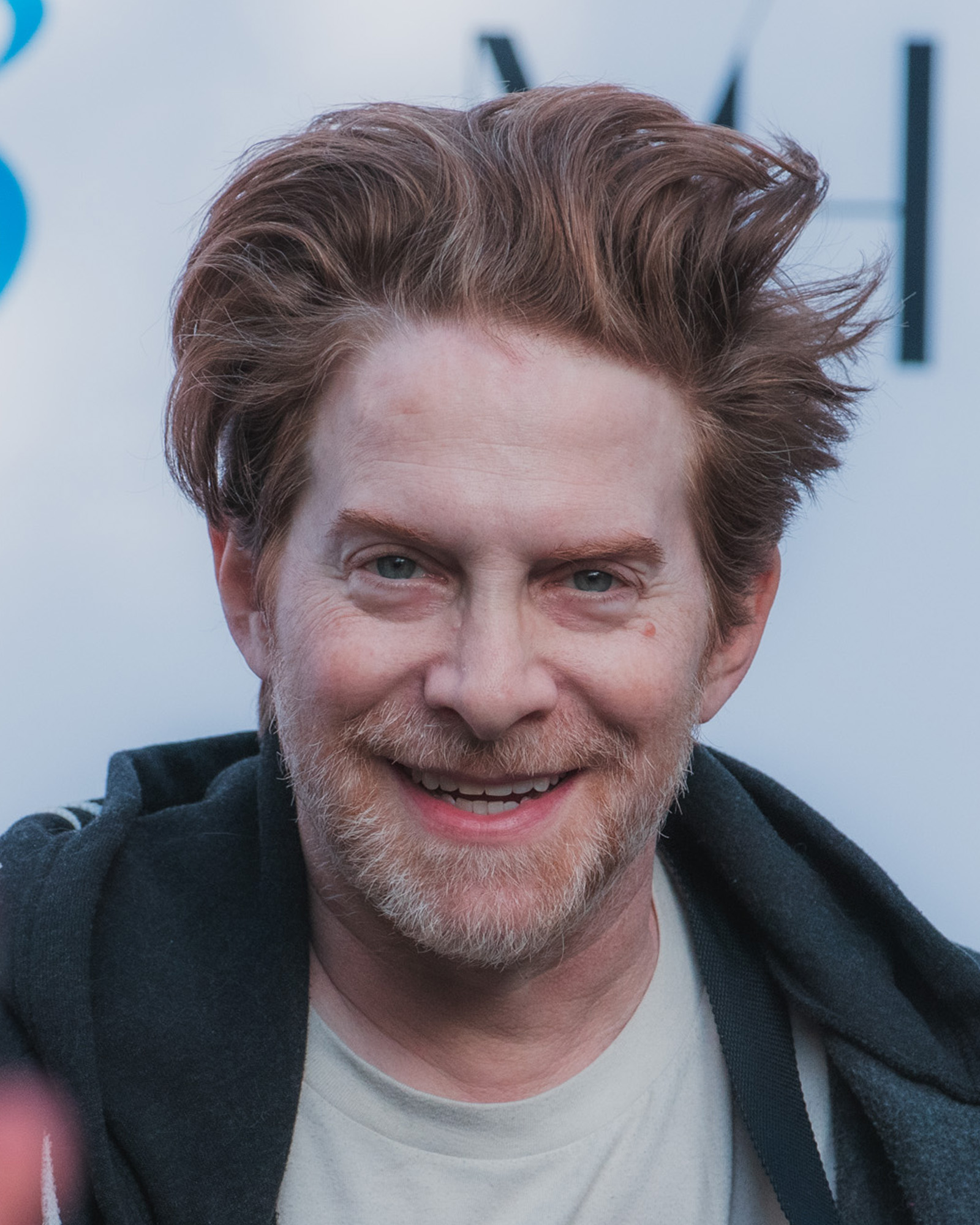
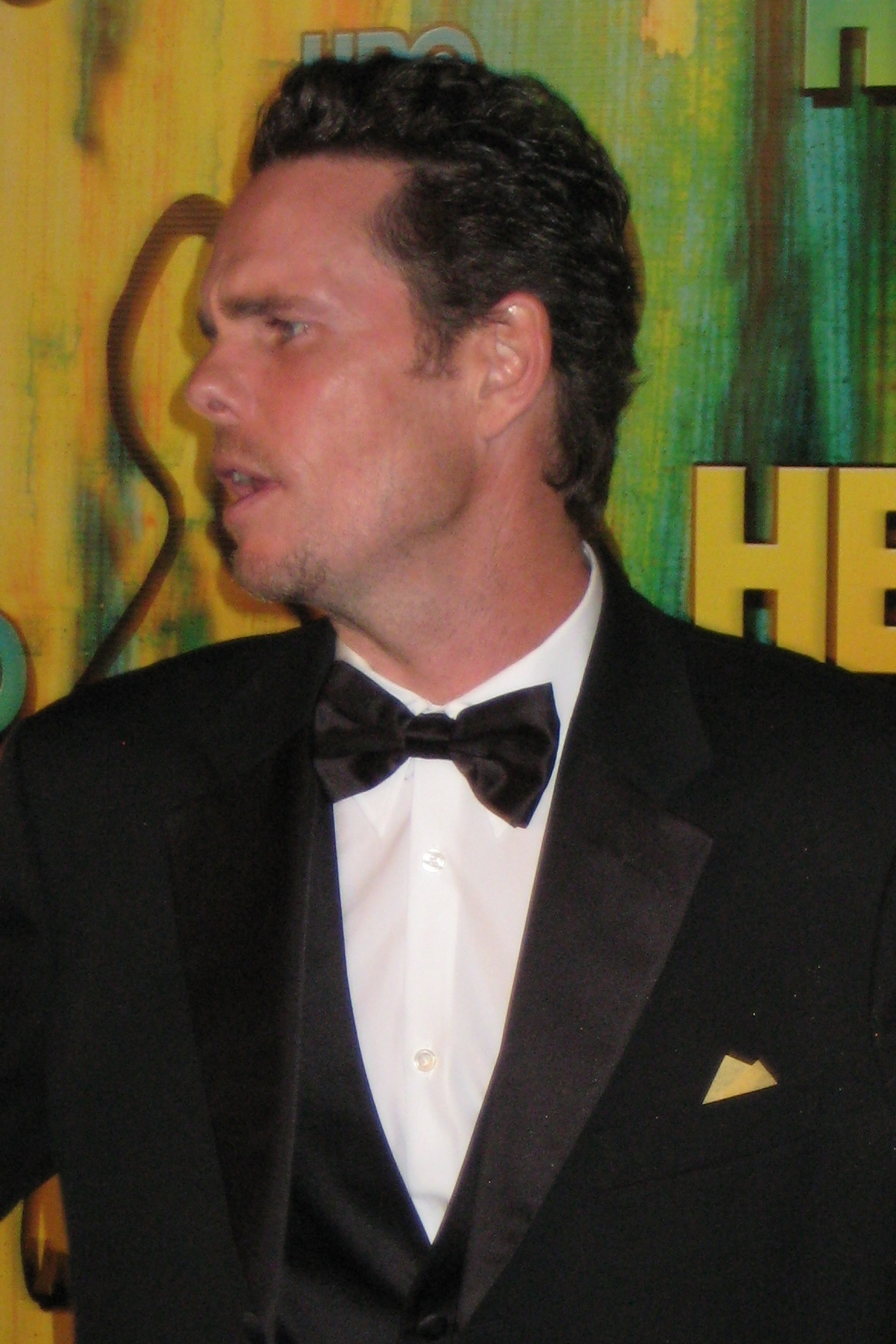
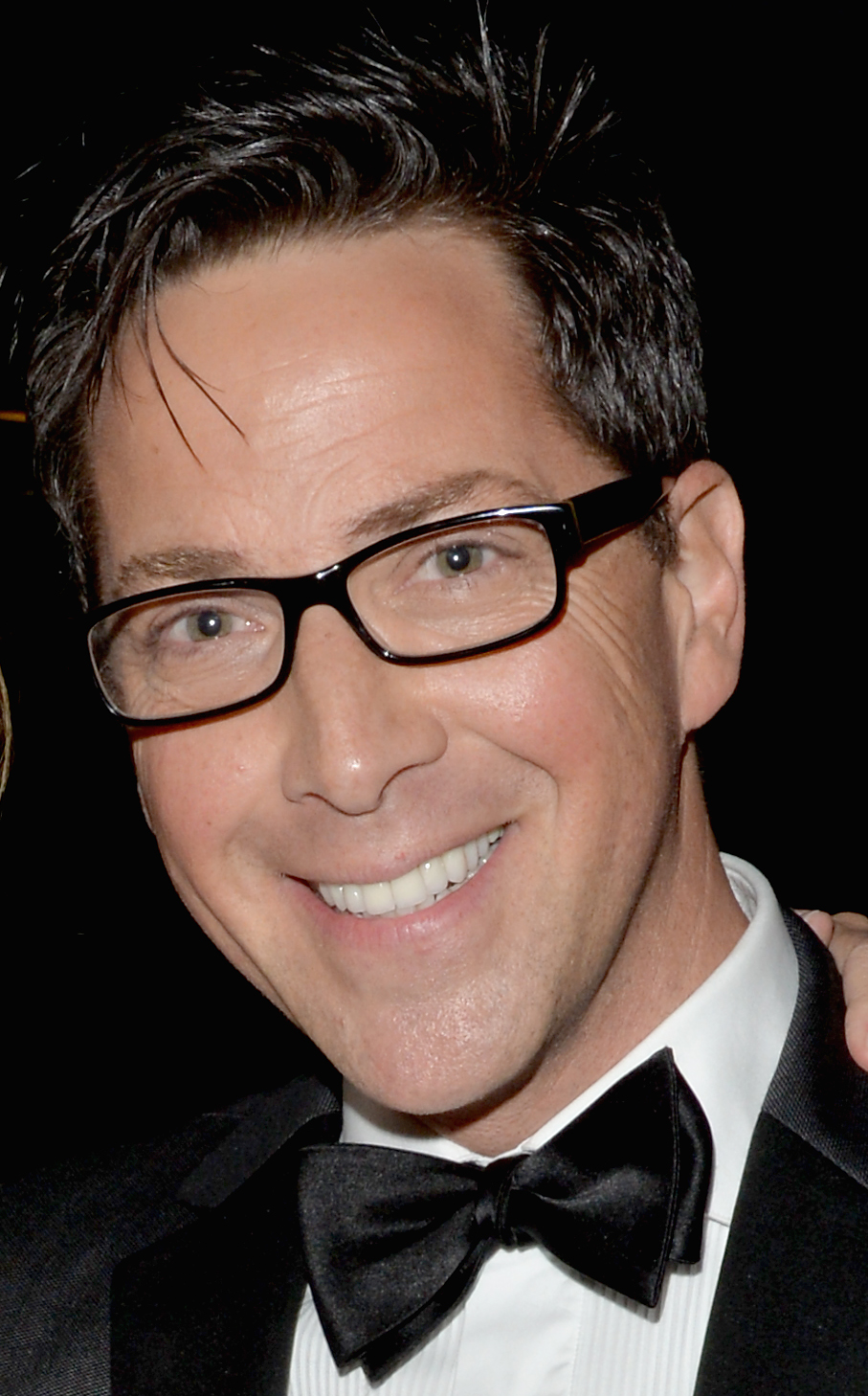
Seth Green (pictured in 2025), Kevin Dillon (2008), and Dan Bucatinsky (2014)
- Seth Green as Samuel Nicholas
- Kevin Dillon as Michael Quinn, a detective
- Charlie Weber as Billy Gray, a salesman
- Dylan Walsh as Tom Cartright, a congressman
- Eloise Lovell Anderson as Aurora Devereux, a high-class escort
- Dan Bucatinsky as Dr. Scott Stevens
- Chloe Fox as Celeste, a young woman and Tom's stepdaughter
  - Anaya Yalamov as seven-year-old Celeste
- Pancho Moler as Dante, Samuel's little-person assistant
- Miranda Heldt as Anna, Celeste's mother
- Joe Carmichael as Milton / Lomax, the hotel's twin concierges

== Production ==
On March 6, 2025, Dylan Walsh, Seth Green, and Charlie Weber were added to the cast of the film, which was directed by Tony Dean Smith, written by Gary Preisler based on a story by Steven Paul, and produced by Paul under his SP Media Group production company. On March 19, Dan Bucatinsky and Kevin Dillon were cast as well. Laurent Eyquem composed the score for the film. Ivan Vatsov served as the cinematographer, while Shaun Lang edited the film.

== Release ==
The film premiered at the Beverly Hills Film Festival on April 13, 2026, before being released digitally the following day, by Paramount Global Content Distribution through Republic Pictures.
