= Forever Fabulous =

- Directed by: Werner Molinsky
- Written by: Werner Molinsky
- Produced by: Jim Kohlberg; Robert Wagner; Alan Klingenstein
- Starring: Jean Smart; Jennifer Elise Cox; Robert Wagner; Emily Procter; Jorja Fox; Mink Stole; Jack Plotnick; Fred Dennis; Clay Adkins
- Cinematography: Tom Houghton
- Edited by: Joe D'Augustine
- Music by: Robbie Kondor
- Release date: October 7, 1999 (Austin Film Festival)
- Running time: 87 minutes
- Country: United States
- Language: English

Forever Fabulous is a 1999 comedy starring Jean Smart, Jennifer Elise Cox, Robert Wagner, Emily Proctor and Jorja Fox, which was written and directed by Werner Molinsky and initially screened under the title Tiara Tango at the 1999 Austin Film Festival. In 2001, the film began airing on the Lifetime Movie Network, where it aired periodically until early 2004.

== Plot ==
Loreli Daly is an over the hill beauty queen who left her home in Texas following a scandal and has spent recent years overseeing beauty pageants and living vicariously through her current beauty queen daughter, Corinne. On the day that Corrine graduates from beauty school, she discovers a crumpled piece of paper in the trash, asking Loreli to return to the Lonestar state to oversee the Miss Texas Tiara Quest competition. Desperate to ditch her mother and head off to Hollywood, Corrine enlists the help of her childhood friends, conniving reporter Tiffany Dawl and prison guard Liz Guild, to encourage Loreli to return to Texas so the girls can compete in one final pageant—and Tiffany plans to shoot footage of their trip for use in a beauty queen documentary for The Learning Channel. With further encouragement from her longtime boyfriend Lyle, Loreli agrees to the trip, and they all pack up in Lyle's Winnebago and hit the road. Soon after embarking on their trip, a freak mishap results in death, and the characters find themselves in a constant struggle to get back to Texas.

== Cast ==
- Jean Smart as Loreli Daly
- Jennifer Elise Cox as Corrine Daly
- Robert Wagner as Lyle Devereaux Green
- Emily Procter as Tiffany Dawl
- Jorja Fox as Liz Guild
- Mink Stole as Miss Vi Ambrose
- Jack Plotnick as Adam
- Fred Dennis as Stan Watts
- Clay Adkins as Miss Trixie Ballou
