= M.Y.O.B. (TV series) =

American television comedy series

- Also known as: Mind Your Own Business
- Genre: Sitcom
- Created by: Don Roos
- Starring: Katharine Towne; Lauren Graham
- Country of origin: United States
- Original language: English
- No. of seasons: 1
- No. of episodes: 4 (9 unaired)

Production
- Executive producers: Don Roos; Ann Donahue
- Camera setup: Single-camera
- Running time: 22 minutes
- Production companies: Charade Productions; NBC Studios

Original release
- Network: NBC
- Release: June 6 – June 27, 2000

M.Y.O.B. (also known as Mind Your Own Business) is an American sitcom starring Katharine Towne and Lauren Graham. The series premiered on NBC on June 6 and ended on June 27, 2000. Eight episodes were produced, but only four were aired by NBC. It was effectively burned off when The WB picked up Gilmore Girls to series the month before, which would star Graham.

== Cast and characters ==
=== Main ===
- Katharine Towne as Riley Veatch, a teen runaway from Akron, Ohio, who is searching for her birth mother
- Colin Mortensen as A.J. Swartz
- Lauren Graham as Opal Marie Brown, Riley's aunt and the assistant principal at Gossett High School
- Paul Fitzgerald as Mitch Levitt
- Amanda Detmer as Lisa Overbeck

=== Recurring ===
- Drew Hastings as Arthur, Lisa's Boyfriend
- Andy Dick as Nigel Thorns

=== Guest stars ===
- Alan Cumming as Dave

== Production ==
The pilot episode, filmed in early 1999, stars Nicki Aycox, with Elizabeth Perkins as the aunt.

== Episodes ==
The first two episodes of the series are registered with the United States Copyright Office.

No.	Title	Directed by	Written by	Original release date	Prod. code
1	"The Bad Seed"	Bryan Gordon	Don Roos	June 6, 2000	63501
2	"Boys in the Band"	Bryan Gordon	Ann Donahue	June 13, 2000	63502
3	"French Connection"	Victoria Hochberg	Jimmy Aleck & Jim Keily	June 20, 2000	63503
4	"Basic Instinct"	Stephen Cragg	Marc Dube	June 27, 2000	63504
5	"The Paper Chase"	N/A	N/A	Unaired	63505
6	"Coming to America"	N/A	N/A	Unaired	63506
7	"Out of Africa"	N/A	N/A	Unaired	63507
8	"Arms Akimbo"	N/A	N/A	Unaired	63508
