= Web Therapy (TV series) =

- Genre: Comedy; Improvisational comedy
- Created by: Lisa Kudrow; Don Roos; Dan Bucatinsky
- Directed by: Don Roos; Dan Bucatinsky
- Starring: Lisa Kudrow; Tim Bagley; Dan Bucatinsky; Jennifer Elise Cox; Victor Garber
- Composer: John Swihart
- Country of origin: United States
- Original language: English
- No. of seasons: 4
- No. of episodes: 43 (list of episodes)

Production
- Executive producers: Lisa Kudrow; Dan Bucatinsky; Diane Charles; Ron Qurashi
- Cinematography: Michael Goi
- Running time: 23-34 minutes
- Production companies: Showtime Networks; Is or Isn't Entertainment; LStudio

Original release
- Network: Showtime
- Release: July 19, 2011 – January 28, 2015

Related
- Web Therapy (internet series)

Web Therapy is an American comedy television series that premiered on Showtime on July 19, 2011. It is based on the web series of the same name and stars Lisa Kudrow as Fiona Wallice, a therapist who works with patients over the Internet.

Web Therapy initially received mixed reviews from critics but has since received more positive reviews, with many critics praising Kudrow's performance.

On August 11, 2015, Showtime cancelled the series after four seasons.

== Plot ==
Fiona Wallice (Lisa Kudrow) leaves her position at the Lachman Brothers financial institution under dubious circumstances. Though she is uncredentialed, she has ventured into the world of therapy but, uninspired by the tedium of normal fifty-minute sessions, conceives a new practice: the titular "web therapy", wherein sessions are conducted online and in three minutes. Fiona jumpstarts her Web Therapy business and takes on clients including her former colleague Richard Pratt (Tim Bagley), a noted psychiatrist (Bob Balaban), a psychic (Courteney Cox), and returning patient Jerome Sokoloff (Dan Bucatinsky). Fiona receives little support from her lawyer husband, Kip Wallice (Victor Garber) and her disapproving mother, Putsy Hodge (Lily Tomlin). She instead blackmails Lachman Brothers, alleging vague details of sexual assault involving Richard in the hopes that they will fund her practice, and uses Lachman's secretary, ditsy Gina Spinks (Jennifer Elise Cox), to her advantage. Meanwhile, one of Fiona's new patients, Robin Griner (Julie Claire), claims to be intimately involved with Fiona's husband, Kip. Robin later reveals that their date night was a disaster because Kip only hit on her thinking she was a transvestite. Fiona has Jerome, who works at Visa, infiltrate Kip's finances to see his purchasing history; Jerome is fired for this confidentiality breach but Fiona instead employs him as her assistant for extremely low pay. Fiona falls in love with her newest client, business magnate Austen Clarke (Alan Cumming). Fiona reveals to Kip that she intends on leaving him for Austen after her discovery that he is gay. Although Kip denies this, he reveals that he has been enlisted to run for U.S. Congress, representing the Philadelphia area. Fiona and Austen agree to postpone their relationship until after the election. Fiona also begins writing an exposé titled Whistling While I Worked, which details Fiona's experience at Lachman Brothers—although Jerome ghostwrites the entire book.

Having launched his congressional campaign, Kip secretly undergoes conversion therapy overseen by Camilla Bowner (Meryl Streep). After Camilla suggests that Kip leave his wife, Fiona reveals that she has orchestrated Kip seducing Camilla's closeted husband. Meanwhile, Robin Griner returns and blackmails Fiona with Kip's homosexuality; in exchange, Fiona insists that Kip's campaign manager, Ben Tomlund (Michael McDonald), give Robin a position on the campaign as a documentarian. Ben requests that Fiona actually receive credentials to treat patients; Fiona complies after completing sessions with her sister Shevaun (Julia Louis-Dreyfus), institutionalizing their mother in the process. Ben also insists that she postpone the publishing of her book until after the campaign, although her galley proof is briefly optioned to adapt into a film starring actress Allegra Favreau (Minnie Driver). Meanwhile, Fiona treats Conan O'Brien, discovers she has a stalker (David Schwimmer), sends Gina to Alaska to work at Austen's cannery, and exposes Jerome's surrogate (Selma Blair) as a scammer. Fiona's mother Putsy calls from an institution and has the idea for a new business venture after her experience in the facility: Net Therapy, four minute therapy sessions conducted over the internet for a dollar cheaper than Web Therapy. Fiona is incensed when Jerome reveals he will be taking a leave of absence to help Putsy establish her business. Elsewhere, Fiona's frustration with Ben erupts when she suspects that he and Kip are having an affair. After Robin reveals that she's recorded gay sex tapes implicating Kip and Ben, Fiona fires her. Robin publishes the tapes, destroying Kip's campaign. With her marriage to Kip appearing dead, Fiona finally can be with Austen—except he has impregnated Gina after meeting her in Alaska.

Fiona goes to a resort in Laguna Beach to clear her head while Kip runs off to New Mexico with Ben. Austen intends on marrying Gina so as not to bring dishonor to his name. To apologize to Fiona, he buys her a penthouse in New York and purchases Net Therapy, only to shelve it immediately. Jerome returns to work for Fiona for an even lower salary; he briefly spearheads an effort to adapt Whistling While I Worked into a musical written by renowned playwright Franny Marshall (Megan Mullally). With Kip and Fiona forced by Ben to file for divorce, Fiona is investigated for the misuse of campaign finances and suspects that Ben is responsible. Seeking to prove her innocence, Fiona needs passwords to the campaign finance accounts that were located in Kip's briefcase, which were unknowingly sold on eBay to a hoarder (Meg Ryan) obsessed with Kip. Fiona recovers a shredded diary that implicates Ben, who takes a plea deal in exchange for a lighter prison sentence. Meanwhile, Web Therapy continues to grow as Fiona treats a compulsive gambler (Matt LeBlanc), an online couple who has not met before (Darren Criss and Mae Whitman), a woman with an office romance (Sara Gilbert), and a former lover who has since had a sex-change operation (Chelsea Handler). Gina gives birth to her baby, Angus; Jerome is revealed to be the father, triggering a divorce between Austen and Gina. Austen proposes to Fiona; but when he reveals that he has given his fortune away and wants her to live with him in a mud hut in Africa, she breaks up with him. Jerome receives $20,000,000 from Austen for Angus's trust fund and plans to move into the luxurious house next door to Fiona to raise the child with Gina. Elsewhere, Kip and Fiona decide not to proceed with their divorce, and Putsy reveals that she will be masterminding the resurrection of Kip's judicial career. She also reveals that she has written a book falsely alleging elder abuse at the hands of Fiona. After meeting with the book's publisher, Gareth Pink (Billy Crystal), Fiona discovers that he will be marrying Putsy and, per Putsy's request, threatens Fiona to shut down Web Therapy.

Gareth discovers that Putsy is a nightmare to be with and suspects that she is having an affair. Fiona is allowed to restart her Web Therapy business and attempts to appear more caring, per Gareth's advice. Her new clients include a rageful meditation teacher (Gwyneth Paltrow), an anxious lottery winner (Jesse Tyler Ferguson), a phone sex operator for the elderly (Jon Hamm), a headmistress seeking help with an impending marriage (Allison Janney), a lawyer who is also a compulsive liar (Matthew Perry), and Project Runway judge Nina Garcia. Jerome continues to raise baby Angus next door to Fiona, although his constant construction projects prove burdensome to Fiona. Gina begins selling sex toys and is sent to a clinic for sexual rehabilitation after an incident with Jerome. Meanwhile, Putsy reveals that her plan for Kip involves getting him on the Pennsylvania Supreme Court and murdering one of the judges to ensure a vacancy—although she has back pain at the last minute and enlists Jerome to cut the brakes on the justice's car. Jerome is imprisoned and signs away custody of Angus and the trust fund to Fiona, who pays Gina (back from rehab) to be the child's full-time nanny and mother. Fiona is contacted by National Security Agency analyst Abel Jans (Dax Shepard), who finds Fiona's sessions endlessly entertaining. However, Abel's roommate leaks all of Fiona's sessions. This sparks a media firestorm, and Fiona is condemned as one of the most hated women in America. This scandal dashes the judicial hopes of Kip, who plans on reuniting with Ben at a spiritual retreat in Montana. A fixer named Jenny (Christina Applegate) is able to diminish the hate towards Fiona and reveals that Google is finally interested in purchasing Web Therapy. In return, Jenny asks that Fiona set up a meeting with Putsy, as Jenny suspects that she and Fiona were switched at birth. To the delight of all three, the DNA test confirms Jenny's suspicions. The series ends with Fiona being contacted by Austen, who has just discovered oil and diamonds in Africa and wants to marry her.

== Cast ==
- Lisa Kudrow as Fiona Wallice, a self-professed web therapist who offers quick therapy sessions over the internet. At the beginning of the first season, she is focused on building her own franchise, especially after having been involved in a mysterious scandal towards the end of her previous career in finance. The series gradually reveals that Fiona has just as many issues as her patients: she was obese as a child; she was ignored by her parents in favor of her sister; she was nearly thrown out of college for plagiarism and sleeping with her professor; and her husband, Kip, is secretly gay. She refuses to acknowledge any of these problems, however, and is not smart enough to realize that most of the people in her life dislike her, and is too narcissistic to care. She eventually develops a softer side, however, as she learns to care (in her way) for the people around her.

=== Recurring cast ===
- Dan Bucatinsky as Jerome Sokoloff, an employee services worker at Visa who is Fiona's only holdover from her 50-minute sessions. After a disastrous attempt to use Jerome and Hayley's apparent incest to capitalize on Web Therapy, she uses him to check on her husband's extracurricular activities. This results in Jerome losing his job because of his alarming assertiveness, but to make up for that, she gives him a job as her personal assistant. Along with helping Fiona write her book, Jerome dabbles in side projects without Fiona's consent (submitting unused chapters to Fiona's publisher, arranging Hayley to tag along on Fiona's trip to visit Allegra, helping Hayley with two movie projects which contain elements of her life and allowing Hayley to stay in Fiona's New York home to entertain clients).
- Victor Garber as Kip Wallice, Fiona's long-suffering, closeted husband of 19 years (since 1994) who is also her attorney. Fiona discovers his sexual proclivities when Robin tells her Kip tried to seduce her because he thought she was a transvestite; she also learns about his secret life after finding receipts for gay pornography and sex toys. When she confronts him on his behavior, he denies that he is gay, claiming there is a conspiracy against him and that he bought the items for a co-worker's bachelor party. He then says that he wants her to be his wife while he runs for Congress. Fiona is forced to play the role of supportive wife for a while, even at the expense of her romance with Austen, but her discovery of Kip's relationship with Ben reconfirms her earlier suspicions, and it does not take her long to let Robin reveal the relationship through taped footage. While Kip and Ben go to New Mexico afterwards, Kip and Fiona begin divorce proceedings in order to move on with their lives.
- Lily Tomlin as Putsy Hodge, Fiona's wealthy, unloving mother. Putsy thinks Web Therapy is a ridiculous waste of time and an embarrassment, and she lets Fiona know it in no uncertain terms. Initially introduced as a woman who seems to favor Kip over her two daughters, Putsy develops a mentally unstable personality as she takes in a son she put up for adoption long before marrying Fiona's father, resulting in Fiona stopping him from stealing from her, starts to exhibit even less motherly behaviour towards her grandchildren, and even starts a Net Therapy business running in competition with Fiona's Web Therapy.
- Jennifer Elise Cox as Gina Spinks, the ditsy receptionist at Fiona's former workplace and her best friend. Gina looks up to Fiona as a role model and follows her advice, and Fiona sees Gina as the only female connection to her former workplace. Gina is there to provide favors for Fiona relating to her investors at Web Therapy, and can dish out important information about her co-workers, including Richard, and in return, Fiona gives relationship advice to Gina, helps her find a job in Alaska during hard times, and helps her and Austen draw up terms for a pre-nup mostly in Gina's favor. Their close friendship is strong that they engage in web-chat mocktails together and engage in "girl-talk" even when other people are in the room.
- Tim Bagley as Richard Pratt, Fiona's former co-worker whose relationship issues Fiona solves. Afterward she inadvertently disorients the relationship causing Richard to develop feelings for her. He stalks her until Fiona threatens to terminate contact between them unless he tones his behaviour down. Fiona later gets him a job with Kip's campaign, during which he starts dating Robin. However, Robin thinks that this is only because he is still in love with Fiona. Fiona discovers Robin is being hurtful toward Richard, and she fires Robin. Richard takes this as a romantic gesture. He nevertheless marries Robin soon afterwards, although he still feels her condescending behaviour is affecting him.
- Julie Claire as Robin Griner, a gossip girl documentarian who tries to begin a relationship with Kip, discovers his gay tendencies first and becomes the primary antagonist of the series. She wants to reunite with Fiona, but after discovering her side of the story, threatens to release her recording of the conversation unless she gets a job in the campaign. The job does not last long as Fiona discovers Robin is dating Richard as a rebound, has tapes exposing Kip and Ben's relationship, and is condescending to Richard; he fires her. After releasing the tapes and putting the campaign in jeopardy, Robin marries Richard, has an affair leaving the paternity of her child uncertain, and is contacted by Fiona to hand over the tapes to prove her innocence, while Fiona also expresses interest in her work and to reunite.
- Alan Cumming as Austen Clarke, a worldwide media mogul who happens to do good deeds to people in poor countries, and Fiona's main love interest. Fiona seems to have much more in common with Austen than with her own husband, and it is by luck that she secures both a book publishing deal and a potential romance with him. Their romance has been put on long-term hold twice, the first time being Kip's campaign, for which Austen becomes a backer, and the second when Fiona discovers Austen may have impregnated Gina during their time apart. While Fiona tries to distance herself from Austen, he manages to gain Fiona's forgiveness by buying her a dream penthouse apartment in New York and shelving Putsy's Web Therapy.
- Rashida Jones as Hayley Feldman-Tate, Jerome's fiancée and later his wife. After some sibling-rivalry sessions that she became uncomfortable with, Hayley has developed a strange personality, as she expects Jerome to handle and pay for her expensive demands for the wedding, is arrested for mysterious scissors in her luggage before her trip, entertains clients at Fiona's New York house, and is mentioned by her surrogate that she hates Fiona. However, on top of that, she helps Jerome help rework Fiona's book, becomes a head writer for the movie adaptation and becomes Fiona's personal assistant while Jerome takes leave, but Fiona thinks that Hayley is less reliable than Jerome.
- Michael McDonald as Ben Tomlund, Kip's campaign manager. He clashes with Fiona on several issues, is the first to actively warn her to suspend her treatment modality to get her accreditation, and is discovered by Fiona to be having an affair with Kip. After the campaign, Fiona becomes suspicious that Ben is trying to set her up during an investigation.

=== Guest stars ===
Kudrow's former Friends costars David Schwimmer, Matthew Perry, Matt LeBlanc and Courteney Cox have all appeared as guest stars on Web Therapy. Other guest stars that have appeared over the course of the series include: Maulik Pancholy, Steven Weber, Bob Balaban, Jane Lynch, Rosie O'Donnell, Selma Blair, Conan O'Brien, Molly Shannon, Steve Carell, Minnie Driver, Meryl Streep, Julia Louis-Dreyfus, Meg Ryan, Sara Gilbert, Chelsea Handler, Megan Mullally, Mae Whitman, Darren Criss, Billy Crystal, Calista Flockhart, Jon Hamm, Caspar Lee, Gwyneth Paltrow, Dax Shepard, Craig Ferguson, Jesse Tyler Ferguson, Lauren Graham, Nina García, Allison Janney and Christina Applegate.

Jennifer Aniston was approached by Kudrow to appear as a guest star before the series got cancelled.

== Episodes ==
Season	Episodes	Originally released	
Season	Episodes	First released	Last released
1	10	July 19, 2011	September 20, 2011
2	11	July 2, 2012	September 9, 2012
3	10	July 23, 2013	September 24, 2013
4	12	October 22, 2014	January 28, 2015

== Production ==
In April 2010, Showtime announced plans to run the online episodes on television with extra scenes being shot to fit the half-hour format. The TV version was given 10 half-hour episodes for its first season. The series is executive produced by Lisa Kudrow, Diane Charles, Ron Qurashi and Dan Bucatinsky, produced by Jodi Binstock, co-executive produced by Jodi Binstock and David Codron, and the production company Is or Isn't Entertainment. The series has all the guest stars from the online series appearing.

In December 2011, Showtime renewed Web Therapy for a second season of 11 episodes, which premiered on July 2, 2012. On November 16, 2012, Web Therapy was renewed for a 10 episode third season by Showtime. On January 14, 2014, Showtime renewed Web Therapy for a 12 episode fourth season.

=== Casting ===
The TV series features more of Fiona's personal life instead of just her patient sessions, and introduces Victor Garber as Kip Wallice, Fiona's long-suffering husband who is also her attorney, and Lily Tomlin as Putsy Hodge, Fiona's proper upper-crust mother who is having money troubles. Putsy thinks web therapy is a ridiculous waste of time and an embarrassment, and she lets Fiona know it in no uncertain terms. New cast members introduced for the TV series include: Jennifer Elise Cox as Gina Spinks, the ditsy receptionist at Fiona's former workplace, and Maulik Pancholy as Kamal Prakash, an IT worker from Kip's office whom Fiona recruits to help set up her internet system.

== Reception ==
The first season of Web Therapy received mixed reviews, scoring a 55 out of 100 on Metacritic, based on 10 critics, indicating "mixed or average reviews". On Rotten Tomatoes the first season of the show has a rating of 45%, based on 11 reviews, with an average rating of 5/10. The site's consensus reads, "Web Therapy quickly wears out its welcome by not providing consistent laughs or an energizing plot." Sal Cinquemani from Slant Magazine said "the often painful Web Therapy is almost completely reliant on its dialogue and acting". Mary McNamara from Los Angeles Times, gave the season a positive review, saying that the show is "innovative and hilarious". The performances of the guest stars, such as Lily Tomlin and Meryl Streep, have received praise.

The second season received critical acclaim, scoring 83 out of 100 on Metacritic, with many critics praising the chemistry between Kudrow and the show's guest stars. Jessica Shaw of Entertainment Weekly praised the show's writing: "Lisa Kudrow is hilarious as online shrink Fiona Wallice, but her true talent is making those around her even funnier". Curt Wagner of Red Eye praised the improvisational skills of the cast, writing: "It's mostly improvised, which makes the funny exchanges between Kudrow and her guest stars even more impressive." Mark A. Perigard of The Boston Herald gave the show a positive review during a joint review of Web Therapy and Kudrow's former Friends co-star, Matt LeBlanc's show Episodes, calling it "far more entertaining [than Episodes], but, alas, wildly uneven, probably in part due to the need to weave new material around the Internet series of the same name that spawned it.

The third season also saw extremely positive reviews from critics, with praise especially reserved for Megan Mullally's performance. Clark Collins of Entertainment Weekly praised the show, with praise reserved for Mullally's performance. Matthew Wolfson gave the season a positive review, giving it three stars out of five.

== Home media ==
Web Therapy: The Complete First Season was released on DVD in Region 1 on June 19, 2012, and in Region 4 on August 7, 2013. The two-disc set contains all 10 episodes from season one.

Web Therapy: The Complete Second Season was released on Region 1 DVD on June 18, 2013. The two-disc set contains all 11 episodes from season two, plus an unaired episode named "Royally F****d", in which Fiona gets her first international client (Natasha Bedingfield) calling from Buckingham Palace. Special features include a behind-the-scenes featurette, director cuts with Conan O'Brien and Meryl Streep, an auto-tune music video, deleted scenes, and gag reels.

== International versions ==
On 2 February 2016, a Spanish remake also titled Web Therapy aired on #0, the flagship TV channel of subscription platform Movistar+. The remake was produced by FreemantleMedia. It stars Eva Hache as Rebeca Miller, the equivalent of Fiona Wallice in the original series.

On 29 August 2017, it was announced that Stephen Mangan would star in and co-write a British adaptation titled Hang Ups for Channel 4 in the United Kingdom. It premiered on 8 August 2018.

On 7 May 2018, the Israeli version הפסיכולוגית (The Psychologist) was uploaded to YouTube. On 18 July 2018, it premiered on TV, on channel כאן 11. Keren Mor starred in the leading role of therapist Tuti Liblich.

On 21 October 2015, the Polish version of Web Therapy premiered on Player.pl, with Agata Kulesza playing the lead role of Dr. Lucyna Kole-Bojarska.

Beginning in 2017, the Québécoise adaptation Web Thérapie) began airing on the TV station TV5 Québec Canada. Like the original version, this adaptation has many notable Québécois(es) and French Canadian stars in supporting and guest roles. Édith Cochrane plays the lead role of aspiring therapist, Florence Champagne.
