= Jennifer Elise Cox =

American actress

- Born: November 29, 1969 (age 56); New York City, U.S.
- Education: California Institute of the Arts (BFA)
- Occupation: Actress
- Years active: 1995–present
- Spouse: Lee Brownstein

Jennifer Elise Cox (born November 29, 1969) is an American actress known for her satirical portrayal of Jan Brady in The Brady Bunch Movie and A Very Brady Sequel.

== Life and career ==
Cox was born in New York City and raised in Manhattan's Lower East Side, where she played in two operas, Don Giovanni and Madam Butterfly.

After graduating from a performing arts high school Cox moved to Los Angeles with her mother, Kate. She attended the California Institute of the Arts and earned a Bachelor of Fine Arts degree in acting. While getting into acting, Cox scooped ice cream at Ben & Jerry's, and made money by playing cards when she was struggling.

She married director/producer Lee Brownstein, and starred in his 2013 film Out West.

=== Jan Brady ===
In 1995, Cox won the role she became widely known for, middle-child Jan Brady in the film The Brady Bunch Movie. Speaking of the cast, "We instantly bonded", said Cox. "We instantly thought of each other as family, as The Brady Bunch."

The film opened at #1 at the box office with $14,827,066 and grossed $46,576,136, in the U.S. and Canada and $7,500,000 overseas making a total gross of $54,076,136 worldwide. Although the film received a mixed reception, Cox's performance was praised. Patrick Phillips from Pop Culture Tonight called her performance "excellent, yet underrated".

A reviewer from The Motion Pictures stated "Cox pulls off all of [the] nuttiness perfectly. She is without a doubt the best part of the movie." A week after The Brady Bunch Movie's opening she had a guest spot on The George Wendt Show. The same year she reprised her role as Jan Brady for the TV series Wings, and portrayed Shannon, a student at the women's studies program, on the TV series Murphy Brown.

In 1996, she co-starred alongside Michael Gross and Hilary Swank in the horror film Sometimes They Come Back... Again, reprised her role of Jan Brady in the Brady Bunch sequel A Very Brady Sequel, and guest starred on an episode of The Parent 'Hood.

In 1998, she had a recurring role as social outcast Felice on the sitcom Clueless, and reprised her role of Jan Brady on the TV series Moesha. That year she also had small bits in the films Fear and Loathing in Las Vegas and Can't Hardly Wait.

=== Later career ===
In 1999, she signed on to star alongside Jean Smart in Tiara Tango, later retitled Forever Fabulous. The film went through a troubled history while being made, as actresses Cathy Moriarty and Suzanne Pleshette both had parts before quitting due to massive rewrites of the script. The film struggled with money and due to budget constraints, an entire scene had to be eliminated and rewritten. Cox stated she didn't even receive a salary for recording the film's voice-over narration. The film premiered at the 1999 Austin Film Festival. Cox had a small role in the film EdTV.

In 2000, she guest starred on an episode of Sex and the City, and on an episode of Will & Grace. It took several takes just for Will & Grace star Debra Messing to get past the first line of Cox's character, Nurse Pitman. Messing would later tell US Weekly this was because she couldn't "look at her without seeing Jan Brady."

Cox then became a main cast member on Hype, an American sketch comedy television series on The WB,

However, due to low ratings the show was canceled. The next year it was announced Cox would reunite with The Brady Bunch Movie co-star and friend Alanna Ubach, in Life After Donna Dell. Described as a dark, campy, 1950s musical, it was written by Ubach herself. However, the film was later scrapped.

In 2005, she appeared on three episodes of Six Feet Under, two episodes of Twins, and one episode of The Comeback.

In August 2006, she began playing the recurring role of receptionist Tiffany Riley Clarke on Lovespring International. However, the show was cancelled months later. Soon after, she was cast as Amy Anderson, a recurring role on the improvised American comedy series 10 Items or Less. She would go on to play the character till 2009, when this show was cancelled.

In 2009, she made five appearances on the Lifetime original sitcom Rita Rocks. She was in talks to play the character more for the next season, however Lifetime canceled the series. The next year she played a small role in the film The Back-Up Plan.

In 2011, she had roles on multiple films, Balls to the Wall, Poolboy: Drowning Out the Fury, Eating Out: The Open Weekend, A Holiday Engagement and Spooky Buddies. She also had a recurring role on Pretty the Series, and she joined the cast of Web Therapy as the recurring role of Gina Spinks. She would play Gina until August 11, 2015, when Showtime cancelled the series after four seasons.

In 2013, she made three guest appearances as Gina on Web Therapy, the Web series on which Web Therapy is based.

== Filmography ==
=== Film ===
Year	Title	Role	Notes
1995	The Brady Bunch Movie	Jan Brady	
1996	Sometimes They Come Back... Again	Jules Martin	
1996	A Very Brady Sequel	Jan Brady	
1999	EDtv	College girl	
1999	Forever Fabulous	Corinne Daly	
2000	Dropping Out	Mellissa	
2001	Hitclown	Clown	Short film
2003	Testosterone	Sharon	
2004	Straight-Jacket	Betty Bright	
2005	Rainbow's End	Boss	Short film
2005	Hard Pill	Tanya	
2006	The Enigma with a Stigma	Theresa Herman	
2007	Cook Off!	Cassandra Dougherty	
2009	Jesus People: The Movie	Trinity Celeste	
2010	Evil Shrink	Molly	Short film
2010	The Back-up Plan	Sales assistant	
2011	Poolboy: Drowning Out the Fury	Rita	
2011	Spooky Buddies	Mrs. Carroll	
2011	Eating Out: The Open Weekend	Hotel Clerk	
2012	Love or Whatever	Kelsey	
2012	Santa Paws 2: The Santa Pups	Blue Bright	
2013	Playdate	Fran	
2013	Platypus the Musical	Patti Johnson	Short film
2013	Out West	Prissy Alcott	
2014	Terry the Tomboy	Unfathomable Aunt Peyton	TV movie
2014	Correcting Christmas	Ginny	TV movie
2021	Blending Christmas	Tina	TV movie

=== Television ===
Year	Title	Role	Notes
1995	The George Wendt Show	Ashley	Episode: "Prom Night: The Return"
1995	Wings	Jan Brady	Episode: "A House to Die For"
1995	Murphy Brown	Shannon	Episode: "The Feminine Critique"
1996	The Parent 'Hood	Chris	Episode: "Labor Daze"
1996	A Weekend in the Country	Arista Farrell	Television film
1997	Clueless	Felice Lesser	2 episodes
1998	Moesha	Jan Brady	Episode: "Hello, What's This?"
1999	Sagamore	Shelly	Television film
2000	Will & Grace	Nurse Pittman	Episode: "The Hospital Show"
2000	Sex & the City	P.R. Girl	Episode: "Sex and another city"
2000–2001	Hype	Various	16 episodes
2003	The Gavin Crawford Show	Tandy	Episode: "1.21"
2003	Greetings from Tucson	Gabby	Episode: "The Breakup"
2003	Rock Me, Baby	Kate	Episode: "Pilot"
2004	Wanda Does It	Jen	Episode: "Wanda Does Repo"
2005	My Wife and Kids	Nancy	Episode: "Silence Is Golden"
2005	Six Feet Under	Mary	3 episodes
2005	The Comeback	Miss Hollywood	Episode: "Valerie Relaxes in Palm Springs"
2005	Twins	Cara	Episode: "Sister's Keeper"
2005	Todd's Coma	Trina	Television film
2006	Twins	Cara	Episode: "Blast from the Past"
2006	The New Adventures of Old Christine	Natalie	Episode: "A Long Day's Journey Into Stan"
2006	CSI: NY	Melanie Stefano	Episode: "Run Silent, Run Deep"
2006	Lovespring International	Tiffany Riley Clark	13 episodes
2006	Nip/Tuck	Annie McNamara (2026)	Episode: "Conor McNamara, 2026"
2006–2008	10 Items or Less	Amy Anderson	13 episodes
2007	Mind of Mencia	Chelsea Clinton	Episode: "Sensitivity Training"
2008	Pushing Daisies	Elise Hofer	Episode: "Robbing Hood"
2009	Privileged	Jennifer	Episode: "All About Betrayal"
2009	Rita Rocks	Miss Ricker	5 episodes
2009	Eastwick	Karen	Episode: "Magic Snow and Creepy Gene"
2010	Svetlana	Krystal	2 episodes
2010	Pair of Kings	Lady of the Cave	Episode: "Kings of Legend: Part Two"
2010–2011	Pretty	Lucy Devonshire	5 episodes
2011	Holiday Engagement	Connie	Television film
2011–2015	Web Therapy	Gina Spinks	21 episodes
2012	In Plain Sight	Beth Wilcox / Beth Webb	Episode: "Four Marshals and a Baby"
2013	The Client List	Olivia	Episode: "I Ain't Broke But I'm Badly Bent"
2013	2 Broke Girls	Miss Trudy	Episode: "And the Window of Opportunity"
2014	Back to Christmas	Ginny	Television film
2015	It's Always Sunny in Philadelphia	Lizzie	Episode: "The Gang Beats Boggs"
2016	Idiotsitter	Tanzy Russell	10 Episodes
2016	12 Deadly Days	Geri	Episode: "Reindeer Games"
2017	Where the Bears Are	Laureen Flynn	3 episodes
2020	The Last Saturday Night	Paloma	
2021	Mr. Mayor	Gale	Episode: "#PalmTreeReform"
2022	2 Cops and a Car	Mayor Collins	2 episodes
2023	Mrs. Davis	Sister Fiona	2 episodes
2024	Abbott Elementary	Joan	Episode: "Willard R. Abbott"
