= Dan Bucatinsky =

American actor, writer and producer

- Bucatinsky in 2026
- Born: New York City, New York, USA
- Occupation: Actor
- Years active: 1994–present
- Spouse: Don Roos (m. 2008)
- Children: 2

Dan Bucatinsky (/ˌbʊkəˈtɪnski/) is an American actor, writer and producer, best known for his role as James Novak in the Shonda Rhimes drama series Scandal, for which he won the Primetime Emmy Award for Outstanding Guest Actor in a Drama Series in 2013. In 2014, Bucatinsky starred on NBC's Marry Me, as well as the revived HBO series The Comeback, which he also executive produced.

== Early life and education ==
Bucatinsky was born in New York City. He is the son of Jewish parents Julio and Myriam. Their families moved from Russia and Poland to Argentina. Bucatinsky went to Horace Greeley High School in Chappaqua, New York, where he was friends with Heather Dubrow from Real Housewives of Orange County. He is a graduate of Vassar College in Poughkeepsie, New York.

== Career ==
Bucatinsky was the writer, producer and star of the 2001 romantic comedy All Over the Guy. He has appeared in episodes of many television series, including Curb Your Enthusiasm, Weeds, Friends, NYPD Blue, That '80s Show, Frasier, and Will & Grace, as well as an episode of Grey's Anatomy (where Bucatinsky also serves as a consulting producer). He executive produced and acted in the 2005 HBO series The Comeback along with his producing partner, actress Lisa Kudrow. In 2008, Bucatinsky and Lisa Kudrow again worked as producers for the innovative and largely improvisational web series, Web Therapy, in which Kudrow starred and Bucatinsky also acted; Don Roos, his husband, directed.

Bucatinsky had a recurring role as a journalist and husband of the President's Chief of Staff on the ABC drama series, Scandal, for which he won the 2013 Primetime Emmy Award for Outstanding Guest Actor in a Drama Series.

From 2014 to 2015, Bucatinsky co-starred on the short-lived NBC sitcom Marry Me, where he and Tim Meadows play "The Kevins", the gay dads of Annie (played by Casey Wilson) who are both named Kevin. He started out as a recurring guest star, but was promoted to series regular midway through the series.

He also wrote the book Does This Baby Make Me Look Straight?: Confessions of a Gay Dad.

== Personal life ==
Bucatinsky met his future husband, screenwriter Don Roos, in 1992 when Roos invited him to be his date at the premiere of Love Field. They married in 2008, during the four months same-sex marriage in California was first recognized. The couple have two children, daughter Eliza and son Jonah.

== Filmography ==
=== Film ===
Year	Title	Role	Notes
1998	The Opposite of Sex	Timothy	
2001	All Over the Guy	Eli Wyckoff	
2001	The Sky Is Falling	Lab Technician	
2003	I Love Your Work	The Director	
2003	Under the Tuscan Sun	Rodney	
2005	When Do We Eat?	High Strung Client	
2017	The Post	Joe Alsop	
2018	Second Act	Arthur	
2023	Air	Richard	
2024	Our Little Secret	Leonard	
2026	The Highest Stakes	Dr. Scott Stevens	

=== Television ===
Year	Title	Role	Notes
1994	Another Midnight Run	Bellhop	TV movie
1996	Party of Five	Check Out Guy	1 episode
1997	Night Stand	Sam	1 episode
1997	High Incident	Bootz Brotman	1 episode
1997	Jenny	Carl	1 episode
1997	Fame L.A.	Drew Douglas	1 episode
1998	Significant Others	Josh	1 episode
1998	Cybill	Troy	1 episode
1998	Maggie	Mr. Sampson	1 episode
1998	The Pretender	Emery	1 episode
1998	Chicago Hope	Politico Man	1 episode
2000, 2018	Will & Grace	Neil	2 episodes
2000	M.Y.O.B.	Reuben	2 episodes
2001	Rocket Power	Sportscaster	1 episode
2002	Frasier	Jewelry Clerk	1 episode
2002	That '80s Show	Rick	1 episode
2002	NYPD Blue	PAA David 'Dave' Moore	2 episodes
2002	MDs	Kurt	1 episode
2002	Friends	Waiter	Episode: "The One with Phoebe's Birthday Dinner"
2005, 2014, 2026	The Comeback	Billy Stanton	12 episodes; also executive producer
2006	Weeds	Max	1 episode
2007	Curb Your Enthusiasm	Cell-Phone Jerk	1 episode
2008	Dirt	Dillon Frawley	1 episode
2008	CSI: Miami	Oscar Serino	1 episode
2008–2014	Web Therapy	Jerome Sokoloff	Web series; also creator and executive producer Nominated – Primetime Emmy Award for Outstanding Short-Format Live-Action Entertainment Program (2012)
2010	Grey's Anatomy	Jeffrey	1 episode, Consulting producer – 36 episodes, Written by – 1 episode.
2011–2012	In Plain Sight	Fred Zeitlin	3 episodes
2011–2015	Web Therapy	Jerome Sokoloff	TV series; also creator and executive producer
2012–2015	Scandal	James Novak	Recurring role Primetime Emmy Award for Outstanding Guest Actor in a Drama Series (2013)
2014–2015	Marry Me	Kevin 2	Series regular
2015	The Hotwives of Las Vegas	Maxwell Octavius	1 episode
2016	Superstore	Steve	1 episode
2016	Gilmore Girls: A Year in the Life	Jim Nelson	1 episode
2017	24: Legacy	Andy Shalowitz	12 episodes
2017	Hell's Kitchen	Himself	Episode: "Catch of the Day"
2018	The Good Doctor	Spence	1 episode
2018	Grace & Frankie	Arnold	1 episode
2019	All Rise	Tim Landy	Episode: "Uncommon Women and Mothers"
2020	The Baker and the Beauty	Lewis	Recurring
2021	Mom	Arthur	Episode: "Vinyl Flooring and a Cartoon Bear"
2021	Rebel	Professor Jason Erickson	4 episodes
2021	The Sex Lives of College Girls	Danny Marawitz	Episode: "Kappa"
2022	A Million Little Things	Harrison	Episode: "Fingers Crossed"
2022–2023	How I Met Your Father	Fred	2 episodes
2022–2023	Chicago Med	Richard Evans	2 episodes
2024	Elsbeth	Kidder Hawes	Episode: "Gold, Frankincense, and Murder"
2024–2025	Hacks	Rob	10 episodes
