= Julie Claire =

American actress

- Occupation: Actress
- Years active: 1992–present
- Relatives: Larry David (uncle)

Julie Claire is an American actress known for her recurring roles on the TV series Bloodline, and Devious Maids.

She has also appeared Dirt, in 24 as Eden Linley, and in Web Therapy as Robin Griner. She appeared in the 2013 comedy film Movie 43.

Her uncle is Larry David.

== Career ==
Claire appeared in 2015 and 2016 in Devious Maids as Gail, a friend of Evelyn’s, described by one character as 'a drunk driving, verbally abusive mess.' She simultaneously played Susannah in Bloodline, a co-worker of Alec (Steven Pasquale) who makes Meg (Linda Cardellini) an offer she may not be able to refuse. Claire also guest-starred on Scandal in 2015; her role in that show actually led her to be cast in Devious Maids.

== Filmography ==
=== Film ===
| Year | Title | Role | Notes |
|---|---|---|---|
| 1998 | Sour Grapes | Matisse | |
| 2001 | All Over the Guy | Lizz | |
| 2001 | Lip Service | Manda | |
| 2005 | Bewitched | Hillary | |
| 2006 | Jam | Judy | |
| 2007 | The Grand | Dr. Jamie Sellers | |
| 2013 | Movie 43 | Pamela | Segment: "The Catch" |

=== Television ===
| Year | Title | Role | Notes |
|---|---|---|---|
| 1992–1996 | Seinfeld | Receptionist / Waitress | Recurring role |
| 1996 | Men Behaving Badly | Jenny | "Jamie's in Love" |
| 1999 | 3rd Rock from the Sun | Jenny | "Dick Solomon of the Indiana Solomons" |
| 2000 | G vs E | Alex Peters | "Renunciation" |
| 2001 | Girlfriends | Gabby | "Un-Treatable" |
| 2001 | Everybody Loves Raymond | Alexis | "Ray's Ring" |
| 2001–2004 | Grounded for Life | Lina | "Eddie's Dead", "Bang on the Drum", "Communication Breakdown" |
| 2002 | Boston Public | A.D.A. Maskell | "Chapter 44" |
| 2002 | Red Faction II | Quill (voice) | Video game |
| 2002 | Becker | Sandy | "The 100th" |
| 2002 | Less than Perfect | Receptionist | "Pilot" |
| 2003 | Just Shoot Me! | Kirsten | "The Goodbye Girl" |
| 2004 | Dr. Vegas | Joanne | "Out Damned Spot" |
| 2005 | Nadine in Date Land | Magda | TV film |
| 2005 | Entourage | Carrie Carlson | "An Offer Refused" |
| 2005 | The Inside | Tessa St. Clair | "Everything Nice" |
| 2005 | Boston Legal | Kiersten Blau | "The Ass Fat Jungle" |
| 2006 | Pepper Dennis | Janice Abruzzi | "True Love Is Dead" |
| 2006 | Day Break | Angela Rondello | "Pilot" |
| 2007 | Curb Your Enthusiasm | Iris | "The TiVo Guy" |
| 2007 | Cavemen | Addison | "Hunters & Gatherers" |
| 2007–08 | Dirt | Cheryl Steen | Recurring role |
| 2008–09 | 'Til Death | Eileen | "Circumdecision", "The Ex-Factor" |
| 2009 | Lipstick Jungle | Dr. Susan Kress | "Lovers' Leaps" |
| 2009 | NCIS | Lois Heller | "Toxic" |
| 2009–2014 | Web Therapy | Robin Griner | Recurring role |
| 2010 | Damages | Gail Sturmer | "Drive It Through Hardcore", "All That Crap About Your Family", "The Next One's Gonna Go in Your Throat" |
| 2010 | Castle | Lisa Jenkins | "Overkill" |
| 2010 | 24 | Eden Linley | Recurring role |
| 2011 | CSI: Miami | Tandy King | "Match Made in Hell" |
| 2011 | The Cape | Barbara Morgan | "Tarot" |
| 2011 | How to Make It in America | Robin | Main role (season 2) |
| 2012 | Royal Pains | Anika | "A Guesthouse Divided" |
| 2012–13 | Bunheads | Anastasia Torres | Recurring role |
| 2013 | The Mentalist | Sylvia Clare | "Behind the Red Curtain" |
| 2015 | Scandal | Francesca Hunter | "Dog-Whistle Politics" |
| 2015–16 | Bloodline | Susannah Chaffe | Recurring role |
| 2015–16 | Devious Maids | Gail Fleming | Recurring role (seasons 3–4) |
| 2016 | Shameless | Barbara Klifton | "A Yurt of One's Own" |
| 2016 | American Horror Story: Roanoke | Stephanie Holder | "Chapter 10" |
| 2017 | Bones | Sue Casey | "The Tutor in the Tussle" |
| 2024 | Based on a True Story | Monica | Episode: "Relapse" |
