= Web Therapy =

- Created by: Lisa Kudrow
- Written by: Lisa Kudrow; Don Roos
- Directed by: Don Roos
- Starring: Lisa Kudrow
- Country of origin: United States
- No. of seasons: 6
- No. of episodes: 133 (List of episodes)

Production
- Camera setup: Single camera
- Running time: ~3–15 min

Original release
- Network: LStudio.com
- Release: September 22, 2008 – December 4, 2014

Related
- Web Therapy (TV series)

Web Therapy is an improvised web series starring Lisa Kudrow as Fiona Wallice, a therapist who has conceived of a new form of therapy, the titular "web therapy". The series debuted on LStudio.com on September 22, 2008.

== Synopsis ==
Fiona Wallice is a therapist who has conceived of a new "modality" of therapy: the titular "web therapy". In her estimation, the traditional "50-minute hour" version of therapy gives people too much leeway to talk about irrelevant things. By dramatically shortening session time, she hopes to get results more quickly. Her sessions take place via webcam over the internet using Skype. They are taped in the hope of attracting investors into promoting her new technique as a worldwide therapy option.

A dark comedy, much of the humor revolves around Fiona's obvious self-interest and how it overshadows her legitimate ability to determine people's issues quickly and effectively. (For instance, in "Sibling Ribaldry," she manages to completely clarify a couple's romantic emotional issues in thirty seconds but does so only to bring them around so she can then film them discussing more trivial sexual issues that are more shocking.)

== TV series ==
In April 2010, Showtime announced plans to adapt the online episodes for broadcast on television with extra scenes being shot. The series premiered on Showtime on July 19, 2011, and ran for 10 episodes. In December 2011, Showtime renewed Web Therapy for a second season of 11 episodes, which premiered on July 2, 2012. On November 16, 2012, Web Therapy was renewed for a 10 episode third season by Showtime. On January 14, 2014, Showtime renewed Web Therapy for a fourth season, that ran for 12 episodes. On August 11, 2015, Showtime cancelled the series after four seasons.

== Awards and nominations ==
Year	Award	Category	Recipient(s)	Result
2009	Streamy Awards	Best Female Actor in a Comedy Web Series	Lisa Kudrow	Nominated
2009	Webby Award	Special Achievement: Outstanding Comedic Performance	Lisa Kudrow	Won
2009	Webby Award	Best Writing	Series	Nominated
2010	Streamy Awards	Best Female Actor in a Comedy Web Series!	Lisa Kudrow	Nominated
2010	Streamy Awards	Best Guest Star in a Web Series	Courteney Cox	Nominated
2010	Webby Award	Best Individual Performance	Lisa Kudrow	Nominated
2010	Webby Award	Best Writing	Series	Nominated
2010	Webby Award	Comedy: Long Form or Series	Series	Won
2011	Webby Award	Best Individual Performance!!!	Lisa Kudrow	Won
2011	Webby Award	Comedy: Long Form or Series	Series	Won
2011	Banff World Media Festival	Award of Excellence in Digital Media	Lisa Kudrow	Won
2012	Emmy Award	Outstanding Special Class-Short-format Live-Action Entertainment Programs	Web Therapy	Nominated

== Guest stars ==
The series has featured appearances by a number of prominent comedians and actors including Julia Louis-Dreyfus, Bob Balaban, Rashida Jones, Selma Blair, Tim Bagley, Dan Bucatinsky, Jane Lynch, Molly Shannon, Lily Tomlin, Rosie O'Donnell, Conan O'Brien, Craig Ferguson, Alan Cumming, Natasha Bedingfield, Minnie Driver, Courteney Cox and Darren Criss. Oscar-winning actress Meryl Streep guest starred in three special episodes that were made after the third series had been completed. It was announced on the show's Facebook page that guest stars for the second series will include Selma Blair, David Schwimmer and Victor Garber.

=== Lisa Kudrow's connection to guest stars ===
- Courteney Cox
  - Former main cast member on Friends and star of Cougar Town on which Lisa Kudrow guest starred and also is a good friend.
- Dan Bucatinsky
  - Production partner and former cast member on The Comeback.
- Bob Balaban
  - Guest star on Friends (he played Phoebe Buffay's father).
- Drew Sherman
  - Played the cameraman (Dan) in a The Comeback featurette.
- Alan Cumming
  - Co-star in Romy and Michele's High School Reunion.
- Meryl Streep
  - Both alumnae of Vassar College, where they both currently serve on the board of trustees.
- David Schwimmer
  - Former main cast member and director on Friends and Schwimmer is a good friend of Kudrow.
- Matt LeBlanc
  - Former main cast member on Friends and LeBlanc is a good friend of Kudrow.
- Matthew Perry
  - Former main cast member on Friends and Perry is a good friend of Kudrow.

== See also ==
- List of Web Therapy webisodes
- Cyberpsychology
- Online counseling
