= Don Roos =

American screenwriter and film director

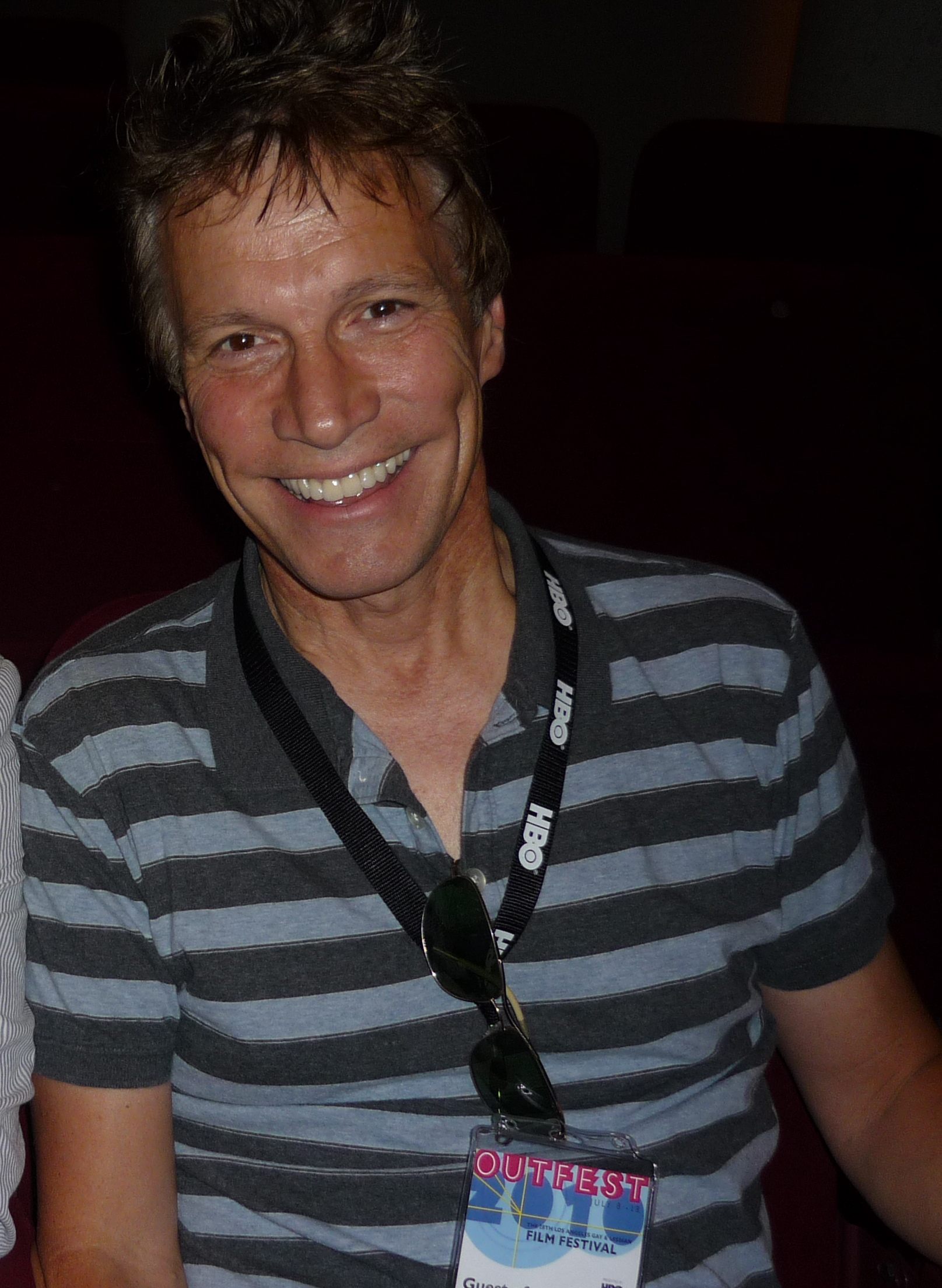
- Born: April 14, 1955 (age 71); New York City, U.S.
- Occupations: Screenwriter, director, producer
- Years active: 1979–present
- Spouse: Dan Bucatinsky (m. 2008)
- Children: 2

Donald Paul Roos (born April 14, 1955) is an American screenwriter and film director.

== Life and career ==
Roos was born in upstate New York into a conservative Roman Catholic family of mostly Irish descent. He attended the University of Notre Dame in Indiana. After graduating, Roos moved to Los Angeles, where he pursued a television screenwriting career.

Roos supported himself by working as a word processor, and to this day jokes that he has that as a fall-back plan. Roos began his writing career when he had a friend of his impersonate an agent and represent him; a phone call led to a job with playwright Mart Crowley (The Boys in the Band), who at the time was an executive producer of Hart to Hart. Roos wrote for The Colbys, Nightingales, and other TV shows, before his spec scripts led to feature film writing assignments. His first major film was 1992's Academy Award-nominated Love Field, an interracial drama starring Michelle Pfeiffer and Dennis Haysbert.

Roos's work as the writer of the film Single White Female has earned him a permanent space in Hollywood movie trivia, since that title has entered the lexicon in reference to the film's psychopathic lead character who begins to take on her roommate's identity.

Roos is well known for his work writing strong and engaging female characters, a skill that has also been useful in his film direction, leading to Independent Spirit Award nominations for actors Lisa Kudrow, Christina Ricci and Maggie Gyllenhaal. Roos himself has won a Best First Feature Independent Spirit Award, for The Opposite of Sex. Roos has polished or written the screenplay to many high-profile studio films, sometimes as uncredited script doctor.

With his husband - actor, writer, and film producer Dan Bucatinsky - he has two children, Eliza and Jonah.

== Filmography ==
Film

Year	Title	Director	Writer	Producer
1992	Single White Female	No	Yes	No
1992	Love Field	No	Yes	Co-producer
1995	Boys on the Side	No	Yes	Executive
1996	Diabolique	No	Yes	No
1998	The Opposite of Sex	Yes	Yes	No
2000	Bounce	Yes	Yes	No
2005	Happy Endings	Yes	Yes	No
2008	Marley & Me	No	Yes	No
2009	The Other Woman	Yes	Yes	No
2018	The Guernsey Literary and Potato Peel Pie Society	No	Yes	No

Television

Year	Title	Director	Writer	Producer	Creator	Notes
1989	Nightingales	No	Yes	Yes	No	Wrote 2 episodes
2000	M.Y.O.B.	Yes	Yes	Executive	Yes	Directed 2 episodes
2008–2014	Web Therapy	Yes	Yes	No	Yes	Directed 131 episodes
2010	Who Do You Think You Are?	No	No	Executive	No	7 episodes
2011–2015	Web Therapy	Yes	Yes	No	Yes	All 44 episodes
2017	Doubt	No	Yes	Consulting	No	Episode "Faith"
2017–2018	This Is Us	No	Yes	Co-executive	No	Episodes "The 20's" and "That'll Be the Day"
2017–2021	Younger	No	Yes	Co-executive	No	7 episodes
2020	Council of Dads	No	No	Consulting	No	5 episodes
2020	Emily in Paris	No	No	Consulting	No	4 episodes
2022	Uncoupled	No	Yes	Co-executive	No	Episode "Chapter 5"
