= List of Longmire episodes =

Longmire is a crime drama series that premiered on A&E Network on June 3, 2012, before moving to Netflix in 2015 and completing its run on November 17, 2017. The series was based on the Longmire mystery novels written by best-selling author Craig Johnson, and follows Walt Longmire (Robert Taylor), the sheriff of the fictional Absaroka County, Wyoming, as he returns to work following the death of his wife.

During the course of the series, 63 episodes of Longmire were released over six seasons.

== Series overview ==
Season	Episodes	Originally released		
Season	Episodes	First released	Last released	Network
1	10	June 3, 2012	August 12, 2012	A&E
2	13	May 27, 2013	August 26, 2013	A&E
3	10	June 2, 2014	August 4, 2014	A&E
4	10	September 10, 2015		Netflix
5	10	September 23, 2016		Netflix
6	10	November 17, 2017		Netflix

== Episodes ==
=== Season 1 (2012) ===
No. overall	No. in season	Title	Directed by	Written by	Original release date	US viewers (millions)
1	1	"Pilot"	Christopher Chulack	John Coveny & Hunt Baldwin	June 3, 2012	4.15
Sheriff Walt Longmire has mourned the death of his wife for a year. He has delegated most police duties to deputies Branch Connaly (Bailey Chase) and Archie "The Ferg" Ferguson (Adam Bartley). Longmire's adult daughter Cady (Cassidy Freeman) is concerned about her father. Victoria "Vic" Moretti (Katee Sackhoff) is a transplanted Philadelphia homicide detective who arrived in Wyoming six months prior and is now one of Walt's deputies, and Walt’s longtime friend Henry Standing Bear (Lou Diamond Phillips) assists with any dealings with the local Indian reservation. The sheriff's office investigates a murder linked to a missing Indian girl and a mobile brothel. In the episode's opening scenes, Walt can be seen taking a shower. Scars are evident on his back. He approaches a wooden tea box in the kitchen, but opts for coffee. At the end of the episode, Walt can be seen with the box by his side. His wife's ashes are contained within.
2	2	"The Dark Road"	Michael Uppendahl	Sarah Nicole Jones	June 10, 2012	4.10
A beautiful young woman's body is found on the outskirts of Absaroka County. The only clues to her mysterious death are single dollar bills scattered nearby and her body glitter. Walt and Vic surmise that the victim was an exotic dancer. In the victim's pocket, they find a drawing of a tree with unrecognizable writing underneath it. The investigation uncovers that the woman was a Mennonite. The victim's brother had accidentally killed her while trying to urge her back into the Mennonite community. Outside the investigation, Walt deduces that Cady is secretly dating someone, unaware that that particular someone is Branch. Flashbacks: Walt has his back stitched up, with Henry in attendance, and cautions him not to tell Cady about it.
3	3	"A Damn Shame"	Christopher Chulack	Hunt Baldwin & John Coveny	June 17, 2012	3.52
A tragic barn fire originally appears as suicide attempt to the sheriff's office, but further investigation reveals the victim faked his own death. The barn owner was hiding from the mob. This news disrupts the department as Walt is the only one who knows the case's background. The Ferg mistakenly leads the mob to the farmer's family and later turns in his badge to Walt, who refuses to take it.
4	4	"The Cancer"	Gwyneth Horder-Payton	Daniel C. Connolly	June 24, 2012	3.78
A fisherman discovers two bodies wrapped and tied together in the river. The sheriff's office investigates and learns that one victim was a local Cheyenne boy and the other was a member of a Mexican drug cartel. The cartel was growing marijuana on reservation land, but Walt discovers that, in this case, a park ranger had been growing the marijuana, having gotten it while serving in Afghanistan. The ranger shot the cartel member, who had shot the Cheyenne boy. He then disposed of the bodies in such a way as to make it appear as if the cartel killed both victims. A second cartel member attacks, but Walt and the ranger dispatch him before the ranger is arrested for his crimes. It is also revealed that Walt's wife had earlier died of cancer.
5	5	"Dog Soldier"	Alex Graves	Tony Tost	July 1, 2012	3.27
This episode is based on actual events. Walt investigates the disappearance of a Cheyenne boy from his foster home. Two other boys go missing from a group home. All the boys turn up at Henry's bar. One of the boys tells Walt they were taken by a "dog soldier" with a scar under one eye. Walt believes the children are describing Hector, a Cheyenne enforcer. Walt confronts the child services manager. Flashbacks: Walt receives a letter from the Denver Police Department and is seen driving on a rainy night on a highway. Later, he again looks at the envelope and, with an unscarred back, stares at himself in a mirror in a motel bathroom. He puts his sheriff's badge in a safe and tucks a gun into the back of his jeans. In the present, he burns the Denver Police Department letter.
6	6	"The Worst Kind of Hunter"	Peter Weller	Hunt Baldwin & John Coveny	July 8, 2012	4.06
While investigating a bear attack that killed a convicted murderer who was granted early parole due to prison overcrowding, Walt finds evidence that someone baited the bear into attacking the victim. Walt eventually deduces that the person responsible was the former prison warden, who was seeking revenge for both the initial murder and the later murder of one of his deputies. Meanwhile, Branch's uncle Lucian Connally (Peter Weller), the retired former Sheriff, lands in jail after firing a shotgun in his retirement home, and obliquely aids in the case. Walt finds himself calling in favors to make the home readmit Lucian. It is also revealed that Vic is unhappily married, a secret to most people despite Vic's six months' residence in the county. Flashbacks: Walt kicks in the door to a meth house, gun drawn.
7	7	"8 Seconds"	Christopher Chulack	Tony Tost	July 15, 2012	4.45
Chris Sublette is found beaten unconscious at his house; one of his paintings has been stolen. Investigations uncover that both Sublette and his wife were cheating on each other. A rodeo veterinarian is thought to be cheating with Mrs. Sublette, and his entire family is questioned when their vehicle is spotted after the painting is recovered. The man's wife admits to asking her son to follow him to Sublette's house. The son expected to see his father with Mrs. Sublette, but attacked Chris when he saw him having sex with his father. Barlow Connally (Gerald McRaney) learns that Walt had been drunk at the crime scene and asks Branch to use that against him in the election. Branch refuses, saying that Walt was technically off duty at the time and nevertheless solved the crime and recovered the painting.
8	8	"An Incredibly Beautiful Thing"	J. Michael Muro	Daniel C. Connolly	July 22, 2012	4.54
Walt finds a store owner's dead body after being called about a disheveled woman arriving there. Finding a hidden camera in the store, Walt finds that the store owner had written a partial license plate number. They give a screen capture of the woman to the press. The woman's parents arrive at Walt's office to say she had disappeared a few years ago. Henry and Ferg track the woman from the store and discover an abandoned baby. Walt stakes out where the baby was found and captures another woman who reveals that she and the missing woman belong to a cult. The license plate number is tracked to a drilling site in the next county where the cult's leader works. The team arrive at the man's house to find him surrounded by a dozen empty beds. He confesses to killing the store owner because the man "was going to take her from them". During transport, he talks in code, which Longmire translates to learn the cult has been left in the path of an oncoming train to be killed should their accompanying poison not work. The train is stopped and the women are saved by Walt and his team. Flashbacks: When Walt asks Henry about his tracking skills, Henry flashes back to when he followed Walt to Denver, Colorado.
9	9	"Dogs, Horses, and Indians"	Steve Robin	Sarah Nicole Jones	August 5, 2012	3.96
The president of the local Cheyenne nation is found shot to death in his car just off the reservation. The man had planned legislation to limit certain heritage percentages within the nation, in order for an increased share of the future casino's profits. An even bigger cover-up is discovered when the murderer claims he committed the crime on reservation land. The body had been later moved by someone else. Meanwhile, Walt finally learns that his daughter Cady and Branch had recently dated. This does not dissuade Branch from pursuing the election. Flashbacks: Walt is seen leaving the Denver police department and fighting in the meth house.
10	10	"Unfinished Business"	Nelson McCormick	Hunt Baldwin & John Coveny	August 12, 2012	4.34
Two teenaged boys, out of four previously found not guilty in a sexual assault trial, are found dead from being shot with arrows. A symbol is drawn on both victims. Another boy's father confesses to the murders but cannot draw the symbol when asked. Walt suspects the father is protecting the son, the actual murderer. He finds the teen prepared to shoot the remaining boy. While confessing to the two murders, the boy admits to being forced to commit the previous sexual assault at gunpoint by the remaining teen. Both are arrested for their respective crimes. Meanwhile, Detective Fales (Charles S. Dutton) from Denver gets the runaround from Walt and talks to Cady about her mother's death. Cady is shocked to learn her mother was murdered, as Walt had told her she died of cancer. She is furious with Walt, who was only trying to protect her inner peace, even if it damages his relationship with her. Walt and Fales finally talk. Fales says they found the man suspected of killing Walt's wife buried in a shallow grave. When Fales asks whether Walt traveled to Denver and killed the man, he replies simply, "No".

=== Season 2 (2013) ===
No. overall	No. in season	Title	Directed by	Written by	Original release date	US viewers (millions)
11	1	"Unquiet Mind"	Michael Offer	Hunt Baldwin & John Coveny	May 27, 2013	4.31
In preparing for a transport, serial killer Wayne Durell (Dan Hildebrand) and other prisoners escape the FBI into the mountains of Absaroka County. Before his arrest, Durell had murdered at least eight Native Americans, one of whom is a young boy Walt promised to find, to harvest their organs and sell on the black market. Walt decides to track Durell on foot in a snowstorm. In town, Vic tangles with the FBI agent in charge (Noam Jenkins), who seems to not care about Walt's welfare. Vic punches the FBI agent and gets banned from the station. Meanwhile, Branch and Henry set out on horseback after Walt. During the pursuit, Walt has hallucinations of several people helping him in their own ways — the young murder victim, Henry, Cady and Detective Fales. He eventually finds Durell thanks to a blood trail that leads to an abandoned mine shaft and a crate full of Durell's black market profits. Longmire and Durell fight until they are totally exhausted. Branch and Henry arrive and find Durell dead on the ground and Walt nearby, sitting motionless against a tree stump. Branch asks Henry if Walt is dead, but Walt slowly raises his head and says, "Not yet."
12	2	"Carcasses"	Lodge Kerrigan	Tony Tost	June 3, 2013	3.75
Holly Whitish (Heather Kafka) finds a dead man's (Patrick Robert Smith) body in her compost pile. The coroner's report shows he ate turducken before he died, leading Walt and his team to a truck stop on the county line. There, they uncover a prostitution ring, and prostitute Delila (Allie MacDonald) tells Walt that the dead man smelled of tar. A local road crew foreman (Chris Ranney) identifies the man as Ross Lanton. Walt and Vic go to Lanton's residence and find Ross Lanton's truck but no one is home. They visit the neighbors and talk to them about Lanton and discover Lanton's wife had filed for divorce and moved back to North Carolina after Greg, the neighbors husband, followed Lanton to the county line truckstop and records video of Ross hiring a prostitute. Greg has a black eye which matches the defensive wounds on Lanton's hands. Meanwhile, after seeing Cady's mail piled up and having no contact with her, Branch visits Henry's bar to ask if he has heard from her, which he hasn't. A drunken Holly appears and admits to knowing Lanton. She has a breakdown and drags a deer carcass into the bar. She tells Walt that Lanton raped her 20 years ago and God has answered her prayers to kill him. After Delila's pimp is arrested, she describes the car that Lanton got into the night he died. Ferg finds the weapon that killed Lanton at Holly's place. On a hunch, Walt questions Holly's 20-year-old son (Devon Graye), who drives a car like the one described. In front of his mother, the son admits to learning Lanton was his father, getting a job to work with him, and killing him when he sees that he still has no respect for women. Finally, Walt calls Cady, but her phone is at her house while she arrives in Denver and asks to speak to Detective Fales.
13	3	"Death Came in Like Thunder"	Gwyneth Horder-Payton	Sarah Nicole Jones	June 10, 2013	3.57
Basque shepherd Marco Vayas is found dead on his woodland property. He had been poisoned by hemlock that Walt finds in a well. Marco's brothers learn that he was about to sell his land to a lumber company that Jacob Nighthorse (A Martinez) represents. Walt and Vic find one of the Vayas brothers trying to get information from his wife by forcing her head into the water in a well. Walt must sort out who poisoned Marco. He dupes the wife into thinking that hemlock was also in that well and insists she tell him the truth before he can take her for medical attention. She confesses to the murder, planned because she thought Marco was going to sell his property, resulting in less income for the family. Meanwhile in Denver, Cady learns from Fales the details about how her mother was murdered and that the killer was also killed. When asked how Walt has dealt with his wife's death, she mentions that Walt might confide in Henry. Walt receives a call that Henry is now on Fales' list. Henry implies to Walt that he killed the murderer because Walt was unable. They share a drink as a silent vow to protect Henry's secret, as well as Walt's original intent.
14	4	"The Road to Hell"	Daniel Sackheim	Daniel C. Connolly	June 17, 2013	3.32
A highway patrolman finds a shot-up tractor-trailer rig; its cattle trailer and driver, Cooper James (Stephen Sullivan), are missing. R.J. Watts (William Earl Brown), a detective with the livestock bureau, is called in. Later that night, a bound James strolls up to Walt at a roadside checkpoint. He tells Walt and Watts that he was assaulted by four masked men with automatic weapons, his trailer was hijacked, and he was released later. Watts suspects a cattle rustler, Bobby Dunwood, organized the heist, but the fact that Dunwood is still in prison presents a pretty solid alibi. Vic drops James off at his car at the truck depot, but learns he never made it home. She and Walt find him dead, hanging in a trailer parked at the depot the next morning. Soon, some of the missing cattle stroll into town bearing animal rights activism signs, but Watts thinks it's a red herring. While discussing past cases with Watts, Walt hears that most of the people Watts has arrested are now out of jail, and Dunwood will soon join the ranks. Watts arranges an early furlough for Dunwood so he and Walt can follow him. But it turns out, the cattle owner's son (Matt Angel) and his college activist girlfriend are responsible for the livestock theft. Walt tells Watts to end Dunwood's furlough and return him to prison, but Watts has other plans. He discovered James was in on the cattle theft and killed him, and he decides to end his own life and tries to take Dunwood with him by crashing his car. Meanwhile, Vic receives a mysterious bouquet of flowers at work. A card reads "Happy Anniversary," but her wedding anniversary is months away. At home, she tells her husband: "They found me."
15	5	"Party's Over"	Peter Weller	Hunt Baldwin & John Coveny	June 24, 2013	3.21
Teenager Tanya Dove is found shot dead in an alley stairwell. Vic searches the girl's body to find a house key and a partial pill. This sets Walt's team off on an investigation into prescription drug theft, which leads them to a pharmacist who had supplied a list of hydrocodone buyers to a group of thugs. The mother of Dove's boyfriend, Barbara Bollman (Gabrielle Carteris), is on the list. Walt goes to their house and tests the key, which unlocks the door. He finds evidence of a recent shooting and prepares to take the boyfriend in for questioning. The mother then confesses to shooting Dove after thinking she was a burglar when the girl had attempted to steal Barbara's pills. Meanwhile, Cady returns home. She is not forthcoming with Walt nor Branch about why she left, but she does mention being in Denver to both. She tells Walt that he was correct about how she would feel, once she knew the truth about her mother's death.
16	6	"Tell It Slant"	J. Michael Muro	Tony Tost	July 1, 2013	3.49
After Aaron Two Rivers (Gary Farmer), a self-proclaimed Cheyenne contrary warrior, rides backwards on a horse past Walt's house with a cryptic message for the Sheriff, Walt expects to find a dead body. Soon his team stumbles across two: the remains of a Cheyenne grave on Barlow Connally's golf course development, and the murder of the town psychic, "Cassandra." As Branch struggles to keep the peace between his father Barlow and secret campaign financer, Jacob Nighthorse, Walt discovers "Cassandra" is none other than Cynthia Two Rivers, Aaron's sister. It seems Cassandra's clients have been duped by the "Psychic," who tapes her sessions and does extensive research and background checks on her clients to glean information about them. As Vic uncovers Cassandra's secrets, Walt and Branch face off in an election debate, but are soon interrupted by a drunk Aaron Two Rivers. Eventually Walt realizes he must play Aaron's game of contrary statements and role reversal in order to get Aaron to confess to his sister's murder. Although Aaron was the true psychic with "thunder dreams," his sister was the only person who believed him, and when she threatened to cut him off financially and called him a paranoid schizophrenic, Aaron snapped. At the psychic's residence, Vic finds a box with "Longmire" written on it and gives it to Walt. He opens it with Cady to find a tape of Martha Longmire's visit to Cassandra, who tells Martha that she will not die from terminal cancer. When Martha asks what will become of Walt, Cady turns off the tape before the answer is given.
17	7	"Sound and Fury"	James Hayman	Daniel C. Connolly	July 8, 2013	3.55
At the Red Pony, Henry overhears Bill Norquist (Rhys Coiro) discussing plans to have his wife Diane (Andrea Roth) killed. Henry offers to kill her, hoping to prevent it by telling Walt. Norquist is questioned but denies it. While Walt and Branch keep an eye on Diane, a South Dakota detective calls, saying Bill has been found dead in a boxcar at a train yard. A graffiti zipper is found painted in the boxcar, and then on a building nearby Bill's workplace in Durant. Henry gets a mysterious call saying Norquist was killed because he reneged on the contract to kill Diane, and Henry is the next target for going to the police. He is later taken hostage by Zip, a gutter punk, who's discovered people pay more to save their own lives than to have someone killed. Zip coerces Henry into giving him a ride out of town, but Walt arrives and rescues Henry by shooting Zip. Meanwhile, Vic has an unnerving encounter with Ed Gorski (Lee Tergesen), a retired cop who Vic used to work with in Philadelphia. He claims to be on a road trip with his wife and just had to see what she was up to. He invites her to have a drink with him and she reluctantly accepts. They discuss another Philadelphia cop's suicide and the subsequent internal affairs investigation. Gorski claims he wants to make amends with Vic for the way he treated her during the investigation, but Vic isn't so sure. She later calls the campground where he claimed he was staying and is told no one matching Gorski is registered there. Initially she suspects Gorski is behind Bill Norquist's death, but after the real killer is revealed, she worries about the true reason for Gorski's visit.
18	8	"The Great Spirit"	Christopher Chulack	Sarah Nicole Jones	July 15, 2013	3.39
Migrant farm foreman Titus Griffin has been killed, shot through the neck and dragged behind a wild rodeo horse. Titus had staged the rodeo in order to improve the morale of Beltro Farms's workers, who were illegal immigrants. The company had bought up local farms and promised the illegals a new life in the United States, when it actually separated their families and forced them to work without documentation. Cal Weston's (Jay Paulson) family property was one of the farms that was bought. Titus had moved into the Weston farm house. Cal chose to work with Beltro, but was never made foreman. Titus gave all the proceeds from the rodeo to the illegals and none to Cal, who shot him in retaliation and tied him to the horse. Meanwhile, Detective Fales visits Henry to ask why he went twice to Denver as Walt had, following his wife's death. Henry claims it was to visit an elderly friend, Ada Black Kettle (Francine Williams). In actuality, Walt, bleeding from his back, had shown up at Henry's motel room door. Henry took Walt to Ada, who stitched him up. After Fales's visit, Henry goes to Ada to warn her that Fales may visit her. She comforts him, by reminding him of the legend of the Great Spirit and the First Warrior. He recalls it as the Warrior thanking the Great Spirit for blessing him, but is told that payment should be him fighting for the "brothers" he finds in life. As Henry tells the legend, Walt attempts to set the wild horse free, but the horse returns to him.
19	9	"Tuscan Red"	Michael Rymer	Tony Tost	July 29, 2013	3.51
Ethan Lone Elk's body is found in his brother Dolan's (Eric Schweig) burned-out home on the Cheyenne reservation. The town's medical examiner (Kenneth Choi) informs Walt and Vic that Ethan died from alcohol poisoning and had been covered with red paint. Dolan tells them Ethan was employed at Jacob Nighthorse's casino. His wife Lauren (Sharon Brathwaite-Sanders) also works at the casino. Walt and Vic go there, expecting to talk to the Cheyenne wife, but discover she is African-American. Lauren explains that Ethan being a human resource manager and married to a non-Cheyenne woman caused a lot of stress for them. She adds that Ethan never drank alcohol. Walt talks to Dolan's neighbor, Grady Littlefoot (Raoul Trujillo), who had failed Ethan's pre-employment drug test and recently painted his car red. Walt suggests Grady forced Ethan to drink excessively, put his body in Dolan's home, and torched it. Grady claims he did it out of spite, because Ethan seemed to forget his heritage. Meanwhile, Cady tells Branch that she is not emotionally ready to be in a relationship. However, after both get drunk at the Red Pony and spend the night together, she soberingly tells him why — her father and boyfriend were in an election debate and her mother had been murdered. Branch tells Walt that he knows about the murder and Walt's involvement. Out of concern for Cady, Branch will not use the information to help himself in the election.
20	10	"Election Day"	J. Michael Muro	Hunt Baldwin & John Coveny	August 5, 2013	3.86
On Election Day, Vic arrives at the scene of a car accident to find Cady critically injured. She had been hit while fixing a flat tire on a car at the side of a road. The other car is abandoned. The investigation leads Walt to Bob Barnes's (John Bishop) trailer, where he arrests Bob's son Billy (Arron Shiver) who was also injured in the accident. Billy confesses to texting while driving intoxicated and accidentally hitting Cady. Bob pleads for Walt to arrest him instead of his son, who was coming to the Red Pony to pick up his drunk father. After losing the election, Branch checks out the car that Cady was tending. He learns the flat tire had a puncture of unknown origin, but on the side and not in the tread. Walt asks Henry to prepare a Sun Dance ceremony for him, because their actions in Denver must be answered and made right. Henry obliges.
21	11	"Natural Order"	Daniel Sackheim	Sarah Nicole Jones	August 12, 2013	3.60
As Walt completes his ceremony, Cady regains consciousness in the hospital. Walt and Vic investigate the death of game warden Connor Redding, found stabbed to death near a decapitated and eviscerated elk corpse. Omar (Louis Herthum) studies the elk and suggests it was harvested to make velvetine, which is used from medicinal purposes. At first, a global poaching ring is suspected, but Walt discovers local taxidermist Lee Rosky (Jim Beaver) killed Connor, who caught Lee poaching. Rosky's wife was in the last stages of cancer and her traditional medicines were not helping. Meanwhile, after being reassured by Henry that Walt does not hold grudges, Branch decides not to quit his job. He continues looking over the car that Cady was injured while fixing its flat tire. He finds a fingerprint near the tire. The puncture was deliberately done by someone employed by Jacob Nighthorse, who, when confronted with this information, tells Branch that he needs to let go of the past and look to the future.
22	12	"A Good Death is Hard to Find"	Kari Skogland	Tony Tost	August 19, 2013	4.12
A safe deposit box gets delivered to the office. Inside it is a severed finger. Branch tells Walt that the bank was instructed to deliver the box to the sheriff upon the death of its owner, James Notley, arrested for armed robbery in 1989 by Branch's uncle Lucian. Notley had been stabbed to death in prison two weeks before his release. Prison records show that only two people had visited before his death — his girlfriend Connie Mallery (Robyn Lively) and Lucian. Lucian explains Notley's 1989 robbery of valuable dinosaur bones, and that Notley had all his fingers when he last saw him. Hank (Cory Tucker), a prison guard, finds a note in Notley's cell, implicating Riley Manning (Brad Carter), his partner to whom the finger actually belongs. Manning admits to cutting off his own finger to prove his loyalty to Notley, but adds that the note was probably a setup from Connie. Walt finds Connie at home with Hank and both suggest the other's involvement in Notley's death. Connie pretended to be fearful of Notley's release and Hank had him killed. Meanwhile, Vic finds evidence which leads her to believe Ed Gorski is stalking her. She tells Walt about reporting Gorski's partner Bobby for corruption, triggering an investigation that led Bobby to commit suicide. Gorski blamed Vic for Bobby's death. He began stalking her at work, which she couldn't prove, so she moved to Wyoming with her husband to protect herself. Henry later tells Walt that Vic asked about hiring a mercenary named Hector to scare someone. Walt visits Ed at his motel room and tells him the story of Achilles seeking revenge on a friend's enemy in the Iliad. Ed asks how the enemy could've prevented it and Walt suggests by leaving town.
23	13	"Bad Medicine"	Michael Offer	Hunt Baldwin & John Coveny	August 26, 2013	4.42
Ed Gorski is hospitalized after being severely beaten. He accuses Walt, after the recent Achilles threat. Vic hopes to appease him by asking him to name her as his assailant. To save Vic's career, Walt convinces Hector to turn himself in for the assault. Because Detective Fales and his team arrive in town with search warrants, Walt drives Hector to the neighboring county. Henry intercepts him, telling Walt he had hired Hector to kill Miller Beck, the man who murdered Walt's wife. Hector, however, claims he merely assaulted Beck and took his teeth, which he gave to Henry. Those teeth are found at the Red Pony and Henry is arrested. Walt suspects someone else killed Beck, possibly the person who hired him to kill Walt's wife. Meanwhile, Gorski checks out of the hospital without pressing charges but leaves Vic another threatening note. She tells Walt that Gorski has left town, but she sits at home, armed and staring at the door. On the reservation, Branch goes to investigate David Ridges for sabotaging Cady's car on election day. He learns Ridges has committed suicide and Jacob Nighthorse burned the body in a ceremony. Nighthorse warns Branch not to collect samples to confirm it is Ridges, as the pyre is on sacred ground. Branch attempts to collect anyway and gets shot by someone he describes to Walt as a "dead man," remembering someone approaching him wearing a Dog Soldier head-dress and their body coated in ash.

=== Season 3 (2014) ===
No. overall	No. in season	Title	Directed by	Written by	Original release date	US viewers (millions)
24	1	"The White Warrior"	Christopher Chulack	Hunt Baldwin & John Coveny	June 2, 2014	3.86
After stitching Branch up with fishing wire, Walt drops him off at the reservation clinic. He then forces Mathias, who is transporting Henry to Denver, to pull over. Henry has refused his rights and intends to take the blame for Miller Beck's death. Walt vows to get Henry a lawyer. Back at the station, Vic confronts Walt, who explains about his wife's death and Branch being shot. A peyote-laced crow feather is pulled from Branch's wound. Walt believes it caused Branch to hallucinate seeing a dead David Ridges attack him. However, Branch stands firm in his decision, even after Walt runs a DNA test on the ashes Branch collected, which proves the ashes belong to Ridges. Meanwhile, Walt sends Vic to pick up Hector, Henry's only witness, at a neighboring county sheriff's office. She arrives to learn Hector has escaped.
25	2	"Of Children and Travelers"	J. Michael Muro	Tony Tost	June 9, 2014	3.60
Walt and Vic investigate the murder of Polina, a young Russian teen whose adoptive parents traded her away to a couple they met online. This exposes a network of child trafficking, leading Vic and Walt to pose as parents of a troubled child. They learn Polina was simply trying to protect her younger adopted sister and was killed for it. Meanwhile, Branch returns to work but remains fixated on who shot him. Henry gets abused in prison by fellow natives, led by former reservation sheriff Malachi (Graham Greene), for his friendship with Walt. Malachi wants Walt to vouch for him at his upcoming parole hearing, in exchange for Henry's future welfare. Cady becomes Henry's public defender after firing the inept one assigned to his case.
26	3	"Miss Cheyenne"	James Hayman	Sarah Nicole Jones	June 16, 2014	3.58
While Walt fills in for Henry as a judge in the Miss Cheyenne Nation contest, Vic asks his help with the murder of a doctor found stabbed to death in a barn. Walt questions the doctor's father to learn his other son was also killed. Both sons died in the same manner. The team investigates the father to discover he used sterilization techniques on Cheyenne women, under the guise of routine surgeries. One of those women was a contest judge who sought revenge for her sterilization by killing the sons. Meanwhile, Cady and Henry attend his bail hearing, even though she is not a trial lawyer; the judge admits that he will almost never allow bail on a murder charge but gives her two days to plan her plea. She must ask the Cheyenne people to vouch for Henry and finds a mother who Henry helped two years ago. Her testimony about Henry causes the judge to grant the bail, albeit a million dollars. Branch writes a check for $100,000 for the bail bond, out of respect for Cady. After the bail is arranged, Walt meets Henry at the prison gate, vowing to not have him return there.
27	4	"In the Pines"	Gwyneth Horder-Payton	Hunt Baldwin & John Coveny	June 23, 2014	3.51
The team investigates the suffocating death of a wilderness guide. Meanwhile, Vic's husband, Sean, shows Walt a picture given to him of her and Walt entering a motel room together. What bothers Sean the most about it was Ed Gorski sent it with a strange number written on the back. Vic tells Walt that the number was that of Ed's Philadelphia apartment in which they used to have sex. Elsewhere, Branch conducts an experiment by clipping his hair and dripping his blood on an animal carcass and setting it on fire. His DNA from the ashes proves David Ridges could've done the same, is still alive, and assaulted him. Branch abducts a peyote dealer from the reservation for future questioning. Also, Walt posts pictures on his office wall of all the people who might harbor a grudge enough to have killed his wife.
28	5	"Wanted Man"	Peter Weller	Tony Tost	June 30, 2014	3.23
With only a reported stolen chicken to investigate, Walt puts Vic in charge while he enlists Lucian's help in sorting out the suspects list in his wife's case. Meanwhile, Branch and his friend question the peyote dealer and release him on the reservation. The abduction is reported, and Vic questions Branch's friend, who mentions Branch's name. All three cases merge when the chicken thief is revealed to be the missing Hector. He is found scalped and shot. Before he dies, he identifies his attacker when Branch shows him David Ridges' picture. Also, even though Walt testifies against Malachi at his parole hearing, he is released and makes his presence known to Henry, as it is revealed that Henry assisted Walt in Malachi's arrest.
29	6	"Reports of My Death"	Christopher Chulack	Sarah Nicole Jones	July 7, 2014	3.38
Walt investigates the death of a vagrant who has identification belonging to Welles Van Blarcom, heir to a family fortune. The man's family hasn't seen him in 30 years. Another man (Parker Stevenson) walks into the sheriff's office and claims that he is the missing heir. Walt and Ferg must sort out who is who amidst a media frenzy, as well as why Welles left his family. Meanwhile, Vic accompanies Branch into the wilderness to stake out a cave in which David Ridges might be hiding. They also discuss Branch's questioning of the peyote dealer. Henry jumps bail to spy on his girlfriend, Deena, learning she is being blackmailed by Malachi to protect him. Cady wonders if this ties into her mother's murder.
30	7	"Population 25"	Michael Offer	Hunt Baldwin & John Coveny	July 14, 2014	3.58
Vic and husband Sean take a romantic drive to Wyoming, when a bear in the road causes them to crash. She goes to get help, and both are abducted by survivalists led by Chance Gilbert (Peter Stormare), who holds a grudge against Walt for killing his brother years ago. Vic and Sean are tortured, and it is revealed she cares more for Walt than him. Meanwhile, Ed Gorski ultimately helps Walt find and rescue them; during this time, Gilbert denies involvement in the murder of Walt's wife before he and Walt engage in a duel. Gorski apparently abandons his pursuit of Vic for good as a result of the events. Meanwhile, Branch looks for clues in Vic and Sean's house, and finds the letter that Vic had composed about his behavior, intended for Walt.
31	8	"Harvest"	J. Michael Muro	Tony Tost	July 21, 2014	3.33
Ferg calls Walt from a prison detail when a severed foot is found on a roadside. Walt has the crew to search for the rest of the body, and a farmer, missing a foot, is found shot to death in a nearby barn. One of the crew is Bob Barnes, the man who took credit for hitting Cady and who is a few weeks away from release. The victim's death, his life insurance policy, and the owner of the farm are investigated. Walt confronts the life insurance agent who relates that the farmer committed suicide; the agent (a close friend) agreed to shoot him in the back to prevent the insurance company from invalidating the claim due to suicide; sympathetic, Walt agrees to rule the death as an unsolved homicide. Meanwhile, Sean tells Vic to resign her job to save their marriage. The choice becomes even more difficult, once Branch admits to breaking into her home and reading a computer document she wrote to Walt about his irrational and illegal acts. Branch accompanies Cady to a Denver bar, where he is convinced that he Ridges was also there; she returns home on realizing that he is only interested in finding David Ridges. She relates the trip to Vic, who then prints the letter about Branch to give to Walt.
32	9	"Counting Coup"	T. J. Scott	Sarah Nicole Jones	July 28, 2014	3.43
David Ridges and Branch face off, but Branch is unable to successfully shoot him. Ridges escapes but leaves behind his car and cell phone. Since no one believes him at the office, Branch attacks Vic when he realizes she told Walt about him kidnapping Sam Poteet. He is jailed until his father, Barlow, collects him and tries to calm him down at home, but Branch later escapes. Walt arrests Nighthorse when Ridges' phone shows they were in contact over the past several weeks. Nighthorse makes a deal with Walt by promising to tell him Ridges' location the next time the latter contacts him in return for Walt not charging him for false statements about the sabotage to Cady's car. Walt releases Nighthorse who later advises him of Ridges' location. Branch also finds out and heads to that location, but Walt arrives first. Ridges, dressed as a dog soldier, attacks Walt, who fatally stabs him. Meanwhile, Henry sets fire to the bar to get information out of Malachi but discovers that Darius was in another state when Beck was murdered, destroying Henry's only potential defense. Also, Vic is served divorce papers.
33	10	"Ashes to Ashes"	Michael Offer	Hunt Baldwin & John Coveny	August 4, 2014	3.68
Walt stops to give a stranded Branch a ride, after showing him Ridges' body in the back of his truck. They take it to a coroner, and Branch is then suspended. He is asked by Barlow to work in the family business. Branch agrees, but, suspicious, looks into the company's dealing with Nighthorse. Meanwhile, Cady learns that Detective Fales' initial search warrant for the Red Pony was for feathers, which Ridges has been known to leave in his victims. Walt and Henry dig up Miller Beck's body to find a feather in the throat of Walt's wife's killer. This evidence, along with Ridges' DNA under Beck's fingernails and Beck's hair found in Ridges' car, exonerates Henry. However, after Walt scatters his wife's ashes, he prepares to go after Nighthorse, believing him to still be involved. While trap shooting, Branch and Barlow discuss Nighthorse. Barlow admits to paying him to send Ridges to Denver the week that Walt's wife was killed, in the pursuit of having Branch replace Walt as sheriff. Branch expresses grim disapproval and holds his shotgun at the ready. Barlow distracts Branch and readies his own gun, then a gunshot is heard by Walt.

=== Season 4 (2015) ===
No. overall	No. in season	Title	Directed by	Written by	Original release date
34	1	"Down by the River"	Christopher Chulack	Hunt Baldwin & John Coveny	September 10, 2015
Branch's apparent suicide over his past actions shocks the sheriff's department, as Walt begins investigating Jacob Nighthorse's involvement in the death of Walt's wife. Henry discovers that he no longer owns the Red Pony bar.
35	2	"War Eagle"	T. J. Scott	Tony Tost	September 10, 2015
Walt deputizes Henry to assist in investigating Branch's death, now believed to be suspicious. Vic, Walt and Ferg look into the death of the caretaker of a former Japanese internment camp. Henry takes up Hector's role of avenger.
36	3	"High Noon"	Christopher Chulack	Hunt Baldwin & John Coveny	September 10, 2015
Cady gets a lucrative offer to work at a local corporate law firm, but quits upon learning the firm represents Nighthorse's companies that are suing Barlow Connally. Walt helps a drunken Barlow home after he wrecks his car. However, upon looking around the property, Walt realizes Barlow may have killed his own son and tried to frame Walt for stalking Nighthorse. A confrontation leads to Barlow's demise.
37	4	"Four Arrows"	Peter Weller	Sheri Holman	September 10, 2015
A murder occurs with the opening of the casino, causing Walt to apologize to Nighthorse, for believing he was involved in the deaths of both Walt's wife and Branch, in order to get his help. Lucian Connally, being in town to play at the casino, also helps to solve the case.
38	5	"Help Wanted"	J. Michael Muro	Tony Tost	September 10, 2015
Two armed robberies are connected to war veterans and their treatment at home. Walt interviews deputy candidates, based on their responses as to how to prevent the ending of Of Mice and Men.
39	6	"The Calling Back"	T. J. Scott	Boo Killebrew	September 10, 2015
The investigation into local oil workers raping a young native woman, named Gabriella, is stonewalled by her mother. Ferg has difficulty adjusting to Zachary, the new deputy. Vic is evicted and must stay in Cady's guest room.
40	7	"Highway Robbery"	Michael Offer	Hunt Baldwin & John Coveny	September 10, 2015
A roadside shooting involving two friends near the casino uncovers a loan-shark ring, but Walt learns the victim had served time for shooting the other who became crippled. Walt attempts to ask out Dr. Donna Monaghan (Ally Walker), a psychiatrist from the veterans clinic; and Gabrielle's rape case inspires Cady to help other natives whose cases have gone unresolved.
41	8	"Hector Lives"	David Boyd	Tony Tost	September 10, 2015
An oil rig worker dies after recently getting promoted. Cady becomes suspicious of Henry when she learns that the worker was one of the rape suspects that Henry inquired about. As Walt and Vic investigate, Henry is shown to also be searching for the other rape suspect and is shot at by Walt in the dark.
42	9	"Shotgun"	J. Michael Muro	Sheri Holman	September 10, 2015
Henry, who has been shot in the leg, accompanies Gabriella into the Crow Nation to take refuge with a medicine woman. Walt and Vic believe Walker, the oil foreman, to be behind a recent murder, until Gabriella becomes a more likely suspect. Zachary learns that a rejected applicant for the deputy job is now stalking the department.
43	10	"What Happens on the Rez..."	Michael Offer	Hunt Baldwin & John Coveny	September 10, 2015
Both Walt and Walker continue to search for Gabriella. Henry is set free by Walt. Nighthorse offers Cady a job as legal representation for the natives. Walt finds Gabriella, but they are stopped by Walker and his men. Unseen, Henry shoots Walker's armed man, allowing Walt to shoot and arrest Walker while Gabriella escapes. Mathias reveals that he has found Henry's bloodstained truck and takes Henry into custody. Later at home, Walt's intimate moment with Donna is interrupted by an intruder.

=== Season 5 (2016) ===
No. overall	No. in season	Title	Directed by	Written by	Original release date
44	1	"A Fog That Won't Lift"	David Boyd	Hunt Baldwin & John Coveny	September 23, 2016
In flashback, Walt is hit on the head and shot by the intruder, while Donna is apparently kidnapped. It is uncertain if Walt or Donna was the primary target. Vic kisses Walt just as he wakes up after surgery. He leaves the hospital soon after waking up. Mathias forces Henry to do his dirty work after figuring out Henry has taken up Hector's role and that he is the one Walt shot. A young man, Andrew, shows up and claims to be Donna's son.
45	2	"One Good Memory"	T. J. Scott	Hunt Baldwin & John Coveny	September 23, 2016
Walt has Eamonn O'Neill, a deputy in neighboring Cumberland County, keep him informed on what is going on there. Eamonn had an involvement with Vic and filled in as an Absaroka deputy after Branch's death. Walt comes across many suspects in the disappearance of Donna and his injuries. Mathias tightens his hold on Henry, who later manages to renegotiate the arrangement. Convinced Walker is the perpetrator, Walt assaults him and is almost arrested by Cumberland County Sheriff Jim Wilkins (Tom Wopat), who fires Eamonn. Walt eventually solves Donna's kidnapping.
46	3	"Chrysalis"	Adam Bluming	Tony Tost	September 23, 2016
Walt helps a 10-year-old girl who Cady finds alone in a car parked at the casino. Jacob becomes more suspicious of Malachi's illegal activities. Walt and Donna work out some issues and continue their relationship.
47	4	"The Judas Wolf"	David Boyd	Sheri Holman	September 23, 2016
Walt tries to persuade Cady to represent him in the wrongful death suit brought by Barlow Connally's estate, but she refuses. Walt and Vic investigate the unusual disappearance of the CEO of a drug company and his assistant. Mathias and Henry investigate a surge in heroin deaths on the reservation. Acting in Hector's role, Henry attacks a heroin dealer at the dealer's home at Mathias' request.
48	5	"Pure Peckinpah"	J. Michael Muro	Tony Tost	September 23, 2016
Bob Barnes gets Walt to help him get his son Billy into rehab for heroin addiction. The heroin dealer is found dead in his car at the Red Pony. Ferg begins a relationship with a nurse at the hospital. Malachi makes an illicit deal with Muldoon. Ferg is ambushed while transporting a prisoner, Eddie Harp, wanted by the FBI.
49	6	"Objection"	Adam Arkin	Boo Killebrew	September 23, 2016
Walt misses his first deposition for the lawsuit. Ferg is missing after the ambush but is shortly found with minor injuries. He reports that the prisoner is freed by the assailants. Walt realizes the Irish Mob is involved in the heroin trade and other illegal activities in the county. He decides to settle the lawsuit but Barlow's estate refuses the offer. Walt identifies Shane Muldoon as the head of the Irish mob and tells him to keep his illegal activities out of Absaroka County.
50	7	"From This Day Forward"	T. J. Scott	Hunt Baldwin & John Coveny	September 23, 2016
A body is found in a hollow tree. A poem about a treasure has gone viral and treasure hunters have started appearing in the area. Cady gets her first case as for her legal clinic; she helps an abused woman married to a white man connected to the oil company that was located in Odin.
51	8	"Stand Your Ground"	Zetna Fuentes	Sheri Holman	September 23, 2016
Despite killing J.P. in self defense, Cady is bothered by guilt and nearly chooses to end her work. Jacob asks Walt to look into an alleged threat from the Irish mob. Mounting evidence points to a secret deal between the mob and Malachi Strand that Jacob was not aware of. A botched hit attempt on Jacob and Walt looks more like the work of Malachi. Henry finds Malachi's ledger outlining illegal activities at the Red Pony and in his job at Jacob's casino. Jacob intends to deal with Malachi as soon as he can, per his deal with Henry to help regain ownership of his bar. Vic uses a pregnancy test, but the results are not seen. She visits Eamonn to talk about their potential future, but does not talk about the possible pregnancy. Walt confronts Malachi, who claims he was just a pawn and implicates Jacob in a grand conspiracy with evidence that presumably doesn't exist. Jacob and Henry kidnap Malachi and confront him with their evidence. Malachi signs ownership of the Red Pony back over to Henry and Jacob cuts Malachi's face to show that he has been banished.
52	9	"Continual Soiree"	J. Michael Muro	Tony Tost	September 23, 2016
Malachi is missing. Walt and Mathias find his phone, significant amounts of blood, and the words "Hector Lives" spelled out in rocks at the same site where Jacob Nighthorse had David Ridges' funeral pyre. Walt becomes even more convinced that Jacob is the ultimate bad guy and that new Hector is his henchman. Walt's crusade against Jacob intensifies, driving a wedge between him and Henry and further alienating Cady. Meanwhile, Vic's pregnancy is confirmed when Travis finds a number of positive pregnancy tests in her trash can. He is sure that he is the father. Travis confronts Vic at her trailer and there are flashback of their one night fling as they talk about what Vic is going to do. Vic takes the stand against Chance Gilbert in the kidnapping case. After ducking his lawyer's calls for weeks, Walt sees him at the courtroom and learns that his civil case is still pending. Chance suggests Vic is Walt's love-sick sycophant. Chance's wife threatens her with retribution for testifying. Walt's memory is triggered by a discussion with Cady about Mingan Pine's suicide, and he starts connecting the dates of Hector's activities. He realizes Henry must be the new Hector and confronts him, leading to a fistfight.
53	10	"The Stuff Dreams Are Made Of"	Michael Offer	Hunt Baldwin & John Coveny	September 23, 2016
Walt learns from an obviously scheming mayor Sawyer Crane that he is likely to be suspended and that the prosecution in his civil case is withholding damning evidence from the FBI. Walt breaks into Monte's house and discovers the evidence is a phone call made from Walt to Barlow two hours before the shooting. Chance Gilbert is convicted and, rather than spend his life in prison, he asks Walt to investigate and charge him with the death of a census worker so that he can go to death row. Walt refuses, but when Vic hears about it she agrees to help. Vic, following Chance's directions, finds a gun with his DNA on it hidden in a bag at the bottom of a stream on his foreclosed property. Chance's sister-in-law attacks her and kicks her in the stomach and tries to drown her, but Vic frees herself and her attacker escapes . Upon learning of the injury, Travis insists that she see a doctor. Ultrasound shows that the baby is fine. Cady talks to Jacob about her dad's obsession with him. She also asks permission to hire a secretary, a Cheyenne girl named Mandy who later thanks Cady by inviting her to a sweat lodge ceremony where she is adopted into the tribe. During the sweat, Cady has a vision. Walt and Donna mutually end their relationship, and his friendship with Henry is also in jeopardy. His lawyer encourages him to give his assets to friends and family in order to protect them. Walt meets with Tucker Baggett, who admits his unfounded prosecution of Walt. He is now the CEO of Barlow's development company and, when Walt loses, he intends to force Walt to sell his land whereon he will build a luxury resort community. Henry gives a ride home to a frantic woman. Upon arriving at her home Henry discovers that the woman is Malachi's grand-daughter and that he has been lured into a trap. Malachi and his men are waiting for him and kidnap him. He is taken to a remote area of the neighboring Crow reservation, staked to the ground, and left for dead. Mayor Sawyer Crane tips his hand to Nighthorse that he is trying to take Walt down.

=== Season 6 (2017) ===
No. overall	No. in season	Title	Directed by	Written by	Original release date
54	1	"The Eagle and the Osprey"	T. J. Scott	Hunt Baldwin	November 17, 2017
A bank robbery, initially attributed to Cowboy Bill, ends in the shooting of the security guard. Mayor Sawyer Crane tries to use it as leverage against Walt, who takes measures to protect his money in the event he loses his case. Cady has flashbacks about her disturbing vision and, when she learns Henry goes missing, she talks to Walt. Ferg jeopardizes his relationship with Meg. Henry is aided but not rescued by the Crow medicine woman. Walt is injured while trying to save Henry.
55	2	"Fever"	Lou Diamond Phillips	Boo Killebrew	November 17, 2017
While Henry recuperates, Walt investigates the murder of a goat farmer whose land is popular with treasure hunters. Cady has second thoughts about working with Nighthorse and talks to Henry. Travis continues to be very involved with Vic, due to the pregnancy, and Vic continues to hide it. Travis tells Walt about Vic's pregnancy.
56	3	"Thank You, Victoria"	J. Michael Muro	Sheri Holman	November 17, 2017
Vic attends Chance Gilbert's court appearance for the murder of the federal agent. With the help of several accomplices, Gilbert manages to escape, so Vic pulls Walt away from his jury selection on the civil suit to help. Vic's aid in bringing the murder charge puts her and Walt in a showdown. Travis intercepts gunmen trying to get into Vic's trailer. Walt and Vic have a final confrontation with Gilbert, and Vic is badly injured while Gilbert is shot and killed by Vic.
57	4	"A Thing I'll Never Understand"	Zetna Fuentes	Leo Geter	November 17, 2017
As a result of her injury, Vic loses the baby, causing Vic to re-examine her life. Henry and Nighthorse team up against Malachi and encounter a dangerous situation. Ferg helps his girlfriend Meg's mother with the tribal police over a situation at the casino. It appears Malachi has invented a new Hector.
58	5	"Burned Up My Tears"	Peter Weller	John Coveny	November 17, 2017
As the trial for his civil suit begins, things don't look good for Walt, especially after the murder of Tucker Baggett on the reservation leaves Vic and Walt as suspects. With his death, Lucian is named the new Connally heir. Mayor Crane tries to force Walt to resign. Walt unofficially investigates Tucker's murder. Sheriff Jim Wilkins tries to railroad Walt. Walt eventually realizes that Lucian is the killer and Lucian confesses, having tried to convince Tucker to drop the case and then killed him when he refused. After Walt refuses to kill him, Lucian commits suicide by jumping off of a cliff, much to Walt's grief.
59	6	"No Greater Character Endorsement"	Adam Bluming	Boo Killebrew	November 17, 2017
In the aftermath of Lucian's death, Walt finds a signed confession that Lucian wrote along with the evidence needed to exonerate him. As Walt's trial resumes, he considers retirement. Cady and Nighthorse's relationship remains strained. The bizarre death of a drug dealer points to a new and violent Hector. The sheriff's office is aided by an old friend. Cady tries to help a sick child whose parents don't trust Western medicine. At Walt's trial, he is unexpectedly aided by Nighthorse who provides testimony and emails revealing Barlow's plot to ruin Walt, revealing his respect for the sheriff despite their many differences. Nighthorse's testimony and evidence ultimately forces the prosecution to drop the entire case after a failed attempt at a settlement.
60	7	"Opiates and Antibiotics"	J. Michael Muro	Hunt Baldwin	November 17, 2017
Aided by a tip from Zach, Walt confirms that Eddie Harp, a presumed dead member of the Irish Mob is alive. Catori makes a desperate decision and kidnaps Tate to take him to a mobile clinic for treatment which is run by a heroin addict. Cady tracks them down with Zach's help and allows Tate to be treated before returning him to his family; Catori is arrested. At the same time, Walt arrests Nighthorse for drug trafficking and sends him to a prison full of Malachi's men, offering to send him into solitary confinement if he gives up Eddie Harp; Nighthorse insists that he has been framed, leaving Walt and Henry with doubt over his guilt. Zach recognizes Eddie as the physician's assistant at the mobile clinic, leading to a standoff where Eddie confesses that he is the new Hector and working for Malachi. Eddie is ultimately shot and killed by Ferg to end the standoff, but also ending any hope of gaining information from him.
61	8	"Cowboy Bill"	Magnus Martens	Sheri Holman	November 17, 2017
Ferg is forced to take a few days off and works on the Cowboy Bill case; Ferg becomes obsessed with the idea that its Meg's ex-boyfriend, leading to her breaking up with him and the man being exonerated. Cowboy Bill proves to be Bob Barnes who is desperate for money to finish paying for his son Billy's rehab; Bob peacefully surrenders to Walt during a hostage situation where Bob proves to be armed with an unloaded gun. Sympathetic, Walt promises to finish paying for Billy's rehab. Vic and Walt hunt down Shane Muldoon. Cady's involvement with Catori has serious consequences and her office is ransacked with the help of her assistant Mandy. Nighthorse finally confesses to working with Shane Muldoon after the funding he was getting from Barlow's estate dried up with the death of Tucker Baggett and leads Walt to Shane who admits that he both lied about Eddie's death and allowed drugs to be sold on the reservation; Walt makes a deal with Shane to turn in Malachi only to have an Agent Decker claim that Shane turned himself in instead. Suspicious, Walt has Vic check with Agent Towson who confirms that Decker was lying, implicating him as the mole; Walt orders all of the information they have on Shane and his crimes sent to the FBI.
62	9	"Running Eagle Challenge"	Michael Offer	Hunt Baldwin & Leo Geter	November 17, 2017
Vic gets a surprise visit from her father who pushes her to return to Philadelphia with him; Vic ultimately decides to stay on but asks for a raise. Agent Vance from Boston works with Walt to track down Decker who has gone missing after his meeting with Walt while Henry tracks down the man who signed for the heroin shipments at the casino. Using the seized heroin as bait, they are able to capture Decker who confesses to working for Shane Muldoon; after receiving a picture of Shane's supposedly dead body, Walt convinces Decker to reveal the location of his next meeting with Malachi. Vic finally deals with her emotions and a difficult race enables her to move forward. Cady and Zach begin a relationship and Cady pushes her father to rehire Zach. Nighthorse is facing continual difficulties compounded by the fact that he used casino profits to pay for his million dollar bail.
63	10	"Goodbye Is Always Implied"	Christopher Chulack	Hunt Baldwin	November 17, 2017
Facing criminal charges, Nighthorse offers Henry to take over the casino in his absence, but both are kidnapped by Malachi's men. Malachi forces Nighthorse to sign over the deeds while Walt, Vic, Ferg, Mathias and a rehired Zach search for him. Walt is aided by the Crow medicine woman, but they are ambushed by one of Malachi's men who fatally wounds the old woman. With the help of clues on the picture of Shane's body and the shooter's clothes, the group tracks Malachi to an old sawmill on the Crow reservation, where they subdue most of Malachi's men and an escaped Henry kills Darius. Walt is left with a choice of whether or not to save Nighthorse and chooses to do the right thing. Malachi is killed by Walt in a final confrontation and the deeds are recovered. In the aftermath, Henry takes over the casino, Ferg reconciles with Meg, and Vic and Walt begin a relationship. Walt decides to retire and encourages Cady to run for sheriff in his place while Walt searches for the buried treasure that Lucian claimed to have found. In the final scene, Walt is riding his horse when he gets a call, revealing that he finally got his own phone.
