= Greer Shephard =

American television producer and director

Greer Shephard (born March 16, 1967) is an American television producer, showrunner and director.

== Early career ==
In 1991, she joined ABC to serve as vice president of drama programming. She ultimately left in 1997.

== Work ==
In 1998, she and director Michael M. Robin launched The Shephard/Robin Company with a commitment deal at Buena Vista TV Productions. In 2001, Shephard and Robin, after three years at Disney, joined Warner Bros. Television. Their producing success included Nip/Tuck, The Closer, Major Crimes and Popular. Together they showran the neo-western series Longmire. The show was subsequently cancelled by A&E in 2014, but revived by Netflix for a further two seasons.

== Personal life ==
Shepherd was married to actor Bob Clendenin from 1995 to 1998 and has a daughter.

== Legacy ==
Showrunners Ryan Murphy and Tony Tost consider Shepherd to be their mentor and the first person to give them a break.

== Awards ==
Shepherd won a Peabody Award in 1998 for the series Nothing Sacred and the Golden Globe in 2005 for the series, Nip/Tuck. She was nominated for a PGA Award in 2005.

The Hollywood Reporter called her one of the industry's top showrunners in 2012.
