= Dan Hildebrand =

British actor

- Occupation: Actor
- Years active: 1988–present

Dan Hildebrand is a British actor.

== Career ==
He was educated at Highgate School in north London. He has appeared in TV shows such as Sons of Anarchy, Lost, NYPD Blue and Longmire as well as playing two separate roles in Deadwood. Hildebrand also had a recurring role as Kraznys mo Nakloz in season three of HBO's Game of Thrones.

Hildebrand is heavily involved in philanthropic work and rebuilding communities impacted by natural disasters, and in December 2013 was honored at the Social Impact Awards in Los Angeles.

== Selected filmography ==
=== Film ===
Year	Title	Role	Notes
1990	Wilt	Constable	
1994	My Girl 2	Hari Krishna	
1999	Clubland	Jimmy	
2000	Gone in 60 Seconds	Saul	
2000	Hotel Splendide	Waiter	
2007	Trust Me	Alex Solanski	
2014	Postman Pat: The Movie	Ted Glenn	Voice only
2026	Jumanji: Open World	Donatas	Post-production

=== Television ===
Year	Title	Role	Notes
1988	Tumbledown	Prothero	TV film
1989	Agatha Christie's Poirot	Chauffeur	1 episode ("The Incredible Theft")
1991	Soldier Soldier	Cpl Gary Roberts	2 episodes
1993	seaQuest DSV	Helmsman Carleton	2 episodes
1994	Ray Alexander: A Taste for Justice	Bartender	TV film
1996	NYPD Blue	Mike	1 episode ("A Death in the Family")
1996	Lois & Clark: The New Adventures of Superman	Ran	2 episodes
2001	She Creature	Christian	TV film
2003	The Booze Cruise	Man	TV film
2004–2006	Deadwood	Tim Driscoll / Shaughnessy	6 episodes
2009	Lost	Custodian	1 episode ("Jughead")
2010	Sons of Anarchy	Sean Casey	7 episodes
2013	Game of Thrones	Kraznys mo Nakloz	3 episodes
2013	Longmire	Wayne	1 episode ("Unquiet Mind")
2014	Rectify	Hollis	2 episodes
2015	Bones	Nathan Barlow	1 episode ("The Brother in the Basement")
2015	Scream Queens	Detective Baxter	1 episode ("Mommie Dearest")
2017	Still Star-Crossed	Friar Lawrence	Series regular
2018	I'm Poppy	Ivan Kross	Lead role

=== Video games ===
Year	Title	Role	Notes
2004	The Bard's Tale	Additional voices	
