= Night Sky (TV series) =

Science fiction television series

- Release poster
- Genre: Science fiction; Drama
- Created by: Holden Miller
- Starring: Sissy Spacek; J. K. Simmons; Chai Hansen; Adam Bartley; Julieta Zylberberg; Sonya Walger; Rocío Hernández; Kiah McKirnan; Beth Lacke; Stephen Louis Grush; Cass Buggé
- Country of origin: United States
- Original language: English/Spanish
- No. of seasons: 1
- No. of episodes: 8

Production
- Executive producers: Daniel C. Connolly; Holden Miller; Jimmy Miller; Sam Hansen; Juan José Campanella
- Production companies: Amazon Studios; Legendary Television; Mosaic; Sunshine Park Productions

Original release
- Network: Amazon Prime Video
- Release: May 20, 2022

Night Sky is an American science fiction drama television series created by Holden Miller for Amazon Studios and Legendary Television. It stars Sissy Spacek and J. K. Simmons as a couple who possess a chamber leading to another planet. Chai Hansen, Adam Bartley, Julieta Zylberberg, Rocío Hernández, Kiah McKirnan, Beth Lacke, Stephen Louis Grush, and Cass Buggé co-star. The series was shot in Illinois and Jujuy Province, Argentina.

Night Sky was released on May 20, 2022, on Amazon Prime Video. In July 2022, the series was cancelled after one season.

== Premise ==
An elderly couple in Illinois discover that under their land lies a device that can teleport them to a chamber that looks out onto the barren landscape and star-filled sky of another world.

== Cast ==
- Sissy Spacek as Irene York, a retired English teacher in Farnsworth, Illinois, who is Franklin's wife and Denise's paternal grandmother.
- J. K. Simmons as Franklin York, a former woodworker, who is Irene's husband of over 50 years and Denise's paternal grandfather.
- Chai Hansen as Jude, an enigmatic young man who appears suddenly by the portal and becomes a "caretaker" for the Yorks. It is revealed that he has escaped from the Cult of Caerul.
- Adam Bartley as Byron, the Yorks' new nosy and socially awkward neighbor.
- Julieta Zylberberg as Stella, a mother in Argentina on a secretive mission to find an elusive man. She is a member of the Cult of Caerul.
- Rocío Hernández as Toni, Stella's isolated and impulsive daughter.
- Piotr Adamczyk as Cornelius, the mysterious man in charge of sending Stella and Nick on missions. He is a high-ranking member of the Cult of Caerul.
- Kiah McKirnan as Denise, an MBA student, who is the Yorks' granddaughter.
- Beth Lacke as Chandra, a former student of Irene, who works as a caregiver despite her kleptomania.
- Sonya Walger as Hannah, a former member of the cult who now heads the Fallen World, an organization fighting the cult.
- Stephen Louis Grush as Nick, a pugnacious member of the Cult of Caerul who at first aids Stella in her mission.
- Angus O'Brien as Michael, the Yorks' deceased son and Denise's father, who died by suicide when Denise was five years old.
- Cass Buggé as Jeanine, Byron's wife.

== Episodes ==
No.	Title	Directed by	Written by	Original release date
1	"To the Stars"	Juan José Campanella	Holden Miller	May 20, 2022
2	"La Capilla"	Juan José Campanella & Philip Martin	Holden Miller & Daniel C. Connolly	May 20, 2022
3	"The Caretaker"	Philip Martin	Holden Miller	May 20, 2022
4	"Boilermakers"	Robert Pulcini & Shari Springer Berman	Daniel C. Connolly	May 20, 2022
5	"Driving Lessons"	Sara Colangelo	Allison Moore	May 20, 2022
6	"Dear Franklin"	Jessica Lowrey	Anne-Marie Hess & Ezra Claytan Daniels	May 20, 2022
7	"Lake Diving"	Victoria Mahoney	Holden Miller & Daniel C. Connolly	May 20, 2022
8	"Compensation"	Philip Martin	Holden Miller & Daniel C. Connolly	May 20, 2022

== Production ==
Night Sky is an American co-production between Amazon Studios and Legendary Television, created by Holden Miller and Daniel C. Connolly. The project was given a series order on October 21, 2020. Sissy Spacek and Ed O'Neill joined the cast in March 2021. O'Neill left the show the following month and was replaced by J. K. Simmons. Chai Hansen, Adam Bartley, Julieta Zylberberg, Rocío Hernández, and Kiah McKirnan were added to the cast as series regulars in May 2021. Principal photography began in June 2021 in the state of Illinois. Notable filming locations include the city of Woodstock, Cinespace Film Studios in Chicago, and the villages of Frankfort, Wauconda, and Island Lake. In August 2021, it was reported Beth Lacke, Stephen Louis Grush, and Cass Buggé would star in recurring roles. Filming was scheduled to conclude in October 2021.

On July 5, 2022, Amazon Prime Video canceled the series after one season when its viewer count failed to justify production costs. Pre-production on a prospective second season had been set to begin in September 2022.

== Release ==
The series was released on May 20, 2022, on Amazon Prime Video.

== Reception ==
The review aggregator website Rotten Tomatoes reported a 73% approval rating with an average rating of 6.4/10, based on 45 critic reviews. The website's critics consensus reads, "Night Sky reaches for the stars when it really should have settled on a feature length finish, but the combined supernova of J.K. Simmons and Sissy Spacek shines bright." Metacritic, which uses a weighted average, assigned a score of 66 out of 100 based on 18 critics, indicating "generally favorable reviews".
