= Craig Johnson (author) =

American author (born 1961)

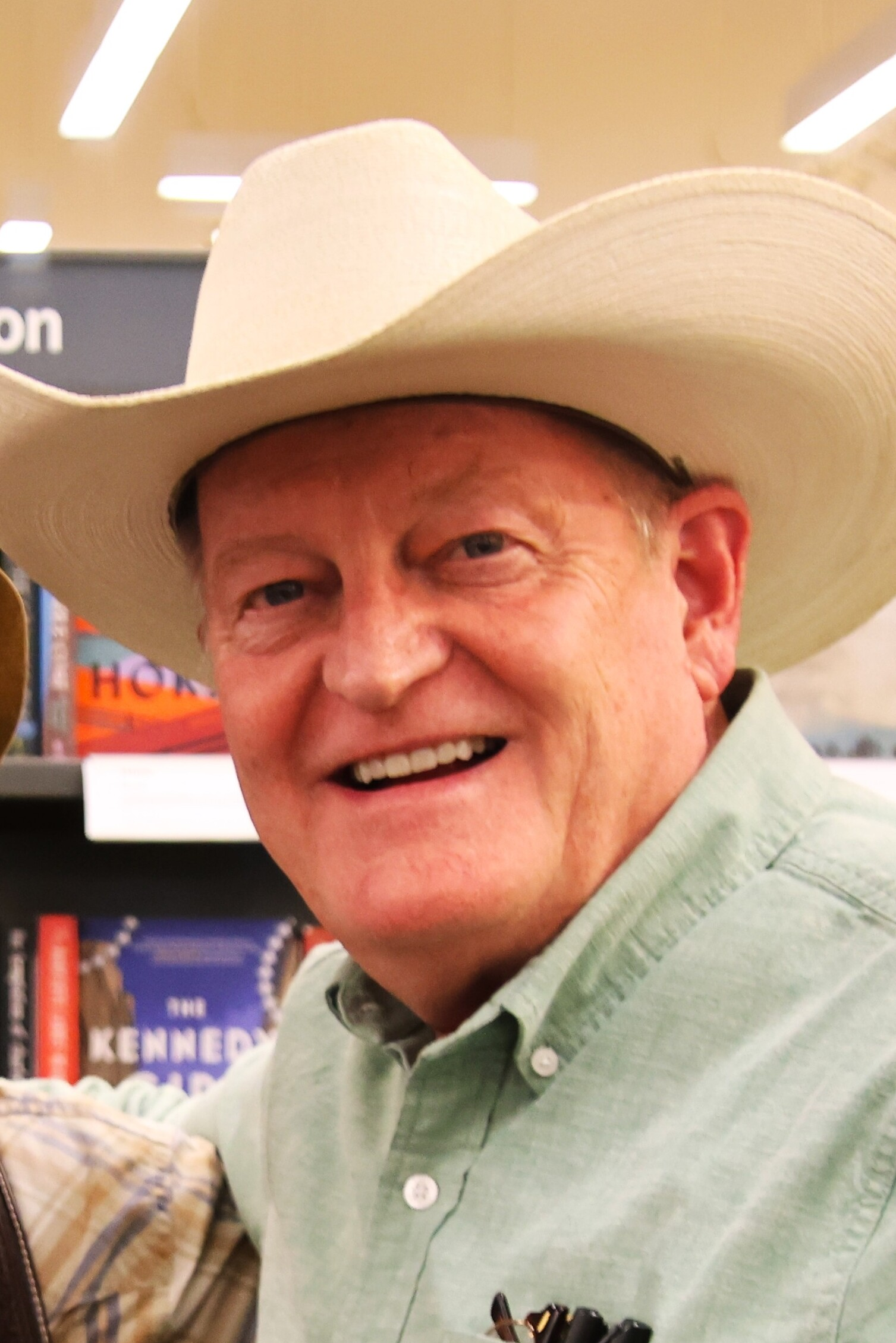
- Johnson in 2026
- Born: Craig Allen Johnson; January 16, 1961 (age 65)
- Education: Marshall University
- Occupations: Novelist, short story writer.
- Spouse: Judy Johnson
- Writing career
- Language: English
- Genres: Mystery, Crime fiction, Detective fiction, Westerns
- Notable work: Walt Longmire series of novels
- Website: www.craigallenjohnson.com

Craig Allen Johnson (born January 16, 1961) is an American author who writes mystery novels. He is best known for his Sheriff Walt Longmire novel series. The books are set in northern Wyoming, where Longmire is sheriff of the fictional county of Absaroka. The series debuted in 2004 and as of May 2026, Johnson has written 22 novels, two novellas, and many short stories featuring Longmire. Some of the novels have been on The New York Times Best Seller list. In 2012, Warner Horizon adapted the main characters and the Wyoming settings of the novels for a television series. Johnson lives at a ranch where he built a residence in the small town of Ucross, Wyoming—population 25. Although he identified himself as a former New York police officer while promoting his early novels, a 2009 New York Times profile revealed this to be misleading.

== Career ==
=== Books ===
As of September 2021, Johnson has authored 23 books featuring Sheriff Walt Longmire. They have been translated into 14 languages and have won numerous awards, including the Nouvel Observateur Prix du Roman Noir and the SNCF Mystery of the Year.

=== TV adaptations ===
The A&E TV series Longmire, based on Johnson's novels, premiered on June 3, 2012, with cast members Robert Taylor, Katee Sackhoff, Lou Diamond Phillips, Bailey Chase, Adam Bartley, A Martinez, Zahn McClarnon, and John Bishop. Filmed in New Mexico, Longmire debuted as A&E's number-one original-series premiere of all time with 4.1 million total viewers. After the third season, A&E canceled the series and subsequently seasons four to six were made for Netflix.

== Influence ==
The success of Johnson's novels is celebrated in an annual festival, called Longmire Days, held in the small town of Buffalo, Wyoming, the real-life inspiration for the series' fictional setting. Close to 12,000 people attend the festival each year, including the author, many of the actors from the TV series, and (on occasion) the publishers and producers.

== Personal life ==
Craig Johnson grew up in Huntington, West Virginia, and attended college at Marshall University.

Johnson lives in Ucross, Wyoming, with his wife Judy.

== Bibliography ==
=== Walt Longmire series ===
| Title | Year | ISBN 1st Edition | Notes |
|---|---|---|---|
| The Cold Dish | 2004 | 9780143036425 | |
| Death Without Company | 2006 | 9780143038382 | |
| Kindness Goes Unpunished | 2007 | 9780143113133 | |
| Another Man's Moccasins | 2008 | 9780143115526 | 2009 Spur Award for Best Western Short Novel |
| The Dark Horse | 2009 | 9780143117315 | |
| Junkyard Dogs | 2010 | 9780143119531 | |
| Hell Is Empty | 2011 | 9780143120988 | |
| Divorce Horse | 2012 | 9781101592649 | eBook short story |
| As the Crow Flies | 2012 | 9780143123293 | |
| Christmas in Absaroka County | 2012 | 9781101623718 | collection of four eBook short stories |
| Messenger | 2013 | 9780143127826 | eBook short story |
| A Serpent's Tooth | 2013 | 9780670026456 | |
| Spirit of Steamboat | 2013 | 9780143125877 | novella |
| Any Other Name | 2014 | 9780143126973 | |
| Wait for Signs | 2014 | 9780143127826 | collection of 12 short stories |
| Dry Bones | 2015 | 9780525426936 | |
| The Highwayman | 2016 | 9780735220904 | novella |
| An Obvious Fact | 2016 | 9780143109129 | |
| The Western Star | 2017 | 9780143109136 | |
| Depth of Winter | 2018 | 9780525522478 | |
| Land of Wolves | 2019 | 9780525522508 | |
| Next to Last Stand | 2020 | 9780525522539 | |
| Daughter of the Morning Star | 2021 | 9780593297254 | |
| Hell and Back | 2022 | 9780593297285 | |
| The Longmire Defense | 2023 | 9780593297315 | |
| First Frost | 2024 | 9780593830673 | |
| Tooth and Claw | 2024 | 9780593834169 | novella |
| Return to Sender | 2025 | 9780593830703 | |
| The Brothers McKay | 2026 | 9780593830741 | |

=== Critical studies and reviews of Johnson's work ===
- Abele, Elizabeth (Fall 2023). "From Alexie's Indian Killer to Johnson's Longmire series: expanding the landscape of the American Indian detective novel". Clues: A Journal of Detection. 41 (2): 31–42.
