= Walt Longmire =

Fictional character

Walter Longmire is a fictional character created by American author Craig Johnson (b. 1961).

Longmire is the title character of Walt Longmire Mysteries, a series of western mystery novels first published in 2004. The novels were adapted into Longmire, a crime drama television series which premiered in 2012 and was developed by John Coveny and Hunt Baldwin. Longmire is portrayed by Australian actor Robert Taylor.

== Walt Longmire Mysteries ==
Walt Longmire
- Walt Longmire Mysteries character
- First appearance: "The Cold Dish"; December 29, 2004
- Created by: Craig Johnson

In-universe information
- Full name: Walter Longmire
- Gender: Male
- Title(s): Sheriff of Absaroka County, Wyoming
- Occupation: Sheriff
- Spouse: Martha Longmire (deceased)
- Children: Cady Longmire (daughter)
- Nationality: American

Police career
- Department: Absaroka County Sheriff's Department
- Years of service: 1972–present
- Rank: Sheriff

=== Fictional biography ===
Walt is a native of Durant, Wyoming, the county seat of fictional Absaroka County, named after the real-life Absaroka Native Americans, the Absaroka Range, and the 1930s effort to declare a U.S. state called Absaroka out of territory from three existing states.

Longmire attended the University of Southern California, where he played offensive lineman for the USC Trojans and graduated with a degree in English literature. He then served in the Marine Corps and completed boot camp at Marine Corps Recruit Depot Parris Island and Officer Candidates School at Marine Corps Base Quantico. He was assigned to the 1st Marine Division as a military police officer, and served in country at Tan Son Nhut Air Base during the Vietnam War. He served in the Marines for four years, and earned, among other decorations, the Navy Cross, Silver Star, Bronze Star, and Purple Heart. After serving in Vietnam, Walt spent six weeks assigned as security at Johnston Atoll.

Upon his discharge from the Marines, Walt spent some time working at an oil rig in Anchorage, Alaska, before returning home to Wyoming, where he was hired by Sheriff Lucian Connally as a deputy sheriff in 1972. Walt was elected as the Absaroka County Sheriff after Lucian all but threw the race and decided to retire.

=== In the series ===
In the first book, The Cold Dish, Walt is mentioned as having been the sheriff of Absaroka County and plans to run for re-election again the following year. He investigates the murders of two white teenagers who had been found guilty, but not severely punished, for raping a local Indian girl, Melissa Little Bird.

In Death Without Company, Walt investigates the death of a Basque woman who was, for a few hours in the 1940s, married to Lucian before her family had the marriage annulled. During his tenure as sheriff "of the least populated county in the least populated state in the union", five murders have occurred in Absaroka County, with three of them taking place since 2004 (in The Cold Dish and Death Without Company).

In Kindness Goes Unpunished, Walt visits his daughter Cady in Philadelphia, where he joins forces with the Philadelphia Police Department to investigate an assault on Cady that has left her in a coma.

In Another Man's Moccasins, Walt investigates the murder of a young Vietnamese woman, which reminds him of his first murder investigation – the death of a prostitute outside of Tan Son Nhut Air Base by an American officer in 1968.

In The Dark Horse, Walt goes undercover as an insurance investigator from Billings, Montana, in Campbell County, Wyoming (at the unofficial request of the Campbell County Sheriff), to determine if a woman truly murdered her husband, a man with a dubious past and a gift for making enemies, after he allegedly burned down their barn and killed their horses for the insurance money.

In Hell is Empty, Walt becomes lost in the Bighorn Mountains with a federal prisoner/serial killer. This book was later adapted into the Longmire season two episode "Unquiet Mind".

In As the Crow Flies, Walt assists the newly appointed chief of the Northern Cheyenne Indian Reservation Tribal Police, Iraq War veteran Lolo Long, with the investigation into the death of a young woman who fell from a cliff with her child in her arms, while simultaneously preparing for Cady's wedding.

In A Serpent's Tooth, Walt deals with a multi-state polygamous cult when he tries to help a Mormon "lost boy" that leads to Big Oil, the Central Intelligence Agency, and a Mexican drug cartel, which ultimately costs the life of one of his deputies and the grievous injury of another.

In Spirit of Steamboat, Walt flashes back to Christmas Eve 1988 (during his second month as sheriff) when he helps Lucian and a World War II veteran of the 38th Bombardment Group transport an injured girl (the sole survivor of a car accident) from Durant to Denver during a snowstorm in a decommissioned North American B-25 Mitchell.

In Any Other Name, Walt investigates the suicide of a Campbell County Sheriff's Investigator at the request of Lucian and Sheriff Sandy Sandburg, which nearly causes him to miss the birth of his grandchild in Philadelphia.

In Dry Bones, Walt deals with the discovery of a Tyrannosaurus rex skeleton on Native American land within his county and the subsequent death of the property's owner, resulting in a joint investigation with the FBI under the scrutiny of the newly announced deputy United States attorney for the district of Wyoming. In the middle of the investigation, Walt learns that his son-in-law, Officer Michael Moretti, was killed in the line of duty in Philadelphia; although he desperately wants to fly east and assist in the investigation, he remains stuck in Durant to complete his own case (however, he does allow Vic, Michael's sister, to take a leave of absence).

During his career, Walter becomes well-respected not only by his county but also by the Wyoming State Attorney General's Office (including the Attorney General, Joe Meyer, himself), the DCI, and even the Governor of Wyoming. It is later mentioned, somewhat jokingly, that if a police officer is murdered in Wyoming, Walt Longmire is on the case.

As sheriff, Walt carries an M1911A1 in .45 ACP (the same one he used in the Marine Corps) as his primary weapon, and drives a pickup truck that he calls the Silver Bullet (or just Bullet).

=== Relationships ===
Walt is a widower; Martha, his wife, died of cancer (in the books; in the TV series she was murdered in Denver, Colorado, while suffering from cancer). With Martha, he had a daughter, Cady, who is now an attorney in Philadelphia. In As the Crow Flies, Walt mentions that he dated Martha before he was drafted, and that their relationship resumed after he came home from the war. The two eloped and were married by a justice of the peace in Miles City, Montana, when her father refused to pay for a big church wedding. In the same book, Cady marries Philadelphia Police Officer Michael Moretti, the brother of Walt's undersheriff, Vic Moretti, on the Rez; Michael and she had been seeing each other since Kindness Goes Unpunished and engaged since The Dark Horse. In Any Other Name, Cady gives birth to a daughter, Lola Longmire Moretti. In The Western Star, it is revealed that Walt and Martha first got pregnant in 1972, but they lost the baby in a first-trimester miscarriage.

Walt's closest friend and confidant is Henry Standing Bear. They have been friends since they were 12 years old, and both served in Vietnam (although Henry was a member of the United States Army Special Forces, while Walt was a Marine MP), where they were both highly decorated. When Cady was born, Walt appointed Henry her godfather.

After Cady is assaulted in Philadelphia, Vic (who was assisting the police in the investigation) and Walt have sex. In the aftermath, Walt mentions that he has had sex with only six women in his life. The two continue their relationship after returning to Durant; in A Serpent's Tooth, Walt learns from the doctor that Vic was pregnant, but lost the baby after being stabbed during the confrontation with Tomás Bidarte. As of Any Other Name, neither Walt nor Vic knows that the other is aware of the pregnancy, but in Dry Bones, Vic reveals that she knows Walt had been told.

=== Appearances ===
To date, Walt has appeared in these books:

1. The Cold Dish – December 29, 2004
2. Death Without Company – March 16, 2006
3. Kindness Goes Unpunished – March 15, 2007
4. Another Man's Moccasins – May 26, 2009
5. The Dark Horse – May 25, 2010
6. Junkyard Dogs – October 22, 2010
7. Hell is Empty – October 7, 2011
8. Divorce Horse (eBook) – April 16, 2012
9. As the Crow Flies – May 15, 2012
10. Christmas in Absaroka County (eBook) – December 4, 2012
11. Messenger (eBook) – April 23, 2013
12. A Serpent's Tooth – June 4, 2013
13. Spirit of Steamboat – October 17, 2013
14. Any Other Name – May 13, 2014
15. Wait for Signs: Twelve Longmire Stories – October 21, 2014
16. Dry Bones – May 12, 2015
17. The Highwayman – May 17, 2016
18. An Obvious Fact – September 13, 2016
19. The Western Star – September 5, 2017
20. Depth of Winter - September 4, 2018
21. Land of Wolves - September 17, 2019
22. Next to Last Stand - September 22, 2020
23. Daughter of the Morning Star - September 21, 2021
24. Hell and Back - September 6, 2022
25. The Longmire Defense - September 5, 2023
26. First Frost - May 28, 2024
27. Tooth and Claw - Nov 19, 2024
28. Return to Sender - May 27, 2025

== Longmire (TV series) ==
Walt Longmire
- Longmire character
- First appearance: "Pilot" (Longmire); June 3, 2012
- Portrayed by: Robert Taylor

In-universe information
- Full name: Walter Longmire
- Species: Human
- Gender: Male
- Title(s): Sheriff of Absaroka County, WY
- Occupation: Sheriff
- Spouse: Martha Longmire (d. 2011)
- Children: Cady Longmire (daughter)
- Nationality: American

Police career
- Department: Absaroka County Sheriff's Department
- Rank: Sheriff

=== History ===
Absaroka County native Walt Longmire is the well-respected sheriff that resides there. When the series begins, it is believed by most that his wife, Martha Longmire, died of cancer.

His father was a rancher who managed the stables of Absaroka County's most wealthy family, the Van Blarcoms. He is a graduate of Durant High School Class of '71, and his football jersey still hangs in the school's trophy case.

In their 20s, he and Henry worked at Prudhoe Bay Oil Field in Alaska.

Walt has been the Sheriff of Absaroka County since at least 2005; his immediate predecessor was Sheriff Lucian Connally (Peter Weller), the uncle of Branch.

In 2010, Walt arrested Malachi Strand (Graham Greene), the Chief of the Cheyenne Reservation Tribal Police, for extortion; he also has an adversarial relationship with the current CRTP Chief, Mathias (Zahn McClarnon), although the two have a bond of mutual respect.

=== In the series ===
Laconic and introspective with a strong sense of duty and justice, Walt is a throwback to the iconic lone hero of classical westerns. He is an able detective with a knack for finding the truth behind various crimes committed in his county.

As the series starts in 2012, Walt is slowly coming out of a deep grieving period where he delegated most of the day-to-day police duties to Deputies Branch Connally (Bailey Chase), Archie "The Ferg" Ferguson (Adam Bartley), and Victoria "Vic" Moretti (Katee Sackhoff). This is complicated by Branch running against Walt in the upcoming sheriff election.

Walt is investigated by Denver PD Detective Fales (Charles S. Dutton) for the murder of Miller Beck, a meth-head suspected of murdering Walt's wife, Martha. It is revealed that Fales is pushing the case of Beck, a drug-using suspected mugger and killer, so hard because of Fales' own experience with a small-town sheriff, whose racism and abuse of authority left Fales with a deep distrust of those particular law enforcement officers. It is eventually revealed that Walt's best friend Henry Standing Bear hired Cheyenne mercenary Hector to take care of Beck, but Hector didn't kill him. Throughout the third season, Henry is facing murder charges in Beck's death, but Walt realizes that his deputy Branch Connally's nemesis David Ridges, recently killed in a struggle with Walt, is actually the killer. Using forensic evidence recovered from Beck's body and Ridges' car, Walt is able to clear Henry's name and prove that Ridges was the true killer. In the aftermath, Branch is murdered by his own father after learning that the man had hired Ridges to kill Martha in order to give Branch an advantage in his ultimately failed run for sheriff.

In 2015, after killing Barlow Connally (Gerald McRaney) on his own front porch, Walt spends six weeks on administrative leave while the death is investigated by the FBI; Walt is cleared of any criminal charges in the death in the end. Having learned that Barlow was responsible for Martha's murder, Walt appears to finally find a sense of peace during this time. A number of weeks later, Walt learns that he is being sued for wrongful death by Barlow's estate. This is revealed to be a plot by prosecutor Tucker Baggett to take Walt's property and build a golf course; thanks to the surprise help of Walt's longtime nemesis Jacob Nighthorse, the case is dropped.

As sheriff, Walt carries an Colt Government Model in .45 ACP and a Winchester Model 1894 in .30-30 as his primary weapons, and drives a Ford Bronco as his duty vehicle. He does not own a cell phone (although he will on numerous occasions borrow one from his deputies or Henry) and takes his calls on a land line at home or in the office, or over the radio in his vehicle.

At the end of the series, Walt decides to retire as sheriff and encourages his daughter Cady to run for sheriff in his place. Instead, Walt begins a search for Lord Anson Hamilton's buried treasure which Lucian Connally claimed to have found before his death. In the series' final scene, Walt is shown to finally own a cell phone of his own as he commences his search.

==== Kill count ====
In the TV series, Walt has been forced to use deadly force on a number of occasions.

1. Chance Gilbert's brother – shot ("Population 25")
2. Dan Estes – shot ("Pilot")
3. Octavio Mora – shot ("The Cancer")
4. Wayne Durell – beaten ("Unquiet Mind")
5. Zip – shot ("Sound and Fury")
6. David Ridges – stabbed ("Counting Coup")
7. Barlow Connally – shot ("High Noon")
8. One of Malachi Strand's henchmen – shot ("Goodbye Is Always Implied")
9. Brian O'Keane – shot ("Goodbye Is Always Implied")
10. Malachi Strand – shot ("Goodbye Is Always Implied")

=== Relationships ===
Walt was married for 25 years to Martha Longmire, with whom he has a daughter, Cady (Cassidy Freeman), an attorney. Martha was diagnosed with cancer in the late 2000s/early 2010s, and died in 2011. Although Walt let everybody (including Cady) assume it was the cancer that took her life, Martha was murdered in an apparent mugging in Denver, Colorado, by a man named Miller Beck. During his own investigation into his wife's death, Walt learned that Beck was hired to kill Martha, and then he was killed shortly thereafter to prevent him from talking to Walt. In "High Noon", Walt gets a drunken confession out of Barlow Connally, who admits to killing his own son and having Martha murdered; in the ensuing confrontation, Walt fatally shoots Barlow, avenging his deputy and his wife.

In "Highway Robbery", Walt asks out Dr. Donna Sue Monaghan (Ally Walker), a psychiatrist who works for the VA in Sheridan, Wyoming.

Walt's closest friend and confidant is Henry Standing Bear. They have been friends since they were 12 years old. When Cady was born, Walt appointed Henry her godfather.

Shortly before the show's timeline begins, Walt hired Vic Moretti, a former Philadelphia PD homicide detective, as a deputy sheriff. The two are believed by many to be having an affair, including at one point Vic's husband, Sean Keegan (Michael Mosley). In the Season 6 finale Walt and Vic finally realize and admit their feelings for one another, and begin a relationship.

Walt's relationship with the Cheyenne Nation is strained, but he is still liked by many members of its community.

=== Deputies ===
In the series, Walt is assisted with his duties by three deputy sheriffs. After Branch's death, Walt hires Zachary Heflin, but fires him after he assaults a rejected deputy applicant who was stalking him.

- Deputy Sheriff Branch Connally, ACSD (2008–2014, suspended; killed by Barlow Connally)
- Deputy Sheriff Archie "The Ferg" Ferguson, ACSD (2011–present)
- Deputy Sheriff Victoria "Vic" Moretti, ACSD (2011–present)
- Deputy Sheriff Zachary "Zack" Heflin, ACSD (2015, fired; rehired, 2017)
- Deputy Sheriff Jess "Double Tuff" Ailiff, Worked a northern substation

In addition, Deputy Sheriff Eamonn O'Neill was on loan from Cumberland County to assist the office when both Walt and Branch were otherwise occupied, leaving Vic to run day-to-day affairs.

Ruby (no last name specified) runs the sheriff's office and serves as dispatcher.

== Differences between the books and TV series ==
Among the key differences between the books and the TV series are the character's age and backstory. In the books, it is established that Walt is a college graduate and Vietnam War veteran, and has been the Absaroka County Sheriff since the early 1980s. However, on the TV show, no mention have been made or alluded to of a college though it indirectly alludes to him being a military veteran, able to make an appointment at the VA with psychiatrist Dr. Donna Sue Monahan, without providing any details of when or where he served. Walt's age has been established multiple times, via his having graduated from high school in 1981 and having been friends with Henry since they were 12 years old, 38 years earlier.

In a significant departure from the books, on the show, Walt's wife Martha did not die from cancer. Although she was diagnosed with the disease, in the TV series she was murdered, and the associated details are slowly revealed over several seasons, significantly affecting Walt's relationships with his deputy Branch and the Connally family.

While the TV series portrays Vic as being interested in Walt, her feelings are not reciprocated like they are in the books. Instead, the TV series has Walt slowly recovering from losing his wife, unable or unwilling to maintain a relationship with a woman called Lizzie Ambrose, before finally showing enough interest in a member of the opposite sex to actively court Dr. Donna Sue Monaghan. Only as the show draws to a close does Walt start a relationship with Vic.

In the books, Absaroka County sees five murders in 24 years. The TV series sees 27 confirmed murders in the two first seasons alone.

=== Longmire Days ===
In 2012, the first Annual "Longmire Days" was held in the city of Buffalo, Wyoming, celebrating the series and local community.
