= Donnybrook (film) =

2018 film by Tim Sutton

- Theatrical release poster
- Directed by: Tim Sutton
- Screenplay by: Tim Sutton
- Based on: Donnybrook by Frank Bill
- Produced by: David Lancaster; Stephanie Wilcox
- Starring: Frank Grillo; Margaret Qualley; James Badge Dale; Jamie Bell
- Cinematography: David Ungaro
- Edited by: Scott Cummings
- Music by: Phill Mossman; Jens Bjørnkjær
- Production companies: Rumble Films; BackUp Media; The Jokers
- Distributed by: IFC Films
- Release dates: September 7, 2018 (TIFF); February 15, 2019 (United States)
- Running time: 101 minutes
- Countries: United States; France
- Language: English
- Box office: $26,284

Donnybrook (also known as Below the Belt: Brawl at Donnybrook in the United Kingdom) is a 2018 crime drama film written and directed by Tim Sutton, based on the novel of the same name by Frank Bill. It stars Jamie Bell, Frank Grillo, James Badge Dale, and Margaret Qualley.

It had its world premiere at the 2018 Toronto International Film Festival, in the Platform program. It was released on February 15, 2019, by IFC Films.

== Plot ==
Jarhead Earl is a former U.S. Marine living with a wife and two kids in a trailer park. Known as a tough guy, he seeks to leave his surroundings in favor of a fresh start for his family, and the only way he sees an out is by winning the Donnybrook, a massive bare-knuckle fight. Earl robs a local gun shop for the money to enter the contest and returns home, encountering Chainsaw Angus, a psychotic meth dealer to whom Earl's wife owes money. After a brief struggle, Angus leaves, driven by his sister and accomplice Delia. Earl takes his family and flees the trailer park for the Donnybrook.

Angus and Delia return to their cookhouse and see it up in flames. After killing their cooker who escaped the fire, they pay a visit to their partner, Eldon, seeking money to restart their operation. When he refuses, Angus orders Delia to kill him. She does, but rapes Eldon first; while doing so, Eldon tells Delia that she should kill Angus instead. Delia kills Eldon, but continues to be abused and belittled by Angus. Eventually, Delia is driven to contemplate suicide, but relents, instead going to Angus and shooting him. Overhearing Earl's plans to enter the Donnybrook earlier, she takes a stash of meth and sets out for the Donnybrook as well. Angus is not dead, and after killing an innocent for his car, he vows to find his sister and his meth.

Meanwhile, Whalen, a local cop with a drinking problem, is investigating the gun shop robbery as well as the fire at the cookhouse. Running into his ex-girlfriend, she tells him about Angus. Whalen makes taking down Angus his personal mission, finally confronting him in a parking lot. The two men shoot at each other with shotguns. Angus fatally wounds Whalen and leaves him for dead.

Angus tracks down Earl's son and kills him. He arrives at the site of the Donnybrook, sneaks up on Delia, and drags her into the woods where he strangles her to death. The Donnybrook begins in a chain link cage as a no holds barred melee. After a few minutes of fighting, Earl and Angus are the last fighters standing. They are given a break before they face off against each other. Angus uses the break to tell Earl that he killed his son. Back in the cage, Earl eventually manages to overpower Angus, shouting "You killed my boy!" as he breaks Angus' neck.

== Cast ==
- Jamie Bell as Jarhead Earl
- Frank Grillo as Chainsaw Angus
- James Badge Dale as Whalen
- Margaret Qualley as Delia Angus
- Chris Browning as McGill
- Adam Bartley as Dote
- James Landry Hébert as Poe
- Pat Healy as Eldon
- Alexander Washburn as Moses
- David Myers Gregory as Purcell

== Production ==
In May 2017, it was announced Tim Sutton would write and direct the film, based upon the novel of the same name by Frank Bill. David Lancaster and Stephanie Wilcox will serve as producers on the film, under their Rumble Films and BackUp Media banners, respectively. The Jokers will co-produce and distribute the film in France. In October 2017, it was announced Jamie Bell, Frank Grillo, James Badge Dale, Margaret Qualley and Chris Browning had been cast in the film.

Interviewed by Amy Taubin for Film Comment, Tim Sutton said, "Where the movie comes from for me is a combination of early Malick, the end of Taxi Driver, and Apocalypse Now".

=== Filming ===
Principal photography began on October 23, 2017, in Cincinnati, Ohio.

== Release ==
It had its world premiere at the Toronto International Film Festival on September 7, 2018. Shortly after, IFC Films acquired U.S. distribution rights to the film. It also screened at Fantastic Fest on September 21, 2018. It was released on February 15, 2019.

== Reception ==
On Rotten Tomatoes the film has an approval rating of 39% based on 46 reviews, with an average rating of 5.5/10. The website's critical consensus reads: "Donnybrook has a solid cast and noble intentions, but they're overwhelmed by surface storytelling and unrelentingly grim violence." On Metacritic, the film holds a rating of 53 out of 100, based on reviews from 15 critics, indicating "mixed or average" reviews.

Keith Uhlich of The Hollywood Reporter described the mix of Malick, Scorsese, and Faulkner influences as "repellent", "a movie to which the term "derivative" entirely applies", adding "the lurid shock/schlock of William Faulkner in Sanctuary mode." Peter Debruge of Variety magazine praised director Tim Sutton, "Donnybrook marks a major step forward in both ambition and style."
