= Bob Clendenin =

American actor

- Born: Robert Treman Clendenin; April 14, 1964 (age 62); Newark, Ohio, U.S.
- Occupation: Actor
- Years active: 1988–present
- Spouses: Greer Shephard (m. 1995; div. 1998) Erin Fiedler (m. 2001)
- Children: 2

Robert Treman Clendenin (born April 14, 1964) is an American actor. He is best known for portraying Dr. Tom Gazelian in ABC comedy series Cougar Town and Dr. Paul Zeltzer in the comedy series Scrubs.

== Education ==
Clendenin graduated from Cornell University in 1986 and earned his Master of Fine Arts from Penn State University in 1990. He has subsequently built an acting career defined by roles as oddball characters in TV and film.

== Career ==
He has played more than 110 roles in films, TV and web series.

=== Television career ===
He appeared on numerous shows including The Tick, Popular, Charmed (3x10), Will & Grace, The New Adventures of Old Christine, Ugly Betty, Felicity, Weeds, Gilmore Girls, NYPD Blue, Desperate Housewives, The League, Space: Above and Beyond, Roswell, The Middle, Mixed-ish. He appeared as a Vidiian surgeon on Star Trek: Voyager, Earl on That '70s Show, Slow Roger on My Name Is Earl, drug dealer Jamie DeBell on Netflix's Longmire, Grimm, and on several episodes of The Closer.

He has appeared on many of John Lehr's shows including Quick Draw, Jailbait, and TBS' 10 Items or Less, where he played main character Carl Dawson.

He had recurring roles on three Bill Lawrence shows: Scrubs, Cougar Town, and Bad Monkey (and appeared in a cross-over between the former two on Cougar Town). On Cougar Town he played Tom, a comedically bizarre neighbor who has a crush on the main character, Jules Cobb (Courteney Cox). After recurring on show for five seasons, he was upgraded to the regular cast in season six.

Clendenin also played the role of the town undertaker Vernon Shank in the Hulu original series Quick Draw.

=== Film career ===
His films include Kazaam, L.A. Confidential, Moonlight Mile, Dude, Where's My Car?, where he played one of the space nerds, the 2009 film Star Trek, where he appeared as a ship yard worker who interacts with Kirk, Wish I Was Here, and Paul Blart 2.

=== Other work ===
Clendenin appeared in the 2011 Rockstar Games video game LA Noire as Irwin Bousman.

Clendenin has also appeared in commercials for Jack In The Box, GoDaddy, Progressive, and State Farm. He starred as devil-may-care Ted in the 2008 film short Daryl From OnCar. This short was produced for WGA-affiliated StrikeTV, a site created to benefit crew affected by the writer's strike of Nov. 5, 2007 - Feb. 12, 2008.

== Selected filmography ==
=== Film ===
- Kazaam (1996) as Stage Manager
- L.A. Confidential (1997) as Reporter at Hollywood Station
- Dude, Where's My Car? (2000) as Zarnoff
- Moonlight Mile (2002) as Server #1
- Race to Witch Mountain (2009) as Lloyd
- Star Trek (2009) as Shipyard Worker
- Wish I Was Here (2014) as Defense Attorney
- Paul Blart: Mall Cop 2 (2015) as Murhtelle
- Babylon (2022) as Otto's assistant director
- LaRoy, Texas (2023) as Ben Finney

=== TV ===
- Caroline in the City (1998–1999) as Dave (3 episodes)
- Felicity (1998–2002) as Mr. Norman (5 episodes)
- Popular (1999–2001) as Godfrey (8 episodes)
- That '70s Show (2000–2001) as Earl (3 episodes)
- 3rd Rock From The Sun (2001) as Man #1 (Credited as Rober Clendenin) (1 episode)
- Scrubs (2002–2009) as Dr. Paul Selzer (7 episodes)
- Desperate Housewives (2005) as Louis (1 episode)
- The Closer (2005–2009) as Dr. Terrence (6 episodes)
- Nobody's Watching (2006) as Roy Ingold (unaired pilot)
- Monk (2006) as Gerald Vengal (1 episode)
- 10 Items or Less (2006–2009) as Carl Dawson (21 episodes)
- My Name Is Earl (2007–2008) as Slow Roger (3 episodes)
- Cougar Town (2010–2015) as Dr. Tom Gazelian (64 episodes)
- Newsreaders (2013) as Roscoe Thurnpike (1 episode)
- The Exes (2015) as Arnie (1 episode)
- Dr. Ken (2016) as Mr. Hubert (1 episode)
- Mixed-ish (2020) as Principal Taylor (2 episodes)
- The Neighborhood (2021) as Stan (1 episode)
- Reboot (2022) as Dougie (1 episode)
- Bad Monkey (2024) as KJ Claspers
- Bookie (2024) as Gregory
