= Americana (2023 film) =

- Theatrical release poster
- Directed by: Tony Tost
- Written by: Tony Tost
- Produced by: Alex Saks
- Starring: Sydney Sweeney; Paul Walter Hauser; Halsey; Simon Rex; Eric Dane; Zahn McClarnon
- Cinematography: Nigel Bluck
- Edited by: Peter McNulty
- Music by: David Fleming
- Production companies: Bron Studios; Saks Picture Company
- Distributed by: Lionsgate
- Release dates: March 17, 2023 (SXSW); August 15, 2025 (United States)
- Running time: 107 minutes
- Country: United States
- Language: English
- Budget: $9 million
- Box office: ~$500,000

Americana is a 2023 American crime thriller film written and directed by Tony Tost in his film debut. It stars Sydney Sweeney, Paul Walter Hauser, Halsey, Eric Dane, Zahn McClarnon, and Simon Rex.

With filming taking place in New Mexico in 2022, the film premiered at the 2023 South by Southwest Film & TV Festival. Lionsgate acquired distribution rights and theatrically released Americana on August 15, 2025. It received generally positive reviews from critics.

== Plot ==
Cal Starr, a young boy living in a small South Dakota town, develops an obsession with Native American culture after watching numerous Western films on television and comes to believe he is the reincarnation of Lakota leader Sitting Bull. One day, after purchasing his own bow and arrows, he returns home to find his troubled sister Mandy has attacked her abusive boyfriend Dillon MacIntosh and is about to flee in Dillon's car with a $1,000,000 Lakota ghost shirt Dillon had stolen. Mandy tries to take Cal with her, but he refuses, believing he needs to be reunited with "his people". As Mandy leaves, Dillon recovers and exits the house, only for Cal to kill him with the bow and arrows.

Days earlier, down-on-his-luck military veteran Lefty Ledbetter befriends stuttering waitress Penny Jo Poplin, who dreams of country music stardom. While working, Penny Jo finds a note on a napkin revealing the date and time of a meeting in the diner concerning a large sum of money. Hoping to send Penny to Nashville, Lefty eavesdrops on the meeting. The meeting turns out to be between Western antiquities dealer Roy Lee Dean and Dillon and his associate Fun Dave. Roy, who sells stolen Native American artifacts on the black market, hires Dillon and Fun Dave to steal the Lakota ghost shirt from a wealthy local man named Pendleton Duvall.

Dillon and Fun Dave break into Duvall's house, kill him and several of his house guests before fleeing with the shirt. In the process, Dillon learns from Pendleton that the Ghost Shirt is worth much more money than Dillon assumed. When Fun Dave begins to grieve over the killings and panic about stealing a Native American artefact, Dillon murders him with a screwdriver and drives away with the shirt whilst being unknowingly followed by Lefty and Penny. Dillon returns home and announces his intention to Mandy for the two of them to embark on a new life after they sell the Ghost Shirt. Mandy instead strikes him in the head with a hammer, leading to the events of the opening scene.

Lefty and Penny follow Mandy to Wyoming, where Mandy, having nowhere else to go, returns to her father Hiram's well-armed wooded compound. Hiram is revealed to be a radical patriarch who treats his wife and daughters as servants and allows Mandy to stay with him only if she abides by his house rules, to which she reluctantly agrees. Cal encounters a militant local Native American group led by a Marxist radical named Ghost Eye and attempts to convince them that he is Sitting Bull's reincarnation, in the process revealing the location of the ghost shirt. The group, eager to retrieve the Ghost Shirt from non-Native hands and return it to their people, leave for Wyoming with Cal in tow. Once they arrive there, one of their members strikes Penny Jo and they take her hostage as a bargaining chip.

At the Starr compound, Lefty tries to spy on the house but is shot and mortally wounded by Hiram. The Native American radical group arrives minutes later and begin shooting arrows into the house, killing Hiram and other Starr men while Mandy convinces her mother and sisters to arm themselves and fight back. After the Starr women kill the rest of the men in the compound, both the women and the Native American sides agree to a ceasefire. Mandy reveals to the gang that she has arranged for Roy to pick up the ghost shirt at the compound. Mandy and Ghost Eye strike a deal to ambush and kill Roy, allowing Mandy to procure his money and Ghost Eye to retrieve the ghost shirt.

At nightfall, Roy Lee arrives at the compound but the plan goes awry when he notices Lefty, still alive and attempts to shoot him. Penny Jo, to save Lefty, fires her gun to distract Roy Lee, in the process accidentally reveals the gang's presence. This results in a Western style standoff between Roy Lee, the Native Group and the Starr women. Eventually a shootout begins during which Mandy is wounded and the Native American group is killed except for Ghost Eye, who gains the upper hand and kills Roy Lee. In the chaos, Penny Jo retrieves Roy's money and splits it between her and Mandy's family before fleeing with Lefty and Cal, who now has the Ghost Shirt. Mandy is taken to the hospital by her mother and sisters.

Cal has Penny Jo and Lefty drop him off at the Native American group's headquarters. When Ghost Eye returns, Cal gives him the shirt and Ghost Eye thanks him, though still shuts him out as he is not a true Native American. Lefty succumbs to his wounds and proposes marriage to Penny Jo before dying, devastating her. Mandy quietly sneaks out of the hospital following her treatment and happily reunites with Cal back in town while an emotionally ravaged Penny begins her drive to Nashville, singing a Dolly Parton song without a trace of her stammer.

== Cast ==
- Sydney Sweeney as Penny Jo Poplin
- Paul Walter Hauser as Lefty Ledbetter
- Halsey as Mandy Starr
- Simon Rex as Roy Lee Dean
- Toby Huss as Pendleton Duvall
- Eric Dane as Dillon MacIntosh
- Zahn McClarnon as Ghost Eye
- Gavin Maddox Bergman as Cal Starr
- Joe Adler as Fun Dave
- Derek Hinkey as Hank Spears
- Harriet Sansom Harris as Tish
- Donald Cerrone as Sheriff Cole Pickering

== Production ==
In February 2022, Sydney Sweeney, Paul Walter Hauser, Halsey, Simon Rex, Gavin Maddox Bergman, Harriet Sansom Harris, Derek Hinkey, Eric Dane, Zahn McClarnon and Donald Cerrone joined the cast of the film, then titled National Anthem, with Tony Tost directing from a screenplay he wrote. Principal photography began in February 2022, in New Mexico.

== Release ==
Americana had its world premiere at the 2023 South by Southwest Film & TV Festival on March 17, 2023. In March 2024, Lionsgate acquired worldwide distribution rights to the film. The film was theatrically released on August 15, 2025. It was originally scheduled to be released on August 22, 2025.

== Reception ==
=== Box office ===
In the United States and Canada, Americana was released alongside Nobody 2, and grossed around $500,000 from 1,100 theaters in its opening weekend. The Hollywood Reporter speculated whether the "media firestorm" surrounding Sydney Sweeney's American Eagle jeans campaign weeks prior the film's release had negatively affected box office returns.

=== Critical response ===
On the review aggregator website Rotten Tomatoes, 62% of 68 critics' reviews are positive, with an average rating of 6.2/10. The website's consensus reads: "Americana blends gritty charm, compelling performances, and cultural resonance, but its lack of narrative focus and inconsistent execution keep it from fully realizing its potential." Metacritic, which uses a weighted average, assigned the film a score of 61 out of 100, based on 16 critics, indicating "generally favorable" reviews.

For Deadline, Valerie Complex wrote, "Tost's direction manages to avoid the common pitfalls first-time directors encounter by overcomplicating things, but the director keeps it simple by letting characters work within their frame. ... This movie wouldn't be what it is without its rich and enjoyable cast — with Halsey and McClarnon being the standouts — of individuals who are determined, intelligent, uproarious and have different ideas of success and how to achieve it." Rafael Motamayor of IndieWire gave it a B+, writing, "A charming, Tarantino-esque heist film, ... [it] is clearly a homage to the [Western] genre and all its sides, both good and bad. The director shoots the vast arid landscapes and secluded rural roads of middle America with a melancholic eye, capturing the iconography of the genre while contemplating whether it still has a place in cinema today. With a film like this now in its arsenal, it surely does."

== See also ==
- Tarantinoesque film
