= Tony Tost =

American poet, critic and screenwriter (born 1975)

- Born: July 27, 1975 (age 51); Springfield, Missouri, U.S.
- Education: Green River Community College; College of the Ozarks; University of Arkansas; Duke University
- Occupations: Film director, poet, screenwriter, producer
- Writing career
- Genres: Poetry; Rural crime Neo-western

Tony Tost (born July 27, 1975) is an American film director, poet, critic and screenwriter. He is the creator, executive producer, and showrunner of Damnation, a neo-western period drama about the labor wars in America during the 1930s that aired on USA Network and on Netflix outside the US. He is also the writer and director of Americana, a 2023 neo-western crime drama from Lionsgate, and the showrunner for the second season of the mystery show Poker Face on Peacock.

== Early life ==
Tost was born in Springfield, Missouri and grew up in a series of single and double-wide trailers in and around Enumclaw, Washington. His parents were the day and night custodians at his elementary school and were the president and secretary of their labor union. Before becoming a writer, Tost began working full-time at the age of fifteen, working fast food and retail jobs, in a pickle factory, cleaning hotels and condos, washing dishes, and janitorial work.

He is a graduate of both Green River Community College in Auburn, Washington and College of the Ozarks in Point Lookout, Missouri. After his undergraduate education, Tost graduated with a Master of Fine Arts degree in Creative Writing from the University of Arkansas. He then completed a Ph.D. in English from Duke University, writing his dissertation on the poetics of innovative modernists such as Ezra Pound and Gertrude Stein.

== Career ==
=== Poetry and criticism ===
Tost's first poetry book Invisible Bride won the 2003 Walt Whitman Award judged by C.D. Wright. His second poetry book Complex Sleep was published by the University of Iowa Press in 2007. Publishers Weekly wrote "Tost's work synthesizes 20th-century avant-garde strategies, from Objectivist and Black Mountain poetics through language writing and conceptual poetry, with nods to Emerson and deconstruction."

In 2011, Tost's book on Johnny Cash's American Recordings was published by Continuum Books in their 33 1/3 series on classic albums. Critic Joshua Scheiderman wrote that Tost's book "ultimately belongs in the long, rich tradition of texts like Constance Rourke's American Humor: A Study of the National Character (1931) and Greil Marcus's The Old, Weird America: The World of Bob Dylan's Basement Tapes (1997), ostensibly academic studies of American culture but also works of mythopoesis in their own right."

Tost was the founding editor of the online poetry magazine Fascicle and previously a co-editor and co-founder, with Zachary Schomburg, of Octopus Magazine. His poems and essays have appeared in the literary journals Fence, Hambone, Talisman, Mandorla, No: a journal of the arts, Denver Quarterly, Typo, American Literature, Jacket, Verse, Open Letter and elsewhere.

=== Film and television ===
Tost was a writer and producer on the A&E and later Netflix television series Longmire. One of Tost's Longmire episodes, called "Chrysalis," received the Bronze Wrangler from the National Cowboy & Western Heritage Museum to honor the top works in Western music, film, television and literature.

His script "The Olympian" about Brad Alan Lewis's quest for the 1984 Olympics was selected for the 2016 Black List ranking of the film industry's best unproduced screenplays.

Tost created the TV series Damnation, which debuted November 2017 on USA Network and on Netflix outside the US. According to Tost, "I wanted to come up with a pulpy story about America that had big, operatic backstories for the characters and big gestures and unexpected little grace notes. I was inspired by everything from the westerns of Sam Peckinpah, Clint Eastwood, John Ford, Howard Hawks, Budd Boetticher, James Mangold, Quentin Tarantino, the Coens, and Sergio Leone; to samurai films like Yojimbo and 13 Assassins and Lady Snowblood; to grimy 1970s crime films like Charley Varrick, Prime Cut, Night Moves, and Walking Tall; to crime novels by Dashiell Hammett, Jim Thompson, James Ellroy, James Crumley. Thematically, my big inspirations are my artistic heroes Johnny Cash and Merle Haggard."

Tost was nominated for a 2020 WGA Award for his work on the second season of The Terror on AMC.

Tost's first film as a writer-director, Americana, wrapped filming in early 2022 and stars Sydney Sweeney, Halsey, Paul Walter Hauser, Zahn McClarnon, Eric Dane, and Simon Rex. It debuted at the South By Southwest film festival on March 17, 2023, to positive reviews. The Hollywood Reporter wrote, "Tost incorporates the wide-open spaces, cultural conflicts and endemic lawlessness typical to Westerns, while inverting conventional expectations by foregrounding Native American perspectives on some of the film's thornier social issues." Critic Simon Thompson added, "With calm confidence and a natural balance, writer-director Tony Tost strikes gold with this darkly comic crime thriller that hits every target it aims for. It's an example of the genre that should if there is any justice, be held up as an example of exactly how to do it."

Tost is the showrunner for the second season of the mystery show Poker Face on Peacock.

Tost currently lives in Los Angeles, California.

== Bibliography ==
- Invisible Bride (2004)
- World Jelly (2005)
- Complex Sleep (2007)
- Johnny Cash's American Recordings (criticism, 2011)

== Filmography ==
| Year | Title | Notes | Distributor |
|---|---|---|---|
| 2012–2016 | Longmire | writer (15 episodes), co-producer (10 episodes), producer (10 episodes) | A&E/Netflix |
| 2017–2018 | Damnation | writer (4), creator, showrunner, executive producer | USA Network/Netflix |
| 2019 | The Terror | writer (2), co-executive producer, WGA nominee | AMC |
| 2025 | Americana | writer, director (feature directorial debut) | Lionsgate |
| 2025 | Poker Face | writer (1), showrunner, executive producer | Peacock |
