= Longmire (TV series) =

2012 US neo-Western crime drama television series

- Title card
- Genre: Crime drama; Neo-Western
- Based on: Walt Longmire Mysteries by Craig Johnson
- Developed by: John Coveny; Hunt Baldwin
- Starring: Robert Taylor; Katee Sackhoff; Lou Diamond Phillips; Adam Bartley; Cassidy Freeman; Bailey Chase; Ally Walker
- Country of origin: United States
- Original language: English
- No. of seasons: 6
- No. of episodes: 63 (list of episodes)

Production
- Executive producers: John Coveny; Hunt Baldwin; Christopher Chulack; Greer Shephard; Michael M. Robin
- Production location: New Mexico
- Running time: 42–71 minutes
- Production companies: Warner Horizon Television; The Shephard/Robin Company; Two Boomerangs Productions

Original release
- Network: A&E
- Release: June 3, 2012 – August 4, 2014
- Network: Netflix
- Release: September 10, 2015 – November 17, 2017

Longmire is an American neo-Western crime drama television series that premiered on June 3, 2012, on the A&E network, developed by John Coveny and Hunt Baldwin. The series is based on the Walt Longmire Mysteries series of novels by Craig Johnson. It centers on Walt Longmire, a sheriff in Wyoming. He is assisted by staff, friends, and his daughter in investigating major crimes within his jurisdiction.

Longmire became the "highest-rated original drama series" on A&E; however, the network announced in August 2014 that it would not renew the series after the third season. Warner Horizon Television offered it to other networks and Netflix picked it up, starting with season four. Netflix released the sixth and final season on November 17, 2017. It is no longer available for streaming via Netflix in the United States, but is available on a number of other streaming services.

== Plot ==
Walt Longmire (Australian actor Robert Taylor) is the sheriff of fictional Absaroka County in Wyoming. Sheriff Longmire's longtime friend Henry Standing Bear (Lou Diamond Phillips), a member of the Cheyenne tribe, provides insight to and sometimes aids in dealing with tribal police. (The Indian reservation has its own police force, which has authority within the reservation boundaries, except for capital crimes.) As the series progresses, the friends deal with gambling at a casino on the reservation, competing jurisdictional authority for protecting people and prosecuting crimes, and other issues of contemporary Native American life.

=== Season one ===
Walt's adult daughter Cady (Cassidy Freeman) is concerned that her father has been stuck since the death of her mother. While preparing to run for re-election, Walt has delegated most police duties to deputies Branch Connally (Bailey Chase) and "The Ferg" (Adam Bartley). Branch has also entered the election, to unseat Longmire, and he is secretly dating Cady. Victoria "Vic" Moretti (Katee Sackhoff), a transplanted Philadelphia homicide detective, arrived in Wyoming six months prior and works as one of Walt's deputies.

In random flashback scenes, Walt and Henry travel separately to Denver, Colorado, where Walt attacks someone in a meth house. Denver Police Homicide Detective Fales (Charles S. Dutton) later comes to Wyoming to talk to Walt and Cady about Cady's mother's death. Cady is shocked to learn her mother was murdered, as Walt had told her she died of cancer. Fales tells Walt they found the murder suspect buried in a shallow grave. Walt denies killing the man, but Detective Fales suspects that if Walt did not commit the murder, then Henry did.

=== Season two ===
Cady goes to Denver to speak to Detective Fales, who gives her the details of her mother's murder and informs her the suspected murderer has also been killed. When Fales questions her, she says that her father confides in Henry Standing Bear, inadvertently giving Fales a new target of investigation. Henry tells Walt that he killed the murderer because Walt was unable to do so. Vic encounters Ed Gorski (Lee Tergesen), a retired cop from Philadelphia. They discuss the suicide of Gorski's former partner, whom Vic had implicated in a corruption scandal that prompted an internal-affairs investigation. Gorski blames Vic for his partner's death and begins to stalk her. Frightened by Gorski's manner, Vic asks Henry for help, and Walt visits Gorski to warn him away. Gorski is subsequently beaten severely. Hector (Jeffrey De Serrano), a Cheyenne mercenary believed to have assaulted Gorski, is protected by Walt. Henry confesses to Walt that he hired Hector to kill Miller Beck, the murderer of Walt's wife, but Hector explains that he did not kill the murderer, but only beat him and took his teeth as trophies. Fales and his team find the teeth at Henry's bar and arrest him. Walt wins the election. Cady is hospitalized after being hit by a car after hers is sabotaged. Branch investigates, leading to a confrontation with members of the local Cheyenne reservation, in which Branch is severely injured and calls Walt for help.

=== Season three ===
As Branch recovers from being shot, he comes to believe he was shot by David Ridges (David Midthunder), a Cheyenne who was thought to have died by suicide and been cremated. Walt and the others do not believe him, and he begins his own investigation. In prison, Henry is abused by other Native Americans, led by former Cheyenne reservation police chief Malachi Strand (Graham Greene). Strand believes Henry contributed to his arrest through his friendship with Walt. When Malachi makes it difficult for Henry to obtain an attorney, Cady decides to represent him. Henry gets released on bail and sets out to prove his innocence.

Malachi is also released and begins working as security for Jacob Nighthorse (A Martinez), a prominent Cheyenne businessman and developer. Both Branch and Henry uncover clues that point to Nighthorse's being involved in their cases, with Ridges as a key figure. Walt believes Nighthorse might have had a part in his wife's murder. He begins to believe that Branch is obsessed by his ideas about Ridges and suspends him temporarily, putting him in the care of his father Barlow (Gerald McRaney). Walt and Henry learn that Ridges killed Miller Beck. Walt learns of Ridges' hideout location and kills him in a confrontation, in self defense. Confronted by evidence that proves that Ridges, not Henry, killed Miller Beck, Fales is forced to drop all charges against Henry, but the investigations continue. Branch questions his father, who admits to having paid Nighthorse to hire Ridges to kill Walt's wife in hopes of helping Branch become sheriff. The season ends with the sound of a gunshot.

=== Season four ===
Walt, Vic, and Ferg set out to search for Branch, after finding a disturbing typewritten note on his home computer. Walt finds him dead in a river from what appears to be a self-inflicted shotgun wound. Walt finds soil in the shotgun shell, implying that the shell had been ejected after firing and replaced in the gun. Walt hence refuses to rule Branch's death a suicide, and begins thinking that Nighthorse is behind the murder. A drunken Barlow Connolly confesses to killing Branch. He commits suicide by cop trying to kill Walt. Afterward, Walt looks into hiring another deputy, Zach Heflin (Barry Sloane) to replace Branch. The department investigates the rape of a Cheyenne girl named Gabriella (Julia Jones) by a group of oil rig workers, but is unable to do anything. Henry, meanwhile, takes up Hector's role as avenger. When the rapists turn up dead, both Walt and the workers try to find the murderer, believed to be Gabriella or the new Hector. Walt begins spending time with his new love interest, Dr. Donna Monaghan (Ally Walker). Monaghan and Walt are attacked in his home, Walt is injured, and she is kidnapped.

=== Season five ===
Walt conducts an intense search for the person who kidnapped Donna after the home invasion and seriously wounded him. Walt and Donna continue their relationship. Nighthorse becomes increasingly suspicious of Malachi's activities, and suspects he is skimming at the casino or otherwise earning illegal money. Mathias (Zahn McClarnon), the chief of police on the Cheyenne Reservation, figures out that Henry has taken over Hector's duties as vigilante and uses that to his advantage. Archie (the Ferg) begins a relationship with a local nurse. A heroin operation by the Irish mob is discovered in Walt's jurisdiction. Uncovering who is selling heroin on the reservation leads Walt to arrest their local enforcer Eddie Harp (Dan Donohue). Archie is held up at gunpoint delivering Eddie to the FBI, traumatizing him. Walt defends a wrongful-death suit; if he loses, he will lose everything he owns, and probably his job. Vic learns she is pregnant, but is unsure if the father is her ex-boyfriend Eamonn (Josh Cooke) or Travis (Derek Phillips), Branch's childhood best friend with whom she had a drunken one-night stand. Walt ends his relationship with Donna. A future possibility of a relationship with Vic is suggested as they acknowledge their feelings toward each other. Chance (Peter Stormare) tells Vic where to find a murder weapon so that he can get the death sentence, but Vic gets assaulted recovering it. Walt travels to Boston to confront the head of the Irish Mafia, Shane Muldoon (Dylan Walsh), and tell him to stop selling heroin or else he will divulge Muldoon's identity to the FBI. Sometime later, a photo arrives for Walt from Shane showing Eddie dead. Tucker Baggett (Brett Rice), an attorney and close friend of Barlow Connally's, tells Walt that the real reason he is prosecuting the civil suit is so that he can bankrupt him and Barlow's real estate company can take over Walt's land for a 36-hole golf course. As Henry gives a ride home to a presumably drunk woman, Malachi and his men kidnap him. He is taken to a remote area of the neighboring Crow reservation, staked to the ground, and left to die.

=== Season six ===
In the first episode, Henry is still being held by kidnappers (led by Malachi) on the Crow reservation and might die if not found, but is finally freed by Walt with the help of the Crow medicine woman. Walt investigates a bank robbery with some unusual aspects. Based on the use of Jacob Nighthorse's wooden stakes in the Henry kidnapping, Walt still suspects Jacob of being behind Malachi, but due to Jacob's fear of Malachi, Henry arranges a reconciliation with Walt. As a result, Jacob agrees to present Malachi's "Red Pony" ledger to the FBI as proof that Malachi was using the Red Pony to syphon illegal profits. Walt discovers that Vic is pregnant. Walt starts his trial as does Chance, who pleads guilty and then engineers his escape. In finding Chance, Vic gets shot, and loses the baby. Another "Hector" appears, running Jacob and Henry off the road. Walt's civil trial goes badly, but the shooting of Tucker (who is also the attorney for the plaintiff) further complicates matters as Walt is immediately under suspicion. Vic attempts suicide. The death of former sheriff Lucian Connally (Peter Weller) (Walt's mentor and Barlow's brother) upsets Walt and makes him consider retirement. Jacob testifies to the collusion between Tucker Baggett and Barlow so that Walt's land can be taken and used for a golf course, revealing that despite their differences, he has a great deal of respect for Walt. As a result of emails that Jacob makes available, the civil suit is dropped. The death of Irish Mob enforcer Eddie Harp is revealed to have been staged, and he is discovered back selling heroin on the reservation. Walt remains unconvinced of Jacob's innocence, particularly after he confessed to having accepted funding from Shane Muldoon. Malachi kills Muldoon and then kidnaps Henry and Jacob to force Jacob to cede the deeds for the casino to him. Malachi and his men face a final showdown with Walt, Vic, Ferg, and the recently reinstated Zach Heflin, joined by Mathias' Cheyenne tribal police, ending with Walt killing Malachi and Henry killing Darius Burns (Joseph Daniel Havenstar), his second in command. Walt and Vic commence a relationship, as do Cady and Zach. Walt retires after convincing Cady to run for the job of sheriff. Walt leaves searching for the buried treasure that Lucian had convinced him that he had found, while Henry takes over Jacob's casino.

== Episodes ==
Season	Episodes	Originally released		
Season	Episodes	First released	Last released	Network
1	10	June 3, 2012	August 12, 2012	A&E
2	13	May 27, 2013	August 26, 2013	A&E
3	10	June 2, 2014	August 4, 2014	A&E
4	10	September 10, 2015		Netflix
5	10	September 23, 2016		Netflix
6	10	November 17, 2017		Netflix

== Cast and characters ==
=== Main ===
- Robert Taylor as Walt Longmire, the long-time sheriff of Absaroka County. His character is a throwback to the iconic heroes of classical Westerns, laconic and introspective, with a strong sense of duty and justice. As the stories build, Walt is shown to have a knack for finding the truth behind the various crimes that have been committed. His wife died a year before the series started, and he has told his daughter and friends that she died of cancer. Walt's grief leads to isolation and guilt.
- Katee Sackhoff as Victoria "Vic" Moretti, a sheriff's deputy and a former Philadelphia Police Department homicide detective. She moved to Wyoming with her husband Sean following an incident with her superior officer in Philadelphia. She has four brothers, and at least one sister.
- Lou Diamond Phillips as Henry Standing Bear, a Cheyenne who is Walt's best friend and closest confidant. Their friendship began when they met in the sixth grade. Henry owns and operates the Red Pony, a local tavern and restaurant. An expert tracker, his name is described as meaning "a bear who protects those whom he loves". Henry is initially treated as a minor character, but as the series goes on, his position as a well-respected member of his community becomes a prominent storyline, and he actively helps Walt and Cady on numerous occasions. Henry does not speak using contractions.
- Bailey Chase as Branch Connally, an ambitious deputy who comes from a wealthy local family. His uncle, Lucian Connally, was Walt's predecessor as sheriff, and Branch hopes to be sheriff one day, as well. He was romantically involved with Cady Longmire. After being shot by David Ridges in season two, he is shown during the next season recovering and investigating the attack. He was suspended from the force and murdered by his father Barlow at the end of season three.
- Cassidy Freeman as Cady Longmire, Walt's daughter, an attorney who initially works for a local law firm. Later, she works for Jacob Nighthorse, to provide representation to residents on the reservation. She was romantically involved with Branch Connally for a time. Later on, she becomes romantically involved with "Zach" Heflin. In the series finale, her father convinces her to run for sheriff.
- Adam Bartley as Archie "The Ferg" Ferguson, an awkward but hard-working young deputy, who felt unappreciated next to his more senior deputies, the handsome Branch Connally and the former Philadelphia detective Vic Moretti. His eclectic knowledge and skills have helped solve cases, justifying Walt's hiring him, despite the fact that one reason Walt hired him was as a favor to his father. He continues to feel overlooked, even when he is promoted to a more senior deputy status. In the early seasons, he has an unrequited crush on Cady. In season five, he meets Meg, a local nurse.

=== Recurring ===
- Louanne Stephens as Ruby, dispatcher and manager of the sheriff's office
- Zahn McClarnon as Chief Mathias, chief of the Cheyenne reservation's tribal police
- A Martinez as Jacob Nighthorse, a local Cheyenne businessman representing the interests of his people
- Bob Clendenin as Jamie DeBell (seasons 1, 3, 5–6), a nervous weed dealer, who has also worked a variety of low-paying legal jobs, such as a pizza delivery man and Uber driver, who occasionally gives Walt information about criminal activity
- Gerald McRaney as Barlow Connally (seasons 1–4), a wealthy, powerful, local, real-estate developer and Branch's father
- Peter Weller as Lucian Connally (seasons 1–4, 6), Branch's uncle, and Walt's predecessor as sheriff, who occasionally offers Walt advice and assistance
- John Bishop as Bob Barnes is the town drunk who has worked a variety of odd jobs. Despite his alcoholism frequently landing him in questionable situations, Bob is generally shown to have a good heart and occasionally helps Walt and the department with investigations. Walt sometimes demonstrates a big-brotherly affinity for Bob by chastising him when he falls off the wagon, but also by helping him when possible, including getting Bob a job at the local florist shop.
- Arron Shiver as Billy Barnes (seasons 1–2, 5), Bob's son
- Tom Wopat as Sheriff Jim Wilkins (seasons 1, 4–6), sheriff of neighboring Cumberland County
- Louis Herthum as Omar (seasons 1–3, 5) is a local hunting guide with expertise in firearms. Omar regularly flirts with Vic, to her dismay.
- Katherine LaNasa as Lizzie Ambrose (seasons 1–2), a wealthy local woman with whom Walt has a tentative romantic relationship
- Charles S. Dutton as Detective Fales (seasons 1–3) from Denver, investigating the suspicious death of the murderer of Walt's wife
- Michael Mosley as Sean Keegan (seasons 1–3), Vic's husband, natural gas company executive
- Jeffrey De Serrano as Hector (seasons 1–3, 6), Cheyenne ex-boxer who lives on the reservation, is a mercenary-for-hire, and vigilante for Cheyenne people who seek justice
- Irene Bedard as May Still Water (seasons 1, 3–4), Cheyenne woman who respects Walt and Henry
- Amber Midthunder as Lily Still Water (seasons 1, 3), May's daughter
- Q'orianka Kilcher as Ayasha Roundstone (season 1)
- Lee Tergesen as Ed Gorski (seasons 2–3), ex-cop from Philadelphia who worked with Vic. He was previously romantically involved with her but she broke off the relationship, and in the aftermath he chooses to stalk her.
- Derek Phillips as Travis Murphy (seasons 2–6), a boyhood friend of Branch Connally's, who aspires to be a sheriff's deputy
- Noam Jenkins as FBI Agent Towson (seasons 2, 5), a by-the-book agent seen by the sheriff's department as a negative force
- David Midthunder as David Ridges (seasons 2–3), a Cheyenne man who shoots Branch and becomes a fugitive
- Ralph Alderman as Judge Joseph Mayhew (seasons 3–6), the judge presiding over the trials of Henry Standing Bear and Chance Gilbert
- T. J. Alvarado as Dillon (seasons 3–5), the doctor at the reservation clinic
- Joseph Daniel Havenstar as Darius Burns (seasons 3–6), Malachi Strand's right-hand man
- Graham Greene as Malachi Strand (seasons 3–6), the former chief of the tribal police and Nighthorse's chief of security at the casino
- Hank Cheyne as Sam Poteet (seasons 3–6), a Cheyenne White Warrior and sage
- Scott Michael Campbell as Dr. Weston (seasons 3–6), a doctor at the regional hospital who occasionally assists in Longmire's investigations
- Nick Gehlfuss as Cameron Maddox (season 3), a lawyer who went to law school with Cady, who helps her try to prove Henry's innocence
- Patricia Bethune as Mary Jo Murphy (seasons 3–5), Travis' mother
- Peter Stormare as Chance Gilbert (seasons 3, 5–6), the leader of an anti-government movement who is both insane and very intelligent. He kidnaps Vic and her husband after their car breaks down. He only appears in six episodes, but becomes a major villain.
- Josh Cooke as Eamonn O'Neill (seasons 4–5), a deputy from Cumberland County who fills in briefly at the sheriff's department
- Barry Sloane as Zachary "Zach" Heflin (seasons 4, 6), a new deputy hired by Walt, who later becomes romantically involved with Cady
- Julia Jones as Gabriella Langton (season 4), a Cheyenne girl who is raped
- Ally Walker as Dr. Donna Monaghan (seasons 4–5), a therapist treating local veterans, who becomes a love interest of Walt's
- Tantoo Cardinal as Marilyn Yarlott (seasons 4–6), a Crow hunter and medicine woman who lives alone in the vast wilderness of the Crow reservation
- Callum Keith Rennie as Walker Browning (seasons 4–5), the manager of a regional energy company, whom Walt suspects of criminal activity
- Tamara Duarte as Mandy Plitt (seasons 4–6), a young Cheyenne woman hired by Cady Longmire to assist her in the legal-aid office on the Cheyenne reservation
- Stephen Louis Grush as Monte Ford (seasons 4–5), a young man who applies to be a sheriff's deputy. After Zach is selected, Monte responds angrily and follows Zach around to annoy him.
- Currie Graham as Kevin Morris (seasons 4–6), Jacob Nighthorse's lawyer
- Lew Temple as Archer Loftus (season 4), a worker with the regional energy company run by Walker Browning, he is also a conspiracy theorist.
- Mary Wiseman as Meg (seasons 5–6), a nurse at the local hospital who begins dating the Ferg
- Eric Ladin as Mayor Sawyer Crane (seasons 5–6), the ambitious mayor of Durant, Wyoming
- Brett Rice as Tucker Baggett (seasons 5–6), a lawyer and wannabe real estate tycoon who is a close friend of Barlow Connally's
- Dylan Walsh as Shane Muldoon (seasons 5–6), the leader of the Irish Mafia
- Dan Donohue as Eddie Harp (seasons 5–6), a drug dealer affiliated with the Irish Mafia
- Patch Darragh as Dave Milgrom (seasons 5–6), Walt's lawyer
- Raphael Sbarge as Agent Decker (season 6), a corrupt FBI agent with ties to Muldoon and Malachi
- Marylouise Burke as Beverly Joyce (season 6), Meg's mother
- Mike Pniewski as Judge Clarence Drood (season 6), the judge presiding over Walt's civil suit

== Development and production ==
Longmire received a pilot order on December 14, 2010. The pilot was written by John Coveny and Hunt Baldwin, and directed by Christopher Chulack. Coveny, Baldwin, and Chulack serve as executive producers alongside Greer Shephard, Michael M. Robin, and the production companies Warner Horizon Television and the Shephard/Robin Company. The series is an adaptation of the Longmire mystery novels written by best-selling author Craig Johnson.

The story is set in northern Wyoming, but the series was filmed in several locations in New Mexico, including Santa Fe, Eagle Nest, Espanola, Red River, Las Vegas, Lamy, Pecos and the Valles Caldera. Buffalo, in Johnson County, in northeast Wyoming, is the setting for some scenes set in the fictional town of Durant, county seat of Absaroka.

Casting announcements began in February 2011, with Robert Taylor cast first in the lead role of Sheriff Walt Longmire. Katee Sackhoff, Bailey Chase, Cassidy Freeman, and Lou Diamond Phillips followed, with Sackhoff cast in the role of Victoria "Vic" Moretti, Chase cast as Branch Connally, Freeman cast as Cady Longmire, and Phillips cast as Henry Standing Bear.

On August 26, 2011, A&E picked up the series for a 10-episode first season. A&E renewed it for a second season on June 29, 2012, following early success as the highest-rated summer scripted drama debut, and as A&E's highest-rated scripted drama. The network renewed it for a third season on November 25, 2013.

In 2013, massive wildfires scorched the Valles Caldera National Preserve, which disrupted the series production. Three fires started over a three-week period, two at the same time. The Prescott Fire Department's Granite Mountain Hotshots assisted in preventing the destruction of the area around where Walt's house is filmed. Nineteen of the Hotshots' 20 members were later killed battling the 2013 Yarnell Hill Fire in Arizona. The second season's finale honored them in the closing credits.

Production for the third season began in early 2014. Filming of the interiors took place in New Mexico at Garson Studios, on the campus of Santa Fe University of Art and Design. According to the New Mexico State Film Office, exteriors were filmed in and around Santa Fe and at Garson Studios.

On August 28, 2014, A&E announced that Longmire was cancelled after completing its third season, despite consistently strong viewership that made it "the most-watched original series in A&E history, packing almost 6 million viewers" per episode. The decision was made "reportedly because it appealed to an older demographic that was unappealing to advertisers" and was produced by an external studio.

Three months later, Netflix confirmed that it had picked up the series (based, in contrast to A&E, on its strong appeal to a specific segment of the audience) and would film additional episodes. The 10-episode fourth season filmed on location in New Mexico, and was made available for viewing in North America and Oceania on September 10, 2015.

On October 30, 2015, Netflix announced that Longmire would return for a fifth season. Season-five location filming was scheduled for late March to late June, 2016. It took place primarily in Las Vegas, New Mexico, and the town is shown in the series. Other locations included towns in the surrounding area. The studio work was completed at Garson Studios at Santa Fe University of Art and Design. The 10-episode fifth season was made available for viewing on September 23, 2016.

According to Eric Witt, director of the Santa Fe Film Office, season-six filming was scheduled to begin in March 2017. By June, the interior scenes had been filmed at Garson Studios; location photography was underway in various New Mexico locations including Santa Fe, Las Vegas, Valles Caldera, Pecos, and other sites in the northern part of the state. The director was T.J. Scott and the producers included Hunt Baldwin, John Coveny, Greer Shephard, and Michael M. Robin. Filming concluded the last week of June.

== Release ==
=== Broadcast ===
Longmire began airing in the United Kingdom on TCM, on March 17, 2013, at 9 pm, in Australia on GEM on May 15, 2013, at 9:30 pm. Season two began airing in Australia on July 31, 2013, and in Italy on Rete 4 on July 4, 2013, at 9 pm.

The sixth and final season began airing on TCM in the UK, on January 7, 2018.

The series is shown in Ireland on RTÉ One and in Germany on RTL Nitro, as of January 10, 2014, at 10:05 pm. It made its Canadian debut in English, in January 2014 on APTN, and in French on May 26, 2014, on Séries+. International broadcasters retain the rights to new Netflix-commissioned seasons of the show until their licenses expire.

=== Home media ===
The first season of Longmire was released on May 28, 2013. It featured a documentary about filming in New Mexico, when the setting is in Wyoming, a gallery of photographic stills, and some unaired scenes. The second season was released on May 13, 2014. The three-disc set included an extended directors' cut version of the seventh episode, "Sound and Fury", as well as the season finale, "Bad Medicine". A bonus featurette, "Testing Courage: The Storm Defines the Man", was also included. The third season, including a bonus featurette, "The Ghost in the Storm", was released on March 3, 2015. The first three seasons were added to Netflix in the United States in June 2015. The fourth season was released on September 16, 2016, in a three-disc, 10-episode set. The Blu-ray releases of the series were handled by the Warner Archive Collection. A 21-disc Blu-ray set titled Longmire: The Complete Series was released on February 14, 2023 from Warner Bros.

== Reception ==
=== Ratings ===
Longmire debuted as A&E's number-one original-series premiere with 4.1 million total viewers.

Viewership and ratings per season of Longmire
Season	Timeslot (ET)	Episodes	First aired		Last aired		Avg. viewers (millions)
Season	Timeslot (ET)	Episodes	Date	Viewers (millions)	Date	Viewers (millions)	Avg. viewers (millions)
1	Sunday 10:00pm	10	June 3, 2012	4.15	August 12, 2012	4.34	TBD
2	Monday 10:00pm	13	May 27, 2013	4.31	August 26, 2013	4.42	TBD
3	Monday 10:00pm	10	June 2, 2014	3.86	August 4, 2014	3.68	TBD

=== Critical reception ===
In its first season, Nancy DeWolf Smith of The Wall Street Journal called the series "the best of two worlds: a modern crime drama with dry wit and sometimes heart-wrenching emotion that's also got a glorious setting under the big sky of Wyoming." She added, "If it weren't for a few modern conveniences, like cellphones and trucks, it might as well be 1875, so rugged and unspoiled does the scenery look." Newsday's Verne Gay stated, "Longmire arrives as silently as a dust devil kicked up by a high wind on the Wyoming plains. With little in the way of fanfare and a lead actor unacquainted with household name status, it must instead rely on a quiet fortitude, much like its namesake." He added, "Unassuming Longmire doesn't shout 'Love Me!' but instead works its charms subtly, quietly. There's promise here." Alan Sepinwall of HitFix said of season one, "there's a sense of place to the show that makes it feel unlike every other cop show on television", and he would "like to see the mysteries grow more engaging as the series moves along, but Longmire at least starts with a good foundation in Walt, his sidekicks, and the wide, open spaces they travel."

The San Francisco Chronicle's David Wiegand was critical, writing that the series "has the look and feel of a show cooked up by a bunch of bored TV industry types while they were waiting for the valet to bring their car to them at the Beverly Hills Chuck E. Cheese." He added, "There's very little drama, and the pilot episode lumbers along like an overfed elk."

Three years later, after viewing the first three episodes of season four, Brian Tallerico wrote on the Roger Ebert site, "It sometimes sounds like faint praise to describe a series like you would a reliable car, but Longmire is just a sturdy show. It is well-constructed all around—confidently made, well-acted, and the writing is much smarter than many shows like it. It hums, each episode these three [sic] feeling more well-paced than the one before." At the same point in the series, Mike Hale of The New York Times also filed a favorable review, with particular praise for actor Robert Taylor, described as a "modern-day Gary Cooper or Joel McCrea".

In the aggregate, Longmire received favorable reviews on Metacritic and Rotten Tomatoes. For example, season four received an average rating of 8.5/10 based on seven reviews on Rotten Tomatoes.

=== Accolades ===
In 2013, the pilot episode of Longmire, whose teleplay was written by Hunt Baldwin and John Coveny, was nominated for an Edgar Award by the Mystery Writers of America. The season-two episode, "Party's Over", was nominated by the Entertainment Industries Council for a PRISM Award for Best Drama Series Episode – Substance Use. Also in 2013, the series won the National Cowboy & Western Heritage Museum's Bronze Wrangler for Fictional Television Drama. The series won a Bronze Key Art Award for its season-two television advertisement, titled "The Oath".

In 2014, Steve La Porte was nominated for a Makeup Artists and Hairstylist Guild Award for Best Special Makeup Effects.

Over the years, the series has also received two Key Art Awards and two Red Nation Film Awards of Excellence, the latter for Supporting Actor A Martinez and Graham Greene.
