= Adam Bartley =

American actor

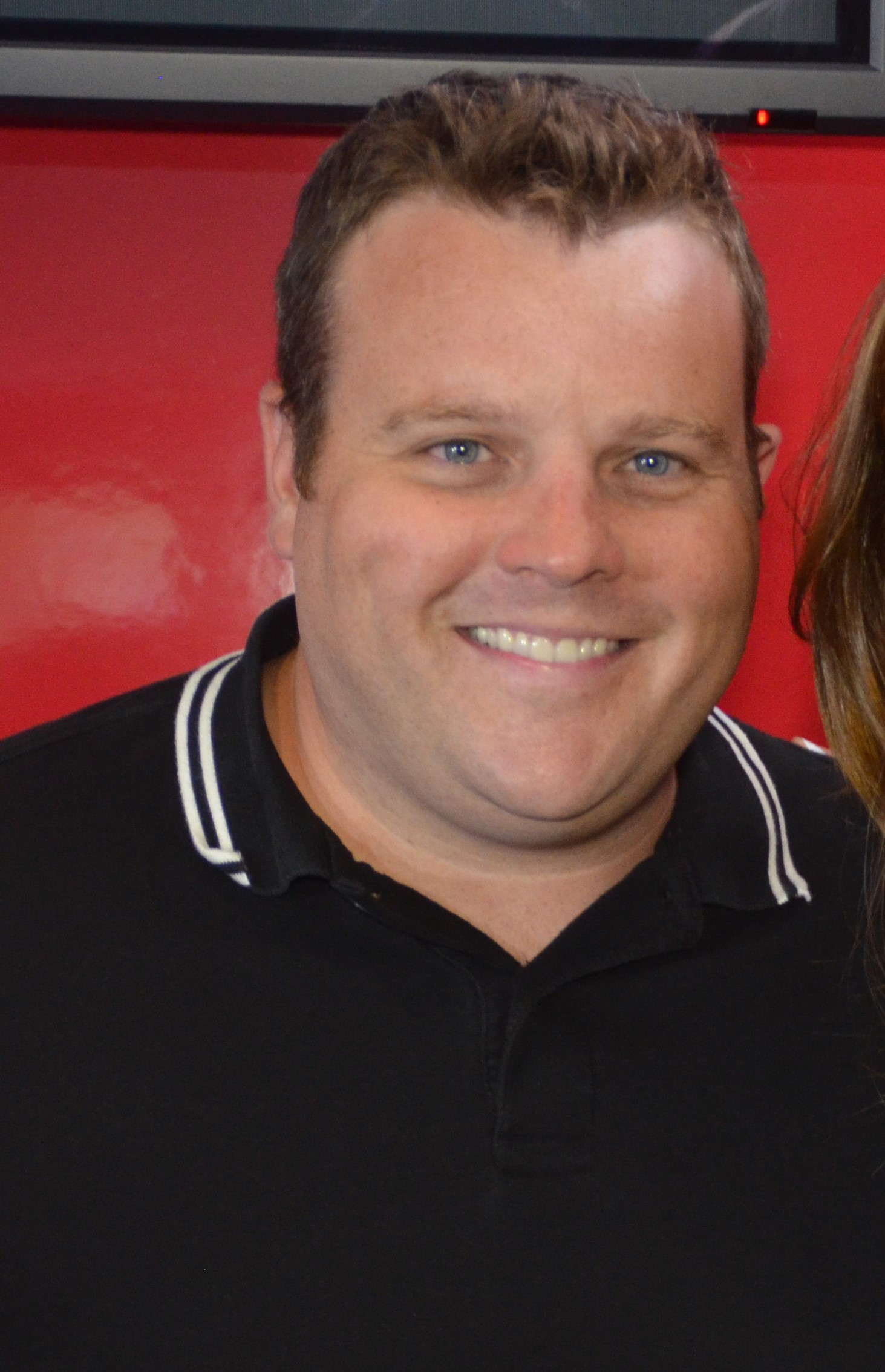
- Bartley in 2014
- Education: Southern Methodist University (BFA)
- Occupation: Actor
- Years active: 2011–present

Adam Bartley is an American actor. He is best known for his role as Sheriff's Deputy Archie "the Ferg" Ferguson on the A&E/Netflix crime television series Longmire (2012–2017).

== Life and career ==
Bartley is a 1997 graduate of Eden Prairie High School in Eden Prairie. In 2001, Bartley graduated from Southern Methodist University with a Bachelor of Fine Arts degree in acting. While in college, he worked at Reunion Arena during Dallas Mavericks basketball games.

After college, he lived in New York City, Chicago, Aspen, and Alaska, and acted in local theater productions while working as an acting teacher and coach. After moving to Los Angeles, he was selected for his first television pilot audition; it was for Longmire, and he won the role. His other television credits include parts on Justified, Bones, NCIS: Los Angeles, American Housewife, Lucifer, and This Is Us.

In 2022 Bartley had a recurring role on the Amazon Studios & Legendary Television sci-fi drama Night Sky. He has also appeared in several movies, including Kajillionaire, Vice, Donnybrook, Under the Silver Lake, Annabelle: Creation, and 2013's Armed Response.

== Personal life ==
In April 2015, Bartley was arrested in Santa Fe, New Mexico and charged with driving under the influence. Tests determined that his blood alcohol level was .09, just over the .08 legal limit.

== Filmography ==
=== Film ===
Year	Title	Role	Notes
2012	Be Strong	Escaped Convict	Short film
2012	Qwerty	Jim Wright	
2013	Armed Response	Driscoll	
2017	Annabelle: Creation	Officer Fuller	
2018	Under the Silver Lake	Officer McCoy	
2018	Donnybrook	Dote	
2018	Vice	Frank Luntz	
2020	Kajillionaire	Jacuzzi Salesman	
2020	Honestly Weekend	Harry Simon	
2020	Burning Dog	Five (voice)	

=== Television ===
Year	Title	Role	Notes
2011	1000 Ways to Die	Minuteman #1	Episode: "Getting a Rise from the Dead"
2011	Criminal Minds	Movie Buff #2	Episode: "The Stranger"
2011	Get Busy	Adam	
2011	Chuck	Stu	Episode: "Chuck Versus the Business Trip"
2012	Justified	Junior	Episode: "The Devil You Know"
2012–2017	Longmire	Archie "The Ferg" Ferguson	
2013	Vegas	Robbie Reuben	Episode: "Road Trip"
2014	Killer Women	Del Trevino	Episode: "Demons"
2014	Bones	Derek Kaplan	Episode: "The Money Maker on the Merry-Go-Round" (season 10 ep 7)
2014–2017	NCIS: Los Angeles	Carl Brown	
2016	Lucifer	Erik Doyle	Episode: "A Priest Walks Into a Bar"
2017	This Is Us	Duke	Episodes: "Three Sentences", "I Call Marriage", "Jack Pearson's Son"
2017	Doubt	Marcus Weeks	Episode: "Clean Burn"
2019	Love, Death & Robots	Sobieski (voice)	Episode: "Shape-Shifters"
2019	The Magicians	Golf	Episode: "No Better to Be Safe Than Sorry"
2020	All Rise	Barney Budge	Episode: "Prelude to a Fish"
2020	AJ and the Queen	Chris	Episode: "Little Rock"
2021	Call Me Kat	Steve	Episode: "Eggs"
2021	Snowfall	Officer Zinn	Episode: "Weight"
2022	Night Sky	Byron	
2022	Candy	Richard	
2023	Lessons in Chemistry	Scientist	
