= Jailbait (disambiguation) =

Jailbait is slang for a minor who is younger than the age of consent for sexual activity, with the implication that an older person might find them sexually attractive.

Jailbait or Jail Bait may also refer to:

== Film ==
- Jail Bait (1937 film), an American short film starring Buster Keaton
- Jail Bait (1954 film), an American film directed by Ed Wood
- Jail Bait (1972 film), a German TV film directed by Rainer Werner Fassbinder
- Jailbait (1994 film), an American film starring C. Thomas Howell
- Jail Bait, a 2000 TV film directed by Allan Moyle
- Jailbait (2004 film), starring Michael Pitt
- Jail Bait, a 2004 short film by Ben Sainsbury
- Jailbait, a 2014 film directed by Jared Cohn

== Television ==
- Jailbait (web series), a webseries starring John Lehr
- Jailbait (The Shield), an episode of The Shield

== Music ==
- Jail Bait, an album by Andre Williams or the title song
- "Jail Bait", a 1971 song by Wishbone Ash from Pilgrimage
- "Jailbait", a 1976 song by Nils Lofgren from Cry Tough
- "Jailbait", a 1980 song by Motörhead from Ace of Spades
- "Jailbait", a 1981 song by Ted Nugent from Intensities in 10 Cities
- "Jailbait", a 1982 song by Aerosmith from Rock in a Hard Place
- "Jailbait", a 1985 song by Grandmaster Flash from They Said It Couldn't Be Done
- "Jailbait", a 2011 song by Avicii

== Other ==
- Jailbait (book), a non-fiction book by Carolyn Cocca
- Jailbait (Reddit), a controversial Reddit community
