= Tim Bagley =

American actor and comedian (born 1957)

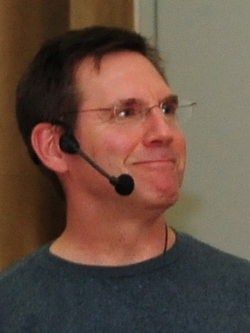
- Bagley in 2010
- Born: Timothy Hugh Bagley; August 17, 1957 (age 69); Minneapolis, Minnesota, U.S.
- Occupations: Actor; comedian
- Years active: 1989–present
- Website: www.timbagley.com

Timothy Hugh Bagley (born August 17, 1957) is an American actor and comedian, who has appeared in numerous films and television programs. He had recurring roles on the TV series Will & Grace, Hope & Gloria, Strip Mall, According to Jim, The King of Queens, Monk, Help Me Help You, 10 Items or Less, and $#*! My Dad Says, and portrayed Richard Pratt on the Showtime series Web Therapy. Previously, Bagley had a recurring role as Principal Toby Pearson on the American sitcom Teachers, and as Peter in the Netflix series Grace and Frankie.

== Career ==
=== Comedy ===
In 1989, Bagley began studying with The Groundlings, and was soon writing and performing with their prestigious Main Stage Company. Although he retired from the theatre's Main Company in the mid 1990s, Bagley still comes back regularly to perform in The Groundlings' all-improv show Cookin' with Gas. In 1995, Bagley left the Groundlings and turned his attention to television. After guest appearances on Diagnosis: Murder and Seinfeld, he landed his first regular role on the Showtime series Howie Mandel's Sunny Skies.

=== Television ===
Since breaking into television in the early 1990s, Bagley has become a familiar face on primetime television. He has guest starred on such shows as Seinfeld, Wings, Dharma & Greg, According to Jim, Curb Your Enthusiasm, The X Files, Suddenly Susan, ER, Ellen, 3rd Rock from the Sun, The Nanny, and Desperate Housewives.

Bagley has also had regular and recurring roles in such hit shows as The King of Queens, Hope & Gloria, Strip Mall, and 7th Heaven, and portrayed fellow OCD sufferer Harold Krenshaw on Monk for several episodes, often antagonizing the titular character, Adrian Monk, and his assistants, Sharona Fleming and Natalie Teeger. He was also a pivotal character in the pilot episode of "Grimm". He is perhaps best known on television for his appearances as Larry, one half of a married gay couple with an adopted daughter, on the hit sitcom Will & Grace.

Bagley also starred with Lisa Kudrow and Victor Garber on Web Therapy, the series of online vignettes developed by Kudrow which was adapted into a half-hour show by Showtime. He can also be seen as Principal Pearson on the 2016 TV Land comedy Teachers.

=== Film ===
In addition to his work in independent films, Bagley has appeared in big-budget movies like The Mask, Austin Powers: The Spy Who Shagged Me and Knocked Up. Other high-profile films include Employee of the Month, Happy, Texas and Mistress, starring Robert De Niro. He appeared briefly at the beginning of the 2006 film Accepted.

== Personal life ==
Bagley is gay and talks openly about his early struggles to be accepted. His partner of 10 years died in 1995 from kidney failure associated with complication from AIDS.

== Filmography ==
=== Film ===
Year	Title	Role	Notes
1992	Mistress	Mitch's Singing Student	
1994	The Mask	Irv Ripley	
1995	The Crazysitter	Mr. White	
1998	The Chosen One: Legend of the Raven	Ricky Dean	Direct-to-video
1999	Happy, Texas	David, Pageant Professional	
1999	Turkey. Cake.	Pete	Short film
1999	Austin Powers: The Spy Who Shagged Me	Friendly Dad	
2001	The Fluffer	Alan Dieser	
2004	The Day After Tomorrow	Tommy Levinson	
2005	The Storyteller	Pete	
2006	The Enigma with a Stigma	Mayor Ken Polk	
2006	Accepted	Vice Principal Matthews	
2006	Employee of the Month	Glen Gary	
2007	Jesus People	Rod Carmichael	
2007	Totally Baked: A Pot-U-Mentary	Rusty Polten	
2007	The Captain	The Captain	
2007	Knocked Up	Dr. Pellagrino	
2007	Goldfish	Mr. Jenkins	
2007	Walk Hard: The Dewey Cox Story	Engineer	
2009	Finding Bliss	Alan Balaban	
2009	Jesus People: The Movie	Rod Carmichael	
2009	Wig	Kent	
2009	Kevin Nealon: Now Hear Me Out!	Man in Stall	
2010	Operation: Endgame	Carl	
2012	This Is 40	Dr. Pellagrino	
2017	The Evil Within	Pete	
2018	Only Humans	Dan	
2018	Fishbowl California	Woody	
2019	Otherhood	Miles	
2023	Howdy, Neighbor!	Vell Cantrell	

=== Television ===
Year	Title	Role	Notes
1993	Coach	Cousin Roy	Episode: "Christmas of the Van Damned"
1994	Diagnosis: Murder	Questioner / Lance	2 episodes
1995	Howie Mandel's Sunny Skies	Various	2 episodes
1995	Seinfeld	Evan Fane	Episode: "The Maestro"
1995	Night Stand with Dick Dietrick	Marvin / Hubie	2 episodes
1995–1996	Hope & Gloria	Ed	3 episodes
1996	Wings	Luke	Episode: "Sons and Lovers"
1996	The Nanny	Flight Attendant	Episode: "A Pup in Paris"
1996	3rd Rock from the Sun	Frank	Episode: "Hotel Dick"
1997	Ellen	The Wine Maker	Episode: "Makin' Whoopie"
1997	Moloney	Collin	Episode: "Damage Control"
1997	ER	Archie Papion	Episode: "Whose Appy Now?"
1997	The Jeff Foxworthy Show	DMV Man	Episode: "Foxworthy Shall Rise Again"
1998	The Closer	Brother Xavier	Episode: "The Rebound"
1999	Suddenly Susan	Don	Episode: "Sometimes You Feel Like a Nut"
1999	The X-Files	Gordy	Episode: "Arcadia"
2000	V.I.P.	Renard Bouvoire	Episode: "Miss Con-Jeannie-Ality"
2000	Sabrina, the Teenage Witch	Mr. Cornwallis	Episode: "The End of an Era"
2000	Curb Your Enthusiasm	Shoe Salesman	Episode: "Ted and Mary"
2000–2001	Strip Mall	Dwight	22 episodes
2000–2006; 2018–2020	Will & Grace	Larry	17 episodes
2001	One on One	Phantom	Episode: "Phantom Menace"
2001	Dharma & Greg	Nelson	Episode: "Wish We Weren't Here"
2002	So Little Time	Mr. Diamond	Episode: "The Flat Tire"
2002	The Court	Gregg Willis	5 episodes
2003	Hidden Hills	Steven Haley	2 episodes
2003	I'm with Busey		Episode: "Learning and Knowledge"
2003	Wanda at Large	Bill	Episode: "Where's Roger?"
2003–2007	According to Jim	Tim Devlin	4 episodes
2004	Las Vegas	Stan Putasca	Episode: "You Can't Take It with You"
2004	Pilot Season	Jack Hiting	TV Mini-series, 2 episodes
2004	Wanda Does It	Tim Brewer	6 episodes
2004	Memron	Dr. Shue	Television film
2004–2007	The King of Queens	Neil / Glenn	4 episodes
2004–2009	Monk	Harold Krenshaw	9 episodes
2005	7th Heaven	Vincent's Father	2 episodes
2005	Father of the Pride	Voice	Episode: "Stage Fright"
2005	Joey	Leonard	Episode: "Joey and the House"
2005	Stephen's Life	Dick Silver	Television film
2006	The Room	Ben Ackerman	Television film
2006–2007	Help Me Help You	Pat Weiner	2 episodes
2006–2009	10 Items or Less	Don 'The Bag' Bagley	3 episodes
2007	The New Adventures of Old Christine	Dr. Mike	Episode: "Sleepless in Mar Vista"
2007	Jimmy Kimmel Live!	The Captain	"July 19, 2007"
2007	The Minor Accomplishments of Jackie Woodman	Dean	Episode: "Dykes Like Us"
2007	Case Closed	Ernie	Television film
2008	Miss Guided	Peter	2 episodes
2008	Desperate Housewives	Dr. Wagner	Episode: "Mirror, Mirror"
2008	Pushing Daisies	Colonel Likkin	Episode: "Comfort Food"
2008	Precious Meadows	Gordon Carroll	Television film
2008–2013	Web Therapy	Richard Pratt	3 episodes
2009	Me First!	Jeffrey Wise	
2009	Kath & Kim	Claude	Episode: "Home"
2009	Southland	Stanley Sidelsky	Episode: "Two Gangs"
2009	Dick Tracy Special	Security Guard	Television film
2010	Funny or Die Presents...	Mr. Stern	Episode: #1.3
2010	Accidentally on Purpose	Gavin	Episode: "Speed: Part 2"
2010	True Jackson, VP	Edward 'Ed' Wheeler	Episode: "True Drive"
2010–2011	$#*! My Dad Says	Tim	3 episodes
2010–2012	Hot in Cleveland	Larry	Episode: "Pilot"
2011	Shameless	Mike	Episode: "Casey Casden"
2011	Grimm	Postman	Episode: "Pilot"
2011–2015	Web Therapy	Richard Pratt	Main cast
2012	Shake It Up	Principal Rabinoff	Episode: "Protest It Up"
2013	Quick Draw	Mayor Dodge	Episode: "Railroad Spur"
2013	Wedding Band	Randy Lee	Episode: "Personal Universe"
2013	Happily Divorced	Michael	Episode: "Peter's Boyfriend"
2013	1600 Penn	Mr. Norgel	Episode: "Live from the Lincoln Bedroom"
2013	Ben and Kate	Mr. Caruthers	Episode: "Father-Daughter Dance"
2013	Trainers	Male Client	Episode: "The Predicament"
2013	2 Broke Girls	Dennis Endicott III	Episode: "And the Window of Opportunity"
2013	Anger Management	Zac	Episode: "Charlie Gets the Party Started"
2013	The League	Mr. Browner	2 episodes
2014	Dads	Ken	Episode: "Bully Gene"
2014	Kirstie	Robber	Episode: "When They Met"
2014	The Soul Man	Frederick	Episode: "Moving on Up"
2014	Bad Teacher	Greg	Episode: "Divorced Dudes"
2014	Young & Hungry	Reverend	Episode: "Young & Thirty (and Getting Married!)"
2014, 2026	The Comeback	Frank Flynn	7 episodes
2014–2016	You're the Worst	Caseworker	2 episodes
2015	Bad Judge		Episode: "Naked and Afraid"
2015	Episodes	Another Executive	Episode: "Episode Two"
2015	Workaholics	Party Host Scott	Episode: "Gayborhood"
2015	Cristela	Mr. Lathrop	Episode: "Gifted and Talented"
2015	Glee	Elementary Teacher	Episode: "Dreams Come True"
2015	Your Family or Mine	Man Nurse	Episode: "Christmas in July"
2015	Hot Girl Walks By	Jeffrey	Episode: "Visitors in a Hospital"
2015	Mr. Robinson	Supervisor Dalton	5 episodes
2015	Transparent	Wedding Planner	Episode: "Kina Hora"
2015–2022	Grace and Frankie	Peter	Recurring role, 32 episodes
2016–2019	Teachers	Principal Toby Pearson	Recurring role, 37 episodes
2016	Baby Daddy	Stanley Dexenberry	Episode: "Not So Great Grandma"
2016	New Girl	Lorne	Episode: "House Hunt"
2016	Mom	Dr. LaSalle	Episode: "Xanax and a Baby Duck"
2018	One Day at a Time	Henry	Episode: "Citizen Lydia"
2018	Roseanne	Jonathan	Episode: "Netflix and Pill"
2019	Bless This Mess	Jimmy	Episode: "The Chicken and the Goat"
2019	Grand Hotel	George	Episode: "Groom Service"
2019	Raven's Home	Judge Giovanni	Episode: "Disorder in the Court"
2020	AJ and the Queen	Lloyd Johnson	Episode: "Mt. Juliet"
2020	Man with a Plan	Arthur	Episode: "Driving Miss Katie"
2020	B Positive	Minister	Episode: "Pilot"
2021	Call Your Mother	Hank	Episode: "Sunday Dinner"
2021	Chicago Party Aunt		Episode: "Halloweener Circle" (voice)
2021–2022	Call Me Kat	Wyatt	Recurring role, 7 episodes
2021–2025	The Great North	Principal Gibbons	Recurring role, 13 episodes (voice)
2022	The Woman in the House Across the Street from the Girl in the Window	School Official	Episode 4
2022	Killing It	Mr. Franks	Episode: "Pilot"
2023	History of the World, Part II	The Doctor	Episode: "V"
2023–2024	Somebody Somewhere	Brad Schraeder	Recurring role
2023	American Born Chinese	John	Episode: "A Monkey on a Quest"
2023	And Just Like That...	Greg	Episode: "Chapter Three"
2023	Last Week Tonight	HOA lawyer, Dollar Store Executive	2 episodes
2024	The Perfect Couple	Roger Pelton	
2026	Carrie	Peter Morton	Recurring role
