= Evie Peck =

American actress and producer

- Occupations: Actress; Producer; Director
- Notable credits: Memron; 10 Items or Less

Evie Peck is an American actress, television writer and producer who has guest starred in several television programs such as Friends and Buffy the Vampire Slayer. She produced and starred in the independent mockumentary film Memron in 2004.

In 1991, Peck was part of the Mean Street Ensemble, performing in the Los Angeles production of No Trespassing Zone.

She worked with The Actors' Gang, starring as Taylor in the 1994 production of Tracy Young's Hysteria, as well as the troupe's 1996 production of Young's Euphoria. Her role in Hysteria earned her a nomination for the 1994 Ovation Award in the category of featured actress in a musical.

She played Cinderella in the troupe's 1998 production of Medea/Macbeth/Cinderella. In 1999, Peck appeared in the stage play Four Roses, as well as The Actors' Gang's production of Exit the King. She also performed in the film The Big Tease that year.

In 2000, she starred as the protester April in the stage play How to Steal an Election, performed with The Actors' Gang. In 2001, she performed Lee Hall's adaptation of Carlo Goldoni's The Servant of Two Masters (titled A Servant to Two Masters) as Clarice.

In 2003, she directed 3 Acts of Denial, a series of three one-act plays, for the Orphans Theatre Company. In 2007, she served as an associate producer on the TBS series 10 Items or Less as well as performing improv scenes with the actors. That year, she also played the role of KG's mom in The Pick of Destiny.

In 2008, Peck played the role of Betty Schaeffer in The Actors' Gang production of Klüb.

Peck was a member of the Screen Actors Guild and highly recommended union membership.

== Credits ==
Film credits
Title	Role	Year	Ref.
The Big Tease	Actress: Reindeer Suit Person	1999	
Memron	Producer; Actress	2004	
The Pick of Destiny	Actress: KG's mom	2007	

Stage credits
Play	Role	Company	Year	Ref.
No Trespassing Zone		Mean Street Ensemble	1991	
Hysteria	Taylor	The Actors' Gang	1994	
Euphoria		The Actors' Gang	1994	
Medea/Macbeth/Cinderella	Cinderella	The Actors' Gang	1998	
Exit the King	Queen Marie	The Actors' Gang	1999	
How to Steal an Election	April	The Actors' Gang	2000	
A Servant to Two Masters	Clarice		2001	
3 Acts of Denial	Director	Orphans Theatre Company	2003	
Klüb	Betty Schaeffer	The Actors' Gang	2008	

Television credits
Series	Role	Episode	Date	Ref.
Seinfeld	Woman	S7E2: "The Postponement"	September 28, 1995	
Lois & Clark: The New Adventures of Superman	Woman	S3E7: "Ultra Woman"	November 12, 1995	
Buffy the Vampire Slayer	Angry girl	S4E1: "The Freshman"	October 5, 1999	
10 Items or Less	Associate producer			
