= Allison Dunbar =

American actress (born 1972

- Born: Allison Barron; July 31, 1972 (age 54)
- Education: Fordham University
- Occupations: Actress; improvisational comedian; burlesque dancer
- Years active: 1994–present
- Spouse(s): Sean O'Donnell (m. 2001; div. 2004) Ron Perlman (m. 2022)

Allison Barron (born July 31, 1972), known professionally as Allison Dunbar, is an American actress. She has appeared on TV series such as The Sopranos, Quick Draw, Crazy Ex-Girlfriend, StartUp, Single Parents, and For All Mankind. She was a longtime member of the Groundlings, an improvisational comedy troupe.

== Early life ==
Dunbar grew up in Ardentown, Delaware, the daughter of Wendy and Tim Barron. Her mother worked for the Villanova University School of Law, and her father was a deputy attorney general for the state. She began acting in plays at an early age. She attended St. Mark's High School in Wilmington, Delaware, where she starred in the theater program and graduated in 1990. Her high school theater teacher said of her: "She was not the starry-eyed, I'm-going-to-be-an-actress kind of person. She knew about showing up at 6 a.m. for an audition and getting pictures and résumés done." She studied theater at Fordham University in New York City, graduating with honors in 1994. During college, she performed in several off-Broadway productions and TV commercials. She also made a Broadway appearance in Waitin' in the Wings at the Majestic Theatre.

== Career ==
Dunbar made her TV debut with a guest role on Law & Order in 1994. After graduating from college, she moved to Los Angeles to pursue a TV career, saying: "Some people come out here to win Academy Awards or to be some heavy actor, but doing a sitcom has been my dream." During her early years in Los Angeles, she had further guest roles on TV series including Wings (1996), Silk Stalkings, Pacific Blue (both 1997), and Diagnosis: Murder (1998). She said of her preferred character type: "There's nothing more interesting than a spicy bad-girl role. It fits me. I'm no pushover."

In 2000, Dunbar booked her first TV series regular role on the Comedy Central sitcom Strip Mall, playing pornographic actress Hedda Hummer. After wrapping the second and final season of the show in 2001, she moved to Boston for two years as her then husband, Sean O'Donnell, signed with the Boston Bruins. Soon after returning to Los Angeles in 2003, she was cast as Nicole Lupertazzi, the wife of mobster Little Carmine, on the fifth season of the HBO series The Sopranos. Over the next several years, she made guest appearances on TV series including Criminal Minds (2005), Bones (2006), Shark (2007), 10 Items or Less (2008), and Castle (2010). She also co-wrote, produced, and starred in a television pilot called Nobody's Happy.

After being told she was "too old" for certain roles, Dunbar decided to "reinvent myself as a comedy actor" and studied improvisational theater with the Groundlings comedy troupe. She was promoted to the main company in 2012, going on to spend 13 years with the group. Following her departure, the Groundlings wrote on social media that she had "left a lasting mark on our theatre and community, and we're so grateful for the talent, creativity, and laughter she brought to our stage". She also worked as a burlesque dancer and choreographer and created a burlesque troupe, Smokeshow, based at the Harvelle's music club in Santa Monica.

In 2013, Dunbar became a series regular on the Hulu original show Quick Draw, a partly improvised parody of the Western genre; she played saloonkeeper and madam Honey Shaw on both seasons. Over the next decade, she had recurring roles on TV series including Crazy Ex-Girlfriend (2015–2018), StartUp (2018; alongside future husband Ron Perlman), Single Parents (2019), and For All Mankind (2022), and appeared in comedy films including The F**k-It List, The Opening Act (both 2020), and Maggie Moore(s) (2023).

== Personal life ==
Dunbar married ice hockey player Sean O'Donnell in 2001. They met while Dunbar was working as a bartender and O'Donnell was playing for the Los Angeles Kings. They divorced in 2004. In 2022, Dunbar married her StartUp co-star Ron Perlman in Italy after three years of dating.

She is an avid supporter of pet adoption.

== Filmography ==
=== Film ===
Year	Title	Role	Notes
1999	Body Shots	Girl #3	
2000	The Convent	Davina	
2000	Time of Her Time		
2000	Daybreak	Reporter	
2001	Falcon Down	Connie Eldridge	TV film
2007	The Anna Nicole Smith Story	Cassie	
2007	The Gene Generation	Christian's Wife	
2010	Sheltered	Susan	
2019	Flashout	Karen	
2020	The F**k-It List	Leslie Willem	
2020	Browse	Rachel/Candy	
2020	The Opening Act	Helga	
2020	Film Fest	Kim Lincoln	
2022	Classified	Kitty Rash	TV film
2023	Maggie Moore(s)	Stephanie	
2024	McCurdy Point	Jason	

=== Television ===
Year	Title	Role	Notes
1994	Law & Order	Allison Marissa Hall	Episode: "Doubles"
1994	Guiding Light	Boutique Salesclerk	1 episode
1996	Wings	Bartender	Episode: "Single and Hating It"
1997	Cybill	Woman #1	Episode: "In Her Dreams"
1997	Silk Stalkings	Patti Prescott/SweetPea	Episode: "callme@murder.com"
1997	Renegade	Karen	Episode: "Blood Hunt"
1997	Hangin' with Mr. Cooper	Woman	Episode: "The Spa"
1997	Mike Hammer, Private Eye	Sharon Diamond	Episode: "False Truths"
1997	Pacific Blue	Jillian Ashford	Episode: "Avenging Angel"
1998	Diagnosis: Murder	Spring Dano	Episode: "Retribution: Part 1"
2000–2001	Strip Mall	Hedda Hummer	Main role
2001	CSI: Crime Scene Investigation	Rachel Carson	Episode: "Table Stakes"
2004–2007	The Sopranos	Nicole Lupertazzi	Recurring role (season 5–6)
2005	Dr. Vegas	Giselle	Episode: "Babe in the Woods"
2005	Drake & Josh	Peggy Sherman	Episode: "The Affair"
2005	The Inside	Paige Fuller	Episode: "Old Wounds"
2005	Barbershop	Missy Starlight	2 episodes
2005	Criminal Minds	Allison Crawford	Episode: "The Fox"
2006	Bones	Brianna Lynch	Episode: "The Titan on the Tracks"
2006	Cold Case	Alison Huxley	Episode: "The Key"
2007	Shark	Maria Correlli	Episode: "Backfire"
2008	10 Items or Less	Miriam	Episode: "The Bromance"
2008	The Middleman	Doris Schon	Episode: "The Manicoid Teleportation Conundrum"
2010	Castle	Sandra Meyers	Episode: "Food to Die For"
2011	A Guy Walks Into a Bar	Woman	Episode: "Perfect Condition"
2011	Rizzoli & Isles	Kim Marks	Episode: "Don't Stop Dancing, Girl"
2012	2 Broke Girls	Susan	Episode: "And the Pearl Necklace"
2013–2014	Quick Draw	Honey Shaw	Main role
2014	The Mentalist	Judy Lomax	Episode: "The Silver Briefcase"
2015–2018	Crazy Ex-Girlfriend	Stacy Whitefeather	Recurring role
2016	Angie Tribeca	Julie Gaffney	Episode: "Murder in the First Class"
2016	Modern Family	Abigail	Episode: "Thunk in the Trunk"
2016–2019	Mike Tyson Mysteries	Various	Voice; 2 episodes
2017	Famous in Love	Adriana	Episode: "Not So Easy A"
2017	Nobodies	HBO Rep	Episode: "Not the Emmys"
2018	StartUp	Kelly	Recurring role (season 3)
2019	Single Parents	Charlene	2 episodes
2019	The Donors	Lynda	Episode: "Scrambling"
2019	Yellowstone	Veronique	Episode: "Enemies by Monday"
2020	Tacoma FD	Hannah Barbioso	Episode: "Mike & Ike"
2021	Dave	Sherry	Episode: "Ad Man"
2022	For All Mankind	Jenna Leigh	3 episodes
