= Memron =

2004 mockumentary film

- Screenplay by: Nancy Homer; Robert Stark Hickey
- Story by: Nancy Hower
- Directed by: Nancy Hower
- Starring: Mike McShane; Claire Forlani; Tim Bagley; John Lehr; Evie Peck
- Country of origin: United States
- Original language: English

Production
- Producers: Nancy Hower; Evie Peck
- Running time: 79 min
- Budget: ~US$65,000

Original release
- Release: January 18, 2004

Memron is a 2004 mockumentary film inspired by the Enron scandal. This improv film stars Mike McShane as the corrupt Memron executive, and also features Claire Forlani, Tim Bagley, John Lehr and Evie Peck. The film was written, directed and produced by Nancy Hower, and won an award at Slamdance Film Festival.
