= 10 Items or Less =

10 Items or Less or Ten Items or Less may refer to:

- 10 Items or Less (TV series), an improvisational comedy series
- 10 Items or Less (film) by Brad Silberling
- An express checkout lane normally found at the supermarket
