= Belle Starr =

American outlaw (1848–1889)

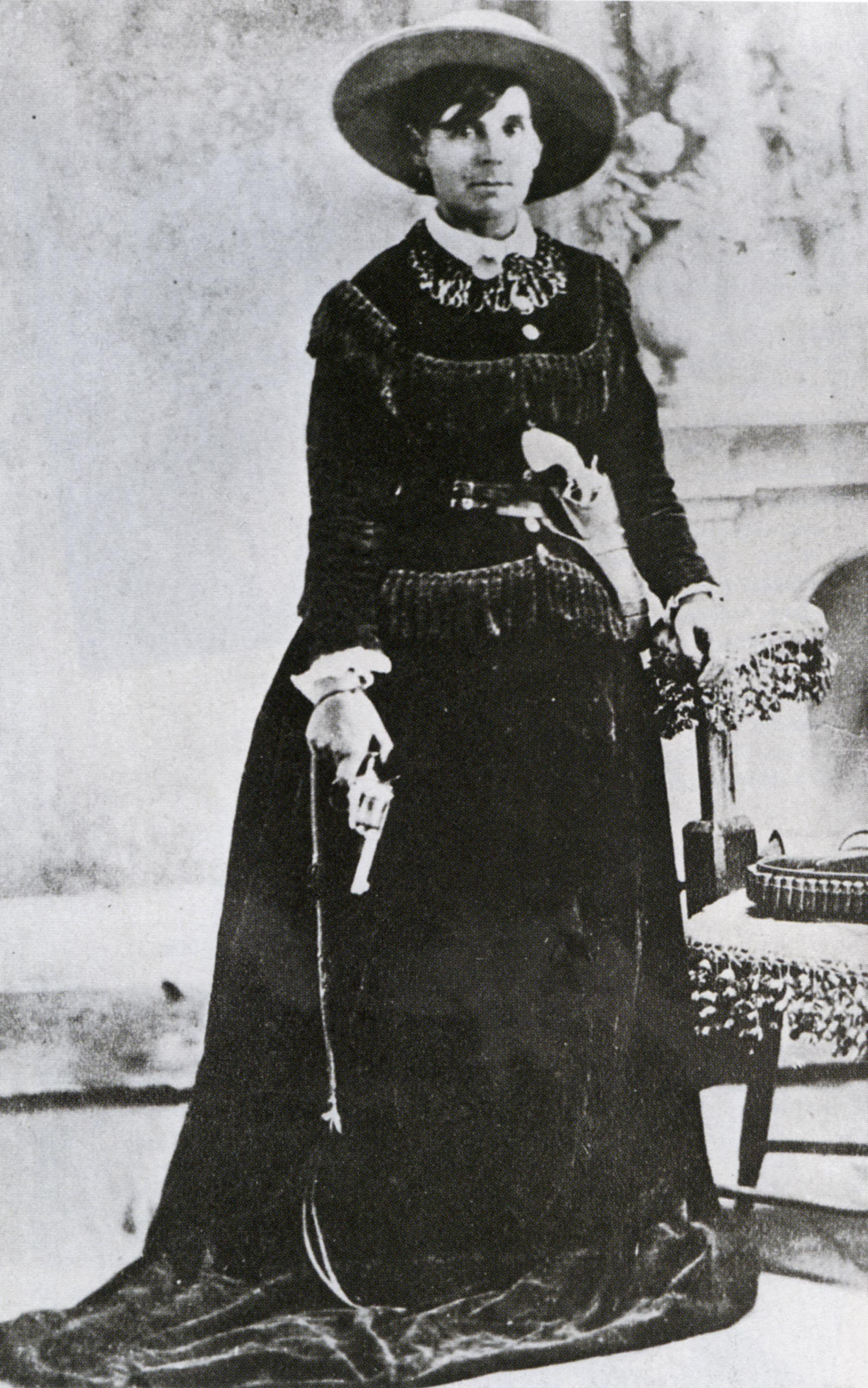
- Belle Starr in 1887
- Born: Myra Maybelle Shirley; February 5, 1848; Carthage, Missouri
- Died: February 3, 1889 (aged 40); Hoyt, Oklahoma, Indian Territory
- Cause of death: Gunshot wounds
- Years active: 1880–1889
- Criminal charge: Horse theft
- Spouses: James C. Reed; Sam Starr; Jim July Starr
- Children: Pearl Starr; Eddie Reed

Myra Maybelle Shirley Reed Starr (February 5, 1848 – February 3, 1889), better known as Belle Starr, was an American outlaw who gained national notoriety after her violent death.

She associated with the James–Younger Gang and other outlaws. She was convicted of horse theft in 1883. She was fatally shot in 1889 in a case that is still officially unsolved. Her story was popularized by Richard Kyle Fox and she later became a popular character in television and films.

== Early life ==
Belle Starr was born Myra Maybelle Shirley on her father's farm near Carthage, Missouri, on February 5, 1848. Most of her family members called her May. Her father, John Shirley, prospered raising wheat, corn, hogs and horses, though he was considered to be the "black sheep" of a well-to-do Virginia family which had moved west to Indiana, where he married and divorced twice. Her mother, Elizabeth "Eliza" Hatfield Shirley, was John Shirley's third wife and a distant relative to the Hatfields of the famous family feud. In the 1860s, Belle's father sold the farm and moved the family to Carthage, where he bought a livery stable and blacksmith shop on the town square.

Myra Shirley received a classical education and learned piano, while graduating from Missouri's Carthage Female Academy, a private institution that her father had helped to found.

== Civil War and aftermath ==
During the American Civil War, Myra's older brother, John A. M. "Bud" Shirley, was an active Jasper County "bushwhacker", fighting for the Confederacy. Myra was reputed to have supported her brother in these efforts, perhaps as a spy, although not much is known about the exact details. Bud was killed by federal troops in late June 1864. Soon after,

"sick at heart over Bud’s death and his business ruined by the theft and destruction, [John Shirley] disposed of his property, loaded his family and household goods into two Conestoga wagons, and set out for Texas ... Shirley’s destination was Scyene, a small settlement ten miles southeast of Dallas. Myra [May], a dutiful daughter, drove one of the wagons."

According to the book Belle Starr by Burton Rascoe (Random House, 1941), the "Shirleys were regarded as 'rather common,' because they had no slaves." While in school, Myra was "irregular in attendance" and was regarded as "rather wild" by teacher Mrs. Poole.

Following the war, members of the Reed family also moved to Texas and, according to Collin County marriage records, James C. Reed and Mira [sic] M. Shirley were married there on November 1, 1866. Two years later, she gave birth to her first child, Rosie Lee (nicknamed Pearl). Belle always harbored a strong sense of style, which fed into her later legend. A crack shot, she used to ride sidesaddle while dressed in a black velvet riding habit and an ostrich feather-plumed hat, carrying two pistols, with cartridge belts across her hips. Reed turned to crime and was wanted for murder in Arkansas, which caused the family to move to California, where their second child, James Edwin (Eddie), was born in 1871.

Later returning to Texas, Reed was involved with several criminal gangs. While Reed initially tried his hand at farming, he grew restless, and associated himself with the Starr clan, a Cherokee family notorious for whiskey, cattle, and horse thievery in the Indian Territory (now Oklahoma), as well as the James and Younger gangs. In April 1874, despite a lack of any evidence, a warrant was issued for Belle's arrest for a stagecoach robbery by her husband and others. Reed was killed in August of that year in Paris, Texas, where he had settled down with his family.

== Marriages and later years ==
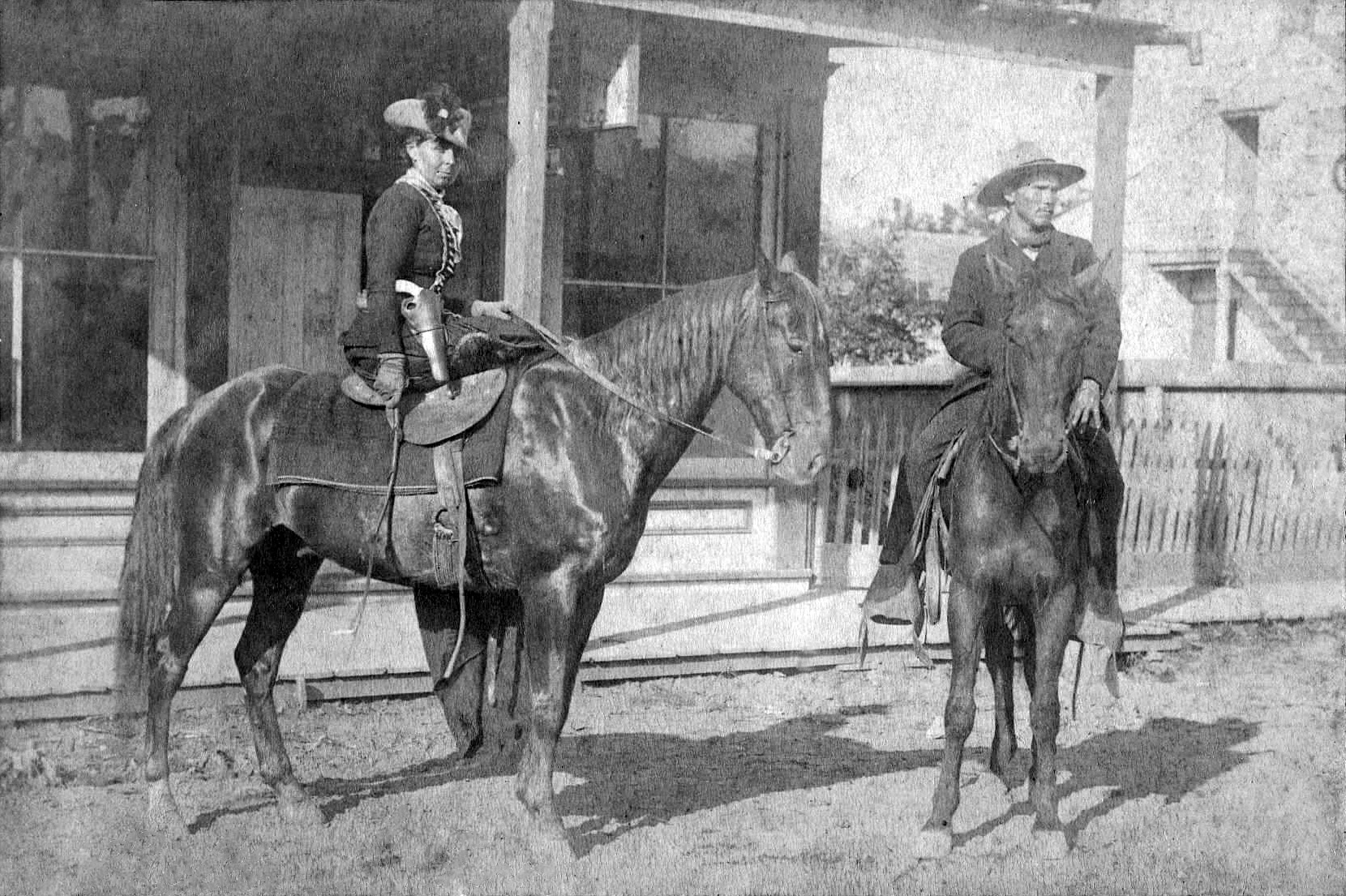
Belle Starr, Fort Smith, Arkansas, 1886; the man on the horse is Deputy U.S. Marshal Benjamin Tyner Hughes who, along with his posse man, Deputy U.S. Marshal Charles Barnhill, arrested her at Younger's Bend in May 1886 and brought her to Ft. Smith for arraignment.

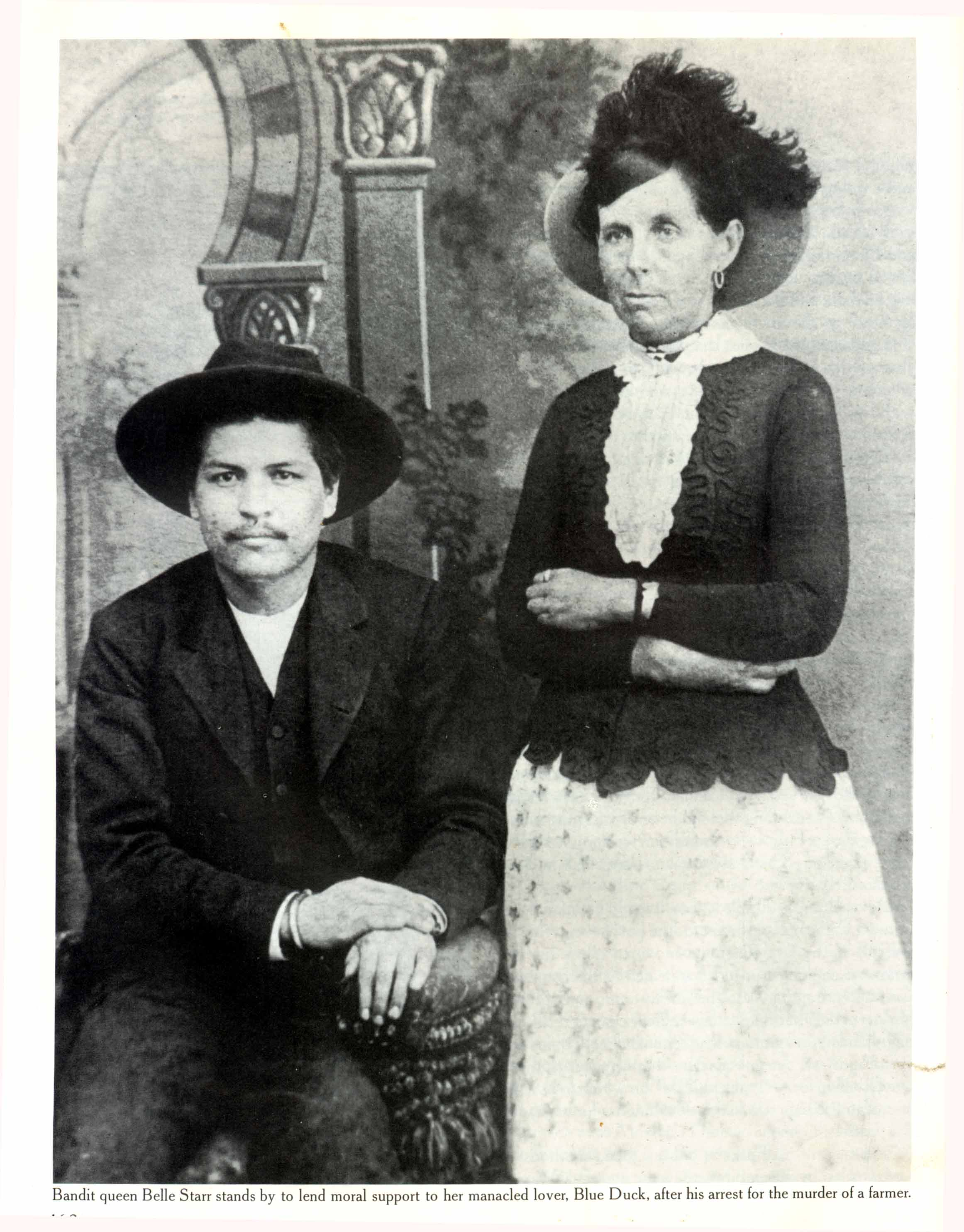
Blue Duck and Belle Starr, May 24, 1886.

Belle was allegedly briefly married, for three weeks in 1878, to Charles Younger, uncle of Cole Younger, but this is not substantiated by any evidence. There are numerous claims that Belle's daughter Pearl Reed was actually Pearl Younger, but in Cole Younger's autobiography (quoted in Glen Shirley's "Belle Starr and her times"), he discounted that as rubbish and stated what he knew truly of Belle.

In 1880, she married a Cherokee man named Sam Starr and settled with the Starr family in the Indian Territory. By her marriage to Sam Starr, she was an aunt to Henry Starr. She learned ways of organizing, planning, and fencing for the rustlers, horse thieves, and bootleggers, as well as harboring them from the law. Belle's illegal enterprises proved lucrative enough for her to employ bribery to free her colleagues from the law whenever they were caught.

In 1882, Belle and Sam were charged with horse theft. The arrest warrant was served by Deputy U.S. Marshal Lemuel Marks. The pair were tried before "The Hanging Judge" Isaac C. Parker in Fort Smith, Arkansas; the prosecutor was United States Attorney W. H. H. Clayton. She was found guilty and served nine months at the Detroit House of Corrections in Detroit, Michigan. Belle proved to be a model prisoner and, during her time in jail, she won the respect of the prison matron. In contrast, Sam was incorrigible and assigned to hard labor. In a contradictory account after her arrest by the Marshal, "Belle proved to be a loud and unruly prisoner."

In 1886, she eluded conviction on another theft charge, but, on December 17, Sam Starr was involved in a gunfight with his cousin, law officer Frank West. Both men were killed, and Belle's life as an outlaw queen—and what had been the happiest relationship of her life—abruptly ended with her husband's death.

For the last few years of her life, gossips and scandal sheets linked her to a series of men with colorful names, including Jack Spaniard, Jim French and Blue Duck, after which she married a relative of Sam Starr, Jim July, who later became Jim July Starr, who was some 15 years younger than she was.

=== Children ===
Eddie Reed, Belle's son, was convicted of horse theft and receiving stolen property in July 1889. Judge Parker sent him to prison in Columbus, Ohio. Belle's daughter Rosie Reed, also known as Pearl Starr, became a prostitute to raise funds for Eddie's release, eventually obtaining a presidential pardon for him in 1893. Eddie became a deputy in Fort Smith and killed two outlaw brothers named Crittenden in 1895. He himself was killed in a saloon in Claremore, Oklahoma on December 14, 1896. Pearl operated several bordellos in Van Buren and Fort Smith, Arkansas, from the 1890s to World War I.

== Unsolved murder ==
Belle was killed on February 3, 1889. She was riding home from a neighbor's house when she was ambushed. After she fell off her horse, she was shot again to make sure she was dead. Her death resulted from shotgun wounds to the back and neck and in the shoulder and face. Legend says she was shot with her own double-barrel shotgun.

According to Frank "Pistol Pete" Eaton, Belle's death was due to different circumstances. She had been attending a dance. Frank Eaton had been the last person to dance with her, when one of her sharecroppers, Edgar J. Watson, clearly intoxicated, had asked for a dance. Belle declined, and he later followed her out of the dance. When she stopped to give her horse a drink at a creek on the way home, he shot and killed her. According to Eaton, Watson was tried, convicted, and executed by hanging for the murder.

However, another story says that there were no witnesses and that no one was ever convicted of the murder. Suspects with apparent motive included her new husband, both of her children, and Edgar Watson, because he was afraid she was going to turn him in to the authorities as an escaped murderer from Florida with a price on his head. Watson, who was killed in 1910, was tried for her murder, but was acquitted, and the ambush has entered Western lore as "unsolved".

One source suggests her son, whom she had allegedly beaten for mistreating her beloved horse, may have been her killer.

== In popular culture ==
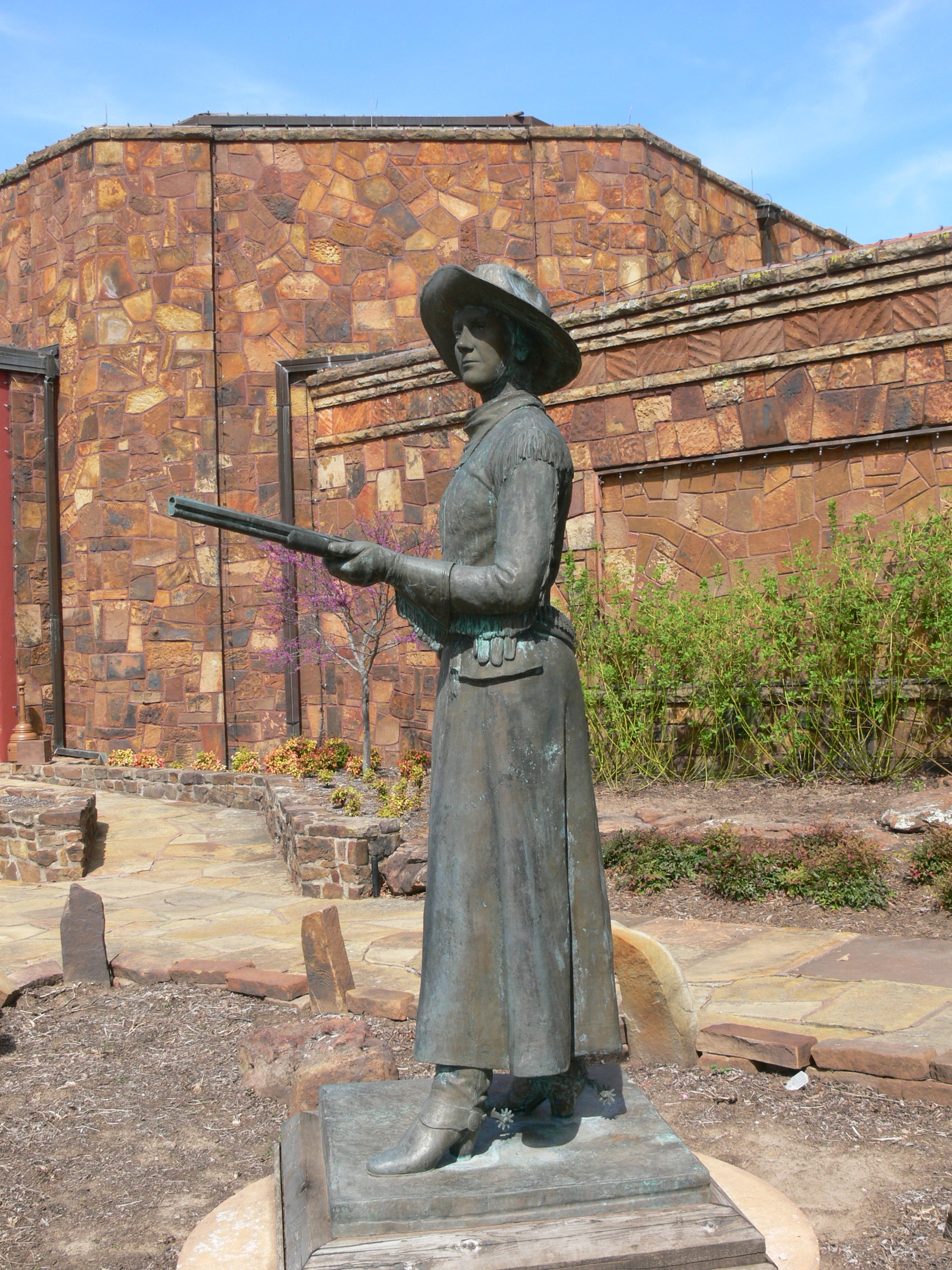
Statue of Belle Starr at Woolaroc in Oklahoma, made by the artist Jo Mora.

Although she was an obscure figure outside Texas throughout most of her life, Belle's story was picked up by the dime novel and National Police Gazette publisher Richard K. Fox, who made her name famous with his fictional novel Bella Starr, the Bandit Queen, or the Female Jesse James, published in 1889 (the year of her murder). This novel still is cited as a historical reference despite its artistic license and lack of historical accuracy. It was the first of many popular stories that used her name.

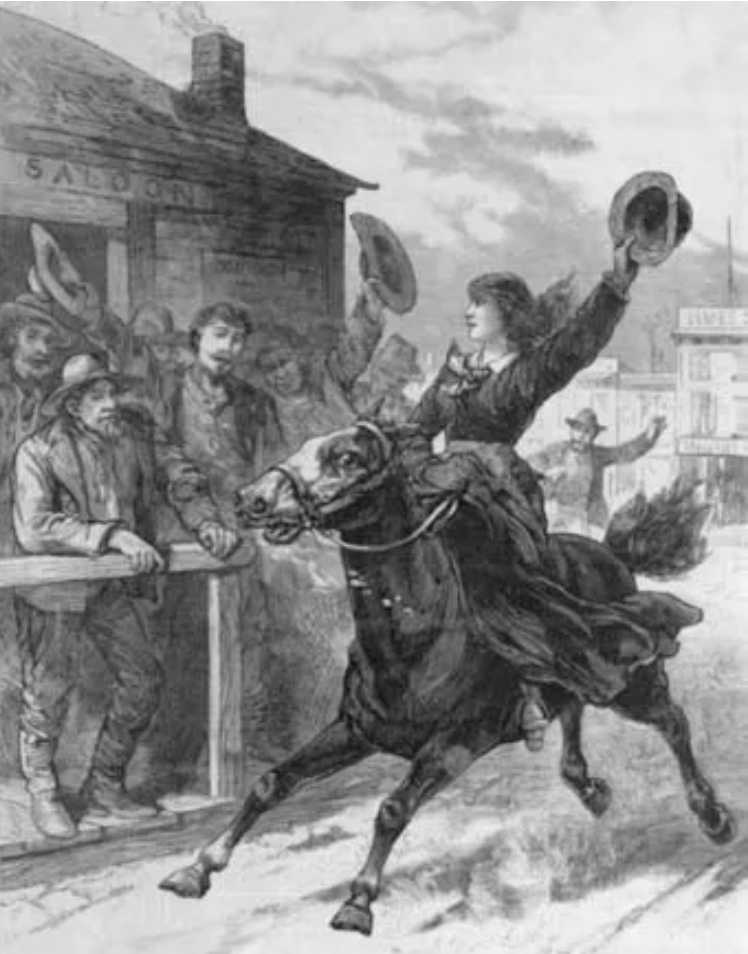
Belle Star, "A Wild Western Amazon," as depicted in the National Police Gazette, 1886

=== Film and television series ===
- She was portrayed by Betty Compson in a 1928 silent film Court Martial.
- In a 1938 Hopalong Cassidy movie Heart of Arizona she was portrayed by Natalie Moorhead.
- Sally Payne appeared as Belle Starr in the Roy Rogers western Robin Hood of the Pecos (1941).
- Gene Tierney played the title role in the big-budget film Belle Starr (1941). It made no pretense to accuracy but it was a success, and it increased Hollywood's interest in the character. In three equally fictionalized treatments, Isabel Jewell played Starr in Badman's Territory (1946) and Belle Starr's Daughter (1948), and Jane Russell played the role in Montana Belle (1952).
- In 1954, former Miss Utah Marie Windsor played Starr in the premiere episode of Jim Davis's television series Stories of the Century.
- In 1957, Jeanne Cooper, later a soap opera star, played Belle Starr in an episode of Dale Robertson's Tales of Wells Fargo. In this episode, Starr calls herself Mrs. Reed. There is mention of "Hanging Judge" Isaac C. Parker, and the episode makes mention of his sentencing Starr to a comparatively short prison term in a correctional facility at Detroit. In 1960, Cooper again played Belle Starr in an episode of the TV series Bronco titled "Shadow of Jesse James".
- In 1959, Jean Willes portrayed Starr in the Maverick episode "Full House" opposite James Garner.
- In 1960, Lynn Bari played Belle in the premiere episode, titled "Perilous Passage", of the short-lived NBC western Overland Trail.
- In 1961, Carole Mathews appeared as Belle in "A Bullet for the D.A.", an episode of Death Valley Days, hosted by Stanley Andrews.
- In 1965, Sally Starr, a television host from Philadelphia, Pennsylvania, played the character for laughs in The Three Stooges' feature film The Outlaws Is Coming.
- In 1968, Elsa Martinelli starred as Belle Starr in The Belle Starr Story, a western directed by Lina Wertmüller.
- In 1975, Brooke Tucker appeared as Belle Starr alongside Marty Ingels as Billy the Kid in "They Went Thataway", the ninth episode of The Ghost Busters.
- In 1977, Florence Henderson appeared as Belle Starr in Storybook Squares, a version of Hollywood Squares for children.
- Elizabeth Montgomery portrayed Belle in the 1980 television movie Belle Starr, made by Hanna-Barbera.
- Pamela Reed portrayed Belle Starr in the 1980 Hollywood film The Long Riders.
- In 1995, Belle Starr was portrayed by Melissa Clayton in season 3 of Dr. Quinn, Medicine Woman, in an episode titled "Baby Outlaws", as a 14-year-old outlaw who falls under the care of the good doctor and her family. This episode takes place in 1870, when Belle actually would have been 22.
- In 2007, independent filmmaker Ron Maxwell optioned the film rights to novelist Speer Morgan's 1979 book Belle Starr. In the December 2008 issue of Chronicles: A Magazine of American Culture, Maxwell is mentioned as being the director of a forthcoming film titled Belle Starr.
- The 2010 film Bass Reeves is a fictionalized version of lawman Bass Reeves's life, and it features a depiction of Belle Starr.
- In the 2013 series Quick Draw!, a fictionalized account of Belle Starr portrays her as the deceased spouse of the protagonist Sheriff John Henry Hoyle. She is referenced as wife of Cole Younger and Sam Starr. Arden Myrin appears in two episodes as Belle Starr, and Alexia Dox appears as Pearl Starr as a series regular.
- An early 2015 episode of The Pinkertons features Sheila Campbell as Belle Carson at the beginning of Belle's exploits as an outlaw (highly fictionalized, with the name Belle Starr as her fantasy persona and an affair with Jesse James in Kansas City).
- Amber Sweet plays Belle Starr in the 2019 film Hell on the Border, written and directed by Wes Miller.
- Rebecca McGary plays Belle Starr in the 2019 horror film “Hell’s Belle,” directed by Terry Spears, in which the ghost of Belle Starr seeks revenge against a group of archeology students who steal a piece of jewelry from her grave.

=== Literature and music ===
- Woody Guthrie wrote a song titled "Belle Starr."
- Margot Douaihy wrote a docupoetry book called "Bandit/Queen: The Runaway Story of Belle Starr" (2022), imagining the inner life of the outlaw, casting Belle Starr as trailblazing feminist and intersectional figure, a "runaway".
- Emmylou Harris and Mark Knopfler's 2006 collaboration All the Roadrunning features a track titled "Belle Starr," written by Harris.
- Sissy Spacek wrote the song "Some Small Crime" about Starr and sang it with Levon Helm on The Midnight Special in 1980.
- The 'ghost of Belle Starr' is mentioned in "Tombstone Blues" on Bob Dylan's album Highway 61 Revisited (1965). Belle Starr is mentioned by Dylan in the lyrics of "Seeing The Real You at Last" on the album Empire Burlesque (1985).
- Belle Starr (1979) was the first novel of American author and editor Speer Morgan.
- The Legend of Belle Starr (1979) was a historical novel by Stoney Hardcastle.
- The unsolved murder of Belle Starr is the basis for the Douglas C. Jones novel The Search for Temperance Moon (1991). A character based on Pearl Starr, Belle's daughter, is featured as a bordello owner in Fort Smith, Arkansas.
- Pulp western author J.T. Edson featured Belle Starr in several of his Floating Outfit series of novels as the love interest of Mark Counter, one of the three lead protagonists in the series. Edson's novel Guns in the Night features Belle Starr's being murdered when pregnant with Mark Counter's child after which the Floating Outfit team to catch her murderer.
- One of the more distinctive adaptations of the legend of Belle Starr was made by the Japanese manga artist Akihiro Ito, who in 1993 created a manga known as Belle Starr Bandits, loosely based on historical figures, facts and events. She had an appearance in the manga Gun Blaze West from Nobuhiro Watsuki, as one of J.J.'s (Jesse James) gang members. ISBN 3-89885-759-X
- Belle Starr appeared as a caricature in the 1995 Belle Starr album of the Lucky Luke comics series, illustrated by Morris and written by Xavier Fauche.
- The 2009 historical novel The Branch and the Scaffold by Loren D. Estleman deals in part with Belle Starr's life in the Indian Nations as her path crossed that of Judge Isaac C. Parker.
- Peter Mattheissen's historical fiction (The Killing of Mr. Watson Trilogy and now Shadow Country) includes the story of E.J. Watson's murdering Belle Starr.
- American country singer Michael Martin Murphey sings about Belle Starr's life in a song titled "Belle Star" on his album Cowboy Songs III: Rhymes of the Renegades.
- The band Rival Sons recorded the song "Belle Starr" as the eighth song on their 2014 album, Great Western Valkyrie.
- A comic-book adaption of her fictionalized legend by Dick Wood appears as "Belle Starr" in Crime Does Not Pay #25.

=== Video games ===
- The brawler Belle in the game Brawl Stars was based on her. The in-game mastery title for that brawler is her surname (Starr).
- The character Black Belle in the game Red Dead Redemption 2 was based on Belle Starr.
- In the popular trading card game, Yu-Gi-Oh!, the Monster Card, "Magical Musketeer Starfire" was based on Belle Starr.

== See also ==
- List of unsolved murders (before 1900)
