= Deborah Theaker =

Canadian actress (born 1964)

- Born: April 6, 1964 (age 62); Moose Jaw, Saskatchewan, Canada
- Occupation: Actress
- Years active: 1986–present
- Spouse: Darren Boyce (d. 1995)

Deborah Theaker (born April 6, 1964) is a Canadian actress. She is best known as Casey Edison on the Lucasfilm science fiction satire Maniac Mansion which ran from 1990 until 1993.

== Early life and education ==
Theaker was born in Moose Jaw, Saskatchewan, Canada. In 1985, she graduated from the University of Saskatchewan and later moved to Toronto, where she became a member of The Second City's resident company.

== Career ==
Since 1987, she has played roles in various television shows and movies, including The Kids in the Hall, Joey, Howie Mandel's Sunny Skies, Desperate Housewives, Rat Race, Entourage, Bones, and Lemony Snicket's A Series of Unfortunate Events as well as the Stargate SG-1 season-eight episode entitled "Citizen Joe." She is a member of Christopher Guest's cinematic repertory company and has appeared in four films and multiple commercials for Guest. Theaker guest-starred as The Caterer in an episode of the first season of Curb Your Enthusiasm. Theaker then guest-starred in the third season of the acclaimed sitcom Husbands.

== Filmography ==
=== Film ===
Year	Title	Role	Notes
1988	A New Life	Shirley	
1994	In the Mouth of Madness	Municipal Woman	
1996	Waiting for Guffman	Gwen Fabin-Blunt	
1996	Shooting Lily	Lynda	
1997	Hayseed	Judy	
1998	Desperation Boulevard	Casting Lady	
1999	Dill Scallion	Natalie Juggs	
2000	Best in Show	Winky's Party Guest	
2001	Rat Race	Lucy	
2002	Run Ronnie Run!	Mrs. Robinson	Uncredited
2002	The Third Wheel	Nancy	
2003	A Mighty Wind	Naomi Steinbloom	
2004	Lemony Snicket's A Series of Unfortunate Events	Mrs. Poe	
2005	Cruel but Necessary	Nurse	
2006	Fat Girls	Judy	
2006	For Your Consideration	Liz Fenneman	
2008	Over Her Dead Body	Mary	
2010	Dirty Girl	Mrs. Hatcher	
2010	Summer Eleven	Cheryl	
2010	Gerald	Mother	
2011	Mangus!	Raquel Spedgewick	
2011	Let Go	Friendly Bank Teller	

=== Television ===
Year	Title	Role	Notes
1987	Seeing Things	Marsha (House-Buyer)	Episode: "The Naked Eye"
1988	ALF Tales	Madame Pokipsi	—N/a
1988–1989	ALF	Madame Pokipsi	13 episodes
1989	War of the Worlds	Saleslady	Episode: "Unto Us a Child Is Born"
1990	The Kids in the Hall	Double Date Girl	Episode #1.20
1990–1993	Maniac Mansion	Casey Edison	65 episodes
1994	Take Another Look	Health Addict	Television film
1994	Dan Redican Comedy Hour	Various	Television film
1995	Forever Knight	Daphne Malloch	Episode: "Beyond the Law"
1995	Double Rush	Producer	Episode: "Snowings and Goings"
1995	Harrison Bergeron	Jane Starbuck	Television film
1995	Howie Mandel's Sunny Skies	Various	2 episodes
1996	The Home Court	Doctor	Episode: "Dog Day Afternoon"
1996	Townies	Lydia	Episode: "Adventures of Rebound Girl"
1997	Temporarily Yours	Lynn	Episode: "Pilot"
1997	Mad About You	Judy Kaufman	Episode: "The Cockatoo"
1997	Ellen	Maura	Episode: "Just Coffee?"
1998	DiResta	Tourist	Episode: "Public Enema No. 1"
1999	The Chimp Channel	Old Rose	—N/a
2000	The Drew Carey Show	Susan	Episode: "Be Drew to Your School"
2000	Curb Your Enthusiasm	Debbie the Caterer	Episode: "AAMCO"
2001	Gilmore Girls	Mrs. Caldicott	Episode: "Concert Interruptus"
2001	Judging Amy	Mrs. Mattingly	Episode: "Imbroglio"
2002	Six Feet Under	Tour Guide	Episode: "Driving Mr. Mossback"
2002	The Burbs	Sissy	Television film
2003	Joan of Arcadia	Mrs. Marx	Episode: "Pilot"
2004	Reno 911!	Psychic	Episode: "Not Without My Mustache"
2005	Stargate SG-1	Charlene Spencer	Episode: "Citizen Joe"
2005	Joey	Lorraine	Episode: "Joey and the Break-up"
2005	Hopeless Pictures	Barbara	—N/a
2005	Stephen's Life	Debbie Silver	Television film
2005	Yes, Dear	Joanne	Episode: "Marital Aid"
2006	Desperate Housewives	Rhonda	Episode: "There Is No Other Way"
2007	Bones	Jackie Burrows	Episode: "The Boneless Bride in the River"
2007	In Case of Emergency	Sharon	Episode: "Happy Endings"
2007	Entourage	Dr. Marcus' Receptionist	Episode: "Manic Monday"
2007	Halfway Home	Cosmetics Manager	Episode: "Halfway Working"
2010	The Kids in the Hall: Death Comes to Town	Teacher	Episode: "The Stages of Grief"
2013	Husbands	Margot	Episode: "I Do Over"
2013	The Funtime Gang	Karen Bigsby	Television film
2014	Benched	Ruth	Episode: "Diamond Is a Girl's Worst Friend"
2016	2 Broke Girls	Audra	Episode: "And the Pity Party Bus"
2016	Lady Dynamite	Sheri	Episode: "White Trash"
2019	Dead to Me	Mrs. Bogle	Episode: "Oh My God"
2020	The Salon	Liz Larkin	Episode: "Extra Virgin Hair"
