= Frank Cochran =

Frank Cochran (c. 1853 – c. 1925) was a 19th-century Old West Deputy US Marshal in the service of Judge Isaac C. Parker, known as the "Hanging Judge", operating out of Fort Smith, Arkansas.

== Biography ==
Little is known about Cochran's early life. He is thought to have possibly been born in either Missouri or Arkansas, but in fact it is not known for certain from where he originated. Although by reputation he captured many outlaws of the day, he is less known than others serving during the same time period, such as Bill Tilghman, Heck Thomas, or Chris Madsen. His best known arrest was the capture of Blue Duck and his partner William Christie, after the two murdered a farmer in the Cherokee Nation. Cochran would later transfer to the Oklahoma City office, where he would lead a posse in the pursuit and capture of the Al Jennings Gang. During an 1891 corruption trial in Fort Smith, Cochran saved the life of Government Special Agent to the Court W. F. Harn, when a defendant's family member attempted to stab Harn.
