= Zig Zag (2002 film) =

- Official DVD cover
- Directed by: David S. Goyer
- Screenplay by: David S. Goyer
- Based on: Zigzag by Landon J. Napoleon
- Produced by: Elie Samaha; Andrew Stevens
- Starring: John Leguizamo; Wesley Snipes; Oliver Platt; Natasha Lyonne
- Cinematography: James L. Carter
- Edited by: Conrad Smart
- Music by: Grant-Lee Phillips
- Distributed by: Franchise Pictures
- Release dates: March 10, 2002 (South by Southwest); July 9, 2002 (United States)
- Running time: 101 minutes
- Country: United States
- Language: English
- Budget: $3.5 million
- Box office: $2,418 (US)

Zig Zag is a 2002 American drama film directed and written by David S. Goyer (in his directorial debut) and starring John Leguizamo, Wesley Snipes, Oliver Platt, and Natasha Lyonne. It is based on the 1999 novel Zigzag by Landon J. Napoleon. The film premiered at the 2002 South by Southwest Film Festival.

== Plot ==
Dean Singer (John Leguizamo) has terminal cancer, yet is determined to spend his last days taking care of his fifteen-year-old autistic protégé from the Big Brother program, Louis "Zig Zag" Fletcher (Sam Jones III). Dean got Louis a dishwasher job in shamelessly abusive, exploitative Mr. Walters' (Oliver Platt) restaurant. Louis' dead-beat, neglecting yet abusive dad pushes him for "rent", which he actually uses to repay violent loan-shark Cadillac Tom (Luke Goss). Zig Zag gets it by stealing from Walters' safe, remembering numbers being his only talent. Singer is determined to return the money, despite excessive risks, with surprising allies.

== Cast ==
- John Leguizamo as Dean Singer
- Wesley Snipes as David "Dave" Fletcher
- Oliver Platt as Mr. Walters "The Toad"
- Natasha Lyonne as Jenna, The Working Girl
- Luke Goss as Tom "Cadillac Tom"
- Sam Jones III as Louis "Zig-Zag" Fletcher
- Sherman Augustus as Detective Jonathan Hawke
- Michael Greyeyes as Dale
- Abraham Benrubi as Hector
- Roberta Valderrama as Tawny
- Elizabeth Pena as Ms. Tate
- Patton Oswalt as Shelly
- Lynette DuPree as Hooker (credited as Lynette Du Pre)
- Valarie Ianniello as Dancer #1
- Regina Russell Banali as Dancer #2
- Diana Terranova as Dancer #3

== Production ==
The film was shot in Los Angeles, California.

== Reception ==
=== Box office ===
The film was released in one theater and earned $1,649 in its opening weekend. The total US box office gross for Zig Zag was $2,418.

=== Critical response ===
On the review aggregator website Rotten Tomatoes, 44% of 16 critics' reviews are positive. The website's consensus reads: "Fine performances elevate the movie above the cliches." Metacritic, which uses a weighted average, assigned the film a score of 58 out of 100, based on 10 critics, indicating "mixed or average" reviews.
