= Blue Duck (outlaw) =

American outlaw

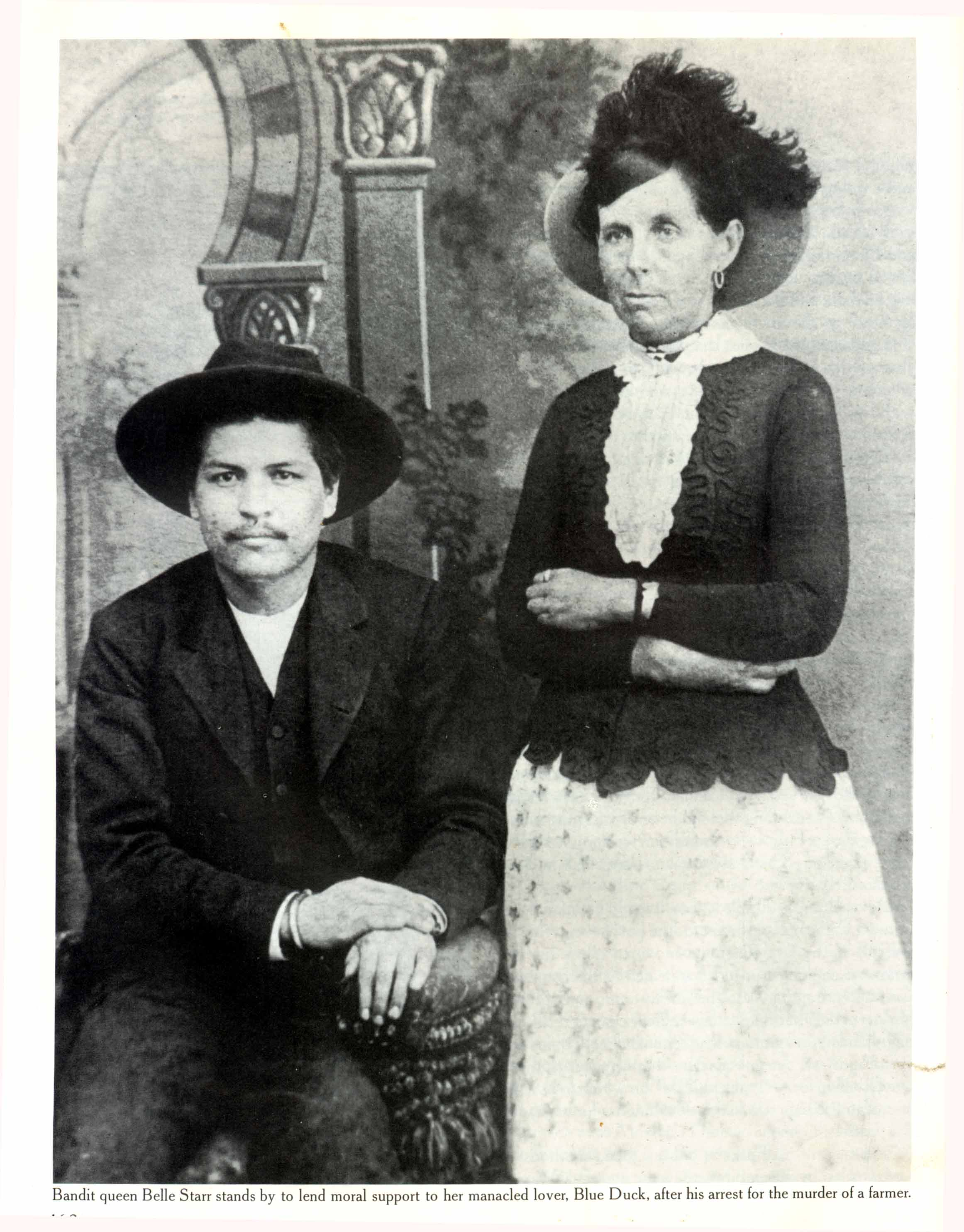
Blue Duck and Belle Starr, May 24, 1886

Blue Duck, sometimes referred to as Bluford Duck (17 June 1859–7 May 1895), was an outlaw of the American Old West, probably best known for a photograph taken of him in the mid-1880s, in which he posed with Belle Starr, a famous female outlaw.

== Biography ==
Blue Duck was born in the Cherokee Nation, with the name of Sha-con-gah. By the early 1870s he was riding with gangs across the Oklahoma Territory committing armed robberies and acts of cattle rustling. According to legend, Blue Duck became romantically involved with Belle Starr during that time. When she married outlaw Sam Starr, she and her husband formed their own gang, which Blue Duck joined. He is believed to have ridden with the gang through most of the latter part of the 1870s, although his involvement with them was off and on.

On June 23, 1884, while riding drunk in the Flint District of the Cherokee Nation, and in the company of outlaw William Christie, the two men came upon a farmer named Samuel Wyrick. For no apparent reason, the two outlaws opened fire on the farmer, emptying their revolvers into him and killing him. They then reloaded and fired on a young Cherokee boy who had witnessed the murder, missing him but shooting his horse from beneath him. Both Blue Duck and Christie were captured by Deputy US Marshal Frank Cochran and taken before Judge Isaac C. Parker, known as the "Hanging Judge", in Fort Smith, Arkansas. His only known connection with Belle Star is the fact that they appear in a photograph together after his arrest.

Both were convicted, although Christie was later cleared of the charge and released. Blue Duck was sentenced to hang, but later his sentence was reduced to life in prison. He was sent to Menard Penitentiary in Chester, Illinois, as Inmate #2486. Blue Duck was assisted in an unsuccessful appeal by Belle Starr. In 1895, when he was diagnosed with tuberculosis and given only a short time to live, he was granted a pardon and released. He died shortly thereafter in Catoosa, Oklahoma, where he is buried.

== See also ==
- Blue Duck (Lonesome Dove series)
