= Scyene, Dallas =

Neighborhood in Texas, United States

Coordinates: 32.7635°N 96.6838°W

Scyene (/saɪˈiːn/ sye-EEN) was a small town in East Central Dallas County, Texas, United States, 10 mi (16 km) east-southeast of downtown Dallas. It is now a neighborhood in east Dallas, just west of Mesquite. The town's location was bounded by South Sam Houston and Cheyenne roads on the east, Military Parkway on the north, North Prairie Creek (the creek, not the road) on the west, and Bruton Road on the south. The center of the town was located at the intersection of Scyene Road and North Saint Augustine Drive (9600 Scyene Rd. & 3000 N. St. Augustine Dr.).

Scyene was officially established in 1854 when a post office was built in the city. Prior to that the town had been called either Thorpville or Prairie Creek. The town name was suggested by James Beeman with the spelling of "Seine," but residents first spelled it "Sceyne," which eventually changed to Scyene.

The town was notable for residents Jesse and Frank James, Cole and Bob Younger, and Myra Shirley, later known as Belle Starr, who moved to Scyene during the Civil War, in 1864.

At its zenith, in 1873, Scyene had a population of approximately 300, a Masonic Lodge, a wagon factory, and six saloons. That same year, however, the Texas and Pacific Railway bypassed the town due to its refusal to build a depot at its own expense, causing a slow decline of the town into today's Dallas neighborhood and giving rise to the city of Mesquite, where the railroad built its own depot.

In the mid to late 1950s, a developer built homes and shopping in the area called Riverway Estates/Bruton Terrace, named for the homes lining the water formed by the lake known as Lake June. While the dam on Prairie Creek is now open, and the bulk of the lake has dwindled, the lake still exists. The eastern portion of this development is located in what was once part of the town of Scyene. Scyene was annexed to Dallas in 1950.

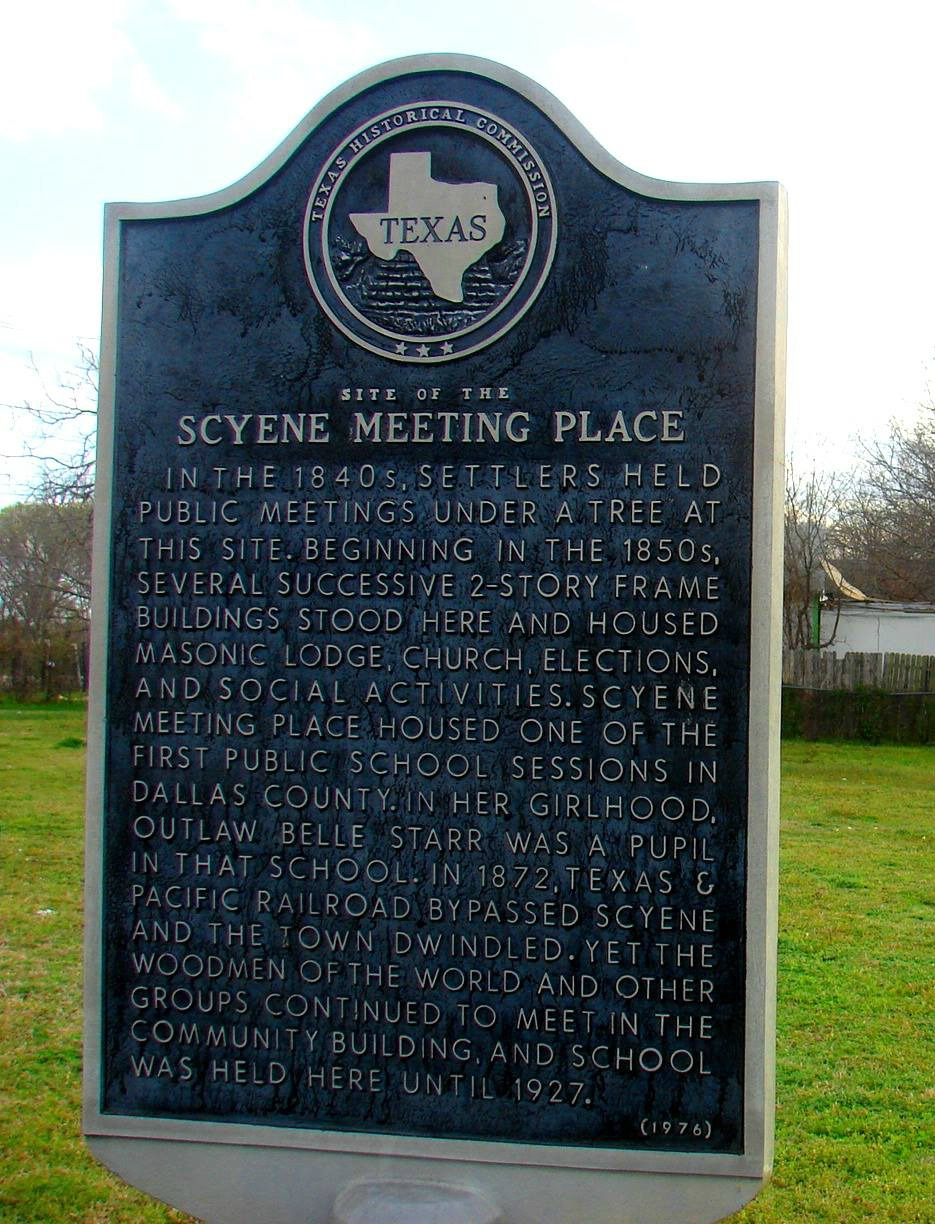
Historical Marker ~ Scyene Meeting Place

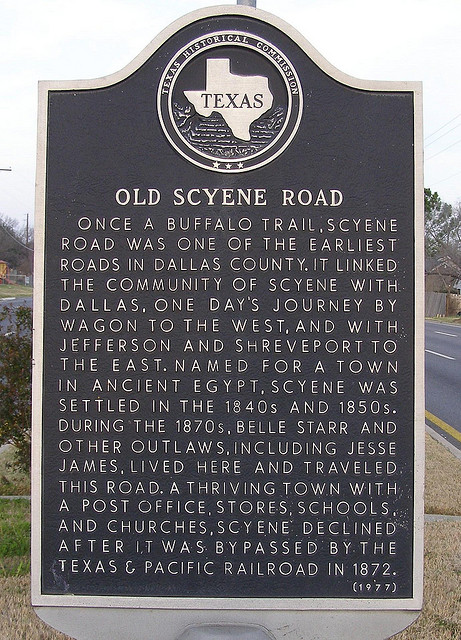
Historical Marker ~ Old Scyene Road
