= Roberta Valderrama =

Peruvian actress and improv performer (born 1977)

- Born: October 5, 1977 (age 48); Lima, Peru
- Education: Carnegie Mellon University (BFA)
- Occupations: Actor, Comedian
- Years active: 2002—present

Roberta Valderrama (born October 5, 1977) is a Peruvian actress and improv performer.

== Life and career ==
She spent her childhood in Miami, Florida and Lima, Peru. She is best known for the role of Yolanda in 10 Items or Less, a partially improvised comedy series on TBS. Yolanda is "the power behind the produce counter and the mother of Carl's child." She first appeared on television in 2000, playing Stephanie, a candy striper who stalked Erik Palladino's character on a season 7 episode of ER. She holds a BFA from the Carnegie Mellon School of Drama and has also appeared in such stage productions as Three Sisters, ‘Tis a Pity She’s a Whore, The Merchant of Venice and Grownups on the Playground. In 2009, Valderrama starred in a Funny or Die video with Dennis Kenney titled "Happy Mother's Day!!!" In 2014, Valderrama appeared in The Purge: Anarchy as the villainous Lorraine.

== Filmography ==
=== Film ===
Year	Title	Role	Notes
2002	Zig Zag	Tawny	
2005	Pure		
2007	Sweetzer	Melanie	
2009	The Lost Nomads: Get Lost!	Roberta	
2009	Hostage: A Love Story	Hostage	Short film
2010	Valentine's Day	Angry Girlfriend	
2010	Gaysharktank.com		Short film
2012	Dog Eat Dog		Short film
2013	The Callback	Lenora Cruz	Short film; also producer
2014	The Purge: Anarchy	Lorraine	
2014	Ricky Robot Arms	Allison	Short film
2017	A Million Happy Nows	Mindy	
2018	Blood Clots	Virginia	Segment: "The Call of Charlie"

=== Television ===
Year	Title	Role	Notes
2000	ER	Stephanie	Episode: "The Dance We Do"
2006-2009	10 Items or Less	Yolanda	Main role; 21 episodes
2011	Criminal Minds	Bernice	Episode: "Sense Memory"
2011	Traffic Light	Lori	Episode: "Bonebag"
2012	Co-op of the Damned	Ellen	Episode: "Rosemary's Other Baby"
2012	Bones	Renee Mitchell	Episode: "The Bod in the Pod"
2013	Shameless	Princess	Recurring role; 2 episodes
2013	Murder in Manhattan	Vicky	Television film
2014	Major Crimes	Donna Alvarado	Episode: "Trial by Fire"
2016	Still Single	Darlene Ramirez	Television film
2017	Beyond	Lydia	Episode: "Last Action Hero"
2018	Alexa & Katie	Ms. Walsh	Episode: "Winter Luau"
2019	American Princess	Areola	Recurring role; 5 episodes
2021	Sister Swap: A Hometown Holiday	Valerie Sanders	Television film
2021	Sister Swap: Christmas in the City	Valerie Sanders	Television film
2022	The Good Doctor	Candace Williams	Episode: "Rebellion"

=== Web ===
Year	Title	Role	Notes
2014	Farmed and Dangerous	Melinda Begg	Episode: "Passing the Buck"

=== Podcast ===
Year	Title	Role	Notes
2020	Cut and Run	Various	
