= Carolyn Cocca =

Carolyn Cocca is a State University of New York law professor. She published Jailbait (2004), Adolescent Sexuality (2006), Superwomen (2016) and Wonder Woman and Captain Marvel (2020). She won an Eisner Award.
