= Howie Mandel's Sunny Skies =

American comedy television series

- Genre: Sketch comedy
- Written by: Howie Mandel; Louis C.K.
- Directed by: Howie Mandel; Louis C.K. Keith Truesdell
- Starring: Howie Mandel; Stephen Furst; Tim Bagley; Deborah Theaker; Jennifer Butt; Rob Cohen
- Countries of origin: Canada; United States
- Original language: English
- No. of seasons: 1
- No. of episodes: 13

Production
- Executive producer: Howie Mandel
- Producers: Louis C.K. Nick Smith; David N. Rosen; Sandy Chanley
- Production locations: Toronto, Ontario, Canada
- Running time: 30 minutes
- Production company: Atlantis Communications

Original release
- Network: CBC Television; Showtime
- Release: 1995 – 1995

Howie Mandel's Sunny Skies is a sketch comedy television series, which aired in 1995. Produced by Atlantis Communications for Showtime in the United States and CBC Television in Canada, the series starred comedian Howie Mandel alongside a supporting cast of comedians including Stephen Furst, Tim Bagley, Deborah Theaker, Jennifer Butt and Rob Cohen.

The series also included short videos created by one of its writers, then-unknown comedian Louis C.K. Guest performers appearing on the series included Robert Smigel, Dave Foley, Gilbert Gottfried, Frankie Avalon and Moon Unit Zappa.

The show aired on Showtime in summer 1995, and was scheduled by CBC Television to premiere in September.

The series was not well-reviewed by critics, or successful in the ratings in either Canada or the United States. Showtime aired all 13 episodes, but in Canada CBC Television cut the series after five episodes and scheduled the remainder for a burn-off run in summer 1996. Neither network renewed the series for a second season.

Mandel garnered a CableACE Award nomination for Best Actor in a Comedy Series at the 17th CableACE Awards.
