= Kirsten Gronfield =

American improv comedy actress (born 1977)

- Born: Kirsten Gronfield; November 29, 1977 (age 48); Plymouth, Minnesota, U.S.
- Occupation: Actress/Comedian
- Years active: 2004–present

Kirsten Gronfield (born November 29, 1977) is an American improv comedy actress.

== Career ==
Gronfield trained with the famed improv company Groundlings. She has worked with troupes such as Accelerator, Toby St. Claire’s Comedy Extravaganza, Secret Improv Society, Comic Sutra and Traveling Improv Troupe. Her film credits include lead roles in Steve Saves L.A., The Caller, Yours, Mine & Ours and The Battle and Other Shorts, as well as a supporting role in Wish You Were Here. Gronfield starred, as Ingrid Wakowski, in the TBS television series 10 Items or Less from 2006 to 2009.
