= Jim Reed (outlaw) =

American outlaw

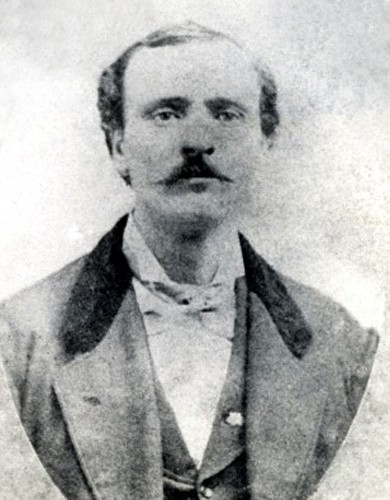
- Born: James C. Reed c. 1845
- Died: August 1874 (aged 28–29); Paris, Texas
- Cause of death: Gunshot wound
- Organizations: Quantrill's Raiders; Sam Starr's gang
- Spouse: Belle Starr
- Children: Rosie Lee; James Edwin Reed

James C. Reed, known as Jim Reed (c. 1845 – 1874), was a member of the Quantrill's Raiders during the American Civil War, along with the James brothers (Jesse and Frank) and the Youngers (Jim, John, Bob and Cole). He was killed by a deputy sheriff in Paris, Texas in 1874.

Belle Starr's brother, John Allison "Bud" Shirley, fought alongside Jim Reed in Quantrill's Raiders and Belle met Reed during this period. Some of the raiders formed what became known as the James–Younger Gang and the Shirley family moved to Texas. After a 1866 bank robbery in Missouri, some of the gang hid out on the Shirleys' Texas ranch and Starr and Reed became reacquainted. Belle Shirley and Reed were married on November 1, 1866 in Collin County, Texas. They had a child in 1868 they named Rosie Lee (known as Pearl Starr). The couple broke up when Reed met a woman named Rosa McCommas.

Jim Reed appears in the videogame Call of Juarez: Gunslinger (2013), where he is revenged by Silas Greaves.
