= John Lehr =

American actor

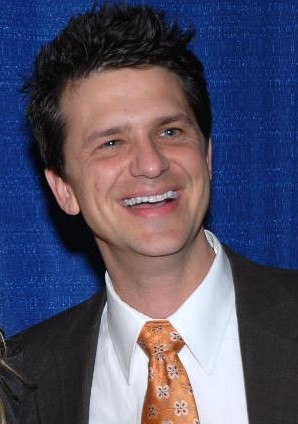
- Born: November 25, 1965 (age 60); Overland Park, Kansas, U.S.
- Occupations: Actor, comedian
- Years active: 1991–present
- Spouse: Jennifer Schlosberg Lehr (m. 2001)
- Children: 2
- Relatives: Carl Schlosberg

John Lehr (born November 25, 1965) is an American film and television actor and comedian.

== Personal life ==
Lehr was born on November 25, 1965, in Overland Park, Kansas. He went to high school at Shawnee Mission West High. He graduated from Northwestern University in 1988. While attending Northwestern, he worked as a substitute teacher at Kilmer Elementary School on the North Side of Chicago, Illinois. He later received his teaching certificate and taught full time at Kilmer Elementary.

Lehr converted to Judaism in 2000.

Lehr appeared in the movie The Sweetest Thing, starring Christina Applegate, as a man driving a golf cart on a driving range being hit by balls. He is credited as "Ralph".

In 2010, Lehr signed on as a supporter of Alley Cat Allies, a non-profit advocacy organization dedicated to transforming communities to protect and improve the lives of cats, joking that “As a feral human, I feel a deep connection with these animals.”

== Stagework ==
Lehr is an alumnus of Mee-Ow, an improv group at Northwestern University. In 2004, his one-man shows, The Lehr Curse: A Series of Comedic Lectures ran Off-Broadway.

== Sitcom career ==
Lehr is also a co-creator, executive producer, and star of the Hulu-original series Quick Draw, which premiered in August 2013. The second season premiered in August 2014.

In 2011, Lehr co-created the web series Jailbait which premiered on April 1, 2011, on Crackle.com

Lehr is the co-creator and star of the TBS television series 10 Items or Less, which premiered in November 2006. Lehr is also an executive producer and writer for the show. The second season premiered in January 2008, and season three premiered in January 2009.

Before 10 Items, he played Christina Applegate's brother in Jesse during its first season (1998) and also appeared in Friends, in the 1996 episode "The One with the Flashback", as Eric.

In 2015, he was reported to be working on a new show for the cable channel HBO called, The Loop, about a couple who decides to give up the daily grind and sail around the world. Soon they get caught accidentally with a drug smuggling ring, and things go downhill from there. Lehr and producing partner Nancy Hower shot a pilot presentation, which was not ordered to series.

== Television commercials ==
=== Geico ===
Lehr played one of the GEICO Cavemen in a popular series of commercials for the auto insurance company GEICO. Other actors in the commercials were Jeffrey Daniel Phillips and Ben Weber.

Lehr appeared in the first ad, in which the caveman is a worker holding a boom mike on the set of a television commercial. He gets upset about the tenor of the commercial and its demeaning comments about cavemen, and storms off the set.

In a later ad, he plays a caveman being counseled by a therapist played by Talia Shire.

In a February 2009 interview on Anytime with Bob Kushell, Lehr stated that the caveman makeup took about three hours to apply.
