= Jailbait (book) =

2004 non-fiction book by Carolyn Cocca

- Author: Carolyn Cocca
- Publisher: State University of New York Press
- Publication date: 2004
- ISBN: 9780791459065

Jailbait: The Politics of Statutory Rape Laws in the United States is a 2004 non-fiction book by Carolyn Cocca, published by the State University of New York Press. It discusses the ages of consent in the United States.

Chapter 1 analyzes the general history of statutory rape policies in the U.S., while Chapters 2, 3, and 4 discuss how states revised and adopted the laws in the 1970s, 1980s, and 1990s. Each of the three other chapters discusses a particular aspect of the revisions and adoptions: Respectively, they are the age revisions, gender-neutral language, and revisions related to 1990s social welfare policies concerning teenage pregnancy, race, and deadbeat fathers.

== Reception ==
Donald P. Haider-Markel of the University of Kansas concluded that the book is "a thoughtful and engaging book that connects a variety of theoretical perspectives and makes use of multiple methodological approaches in a coherent manner." He argued that the book would be good for classes on public policy at the undergraduate and graduate levels. He added that he believed Cocca had overstated several of her arguments, such as those about the role of interest groups and the use of statutory rape laws as "morality politics".
