= Jailbait (web series) =

- Genre: Comedy
- Created by: John Lehr and Nancy Hower
- Starring: John Lehr
- Country of origin: United States
- Original language: English
- No. of seasons: 1
- No. of episodes: 10

Production
- Production locations: Los Angeles, California
- Running time: 5 minutes

Original release
- Network: Crackle
- Release: April 1, 2011

Jailbait is an American improvised comedy web series starring John Lehr as Oswald "Ozzie" O'Connor, a guy who accidentally buys drugs in a sting operation and is sent to prison. Ten episodes premiered on April 1, 2011 on Crackle It was not renewed for a second season.
