= Quick Draw (TV series) =

2010s American TV series

- Genre: Comedy, Western
- Created by: Nancy Hower; John Lehr
- Starring: John Lehr
- Country of origin: United States
- Original language: English
- No. of seasons: 2
- No. of episodes: 18

Production
- Executive producers: Nancy Hower; John Lehr
- Camera setup: Single-camera
- Running time: 22 minutes
- Production company: Howler Monkey Productions

Original release
- Network: Hulu
- Release: August 5, 2013 – October 2, 2014

Quick Draw is a Western comedy television series created by Nancy Hower and John Lehr for Hulu. Lehr stars in and Hower directs this partly improvised half-hour comedy Western. The show follows Harvard graduate John Henry Hoyle who becomes the sheriff of Great Bend, Kansas, in 1875.

The show marks Hulu's third foray into original scripted programming. It premiered online on August 5, 2013.

== Overview ==
Fresh off the stagecoach from Harvard, Sheriff John Henry Hoyle and his reluctant Deputy Eli introduce the emerging science of forensics to hunt down the Wild West's most dangerous criminals.

== Cast and characters ==
- John Lehr as Sheriff John Henry Hoyle, Harvard graduate
- Nick Brown as Deputy Eli Brocias
- Allison Dunbar as Honey Shaw
- Alexia Dox as Pearl Starr
- Bob Clendenin as Vernon Shank
- Brian O'Connor as Cole Younger

== Production ==
On April 30, 2013, Hulu announced two new original television series, The Awesomes and Quick Draw. On August 5, Hulu debuted the first two episodes of Quick Draw. On November 4, 2013, Hulu announced it would renew the show for a ten-episode second season, which began on August 7, 2014.

== Episodes ==
Season	Episodes	Originally released	
Season	Episodes	First released	Last released
1	8	August 5, 2013	September 16, 2013
Webisodes	8	August 5, 2013	September 16, 2013
2	10	August 7, 2014	October 2, 2014

=== Season 1 (2013) ===
No. overall	No. in season	Title	Original release date
1	1	"Murder at the Webb Ranch"	August 5, 2013
Sheriff John Henry Hoyle attempts to use his state-of-the-art forensics training from Harvard to solve a rancher's murder.
2	2	"The Legend of Belle Starr"	August 5, 2013
Hoyle's old school chum from Harvard, Xavier (Robert Cuthill) arrives in town to open a new bank. After Frank James attempts to rob the bank, Hoyle and Eli apprehend Frank's girlfriend, Pearl Starr (Alexia Dox), who just might have a secret link to Hoyle's past.
3	3	"Mail Order Bride"	August 12, 2013
A mail order bride comes to Great Bend.
4	4	"Expert Witness"	August 19, 2013
Sheriff John Henry Hoyle presents testimony in a criminal case, utilizing expertise gleaned from his studies at Harvard University in Cambridge, Massachusetts.
5	5	"Temperance"	August 26, 2013
Sheriff John Henry Hoyle weighs competing interests using a specialized interest-weighting algorithm he developed during his time at Harvard.
6	6	"Nicodemus"	September 2, 2013
Sheriff and Harvard man John Henry Hoyle visits a nearby town.
7	7	"Honey's Beau"	September 9, 2013
Sheriff John Henry Hoyle fights a duel.
8	8	"The Railroad Spur"	September 16, 2013
Sheriff Hoyle and Eli use trigonometry (learned by Hoyle at Harvard University) to determine that murderers were on Mayor Dodge's property. Hoyle, Eli, Mayor Dodge, and school teacher, Mr. Tidwell, stand in for Prostitute/Hoyle's step-daughter, Pearl, as Honey's girls'.

=== Webisodes ===
No.	Title	Original release date
1	"Mixology 1: Whiskey Skin"	August 5, 2013
2	"Mixology 2: Gin & Pine"	August 5, 2013
3	"Mixology 3: A Splitting Headache"	August 12, 2013
4	"Mixology 4: Sleeper"	August 19, 2013
5	"Mixology 5: Black Stripe"	August 26, 2013
6	"Mixology 6: Santina's Pousse Cafe"	September 2, 2013
7	"Mixology 7: Badminton"	September 9, 2013
8	"Mixology 8: Whiskey Cobbler"	September 16, 2013

=== Season 2 (2014) ===
No. overall	No. in season	Title	Original release date
9	1	"Wedding Bells"	August 7, 2014
Hoyle and the gang race to rescue one of their own after a kidnapping by the vengeful Cole Younger.
10	2	"Deacon Jim"	August 7, 2014
Hoyle must quell the rampage of an angry town after a stray bullet claims the life of a beloved friend.
11	3	"Chinatown"	August 14, 2014
Hoyle and Wanda follow the trail of an opium gang after a train happens to run over a rival dealer.
12	4	"The Grasshopper Plague"	August 21, 2014
Eli finds farming more than it's cracked up to be when an infestation devastates his entire crop.
13	5	"The Tale of Edwin Starr"	August 28, 2014
Pearl must face her past when a mysterious visitor threatens to derail the "straight and narrow" life she's built for herself.
14	6	"Nicodemus Reloaded"	September 4, 2014
When a cattle drive doesn't go as expected, Hoyle enters Eli in a rodeo to win enough money to pay off the debts on his family's failed farm.
15	7	"Election Night"	September 11, 2014
Great Bend's race for mayor heats up when a rival campaign manager ends up dead.
16	8	"Up Staged"	September 18, 2014
Hoyle and Eli race to track down Cole Younger before he slips out of their grasp for good.
17	9	"Something About Myra"	September 25, 2014
Honey comes to grips with her feelings for Hoyle when a romantic connection from his past jeopardizes their budding relationship.
18	10	"Doomed!"	October 2, 2014
The fearsome Starr clan descends on Great Bend to wreak havoc and mayhem on anyone who stands in their way.
