= Pearl Starr =

American businesswoman

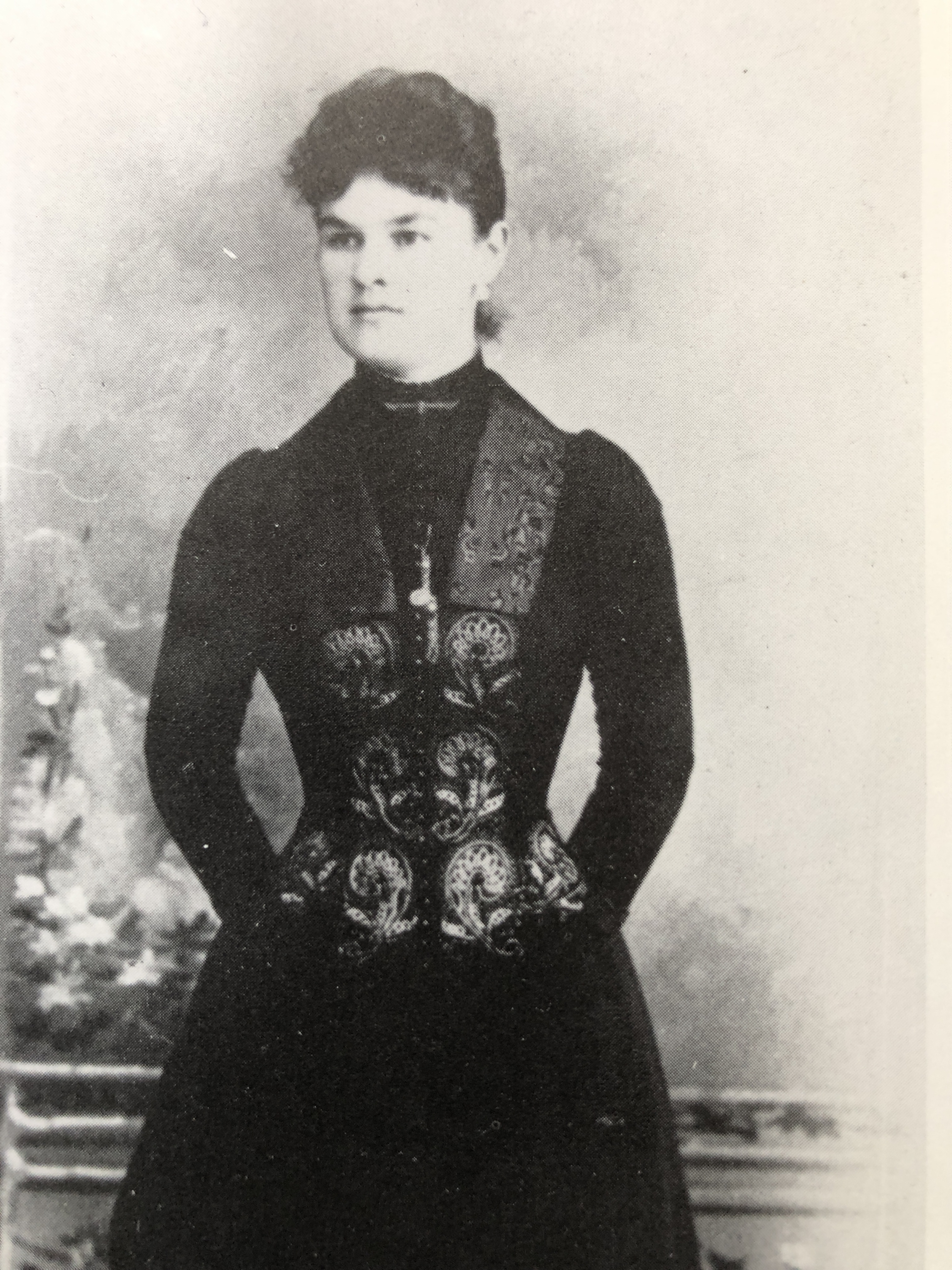
- Pearl Starr in the 1880s
- Born: Rosie Lee Reed; September 1868; Rich Hill, Missouri, US
- Died: July 6, 1925 (aged 56); Douglas, Arizona, US
- Occupations: Prostitute, brothel madam
- Parents: Jim Reed (father); Belle Starr (mother)

Rosie Lee Reed (September 1868 – July 6, 1925), better known as Pearl Starr, was an American bordello owner and businesswoman in Arkansas, the first child of Belle Starr, the reputed "Bandit Queen" of the American Old West. Her father was either Jim Reed, Belle's first husband, or Cole Younger, a famous outlaw associated with the James–Younger Gang.

== Early life ==
Pearl Starr was born in Rich Hill, Missouri. As a small child, she moved often before her outlaw father died in a gunfight when she was six. Her mother then married a Cherokee named Sam Starr, and settled beside the Canadian River in the Indian Territory at a place called Younger's Bend. Starr was 21 when her mother Belle Starr was murdered.

Belle Starr claimed that Pearl was the daughter of the outlaw Cole Younger. While no official record exists, pictures of a young Pearl Starr show an uncanny resemblance to Cole Younger. Her parentage always may be in doubt.

Most historical writers accept that Starr gave birth to an illegitimate daughter named Flossie in April 1887 when she was 18. Belle Starr sent her daughter to relatives to have her baby.

In 1888, Pearl Starr's brother Edwin was found in possession of stolen property and was shot by his accomplice. What became of Starr's daughter is unknown, but in the summer of 1888, Pearl Starr returned alone to her mother's house at Younger's Bend to care for her brother.

== Prostitution ==
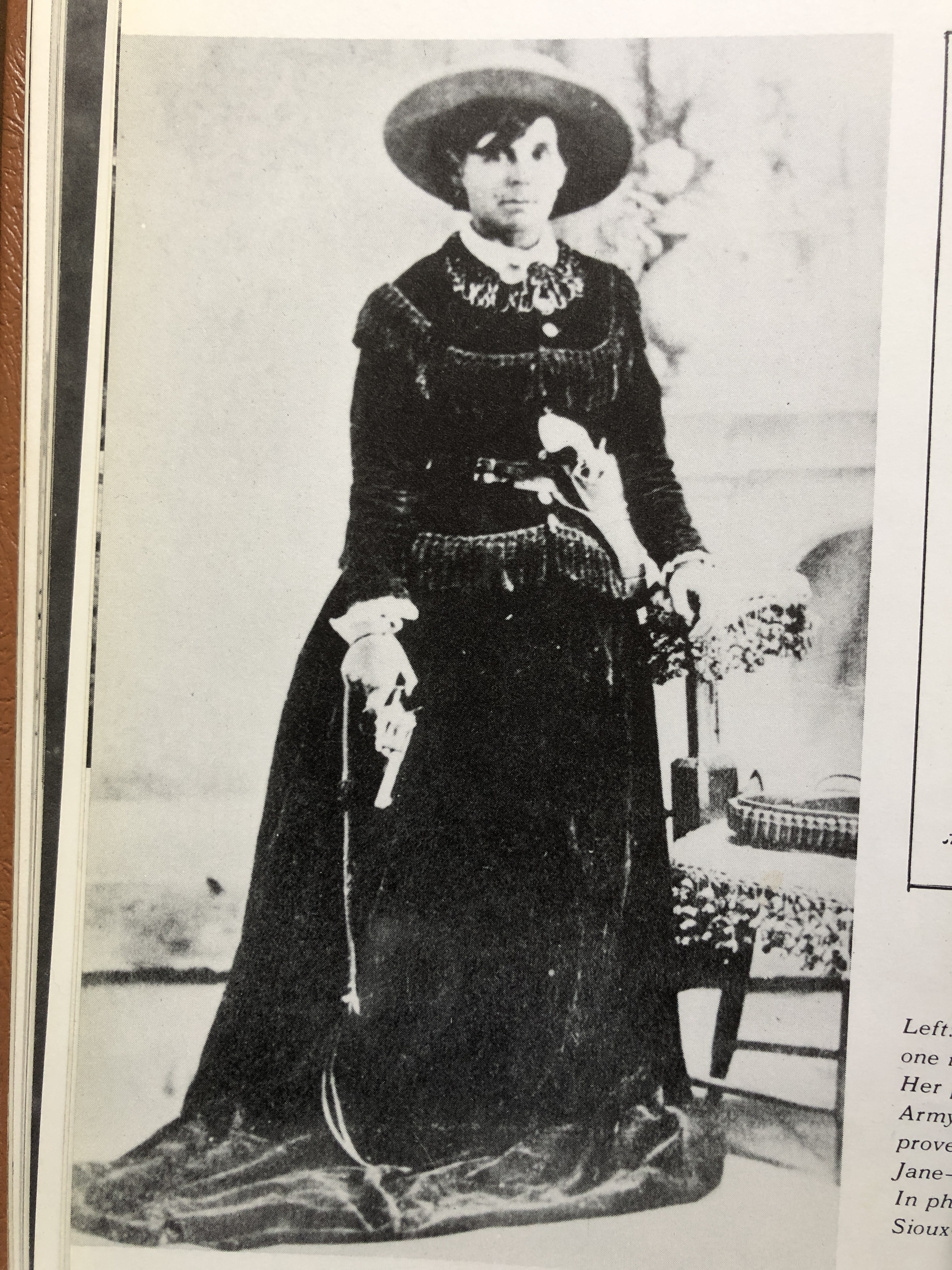
Belle Starr, Pearl Starr's mother, in 1887 at Fort Smith

Edwin's case went to trial in July 1889. He was found guilty and sent to prison. About this time, Starr married Will Harrison, but the couple were divorced in 1891. Capitalizing on the dime novel fame of Belle, Pearl Reed changed her name to Pearl Starr at this time. She became a prostitute in Van Buren, Arkansas ostensibly to make money for the purpose of getting her brother out of prison. She eventually put together a defense team that managed to secure a presidential pardon for Edwin in 1893.

Starr moved to Fort Smith, Arkansas and established her own bordello. Located on "the Row," Fort Smith's waterfront street of gambling halls, saloons and bordellos, the house was identified with a bright red star surrounded by lighted pearls. The parlor featured a talented piano player, good whiskey, and supposedly the "most beautiful girls west of the Mississippi." Business prospered, and Pearl purchased additional brothels as well as investing in saloons and other property.

Starr had another illegitimate daughter in 1894 and named her Ruth. Starr married Arthur Erbach in 1897 and had a son with him in 1898. Her new husband and son died of malaria within a year's time. Both are buried in the Oak Cemetery in Fort Smith. By 1902, she was living with Dell Andrews and, though not married to him, had another daughter, Jennette, in November.

The only time Starr was implicated in a crime was in 1911. After a burglary at a general merchandise store in Fort Smith, police found several stolen items hidden at Starr's Winslow home. She was found guilty of robbery and sentenced to a year in the Arkansas State Penitentiary. Posting $2,000 bail, Starr's attorneys appealed the case to the Arkansas Supreme Court, which overturned the verdict.

== Last years ==
In 1916, the city of Fort Smith enacted ordinances making prostitution illegal. For some time, Starr's activities were overlooked, but she eventually was arrested. The charges were dropped on the understanding that Starr would leave the community. In 1921, at age 53, she left for Douglas, Arizona. She died there on July 6, 1925 and was buried in Calvary Cemetery.

== Flossie Starr's account ==
Starr's daughter Flossie was credited with writing a two-part article for the Dallas Morning News Sunday editions on April 30 and May 7, 1933. According to these articles, Starr fully believed that her brother Edwin, always resentful of his mother's attention to Pearl Starr, was their mother's killer, but was never able to prove it.

== Bibliography ==
- Green, Carl R.; Sanford, William R. (2008). Belle Starr. Enslow Publishers, Inc. ISBN 9780766031760.
- Logsdon, Guy (1995). The Whorehouse Bells Were Ringing and Other Songs Cowboys Sing. University of Illinois Press. ISBN 9780252064883.
- Rascoe, Burton (2004). Belle Starr: "the Bandit Queen". U of Nebraska Press. ISBN 9780803290037.
- Rutter, Michael (2012). Upstairs Girls: Prostitution in the American West. Farcountry Press. ISBN 9781560375425.
- Shirley, Glenn (2014). Belle Starr and Her Times: The Literature, the Facts, and the Legends. University of Oklahoma Press. ISBN 9780806170770.
- Shropshire, Lola (1998). Fort Smith and Sebastian County. Arcadia Publishing. ISBN 9780738597041.
- Steele, Philip W. (1989). STARR TRACKS: Belle and Pearl Starr. Pelican Publishing Company. ISBN 9781455612420.
- Whayne, Jeannie M. (2000). Arkansas Biography: A Collection of Notable Lives. University of Arkansas Press. ISBN 9781557285874.
