= 10 Items or Less (TV series) =

- Genre: Sitcom; Mockumentary
- Created by: Nancy Hower; John Lehr; Robert Hickey
- Directed by: Nancy Hower
- Starring: John Lehr; Bob Clendenin; Jennifer Elise Cox; Greg Davis Jr.; Chris Payne Gilbert; Kirsten Gronfield; Christopher Liam Moore; Roberta Valderrama
- Composer: Steven Argila
- Country of origin: United States
- Original language: English
- No. of seasons: 3
- No. of episodes: 21

Production
- Executive producers: Nancy Hower; John Lehr; Robert Hickey
- Camera setup: Single-camera
- Running time: 20–22 minutes
- Production companies: Howler Monkey Productions; Sony Pictures Television

Original release
- Network: TBS
- Release: November 27, 2006 – February 24, 2009

10 Items or Less is an American comedy television series created by Nancy Hower, Robert Hickey, and John Lehr. Partly scripted and partly improvised, the show starred Lehr as a less-than-successful businessman who returned home to run Greens & Grains, the family-owned supermarket, upon the death of his father.

The series debuted on TBS on November 27, 2006. During its first season, it aired Monday nights at 11 p.m. ET/PT. The second and third seasons aired on Tuesday nights at 11 p.m. ET/PT. In November 2009, a blog posting stated the show had been cancelled and would not be picked up for the fourth season.

In 2015, the series was made available on Crackle.

== Summary ==
The series stars John Lehr as a failed New York City businessman who moves back to his hometown of Dayton, Ohio to take over the family supermarket following the death of his father. The show is set in the fictional supermarket known as Greens & Grains, located at 5th Street and Tiberius.

== Characters ==
- Leslie Pool (John Lehr) – the owner and manager of Greens & Grains. Leslie brings his oblivious yet lovable management style to the Greens & Grains grocery store he inherits after his father's death.
- Amy Anderson (Jennifer Elise Cox) – The first and second season manager of Super Value Mart, the G&G's number one competitor from across the street. Amy went to high school with Leslie.
- Mercy P. Jones (Kim Coles) – The third season manager of Super Value Mart. She is ultra-competitive, and trying to put the G&G's out-of-business at all cost.
- Ingrid Wakowski (Kirsten Gronfield) – Ingrid is the quirky, soft-spoken customer service representative who lives for Renaissance festivals.
- Yolanda Nelson (Roberta Valderrama) – The straight talking dominant force behind the produce department.
- Todd Sykes (Chris Payne Gilbert) – Todd, the butcher who hopes to be a NASCAR driver.
- Carl Dawson (Bob Clendenin) – Carl is the sweet doofus stockboy with a huge crush on Yolanda.
- Richard Mednick (Christopher Liam Moore) – Richard is a dignified cashier who dreams of becoming a professional figure skater.
- Buchwald "Buck" Washington (Greg Davis Jr.) – Buck is a checkout bagger who is looking towards the future of becoming a doctor by attending night school.

== Production ==
A detailed script was written for each episode outlining the overall story arc. However, the script was not shown to the actors; instead they were provided with a loose outline of the plot, often finding out about it as they filmed. All dialogue in the show is improvised spontaneously by the actors on the set. A typical 22-minute episode was edited-down from roughly 30 hours of raw improvised dialogue and scenes. John Lehr has described their production style as "similar to Spinal Tap." At one point during the first season, the actors demanded to see the script, but upon receiving it they decided as a group that they did not want to see the scripts again in the future.

The series was filmed in a real grocery store called "Jon's" in Reseda, California (formerly Vons), often with actual customers used as extras.

== Episodes ==
=== Season 1 (2006) ===
No. overall	No. in season	Title	Directed by	Written by	Original release date	Prod. code
1	1	"The New Boss"	Nancy Hower	Robert Hickey, Nancy Hower & John Lehr	27 November 2006	101
When Leslie's father passes away, he moves back to Ohio to run the family's business, the Greens & Grains supermarket. To Leslie's surprise, Amy Anderson, the manager of the competitor Super Value Mart, tries to close a deal she made with Leslie's dad to buy Greens & Grains from Leslie.
2	2	"The Miracle Worker"	Nancy Hower	Robert Hickey, Nancy Hower & John Lehr	4 December 2006	102
When he discovers a stain on one of the walls that resembles Jesus, Leslie markets the stain as a miracle to get more customers into the store. Meanwhile, Carl wants to see his son, Manuelito.
3	3	"Health Insurance"	Nancy Hower	Robert Hickey, Nancy Hower & John Lehr	11 December 2006	103
Leslie announces that Greens & Grains is having some financial difficulties and must eliminate health insurance all together or fire one employee.
4	4	"What Women Want"	Nancy Hower	Robert Hickey, Nancy Hower & John Lehr	18 December 2006	104
Leslie wants to join the Bisons, a high society social club, and plans on attending an event to make sure he gets in. But, because the Bisons are big on pairs, he first needs to find a date.
5	5	"Bag It"	Nancy Hower	Robert Hickey, Nancy Hower & John Lehr	25 December 2006	105
Greens & Grains agrees to go head to head in a bagging competition with Super Value Mart. Leslie however does not realize that Buck, the store's best bagger, has given up bagging competitions.

=== Season 2 (2008) ===
No. overall	No. in season	Title	Directed by	Written by	Original release date	Prod. code
6	1	"Dollar Day Afternoon"	Nancy Hower	Robert Hickey, Nancy Hower & John Lehr	15 January 2008	203
Leslie comes up with a plan to bring in more customers through a "free money giveaway." Meanwhile, in a failed robbery attempt, the G&G crew is taken hostage in the store and Ingrid develops Stockholm syndrome. Eventually the robbers are thwarted, but only after Leslie is shot.
7	2	"Forever Young"	Nancy Hower	Robert Hickey, Nancy Hower & John Lehr	22 January 2008	205
Leslie is devastated to learn that Buck and Amy slept together after being drunk at a club one night. Convinced Amy would go for him if he were young like Buck, Leslie resolves to "hip" himself up and snags a make out sessions of his own with Amy.
8	3	"To Heir Is Human"	Nancy Hower	Robert Hickey, Nancy Hower & John Lehr	29 January 2008	201
As Leslie remembers his father Bud on the one year anniversary of his death, he realizes there is no one to continue the legacy of G&G. He decides to find an "heir" to take over when he dies.
9	4	"First Time"	Nancy Hower	Robert Hickey, Nancy Hower & John Lehr	5 February 2008	202
Ingrid decides that its time to lose her virginity and tries to find a suitor to help her.
10	5	"The Bromance"	Nancy Hower	Robert Hickey, Nancy Hower & John Lehr	12 February 2008	204
Todd wins some cows in a poker game and pitches Leslie the idea that they could use the cows to sell "the freshest meat in town".
11	6	"Amy Strikes Back"	Nancy Hower	Robert Hickey, Nancy Hower & John Lehr	19 February 2008	206
When Amy loses her job at the SuperValueMart, Leslie decides to hire her as Greens & Grains' new assistant manager, to the horror of the rest of the staff.
12	7	"Illegal Alien"	Nancy Hower	Robert Hickey, Nancy Hower & John Lehr	26 February 2008	207
After a calendar shoot, which Ingrid was chosen as cover model, Amy overhears that Ingrid is an illegal alien from Poland. When an attempt to have her arrested fails, Amy calls INS which eventually lands everyone in jail. Amy is the only one unable to make bail, and Leslie decides to sponsor Ingrid's citizenship.
13	8	"The Ren Fair"	Nancy Hower	Robert Hickey, Nancy Hower & John Lehr	4 March 2008	208
The Greens & Grains grocery store is celebrating Renaissance Days, wherein the staff dresses in 15th century garb.

=== Season 3 (2009) ===
No. overall	No. in season	Title	Directed by	Written by	Original release date	Prod. code
14	1	"Turkey Bowling"	Nancy Hower	Nancy Hower & John Lehr	6 January 2009	301
Todd and Carl create a new grocery store bowling game using frozen turkeys. Leslie becomes obsessed with the game. The new Super Value Mart store manager, Mercy P. Jones, bets Leslie he can't throw 3,000 frames without leaving a single pin standing and gambling fever takes over the store.
15	2	"Eye Can See Clearly"	Nancy Hower	Nancy Hower & John Lehr	13 January 2009	304
Leslie's decision to start an eye exam clinic in Greens & Grains sets off a chain of events that results in Leslie going blind, which forces him to live with Yolanda.
16	3	"Star Trok"	Nancy Hower	Nancy Hower & John Lehr	20 January 2009	303
Leslie holds a Star Trok convention. When Jolene Blalock of Star Trek: Enterprise shows up for her celebrity appearance, an exploding refrigerator compressor leaves her trapped in close quarters with Leslie and Ingrid.
17	4	"One Day at a Time"	Nancy Hower	Nancy Hower & John Lehr	27 January 2009	306
Leslie is convinced to help Richard's mother overcome her alcohol problems when she is caught shoplifting liquor from the store.
18	5	"The Whistler"	Nancy Hower	Nancy Hower & John Lehr	3 February 2009	305
After being humiliated by Super Value Mart, Leslie decides to put his whistling talent to good use and gets air play for his tunes.
19	6	"The Milk Man"	Nancy Hower	Nancy Hower & John Lehr	10 February 2009	307
Leslie complains about getting too many expired milk jugs and runs up against the dreaded Dairy Consortium. Soon, Greens & Grains is completely depleted of dairy products, and it appears Leslie's life is in danger.
20	7	"Dances with Groceries"	Nancy Hower	Nancy Hower & John Lehr	17 February 2009	308
Leslie discovers his great, great, great grandfather was a Native American and decides to make contact with the local Shawnee Indian tribe in an attempt to connect with his heritage.
21	8	"Sesquicentennial"	Nancy Hower	Nancy Hower & John Lehr	24 February 2009	302
Leslie celebrates the store's 150th anniversary by doing everything the old-fashioned way; Ingrid dates a man who may not be what he appears to be.

== Home media ==
Title	Region 1
The Complete First and Second Seasons	December 30, 2008
The Complete Third Season	May 1, 2012
