= Hole-in-the-Wall Gang =

Wild West criminal gang

- Founding location: Hole-in-the-Wall, Big Horn Mountains, Johnson County, Wyoming
- Years active: 1880s–1890s
- Territory: Northern Wyoming
- Ethnicity: White-American
- Membership (est.): 9
- Criminal activities: Horse and cattle theft, stagecoach and highway robbery, store and bank robbery

The Hole-in-the-Wall Gang was a gang in the American Wild West, which took its name from the Hole-in-the-Wall Pass in Johnson County, Wyoming, where several outlaw gangs had their hideouts.

== Description ==
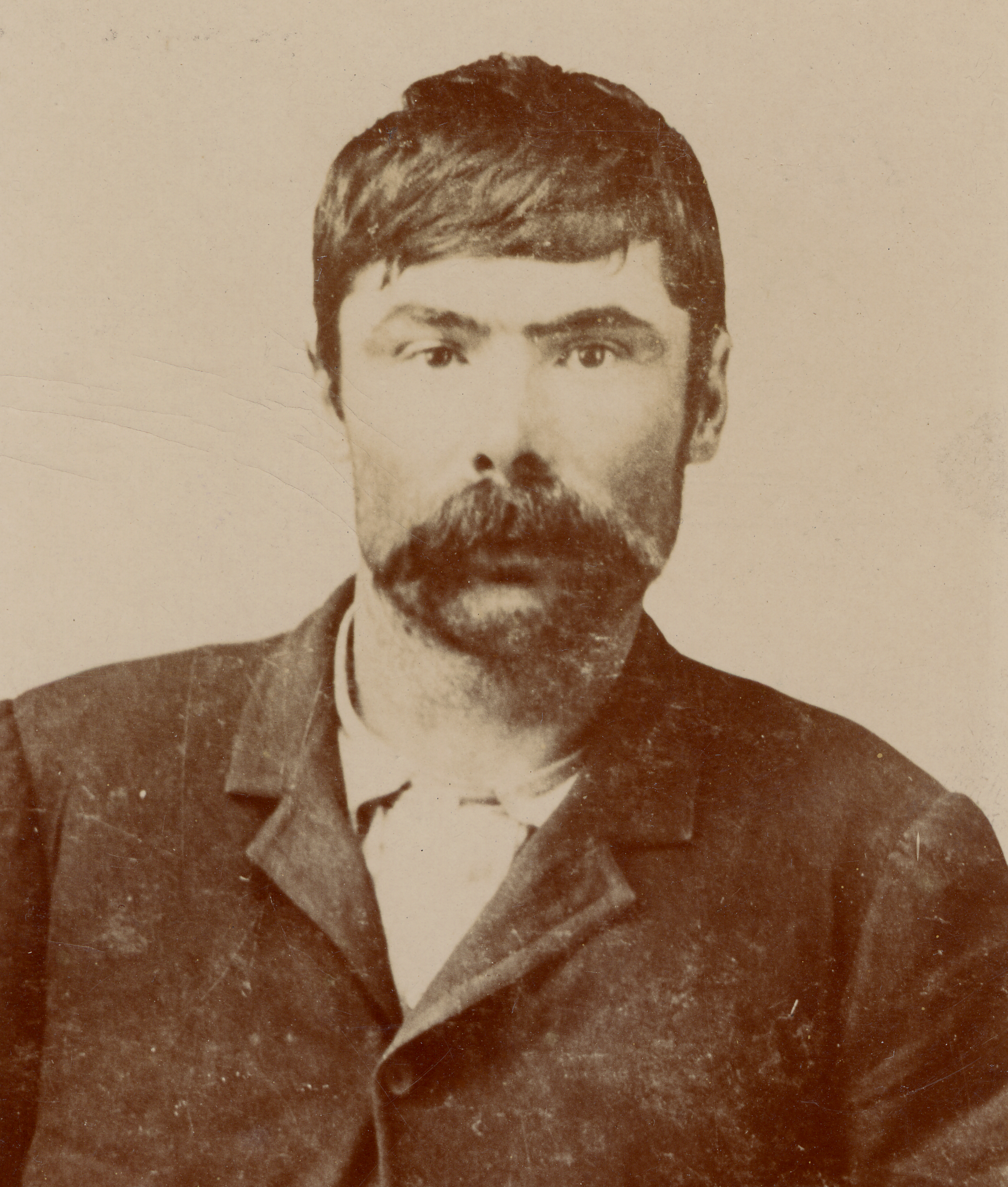
Tom O'Day, alias Joe Chancellor, member of the Hole-in-the-Wall Gang

The Hole-in-the-Wall Gang was not simply one large organized gang of outlaws but rather was made up of several separate gangs, all operating out of the Hole-in-the-Wall Pass, using it as their base of operations. The gangs formed a coalition, each planning and carrying out its own robberies with very little interaction with the others. At times, members of one gang would ride along with other gangs, but usually each gang operated separately, meeting up only when they were each at the hideout at the same time.

Geographically, the hideout had all the advantages needed for a gang attempting to evade the authorities. It was easily defended and impossible for lawmen to access without detection by the outlaws concealed there. It contained an infrastructure, with each gang supplying its own food and livestock, as well as its own horses. A corral, livery stable, and numerous cabins were constructed, one or two for each gang. Anyone operating out of there adhered to certain rules of the camp, including a certain way of handling disputes with other gang members, and never stealing from another gang's supplies. There was no leader, with each gang adhering to its own chain of command. The hideout was also used for shelter and a place for the outlaws to lay up during the harsh Wyoming winters.

Members of the Hole-in-the-Wall Gang included such infamous criminals as Butch Cassidy's Wild Bunch which consisted of Butch Cassidy (also known as Robert Leroy Parker), the Sundance Kid (also known as Harry A. Longabaugh), Elzy Lay, Tall Texan, 'News' Carver, Camilla 'Deaf Charlie' Hanks, Laura Bullion, George "Flat Nose" Curry, Harvey 'Kid Curry' Logan, Bob Meeks, Kid Curry's brother Lonny Curry, Bob Smith, Al Smith, Bob Taylor, Tom O'Day, 'Laughing' Sam Carey, Black Jack Ketchum, and the Roberts Brothers, along with several lesser known outlaw gangs of the Old West. Jesse James was also mentioned to have visited the Hole-in-the-Wall hideout.

In 1899, after the Wilcox train robbery by the Hole-in-the Wall Gang, Pinkerton detectives were deployed. Charlie Siringo was one of them. Siringo wrote of the gang, "Alma being the southern rendezvous for the 'Wild Bunch', while Hole-in-the-Wall, in Wyoming, was their northern hang out."

Several posses trailed outlaws to the location, and there were several shootouts as posses attempted to enter, all resulting in the posses being repulsed, and being forced to withdraw. No lawmen ever successfully entered it to capture outlaws during its more than fifty years of active existence, nor were any lawmen attempting to infiltrate it by use of undercover techniques successful.

The encampment operated with a steady stream of outlaw gangs rotating in and out, from the late 1860s to the early 20th century. However, by 1910, very few outlaws used the hideout, and it eventually faded into history. One of the cabins used by Butch Cassidy still exists today, and it was moved to Cody, Wyoming, where it is on public display.

== In popular culture ==
The Hole-in-the-Wall Gang has been featured in various works, including:

- Western fiction films:
  - The Maverick Queen (1956), starring Barbara Stanwyck in the title role of Kit Banion, a saloon-keeper in league with Butch Cassidy and the Wild Bunch. Howard Petrie portrays Butch Cassidy and Scott Brady plays Sundance.
  - The Three Outlaws (1956), starring Neville Brand as Butch Cassidy and Alan Hale Jr as the Sundance Kid, and depicting the duo's exploits (with Wild Bunch member William "News" Carver as the third outlaw of the title)
  - Cat Ballou (1965), western comedy starring Jane Fonda (as the heroine of the title) and Lee Marvin, in a gang who rob a train, providing adequate motivation for an expedition against not only them but everyone at Hole-in-the-Wall, forcing the remnant of aged outlaws there to eject her from the refuge
  - Butch Cassidy and the Sundance Kid (1969), starring Paul Newman and Robert Redford, film dramatization of the historical outlaws
- "The Good, the Bad, and the Tigger", animated parody (in the series The New Adventures of Winnie the Pooh) of the historical and dramatized gangs, with outlaws "Pooh" and "Tigger" being referred to as the "Hole in the Head Gang"
- In the Scooby-Doo! Mystery Adventures game Showdown in Ghost Town, which takes place in the fictional Western ghost town of Los Burritos, multiple references are made to the "Brick-in-the-Wall Gang", an apparent play on the Hole-in-the-Wall Gang's name. The fictitious gang takes its name from stealing large amounts of gold bullion and disguising them as bricks in gang-owned buildings.
- In Outlawed, a 2021 alternate history novel by Anna North, a band of barren women come together to form the Hole in the Wall Gang, led by The Kid, determined to create a safe haven in a world where barren women are hanged as witches.
- In Age of Empires III: Definitive Edition, the Hole in the Wall Gang are the main antagonists of the second mission in the "Shadow" (Lakota) campaign. In the mission, they operate more like an army than an outlaw gang, attacking not only with outlaw units but also hussars and dragoons.
