= Josie Bassett =

American rancher (1874–1964)

- Born: Josephine Bassett; January 17, 1874; Hot Springs, Arkansas, US
- Died: May 1, 1964 (aged 90); Jensen, Utah, US
- Resting place: Bassett Cemetery; 40°47′29.04″N 108°50′44.88″W
- Other name: Josie Bassett Morris
- Occupations: Western Rancher; Cattle Rustler; Bootlegger
- Known for: Association with outlaws such as Butch Cassidy's Wild Bunch; Romantically involved with Elzy Lay and Will "News" Carver; Claimed Butch Cassidy visited in 1930 and lived in Utah until the late 1940s
- Spouses: Jim McKnight; Carl McKnight; Emerson Wells; M.B. "Ben" Morris
- Children: 2
- Relatives: Ann Bassett (sister)

Josie Bassett (January 17, 1874 – May 1, 1964) was a rancher. She and her sister "Queen" Ann Bassett are known for their love affairs and associations with well-known outlaws, particularly Butch Cassidy's "Wild Bunch".

== Early life ==
Josie Bassett was born the first of two girls to Herb Bassett and Mary Eliza Chamberlain (Elizabeth) Bassett in Arkansas on January 17, 1874. When she was still a young girl, her parents moved to a ranch spanning the borders of Utah, Wyoming and Colorado. She and her sister were taught to rope, ride, and shoot at a young age. Both girls were sent to prominent boarding schools in their youth, but both chose to return to the ranching life by their teen years.

Herb Bassett was well known to many of the famous outlaws of the day as he did business with them often, supplying them with beef and fresh horses. Among those who visited the Bassett ranch were "Black Jack" Ketchum, Butch Cassidy, Elzy Lay, Kid Curry, Will "News" Carver and Ben Kilpatrick. With these notable outlaws coming often to the ranch, both Ann and Josie were first exposed to outlaws.

== Association with outlaws ==
Josie and Ann were good looking young women, and both had a wild side. By 1893, Ann Bassett was involved romantically with Butch Cassidy, and Josie was involved with Elzy Lay, Cassidy's closest friend. When Cassidy was sent to prison for 18 months, starting in 1894, Ann became involved in a relationship with Ben Kilpatrick. By the time Cassidy was released, Will "News" Carver had become involved with Josie, who ended their relationship when Carver became involved with female outlaw Laura Bullion. Josie in turn became involved with Cassidy until Cassidy again became involved with Ann.

That was the complicated circle of relationships that developed between the Bassett girls and Cassidy's Wild Bunch gang. Despite the seemingly constant changes in romantic companions by both the Bassett girls and the gang members, there is no indication that any animosity ever resulted from it.

Josie Bassett was reportedly one of only five women who were allowed into the outlaw hideout called "Robbers Roost", located in Utah; the others were her sister Ann, the Sundance Kid's girlfriend Etta Place, Elzy Lay's wife Maude Davis, and Will "News" Carver's girl Laura Bullion.

Those outlaw relationships, as well as the Bassett ranch's supply of beef and horses to the gang, assisted the sisters in their time of need. In 1896, several powerful and wealthy cattlemen approached the Bassetts to sell their ranch. When the sisters refused, the cattlemen's association began hiring cowboys to harass the sisters, stampeding their cattle and rustling. The sisters in turn began to rustle cattle from the cattlemen.

Although the cattlemen's association dispatched cowboys to harass the sisters and intimidate them into selling, the cowboys rarely followed through with the acts for fear of retribution from the outlaws with whom the sisters were known to associate. One legend indicates that Kid Curry, easily the most feared of the Wild Bunch gang, approached several of the cowboys known to work for the cattlemen and warned them to leave the Bassetts alone. That story cannot be confirmed, but what is certain is that by 1899, the sisters were receiving very little pressure to sell.

== After the outlaw days ==
As time passed, the Wild Bunch gang eventually faded. By 1904, most of the gang members closest to the Bassett girls had either been killed or captured. Josie's former lover, Wild Bunch gang member Elzy Lay, reportedly visited Ann and Josie at the ranch shortly after his release from prison in 1906 before he moved to California, where he lived the remainder of his life as a respectable businessman. Although Cassidy is reported to have been killed in Bolivia, Josie claimed that he visited her in 1930 and lived in Utah until the late 1940s.

Josie Bassett lived most of her life on her father's property, operating the ranch and leading a mostly outdoor life, with camping, fishing and hunting as her primary hobbies. She married five times over the course of her lifetime. She divorced four of her husbands, allegedly running one off with a frying pan. With one husband, James McKnight, Bassett had two sons: Crawford McKnight and Herbert "Chick" McKnight.

In 1913, she moved to a homestead near Vernal, Utah, and made a new ranch there her lifetime commitment. In 1924, Crawford helped her build a new cabin on this property.

During the Great Depression, she supplied food to others in the area, particularly with supplies of beef. She made her own soap, sewed her own clothing, and became known for her prowess at hunting deer, which she often did for her own family and for neighbors. In one instance, a game warden stopped by her cabin announcing that he was there to arrest her for poaching. She confessed that she had just killed a deer and took him to the carcass. The game warden was joking with her and took no action.

During the Prohibition years, Josie made and sold bootlegged whiskey but she never was arrested. Years after Prohibition, she continued to make her own brandy and whiskey until she was finally warned that revenue agents were looking for her still.

In 1936, rancher and former adversary Jim Robinson accused her of butchering his cattle and selling the meat in town. Six other ranchers joined in on the accusations. Hides from the carcasses were found on her property. Bassett was arrested. She claimed the evidence was planted. Several neighbors supplied her with bail money until her trial. She was tried twice, each ending in a hung jury. After the second trial, the local prosecutor dropped the charges.

In 1945, she fell victim to a land scheme and lost most of her land. However, she lived frugally in her cabin and supported herself well into her 80s. In later life, she became an eccentric and talked often with neighbors about the wild days and her associations with outlaws.

In December 1963, she fell when a horse knocked her down, breaking her hip. She died a few months later at the age of 90. She was the last remaining associate of the Wild Bunch gang as well as the last direct source of information about its members, their personalities, and traits.

== See also ==
- Josie Bassett Morris Ranch Complex
