= Tom Ketchum =

American outlaw (1863–1901)

Black Jack
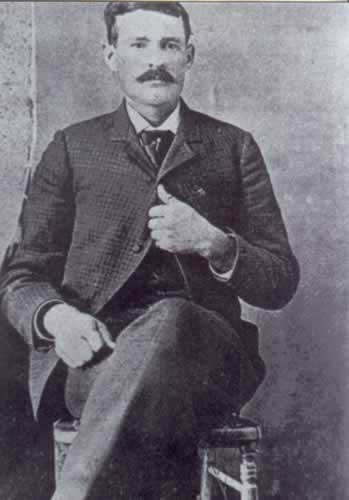
- Born: Thomas Edward Ketchum; October 31, 1863; San Saba County, Texas, Confederate States of America
- Died: April 26, 1901 (aged 37); Union County, Territory of New Mexico, U.S.
- Cause of death: Decapitation due to botched execution by hanging
- Occupations: Cowboy, outlaw
- Status: Executed
- Conviction: Attempted train robbery
- Penalty: Death

Thomas Edward Ketchum (known as Black Jack; October 31, 1863 – April 26, 1901) was an American cowboy who later became an outlaw. He was executed in 1901 for attempted train robbery. The execution by hanging was botched; he was decapitated because the executioner used a rope that was too long.

== First train robberies and murders ==
Tom Ketchum was born in San Saba County, Texas. He left Texas in 1890, possibly after committing a crime. He worked as a cowboy in the Pecos River Valley of New Mexico, where by 1894, his older brother, Sam Ketchum, had joined him. Black Jack and a group of others were named as the robbers of an Atchison, Topeka and Santa Fe Railway train that was en route to Deming, New Mexico Territory, in 1892 with a large payroll aboard.

The gang reportedly robbed the train just outside Nutt, New Mexico Territory, a water station twenty miles (32 km) north of Deming. Black Jack and his gang often visited the ranch of Herb Bassett, near Brown's Park, Colorado, who was known to have done business with several outlaws of the day, having supplied them with beef and fresh horses. Herb Bassett was the father of female outlaws Josie Bassett and Ann Bassett, who were girlfriends of several members of Butch Cassidy's Wild Bunch gang. One of Ann Bassett's boyfriends and future Wild Bunch gang member, Ben Kilpatrick, began riding with Black Jack's gang about that time. Outlaw "Bronco Bill" Walters, later noted for the legend of his "hidden loot" near Solomonville, Arizona, is also believed to have begun riding with the gang at this time.

The second major crime attributed to Ketchum was the murder of a neighbor, John N. "Jap" Powers, in Tom Green County, Texas, on December 12, 1895. However, information at the Sutton Historical Society in Texas says that Will Carver and Sam Ketchum were the ones actually accused of killing Powers in Knickerbocker. Fearing arrest, they closed their joint saloon and gambling venture in San Angelo and became fugitives. Within six months, Mrs. Powers and her lover, J. E. Wright, were arrested for the murder, by which time Carver and the Ketchums had already become outlaws.

By late 1895, outlaw Harvey "Kid Curry" Logan and his brother Lonnie Curry were members of Black Jack's gang. However, in early 1896, a dispute concerning their share of robbery loot prompted the Currys to leave the gang.

It is alleged that Ketchum was involved with the February 1, 1896, disappearance and presumed murders of Albert Jennings Fountain and his son Henry Fountain of Las Cruces, New Mexico. In early June 1896, after working for the Bell Ranch in New Mexico, Tom and Sam Ketchum, and possibly others, robbed a combined store and post office at Liberty, New Mexico, northwest of present-day Tucumcari. According to contemporary accounts, the Ketchums rode into Liberty on June 12 and purchased supplies. That evening, a thunderstorm began, and they returned to the store, owned by Morris and Levi Herzstein, who invited them to take shelter.

Returning the next morning to open his store, Levi Herzstein found that both the store and post office had been burglarized. After gathering a posse, Herzstein set out on the outlaws' trail. The posse, composed of four men, took the two outlaws by surprise in the Plaza Largo arroyo, where a shootout immediately began. Levi Herzstein and Hermenejildo Gallegos were killed within seconds. Seeing his comrades fall, Anastacio Borgue turned his horse and rode out of the arroyo. Placido Gurulé, the fourth member of the posse, also survived to give an account. Gurulé said he had been struck by a .30-30 bullet that knocked him off his horse. He landed on the ground with a blow that knocked the wind out of him. He lay in a semiconscious state as Black Jack Ketchum emptied his rifle into the bodies of Levi Herzstein and Hermenejildo Gallegos. Tom and Sam Ketchum were never tried for the killings at the Plaza Largo arroyo, but Morris Herzstein reportedly was present to witness the hanging of Black Jack Ketchum in 1901.

Morris Herzstein moved to Clayton shortly after the killing in Liberty, and later to the Texas Panhandle area. He was the father of Albert Herzstein, who became one of the founders of Big 3 Industries in Houston and later helped establish the museum in Clayton.

== Joining the Hole-In-The-Wall gang ==
Following this event, Thomas Ketchum joined other outlaws of the Hole in the Wall Gang and continued a life of crime, focusing on train robberies, although when not robbing trains they worked for several ranches in New Mexico and Texas. Several other notable outlaws operated out of Hole In The Wall, which was a hideout for numerous outlaw gangs which operated separately. The Wild Bunch gang, led by Butch Cassidy and Elzy Lay, operated out of there. One Wild Bunch gang member, Kid Curry, along with his brother Lonny Curry, had previously ridden with Black Jack Ketchum and his gang. He and Ketchum did not like each other, and Ketchum avoided Curry as much as possible. Kid Curry killed nine lawmen over the following eight years.

During this time, Tom Ketchum was once identified mistakenly as "Black Jack" Christian, another outlaw, and that became his nickname as well. Three of the train robberies that the gang committed were near the same location, between Folsom and Des Moines, New Mexico Territory. This was at the point where the old Fort Union wagon road crossed the Colorado and Southern Rail Road tracks near Twin Mountain.

On September 3, 1897, they committed their first robbery at Twin Mountain. Then, on July 11, 1899, the gang, without Black Jack, robbed the train again at Twin Mountain. After the robbery, Sam and several unknown gang members, in addition to Wild Bunch gang members Will Carver and William Ellsworth "Elzy" Lay, headed for the mountains southwest of Raton, New Mexico Territory. The next day, a posse consisting of Sheriff Ed Farr of Huerfano County, Colorado, Special Agent W.H. Reno of the Colorado & Southern Railroad, and five deputies found their trail and tracked them into Turkey Creek Canyon near Cimarron, New Mexico. There, the posse engaged them in a gun battle. Sam Ketchum and two deputies were wounded seriously, and the gang escaped.

Sam Ketchum's wounds slowed the intended escape, and they made it only a short distance from the initial shootout. Several members of the posse cornered the Ketchum gang a few days later, still in the same area of the Territory. Deputy W. H. Love and Sheriff Ed Farr engaged the outlaws in another gun battle, resulting in both Love and Farr being killed, while the posse wounded at least two unknown members of the gang. Sam Ketchum escaped, but was found a few days later by Special Agent Reno at the home of a rancher, where he was arrested.

Sam Ketchum was taken to the Santa Fe Territorial Prison, where he died from his gunshot wounds. He was buried in the Odd Fellows rest Cemetery, now the Fairview Cemetery on Cerrillos Rd. in Santa Fe.

"Elzy" or "Elza" (William Ellsworth) Lay was born November 25, 1868, in Mount Pleasant, Ohio. Lay had come out west to Denver, and became an outlaw after mistakenly believing he had killed a man. Jailed for life after the killing of Sheriff Farr after the Folsom robbery, he was released in 1906. He returned to Alma, New Mexico Territory and lived there for two years. He stayed with Louis and Walter Jones, who in 1904 had built a large merchandise store at Alma. Lay died aged 65 in Los Angeles, on November 10, 1934.

== Capture and execution ==
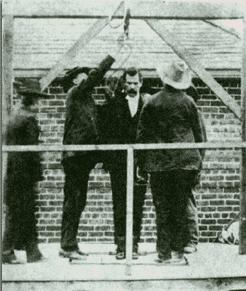
Ketchum on the scaffold before hanging, April 26, 1901, Clayton, New Mexico

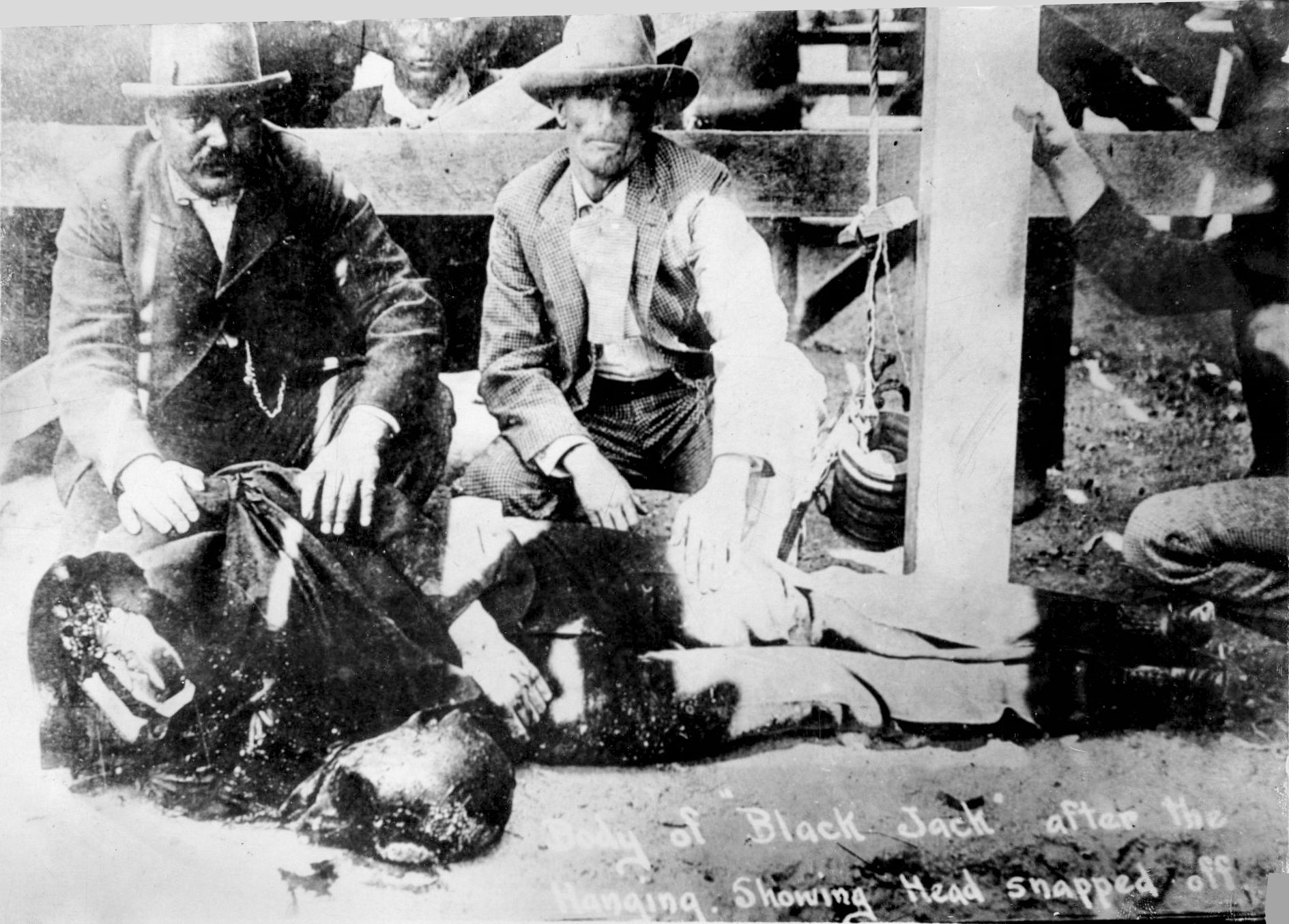
Photo from a contemporary postcard showing Tom Ketchum's decapitated body. Caption reads "Body of Black Jack after the hanging showing head snapped off."

On August 16, 1899, Tom Ketchum, reportedly knowing nothing of the July 11 hold-up which ended in the death of his brother Sam, single-handedly attempted to rob the same train again at the same place and in the same way that he and Sam and others had robbed it just a few weeks earlier. The train conductor, Frank Harrington, saw Ketchum approaching the moving train, recognized him, then grabbed a shotgun and shot Ketchum in the arm, knocking him off his horse. The train continued, and the next day a posse came out and found Ketchum beside the tracks, badly wounded. He was transported to medical facilities at Trinidad, Colorado, and his right arm had to be amputated. He was nursed back to health and then sent to Clayton, New Mexico Territory, for trial.

At the trial, Ketchum was convicted of attempted train robbery and sentenced to death. He was the only person ever hanged in Union County, New Mexico Territory (now Union County, New Mexico). He was also the only person who suffered capital punishment for the offense of "felonious assault upon a railway train" in New Mexico Territory (which did not become a state until 1912). Later, the law was found to be unconstitutional.

Ketchum was executed by hanging in Clayton on April 26, 1901, but no one in the town had any experience with the procedure. The combination of too long a rope, Ketchum's significant weight gain while in jail, and the mass imbalance due to the amputation of his arm caused him to be decapitated when he fell through the trapdoor. Ketchum's last words were "Good-bye. Please dig my grave very deep. All right; hurry up."

An account of the event from Sheriff Salome Garcia detailed the scene:

He walked firmly up the steps, saying as he went up, "Dig my grave deep, boys." Stepping upon the trap door he asked for the black cap, and it was placed over his head but [it] had to be removed to permit the rope to be placed on his neck, and while they delayed somewhat he became impatient and said, "Let her go boys." ... The sheriff cut the trigger rope with a hatchet, and his body shot down with all its 215 pounds [98 kg] of weight. Everyone within or without the stockade held their breath, and their hearts gave a great bound of horror when it was seen that his head had been severed from his body by the fall. His body alighted squarely upon its feet, stood for a moment, swayed and fell and then great streams of red, red blood spurted from his severed neck, as if to shame the very ground upon which it poured. The head rolled aside and the rope, released, bounded high and fell with a thud upon the scaffold from whence it came.

A popular postcard was made showing the body. Afterwards his head was sewn back onto the body for viewing, and he was interred at the Clayton Cemetery.

== Media portrayals ==
Western actor Jack Elam portrayed Ketchum in an episode of the 1954–55 syndicated television series Stories of the Century.

Howard Duff played Ketchum in the 1957 American Western film Blackjack Ketchum, Desperado.

Rhodes Reason played Ketchum in a 1959 episode of the American Western television series Frontier Doctor.

Martin Kove played Ketchum in the 1994 television film The Gambler V: Playing for Keeps.

== See also ==
- List of people executed in the United States in 1901
- List of botched executions
