= Laura Bullion =

American outlaw (1876–1961)

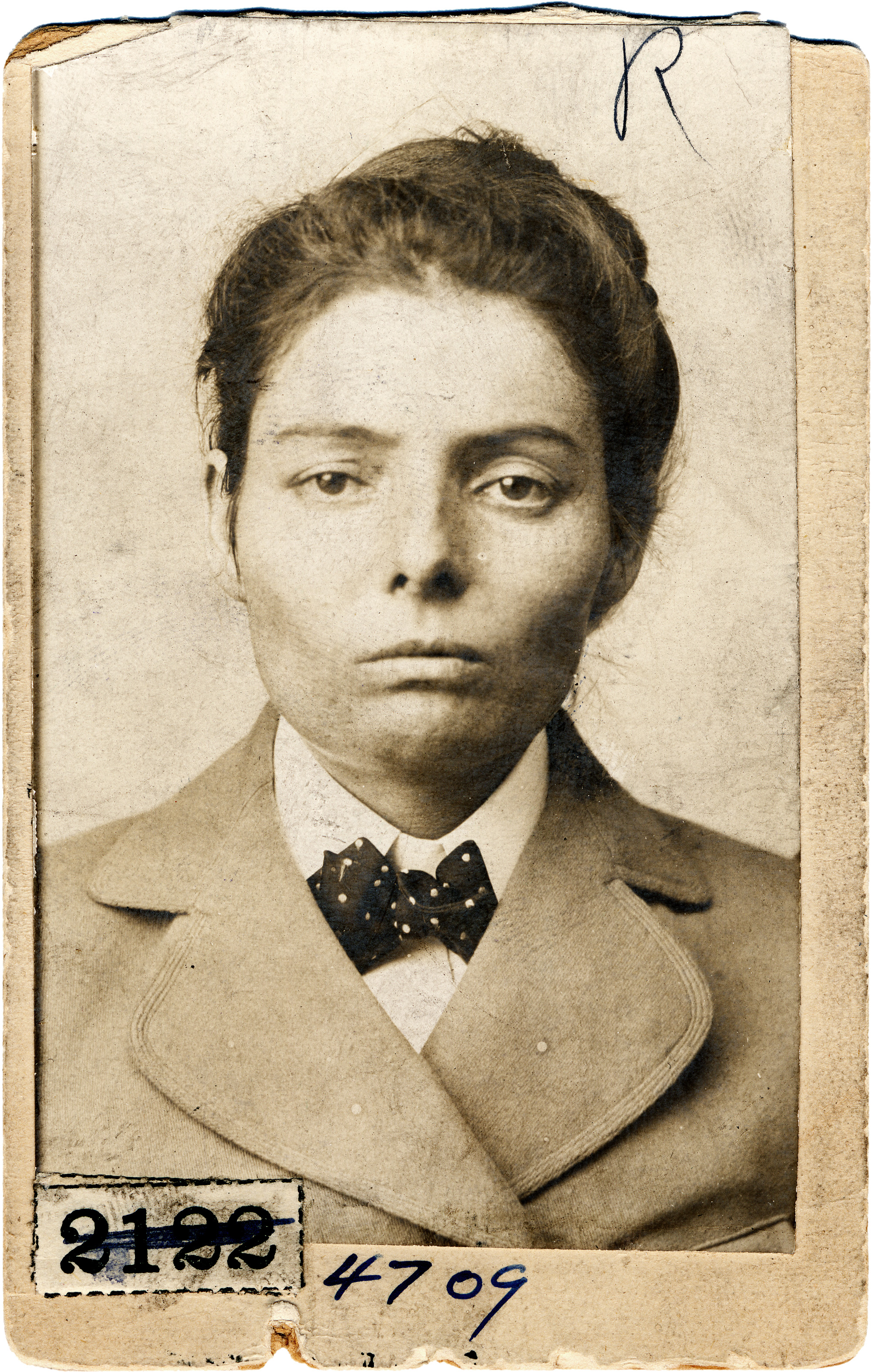
- Laura Bullion mugshot (early November, 1901. St. Louis, Missouri)
- Born: October 1876; Knickerbocker near Mertzon, Texas
- Died: December 2, 1961 (aged 85); Memphis, Tennessee
- Occupations: Criminal and prostitute. Later householder and seamstress
- Parent(s): Henry Bullion and Fredy Byler
- Status: Arrested November 6, 1901. Released from prison in September 1905
- Criminal charges: Robbery and forgery of signatures to banknotes

Laura Bullion (October 1876 – December 2, 1961) was an outlaw of the Old West. Most sources indicate Bullion was born in Knickerbocker, near Mertzon, in Irion County, Texas; the exact day of her birth is unclear. Data in the 1880 and 1900 federal census suggest a Laura Bullion might have been born on a farm in the township of Palarm near Conway in Faulkner County, Arkansas, and might have grown up in Tom Green County, Texas. Other sources claim Laura Bullion was born in Kentucky in 1873.

In the 1890s, Laura Bullion was a member of Butch Cassidy's Wild Bunch gang; her cohorts were fellow outlaws, including the Sundance Kid, "Black Jack" Ketchum, and Kid Curry. For several years in the 1890s, she was romantically involved with outlaw Ben Kilpatrick ("The Tall Texan"), a bank and train robber and an acquaintance of her father, who had been an outlaw as well.

Bullion was arrested in early November 1901 in St. Louis, Missouri. She was convicted of robbery and sentenced to five years in prison for her role in the Great Northern train robbery. She was released from the Missouri State Penitentiary at Jefferson City, Missouri, on September 19, 1905, after serving three years and 10 months of her punishment.

Laura Bullion moved to Memphis, Tennessee, in 1918, posing as a war widow and using assumed names. She supported herself as a householder and seamstress, and later as a drapery maker, dressmaker, and interior designer. Her fortunes declined in the late 1940s, when she was without an occupation. In 1961, she died of heart disease at the Shelby County Hospital in Memphis. Her final resting place is at the Memorial Park Cemetery in Memphis.

== Early life ==
Laura Bullion (1890s)

Most sources report Laura Bullion was born in Knickerbocker, Texas, near Mertzon, in Irion County in or around October 1876. Although the actual date of her birth is unknown, Bullion's death record indicates October 4 as her birthday. Bullion's death certificate lists Henry Bullion as her father and Freda Byler as her mother.

Bullion's father had been an outlaw and was acquainted with outlaws William "News" Carver and Ben Kilpatrick ("The Tall Texan"), both of whom Bullion met when she was around 13 years of age. Her aunt, Viana Byler, married Carver in 1891, but she died soon after the marriage from fever. At age 15, Bullion began a romance with Carver, who for a time after his wife's death had been involved with female outlaw Josie Bassett, sister to Cassidy's girlfriend Ann Bassett.

=== Birthday ambiguity ===
Most sources, as well as Bullion's grave marker, provide 1876 as the year of her birth; 1873 is also mentioned as a possible year of her birth. The exact day is not known.

In an arrest report dated November 6, 1901, her age is mentioned as 28 at the time of the arrest. Provided the birth year of 1876 is correct, Bullion would have been 24 or 25 years of age at this time.

The death certificate states Bullion's age at death as 74, and her date of birth as October 4, 1887. Provided the birth year of 1876 is correct, Bullion would have been 84 or 85 years of age at her death. The certificate is issued under the name Freda Bullion Lincoln, a false identity she assumed when she moved to Memphis, claiming to be the war widow of Maurice Lincoln and making herself about 10 years younger than she was.

=== Birthplace ambiguity ===
Most sources, including Laura Bullion's death certificate, give Texas as her state of birth.

Data found in the 1880 and 1900 census suggests Bullion might have been born on a farm in the Palarm Township near Conway in Faulkner County, Arkansas. The 1880 Federal Census of Population for Palarm Township shows the family of a Kentucky-born farmer named Henry Bullion, aged 42, living with his wife Martha, 40 years old, and four children, including a son Lewis, 4 years of age.

The 1900 census documents a 23-year-old Laura Bullion, born October 1876 in Arkansas, who stated her occupation as "housekeeper" and who was living with her grandparents E.R. and Serena Byler, her aunt Mrs. Mary Allen, and her three children at the Byler homestead in the southwest portion of the Commissioner's Precinct Number 4 in Tom Green County, Texas. Tom Green County borders Irion County, Bullion's assumed county of birth, in the north and east.

Other material claims Laura Bullion probably was born in Kentucky in 1873 and was raised in Texas.

== Outlaw life ==
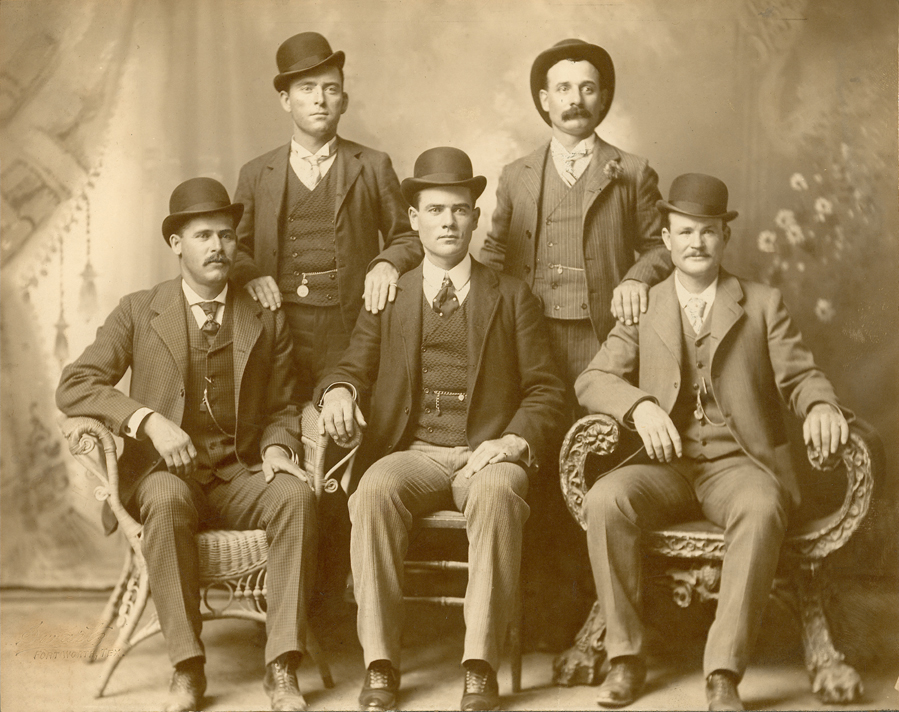
The Wild Bunch in Fort Worth, Texas (1900). Use cursor to identify persons.

When Bullion first became involved with Carver, the latter was riding with the Tom "Black Jack" Ketchum gang, and Bullion wanted to join him. However, he would not allow it at first, and they only saw one another between robberies. While in Utah and on the run from lawmen, Carver became involved with the Wild Bunch gang, led by Butch Cassidy and Elzy Lay.

=== Aliases and disguises ===
Members of the Wild Bunch nicknamed Laura Bullion "Della Rose", a name she came by after meeting Kid Curry's girlfriend Della Moore. Often, Bullion also was referred to as the "Rose of the Wild Bunch". When her boyfriend Ben Kilpatrick and she fled east to evade the law after a train robbery in 1901, the couple traveled under the names "Mr. and Mrs. Benjamin Arnold".

In an arrest report following the train robbery, dated November 6, 1901, Bullion's name is filed as "Della Rose" and her aliases are stated to be "Clara Hays" and "Laura Casey and [Laura] Bullion". The arrest report lists her profession as prostitute. According to a New York Times article, she was "masquerading as 'Mrs. Nellie Rose' at the time of her arrest. The same article also mentions the suspicion that she, "disguised as a boy", might have taken part in a train robbery in Montana. The paper cites Chief of Detectives Desmond: "I would'nt [sic] think helping to hold up a train was too much for her. She is cool, shows absolutely no fear, and in male attire would readily pass for a boy. She has a masculine face, and that would give her assurance in her disguise." Instead of "Clara Hays", Bullion also used "Clare Hayes" or "Clara Hayes" as a version of her alias. Other assumed names she used at that time were "Desert Rose", "Wild Bunch Rose", and "Clara Casey".

When Bullion turned up in Memphis in 1918, she used the names "Freda Lincoln", "Freda Bullion Lincoln", and "Mrs. Maurice Lincoln", claiming to be a war widow and her late husband had been Maurice Lincoln. She also made herself 10 years younger, claiming to have been born in 1887. On her grave marker at the Memorial Park Cemetery in Memphis, Bullion's name is inscribed as "Freda Bullion Lincoln" and "Laura Bullion", her birth name. The epitaph "The Thorny Rose" refers to her nickname in the Wild Bunch.

=== Relationships ===
Ben Kilpatrick (1900)

In the early 1890s, Bullion became involved romantically with Ben Kilpatrick after Carver began a relationship with a prostitute named Lillie Davis, whom he had met at Fannie Porter's brothel in San Antonio. As the gang robbed trains, Bullion supported them by selling stolen goods and making connections that could give the gang steady supplies and horses.

By 1901, Bullion again was involved romantically with Carver and had occasional involvement with other members of the gang. When Carver was killed by lawmen on April 1, 1901, Bullion became involved romantically with Kilpatrick again, and the two fled to Knoxville, Tennessee. Della Moore and Kid Curry met with them there, and the four stayed together for a number of months, until October, when Della Moore was arrested for passing money linked to one of the gang's robberies.

=== Arrest ===
On about November 1, 1901, Ben Kilpatrick and Laura Bullion arrived in St. Louis by train, and checked into the Laclede Hotel using the aliases Mr. & Mrs. J.W. Rose. At 11:50 pm on Nov.5 (Tuesday ), Ben Kilpatrick was arrested at Josie Blakey's resort at 2005 Chestnut St. In his pocket, the authorities found a key to a room at the Laclede Hotel. On the morning of November 6, they entered the hotel lobby, where Laura Bullion was in the process of checking out with her luggage. In her valise, they discovered $8500 in unsigned banknotes taken in the Great Northern train robbery. Laura was arrested at 9:15 am on federal charges for "forgery of signatures to banknotes."

Curry escaped capture on December 13, 1901, killing two Knoxville policemen in the process. Both Bullion and Kilpatrick were convicted of robbery, with Bullion being sentenced to five years in prison and Kilpatrick receiving a 20-year sentence. She served three and a half years before being released in 1905. Kilpatrick was not released from prison until 1911.

== After the outlaw life ==
Kilpatrick stayed in contact with Bullion through letters. By the time of his release from prison in 1911, she had become involved with at least four other men, but she and Kilpatrick never reconnected nor did they see one another again. Kilpatrick was killed robbing a train on March 13, 1912. By this time, the Wild Bunch gang had disbanded.

=== Memphis years ===
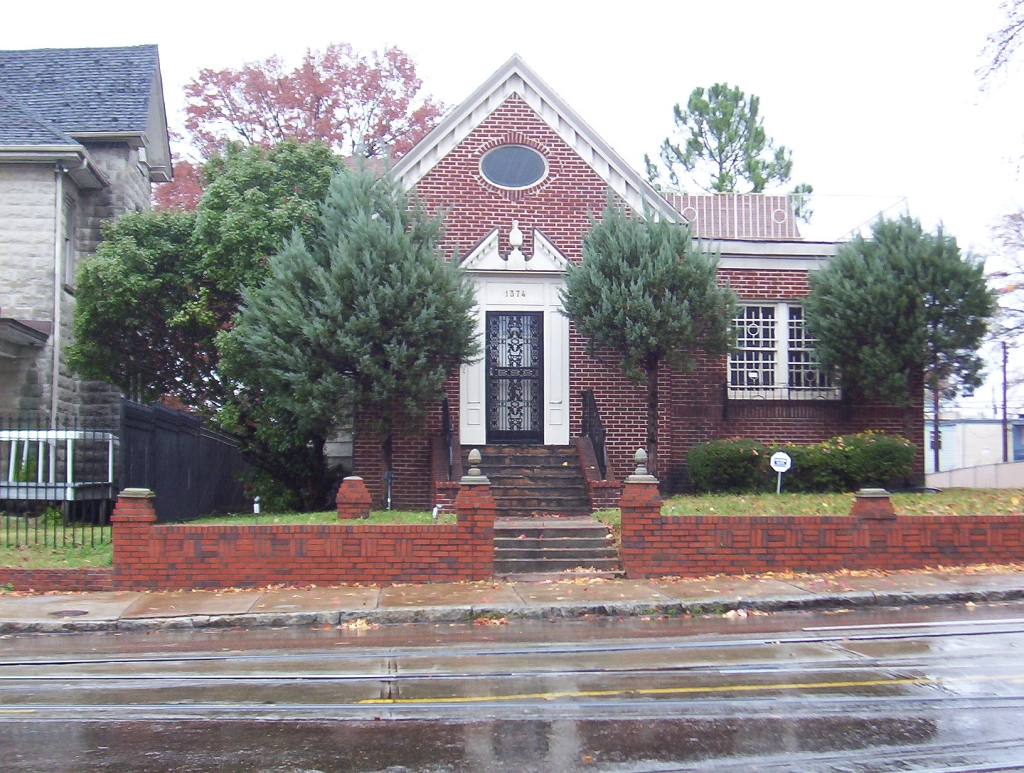
Laura Bullion's residence in Memphis from 1927 to 1948 (2007)

In 1918, Bullion moved to Memphis, where she spent the remainder of her life working as a householder and seamstress, and later as a drapery maker, dressmaker, and interior designer.

In 1920, the Memphis City Directory lists Bullion as seamstress for the Jennings Furniture Co., with rooms at 221 Monroe Ave. From 1927 to 1948, she is listed as "householder" at 1374 Madison Ave. This is the only one of the buildings still in existence in 2007. In the 1930s, Bullion was listed as "drapery maker". Her occupation was upgraded to "interior decorator" in 1940. Her fortunes declined in the late 1940s. In 1950, Bullion moved to 1065 Walker Ave, with no profession listed. The following year, she moved to 3691 Southern Ave and in 1952 to 733 Decatur St. From 1953 to 1959, Bullion disappeared from the telephone book and is not listed in the city directory.

In 1959, Bullion was listed as living at 278 Cossitt Place. She lived there until her death two years later.

=== Death ===
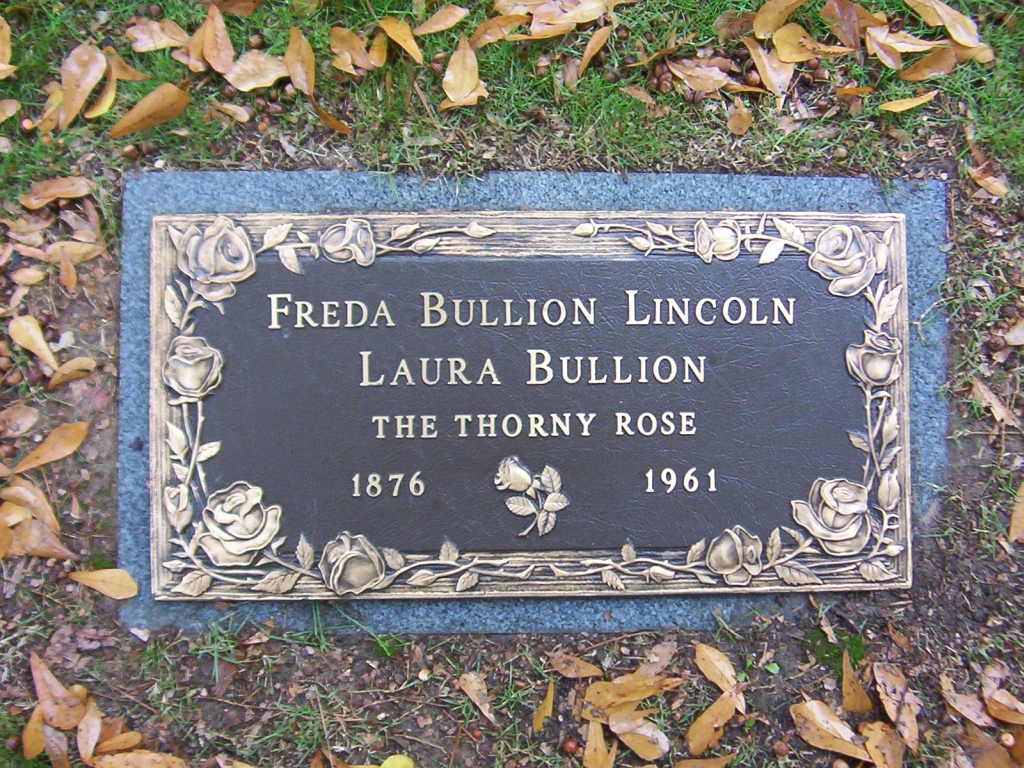
Grave marker at the Memorial Park Cemetery, Memphis (2007)

According to her obituary, Bullion died of heart disease at the Shelby County Hospital at 6:45 pm on December 2, 1961. The memorial service was held at 11:30 am on December 4. She is buried in the Memorial Park Cemetery. Bullion was the last surviving member of the Wild Bunch gang.

Her grave marker reads:

Freda Bullion Lincoln
Laura Bullion
The Thorny Rose
1876 - 1961

Bullion's bronze grave marker has a decoration of embossed rose vines along the edges. The decoration and her epitaph "The Thorny Rose" refer to Bullion's nickname in the Wild Bunch.

== Her cohorts' fate ==
For a number of years before her death, Bullion was one of only three people who had known the mysterious Etta Place, girlfriend to Wild Bunch gang member, the Sundance Kid. Place simply disappeared in 1909, following the Kid's alleged death in Bolivia. Only Bullion, Ann Bassett, and Josie Bassett could have shed light on the facts about Etta Place. Ann Bassett died in 1956. In 1964, Josie Bassett died.

== Notes ==
References to the Shelby County Register of Deeds reflect information from the death certificate of Freda Bullion Lincoln, the identity Laura Bullion assumed for 43 years, when she was living in Memphis. Some of the information does not match the real facts, which is not unusual for a false identity. She registered under a false name, made herself 10 years younger, and claimed to be the widow of Maurice Lincoln. The state of her birth is given correctly as Texas. How truthful the information about her parents' names is or about the day of her birth is unclear. The information is not provided to start speculation; it is the data on the record about the assumed identity of Laura Bullion at the time of her death. It is an 'accurate' and 'truthful' reflection of vital records containing potentially 'inaccurate' or 'untruthful' data as provided to the authorities by Laura Bullion herself.
