= Robbers Roost =

Robbers Roost, Utah
- Hideout
- Interactive map of Robbers Roost, Utah
- Coordinates: 38°19′14″N 110°32′08″W

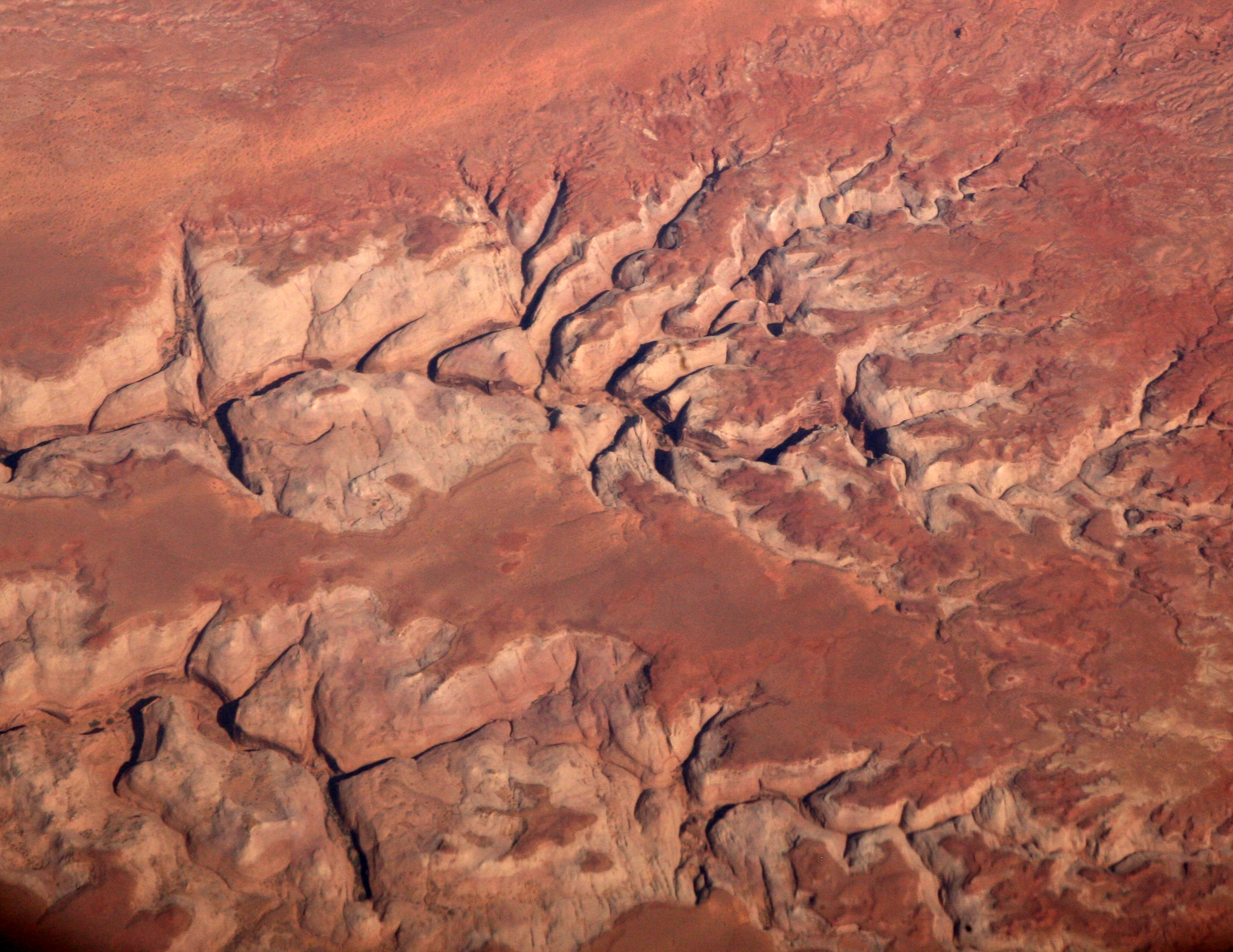
Upper Robbers Roost Canyon, aerial photo.

The Robbers Roost was an outlaw hideout in southeastern Utah used mostly by Butch Cassidy and his Wild Bunch gang in the closing years of the Old West.

The hideout was considered ideal because of the rough terrain. It was easily defended, difficult to navigate into without detection, and excellent when the gang needed a month or longer to rest and lie low following a robbery. While hiding out at Robbers Roost, Elzy Lay and Butch Cassidy first formed the Wild Bunch gang. The Wild Bunch, early on led by Cassidy and his closest friend Elzy Lay, developed contacts inside Utah that gave them easy access to supplies of fresh horses and beef, most notably the ranch owned by outlaw sisters Ann and Josie Bassett. The gang constructed cabins inside Robbers Roost to help shield them from the harsh winters. There, they stored weapons, horses, chickens, and cattle.

Pursuing lawmen of the day never discovered the site of the hideout. The outlaws held each other to strict confidentiality regarding its location. Only five women are known to have ever been allowed inside Robbers Roost: Ann and Josie Bassett, the Sundance Kid's girlfriend Etta Place, one of Elzy Lay's girlfriends Maude Davis, and gang member Laura Bullion.

Charlie Siringo wrote that Robbers' Roost was "fifty miles east of Hanksville, where the 'Wild Bunch' used twenty-dollar gold pieces for poker chips." He goes on to write the Wild Bunch used Robbers' Roost as "headquarters for several years until Joe Bush and a posse of Salt Lake City officers made a raid on the 'Roost' and killed some of the gang."

Robbers Roost Canyon, a remote tributary of the Dirty Devil River, is named after this hideout.

Today, Robbers Roost attracts hikers, backpackers, horseback riders, and all-terrain vehicle enthusiasts. Many steep, narrow slot canyons popular with technical canyoneers are found in Robbers Roost.

== Popular culture ==
In The Outlaw Trail: A Journey Through Time, Robert Redford devoted a chapter to Robbers Roost.

Robbers' Roost is also the title of a novel by Zane Grey set near the Dirty Devil River.

One of the canyons in the video game Red Dead Redemption 2 bears a resemblance to the area, and is part of a sequence wherein the player fights a number of outlaws camped out in the canyon.

== See also ==
- Hole-in-the-Wall (Wyoming)
