= Elizabeth Bassett =

Elizabeth Bassett may refer to:

- Elizabeth Bassett (maid-of-honour) (c. 1522–?), sister of Henry VIII's mistress, Anne Bassett, questioned for treason
- Elizabeth Bassett (cattle rustler) (c. 1858–1892), cattle rustler in Browns Park, Colorado
- Lady Elizabeth Basset (1908–2000), lady-in-waiting to Queen Elizabeth, the Queen Mother
