= George Curry (outlaw) =

American outlaw (1871–1900)

George "Flat-Nose" Curry
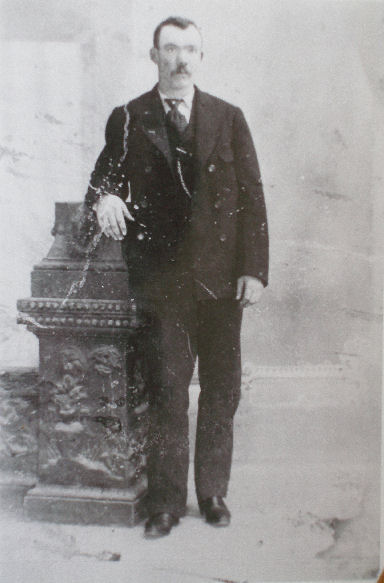
- Flat Nose Curry in the 1890s
- Born: George Sutherland Currie; March 20, 1871; West Point, Prince Edward Island, Canada
- Died: April 17, 1900 (aged 29); Grand County, Utah, U.S.
- Cause of death: Gunshot wound
- Other names: George "Flatnose" Curry; George Langthorpe
- Occupation: Outlaw
- Allegiance: Wild Bunch
- Criminal charges: Bank robbery, rustling

George Sutherland Currie (also known as George Curry, known as "Flat-Nose"; March 20, 1871 – April 17, 1900) was a Canadian-American robber of the American Old West. Curry was a mentor to Harvey Logan, who would adopt the surname Curry, and the two robbed banks together before both became members of Butch Cassidy's Wild Bunch. Curry was killed by a sheriff while rustling in Grand County, Utah.

== Early outlaw career ==
Curry was born in West Point, Prince Edward Island, in 1871, the second of six children of John and Nancy Ann (Macdonald) Currie. His family moved to Chadron, Nebraska, where he started rustling as a young man. He gained the nick-name "Flat-Nose" and took up residence at the outlaw hideout Hole-in-the-Wall. While there, he met Harvey Logan, who adopted his surname and became known as Kid Curry. The Kid's brothers Lonny and Johnnie Logan, following his example, also adopted Curry as a surname. Kid Curry would go on to become one of the most dangerous and feared gunmen of the Old West.

George Curry formed a gang that included Kid Curry, and was captured with him on June 28, 1897. The gang had held up the Butte County Bank at Belle Fourche, South Dakota, earlier in the month. All but one of them (Tom O'Day, whose horse had run away without him) had escaped with the money, but while planning another robbery a posse caught them in Fergus County, Montana, and captured George Curry, along with the Kid and Walt Putney. They escaped from Deadwood jail in November by overpowering the jailer.

The three men stole horses and made their way back to Montana, stealing supplies as they went. Another posse caught up with them in the Bearpaw mountains. There was a gunfight from which the fugitives escaped on foot, leaving the stolen goods and horses behind. They retreated to the Hole-in-the-Wall, robbing two post offices on their route.

== Wild Bunch ==
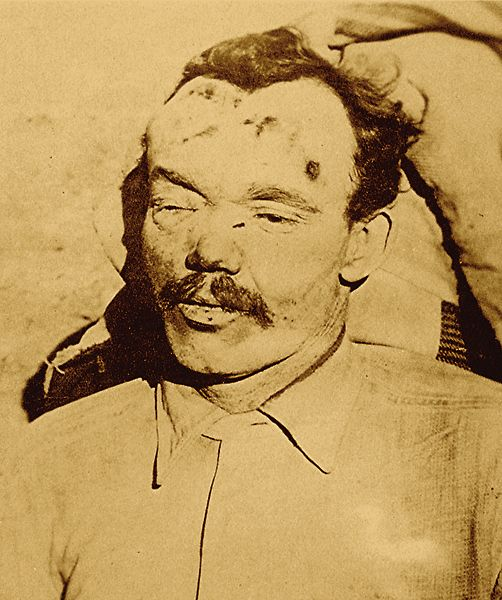
Flat Nose Curry after his shooting by the sheriff Jesse Tyler

At the Hole they were involved in a gun battle with another posse, but the rough terrain, and the defensive structures built and manned by the several dozen outlaw members of the Wild Bunch hiding there, were too much for the lawmen.

Curry participated in the Wild Bunch raid on the Union Pacific Overland Flyer train at Wilcox, Wyoming on June 2, 1899, which became famous, as well as taking part in several other robberies. The Overland Flyer's train crew provided descriptions of the robbers, which local Converse County Sheriff Josiah Hazen recognized as Butch Cassidy, Kid Curry, Flat Nose George Curry, and Elzy Lay. Hazen formed a posse immediately but Kid Curry and George Curry shot and killed Hazen during his posse's pursuit of them, which slowed the posse. In the ensuing confusion the Wild Bunch were able to wade downstream and escape without their horses. The outlaws walked to a sheep ranch at Castle Creek, where they rested before continuing to the Tisdale mountains on the north fork of the Powder River. Here they were able to obtain replacement horses and resupply. (Local Deputy Sheriff William Deane came into contact with the gang there but was shot and killed by Kid Curry April 15, 1897.)

Although the posse greatly outnumbered them and could cover a lot of ground in its search, the Wild Bunch reached the safe stronghold of the Hole-in-the-Wall. Pinkerton agent Charlie Siringo and contracted Pinkerton agent Tom Horn developed information that identified Kid Curry as killing Hazen. There were never any definite accounts connecting Kid Curry to the killing of Deputy Deane, but rumors uncovered by Siringo while he worked undercover indicated that Kid Curry had been the killer.

The Currys and some of the other members of the Wild Bunch went to hide at Robbers Roost in Utah, after getting supplies at the ranch of female outlaws Josie and Ann Bassett.

George Curry was shot and killed on April 17, 1900, by Sheriff Jesse Tyler while Curry was rustling in Grand County, Utah. Upon hearing of this, Harvey "Kid Curry" Logan, who was also enraged by the recent law enforcement killing of his younger brother Lonny in Missouri, vowed to get revenge. In May, Kid Curry rode from New Mexico to Utah, and took revenge for his brother and George Curry's deaths by killing Sheriff Tyler and his Deputy Sheriff Sam Jenkins in a gunfight.

== Bibliography ==
- Nash, Jay Robert (1989). Encyclopedia of Western: Lawmen & Outlaws. New York: Rowman & Littlefield. p. 572. ISBN 9781590775301.
