= Elzy Lay =

American outlaw (1869–1934)

- Born: William Ellsworth Lay; November 25, 1869; Mount Pleasant, Vinton County, Ohio
- Died: November 10, 1934 (aged 65); Los Angeles, California
- Resting place: Forest Lawn Memorial Park
- Occupations: Cowboy; Outlaw
- Spouses: Matilda Maud Davis Atwood (1874-1958); Mary Calvert (1887-1964)
- Children: Marvel Matilda Lay Murdock (1897-1983); James Walter Lay (1910-1969); Mary Lucille Lay Morgan (1912-2009)
- Parents: James Landon Lay; Mary Jane Bellew
- Allegiance: Butch Cassidy's Wild Bunch; Hole-in-the-Wall Gang

William Ellsworth "Elzy" Lay (November 25, 1869 – November 10, 1934) was an outlaw of the Old West in the United States. He was a member of Butch Cassidy's Wild Bunch gang, operating out of the Hole-in-the-Wall Pass in Johnson County, Wyoming. Lay was Cassidy's best friend and assisted him in leading the Wild Bunch gang.

== Early life ==
Lay was born in Mount Pleasant, an unincorporated community in Vinton County, Ohio, the son of James Landon Lay and Mary Jane Bellew. He had a brother, Encil Lay, and a sister, Maggie Lay Sprigg. Shortly after his birth, the family moved to northeastern Colorado. At the age of 18, Lay left home looking for adventure with his childhood friend William McGinnis. McGinnis soon returned home, claiming he was homesick. Later, Lay used the name "McGinnis" as an alias when working as a ranch hand.

== Outlaw life ==
In the autumn of 1889, Lay met outlaw Butch Cassidy while in Utah. The two became close friends, and Lay began dating Josie Bassett, the daughter of a rancher who often sold beef and horses to the outlaws, while Cassidy began dating her sister, 15-year-old future western outlaw Ann Bassett. He worked briefly on the ranch of cattleman Matt Warner, and it was Warner who gave Lay his first tip for a robbery. From Warner, Lay learned that a shopkeeper nearby had a large sum of cash. Warner, his nephew Lew McCarty, and Lay robbed the man and split the money.

Lay then opened up a gambling house in Vernal, Utah. For a time, it was profitable, until it was shut down by Uintah County Sheriff John T. Pope. Following his business being closed, Lay moved back to Warner's ranch, where he renewed his relationship with Josie Bassett. He remained there until Butch Cassidy was released from an eighteen-month prison sentence. During that time, Lay became involved with another girl, Maude Davis, whose brother Albert Davis was a smalltime outlaw. Outlaw Ben Kilpatrick began dating Cassidy's girlfriend Ann Bassett during that time. Cassidy and Lay, after Cassidy's prison release, obtained their own cabin on the Green River. Ann Bassett ended her relationship with Kilpatrick, and returned to her involvement with Cassidy.

In August, 1896, Matt Warner killed two prospectors named Dick Staunton and Dave Milton, during a shootout near Vernal. Warner had been employed by E.B. Coleman to intimidate Staunton and Milton away from a mining claim. The intimidation turned into a gun battle. Warner, Coleman, and hired gunman Bill Wall were arrested, and eventually transported to Ogden, Utah, where they were held in jail. In a plea for help to Butch Cassidy, Warner said he needed a lawyer. Cassidy and Lay robbed a bank in Montpelier, Idaho, using the funds to secure an attorney for Warner. Warner and Wall were convicted of manslaughter, and received a five-year sentence, while Coleman was found not guilty.

== The Wild Bunch gang ==
Cassidy and Lay began hiding out at what was called "Robbers Roost", in Utah. Girlfriends Maude Davis and Ann Bassett joined them there, Lay having ended his relationship with Ann's sister, Josie, who by that time was involved in a relationship with Lay's outlaw friend Will "News" Carver. In April 1897, the two women were sent home, while Cassidy and Lay began planning the robbery of a payroll shipment in Castle Gate, Utah. In a 2006 History Channel documentary on the Old West, this robbery is described as Cassidy's boldest. On April 21, 1897, the payroll arrived, and Cassidy and his gang members simply walked out in broad daylight and took $7,000 at gunpoint. A gang member named Joe Walker is alleged to have disabled the telegraph lines to prevent word of the robbery being put out to nearby law enforcement.

By this time, Maude and Lay had married, and Maude was pregnant with his child. After the birth of their daughter, Marvel, Maude insisted he leave the outlaw life and settle down. He refused. Cassidy and Lay traveled to New Mexico, and by this time were calling their gang the "Wild Bunch". There, they worked for a short time on the "WS Ranch", before heading north to Wyoming. They committed their most famous robbery on June 2, 1899, by robbing a Union Pacific train near Wilcox, Wyoming. Following the robbery, they fled to the Hole-in-the-Wall, successfully evading posses in pursuit. Kid Curry, who was by this time a member of the gang, killed Converse County Sheriff Josiah Hazen during that pursuit. The gang split up in different directions for a time, a common action following any of their robberies.

== Killing of Sheriff Farr, Deputy Kearney, and Deputy Love ==
Cassidy, Lay, Kid Curry, and other gang members Sam Ketchum and Bill Carver headed to New Mexico. On July 11, 1899, without Cassidy, Lay led Curry, Ketchum and Carver in the robbery of a train near Folsom, New Mexico. The robbery was successful, but a well-led posse under the direction of Huerfano County (Colorado) Sheriff Ed Farr soon cornered them near an area known as Turkey Creek. In the first gun battle that followed, Doña Ana County Deputy Kent Kearney was shot, dying the next day. Another deputy was wounded, and outlaw Sam Ketchum was badly wounded.

The gang escaped this immediate threat, but Ketchum's bad wounds held them up, and again they were cornered in the same area on July 16, 1899. They engaged Sheriff Farr and Colfax County Deputy Henry Love in a gun battle, resulting in Farr being killed and Love dying a few days later from his wounds. Lay was also wounded, but escaped (as did Curry and Carver). Ketchum, however, was captured and died in custody from his wounds.

== Captured, convicted and pardoned ==
On August 16, 1899, while gathering supplies, Lay was cornered in Carlsbad, New Mexico, and captured. He was subsequently charged and convicted of the killings and the robbery. He received a life sentence which he began serving in the New Mexico State Penitentiary. Maude divorced Lay.

Lay spent seven years in prison, where he became a trustee to the warden. In this role, he once accompanied the warden to Santa Fe. Upon their return, they found that the inmates had taken the warden's wife and daughter hostage inside the prison. Lay was able to convince the prisoners to release the women, and for this act he was pardoned by Governor Miguel Antonio Otero on January 10, 1906.

== Retirement from crime ==
Upon his release, Lay found his way to Baggs, Wyoming, a small ranch town just north of the Colorado border. There he worked as an oil explorer and saloon owner without much success. There he met and married Mary Calvert. They moved to Southern California, where Lay supervised the building of the All American Canal system in Riverside and Imperial Valley just north of the border with Mexico. He and Mary raised two children, a son and a daughter.

== The end of the Wild Bunch ==
When Lay was captured, Cassidy, Kid Curry, and Bill Carver all left New Mexico. The loss of Lay deeply affected Cassidy, who for a time made attempts at getting amnesty from the Governor of Utah. Several killings committed by Kid Curry and other robberies committed by the gang made this impossible.

No objective proof exists that Lay had contact with Wild Bunch members after his release, but there is suggestive testimony. Josie Bassett on separate occasions told her cousin, her neighbor, and local historians she had been visited by Butch Cassidy and Elza Lay "in 1930 in Baggs, Wyoming". Before that, Cassidy and the Sundance Kid had gone to South America, where they were alleged to have been killed while committing a robbery in Bolivia. During Lay's imprisonment, Kid Curry was killed during a shootout with lawmen in Colorado. Ben Kilpatrick and Laura Bullion were captured in St. Louis, Missouri, and George "Flat Nosed" Curry was killed by lawmen in Utah. Several other members of other gangs that had been a part of the Hole-in-the-Wall Gang were also by that time either dead or in prison.

Lay died on November 10, 1934, in Los Angeles. He is buried at Forest Lawn in Glendale, California, near Los Angeles.
