= Butch Cassidy's Wild Bunch =

Old West train robbing gang

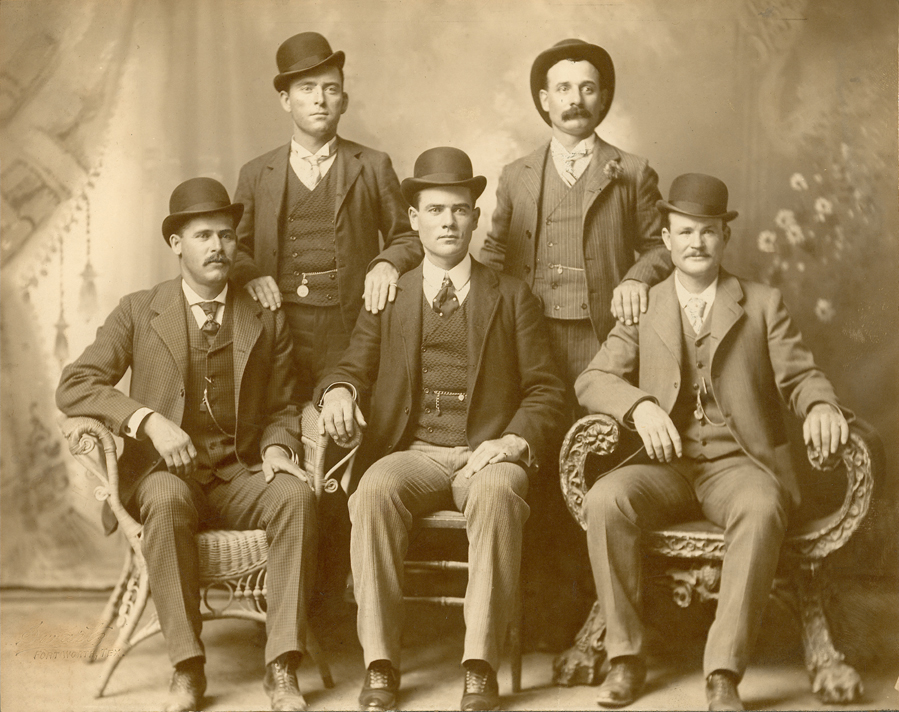
- Fort Worth, Texas, 1900. Left to right: Sundance Kid, Will Carver, Ben Kilpatrick, Harvey Logan, Butch Cassidy.
- Founded by: Butch Cassidy
- Founding location: Hole-in-the-Wall, Big Horn Mountains, Johnson County, Wyoming
- Years active: 1899–1901
- Territory: Northern Wyoming
- Ethnicity: European-American
- Membership (est.): 19
- Criminal activities: Horse and cattle theft, stagecoach and highway robbery, store and bank robbery

Butch Cassidy's Wild Bunch was one of the loosely organized outlaw gangs operating out of the Hole-in-the-Wall, near Kaycee in Wyoming, a natural fortress of caves, with a narrow entrance that was constantly guarded. In the beginning, the gang was referred to as the "Hole in the Wall Gang" during the Old West era in the United States. It was popularized by the 1969 movie, Butch Cassidy and the Sundance Kid, and took its name from the original Wild Bunch. The gang was led by Butch Cassidy, and it included his closest friends Elzy Lay, the Sundance Kid, Tall Texan, News Carver, Camillo "Deaf Charley" Hanks, Laura Bullion, Flat-Nose Curry, Kid Curry, and Bub Meeks.

== History ==
The Wild Bunch gang claimed to make every attempt to abstain from killing people, and Cassidy boasted of having never killed a single man or woman in his entire career. These claims were false, however. Kid Curry, "Flat-Nose" Curry, Will "News" Carver, and other members of the gang killed numerous people during their flight from law enforcement. Kid Curry alone killed nine lawmen while with the gang, and another two civilians during shootouts, becoming the gang's most feared member. Elzy Lay killed another two lawmen following a robbery, for which he was wounded, arrested, and sentenced to life imprisonment. George Curry killed at least two lawmen, before being killed by Grand County, Utah, lawmen.

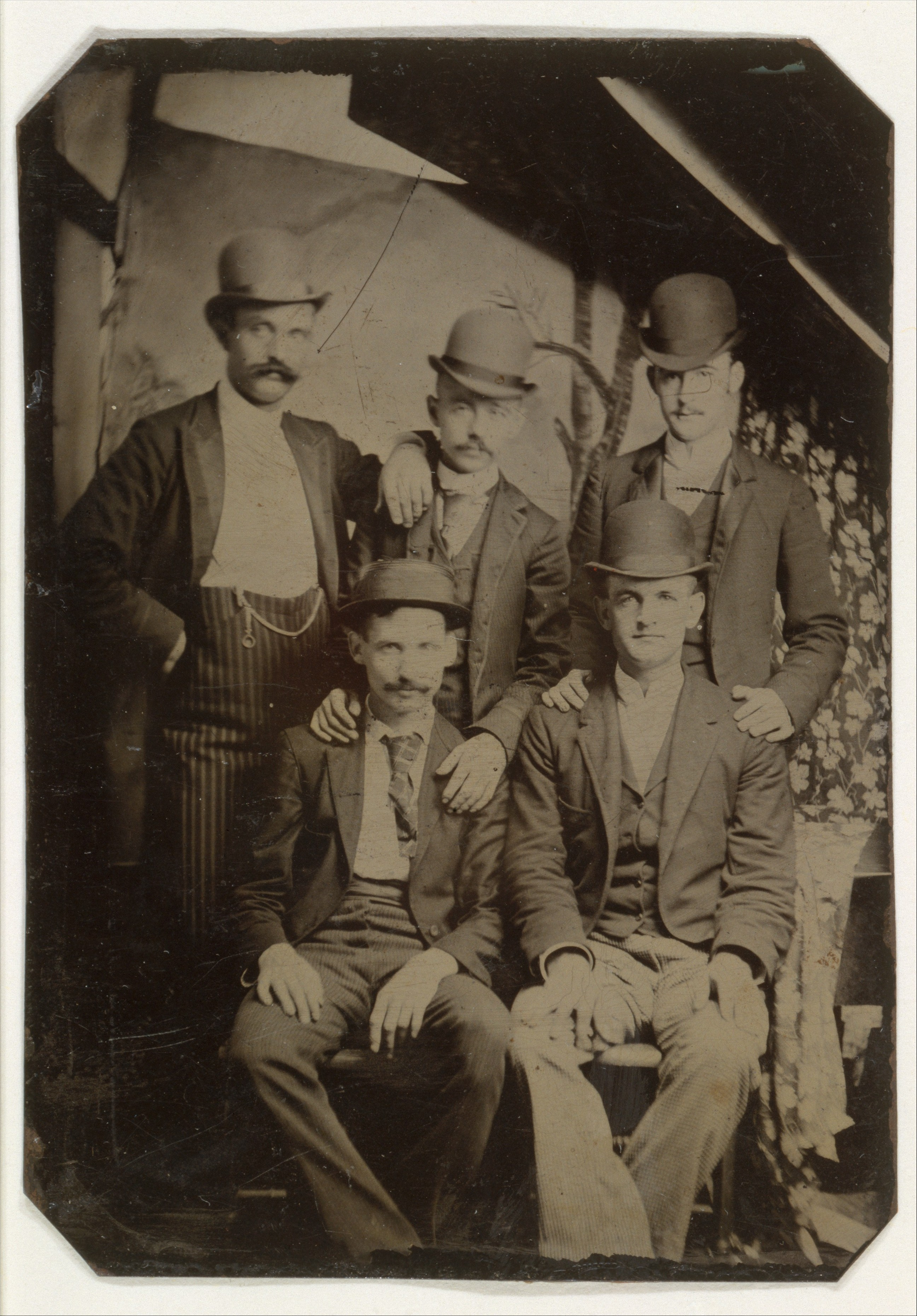
A 1892 tintype portrait of five members of the "Wild Bunch" gang dressed in bowler hats and city clothes shows, clockwise, from the top left, Kid Curry, Bill McCarty, Bill (Tod) Carver, Ben Kilpatrick, and Tom O'Day

The gang was also closely associated with female outlaws Ann Bassett and Josie Bassett, whose ranch near Browns Park supplied the gang often with fresh horses and beef. Both Bassett girls became romantically involved with several members of the gang, and both occasionally accompanied the gang to one of their hideouts, called "Robbers Roost". Associations with ranchers like these in the area allowed the gang considerable mobility, giving them an easy resupply of fresh horses and supplies, and a place to hole up for a night or two.

At 1:00 am on June 2, 1899, Cassidy, Sundance Kid, Harvey Logan, and Lay robbed a Union Pacific train near Wilcox, Wyoming. They wore masks made from white napkins, possibly pilfered from a Harvey House restaurant. In the holdup, they stole between $30,000 and $60,000. The gang split up afterward, a common ploy to throw off pursuers, and several fled to New Mexico. On July 11, 1899, gang members robbed a train near Folsom, New Mexico, without Cassidy's presence. The pursuit by a posse led by Sheriff Ed Farr culminated in two gun battles, during which Sheriff Farr and two deputies were killed. Gang member Sam Ketchum was wounded and died in custody. Elzy Lay, one of Cassidy's closest friends and cofounder of the Wild Bunch gang, was wounded and also captured.

Cassidy and the other members regrouped in Wyoming. On August 29, 1900, Cassidy, the Sundance Kid, Kid Curry, and another unidentified gang member believed to have been Will Carver, held up another Union Pacific train at Tipton, Wyoming. Less than a month later, on September 19, 1900, they raided the First National Bank of Winnemucca, Nevada, stealing $32,640. These and other lucrative robberies led to much notoriety and fame.

=== End of the Wild Bunch ===
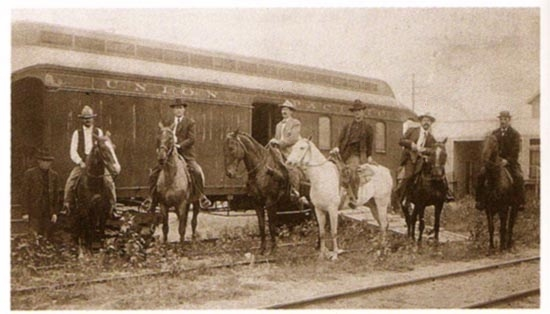
A posse was assembled to fight the Wild Bunch in 1900.

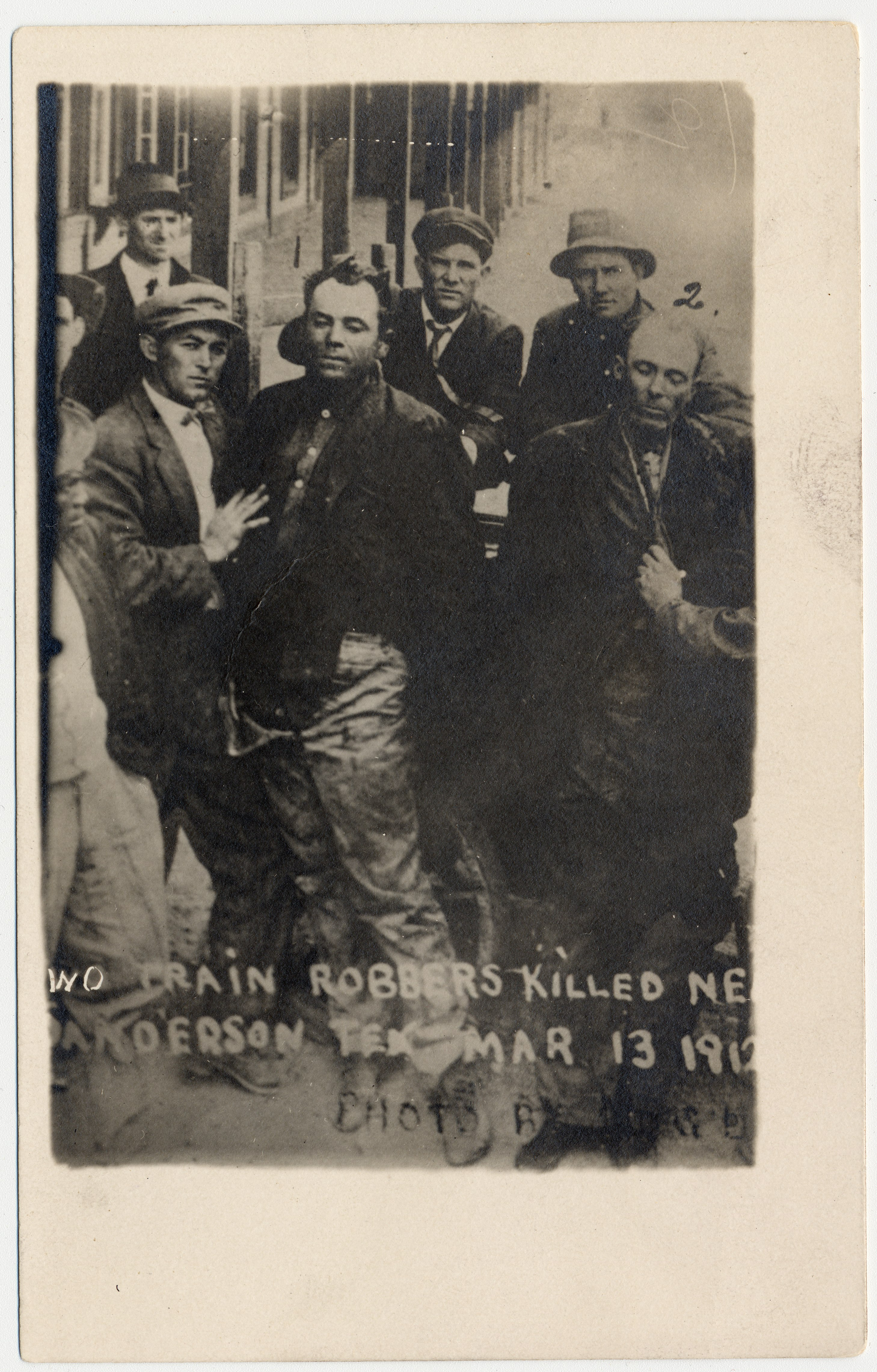
Photograph shows the bodies of Ben Kilpatrick and Ole Hobek being held up by others after being killed near Sanderson Texas, March 13, 1912

In early 1901, Cassidy, the Sundance Kid, and Sundance's girlfriend Etta Place relocated to Argentine Patagonia, where they spent time at La Leona, 110 km from El Calafate in the province of Santa Cruz, to escape the pursuit of Pinkerton detectives and other lawmen.

That same year, Will Carver was wounded by lawmen on April 1 and died in May. Ben Kilpatrick and Laura Bullion were captured in Tennessee in December 1901; he received a 20-year prison sentence and she was sentenced to five years.

Kid Curry killed two lawmen in Knoxville, Tennessee; he escaped capture and traveled to Montana, where he killed the rancher who had killed his brother Johnny years before. He was captured on his return to Tennessee, but escaped again. Kid Curry was claimed to have killed himself in Colorado in 1904 during a shootout with lawmen, for he had said that no lawman would ever take him alive.

In November 1908, Cassidy and Sundance are believed to have been killed in a shootout with the Bolivian Army; the exact circumstances of their fate continue to be disputed.

Etta Place disappeared. Her last known sighting was in San Francisco, 1909. It was suspected that she had reinvented herself as a brothel and hotel owner named Eunice Gray, in Fort Worth, Texas; recent photographic evidence refutes this theory.

Elzy Lay was released from prison in 1906, and after a brief visit to the Bassett ranch in Utah, he relocated to California, where he became a respected businessman; he died there in 1934.

Ben Kilpatrick was released from prison in 1911, and was killed during a train robbery in Texas in 1912.

Laura Bullion was released from prison in 1905, and lived the remainder of her life as a seamstress, dying in Memphis, Tennessee, in 1961, the last survivor of the Wild Bunch.

=== In popular culture ===
- The Three Outlaws (1956), starring Neville Brand as Butch Cassidy and Alan Hale Jr as the Sundance Kid, is a fictional film of the duo's exploits with Wild Bunch member William "News" Carver as the third outlaw in the title.
- Butch Cassidy and the Sundance Kid (1969) was directed by George Roy Hill and written by William Goldman (who won the Academy Award for Best Original Screenplay for the film).
- Drifters (2009–?), is a manga featuring Butch Cassidy and Sundance Kid as supporting characters to the protagonists. They are transported to a fantasy world after their deaths and help aid in the fight against the genocidal "Black King".
- The Van der Linde gang from Rockstar Games' Red Dead Redemption 2 is inspired by the Wild Bunch; in 1899, the gang robs a train by blowing up one of the cars which carries valuables, leading to the Pinkertons pursuing them. The gang's leader then begins conspiring to escape to a tropical island. Rockstar recommended the film 'Butch Cassidy and the Sundance Kid' to their fans.

== See also ==
- Red Lopez
