= Ann Bassett =

American rancher (1878–1956)

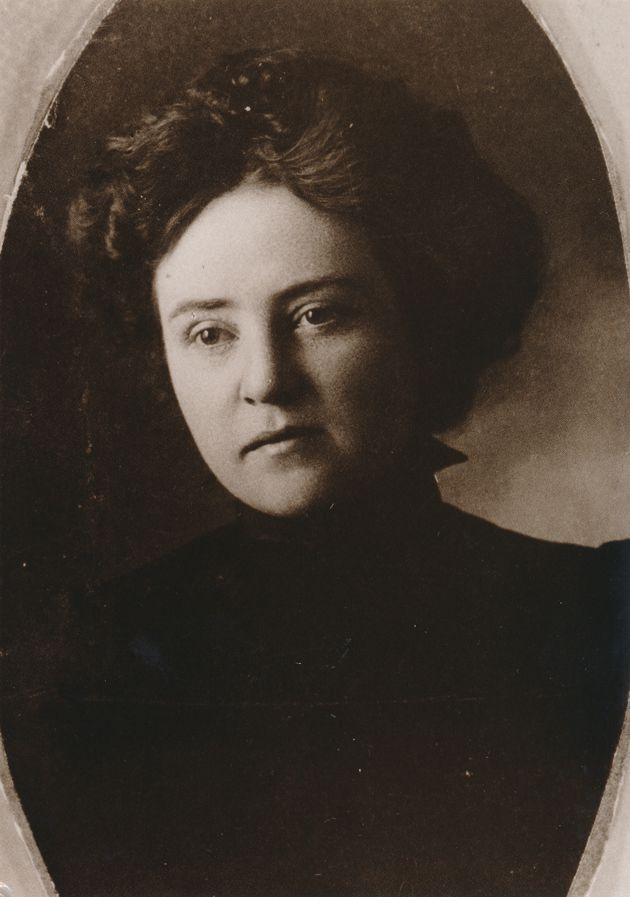
- Ann Bassett Willis c. 1904
- Born: Anna M. Bassett; May 12, 1878; Moffat County, Colorado
- Died: May 8, 1956 (aged 77); Leeds, Washington County, Utah
- Resting place: Bassett Cemetery; 40°47′29.04″N 108°50′44.88″W
- Other names: Queen Ann Bassett, Queen Ann, Cattle Queen
- Occupations: Western Rancher; Presumed Cattle Rustler
- Known for: Association with outlaws such as Butch Cassidy's Wild Bunch; Romantically involved with Butch Cassidy and Ben Kilpatrick; Alleged girlfriend of Sundance Kid alias Etta Place
- Spouses: Henry Bernard; Frank Willis
- Parents: Amos Herbert Bassett; Elizabeth Chamberlin Bassett
- Relatives: Josie Bassett

Ann Bassett (May 12, 1878 – May 8, 1956), also known as Queen Ann Bassett, was a prominent female rancher of the Old West, and with her sister Josie Bassett, was an associate of outlaws, particularly Butch Cassidy's Wild Bunch.

== Early life ==
Bassett was born to Herb Bassett and Elizabeth Chamberlin Bassett near Browns Park, Colorado in 1878, but grew up in Utah, the second of two daughters. Her sister Josie was born in 1874. Herb Bassett was 20 years senior to his wife Elizabeth Chamberlain Bassett, and the couple moved to Browns Park some time around the earlier part of 1888. The Bassetts had a profitable cattle ranch that straddled Utah, Wyoming, and Colorado. They often did business with notable outlaws of the era such as Butch Cassidy, Harvey "Kid Curry" Logan, and Black Jack Ketchum, selling them horses and beef for supplies. The park, as Browns Park is known, had been a haven for outlaws long before Butch and the boys started running stolen livestock through there. For decades, stolen horses were trailed through the park to thriving mining communities in Eastern Colorado. Both Ann and Josie Bassett were attractive young women, well taught by their mother in the arts of horse riding, roping, and shooting. Both were educated early on in prominent boarding schools, and were intelligent and articulate in their speech, but chose to return to the life of ranching. Many accounts state the sisters always preferred "cowboying" to being a lady.

By the time Ann Bassett was 15, she had become involved romantically with Butch Cassidy. Her sister Josie was involved with Elzy Lay. Outlaws Ben Kilpatrick and Will "News" Carver, who were both later members of the Wild Bunch gang, also dated the sisters. These associations were what first exposed Bassett to outlaws.

== Association with outlaws ==
In 1896, several wealthy cattle barons in the area made attempts to purchase the Bassett ranch from the Bassetts. When the Bassetts refused, the barons began to rustle their cattle. Ann and her sister Josie, in turn, rustled cattle from them. This led to a feud, and resulted in the cattlemen bringing in hired killer Tom Horn to deal with what the cattlemen deemed to be criminals. Horn eliminated several known rustlers during that time, but took no action against the Bassetts. While he also killed two rustlers in 1900, Isom Dart and Matt Rash (a sandy-haired Texas cowboy), who were known to be associated with the Bassett family, this was unrelated to the Bassett conflict with their neighbors.

By 1896, Josie Bassett was heavily involved in a relationship with Elzy Lay, Cassidy's closest friend. Josie had also become involved with Cassidy shortly after his release from an 18-month prison sentence, during which time Ann was involved with Ben Kilpatrick. When Elzy Lay began a relationship with a woman named Maude Davis, Josie became involved with Will "News" Carver, and Ann returned to her involvement with Cassidy. Through their relationships with the outlaws, and in exchange for their supplying the outlaws with beef and fresh horses from their ranch, the two sisters were in a position to get assistance from Cassidy and his gang in dealing with certain cattlemen who were pressing them to sell.

This association was a deterrent that kept cowboys hired to harass the sisters from doing so, for fear of retribution from the outlaws. Reportedly, Kid Curry, the most feared member of the Wild Bunch gang, once paid a visit to several cowboys known to be employed by the cattlemen, warning them to leave the Bassetts alone. Although the problems with the wealthy cattlemen's association continued well into 1902, by late 1899, the problems were rare, and little pressure was placed on the sisters to sell their ranch. Despite the seemingly constant changes in romantic partners by both the Bassett sisters and the gang members, no animosity was reported to occur as a result of this.

Although both sisters were taking part in the fight against the powerful cattlemen's associations, Ann became better known, with newspapers, as well as friends, dubbing her "Queen" Ann Bassett. In early 1897, Bassett joined Cassidy at Robbers Roost. Elzy Lay, having ended his relationship with Josie Bassett, joined them with his girlfriend and future wife Maude Davis. According to reports of the day, Bassett and Davis were two of only five women ever allowed into the Robbers Roost hideout, the other three being Josie Bassett, the Sundance Kid's girlfriend Etta Place, and Wild Bunch gang member Laura Bullion.

By April, 1897, the two women were sent home so Cassidy and his gang could concentrate on their next robbery. Cassidy continued his romantic involvement with Bassett off and on for another four years, seeing her whenever he was near her ranch. The total length of their relationship was around seven years, but was interrupted often with his being away, and for an 18-month period when he was in prison starting in 1894, during which time she was involved with Ben Kilpatrick.

By 1903, Bassett had married a rancher by the name of Hyrum "Hi" Henry Bernard. Shortly after the marriage, she was arrested for cattle rustling. She stood trial, but was acquitted and released. The marriage lasted six years, ending in divorce, with Bernard helping Bassett and her sister Josie in maintaining their ranch.

By 1904, most of the outlaws associated with the Bassett girls were either dead or had been captured by lawmen. Ann Bassett never saw Cassidy again after he first departed for South America. Several other outlaws from lesser-known gangs drifted in and out of the ranch, usually visiting only to obtain beef or fresh horses, and have a place to stay for a few days. Elzy Lay reportedly visited the ranch again in 1906, shortly after his release from prison, before moving on to California, where he lived out the remainder of his life as a respectable businessman. Herb Bassett died on July 30, 1918.

== Later life ==
Ann Bassett remarried in 1928 to cattleman Frank Willis. The couple remained in Utah, where they maintained a ranch. She remained there for the rest of her life. Willis reportedly loved her dearly, and the two worked closely together in their business. Before she died, she requested that she be cremated, and that her remains be spread across her hometown in northern Utah. However, Willis is alleged to have grieved greatly over her death, and was unable to complete that task, keeping her ashes in his car for the remainder of his life. When he died in 1963, friends and family were the ones who buried her ashes in an undisclosed area in Browns Park.

== Alleged Ann Bassett–Etta Place connection ==
Ann Bassett and Etta Place, the girlfriend of the Sundance Kid, have often been alleged to have been the same person. In spite of enthusiastic efforts to conflate them as one and the same, evidence confirms that Bassett was under arrest for cattle rustling in Utah while Place was in South America with Cassidy and Longabaugh in 1903.

Still, some speculators insist Bassett led a double life, dating Cassidy as Ann Bassett, and the Sundance Kid as Etta Place. Reports by the Pinkerton National Detective Agency provide almost identical descriptions of both women, describing them as having classic good looks, articulate speech and intelligence, the same hair color, as being good with a rifle and riding a horse, and being very promiscuous for the period, both having openly taken several lovers in a period when one did not generally flaunt such relationships. This would mean that at some point she was involved with both outlaws at the same time, apparently with their full knowledge, but by 1900, when in their company, she simply went by the name of Etta Place. Place mysteriously disappears from all public records in 1909, not long after the death of the Sundance Kid.

When comparing the best legitimate photograph of Place with the best photograph of Bassett, it appears that at least, the women could have been mistaken for one another. Both are pretty, with similar facial features, hair color, and physical build. Michael Rutters' book Bad Girls details how Bassett often faked a New England accent in order to appear more cultured. Similarly, Place was said to have indicated that she was from the East Coast, though she never revealed an exact location. Stronger evidence comes from Dr. Thomas G. Kyle of the Computer Research Group at Los Alamos National Laboratory, who has previously performed many such comparisons for government intelligence agencies. He conducted a series of tests on photographs of Etta Place and Ann Bassett. Their features matched and both had the same scar or cowlick at the top of their forehead. He concluded that there could be no reasonable doubt that they were the same person.

Author and researcher Doris Karren Burton indicates in her 1992 book Queen Ann Bassett: Alias Etta Place that when Bassett is absent from historical records, Place is actively traveling with Cassidy and the Sundance Kid/Harry Longabaugh, and when Place is absent from historical records, Bassett is visible.

However, Burton did not account for documented instances showing Bassett to have been in the United States at the same time that Etta Place was known to have been in South America. Bassett was under arrest for cattle rustling in Utah while Place, who had departed for South America with Longabaugh in August, 1902, was there with Cassidy and Longabaugh until returning to the United States (via New York City) in the summer of 1904. In 1903 alone Bassett was married, incarcerated, tried, and released over a span of several months. Further, Bassett never claimed to have been Etta Place, even in her memoirs.
