= Elizabeth Bassett (cattle rustler) =

American pioneer and cattle rancher (1855–1892)

- Born: Mary Eliza Chamberlain; 25 August 1855; Arkansas
- Died: 1892 (aged 36–37); Colorado
- Resting place: Bassett Cemetery, Browns Park
- Occupations: Western Rancher; Presumed Cattle Rustler
- Known for: Leader of Bassett Gang
- Spouse: Herbert Bassett
- Parents: Ewell Chamberlain; Hannah Miller
- Relatives: Josie Bassett, Samuel Bassett, Ann Bassett

Mary Elizabeth Bassett (née Chamberlain; 1855 or 1858 – December 1892), commonly known as Elizabeth and Eliza Bassett, was a Wild West pioneer, cattle rancher, and cattle rustler. Born in Magnet Cove, Arkansas, and raised by her maternal grandparents, Bassett grew up in an equestrian household and community. As a young woman, she migrated west with her husband Herbert Bassett and their young daughter. Mary Eliza (as she was called during childhood) changed her name to Elizabeth when she moved Westward. By all accounts, Elizabeth was a strong, outdoorsy woman, and her marriage to Herb Bassett was unusually open-minded for the era.

The Bassetts lived and worked according to their specific talents and interests, rather than traditional gender roles. Elizabeth ran the cattle and sheep ranch, and raised thoroughbred horses. Her husband Herb managed the agricultural operations and taught their children. When large cattle companies began to push out small cattle ranchers and homesteaders, Bassett organized other locals to fight back. Her daughters Ann and Josie Bassett became notable in their own right. Butch Cassidy and the Sundance Kid were close family friends of the Bassetts, and often stayed and worked at the ranch to "cool down" following their illegal escapades.

== Early life ==
Mary Eliza Chamberlain, born 1855, was the daughter of Hannah Emerson Miller (1840–1861) and Ewell Chamberlain (1825–1864), a Confederate Sergeant during the Civil War who was wounded on May 6, 1864, and died on June 16, 1864, in Lynchburg, Virginia of his wounds, following amputation of his leg.

Having lost her mother Hannah when Mary Eliza was only 6, and her father to the Civil War, Mary Eliza was separated from her baby sister and taken in to live with her maternal grandparents, the Millers, on their homestead in Magnet Cove, Arkansas. Her father was at war when her mother died giving birth to her baby sister, and Mary and the baby were probably presumed to be at the Miller home temporarily until their father returned home from war. He died in Lynchburg in 1864, and Mary Eliza remained with the Millers while her sister Hannah was sent to live with an elderly aunt.

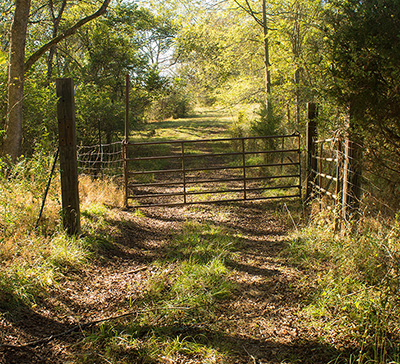
View of the Miller homestead where Mary Eliza grew up

Her maternal grandfather was George (aka "Judge") Crawford Miller and her grandmother was Mary Miller (née Emerson). Her other grandfather William Chamberlain lived just up the road, but was widowed before Mary Eliza was born, and would not have been considered suitable to raise two granddaughters.

Her daughter Ann said of her:

Mother was a woman of truly distinctive personality, with many remarkable qualities. From childhood she had been required to do nothing more fatiguing than to summon a negro slave to perform even slight tasks for her. But she neither faltered, nor gazed longingly back to those early experiences, when her life's connections were broken by the Civil War. She looked ahead, seeing adventure and alluring excitement as my father's helpmeet and companion in the new West.

— Ann Bassett Willis

== Marriage ==
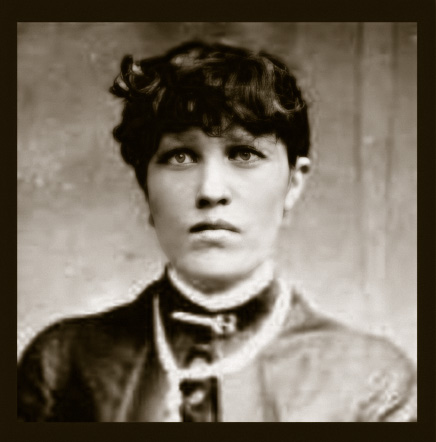
undated photo attributed as Mary Elizabeth Chamberlain Bassett

In 1868, Mary Eliza Chamberlain met Amos Herbert Bassett, a former Union soldier, when he arrived in Hot Springs, Arkansas. Herbert served the Union Army during the Civil War. After the war, he worked for the Internal Revenue Service as a collector in Illinois, Virginia and Arkansas. In March 1871, Mary Eliza's grandfather George Crawford Miller died intestate, and his belongings were divided among his surviving family members, including Mary Eliza. In September of that year, Herbert and Eliza were wed in Hot Springs. Only a few years later, they headed west via train to Rock Springs, Wyoming, and then south along the Green River, where they visited Herbert's brother Samuel Clark Bassett, who was a United States government scout along the Overland Trail. In 1877, the Bassett family, which now included daughter Josie and son Sam, moved to the rugged frontier area of Browns Park, known for "cattle rustling and outlaw sheltering". Their daughter Ann was born in 1878. She was the first white child born in Browns Park. Herbert, a scholar and musician in weak health, was out of place in an area that required hard labor. Bassett realized that she needed to provide a living for the family and became a cattle rancher and rustler. She relied on Isam Dart, who was a ranch hand who also cooked meals, washed laundry, cut wood, and performed other household duties for the family. Josie and Ann attended Miss Porter's select Finishing School for Girls in Boston for a proper education, and they were also proficient horseback riders and ropers. Elizabeth advocated for women's right to vote, was interested in feminism, and believed in one's roles should be based upon talent and interest, rather than gender. Herbert schooled the children and she ran the ranch.

== Ranch and farm ==
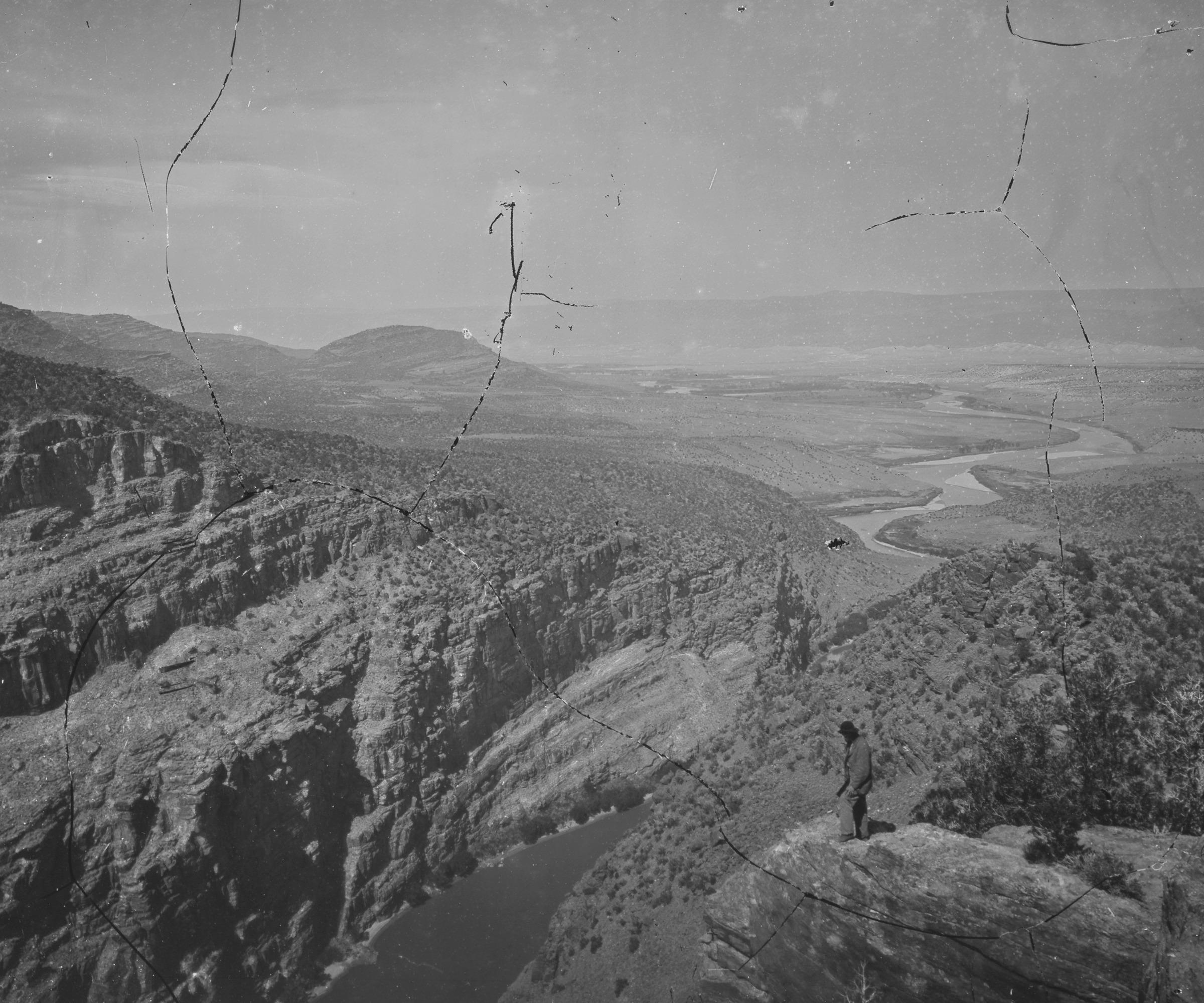
Browns Park from Entrance to Canyon of Lodore.

The Bassetts were among the first homesteaders at Browns Park, located within a valley that is five miles wide and thirty miles long. The area was good for cattle ranching, where the surrounding mountains protected the valley against the cold winter weather. In addition, there was an abundance of sweet grass and fresh water. In 1878, the Bassetts built a log house, with a well-stocked library, for their cattle ranch. It was located near the entrance to Lodore Canyon and alongside a clear mountain spring. The house was partially furnished from belongings that she inherited from her Arkansas grandfather's estate, combined with furniture hand-made locally of wood, leather, and buckskin.

The initial years were hard. Bassett hunted wild game. The Native Americans taught them how to fish, what plants to harvest, and how to make jerky. The Bassetts grew grain and hay and raised horses, cattle, and sheep. They welcomed day and overnight visitors and they participated in and hosted dances. Bassett was kind to her family, neighbors, and ranch hands. Members of the Wild Bunch, including Butch Cassidy and the Sundance Kid, often stayed at the ranch to "cool off." They worked as ranch hands and were close friends of the Bassett family. Butch Cassidy hid at the ranch after he robbed the Telluride Bank in 1889.

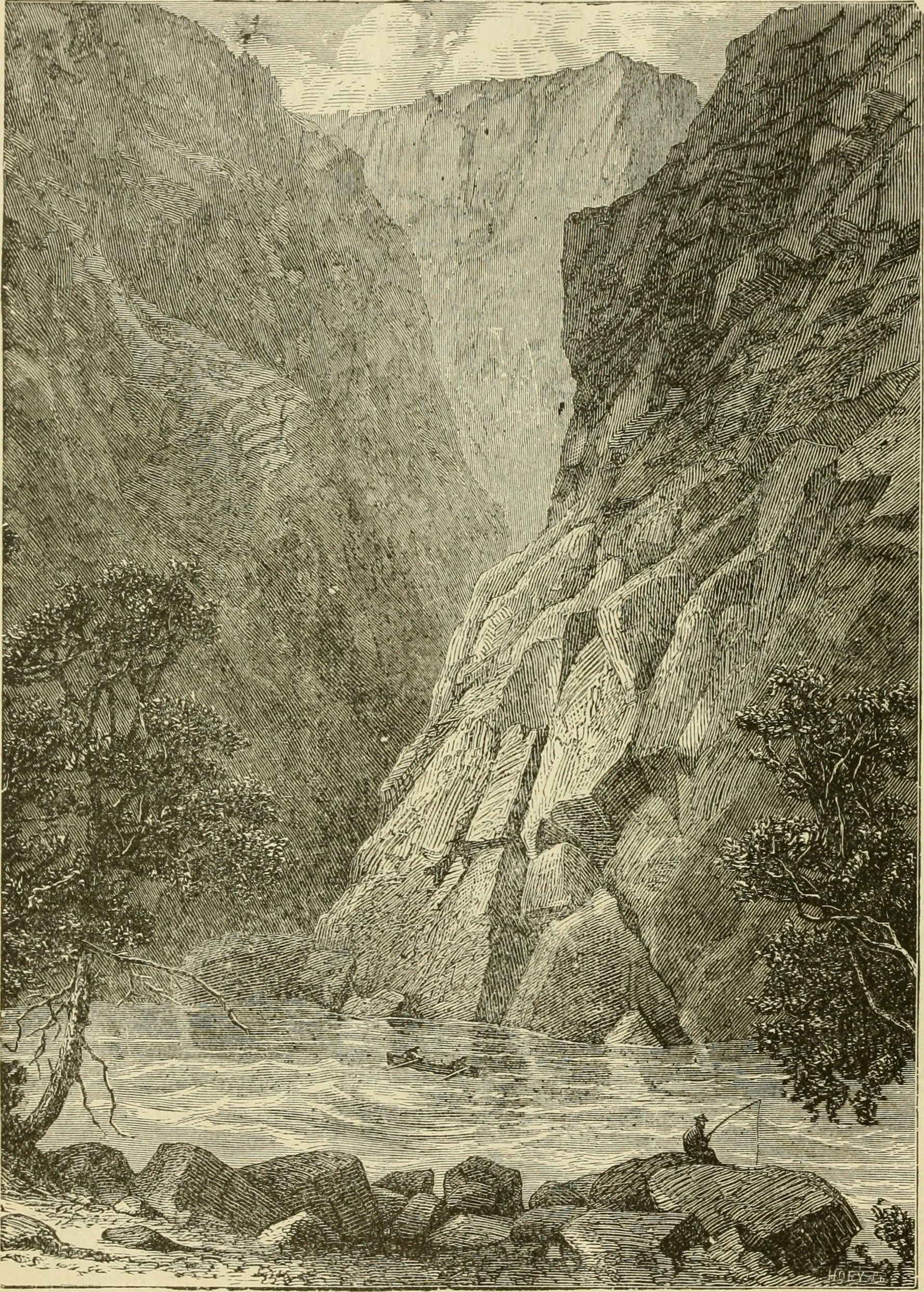
Canyon of the Lodore and Green Rivers, Wyoming

Following the Meeker Massacre (1879), Herbert took the children to Rock Springs in Wyoming to avoid hostilities between the Ute People and the United States government. Bassett wanted to stay behind to oversee the ranch, but Herbert was adamant that she leave with the rest of the family. One year later, they returned to their ranch to find it had not been burned down as feared. She focused much of her attention on breeding thoroughbred horses, which was her passion. Herbert planted an orchard and grew plants in the family's garden.

As investors and cattle monopolies sought to move Native Americans to reservations, relinquishing more prime land, they began to buy large tracts of land and began to push out homesteaders and small ranches. The large concerns, backed by the influential Wyoming Stock Growers Association, sought to create a poor opinion of the smaller ranches in the press by claiming that they were cattle rustlers. A former practice of a community-based roundup of cattle and grouping them by brand ended when the large cattle ranchers rounded up large numbers of cattle, without sorting out the cattle by brand.

== Bassett Gang ==
Bassett decided to band together with other small ranches and homesteaders to prevent cattle from large ranches from grazing on their land. Some also rustled cattle to make up for their cattle that had been rounded up by the large ranches.

Bassett became the leader of what was called the Bassett Gang, which included Isam Dart, Matt Rash, Jim McKnight, and Angus McDougal. She was a charming woman, skilled in riding horses, shooting rifles, and executing her plans. Bassett honored treaties made with Native Americans.

According to John Rolfe Burroughs, author of Where the Old West Stayed Young, "Technically, rustling cattle was a felony offense. It is not an exaggeration to say, however, that with very few exceptions, everybody. . .in Brown's Park engaged in it."

== Death ==
Bassett died of an internal injury—such as a burst appendix—in December 1892 at age 37.
