= Eunice Gray =

American brothel owner

- Died: January 26, 1962; Fort Worth, Texas, US
- Body discovered: Waco Hotel; 110 East 15th Street
- Occupations: Brothel and hotel owner
- Known for: Speculative belief of Eunice Gray assuming the identity of Sundance Kid's girlfriend Etta Place

Eunice Gray (1884 - January 26, 1962) was a brothel and hotel owner and operator in Fort Worth, Texas from 1909 to 1962. She is best known for the belief that she was Etta Place, the former girlfriend of the famous outlaw Harry Alonzo Longabaugh, aka the Sundance Kid, who was allegedly killed in a shootout in South America in November 1908. For many years, there were no known photographs of Eunice Gray; but two photographs recently were found that appear to demonstrate that she could not have been Etta Place.

== Arrival in Fort Worth ==
Gray was described as a beautiful woman, and according to Pinkerton reports, she arrived in Fort Worth, Texas, and began running a brothel in 1909 after Etta Place had been seen for the last time in San Francisco, where she may have requested assistance in obtaining a death certificate for Longabaugh, in an effort to settle his estate.

== Speculation about Eunice Gray being Etta Place ==
Gray was semi-wealthy, and many speculated that she was in fact Etta Place. She never made any indication that she was, but instead she avoided the topic altogether. She ran her brothel until at least 1925, at which time she took over the Waco Hotel, located at 110 E. 15th Street in Fort Worth. Contrary to common belief, the connections between Place and Gray did not establish themselves to any great extent at the time she arrived in Fort Worth, but rather many years afterwards.

During her entire time in Fort Worth, she gave one interview, in which she told Delbert Willis of the Fort Worth Press: "I've lived in Fort Worth since 1901. That is except for the time I had to high-tail it out of town. Went to South America for a few years . . . until things settled down". This traditionally has been thought to be something to do with J. Frank Norris, an anti-vice crusader. He did not arrive in Fort Worth until 1909, and his infamous siege of Hell's Half Acre, the city's red-light district, didn't occur until 1912. Etta Place, by contrast, was in South America from February 1901 to June 1906. Willis also conceded that Gray never admitted or even claimed to be Etta Place; he merely made that connection on his own, given the similarities of their age, the fact that both had classic good looks, and that the period in which Gray said she went to South America coincided, albeit roughly, with when Place was in South America.

== Photographic evidence ==
For many years, there were no known photographs of Gray in that period to compare with the one known high-quality photograph of Place. Willis believed that the similarities were striking, but in the absence of a photograph of Gray, there was no way of verifying or refuting his observation.

More recently, amateur genealogist Donna Donnell found Eunice Gray on a 1911 passenger list from Panama. It was reported in 2007 that she had tracked down Eunice Gray's niece, who had two photographs of her: one wearing her high-school graduation dress circa 1896 and another taken in the 1920s. Comparing the photos with one of Place, both agreed that Eunice Gray was definitely not Etta Place.

== Death and identity ==
In January 1962, Eunice Gray died in the fire which destroyed the Waco Hotel, which she still owned and operated at 110 1/2 East 15th street in Fort Worth, Texas. Documents saved from the fire indicated that she had been born in 1884.

The documents found after the fire further showed that Gray's estate was valued at more than $90,000. There were no letters or communications to verify her family, her origin, or where she had lived between 1901 and 1909.
