= Mount Pleasant, Vinton County, Ohio =

Unincorporated community in Ohio, U.S.

Coordinates: 39°23′34″N 82°27′25″W

Mount Pleasant is an unincorporated community in Vinton County, in the U.S. state of Ohio.

== History ==
An old variant name of the community was New Mount Pleasant. New Mount Pleasant had its start around 1832.

== Notable people ==
- Elzy Lay, Hole in the Wall Gang outlaw
