= William L. Maginnis =

American judge

- Born: William Lyman Maginnis; November 4, 1858; Somerset, Ohio
- Died: October 26, 1910 (aged 51); Ogden, Utah
- Occupation: Chief Justice of the Supreme Court of Wyoming Territory
- Political party: Democratic Party

William Lyman Maginnis (November 4, 1858 – October 26, 1910) was Chief Justice of the Supreme Court of Wyoming Territory from November 8, 1886 to October 1, 1889.

== Early life and career ==
Born in Somerset, Ohio, he attended schools in Zanesville, Ohio, and St. Vincent College in Latrobe, Pennsylvania. He was admitted to the bar in the State of Ohio in January 1881 and practiced law in Ohio for the next five years with the exception of nine months spent working on a newspaper in Gunnison, Colorado, from May 1881 to March 1882. On October 16, 1884, he married Letie Abbot of Zanesville; they would have ten children.

== Territorial judicial service ==
Maginnis, who was active in the Democratic Party, was appointed Chief Justice of Wyoming by President Grover Cleveland in October 1886. During his term as Chief Justice, Maginnis took part in decisions involving land, water, cattle, railroads, and other issues reflecting Wyoming's economy. His criticism of the powerful Wyoming Stock Growers Association and his position in a case threatening cattlemen-politicians Francis E. Warren and Joseph M. Carey (United States v. Douglas-Willan Sartoris Company, 3 Wyo. 287; 22 P. 92) made him a somewhat controversial figure.

Like other territories, Wyoming had three supreme court justices, who also served as district court judges, the latter function taking most of their time. Maginnis's district was the eastern third of Wyoming, including Cheyenne (Laramie County). The trial court work included divorce, robbery, murder, rustling, and other criminal and civil cases. In one such case, in Sundance (Crook County), on August 5, 1887, Maginnis sentenced to 18 months in prison a young horse thief, Harry Longabaugh, who later became famous as "the Sundance Kid."

== Removal and final years ==
Of the 16 men who served on the Wyoming Territory Supreme Court between 1869 and 1890, Maginnis was the only justice who was removed. Although he had been appointed by the President and confirmed by the U.S. Senate for a four-year term, his tenure was in jeopardy after Cleveland's defeat by Republican Benjamin Harrison in November 1888. During the next several months there were extensive discussions and representations in Wyoming and Washington, D.C., about a possible successor to Maginnis. Shortly after taking office in March 1889, Harrison began removing territorial governors, secretaries, and judges appointed by his Democratic predecessor.

In June 1889, the new U.S. Attorney General sent an examiner, James W. Nightingale, to review several territorial offices, including that of Clerk of the First District Court in Cheyenne. This position was occupied by Luke Murrin, former Civil War officer, first mayor of Cheyenne, saloon keeper, and prominent Democrat, who had been appointed by Maginnis. Nightingale found several administrative and financial failings in Murrin's work and implicated Maginnis. Nightingale's lengthy report reached Attorney General William H. H. Miller on August 27, 1889. The following day, Miller wrote to Harrison recommending Maginnis's removal. On August 30, Harrison approved the removal, and on August 31 he appointed a new chief justice, Willis Van Devanter, a Cheyenne attorney and close associate of the newly appointed Republican Governor Warren and Republican Congressional Delegate Carey. Van Devanter went on to become an associate justice of the U.S. Supreme Court.

Maginnis left office on October 1, 1889, and on the same day moved with his family to Ogden, Utah, where he engaged in private law practice and also served as Assistant U.S. Attorney for Utah, appointed in 1893 by the newly re-elected President Cleveland. Maginnis died in Ogden on October 26, 1910.
