= William Carver (outlaw) =

American outlaw (1868–1901)

Will Carver
- Fort Worth, Texas, 1900
- Born: William Carver; September 12, 1868; Coryell County, Fifth Military District, United States
- Died: April 2, 1901 (aged 32); Sonora, Texas, United States
- Cause of death: Gunshot wounds
- Resting place: Sonora Cemetery
- Other name: News Carver
- Occupation: Cowboy
- Allegiance: Butch Cassidy's Wild Bunch
- Criminal charges: Robbery

William "News" Carver (September 12, 1868 – April 2, 1901) was an American outlaw and a member of Butch Cassidy's Wild Bunch during the closing years of the American Old West. His nickname "News" was given to him because he enjoyed seeing his name in newspaper stories of his gang's exploits. He was ambushed and killed by Sheriff E. S. Briant and his deputies in 1901, an incident appearing in several newspapers.

== Biography ==
=== Early life, outlaw life ===
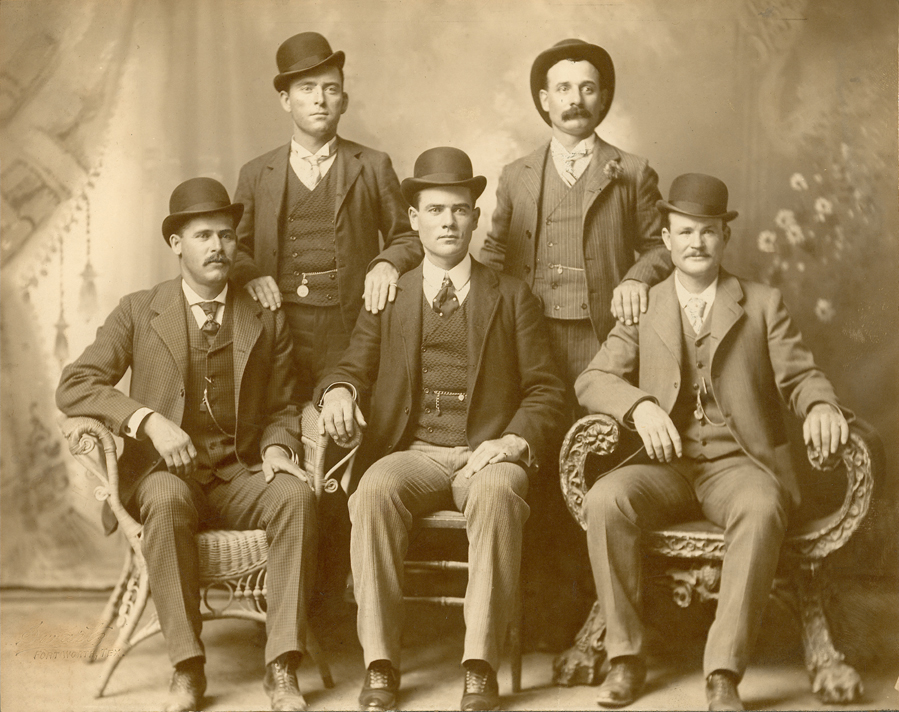
Carver is on the left on the back row; Fort Worth, Texas, 1900. Click a person for more information. Click elsewhere on the image for a larger image.

Carver was born in Coryell County, Texas, in 1868. He worked, for a time, as a cowboy on the "Half Circle Six Ranch" in Tom Green County, before venturing west to Wyoming and Utah. He met and married Viana E. Byler, who was the aunt of future outlaw Laura Bullion. Byler died from fever less than six months into their marriage, and Carver entered into a life as an outlaw. He became involved romantically with outlaw Josie Bassett, sister to outlaw Ann Bassett, then later with Byler's niece, Bullion, less than a year after his wife's death. By 1896 he was riding with the "Black Jack" Ketchum gang, taking part in numerous robberies in New Mexico, and becoming friends with outlaw Ben Kilpatrick.

After a failed robbery, he fled to "Robbers Roost" in Utah, where he began riding with Cassidy's Wild Bunch gang. He gained the nickname "News" for supposedly enjoying seeing his name in newspaper stories of the gang's exploits. He reportedly maintained a close relationship with Josie Bassett throughout that time. By early 1900, Carver was involved with a prostitute named Lille Davis, whom he had met at Fannie Porter's brothel in San Antonio, a place frequented by members of the Wild Bunch gang. This led to friction between him and Bullion, who in turn became involved with Kilpatrick. Within a year, Carver and Bullion were again involved romantically, and Cassidy was planning another big robbery. The gang headed north, and into Wyoming.

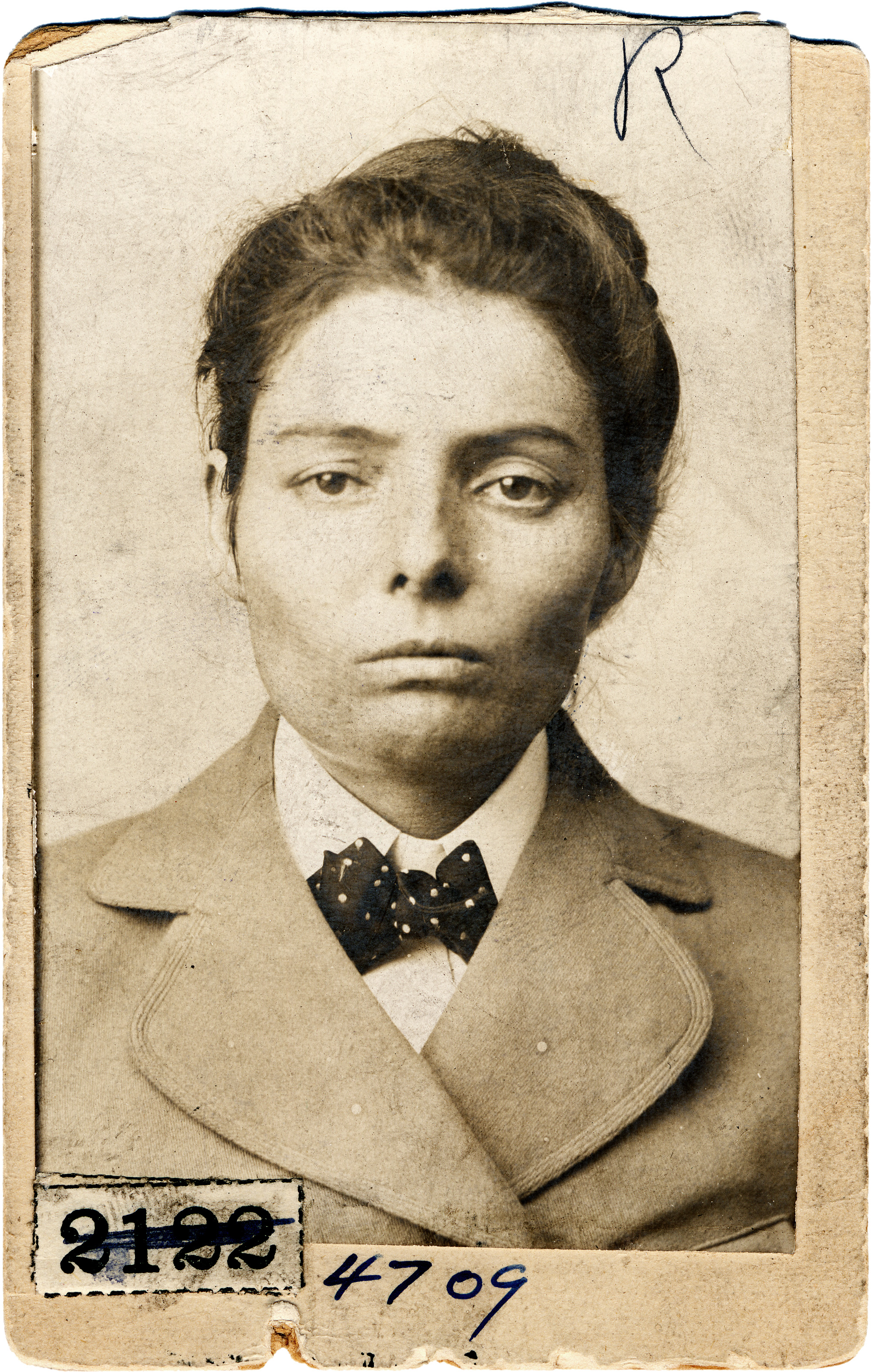
Laura Bullion 1893 Pinkerton mugshot

On August 29, 1900, Carver, Kid Curry, Cassidy, and the Sundance Kid robbed a Union Pacific train near Tipton, Wyoming, with a take that exceeded $30,000. The gang split up to avoid pursuing posses, and Carver fled south. Carver was later involved in the robbery of a "Great Northern" train near Wagner, Montana.

He was shot and killed in Jack Owens' Bakery the night of April 2, 1901 in Sonora, Texas, by Sheriff E. S. "Lige" Briant and his deputies. With guns drawn on entry, they attempted to arrest Carver and George Kilpatrick on suspicion of the murder of Oliver Thornton in Concho County. Kilpatrick made a fumbling motion and Carver's gun never cleared the holster before he was shot six times. Before he died, he was heard muttering "Die game, boys!" Kilpatrick lived, and later cleared Carver of the murder. It was later thought that Harvey "Kid Curry" Logan was responsible for Thornton's murder.

== In popular culture ==
- The Three Outlaws, starring Neville Brand as Butch Cassidy and Alan Hale Jr. as the Sundance Kid, is a 1956 fictional film of the duo's exploits with Wild Bunch member William "News" Carver, portrayed by Robert Christopher, as the third outlaw in the title.
- In Butch Cassidy and the Sundance Kid, Carver is played by Timothy Scott.
- In Butch and Sundance: The Early Days, Carver is played by Christopher Lloyd.
- In Tales of Wells Fargo: The Tall Texan, Carver is played by Clay Randolph.
