= Etta Place =

American companion of the outlaws Butch Cassidy and the Sundance Kid

- Harry Longabaugh, a.k.a. the Sundance Kid, and Etta Place, just before they sailed for South America.
- Born: c. 1878; East Coast, U.S. (alleged)
- Disappeared: July 31, 1909 (aged 30–31); Antofagasta, Chile
- Status: Missing for 117 years, 2 months and 21 days; presumed dead in absentia (Note: Place was never found after her disappearance, but today she would be at an age where it is certain she would be dead.)
- Other name: Ethel Place
- Occupations: Teacher, outlaw
- Partner: Harry Longabaugh (1899–1906)

Etta Place (b. c. 1878, d. ?) was a companion of the American outlaws Robert LeRoy Parker, alias Butch Cassidy, and Harry Alonzo Longabaugh, alias Sundance Kid. The three were members of the outlaw gang known as Butch Cassidy's Wild Bunch. She was principally the companion of Longabaugh. Little is known about her; both her origin and her fate remain unknown.

In 1906 the Pinkerton Detective Agency described her as having "classic good looks, 27 or 28 years old, 5'4" to 5'5" [163–165 cm] in height, weighing between 110 and 115 lb [50 and 52 kg], with a medium build and brown hair."

== Identity theories ==
=== Ethel Bishop ===
Place's real name has been suggested to be Ethel Bishop. A woman by that name lived at a brothel at 212 Concho Street, around the corner from Madame Porter's in San Antonio, the brothel that the Wild Bunch is known to have frequented. On the 1900 census, Bishop's occupation was given as "unemployed music teacher". Born in West Virginia in September 1876, she was 23 at the time. The Ethel Bishop hypothesis combines the claim that she was a schoolteacher with the one that she was a prostitute.

=== Ann Bassett ===
Another conjecture is that she was a cattle rustler named Ann Bassett (1878–1956), who knew and ran with the Wild Bunch at the turn of the 20th century. Both Bassett and Place were attractive women, with similar facial features, body frame, and hair color. Bassett was born in 1878, the same year Place was thought to have been born.

Dr. Thomas G. Kyle of the Computer Research Group at Los Alamos National Laboratory, who performed many photographic comparisons for government intelligence agencies, conducted a series of tests on photographs of Etta Place and Ann Bassett. Both had the same scar or cowlick at the top of their forehead. Dr. Kyle incorrectly concluded that there could be no reasonable doubt they were the same person. Historian Doris Karren Burton also investigated the lives of both women and published a book in 1992 claiming they were one and the same.

However, Bassett and Place's chronologies do not align. Several documents prove that Bassett was in Wyoming during much of the time when Place was in South America. Bassett was arrested and briefly incarcerated in Utah for rustling cattle in 1903, while Place was in South America with Longabaugh and Parker. Bassett also married her first husband in Utah that year, so could not have been in South America during that time.

=== Eunice Gray ===
A once-popular theory held that she was Eunice Gray, who for many years operated a brothel in Fort Worth, and later ran the Waco Hotel there until she died in a fire in January 1962. Gray once told Delbert Willis of the Fort Worth Press, "I've lived in Fort Worth since 1901. That is except for the time I had to high-tail it out of town. Went to South America for a few years ... until things settled down." Willis conceded that Gray never claimed to be Etta Place; he merely made that connection on his own, given the similarities in their ages, and the period in which Gray said she was in South America coinciding with Place's time there. Gray was described as a beautiful woman, and Willis believed that Place and Gray held a striking resemblance to one another, but no photographs of Gray from that period are available to compare with Place's.

In 2007, amateur genealogist Donna Donnell found Eunice Gray on a 1911 passenger list from Panama. Following that lead, she tracked down Gray's niece, who had two photographs of her; one was taken at her high-school graduation circa 1896, and another from sometime in the 1920s. Comparing those photos to Place's, both agreed that Eunice Gray was definitely not Etta Place.

== Life after Longabaugh ==
Considerable debate still remains over when Place's relationship with Longabaugh ended. Some claims indicate that Place ended her relationship with Longabaugh and returned to the United States before his death. Others believe that the two remained romantically involved, and that she simply tired of life in South America. By 1907, she was known to have been living in San Francisco, but after that, she vanished without a trace.

In 1909, a woman matching Place's description asked Frank Aller, U.S. vice consul in Antofagasta, Chile, for assistance in obtaining a death certificate for Longabaugh. No such certificate was issued, and the woman's identity was never ascertained.

Author Richard Llewellyn claimed that while in Argentina, he found indications that Place had moved to Paraguay following the death of Longabaugh, and that she had married a wealthy man. Also, rumors arose that Etta Place was in fact Edith Mae, wife of famous boxing promoter Tex Rickard, who retired to a ranch in Paraguay shortly after promoting the famous fight between Jack Johnson and Jim Jeffries in 1910.

A Pinkerton report states that a woman matching Place's description was killed in a shootout resulting from a domestic dispute with a man named Mateo Gebhart in Chubut, Argentina, in March 1922. Another report claims she committed suicide in 1924 in Argentina, and yet another states that she died of natural causes in 1966.

Various additional claims have been made about her life after the death of Longabaugh. Some believe that she returned to New York City, while other theories suggest she moved back to Texas and started a new life there. One claim is that she returned to her life as a schoolteacher, living the remainder of her life in Denver, Colorado, and another story says she lived the remainder of her life teaching in Marion, Oregon. Also various claims contend that she returned to prostitution, living the remainder of her life in Texas, California, or New York, but these claims are mere speculation, without any supporting evidence.

Researcher Larry Pointer, author of the 1977 book In Search of Butch Cassidy, wrote that Place's identity and fate are "one of the most intriguing riddles in western history. Leads develop only to dissolve into ambiguity."

== Media depictions ==
- In the 1969 film Butch Cassidy and the Sundance Kid, Etta Place is depicted as a schoolteacher. Screenwriter William Goldman was suspicious of claims that Place was a prostitute; he believed she was too attractive and vibrant to have worked as a prostitute, a profession that tended to age women prematurely and tax their health. Place was portrayed in the film by Katharine Ross, who met her future-husband Sam Elliott during filming; they have been married since 1984.
- Elizabeth Montgomery portrayed Etta Place in Mrs. Sundance, a highly fictionalized 1974 television movie.
- Katharine Ross reprised her role as Etta Place in Wanted: The Sundance Woman, a fictionalized 1976 made-for-television movie.
- In the 1994 TV movie The Gambler V: Playing for Keeps, Etta Place is played by Mariska Hargitay.
- In the 2004 TV movie The Legend of Butch & Sundance, Rachelle Lefevre portrays Etta Place.
- Etta Place was played by Dominique McElligott in the 2011 film Blackthorn.
- In 2013 in season 2 episode 3 ("Death Came in Like Thunder") of the television series Longmire, Sheriff Walt Longmire's daughter uses the name Etta Place as an alias when trying to conceal her whereabouts.
- Etta Place was the central character in Etta: A Novel by Gerald Kolpan, published in 2009 by Ballantine Books.

== See also ==
- Outlaws
- American Old West
