= Sundance Kid =

American train robber (1867–1908)

- The Sundance Kid and Etta Place before they left for South America (c. 1901)
- Born: Harry Alonzo Longabaugh; May 24, 1867; Mont Clare, Pennsylvania, U.S.
- Died: November 7, 1908 (aged 41); San Vicente Canton, Bolivia
- Cause of death: Gunshot
- Resting place: San Vicente Cemetery
- Occupations: Thief, bank robber, train robber, criminal gang leader
- Allegiance: Butch Cassidy's Wild Bunch
- Criminal charges: Theft (1887)
- Penalty: 18 months in jail
- Wanted by: Pinkerton Detective Agency
- Accomplices: Ben Kilpatrick; Robert Leroy Parker; Will Carver; Harvey Logan
- Wanted since: ≈1892
- Time at large: 1892–1908

Details
- Span of crimes: 1887–1908
- Country: United States
- States: Wyoming, Montana
- Partner: Etta Place (1899–1906)

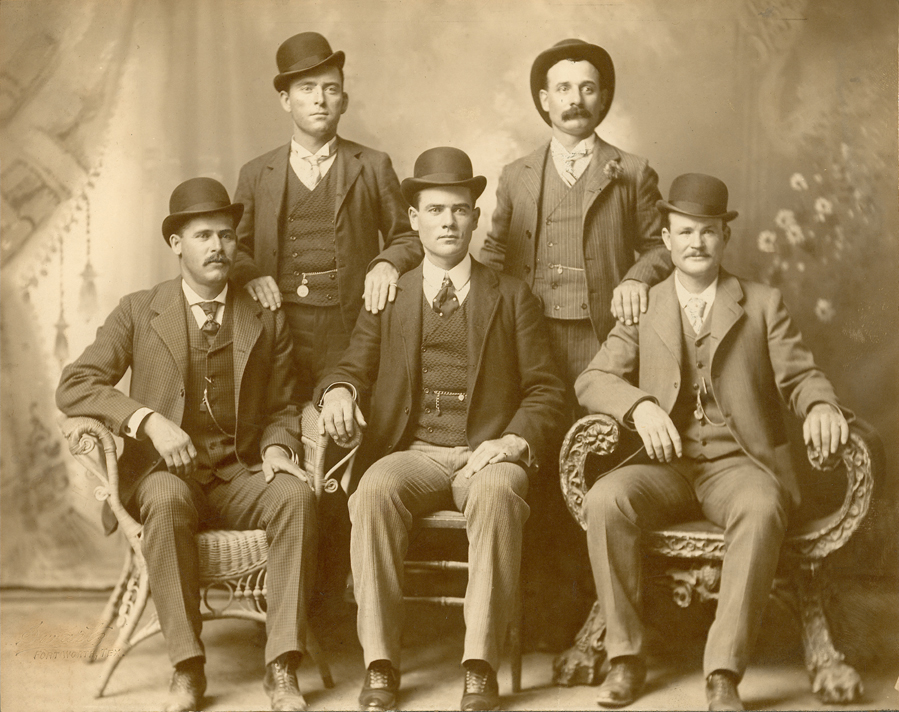
The Sundance Kid is seated first on the left (the "Fort Worth five" photo) Click a person for more information. Click elsewhere on the image for a larger image.

Harry Alonzo Longabaugh (May 24, 1867 – November 7, 1908), better known as the Sundance Kid, was an American cowboy, outlaw and member of Butch Cassidy's Wild Bunch in the American Old West. He likely met Butch Cassidy (real name Robert LeRoy Parker) during a hunting trip in 1883 or earlier. The gang performed the longest string of successful train and bank robberies in American history.

Longabaugh fled the United States along with his consort Etta Place and Butch Cassidy to escape the dogged pursuit of the Pinkerton Detective Agency. The trio fled first to Argentina and then to Bolivia, where most historians believe Parker (Cassidy) and Longabaugh were killed in a shootout in November 1908.

== Early life ==
Longabaugh was born in Mont Clare, Pennsylvania, in 1867 to Pennsylvania natives Josiah and Annie G. (née Place) Longabaugh, the youngest of five children. At age 15, he traveled west in a covered wagon with his cousin George to help settle George's homestead near Cortez, Colorado. While there, he found work as a wrangler at a neighboring ranch, and he learned to buy and breed horses. He left Cortez in 1886 and struck out on his own, drifting north and working on ranches. He found work on the N Bar N Ranch in Montana Territory, but the hard winter of 1886–1887 forced the ranch to lay off wranglers, including Longabaugh. Longabaugh drifted to the Black Hills before turning back to try to find work again at the N Bar N.

== Career ==
In 1887, while traveling across the Three V Ranch near Sundance, Wyoming, he stole a gun, horse, and saddle from a cowboy. He was captured by authorities in Miles City, Montana, and sentenced to 18 months in jail by Judge William L. Maginnis. He adopted the nickname "Sundance Kid" during this time in jail, having derived it from the Wyoming town of the same name and the fact that he left home at the age of 15.

After his release, Longabaugh headed further north into Canada into the southwestern part of the then North-West Territories, an area which in 1905 became the Province of Alberta, where he went back to working as a ranch hand, and worked at the Bar U Ranch in 1891, one of the largest commercial ranches of the time. He also became joint owner of a saloon in the Grand Central Hotel in Calgary, but after quarreling with his partner, which almost resulted in a gunfight, he headed south to Montana again. There, he took another job with the N Bar N and began rustling cattle and horses in Montana and Canada.

Longabaugh was suspected of taking part in a train robbery in 1892 and a bank robbery in 1897 with five other men. He became associated with a group known as the Wild Bunch, which included Robert Leroy Parker, better known as Butch Cassidy. Longabaugh was reportedly fast with a gun and was often referred to as a gunfighter. He became better known than Kid Curry, a member of his gang whose real name was Harvey Logan; Curry killed numerous men while with the gang. Longabaugh did participate in a shootout with lawmen who trailed a gang led by George Curry to the Hole-in-the-Wall hideout in Wyoming, and he was thought to have wounded two men in that shootout. Several people were killed by members of the gang, including five law enforcement officers killed by Logan. "Wanted dead or alive" posters were posted throughout the country, with rewards of as much as $30,000 for information leading to their capture or deaths.

Longabaugh and Logan used a log cabin at Old Trail Town in Cody, Wyoming, as a hide-out, as they planned to rob a bank in Red Lodge, Montana. They then began hiding out at Hole-in-the-Wall, located near Kaycee, Wyoming. From there, they could strike and retreat with little fear of capture, since it was situated on high ground with a view of the surrounding territory in all directions. Pinkerton detectives led by Charlie Siringo, however, hounded the gang for a few years.

== Escape to South America ==
Cassidy and Longabaugh fled to New York City, feeling continuous pressure from the numerous law enforcement agencies pursuing them and seeing their gang falling apart. They departed from there to Buenos Aires, Argentina, aboard the British steamer Herminius on February 20, 1901, along with Longabaugh's companion Etta Place. Cassidy posed as James Ryan, Place's fictitious brother. They settled in a four-room log cabin on a 15,000-acre (61 km^{2}) ranch that they purchased on the east bank of the Rio Blanco near Cholila, just east of the Andes in Chubut.

Bruce Chatwin's In Patagonia references a letter Butch wrote from Cholila to Elzy Lay's mother-in-law in Utah, dated August 10, 1902. The letter cites "our little family of 3" living in a 4-room house with 300 cattle, 1500 sheep, and 28 horses. Chatwin states the letter resides with the Utah State Historical Society.

=== 1905 ===
Two English-speaking bandits held up the Banco de Tarapacá y Argentino in Río Gallegos on February 14, 1905, 700 miles (1,100 km) south of Cholila near the Strait of Magellan, and the pair vanished north across the Patagonian grasslands. The pair might have been Cassidy and Longabaugh.

Fearing that law enforcement had located them, Cassidy and Longabaugh sold the Cholila ranch on May 1, 1905. The Pinkerton Agency had known their location for some time, but the snow and the hard winter of Patagonia had prevented their agent Frank Dimaio from making an arrest. Governor Julio Lezana issued an arrest warrant, but Sheriff Edward Humphreys, a Welsh-Argentine who was friendly with Cassidy and enamored of Place, tipped them off. The trio then fled north to San Carlos de Bariloche, where they embarked on the steamer Condor across Nahuel Huapí Lake and into Chile; they returned to Argentina by the end of the year.

A man going under the name Frank Boyd, who was in reality Sundance/Longabaugh, killed a police officer on August 21, 1905, in a shootout at the port town of Antofagasta, Chile. He was released on a bond (equivalent to US$50,000 in 2022) and then, assisted by the US vice-consul in Antofagasta, fled to Argentina and finally Bolivia. This was not known until 2022, when the old Antofagasta El Industrial newspaper was digitized. Cassidy, Longabaugh, Place, and an unknown male associate robbed the Banco de la Nación Argentina branch in Villa Mercedes, San Luis Province on December 19, 1905, which is 450 miles (720 km) west of Buenos Aires, taking 12,000 pesos. They fled across the Andes to reach the safety of Chile.

On June 30, 1906, Place decided that she had enough of life on the run, so Longabaugh took her back to San Francisco. Cassidy obtained honest work under the alias James "Santiago" Maxwell at the Concordia Tin Mine in the Santa Vera Cruz range of the central Bolivian Andes, where Longabaugh joined him upon his return. Their main duties included guarding the company payroll. The two traveled to Santa Cruz in late 1907, a frontier town in Bolivia's eastern savannah, still wanting to settle down as respectable ranchers.

== Death ==
A courier was carrying the payroll for the Aramayo Franke and Cia Silver Mine on November 3, 1908, near the small mining town of San Vicente in the Potosí Department in southern Bolivia, when he was attacked by two masked American bandits believed to be Cassidy and Longabaugh. Witnesses saw them three days later in San Vicente, where they lodged in a small boarding house owned by miner Bonifacio Casasola. Casasola became suspicious of them because they had a mule from the Aramayo Mine, identifiable from the company's brand. He notified a nearby telegraph officer, who notified the Abaroa cavalry regiment stationed nearby. The unit dispatched three soldiers under the command of Captain Justo Concha, and they notified the local authorities.

The soldiers, the police chief, the local mayor, and some of his officials all surrounded the lodging house on the evening of November 6, intending to arrest the Aramayo robbers. As they approached the house, the bandits opened fire, killing one of the soldiers and wounding another and starting a gunfight which lasted for several hours into the evening and the night. At around 2:00 am, during a lull in the fighting, the mayor heard a man scream three times inside the house, then two successive shots were fired from inside the house.

The authorities entered the house the next morning, where they found two bodies with numerous bullet wounds to the arms and legs. The man assumed to be Longabaugh had a bullet wound in the forehead, and the man thought to be Cassidy had a bullet hole in the temple. The local police report speculated that judging from the positions of the bodies, Cassidy had probably shot the fatally wounded Longabaugh to put him out of his misery, then killed himself with his final bullet. The Tupiza police identified the bandits as the men who robbed the Aramayo payroll transport, but the Bolivian authorities did not know their real names, nor could they positively identify them.

The two bodies were buried at the small San Vicente cemetery, near the grave of a German miner named Gustav Zimmer. American forensic anthropologist Clyde Snow and his researchers attempted to find the graves in 1991, but they did not find any remains with DNA matching the living relatives of Cassidy and Longabaugh. Snow's search formed the basis of the British documentary Wanted - Butch Cassidy and the Sundance Kid (Channel 4, April 22, 1993; later screened on Nova, October 12, 1993).

In 2017, a new search was launched for Cassidy's grave, which zeroed in on a mine outside Goodsprings, Nevada. The dig found human remains, but they did not match the DNA provided.

=== Rumors of survival ===
Some have claimed that one or both men survived and returned to the United States. One of these claims was that Longabaugh lived under the name of William Henry Long in the small town of Duchesne, Utah. Long died in 1936, and his remains were exhumed in December 2008 and subjected to DNA testing. Anthropologist John McCullough stated Long's remains did not match the DNA which they had obtained "from a distant relative of the Sundance Kid."

== In popular culture ==
- Arthur Kennedy portrayed the Sundance Kid in the 1947 film Cheyenne (later retitled The Wyoming Kid).
- Longabaugh was portrayed by Robert Ryan in the 1948 film Return of the Bad Men, although the film is inaccurate in a number of points, not least of which are the cold-blooded killings by the character and his death at the end of the movie.
- He was depicted as a character in the 1951 film The Texas Rangers played by Ian MacDonald. The fictional tale has real-life outlaws Sam Bass, John Wesley Hardin, Butch Cassidy and Dave Rudabaugh and him forming a gang, then squaring off against two convicts recruited by John B. Jones to bring them to justice.
- He was portrayed by Alan Hale, Jr. in the 1956 film The Three Outlaws, with Neville Brand as Butch Cassidy.
- Scott Brady played him in the 1956 film The Maverick Queen.
- Robert Redford played him in the 1969 film Butch Cassidy and the Sundance Kid. Redford named the Sundance Film Festival after the Sundance Kid.
- Elizabeth Montgomery played his fugitive girlfriend in the 1974 film Mrs. Sundance.
- William Katt portrayed the Sundance Kid and Tom Berenger played Butch in Butch and Sundance: The Early Days (1979).
- Padraic Delaney portrayed him in the 2011 film Blackthorn.
- He is an antagonist in the video game Call of Juarez: Gunslinger (2013).
- Butch Cassidy and Sundance Kid are supporting characters in the Drifters manga series by Kouta Hirano.

== See also ==
- List of fugitives from justice who disappeared

== Bibliography ==
- Clayton, John (2013). Stories from Montana's Enduring Frontier. Norman: University of Oklahoma Press. ISBN 978-162619016-0. Pages 42–47 tell the story of Kid Curry and the failed attempt at a bank robbery in Red Lodge.
- Ernst, Donna B.; Buck, Dan; Meadows, Anne (2012). The Sundance Kid The Life of Harry Alonzo Longabaugh. Norman: University of Oklahoma Press. ISBN 978-080618305-3.
