= Terrell County Airport =

Airport in Texas

Terrell County Airport Kaufman Municipal Airport
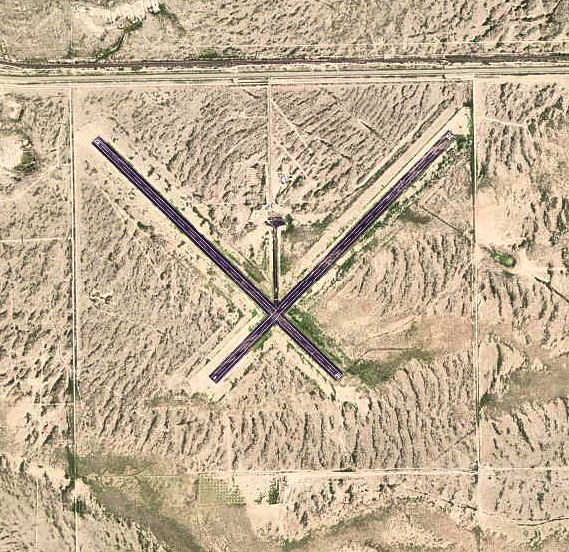
- USGS 2006 orthophoto
- IATA: none; ICAO: none; FAA LID: 6R6

Summary
- Airport type: Public
- Owner: Terrell County
- Serves: Sanderson and Dryden, Texas
- Elevation AMSL: 2,322 ft / 708 m
- Coordinates: 30°02′47″N 102°12′47″W

Map
- Location of airport in Texas

Runways
Direction	Length		Surface
Direction	ft	m	Surface
4/22	4,525	1,379	Asphalt
13/31	4,525	1,379	Asphalt

Statistics (2009)
- Aircraft operations: 300
- Source: Federal Aviation Administration

Terrell County Airport (FAA LID: 6R6) is a county-owned, public-use airport in Terrell County, Texas, United States. The airport is located five nautical miles (6 mi, 9 km) west of the central business district of Dryden, Texas, and about 14 miles southeast of Sanderson, Texas. It provides general aviation service.

== History ==
Established as Kaufman Municipal Airport. Taken over by United States Army Air Forces on November 12, 1942. Assigned to the USAAF Gulf Coast Training Center (later Central Flying Training Command) as a primary (level 1) pilot training airfield.

Flying training was performed with Fairchild PT-19s as the primary trainer. Also had several PT-17 Stearmans and a few P-40 Warhawks assigned. Inactivated September 30, 1945 with the drawdown of AAFTC's pilot training program and was declared surplus and turned over to the Army Corps of Engineers. Eventually discharged to the War Assets Administration (WAA) returned to civil control.

== Facilities and aircraft ==
Terrell County Airport covers an area of 644 acres (261 ha) at an elevation of 2,322 feet (708 m) above mean sea level. It has two runways, 4/22 and 13/31, each of which has an asphalt surface measuring 4,525 by 75 feet (1,379 x 23 m). For the 12-month period ending August 10, 2009, the airport had 300 general aviation aircraft operations, an average of 25 per month.

== See also ==
- Texas World War II Army Airfields
- List of airports in Texas
