= Train robbery =

Type of robbery involving the theft of money/valuables being carried aboard trains

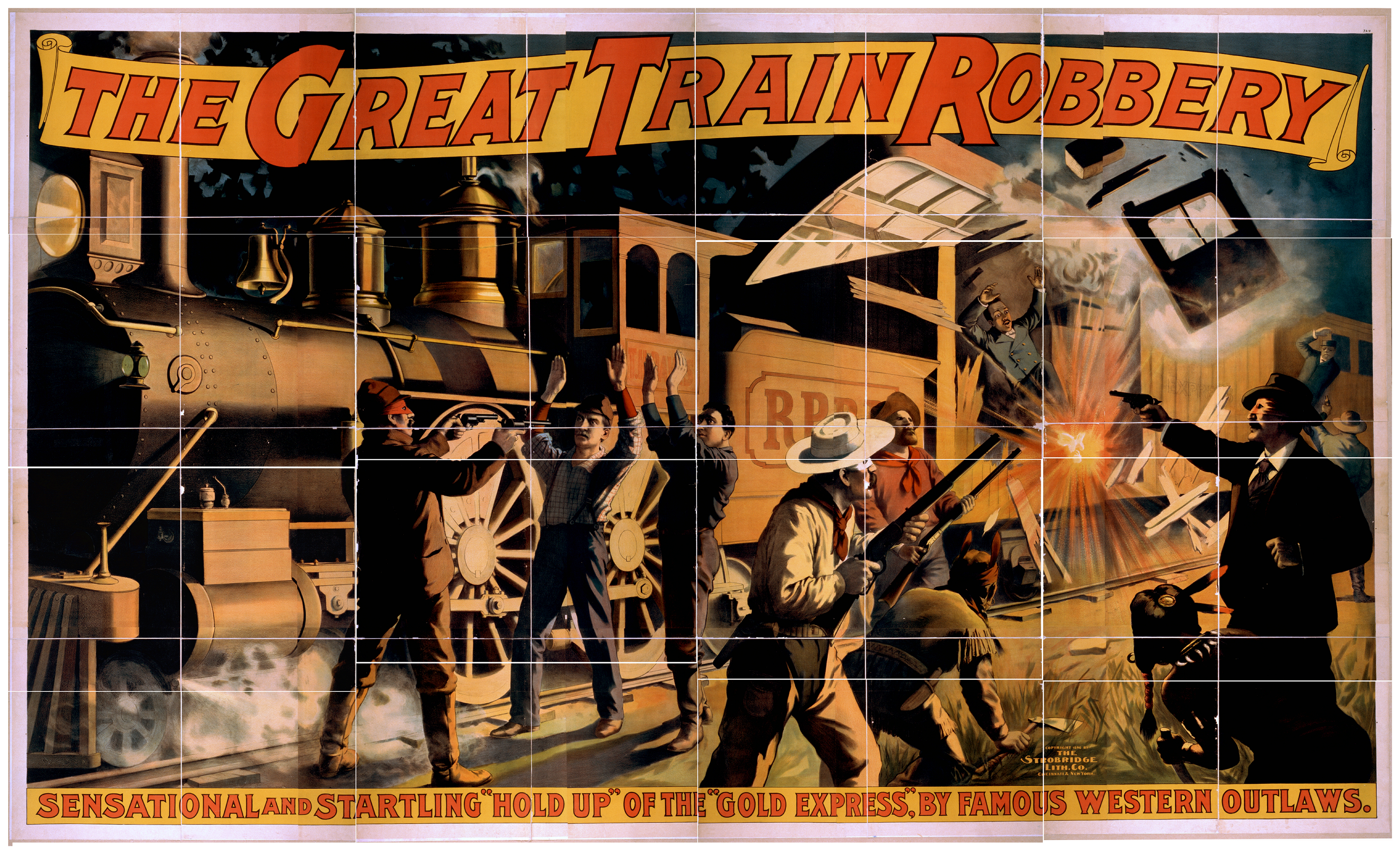
Advertisement for the 1896 play The Great Train Robbery, which inspired the 1903 film of the same name

Since the invention of locomotives in the early 19th century, trains have often been the target of robbery, in which the goal is to steal money or other valuables. Train robbery was especially common during the 19th century and is commonly associated with gangs of outlaws in the American Old West. It has continued into the 21st century, with criminals usually targeting freight trains carrying commercial cargo, or targeting passengers of public transportation for their valuables.

== History ==
=== Background ===
Prior to the development of railroads, stagecoach robbery was common. Especially in Europe and North America, stagecoaches and mail couriers were frequently targeted for their cargo. As coaches and horses were phased out in favor of trains, which could haul far more freight and passengers, so too did robbers adjust their targets.

=== Victorian England ===
Several major train robberies occurred in England in the mid-19th century. The Great Western Mail Robbery occurred in 1849. In two robberies on the Bristol and Exeter Railway, two passengers climbed from their carriage to the mail van and back. They were discovered at Bridgwater after the second robbery. One was Henry Poole, a former guard on the Great Western Railway, dismissed for misconduct (possibly on suspicion of another robbery); the other was Edward Nightingale, the son of George Nightingale, accused, but acquitted, of robbing the Dover mail coach in 1826, when two thieves had dressed in identical clothes to gain an alibi for the other. They were transported for 15 years. Henry was sent to Bermuda on the Sir Robert Seppings in December 1850 whilst Edward was transported to Fremantle on the Sea Park in January 1854.

On May 15, 1855, a train carrying gold departed London, England, for Boulogne, France, and was found upon arrival to be missing over £12,000 worth of gold and money. The incident became known as the Great Gold Robbery of 1855. Four men were arrested in 1856 for the crime.

=== American Old West ===
During the 19th and early 20th centuries, train robberies were frequent in the American Old West, where trains carrying valuable cargo, like payroll shipments, were a frequent target. These shipments would be guarded by an expressman whose duty was to protect the cargo of the "express car". Changing social and economic situations after the American Civil War led to the development of gangs and individuals who took up train robbery as a means of income. After the war, many soldiers were faced with little economic opportunity upon returning home, and train robbing required little specialized skill. Other robbers held the railroad companies in contempt, particularly those from the Midwest and West. The first post-Civil War robberies occurred in Indiana; Wells Fargo and American Express Company cars carrying money and other expensive materials were common targets.

Initially, trains were perceived to be largely impenetrable—especially when compared with the earlier stagecoach—and were often unguarded or only lightly guarded. Early trains passed through large stretches of rural landscape with little to no communication available, leaving them vulnerable to attack and hindering investigation and response by law enforcement. Early bandits were rarely caught. The sensationalization of these crimes in newspapers, dime novels, and Wild West shows added to the appeal for copycat and repeat crimes.

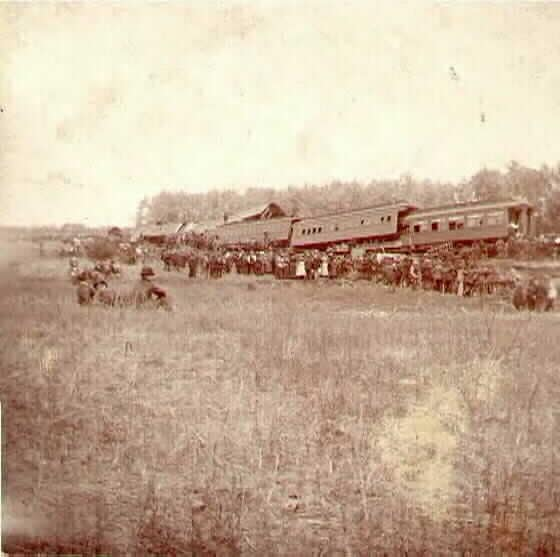
1873 train robbery by the James–Younger Gang near Adair, Iowa

Infamous train robbers from this era include Butch Cassidy, Bill Miner, and Jesse James. Jesse James is mistakenly thought to have completed the first successful train robbery in the American West when on July 21, 1873, the James–Younger Gang took US$3,000 from a Rock Island Railroad train after derailing it southwest of the town of Adair, Iowa. However, the first peacetime train robbery in the United States occurred on October 6, 1866, when robbers boarded an Ohio & Mississippi train shortly after it left Seymour, Indiana. They broke into one safe and tipped the other off the train before jumping off. The Pinkerton National Detective Agency later traced the crime to the Reno Gang. There was one earlier train robbery in May 1865, but because it was committed by armed guerrillas and occurred shortly after the end of the Civil War, it is not considered to be the first train robbery in the United States.

Train robberies peaked in the 1890s. Although they occurred in a wide variety of states, California, Missouri, Texas, and Oklahoma recorded the highest numbers. Notable robberies during this period include the Union Pacific Big Springs robbery in 1877, the Canyon Diablo Train Robbery in 1889, the Fairbank Train Robbery in 1900, and the Baxter's Curve Train Robbery in 1912.

Several factors contributed to the decline of train robberies around the turn of the 20th century and the decades following, although they did not stop entirely. Ruddell and Decker (2017) write, "train robberies were eliminated, in large part, due to making targets less attractive, increasing guardianship, and reducing offender motivation or in other words taking routine precaution". Law enforcement agencies and railroad companies, which once struggled to investigate crimes and arrest perpetrators, began creating or recruiting specialized task forces, such as the Pinkerton National Detective Agency. These bodies relentlessly pursued offenders, often for years, and imposed harsher sentences, which deterred further crime. Railroad companies spent more than they lost from the robberies on investigating and preventing thefts; "that for every dollar that was stolen in a train robbery, five dollars were spent on apprehending offenders". Trains also became faster and thus more difficult to board. Wireless communications spread and the population and law enforcement presence in once-sparse areas grew, making crime reporting and response much faster. The first train robbery to be reported by telephone occurred in 1907.

In 1923, what would later be dubbed the "Last Great Train Robbery", the DeAutremont Brothers targeted a Southern Pacific Railroad carrying mail. The would-be robbers attempted to breach the mail car using dynamite but accidentally used too much, causing a large explosion that destroyed the targeted goods; ultimately, four people died in the attack. Southern Pacific and the Pinkertons pursued the gang for years and distributed 3.5 million leaflets worldwide for information, eventually apprehending the members. Train robbery had become obsolete by the 1930s in the United States, and many criminals began instead targeting banks.

The outlaw culture in the American Old West became romanticized in Hollywood's Western films, such as The Great Train Robbery in 1903. Some serial train robbers, like William L. Carlisle, became folk heroes.

=== 20th century ===
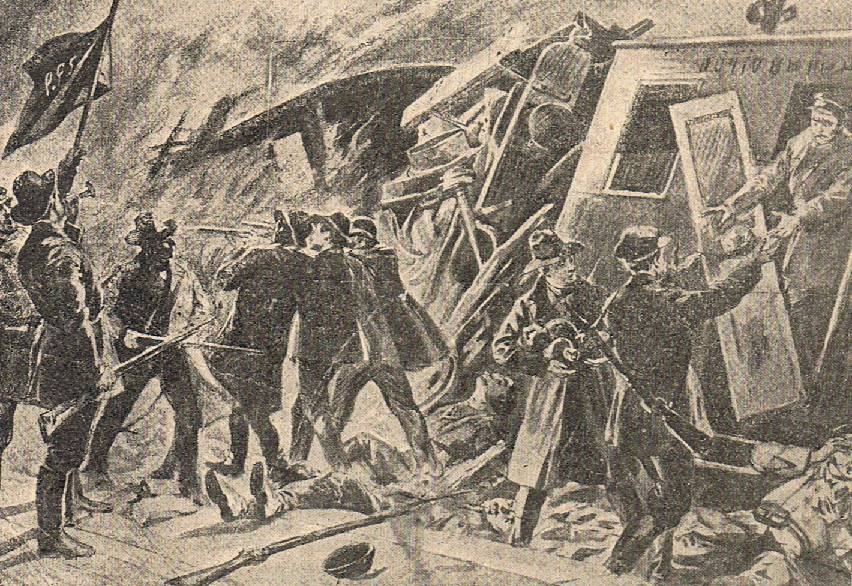
Depiction of the 1906 Rogów raid

Train robbery saw a marked decline as the 20th century progressed, although isolated incidents still occurred. Train robberies outside the United States were not as common before the mid-20th century; additionally, many robberies in Canada and Mexico during that time were perpetrated by American outlaws. Examples of 20th-century robberies outside of the US include the 1906 Rogów raid in Poland; the 1908 Bezdany raid in Lithuania; the 1923 Lincheng Outrage in China; the 1925 Kakori Train Robbery in India; and the 1976 Sallins Train robbery in Ireland.

Some countries were an exception to this rule. Egypt, then a British colony, struggled with an epidemic of train robberies during the late 19th and early 20th centuries. At the time, Egypt had high rates of poverty and social inequality, leading some citizens to turn to crime; some of these were underpaid train employees. An unorganized and ill-equipped police force hampered efforts to resolve cases; during this time, only about 17% of train robbers were apprehended. Some gangs were sheltered by local residents, and in turn gangs often used their profits to support their communities. Most cases occurred in Gharbia Governorate, Beheira Governorate, and Cairo and Giza. Egypt established its Railway Police force in 1893, and this, combined with new advances in security and forensic technology led to the gradual decrease of train robberies after 1904.

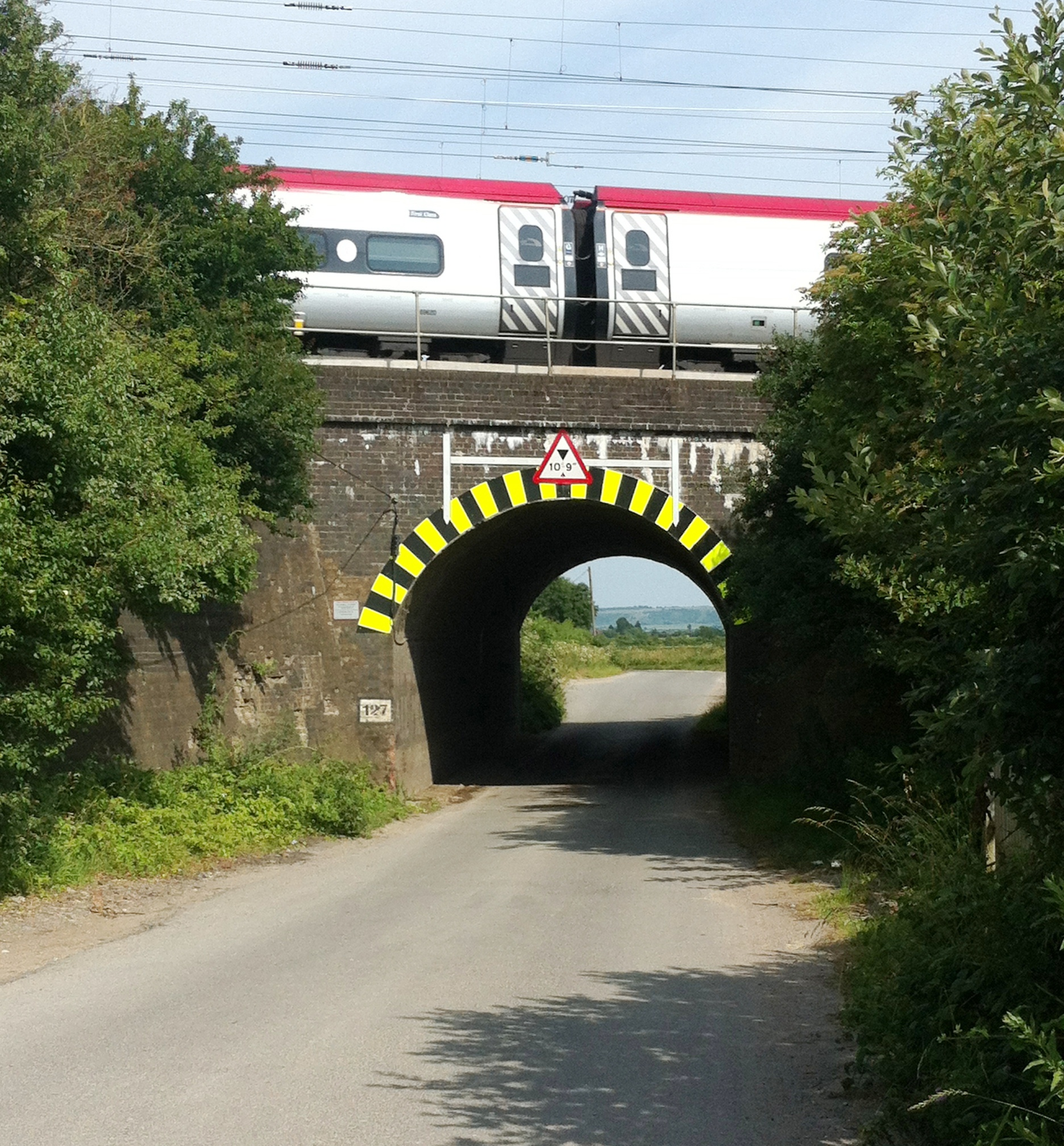
Train Robbers' Bridge in Buckinghamshire, England, site of the 1963 Great Train Robbery

The Great Train Robbery of 1963, the UK's most infamous occurrence, occurred in Buckinghamshire in 1963. On April 8, a group of robbers targeted a Post Office train en route from Glasgow to London and stole over £2.3 million in parcels. Apprehended members of the gang were sentenced to a collective total of 307 years imprisonment.

=== 21st century ===
Modern thieves often target train cars carrying cargo for large corporations, such as Walmart and Amazon; and are most interested in commercial goods, particularly electronics, or raw industrial materials like metals and textiles. In the United States, the Los Angeles Basin is the most common spot for freight to be stolen en route. Other hotspots include areas near large depots, like Detroit, Chicago, and Memphis.

In Mexico in 2011, train theft had increased by 120% from the previous year. Railroads in the south-central part of the country, such as Zacatecas, Veracruz, Puebla, and Guanajuato, are at the highest risk. The area around Acultzingo has the highest rate of train robberies, recording 521 in 2017–2018 alone.

A string of train robberies in India have targeted both cargo and passengers. On August 9, 2016, a group of robbers drilled a hole into the roof of a secure car aboard the Chennai–Salem Express and stole ₹57.8 million ($860,000; £570,000). The train had been transporting ₹342 crore from the Indian Overseas Bank to the Reserve Bank of India in Chennai. The Indian media dubbed it "the great train robbery". Eight arrests were made in 2018 in connection with the heist. Since 2023, several instances of armed dacoits boarding trains and robbing money, mobile phones, and valuables from passengers have been reported aboard Indian passenger trains. Multiple people have been injured in these attacks.

In 2021, train robberies in Los Angeles resulted in hundreds of discarded packages being strewn across the tracks. Trains were targeted on a section of tracks that they must slow down on and that are easy to access. Thieves used bolt cutters to cut open the locks on shipping containers and took the packages inside. The dropped packages were then picked over by thieves as well as passerby. Union Pacific estimated that losses were in the millions from all the stolen merchandise. By late 2021, an average of 90 containers were broken into daily. The Los Angeles Police Department assembled the Train Burglary Task Force in response to the robberies.

== Methods ==
The nature of train robbery varies. Cargo can be stolen from either a moving or stationary train in a variety of ways. Perpetrators of train robberies may work alone or in groups and might be committed by gangs or other organized crime. Sometimes, gangs might recruit local residents to partake in the robbery. Goods are often stolen from unattended train cars and in transitional areas like rail yards, parking lots, and warehouses. Thieves might sabotage the train itself and bypass security measures, either causing it to drop cargo, creating a distraction, or triggering an emergency stop, thereby creating an easier method of boarding the train. Sometimes, thieves will climb onto the train and pass or spill cargo onto the ground below, where packages can be retrieved.

However, as was much more common historically but is still done today, robbers sometimes use more violent means of breaching a train. Some will obstruct or sabotage the railroad itself in an attempt to derail a moving train. Some use dynamite to damage the rails or train itself to gain entry.

Before the invention of dynamite, it was almost impossible to break into safes. Criminals required the combination lock to open safes and often relied on the courier to provide it. Following its invention and widespread use, it became much easier to break into safes and rob trains. Criminals sometimes robbed passengers of the train's carriages at gunpoint, stealing their jewelry or currency.

Contrary to the method romanticized by Hollywood, outlaws in the American Old West were never known to jump from horseback onto a moving train. Usually, they would either board the train normally and wait for a good time to initiate the heist, or they would stop or derail the train and then begin the holdup.

== Effects ==
Train theft results in significant financial and commercial losses. As e-commerce has increased demand for large quantities of goods to be transported even longer distances, and as trains create fewer emissions than cargo trucks, the size of trains has also increased. Ferromex, Mexico's largest railroad company, reported that its carload volume had increased by 6.6% in 2011.

Financial losses to train robbery are difficult to calculate and vary from one crime to another. Robberies during the American Old West period resulted in an average loss of $9,980 per crime. In 2006, 11,711 train robberies in China were reported, with losses totalling ¥41.7 million ($6.8 million).

Sometimes, train drivers do not realize a car has been breached, and packages may continue to fall from the train, causing more loss as cargo is damaged by the fall or the train's wheels. Train derailment, caused either directly or indirectly, is also frequent. One such derailment in China caused a pileup in a railway tunnel that cost ¥3 million to clear, and millions more in indirect costs and loss of income. Additionally, packages or debris falling from a train can damage surrounding infrastructure. In one case in China, sheet metal being thrown from a train by robbers damaged nearby power lines, causing a blackout.

=== Humanitarian cost ===
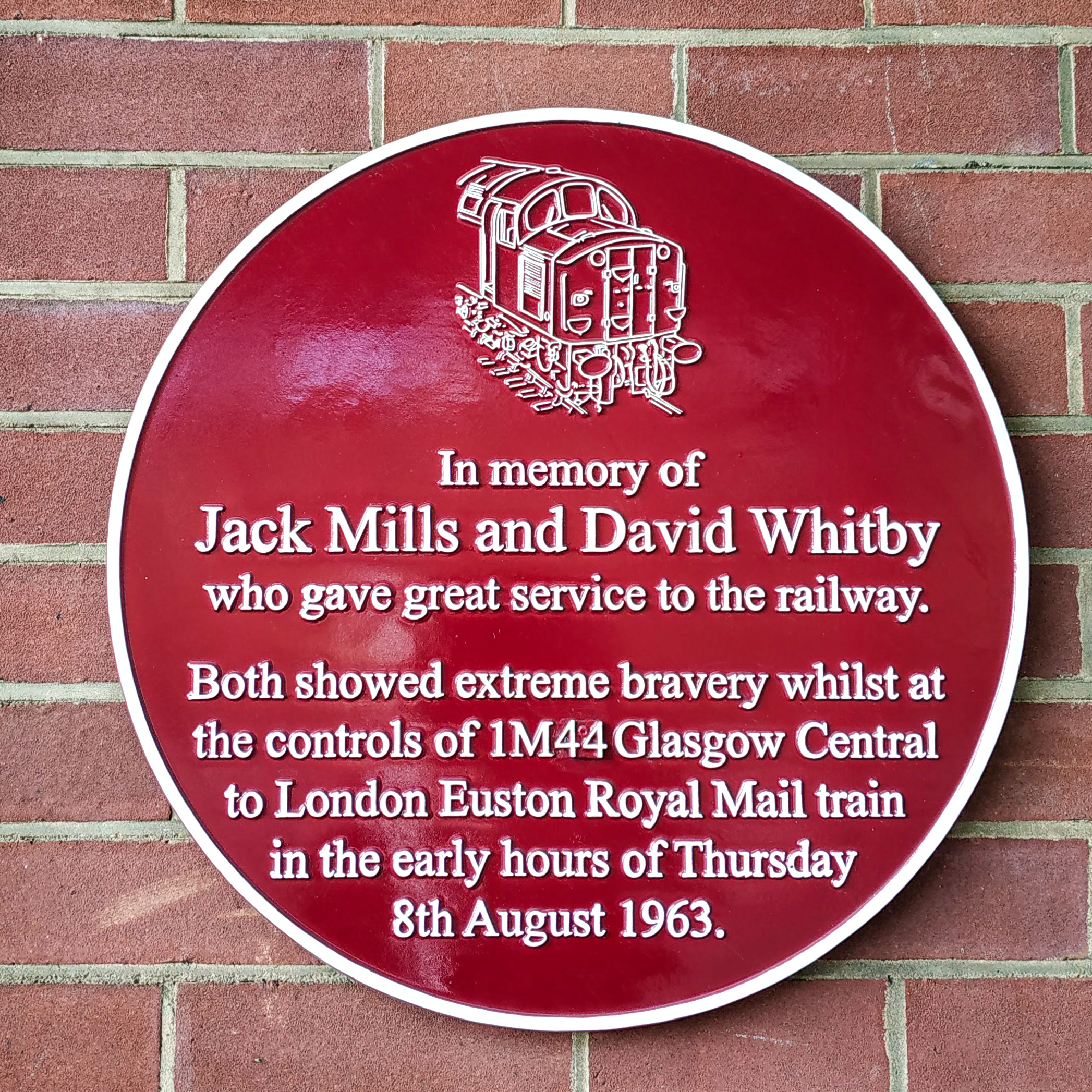
Memorial plaque for victims of the 1963 Great Train Robbery

Especially during the early decades of train robbery, violence against train staff and passengers, both directly and indirectly, was common. A 2017 review of 241 train robberies in the United States between 1866 and 1930 found that 91% were committed at gunpoint, 28% used dynamite, 29% resulted in shootings, 13.5% led to deaths, and 7.5% included derailments. One 1896 train derailment caused by robbers resulted in the deaths of about 27 passengers. Such violence only added to the high mortality rate of railroad employees, which during the first decades of operation averaged about 12,000 deaths annually. Additionally, perpetrator death was high; in almost 10% of cases, robbers died at the scene or during apprehension. Others were later executed, lynched, or died by suicide.

Today, violence against train employees is rare, and the majority of robberies on freight trains are nonviolent, as robbers prefer to avoid confrontation in most cases. However, passengers aboard carrier trains generally still fear being victimized. A 2024 study on Swedish rail safety reported 19% of surveyed passengers feared robbery while on or waiting for a train.

== Investigation and prevention ==
Railroad companies have long hired private security agencies to protect cargo during transport, or even establish their own internal police forces to patrol railroads. They may also hire private detectives to investigate and deter theft. In the early decades of train robbery, sheriffs would often recruit vigilante posses of citizens to apprehend perpetrators. Of the robberies during 1865–1930 studied by Ruddell and Decker, up to 90% of all train robbers were eventually caught. Those who survived the arrest—30% died during the confrontation—were sentenced to prison and sometimes faced capital punishment or were lynched.

In response to increased cargo train traffic, the Mexican federal government made train robbery a federal crime. China has its own railway police force, which in 2013 employed approximately 80,000 officers. Chinese cargo trains transporting electronics are usually accompanied by armed guards.

Several preventative measures are taken to deter and complicate robberies. These include increased security, target hardening, heavier punishments for convicted criminals, and collaboration with different law enforcement bodies. New technology, such as motion sensors, cameras, anti-theft doors, GPS, and smart seals are all used to deter theft.

== Notable train robbers and gangs ==
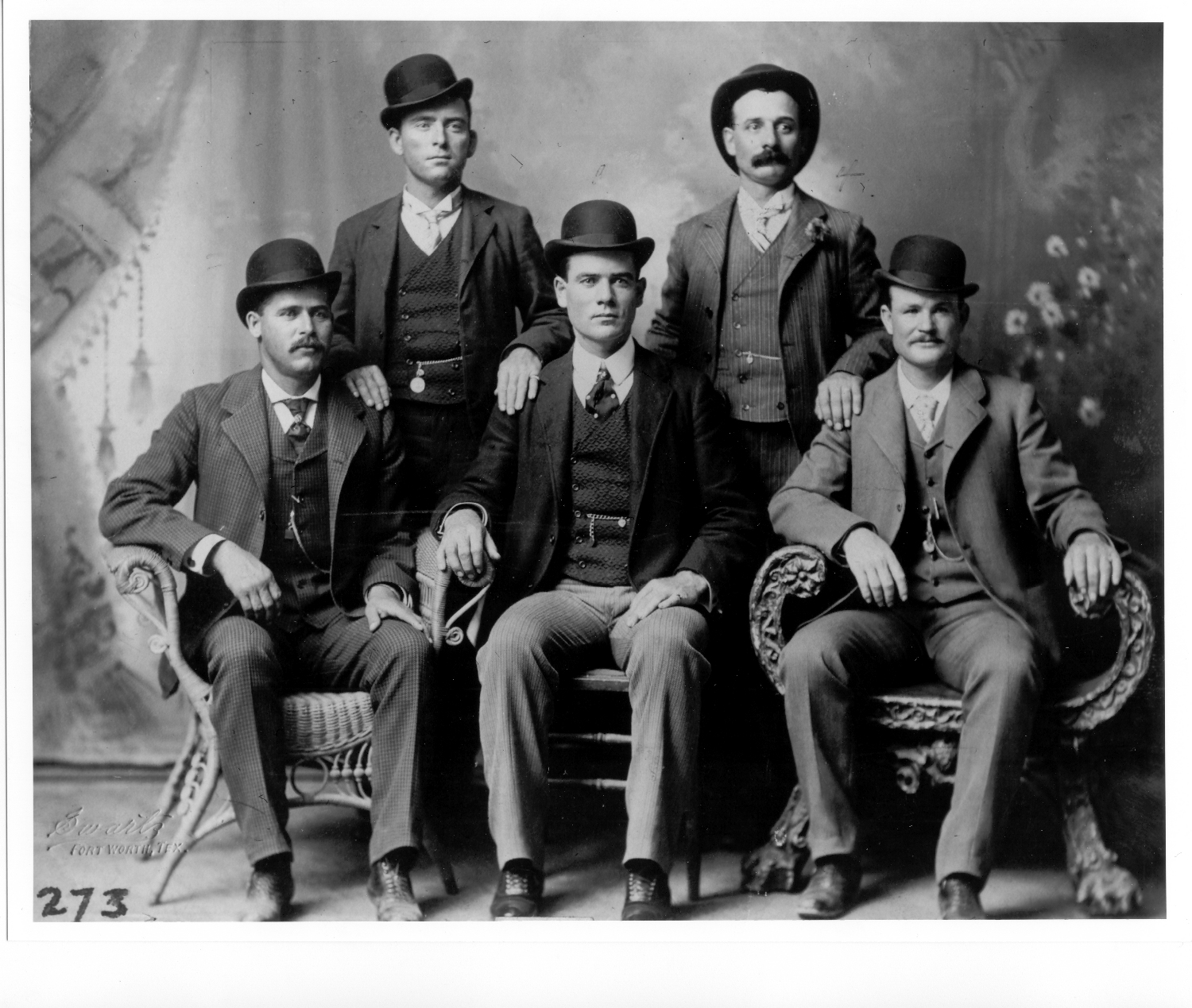
Butch Cassidy and members of the Wild Bunch, 1905

Some of the most notable train robbers and gangs are:

=== United Kingdom ===
- 1963 Great Train Robbery
  - Ronnie Biggs
  - Buster Edwards
  - Brian Field
  - Bruce Reynolds
  - Charlie Wilson

=== United States ===
- Rube Burrow
- William L. Carlisle
- Butch Cassidy's Wild Bunch
  - Laura Bullion
  - William Carver
  - Butch Cassidy
  - Flat-Nose Curry
  - Kid Curry
  - Ben Kilpatrick
  - Elzy Lay
  - Sundance Kid
- Bill Downing
- Dalton Gang
- James–Younger Gang
  - Frank James
  - Jesse James
  - Bob Younger
  - Cole Younger
  - Jim Younger
- Elmer McCurdy
- Bill Miner
- Tom Ketchum
- Reno Gang

=== Elsewhere ===
- Pancho Villa
- Sun Meiyao

== In fiction ==
=== In Westerns ===
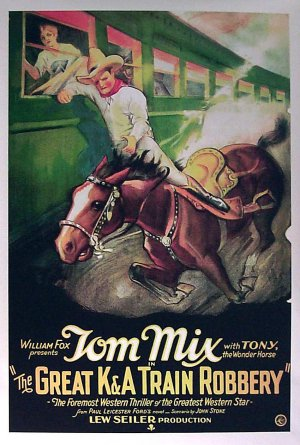
Poster for the 1926 film The Great K & A Train Robbery

Train robberies are a common depiction in Western films and media. The first movie to depict a train robbery was the 1903 silent film The Great Train Robbery, produced by Edison Studios. This 11-minute film depicts a gang of outlaws who rob a train, only to later be hunted down by vigilantes and killed in a shootout. The Great Train Robbery is credited with popularizing and setting a narrative standard for the enture Western film genre. Since then, dozens of Westerns have depicted train robberies, including:

- The Great K & A Train Robbery (1926)
- Jesse James (1939), based on the life of the titular character
- Whispering Smith (1948), starring Alan Ladd
- Rage at Dawn (1955), starring Randolph Scott and Forrest Tucker
- Man of the West (1958), starring Gary Cooper
- Butch Cassidy and the Sundance Kid (1969), starring Paul Newman and Robert Redford
- The Wild Bunch (1969), starring William Holden
- One More Train to Rob (1971), starring George Peppard
- The Train Robbers (1973), starring John Wayne
- The Missouri Breaks (1976), starring Jack Nicholson and Marlon Brando
- The Grey Fox (1982), based on the life of Bill Miner
- The Assassination of Jesse James by the Coward Robert Ford (2007), another biopic

In the 2018 video game Red Dead Redemption 2, train robberies are a source of income for the player. One of the game's cutscenes recreated the opening train robbery scene in The Assassination of Jesse James by the Coward Robert Ford shot-for-shot.

=== Other examples ===
Other notable train robberies in media include:

- O Assalto ao Trem Pagador (1962) a Brazilian film which portrays the 1960 Japeri Train Robbery
- The Taking of Pelham One Two Three, film (1974), starring Walter Matthau
  - The 2009 remake, starring Denzel Washington and John Travolta
- The First Great Train Robbery, film, (1979), starring Sean Connery
- The Chase, novel by Clive Cussler
- Tough Guys (1986) a comedy film about two elderly train robbers, starring Kirk Douglas and Burt Lancaster
- Buster (film)
- Money Train, film (1995), starring Woody Harrelson and Wesley Snipes
- "The Train Job", an episode of the TV series Firefly that involved a train robbery
- "Dead Freight", an episode of the TV series Breaking Bad in which methylamine is stolen from a train
- Solo: A Star Wars Story, film (2018), includes a train heist scene
- Marighella, Brazilian film by Wagner Moura, with Seu Jorge on the role of Marighella (2021)

== See also ==
- Bank robbery
- Carjacking
- Mail robbery
- Package pilferage
- Piracy
- Rail sabotage
- Steaming (crime)
