= Ben Kilpatrick =

American outlaw (1874–1912)

- Fort Worth, Texas, 1900
- Born: January 5, 1874; Coleman County, Texas, United States
- Died: March 12, 1912 (aged 38); Sanderson, Texas, United States
- Cause of death: Head trauma
- Other name: The Tall Texan
- Occupation: Cowboy
- Allegiance: Butch Cassidy's Wild Bunch
- Conviction: Robbery
- Penalty: 15 years

Ben Kilpatrick (January 5, 1874 – March 12, 1912) was an American outlaw during the closing years of the American Old West. He was a member of the Wild Bunch gang led by Butch Cassidy and Elzy Lay. He was arrested for robbery and served about 10 years of his 15-year sentence. Upon his release from prison, he returned to crime and was killed by a hostage during a train robbery.

== Early life ==
Kilpatrick was born in Coleman County, Texas, in 1874, the third of nine children of a Tennessee-born farmer, George Washington Kilpatrick (or "Killpatrick"), by his wife, Mary, a native of South Carolina, according to the 1880 Federal Census.

He worked as a cowboy for a time in Texas and became acquaintances with Tom and Sam Ketchum and Bill Carver.

== Outlaw life ==
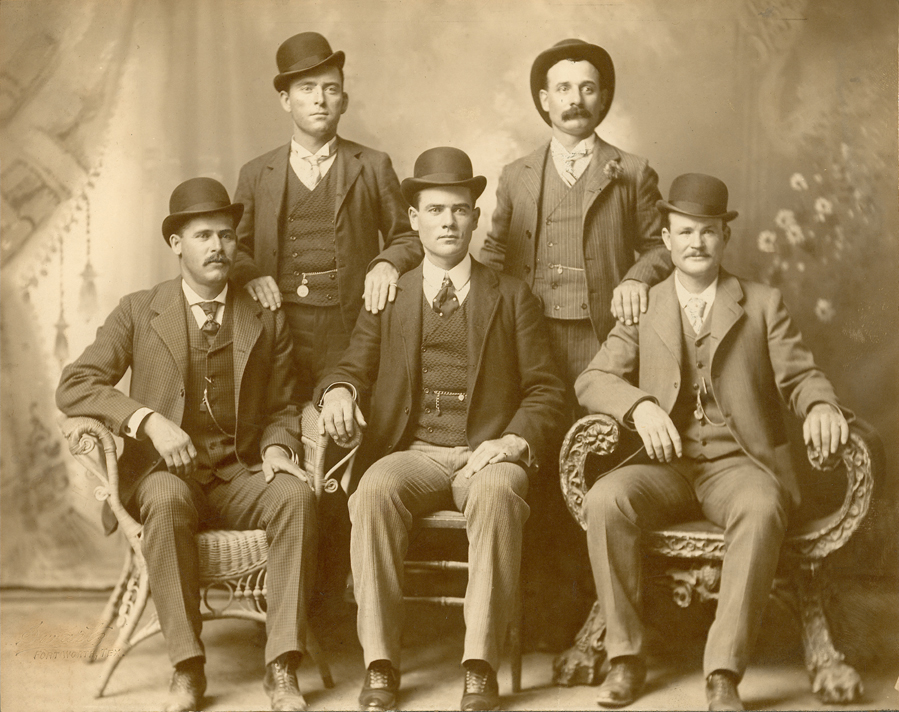
Kilpatrick is in the front row - centre; Fort Worth, Texas, 1900 Click a person for more information. Click elsewhere on the image for a larger image.

After Cassidy's release from prison, he and Lay organized the Wild Bunch gang, which began the most successful train-robbing career in history. Kilpatrick is thought to have been a friend of Lay, but he may have had minimal or no involvement with crimes involving Butch Cassidy or the Sundance Kid. Kilpatrick became involved with Kid Curry, but where or how they met is uncertain.

=== Escape ===
The gang would commit their robberies, split up, and then head in several different directions, meeting some time later in the Hole-in-the-Wall hideout in Wyoming.

Kilpatrick and Bullion made their way to Nashville, Tennessee, where they met with Kid Curry and his girlfriend Della Moore. Moore was arrested shortly thereafter for passing money traced back to one of the gang's robberies.

=== Arrest ===
Kilpatrick was captured on November 5, 1901, in St. Louis, Missouri, and received a 15-year sentence.

=== Death ===
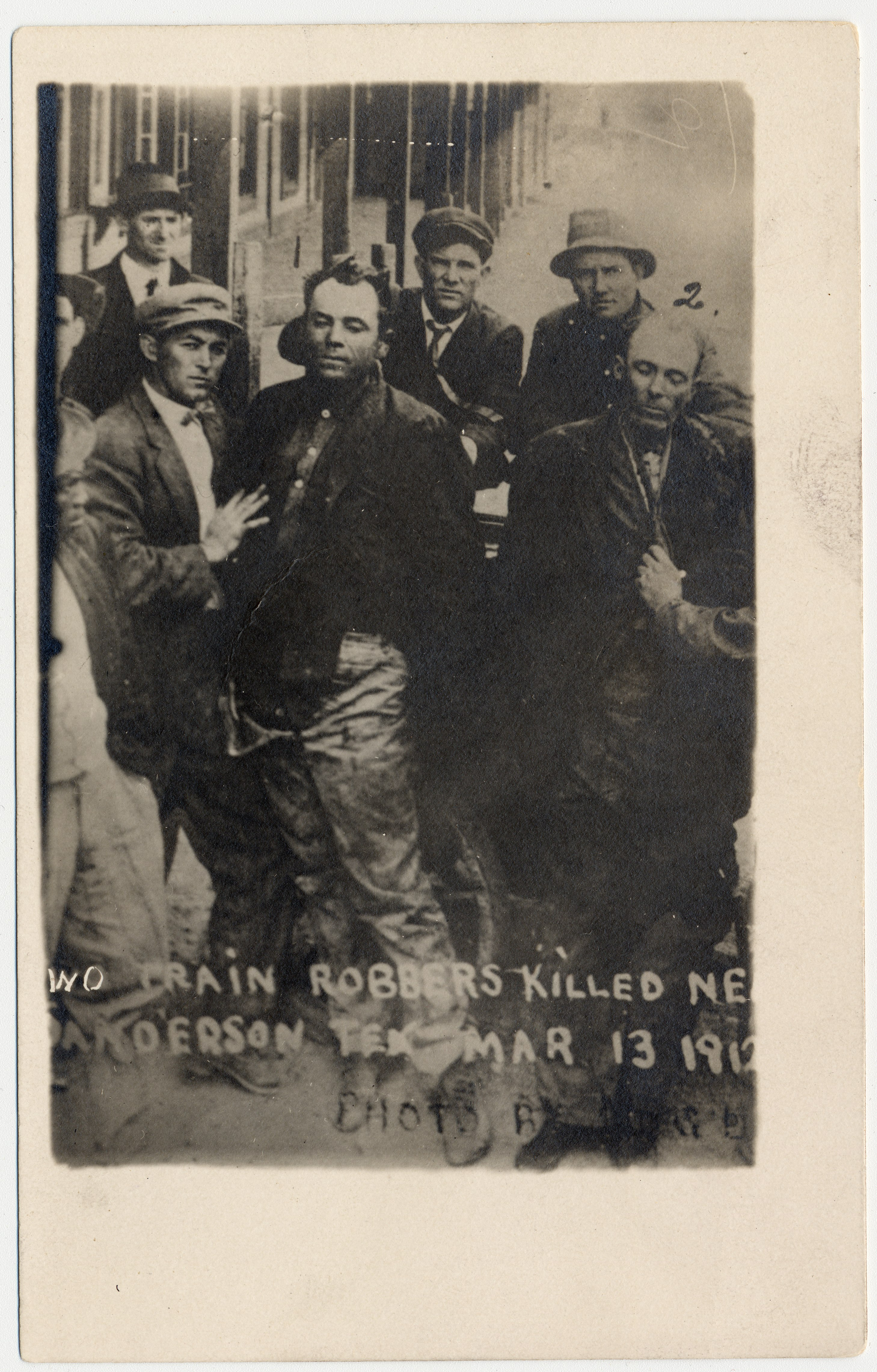
Photograph shows the bodies of Ben Kilpatrick and Ole Hobek being held up by others after being killed near Sanderson, Texas, March 13, 1912.

He was released from prison in June 1911. On March 12, 1912, Kilpatrick and outlaw Ole Hobek were killed while robbing a train near Sanderson, Texas. The duo is thought to have participated in several train robberies outside of Memphis in November 1911 and February 1912, as well as other small robberies in West Texas.

In March 1912, Kilpatrick boarded a Southern Pacific Express train near Sanderson, Texas, alongside a former inmate whom he had befriended. Attempting a robbery, Kilpatrick held up the express messenger, David Trousdale, in the Wells Fargo baggage and mail car. While Kilpatrick looted the safe and any other valuables he could find, Trousdale managed to hide an ice mallet underneath the back of his jacket. Trousdale then told Kilpatrick that there was a valuable package lying on the ground. Kilpatrick rested his rifle against his leg while he leaned over to pick up the package. As he did, Trousdale pulled the mallet from beneath his coat and struck Kilpatrick three times in the back of the neck and head. Kilpatrick died instantly of a broken neck and crushed skull. The beating with the mallet was so brutal that Kilpatrick's brains stained the walls of the car.

== See also ==
- Baxter's Curve Train Robbery
