= National Register of Historic Places listings in Terrell County, Texas =

Location of Terrell County in Texas

This is a list of the National Register of Historic Places listings in Terrell County, Texas.

This is intended to be a complete list of properties and districts listed on the National Register of Historic Places in Terrell County, Texas. There are four properties listed on the National Register in the county.

This National Park Service list is complete through NPS recent listings posted March 21, 2025.

== Current listings ==
	Name on the Register	Image	Date listed	Location	City or town	Description
1	Bullis' Camp Site	Bullis' Camp Site	August 2, 1978 (#78002985)	Address restricted	Dryden	
2	Geddis Canyon Rock Art Site	Geddis Canyon Rock Art Site	May 22, 1978 (#78002986)	Address restricted	Dryden	
3	Meyers Springs Pictograph Site	Meyers Springs Pictograph Site	September 14, 1972 (#72001373)	Address restricted	Dryden	
4	Wroe Ranch Shelter No. 1	Wroe Ranch Shelter No. 1	January 4, 1990 (#89002279)	Address restricted	Sheffield	

== See also ==
- National Register of Historic Places listings in Texas
- Recorded Texas Historic Landmarks in Terrell County
