= Baxter's Curve Train Robbery =

1912 robbery of a Southern Pacific freight train in Texas

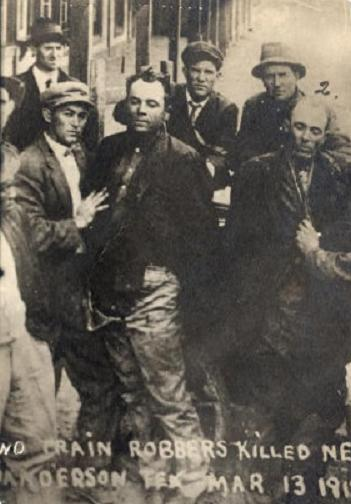
- The bodies of Ben Kilpatrick (left) and Ole Hobek in front of the Sanderson depot.
- Date: March 13, 1912
- Location: Near Sanderson, Texas, USA
- Also known as: Sanderson Train Robbery
- Participants: Ben Kilpatrick
- Deaths: 2

The Baxter's Curve Train Robbery, also known as the Sanderson Train Robbery, occurred in 1912 near the town of Sanderson, Texas. Ben Kilpatrick and his partner, Ole Hobek, attempted to rob a Southern Pacific express car, but they were stopped by one of their hostages, David A. Trousdale, who managed to kill both of the bandits.

== Background ==
Ben Kilpatrick, known as the "Tall Texan", was originally a member of Butch Cassidy's Wild Bunch, but he was caught after the 1901 Great Northern Robbery in Montana and sent to the federal prison in Atlanta, Georgia. Upon his release, exactly ten years after the Great Northern Robbery, Ben went straight back to a life of crime.

Old West historians have often written Ben Kilpatrick off as being entirely unable to commit a robbery without the help of Butch Cassidy or Kid Curry, but after his release from prison, a man named Ole Hobek and he executed a series of "spectacular" bank and train robberies within a short time. The robberies did not yield much gain, though, which necessitated further robberies.

Little is known about Hobek's life prior to his release from prison, where he is believed to have met Ben. However, anticipating Ben's release, he made an appearance in West Texas in the spring of 1911. Claiming to be a detective, he shared a hack with two men from San Angelo who were taking a trip to Sheffield. Once there, Hobek disappeared without paying his share of the bill. Investigators later determined that he contacted someone in Christoval, where some of Ben's relatives lived. Hobek was next seen in Memphis, Tennessee, where he was working for the L.B. Price Mercantile Company from July 1911 until February 5, 1912.

== The robbery ==
At about 12:05 am, March 13, 1912, Kilpatrick and Hobek boarded Southern Pacific's Train #9 in Dryden and rode it west towards Sanderson. Once they were out of town, the two robbers put on masks and made their way to the front of the train to take the engineer, D. E. Grosh, two of his crewmen, and the express messenger hostage. The robbers then ordered the engineer to stop the train at the first iron bridge west of Baxter's Curve, which was located roughly midway between Dryden and Sanderson and was where they had left their horses.

While Kilpatrick was holding the engineer at gunpoint, Hobek went to the express car with the express messenger, David A. Trousdale, and the two crewmen, to disconnect the following cars and commence the actual robbery. Along the way, Trousdale managed to arm himself with an ice mallet that was used for a shipment of frozen oysters. He concealed it upon his person until an opportune moment. A few minutes later, as Hobek was looking down to pick up a package, Trousdale struck him in the head with the mallet and killed him.

Trousdale then armed himself with Hobek's rifle and gave pistols to the two crewmen. They then turned out the lights and went to the back of the car to wait for Kilpatrick to show himself. According to Trousdale, they waited over an hour before he became impatient and decided to make his way to the express car. When he appeared in the window of the express car, Kilpatrick called out the name "Frank" a few times, but was then shot in the head by Trousdale without ever seeing him.

== Aftermath ==
With the robbery thwarted, the engineer restarted the engine, reconnected with the other half of the train, and then drove to Sanderson, where the sheriff of Terrell County was informed. The sheriff, David L. Anderson, who was notable for having been a member of Billy the Kid's gang, later captured a third accomplice in the robbery attempt; an 11-year-old boy who was recruited to hold the horses at Baxter's Curve. The bandits' horses were found to have been shod backwards, presumably so that when they made their escape their tracks would appear to be going the opposite way.

The train arrived in Sanderson about 5:00 am. The bodies of Kilpatrick and Hobek were immediately removed from the train and propped up in front of the depot for their now-famous photograph. After the photograph was taken, the bodies were wrapped in sheets and placed together in a large wooden coffin. Kilpatrick and Hobek were originally buried in an unmarked plot at the Cedar Grove Cemetery, but their grave has since been discovered and is now a popular tourist attraction.

David Trousdale was regarded as a hero, and as a reward, he was presented with $1,000 and an engraved gold watch from Wells Fargo & Company. He also received another $1,000 from the federal government, $500 from the Southern Pacific Railroad, and a gold watch fob inlaid with a diamond inside the star of Texas from grateful passengers. The engraving on the watch said "In recognition of the courage and fidelity displayed in an attempted train robbery near Dryden, Texas, March 13, 1912, Wells Fargo and Co." The fob said "Presented by passengers, west-bound Sunset Express, for bravery displayed March 13, 1912, near Dryden, Texas."

Although the Baxter's Curve Train Robbery is sometimes considered to be the last train robbery in Texas history, the Newton Gang robbed a Southern Pacific train near Uvalde in 1914.

== David A. Trousdale's account ==
The following was reported by David A. Trousdale to the police in Sanderson:

The first I knew of being held up was when the train came to a stop at Baxter's Curve. I did not go to the door, and did not know there was any trouble until the train porter [crewman], or the engineer called me and asked me to come to the door. I opened the door, and when I looked out, there was a man with a mask on, standing there pointing a rifle at me. The train porter told me that I was wanted out there; that there were robbers and I had better come out. I stood there for a few seconds and the robber told me to 'fall out' with my hands up. When I got out of the car, he walked up to me and searched me for arms; and then made me stand back with the train crew. He made the conductor and the train porter uncouple the baggage cars from the coaches and move away about 10 to 12 feet…. He searched the helper [crewman], and gave the conductor and porter instructions to go back and stay with the coaches; the mail clerk, the helper, and I to go on the engine. One of the robbers rode on one side of the engine in the gang way and one on the other side. They carried us something like a mile from the place they held us up. The robber going by the name of 'Partner' stayed with the engineer and fireman; and the other one going by the name of 'Frank' had the mail clerk, the helper, and myself line up by the side of the engine tank and marched us back to the baggage car and made us get up into the car, holding our hands up. He then carried us over to the safe and had me open it. I only had seve[n] money waybills in the safe, and out of the seven, I told h[i]m that there were only two of any value to him. I got him to take two packages one valued at $2.00 and the other $37.00. After he had looked over the car, he said he would go through and see what Uncle Sam had and he carried the three of us back to the mail car. He cut one mail pouch open and put all of the loose registers in it; and threw it out with four others, filled with registers; and told me that he would take me across the river (meaning the Rio Grande) with him. I thought if there was any chance for me to get the advantage on him, it would be by taking him back through my car where I could find some means of turning the table on him. We passed through the combination car and I opened two or three packages of express; and he took his knife and cut one telescope grip open. He took out a Mexican hat and said there was nothing in the baggage that he wanted. The robber, helper Reagan, and I went on into the through car. I told him that I was not getting fighting wages and did not care how much he took out. In this way I gained his confidence and he quit treating me as roughly as he had been. Before this, he would jab me with his rifle and command me around in a boisterous manner. When we passed by a stack of oysters, I had an empty packer standing in about the center of the car, and the robber and I had to pass between the oysters and the packer, and this crowded me close to the oysters; and as we passed, I picked up the ice-maul [mallet] which was lying on them. I placed it behind my overcoat so that he could not see it and got him away from the door and showed him a package which was going to Sanderson, and told him that the package was worth more than all he had gotten, I thought. He rested his rifle against his leg and started to pick up the package in his right hand. While he was in this position, I saw my chance, and so the first blow I struck him was at the base of the skull, adjoining his head from his neck. Then I struck him two more blows in the top of the head after he had fallen, and knocked his brains out the third blow. I took two .45 caliber Colt revolvers and a 401 Model Winchester off this man. I gave the mail clerk and the helper each a revolver and I kept the rifle. I sent the mail clerk and helper to the rear end of the car. I turned the lights out and then joined them and the only way we could see was from the lights in the combination car. I waited something like two hours for the second man to come back. He did not show up for sometime, and I fired a shot through the top of the car, and in a few minutes, he came to the door and called the name 'Frank' three times; and waited about five minutes, then I saw his head sticking out from behind a trunk forty feet from me. The first time he put his head out I did not get a chance to shoot, but the second time he was looking toward the rear of the car. I fired one shot – the bullet striking him about an inch and a half above the left eye, passing through his head and started going through the end of the car. After waiting about an hour, we pulled the air and the engineer backed the engine and baggage cars back to the coaches. The fireman came back to the coaches and called me. I told him to get the conductor and some of the passengers before I could open the car, that I had killed two men. In a few minutes he came back with the conductor, porter, and fifteen or twenty passengers. When I found that there was no one out there to harm me, I opened the door and admitted the train crew. After getting the train coupled up, we moved up to where the US mail had been unloaded and found everything there as it had been unloaded, and I got the two sealed packages that had been taken out of my safe. I transferred all of my money run to Helper Reagan and went as far as Sanderson and unloaded the dead bodies with the six guns taken from them. I then went before the Grand Jury and the coroner's court and was released. In conclusion, I will state that while on the way to Sanderson, I removed six sticks of dynamite and a box of dynamite caps and an 'Infernal Machine' from the man called 'Partner'. The man called 'Frank' had a pint of Nitro-Glycerine in his side pocket.

== See also ==
- List of Old West gunfights
