= Sanderson High School =

Sanderson High School may refer to:

- Jesse O. Sanderson High School
- Sanderson High School (Texas)
- Sanderson High School, East Kilbride
