= Hurricane Claudette (2003) =

Category 1 Atlantic hurricane

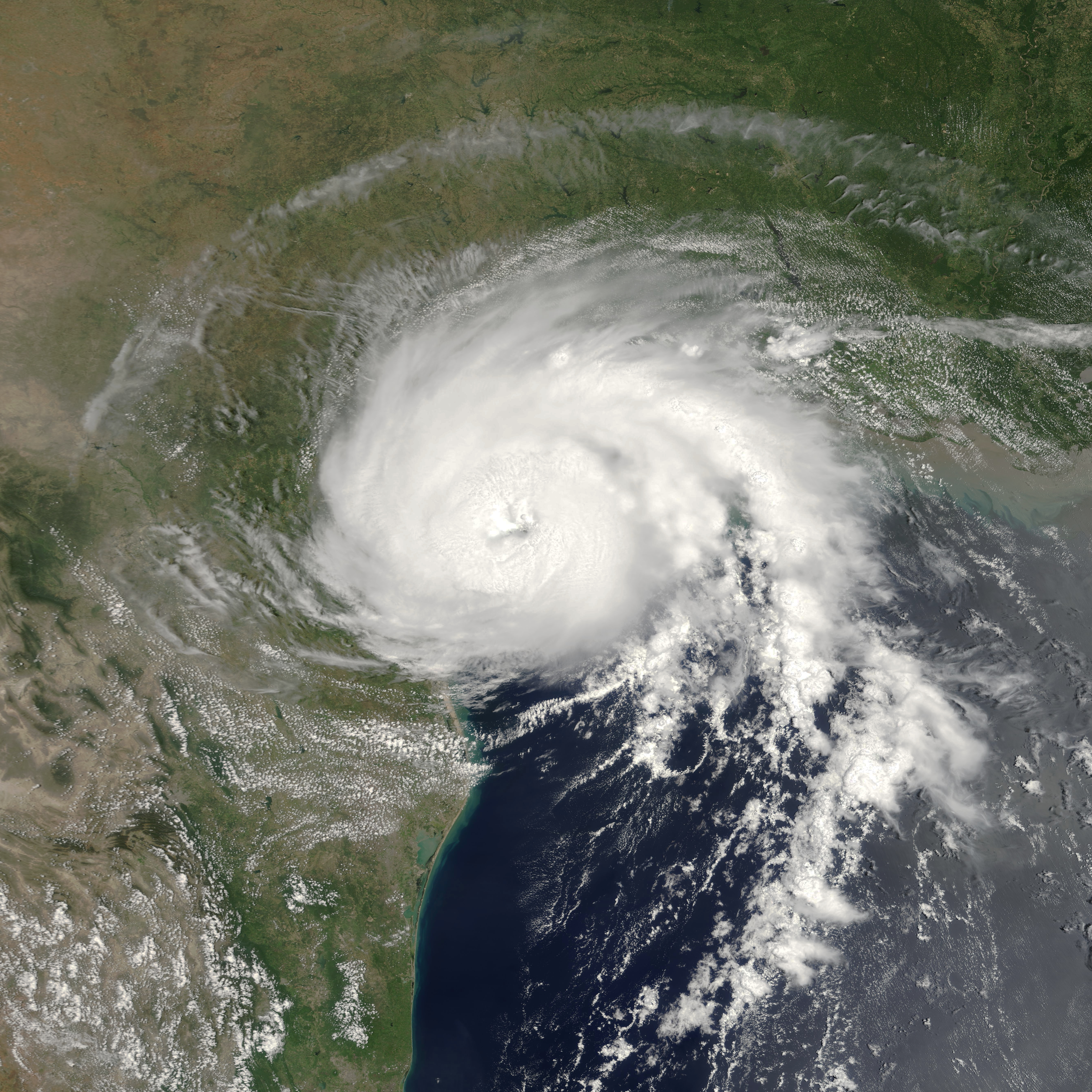
- Claudette shortly after landfall in Texas on July 15

Meteorological history
- Formed: July 8, 2003
- Dissipated: July 17, 2003

Category 1 hurricane
- 1-minute sustained (SSHWS/NWS)
- Highest winds: 90 mph (150 km/h)
- Lowest pressure: 979 mbar (hPa); 28.91 inHg

Overall effects
- Fatalities: 3
- Damage: $181 million (2003 USD)
- Areas affected: Windward Islands; Greater Antilles; Yucatan Peninsula; Northern Mexico; Southern United States
- IBTrACS
- Part of the 2003 Atlantic hurricane season

Hurricane Claudette was a moderately strong tropical cyclone that struck South Texas in July 2003. A fairly long-lived July Atlantic hurricane, Claudette was the fourth depression, third tropical storm, and first hurricane of the 2003 Atlantic hurricane season. Claudette began as a tropical wave in the eastern Caribbean. It moved quickly westward, brushing past the Yucatán Peninsula before moving northwestward through the Gulf of Mexico. Claudette remained a tropical storm until just before making landfall in Port O'Connor, Texas, when it quickly strengthened to a strong Category 1 hurricane on the Saffir-Simpson Hurricane Scale. Forecasting of its path and intensity was uncertain throughout its lifetime, resulting in widespread and often unnecessary preparations along its path.

Claudette was the first hurricane to make landfall in July in the United States since Hurricane Danny in the 1997 season. The hurricane caused two deaths and moderate damage in Texas, mostly from strong winds, as well as extensive beach erosion. Because of the damage, President George W. Bush declared portions of South Texas a Federal Disaster Area, allowing the affected citizens to apply for aid. Claudette also caused significant rainfall and minor damage in the Mexican state of Quintana Roo as a tropical storm, as well as minor damage on Saint Lucia before developing into a tropical cyclone.

== Meteorological history ==
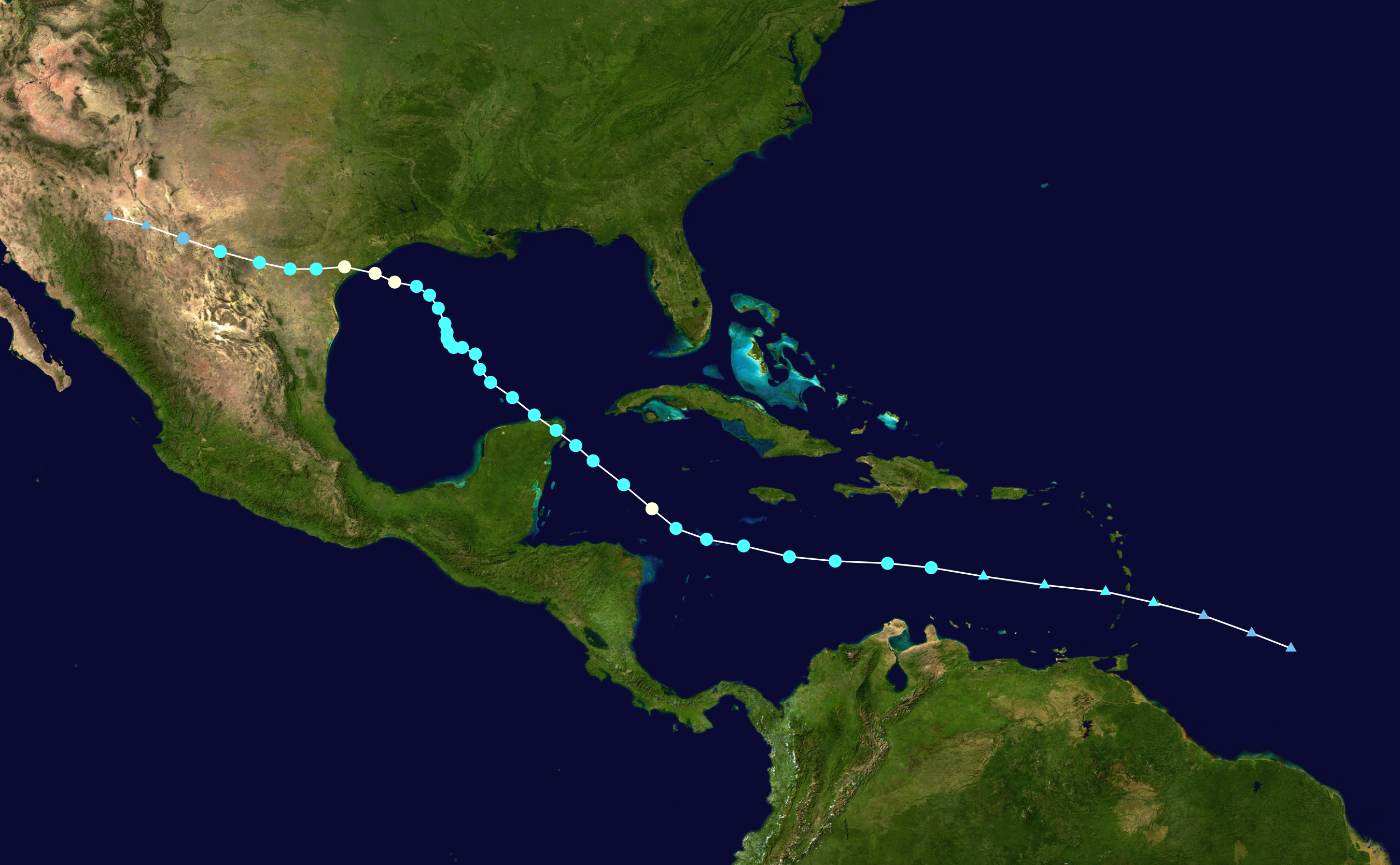
Map plotting the storm's track and intensity, according to the Saffir–Simpson scale Map key Saffir–Simpson scale Tropical depression (≤38 mph, ≤62 km/h) Tropical storm (39–73 mph, 63–118 km/h) Category 1 (74–95 mph, 119–153 km/h) Category 2 (96–110 mph, 154–177 km/h) Category 3 (111–129 mph, 178–208 km/h) Category 4 (130–156 mph, 209–251 km/h) Category 5 (≥157 mph, ≥252 km/h) Unknown Storm type Tropical cyclone Subtropical cyclone Extratropical cyclone, remnant low, tropical disturbance, or monsoon depression

A tropical wave moved off the west coast of Africa on July 1, and proceeded westward across the tropical Atlantic Ocean. On July 5, the NHC first mentioned the wave in its tropical weather outlook, although no significant development was anticipated. On the next day, the wave's associated convection, or thunderstorms, increased and began showing signs of organization. By 21:30 UTC on July 6, the NHC noted that "...[the] system could become a tropical cyclone at any time". Despite a well-organized appearance on satellite imagery, the system did not a have a surface circulation as the wave moved across the Lesser Antilles, as confirmed by the Hurricane Hunters. However, the wave produced winds of gale-force as it entered the eastern Caribbean Sea. Late on July 8, the Hurricane Hunters again entered the system, observing a surface circulation along with flight-level winds of 66 mph (105 km/h). On that basis, the NHC designated the system as Tropical Storm Claudette, estimating that the tropical cyclone formed around 18:00 UTC on July 8.

At the time of its formation, Claudette was located about 255 mi (405 km) south of the Dominican Republic. It was moving quickly westward, steered by a subtropical ridge to its north. With good outflow, or ventilation, around the circulation, Claudette encountered conditions favorable for strengthening. Early on July 9, the Hurricane Hunters observed flight-level winds of 98 mph (157 km/h). The NHC estimated Claudette produced sustained winds of at least 70 mph (110 km/h), and that the storm could have briefly become a hurricane. However, the thunderstorms weakened due to diminished outflow, caused by southwesterly wind shear. By early on July 10, the circulation was located on the southwest edge of the convection, although it was better organized than a day prior. Over a 12 hour period, Claudette rapidly intensified while the thunderstorms increased over the circulation, evolving into a large central dense overcast and an eyewall. Around 12:00 UTC on July 10, the Hurricane Hunters observed a 12 mi (19 km) eye, along with flight-level winds to 87 mph (141 km/h) and a minimum pressure of 988 mbar (29.2 inHg); on that basis, the NHC estimated that Claudette briefly attained hurricane status. At the time, the agency anticipated further strengthening as the storm approached Mexico's Yucatán Peninsula. However, the eyewall fell apart due to the continued wind shear and dry air, and Claudette weakened back into a tropical storm. The center became poorly defined, occasionally reforming within the thunderstorm bursts. Around 10:00 UTC on July 11, Claudette made landfall with winds of 60 mph (95 km/h) in eastern Mexico at Puerto Morelos, or 15 mi (25 km) southwest of Cancún.

By the time of its first landfall, Claudette was still influenced by the subtropical ridge to its north, although a developing trough over the southeastern United States weakened the ridge. This imparted a more northerly component to Claudette's track, to the northwest at first, bringing the storm into the southern Gulf of Mexico late on July 11. By that time, there were at least three small circulations rotating around the center of circulation, with the strongest thunderstorms to the east. The continued wind shear and moderately warm waters prevented restrengthening, and at times the circulation became exposed from the convection. Describing Claudette's lack of development over a 24 hour period, NHC forecaster Brian Jarvinen noted, "...as Yogi Berra said... it's deja vu all over again." A strengthening ridge turned Claudette more to the west on July 14, into an area of lighter wind shear. That day, it redeveloped a partial eyewall, although at times the circulation was also nearly exposed from the thunderstorms. Early on July 15 as the shear lessened, the outflow also expanded. At 06:00 UTC that day, Claudette re-intensified into a hurricane a short distance southeast of the Texas coastline. Although part of the eyewall was over land, the eye became better defined, and the hurricane continued strengthening until it reached the coast. At 15:30 UTC on July 15, Claudette made its final landfall at Matagorda Island, just east of Port O'Connor, Texas, with maximum sustained winds of 90 mph (150 km/h), or a Category 1 on the Saffir-Simpson scale. The NHC noted the possibility that it was slightly stronger as a minimal Category 2 hurricane. It was the first hurricane to hit Port O'Connor since Fern in 1971.

Once ashore, Claudette quickly weakened back to tropical storm status, and its eye became obscured. However, it maintained an organized structure for 24 hours after landfall, as the circulation crossed into the Mexican state of Coahuila. Claudette fell to tropical depression status by early on July 17, after the circulation reached the mountains of West Texas. Soon after, it degenerated into a remnant low as it crossed back into Mexico, entering the state of Chihuahua. Late on July 17, the surface circulation dissipated, although the mid and upper-level circulation continued across northwestern Mexico. The remnants of Claudette later crossed Southern California into the Pacific Ocean.

== Preparations ==
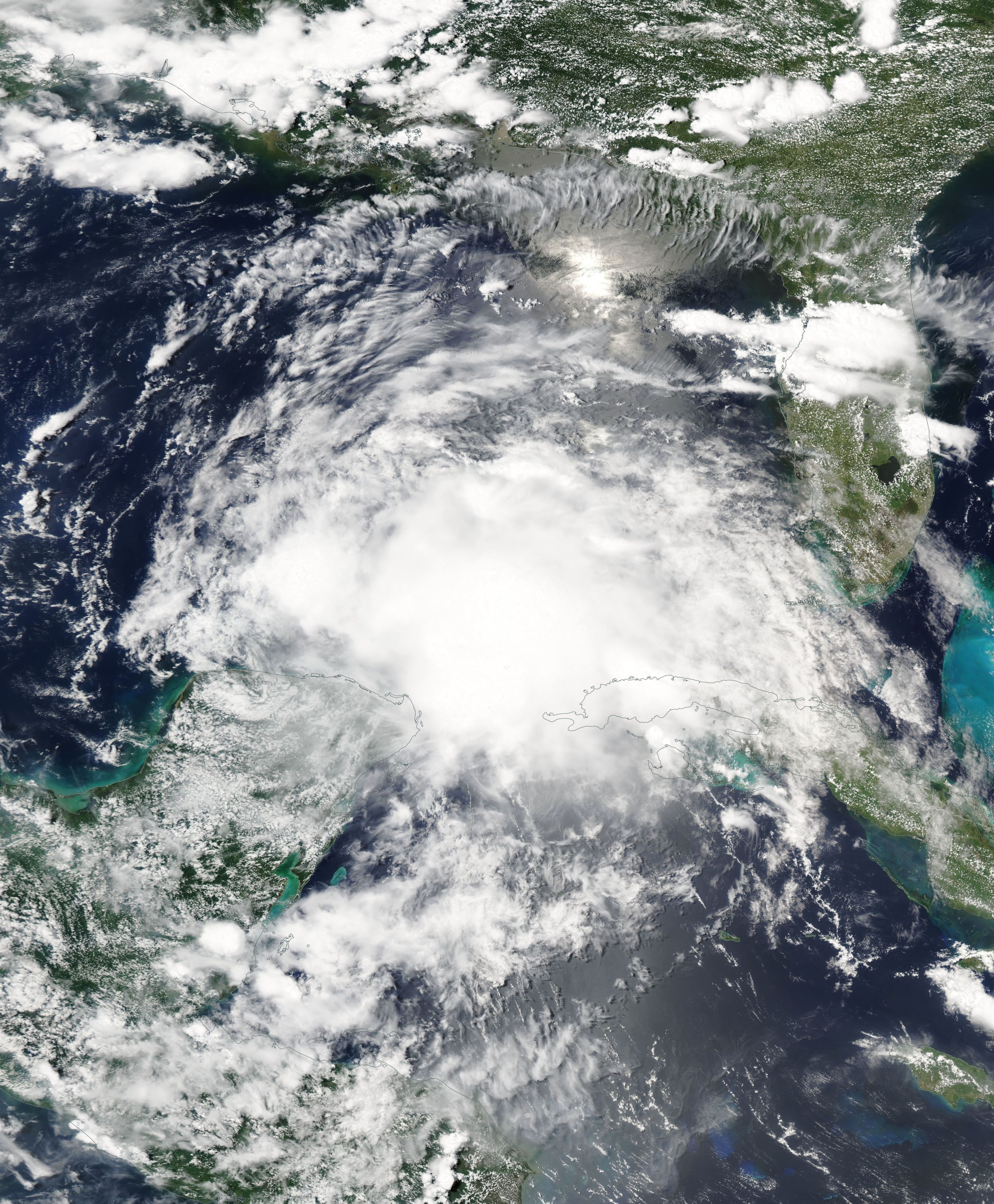
Tropical Storm Claudette hitting the Yucatán Peninsula on July 11

Mexican officials issued a tropical storm warning 37 hours prior to the storm's landfall between Chetumal and Cabo Catoche, Quintana Roo. The warning was upgraded to a hurricane warning about a day before landfall, but was downgraded when Claudette weakened just 13 hours prior to its landfall in the Yucatán Peninsula. The Mexican government declared a state of emergency in the projected path of the storm, and declared an evacuation order for 1,500 citizens in Quintana Roo. There, residents remained calm during the evacuation. Tourists left nightclubs for supermarkets to stock up on, among other items, beer, which was banned at midnight. Schools were set up as shelters, while police forced tourists to remain in their hotels.

The consistent variation in the path of Claudette caused uncertainty over the strength and location of its final landfall. On July 13, two days prior to Claudette's eventual landfall, the National Hurricane Center issued a hurricane watch between Brownsville and Port O'Connor, Texas. By the next day, a hurricane warning existed from Baffin Bay to High Island, Texas, while a tropical storm warning extended from High Island to Intracoastal City, Louisiana. When it became apparent that Louisiana would not be affected significantly by the storm, the state's tropical storm warnings were canceled. In Texas, Galveston County officials recommended evacuations for western Galveston Island and Jamaica Beach, 24 hours prior to Claudette's projected landfall. The Emergency Phone Notification System notified citizens in the evening to avoid evacuating during the night. Many citizens heeded the evacuation suggestion, some of whom remembered the flooding from Tropical Storm Frances five years before. Residents along and inland of the central Texas coast were caught off guard both by its intensity and its time of arrival. The hurricane was projected to make landfall in the evening hours of July 15, but instead came ashore before noon.

The threat of Claudette prompted various oil and natural gas companies to shut down 305 platforms or rigs, while evacuating thousands of workers. The lack of production equated to 18.1% of American gulf natural gas production, as well as 20.8% of the country's gulf oil production.

== Impact ==
=== Caribbean and Mexico ===
The precursor to Claudette produced gale-force winds on Saint Lucia. Damage on the island amounted to $1.1 million (2003 USD, 1.93 million 2026 USD).

In the Dominican Republic, the outer bands of the storm caused moderate rainfall of up to 3 inches (76 mm) in Santo Domingo. Winds gusted up to 45 mph (72 km/h), knocking down trees, sign posts, and iron roofs. Also, flooding in metropolitan areas blocked traffic for cars and pedestrians. Banana and other fruit plantations in the southwestern portion of the country experienced severe damage.

On Jamaica, Claudette produced wind gusts of 45 mph (72 km/h) in Montego Bay. The winds knocked down trees into power lines, causing scattered power outages. The storm also dropped heavy rainfall, but not enough to cause flooding. Many fishermen moved their boats from the water to safety, while a cruise line diverted three ships away from Claudette's path. The storm also delayed a dancing competition for a week. In the Cayman Islands, rainfall ranged from 1 to 3 inches (25 to 76 mm). Along the southern coast of Jamaica and the Cayman Islands, Claudette produced high waves. The outer rainbands of Claudette dropped heavy rainfall in eastern Cuba. Campechuela in Granma Province reached 12.34 in (313.5 mm). Wind gusts reached 48 miles per hour (77 km/h) at Cape Cruz.

While crossing Mexico's Yucatán Peninsula, Claudette produced light rainfall, reaching 3.22 inches (82 mm) in Cancún. This resulted in flooding in a few streets. Claudette also sank a few boats in the area. The storm's passage also caused the Cancún International Airport to close for several hours.

Toward the end of its duration, Claudette entered northeastern Mexico as a tropical storm. In Coahuila, rainfall reached 2.15 inches (54.5 mm) on July 16 in El Centenario. The rains wrecked 15 homes in Ciudad Acuña while also knocking out power; 18 of the affected residents moved to a shelter, while the remaining families stayed in their damaged homes.

=== United States ===
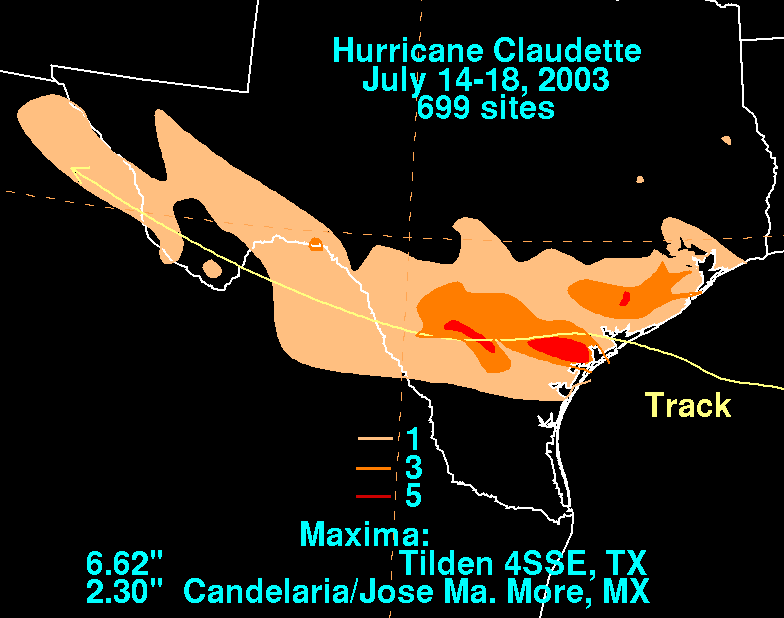
Rainfall totals from Claudette

While Claudette was over the Gulf of Mexico, it produced rip currents that killed a 70 year-old man in Navarre Beach, Florida. Two people died in Texas due to fallen trees. During the height of the storm in Jourdanton in Atascosa County, a tree fell over and killed a 13 year-old boy. The other fatality occurred after the storm passed, when a property owner was hit by a falling tree limb while surveying her property. Throughout the United States, damage totaled $180 million, mostly in Texas.

Upon making landfall on the central Texas coast, Claudette produced a variety of damaging effects. A station on Matagorda Island recorded sustained winds of 75 mph (121 km/h), while several other coastal locations reported hurricane-force winds gusts. At the South Texas Nuclear Generating Station in Bay City, wind gusts reached 86 mph (138 km/h), while Port O'Connor recorded wind gusts of 89 mph (143 km/h). There was an unofficial wind gust of 100 mph (160 km/h) at Point Comfort. Claudette's wind field extended into Louisiana, with a 43 mph (68 km/h) wind gust recorded in Cameron. High tides and winds caused severe beach erosion from High Island to Freeport. In Galveston, the storm surge reached a maximum height of 5.3 feet (1.6 m). Large geotextiles-tubes reduced the erosion on Galveston Island and the Bolivar Peninsula. Freeport reported a "storm tide"—the overall rise of water over the mean low tide—of 9.15 feet (2.79 m). Claudette produced moderate rainfall across southern Texas, peaking at 6.5 inches (170 mm) in Tilden. The rains led to river flooding across southern Texas. In Bluntzer in Nueces County, the Nueces River crested at 24.29 ft (7.40 m), or 6.29 ft (1.92 m) above flood stage. At Sabine Pass near the Texas/Louisiana border, a shrimp boat sank, and the crew of two were rescued by a Coast Guard helicopter. The Coast Guard also helped rescue at least 10 swimmers at South Padre Island.

The outer rainbands of Claudette spawned two tornadoes in Texas. The first, rated F0 on the Fujita scale, touched down briefly near Port Lavaca around 16:45 UTC on July 15. It damaged a few homes. The other was an F1 that hit Palacios at 20:30 UTC on July 15, which was on the ground for 0.4 mi (0.64 km). The tornado hit a campsight, damaging a few buildings. Damage reached $150,000 from the tornado.

Across coastal areas of Texas, Claudette destroyed 191 homes, mostly near the coast. At Port Lavaca near where the storm moved ashore, the storm damaged roofs and overturned mobile homes. The hurricane damaged more than 21,000 houses statewide, mostly around Victoria, including 600 severely damaged. Wind gusts reached 83 mph (134 km/h) in Victoria County, despite being located inland. In addition, the winds damaged 1,407 homes, with 144 of them being severely damaged. The wind also affected 147 businesses, of which 64 were either destroyed or severely damaged. Strong winds downed numerous power lines, leaving around 74,000 residents without power in the immediate aftermath. In Atascosa County, the strong winds blew over at least five tractor-trailors along I-37. Also in the county, the winds damaged the roofs of six houses, and about 100 homes lost power. High tides also inundated roads along the western shore of Galveston Bay. During the hurricane's approach, Matagorda Bay lost water, resulting in minimal tidal flooding there.

Claudette maintained its intensity as it entered west Texas, and was the first tropical storm to affect the region since Celia in 1970. In Crystal City in Zavala County, strong winds knocked down trees and damaged roofs. A weather station at the Terrell County Airport recorded sustained winds of 44 mph (70 km/h), despite being 350 mi (570 km) inland. The station also recorded gusts to 58 mph (93 km/h). Rainfall in the region reached 2.0 in (51 mm). The quick movement of Claudette limited floods to isolated flash flooding. In Big Bend National Park, a portion of U.S. Route 385 was closed for about 90 minutes. Floods also closed two farm-to-market roads. In Mentone in Loving County, a thunderstorm damaged a mobile home and a power pole.

The remnants of Claudette produced scattered thunderstorms as far west as California, a few of which generated small forest fires.

== Aftermath ==
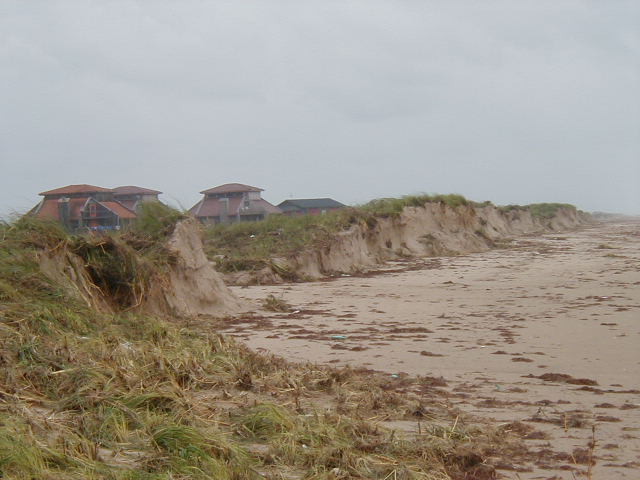
Beach erosion caused by Claudette

On July 17, President George W. Bush declared 18 south Texas counties as a federal disaster area. Within 2 months of the storm, over 15,000 citizens registered for assistance. The government approved $34.8 million (2003 USD) in aid, of which nearly half went to basic house repairs. The Federal Emergency Management Agency (FEMA) provided 75% of the $1.35 million (2003 USD) debris removal cost, with the other 25% being covered through local agencies. FEMA also provided $1.26 million (2003 USD) to repair geo-tubes on the Bolivar Peninsula in Galveston County. The geo-tubes, which protect buildings along coastal areas, were severely damaged by the hurricane. In Galveston, storm debris clogged drains after the storm. The city provided additional trash cans while also removing vegetation under 5 ft (1.5 m) in length.

== See also ==
- Tropical cyclones in 2003
- Weather of 2003
- Other storms with the same name
- List of Texas hurricanes (1980–present)
- List of Category 1 Atlantic hurricanes
- Hurricane Bret (1999) – A Category 4 hurricane that affected South Texas
- Hurricane Hanna (2020) – A Category 1 hurricane that also affected South Texas
