= Terrell County News-Leader =

The Terrell County News-Leader was a newspaper headquartered in Sanderson, Texas. The newspaper closed in July 2013.

Christine Hinkle owned and operated the newspaper for a five-year period. She said that her husband used to be involved with the newspaper; he sold advertisements, did typing, and drove to a printer in McCamey. According to Hinkle, her husband was eventually "burned out" by his work. Hinkle sold the newspaper to Jim Street in 2002. Street said that "I never took any money out of it. My little portfolio kept getting littler and littler because I had to keep chipping in. Overall, I think I lost about $25,000, something like that." The newspaper closed in July 2013. According to Street, at the time the circulation was about 500. By November 2013 the Terrell County Sun was established to replace the News-Leader.
