= Sanderson High School (Texas) =

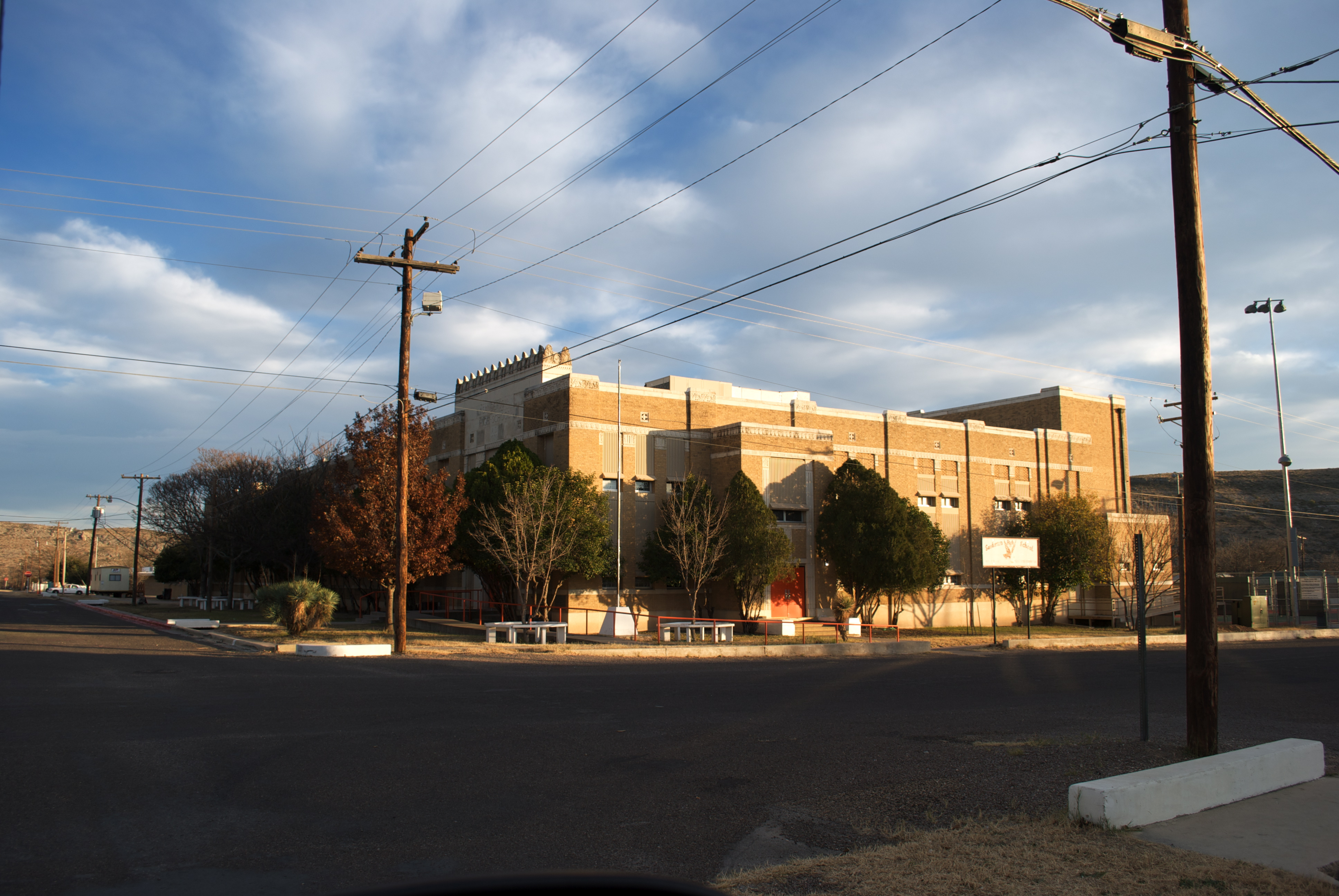

Location
- 310 2nd Street; Sanderson, Texas 79848-0101; United States; 30.142708°N 102.395520°W

Information
- School type: Public High School
- School district: Terrell County Independent School District
- Principal: Gary Hamilton
- Grades: PK-12
- Enrollment: 117 (2023-2024)
- Colors: Black & Orange
- Athletics conference: UIL Class A
- Mascot: Eagle
- Website: Sanderson High School

Sanderson High School is a public high school located in Sanderson, Texas (USA). It is part of the Terrell County Independent School District which serves all students in Terrell County and classified as a 1A school by the UIL. In 2015, the school was rated "Met Standard" by the Texas Education Agency.

== Athletics ==
The Sanderson Eagles compete in the following sports: -

- Basketball
- Cross Country
- 6-Man Football
- Tennis
- Track and Field

=== State Finalists ===
- Football
  - 2002(6M)
