= Alexander W. Terrell =

American politician (1827–1912)

Alexander William Terrell
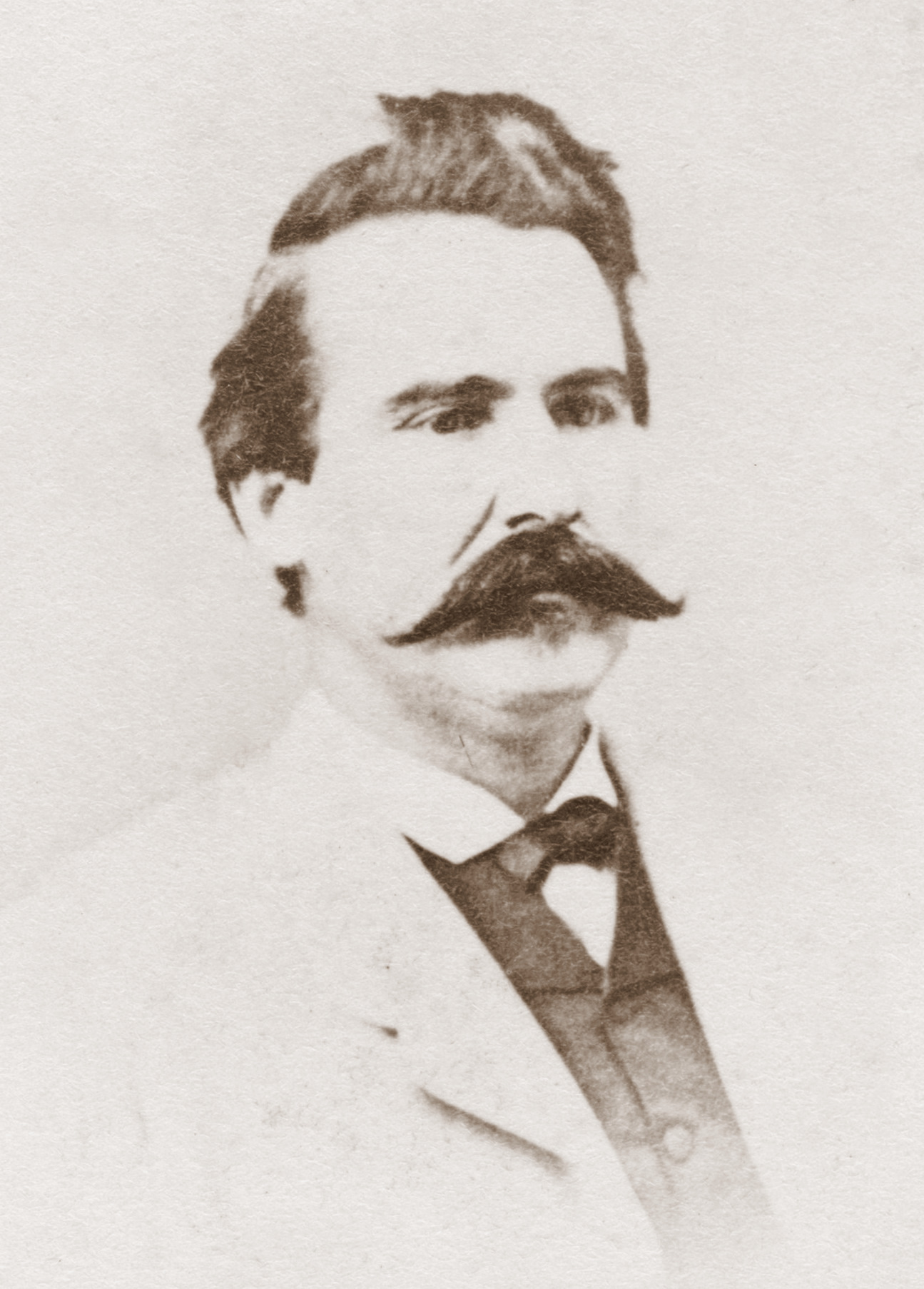
- Born: Alexander Watkins Terrell; November 23, 1827; Patrick County, Virginia, U.S.
- Died: September 9, 1912 (aged 84); Mineral Wells, Texas, U.S.
- Resting place: Texas State Cemetery
- Education: University of Missouri
- Occupations: Lawyer, planter, diplomat
- Spouses: Ann Elizabeth Boulding; Sarah D. Mitchell; Anne Holliday Jones
- Children: 8
- Parent(s): Christopher Joseph Terrell; Susan Kennerly
- Military career
- Allegiance: Confederate States; Second Mexican Empire
- Branch: Confederate Army; Mexican Army
- Service years: 1863–1865
- Rank: Major (CSA); Acting Brigadier General
- Units: 1st Texas Cavalry Regiment; 34th Texas Regiment
- Conflicts: American Civil War: Red River Campaign

Alexander Watkins Terrell (November 23, 1827 – September 9, 1912) was an American lawyer, judge, planter, Confederate officer, and diplomat. He served as the U. S. Envoy to the Ottoman Empire and a Confederate military officer. He helped pass influential legislation including the Terrell Election Law, served as president of the Texas State Historical Association and on the board of regents for the University of Texas.

== Early life ==
Alexander Watkins Terrell was born on November 23, 1827, in Patrick County, Virginia. His father was Christopher Joseph Terrell and his mother, Susan Kennerly. His Quaker family moved to Boonville, Missouri, in 1831.

Terrell graduated from the University of Missouri and was admitted to the bar in 1849.

== Career ==
Terrell practiced law in St. Joseph, Missouri. In 1852, he moved to Austin, Texas. He served as a district court judge from 1857 until 1863.

On July 4, 1861, Terrell gave a speech on the Texas State Capitol in defense of the Confederate States of America. He drew a parallel between George Washington and the secession of the Confederacy.

When his term as judge came to an end, Terrell joined the 1st Texas Cavalry Regiment of the Confederate States Army as major. He fought in several major battles as part of the Red River Campaign including the Battle of Mansfield. On May 16, 1865, Terrell was assigned to duty as a brigadier general by General E. Kirby Smith. He was never officially appointed by Confederate President Jefferson Davis and confirmed by the Confederate Senate to that grade.

Davis was captured by Union forces on May 10, 1865, and Smith soon accepted the Appomattox surrender terms agreed to by Lieutenant General Simon Bolivar Buckner on May 26, 1865, pending Smith's approval.

Terrell fled to Mexico after the war and briefly served Emperor Maximilian as a battalion commander. In 1866 he returned to Texas, where he practised the law in Houston. Subsequently, he spent time on his plantation in Robertson County, Texas.

After Reconstruction, he served in both the Texas Senate and House of Representatives, serving sixteen years in the state legislature. From 1893 until 1897, he was minister plenipotentiary to the Ottoman Empire during U.S. President Grover Cleveland's second administration. From 1909 to 1911, he was a member of the University of Texas board of regents. He also served as the president of the Texas State Historical Association.

== Personal life ==
Terrell married Ann Elizabeth Boulding. They had five children. After she died in 1860, he married Sarah D. Mitchell. They had three children.

== Death and legacy ==
Terrell died on September 9, 1912, in Mineral Wells, Texas. He was buried at the Texas State Cemetery in Austin, Texas. Terrell County, Texas, is named in his honor.

== See also ==
- List of American Civil War generals (Acting Confederate)
