= Rogów raid =

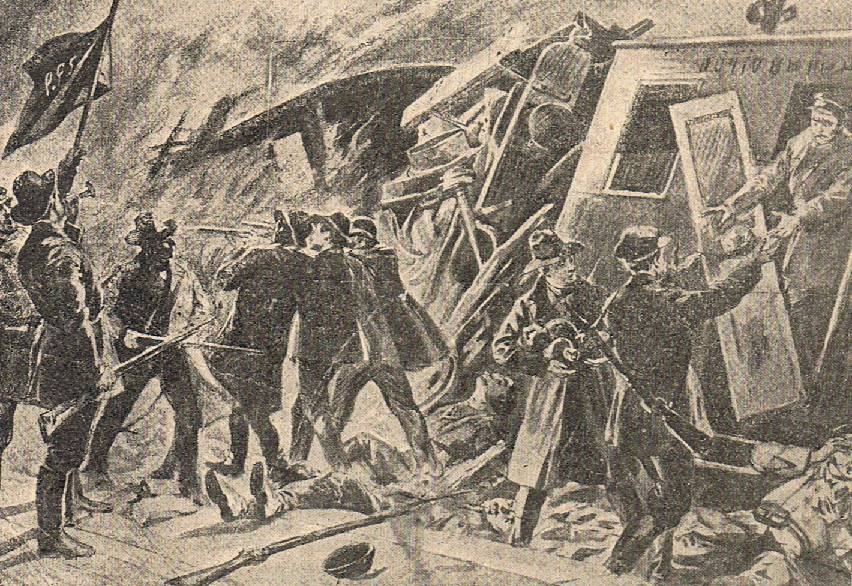
- Native name: Akcja pod Rogowem
- Date: November 8, 1906
- Location: Rogów, Congress Poland
- Type: Train robbery
- Motive: Extortion
- Perpetrator: Combat Organization of the Polish Socialist Party
- Organised by: Józef Mirecki
- Participants: Władysław Kołakowski; Jan Kwapiński; Zdzisław Rogalewicz
- Outcome: Theft of ₽37,000

The Rogow raid was a train robbery, carried out on November 8, 1906, in the village of Rogow, near the city of Łódź, Congress Poland. It was carried out by 49 members of Łódź branch of the Combat Organization of the Polish Socialist Party, under Jozef “Montwill” Mirecki. They attacked a Russian Empire mail train, stealing money and securities.

In 1927, the Robotnik newspaper published memoirs of Jan Kwapinski, who himself took part in the raid. In the same year, the memoirs were printed in a book “Organizacja Bojowa – Katorga – Rewolucja Rosyjska”, with a foreword by Ignacy Daszynski.

As Kwapinski wrote, 1906 was a difficult year for inhabitants of Russian-controlled Congress Poland. They were repressed by Tsarist police and Cossacks of the Russian Imperial Army, and Polish taxpayers had to support them with their money. During one of its meetings, the Combat Organization of the Polish Socialist Party decided to confiscate the money of Polish taxpayers, and use it to fight Tsarist oppression. “At that time, we had received a number of fantastic mauser rifles. The Combat Organization found out that a Russian train with money would move along the Warsaw–Vienna railway. A rail station of Rogow, located 10 minutes from the hub of Koluszki, was chosen for the raid”, wrote Kwapinski.

Before the raid, selected members of the Combat Organization walked the distance from Rogow to Łódź, to get acquainted with the area. Russian garrisons were stationed in all towns of the region, and to escape capture, the Poles had to quickly cross a forest, which stretched between Koluszki and Brzeziny, in order to get back to Łódź as quickly as possible. “On the selected day before the raid, we gathered along a rail line between Łódź Kaliska railway station and Łódź Widzew railway station. After it got dark, we set on the route towards Rogow, to get there in the morning (...) Tired after reaching our destination, we waited for the evening, for the mail train going from Russian-Austrian border to Warsaw”.

At around noon, two Combat Organization members were sent to check the situation at the station. To their surprise, a unit of Cossacks from Brzeziny was present there. Their task was to protect governor of the Piotrkow Governorate, who came for an inspection. The Poles, aware of superiority of their Cossack enemies, decided to postpone the raid and returned to Łódź: “Almost all members of the organization were weavers, who had to return to work at 6 a.m. (...) Two weeks later, Comrade Grzegorz came to my apartment at Nowa Street, telling me that in two weeks we had to take a train to Rogow. All conspirators were to be armed with rifles and Finnish knives”.

Poles divided themselves into several teams, tasked with capturing the station, cutting off communications links, and keeping all passengers away from the train: “We arrived at Rogow at 8:06, while the mail train was to arrive here in eleven minutes (...) We moved quickly, telling all passengers to lie down on the ground. One of our guys threw a bomb into a car full of Russian soldiers. After a few seconds they started to run away (...) The raid lasted 18 minutes, and when it was over, Comrade Grzegorz thanked us, wishing a safe return to Łódź. We walked for one kilometer towards Warsaw, singing Warszawianka. Then we turned into a dense forest, heading to Łódź. Suddenly we heard noises. We dropped to the ground, watching a unit of Cossacks riding their horses towards the burning Rogow station. As soon as they had disappeared, we crossed the road and kept walking for three and half hours. We were in high spirits, finally reaching Chojny in the suburbs of Łódź. None of us was wounded or arrested. Altogether, 37,000 roubles were stolen from the train”.

== See also ==
- Bezdany raid

== Sources ==
- Jan Kwapinski's description of the raid
