= Terrell County Independent School District =

School district in Texas

Coordinates: 30°8′30″N 102°23′40″W

Terrell County Independent School District is a public school district based in the community of Sanderson, Texas, United States.

As of 2007, the Texas State Energy Conservation Office awarded the district money for the colonias served by the district.

== Academic achievement ==
In 2009, the school district was rated "recognized" by the Texas Education Agency.

== Schools ==
Terrell County ISD operates these schools:

- Sanderson High School
- Sanderson Junior High School
- Sanderson Elementary School

== Athletics ==
Sanderson High School plays six-man football.

== See also ==
- List of school districts in Texas
