= Terrell County Sun =

The Terrell County Sun is a newspaper published in Sanderson, Texas, operated by a nonprofit corporation. The first issue was published in November 2013. As of that year, the editor is Allison Taylor. The headquarters is located on Main Street, in a building that was previously a beauty parlor. The printing for the newspaper occurs in Del Rio.

The newspaper describes itself as a local-interest publication. It states: “You won't find us publishing letters to the editor, political statements or news that is not directly related to our community." Each issue is $0.50 and the newspaper charges $25 for one year of delivery to someone's residence. Taylor stated in December 2013 that the newspaper had a circulation of 500 and that there were 35 subscriptions.

The newspaper replaced the Terrell County News-Leader, which closed in July 2013. Between the closing of the News-Leader and the opening of the Sun the only source of local news was a bulletin board. Taylor stated that "The first issue was very well received. The community is really excited to have a newspaper again to get information from rather than the board at the post office."
