= Sanderson, Texas =

- Census-designated place
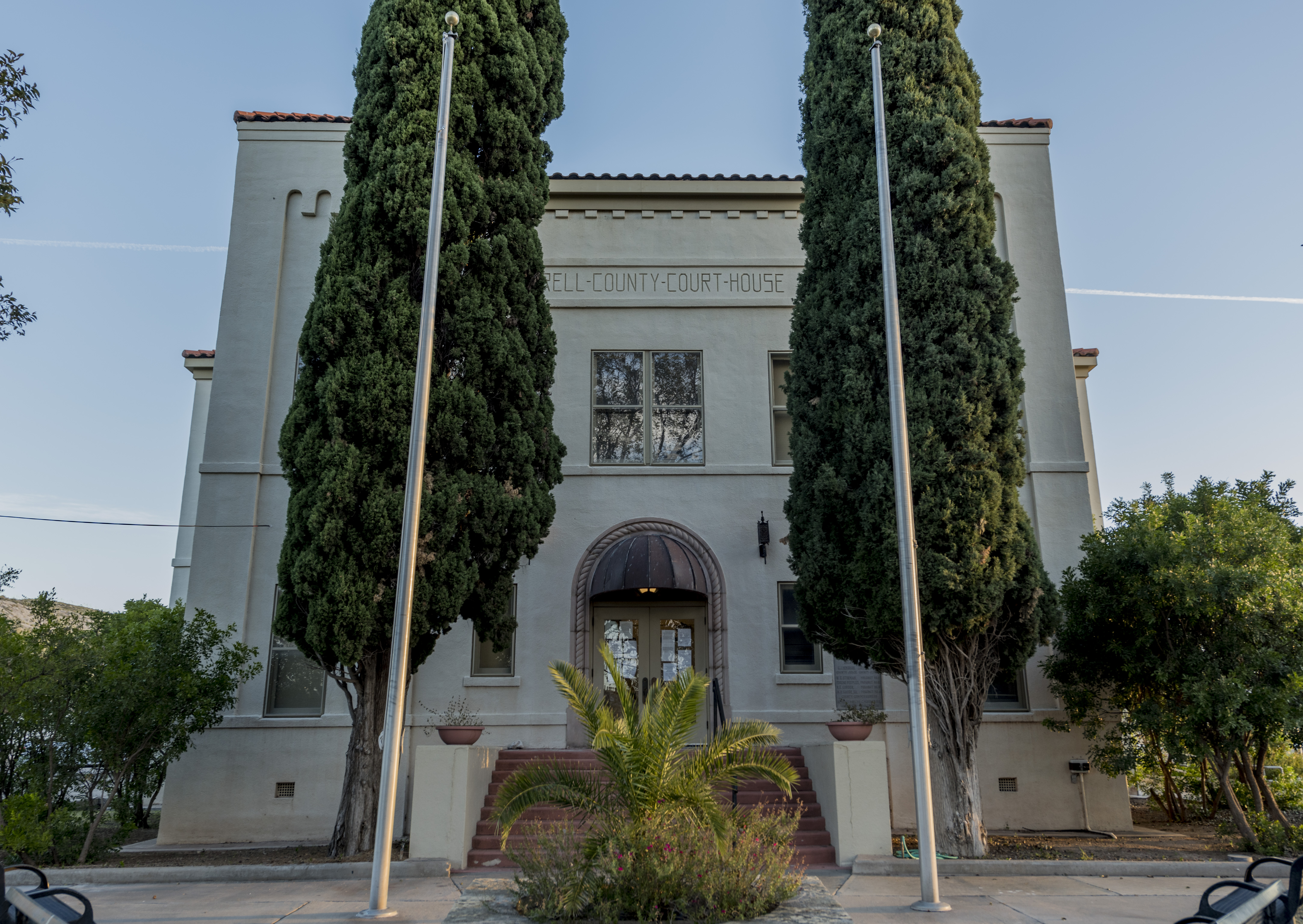
- Terrell County Courthouse in Sanderson

- Location in the state of Texas Sanderson, Texas (the United States)
- Coordinates: 30°09′03″N 102°24′29″W
- Country: United States
- State: Texas
- County: Terrell

Area
  - Total: 4.2 sq mi (10.8 km^{2})
  - Land: 4.2 sq mi (10.8 km^{2})
  - Water: 0 sq mi (0.0 km^{2})
- Elevation: 2,868 ft (874 m)

Population (2020)
  - Total: 664
  - Density: 159/sq mi (61.5/km^{2})
- Time zone: UTC-6 (Central (CST))
  - Summer (DST): UTC-5 (CDT)
- ZIP code: 79848
- Area code: 432
- FIPS code: 48-65084
- GNIS feature ID: 1346563

Sanderson is a census-designated place (CDP) in and the county seat of Terrell County, Texas, United States. Its population was 664 at the 2020 census. Sanderson was created in 1882 as a part of neighboring Pecos County. It became the seat of Terrell County in 1905.

== History ==
Sanderson was founded in 1882. It was a division point for the Southern Pacific Railroad, where refueling and crew changes on its main transcontinental route took place. Mohair and wool production on surrounding ranches formed a significant part of the economy. The community entered in an economic decline when the operations involving sheep and goats decreased.

A devastating flood in June 1965 killed 26 people and washed away homes and businesses near the usually dry Sanderson Creek. Since then, many flood-control dams have been erected across the arroyos upstream from the town.

An illustrated tour brochure guides visitors past 50 historic sites, including several notable buildings remaining from the town's more prosperous era. The 1906 courthouse was built to designs by Henry Phelps, but the still-graceful building was much modified in 1932, 1950, and 1983. Facing the courthouse square is the little-changed 1931 Art Deco-style Sanderson High School, designed by Ralph W. Cameron, one of San Antonio's leading architects of the period. A handsome Deco frieze above the entranceway illustrates TRUTH CULTURE PROGRESS SUCCESS. Nearby is a Classical Revival structure built as a Masonic lodge, but used for many years now as a private residence.

After regulations changed in 1995, the Southern Pacific ended the practice of changing train crews (and overnighting them) in Sanderson. By 2013, the community had lost most of the businesses and half of the population it had at its peak.

Two tornadoes struck Sanderson on June 2, 2024, significantly damaging or destroying several homes and injuring 12 people. These tornadoes were rated EF1 and EF3 on the Enhanced Fujita scale.

== Geography ==
According to the United States Census Bureau, the CDP has a total area of 4.2 square miles (10.9 km^{2}), all land.

Sanderson is located on U.S. Route 90, 120 miles (190 km) west of Del Rio.

=== Climate ===
Sanderson has a hot, semiarid climate (Köppen BSh) bordering on both a cool semiarid climate (BSk) and a hot desert climate (BWh). Winters feature mild, sunny days and cold or freezing nights. Summers are hot, with occasional thunderstorms providing the only significant source of precipitation except for occasional remnant hurricanes moving inland from the Gulf of Mexico.

Climate data for Sanderson, Texas (Jan 1, 1897–Mar 31, 2013)
Month	Jan	Feb	Mar	Apr	May	Jun	Jul	Aug	Sep	Oct	Nov	Dec	Year
Record high °F (°C)	87 (31)	94 (34)	96 (36)	101 (38)	109 (43)	110 (43)	107 (42)	106 (41)	106 (41)	102 (39)	94 (34)	85 (29)	110 (43)
Mean daily maximum °F (°C)	60.8 (16.0)	64.5 (18.1)	72.9 (22.7)	81.5 (27.5)	87.3 (30.7)	92.0 (33.3)	92.6 (33.7)	92.4 (33.6)	86.9 (30.5)	78.8 (26.0)	69.2 (20.7)	61.3 (16.3)	78.4 (25.8)
Daily mean °F (°C)	46.1 (7.8)	49.6 (9.8)	57.6 (14.2)	66.6 (19.2)	73.7 (23.2)	79.6 (26.4)	81.0 (27.2)	80.4 (26.9)	74.6 (23.7)	65.1 (18.4)	54.7 (12.6)	46.8 (8.2)	64.7 (18.2)
Mean daily minimum °F (°C)	31.4 (−0.3)	34.8 (1.6)	42.3 (5.7)	51.7 (10.9)	60.2 (15.7)	67.3 (19.6)	69.4 (20.8)	68.4 (20.2)	62.3 (16.8)	51.4 (10.8)	40.2 (4.6)	32.3 (0.2)	51.0 (10.6)
Record low °F (°C)	7 (−14)	4 (−16)	12 (−11)	22 (−6)	37 (3)	40 (4)	49 (9)	54 (12)	40 (4)	21 (−6)	12 (−11)	3 (−16)	3 (−16)
Average rainfall inches (mm)	0.46 (12)	0.54 (14)	0.42 (11)	0.79 (20)	1.62 (41)	1.73 (44)	1.42 (36)	1.50 (38)	2.14 (54)	1.49 (38)	0.59 (15)	0.42 (11)	13.12 (334)
Average snowfall inches (cm)	0.2 (0.51)	0.0 (0.0)	0.1 (0.25)	0.0 (0.0)	0.0 (0.0)	0.0 (0.0)	0.0 (0.0)	0.0 (0.0)	0.0 (0.0)	0.0 (0.0)	0.0 (0.0)	0.1 (0.25)	0.4 (1.01)
Average rainy days (≥ 0.01 in)	3	3	2	2	4	4	3	4	5	4	2	2	38
Source: Western Regional Climate Center, Desert Research Institute

== Demographics ==
Historical population
Census	Pop.	Note	%±
1970	1,229		—
1980	1,241		1.0%
1990	1,126		−9.3%
2000	861		−23.5%
2010	837		−2.8%
2020	664		−20.7%
U.S. Decennial Census; 1850–1900 1910; 1920 1930 1940; 1950 1960 1970; 1980 1990 2000; 2010

Sanderson first appeared as a census-designated place in the 1970 U.S. census.

=== 2020 census ===
Sanderson CDP, Texas – Racial and ethnic composition Note: the US Census treats Hispanic/Latino as an ethnic category. This table excludes Latinos from the racial categories and assigns them to a separate category. Hispanics/Latinos may be of any race.
Race / Ethnicity (NH = Non-Hispanic)	Pop 2000	Pop 2010	Pop 2020	% 2000	% 2010	% 2020
White alone (NH)	392	395	274	45.53%	47.19%	41.27%
Black or African American alone (NH)	0	2	8	0.00%	0.24%	1.20%
Native American or Alaska Native alone (NH)	18	4	0	2.09%	0.48%	0.00%
Asian alone (NH)	6	3	5	0.70%	0.36%	0.75%
Other race alone (NH)	1	0	2	0.12%	0.00%	0.30%
Multiracial (NH)	1	3	17	0.12%	0.36%	2.56%
Hispanic or Latino (any race)	443	430	358	51.45%	51.37%	53.92%
Total	861	837	664	100.00%	100.00%	100.00%

As of the 2020 United States census, 664 people, 312 households, and 199 families were residing in the CDP.

=== 2000 census ===
As of the 2000 census, 861 people, 356 households, and 237 families resided in the CDP. The population density was 206 inhabitants per square mile (80/km^{2}). The 635 housing units averaged 151.7/sq mi (58.5/km^{2}). The racial makeup of the CDP was 86.88% White, 2.09% Native American, 0.70% Asian, 9.18% from other races, and 1.16% from two or more races. Hispanics or Latinos of any race were 51.45% of the population.

Of the 356 households, 29.2% had children under 18 living with them, 53.4% were married couples living together, 8.4% had a female householder with no husband present, and 33.4% were not families. About 32.0% of all households were made up of individuals, and 18.5% had someone living alone who was 65 or older. The average household size was 2.42 and the average family size was 3.08.

In the CDP, the population was distributed as 25.9% under 18, 5.6% from 18 to 24, 22.1% from 25 to 44, 26.4% from 45 to 64, and 20.1% who were 65 or older. The median age was 43 years. For every 100 females, there were 97.0 males. For every 100 females 18 and over, there were 92.2 males.

The median income in the CDP for a household was $23,594 and for a family was $29,500. Males had a median income of $22,946 versus $14,453 for females. The per capita income for the CDP was $13,714. About 21.8% of families and 26.9% of the population were below the poverty line, including 33.5% of those under 18 and 31.4% of those 65 or over.

== Education ==
Sanderson is served by the Terrell County Independent School District and is home to the Sanderson High School Eagles.

Both the high school and junior high school have a six-man football team.

== Media ==
The Terrell County Sun's first issue was published in late November 2013. It was established to replace the previous paper, the Terrell County News-Leader, which closed in July 2013. In the interim, the only source of local news was a bulletin board. Kenn Norris, a county commissioner, stated that the San Angelo Standard-Times was previously distributed in the community. Norris stated in 2013 that no radio reception exists in Sanderson, and the television in the community as of 1989 came from Colorado.

== Infrastructure ==
=== Transportation ===
- US 90
- US 285
- Sanderson station, served by Amtrak’s Sunset Limited and Texas Eagle, operating between Los Angeles and New Orleans or Chicago
- Terrell County Airport is nearby, providing general-aviation service

== In popular culture ==
Sanderson is the location of the trailer park where Llewellyn Moss lives in the 2005 Cormac McCarthy novel and 2007 Coen Brothers film No Country for Old Men. It is also the destination of the truckload of down-on-their-luck Mexicans looking for work in McCarthy's third Border Trilogy book Cities of the Plain (1998).

== See also ==
- Baxter's Curve Train Robbery
