= Dryden, Texas =

Dryden
- Unincorporated community
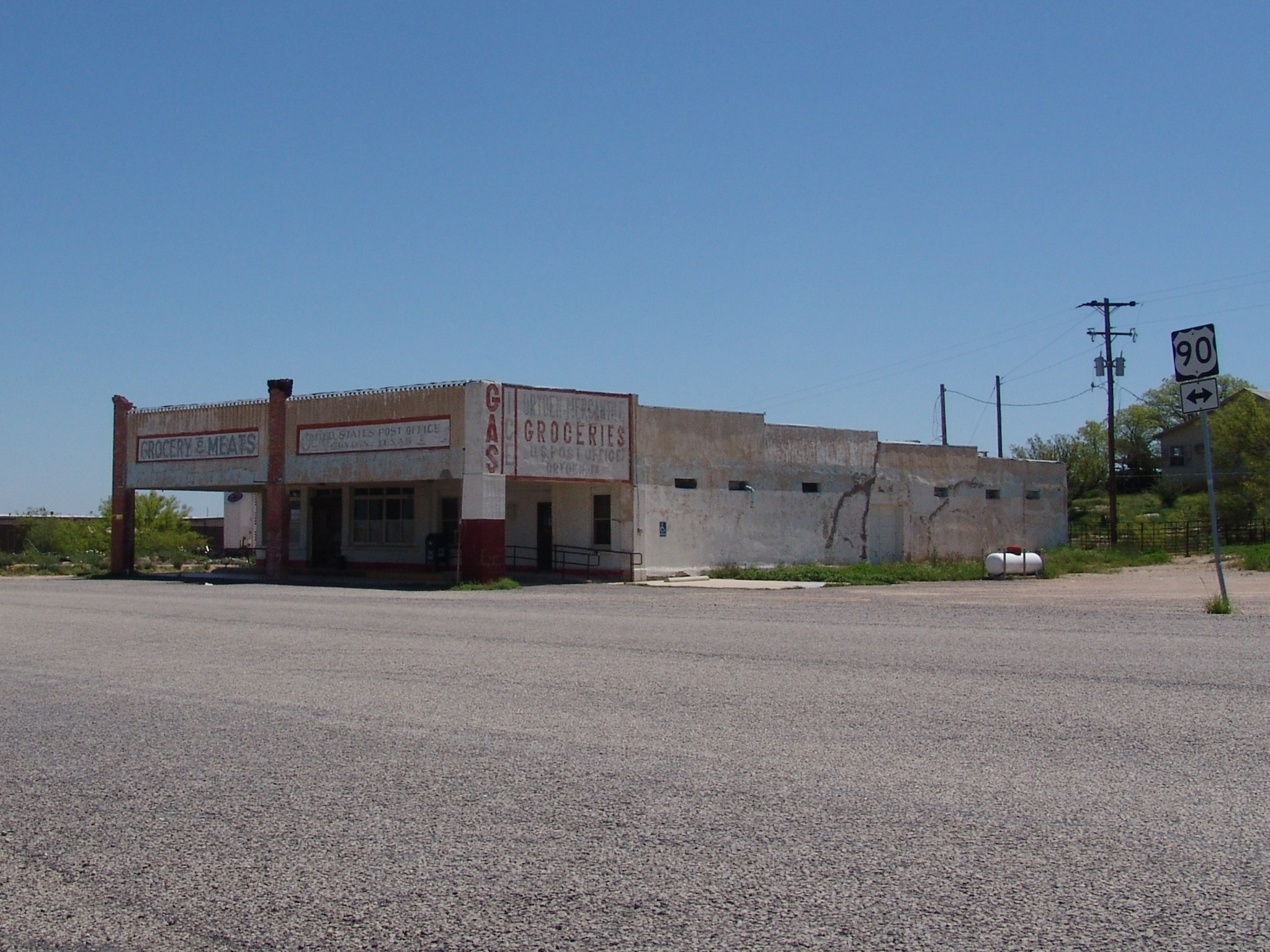
- Dryden Post Office

- Location in the state of Texas Dryden (the United States)
- Coordinates: 30°02′41″N 102°06′52″W
- Country: United States
- State: Texas
- County: Terrell
- Elevation: 2,110 ft (640 m)

Population
  - Total: 13−33
- Time zone: UTC-6 (Central (CST))
  - Summer (DST): UTC-5 (CDT)
- ZIP codes: 78851
- Area code: 432
- GNIS feature ID: 1334709

Dryden is an unincorporated community in south central Terrell County, Texas, United States. While one source indicates a population of 33, another suggests it has dwindled to 13, which can be considered a ghost town. ZIP code 78851, which includes Dryden, is estimated to have a population of 94.

== History ==
The community was founded in 1882 and named for Eugene E. Dryden. He was the chief engineer of the Galveston, Harrisburg and San Antonio Railway, which established a section house at Dryden when building its tracks through Terrell County. Over the next several decades Dryden became a small center for ranching-based businesses. The headquarters for the Pecos Land and Cattle Company were established in Dryden in 1884. The company drilled a well that supplied the area with water.

By 1912, the Dryden Hotel had been established, along with a combined schoolhouse, community center, and church. Dryden had a population of nearly 100 by 1929. Two units of U.S. Army troops were stationed in Dryden during the 1913–17 Mexican border unrest. During the Great Depression of the 1930s, the railway closed the Dryden depot and relocated its crews, and the area’s ranches were eventually broken up. The population had dwindled to approximately fifty by 1970. The population continued to decline to 13 by 1988 although a general store was still operating in 1995.

The post office dated from 1888; however, the United States Postal Service no longer maintains a post office in Dryden. Amtrak's Sunset Limited passes through the town on Union Pacific tracks, but makes no stop. A stop is located 20 miles (32 km) to the west in the nearby town of Sanderson.

== Geography ==
Dryden is located on U.S. Route 90 at the southern terminus of State Highway 349, 20 miles (32 km) east of Terrell County's county seat Sanderson and 100 miles (160 km) west of Del Rio.

== Climate ==
Elevation: 2,110 feet (643 m).

Climate data for Dryden, Texas (Jun 1, 1966–Oct 31, 1994)
Month	Jan	Feb	Mar	Apr	May	Jun	Jul	Aug	Sep	Oct	Nov	Dec	Year
Record high °F (°C)	87 (31)	95 (35)	98 (37)	103 (39)	110 (43)	112 (44)	111 (44)	110 (43)	106 (41)	103 (39)	90 (32)	87 (31)	112 (44)
Mean daily maximum °F (°C)	60.2 (15.7)	65.0 (18.3)	74.3 (23.5)	82.7 (28.2)	88.8 (31.6)	94.5 (34.7)	95.5 (35.3)	94.8 (34.9)	88.8 (31.6)	79.9 (26.6)	69.2 (20.7)	61.8 (16.6)	79.6 (26.4)
Daily mean °F (°C)	46.5 (8.1)	50.5 (10.3)	59.2 (15.1)	68.1 (20.1)	75.2 (24.0)	81.5 (27.5)	83.1 (28.4)	82.1 (27.8)	76.3 (24.6)	66.3 (19.1)	55.3 (12.9)	47.8 (8.8)	66.0 (18.9)
Mean daily minimum °F (°C)	32.7 (0.4)	36.0 (2.2)	44.0 (6.7)	53.4 (11.9)	61.6 (16.4)	68.6 (20.3)	70.6 (21.4)	69.4 (20.8)	63.8 (17.7)	52.6 (11.4)	41.7 (5.4)	33.8 (1.0)	52.3 (11.3)
Record low °F (°C)	10 (−12)	1 (−17)	12 (−11)	24 (−4)	40 (4)	49 (9)	60 (16)	59 (15)	38 (3)	27 (−3)	17 (−8)	1 (−17)	1 (−17)
Average precipitation inches (mm)	0.53 (13)	1.03 (26)	0.57 (14)	0.99 (25)	1.75 (44)	1.02 (26)	1.27 (32)	1.85 (47)	2.64 (67)	1.40 (36)	0.74 (19)	0.45 (11)	14.24 (362)
Average snowfall inches (cm)	0.6 (1.5)	0.2 (0.51)	0.0 (0.0)	0.0 (0.0)	0.0 (0.0)	0.0 (0.0)	0.0 (0.0)	0.0 (0.0)	0.0 (0.0)	0.0 (0.0)	0.1 (0.25)	0.0 (0.0)	0.9 (2.3)
Average precipitation days (≥ 0.01 in)	3	3	2	2	4	3	3	3	5	3	2	2	35
Source: Western Regional Climate Center, Desert Research Institute

== See also ==
- List of ghost towns in Texas
