= Terrell County, Texas =

County in Texas, United States

- County
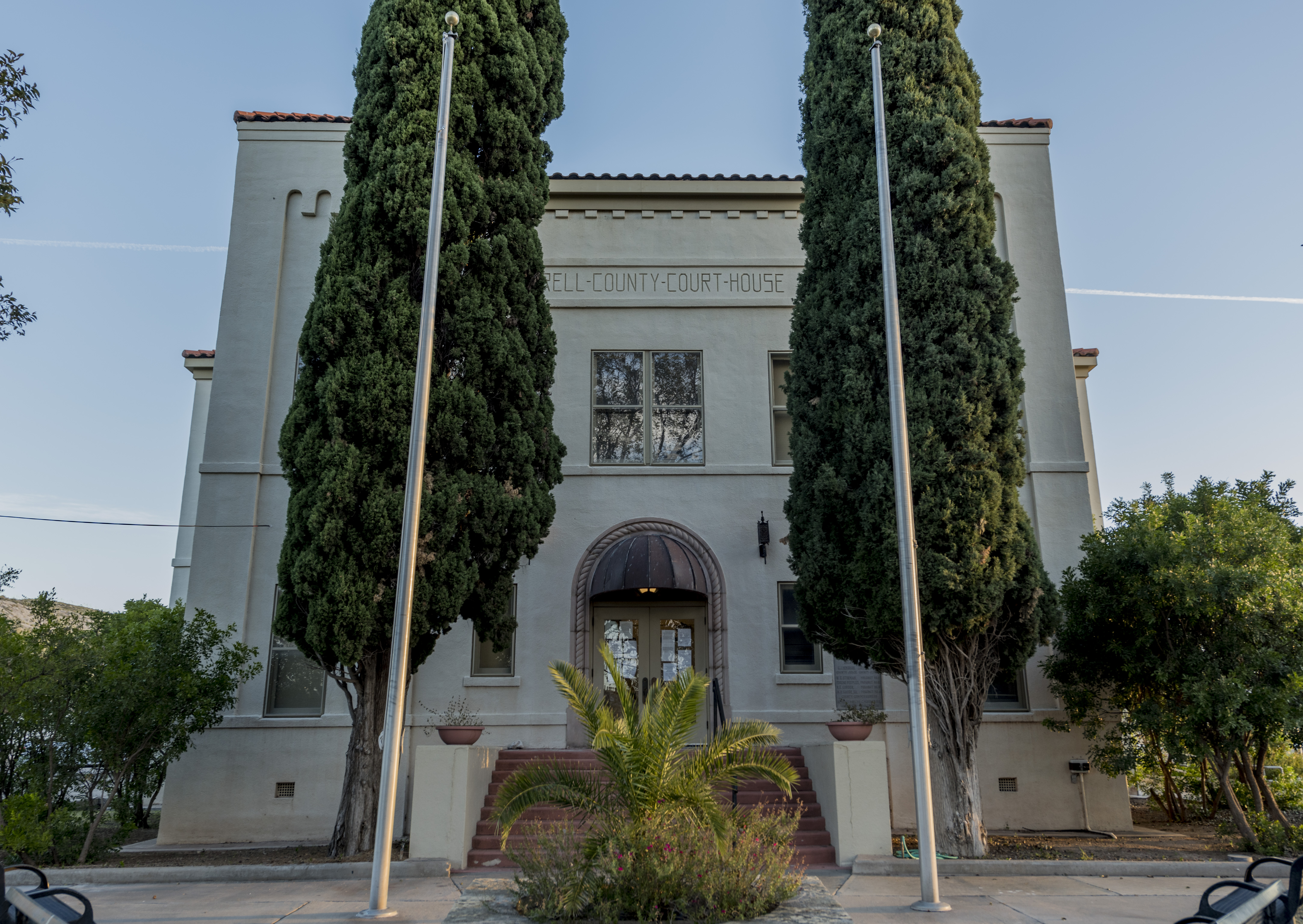
- Terrell County Courthouse in Sanderson.

- Flag

- Location within the U.S. state of Texas
- Coordinates: 30°14′N 102°04′W
- Country: United States
- State: Texas
- Founded: 1905
- Named for: Alexander W. Terrell
- Seat: Sanderson
- Largest community: Sanderson

Area
  - Total: 2,358 sq mi (6,110 km^{2})
  - Land: 2,358 sq mi (6,110 km^{2})
  - Water: 0.04 sq mi (0.10 km^{2}) 0%

Population (2020)
  - Total: 760
  - Estimate (2025): 702 ▼
  - Density: 0.32/sq mi (0.12/km^{2})
- Time zone: UTC−6 (Central)
  - Summer (DST): UTC−5 (CDT)
- Congressional district: 23rd
- Website: www.co.terrell.tx.us

Terrell County is a county in the U.S. state of Texas. As of the 2020 census, its population was 760, making it the seventh-least populous county in Texas, and the 37th-least populous county in the nation. Its county seat is the census-designated place of Sanderson; no incorporated municipalities are in the county. The county was named for Alexander W. Terrell, a Texas state senator. Terrell County is one of the nine counties in the Trans-Pecos region of West Texas. It is the setting for Cormac McCarthy's novel No Country for Old Men, and the Academy Award-winning film adaptation of the same name.

== History ==
=== Native Americans ===
Evidence of the indigenous peoples of Terrell County are found on the county's various ranches – arrowheads, tools, burned-rock middens, caves, and shelters containing Indian pictographs. Pieces of reed sandals, baskets, and evidence of burials have been found in the caves. The most pictographs are on cliff walls above Myers Spring near Dryden, overpainting giving to the theory that several Indian cultures were involved.

=== Early exploration ===
Capt. José de Berroterán in 1729 commanded an expedition on behalf of Spain to explore from Mission San Juan Bautista up the Rio Grande to the mouth of the Rio Conchos. Berroterán crossed the southern border, where at a spring near Dryden, legend has it that he placed a large wooden cross. Six years later, another Spaniard, Blas María de la Garza Falcón, found the cross while conducting an expedition in the area and named the spot Santa Cruz de Maya. Captain Samuel Highsmith, under the command of John Coffee Hays, crossed the county in 1848 in an ill-fated expedition to open a road from San Antonio to El Paso. In 1851 Army officer and geographer Lt. Nathaniel Michler, working under Major William H. Emory, mapped this portion of the boundary between Mexico and the United States. Under Lt. William Echols in 1859, caravans of the U.S. Camel Corps crossed the county searching for a shorter route to Fort Davis.

=== County established and growth ===
In 1905, Terrell County was created by the Texas Legislature by carving about 1,500,000 acres (6,100 km^{2}) out of Pecos County. It was organized the same year. Sanderson became the county seat. In 1881, Texas and New Orleans Railroad surveyors reached the site of present-day Sanderson. Originally named Strawbridge by founder Cyrus W. “Charley” Wilson, the name was later changed in honor of railroad Engineer Joseph P. Sanderson. Charles Downie, a Scot, homesteaded in 1881 and became the first permanent sheepman in the area. Together, the railroad, cattle, and sheep industries were the major economic assets. Ranges were still unfenced. Dryden became a large shipping point for cattle ranchers. Terrell County became one of the biggest sheep and wool producers in the U.S. In 1926, 11,000 lambs averaging $6 per head were sold in one of the largest lamb sales in history. Thousands of pounds of wool and mohair were sold annually through the Sanderson Wool Commission. Dryden, the only town besides Sanderson in the county, was also started in 1882, but is now a ghost town. Judge Roy Bean is said to have operated a saloon at Sanderson. The oil and gas industry became increasingly important to Terrell County's economy after 1957, when the Brown-Bassett gas field was discovered in the northeast part of the county. Only gas was produced until the 1970s, when high petroleum prices encouraged limited oil production, as well. Sanderson was struck by a flood on June 11, 1965, in which 28 people died. Two of them were never found. The Texas State Senate Concurrent Resolution No. 1, 76th Legislature, Regular Session (1999) declared Sanderson and Terrell County the "Cactus Capital of Texas."

== Geography ==
According to the United States Census Bureau, the county has a total area of 2,358 square miles (6,110 km^{2}), virtually all of which is land.

=== Major highways ===
- U.S. Highway 90
- U.S. Highway 285
- State Highway 349

=== Adjacent counties and municipios ===
- Pecos County (north)
- Crockett County (north)
- Val Verde County (east)
- Brewster County (southwest)
- Acuña, Coahuila, Mexico (south)

=== National protected area ===
- Rio Grande Wild and Scenic River (part)

== Climate ==
Most of Terrell County consists of semiarid steppes with 85.7% of the county's area described as having a hot steppe climate (Köppen BSh) and 2.6% having a cold steppe climate (Köppen BSk). The remaining 11.7% of the county experiences a hot arid desert climate (Köppen BWh).

Dryden

- Coordinates: 30.05000°N 102.11667°W
- Elevation: 2,190 feet (668 m)

Climate data for Dryden, Texas (Jun 1, 1966–Oct 31, 1994)
Month	Jan	Feb	Mar	Apr	May	Jun	Jul	Aug	Sep	Oct	Nov	Dec	Year
Mean daily maximum °F (°C)	60.2 (15.7)	65.0 (18.3)	74.3 (23.5)	82.7 (28.2)	88.8 (31.6)	94.5 (34.7)	95.5 (35.3)	94.8 (34.9)	88.8 (31.6)	79.9 (26.6)	69.2 (20.7)	61.8 (16.6)	79.6 (26.5)
Mean daily minimum °F (°C)	32.7 (0.4)	36.0 (2.2)	44.0 (6.7)	53.4 (11.9)	61.6 (16.4)	68.6 (20.3)	70.6 (21.4)	69.4 (20.8)	63.8 (17.7)	52.6 (11.4)	41.7 (5.4)	33.8 (1.0)	52.4 (11.3)
Average precipitation inches (mm)	0.53 (13)	1.03 (26)	0.57 (14)	0.99 (25)	1.75 (44)	1.02 (26)	1.27 (32)	1.85 (47)	2.64 (67)	1.40 (36)	0.74 (19)	0.45 (11)	14.24 (360)
Source: Western Regional Climate Center, Desert Research Institute

Sanderson

- Coordinates: 30.14139°N 102.39167°W
- Elevation: 2,788 feet (850 m)

Climate data for Sanderson, Texas (Jan 1, 1897–Mar 31, 2013)
Month	Jan	Feb	Mar	Apr	May	Jun	Jul	Aug	Sep	Oct	Nov	Dec	Year
Mean daily maximum °F (°C)	60.8 (16.0)	64.5 (18.1)	72.9 (22.7)	81.5 (27.5)	87.3 (30.7)	92.0 (33.3)	92.6 (33.7)	92.4 (33.6)	86.9 (30.5)	78.8 (26.0)	69.2 (20.7)	61.3 (16.3)	78.4 (25.8)
Mean daily minimum °F (°C)	31.4 (−0.3)	34.8 (1.6)	42.3 (5.7)	51.7 (10.9)	60.2 (15.7)	67.3 (19.6)	69.4 (20.8)	68.4 (20.2)	62.3 (16.8)	51.4 (10.8)	40.2 (4.6)	32.3 (0.2)	51.0 (10.5)
Average precipitation inches (mm)	0.46 (12)	0.54 (14)	0.42 (11)	0.79 (20)	1.62 (41)	1.73 (44)	1.42 (36)	1.50 (38)	2.14 (54)	1.49 (38)	0.59 (15)	0.42 (11)	13.12 (334)
Source: Western Regional Climate Center, Desert Research Institute

== Demographics ==
Historical population
Census	Pop.	Note	%±
1910	1,430		—
1920	1,595		11.5%
1930	2,660		66.8%
1940	2,952		11.0%
1950	3,189		8.0%
1960	2,600		−18.5%
1970	1,940		−25.4%
1980	1,595		−17.8%
1990	1,410		−11.6%
2000	1,081		−23.3%
2010	984		−9.0%
2020	760		−22.8%
2025 (est.)	702	▼	−7.6%
U.S. Decennial Census; 1850–2010 2010-2020

=== Racial and ethnic composition ===
Terrell County, Texas – Racial and ethnic composition Note: the US Census treats Hispanic/Latino as an ethnic category. This table excludes Latinos from the racial categories and assigns them to a separate category. Hispanics/Latinos may be of any race.
Race / Ethnicity (NH = Non-Hispanic)	Pop 1980	Pop 1990	Pop 2000	Pop 2010	Pop 2020	% 1980	% 1990	% 2000	% 2010	% 2020
White alone (NH)	899	651	529	495	352	56.36%	46.17%	48.94%	50.30%	46.32%
Black or African American alone (NH)	2	1	0	6	8	0.13%	0.07%	0.00%	0.61%	1.05%
Native American or Alaska Native alone (NH)	2	3	18	7	0	0.13%	0.21%	1.67%	0.71%	0.00%
Asian alone (NH)	1	2	7	4	5	0.06%	0.14%	0.65%	0.41%	0.66%
Native Hawaiian or Pacific Islander alone (NH)	x	x	0	0	0	x	x	0.00%	0.00%	0.00%
Other race alone (NH)	0	2	1	0	2	0.00%	0.14%	0.09%	0.00%	0.26%
Mixed race or Multiracial (NH)	x	x	1	5	23	x	x	0.09%	0.51%	3.03%
Hispanic or Latino (any race)	691	751	525	467	370	43.32%	53.26%	48.57%	47.46%	48.68%
Total	1,595	1,410	1,081	984	760	100.00%	100.00%	100.00%	100.00%	100.00%

=== 2020 census ===
As of the 2020 census, the county had a population of 760. The median age was 50.6 years. 18.9% of residents were under the age of 18 and 27.8% of residents were 65 years of age or older. For every 100 females there were 104.9 males, and for every 100 females age 18 and over there were 105.3 males age 18 and over.

The racial makeup of the county was 63.2% White, 1.1% Black or African American, <0.1% American Indian and Alaska Native, 0.7% Asian, <0.1% Native Hawaiian and Pacific Islander, 20.1% from some other race, and 15.0% from two or more races. Hispanic or Latino residents of any race comprised 48.7% of the population.

<0.1% of residents lived in urban areas, while 100.0% lived in rural areas.

There were 348 households in the county, of which 29.9% had children under the age of 18 living in them. Of all households, 42.0% were married-couple households, 23.0% were households with a male householder and no spouse or partner present, and 27.9% were households with a female householder and no spouse or partner present. About 31.0% of all households were made up of individuals and 17.6% had someone living alone who was 65 years of age or older.

There were 650 housing units, of which 46.5% were vacant. Among occupied housing units, 73.9% were owner-occupied and 26.1% were renter-occupied. The homeowner vacancy rate was 5.8% and the rental vacancy rate was 39.7%.

=== 2010 census ===
As of the census of 2010, 984 people, 443 households, and 295 families resided in the county. The population density was less than 1/km^{2} (2.6/mi^{2}). The 991 housing units averaged less than 1 per square mile (0.39/km^{2}). About 84.1% of the population were White, 0.9% Native American, 0.7% Black or African American, 0.4% Asian, 12.3% of some other race and 1.5% of two or more races; 47.5% were Hispanic or Latino (of any race).

Of the 443 households, 29.80% had children under the age of 18 living with them, 54.40% were married couples living together, 7.40% had a female householder with no husband present, and 33.40% were not families. About 31.80% of all households were made up of individuals, and 16.30% had someone living alone who was 65 years of age or older. The average household size was 2.44 and the average family size was 3.09.

In the county, the population was distributed as 26.50% under the age of 18, 5.00% from 18 to 24, 23.40% from 25 to 44, 27.50% from 45 to 64, and 17.60% who were 65 years of age or older. The median age was 42 years. For every 100 females, there were 103.20 males. For every 100 females age 18 and over, there were 101.50 males.

The median income for a household in the county was $24,219, and for a family was $28,906. Males had a median income of $21,429 versus $15,804 for females. The per capita income for the county was $13,721. About 21.20% of families and 25.20% of the population were below the poverty line, including 31.40% of those under age 18 and 31.10% of those age 65 or over.

== Communities ==
- Dryden
- Sanderson (county seat)

=== Former Communities ===
- Cedar Station

== Politics ==
United States presidential election results for Terrell County, Texas
Year	Republican		Democratic		Third party(ies)	
Year	No.	%	No.	%	No.	%
1912	36	18.37%	118	60.20%	42	21.43%
1916	59	24.38%	181	74.79%	2	0.83%
1920	95	35.45%	155	57.84%	18	6.72%
1924	122	38.61%	109	34.49%	85	26.90%
1928	364	80.71%	85	18.85%	2	0.44%
1932	133	21.70%	479	78.14%	1	0.16%
1936	84	20.59%	324	79.41%	0	0.00%
1940	133	24.18%	417	75.82%	0	0.00%
1944	156	30.95%	329	65.28%	19	3.77%
1948	78	29.43%	171	64.53%	16	6.04%
1952	426	59.00%	295	40.86%	1	0.14%
1956	350	61.51%	217	38.14%	2	0.35%
1960	291	45.05%	352	54.49%	3	0.46%
1964	294	44.68%	364	55.32%	0	0.00%
1968	250	41.60%	201	33.44%	150	24.96%
1972	467	79.02%	124	20.98%	0	0.00%
1976	317	49.38%	321	50.00%	4	0.62%
1980	411	59.91%	260	37.90%	15	2.19%
1984	407	58.31%	289	41.40%	2	0.29%
1988	296	42.96%	390	56.60%	3	0.44%
1992	176	27.89%	325	51.51%	130	20.60%
1996	185	35.65%	278	53.56%	56	10.79%
2000	243	50.94%	219	45.91%	15	3.14%
2004	306	65.25%	159	33.90%	4	0.85%
2008	323	62.24%	186	35.84%	10	1.93%
2012	358	64.50%	184	33.15%	13	2.34%
2016	288	65.75%	140	31.96%	10	2.28%
2020	334	72.93%	119	25.98%	5	1.09%
2024	314	77.53%	91	22.47%	0	0.00%

United States Senate election results for Terrell County, Texas1
Year	Republican		Democratic		Third party(ies)	
Year	No.	%	No.	%	No.	%
2024	301	75.25%	92	23.00%	7	1.75%

United States Senate election results for Terrell County, Texas2
Year	Republican		Democratic		Third party(ies)	
Year	No.	%	No.	%	No.	%
2020	324	72.00%	116	25.78%	10	2.22%

Texas Gubernatorial election results for Terrell County
Year	Republican		Democratic		Third party(ies)	
Year	No.	%	No.	%	No.	%
2022	326	76.53%	94	22.07%	6	1.41%

County Offices
County Judge	Dale Carruthers
Attorney	Kenneth D. Bellah
Clerk	Raeline Thompson
Treasurer	Rebecca Luevano
Tax Assessor-Collector	Thad Cleveland
Sheriff	Thad Cleveland
Justice of the Peace Precinct 1 and 2	Corina Arredondo
Justice of the Peace Precinct 3 and 4	Kelli Ellis

== See also ==
- National Register of Historic Places listings in Terrell County, Texas
- Recorded Texas Historic Landmarks in Terrell County
- USS Terrell County (LST-1157)
