= Mr. Horn =

1979 TV film

- Film poster
- Genre: Western
- Written by: William Goldman
- Directed by: Jack Starrett
- Starring: David Carradine; Richard Widmark; Karen Black
- Music by: Jerry Fielding
- Country of origin: United States
- Original language: English

Production
- Executive producer: Lee Rich
- Producers: Robert L. Jacks; Elliott Kastner
- Production locations: Mexicali, Baja California Norte, Mexico
- Cinematography: Jorge Stahl Jr.
- Editor: Michael McCroskey
- Running time: 180 minutes
- Production company: Lorimar Productions

Original release
- Network: CBS
- Release: February 1 – February 3, 1979

Mr. Horn is a 1979 American Western miniseries based on Tom Horn's writings, starring David Carradine. It was directed by Jack Starrett from a screenplay by William Goldman. This version came out just prior to the 1980 feature film Tom Horn, which starred Steve McQueen.

== Plot ==
First Part.
Arizona, 1885. Al Sieber arrives at a cowboy camp asking for Tom Horn, finds the scruffy young man trick roping, and hires him to be his assistant. While they travel, drinking, chatting and singing, Sieber insists on calling Tom "Mr. Horn," and they become friends. Next day, they wake up to find themselves surrounded by Apache. A young brave gives a message, which the "Talking Boy" Horn interprets: Geronimo warns "Man of Iron" Sieber to not chase him, or he will have to kill the scout. Sieber answers it is his job to do it.

Later, they meet a Cavalry patrol commanded by Lieutenant Lawton, which is en route to engage Geronimo, guided by two Apache whom Sieber recognizes as the chief's closest friends. Sieber tells the inexperienced Horn to stay with Mr. Mickey Free, a crazy-looking Apache scout, and to do the same that he does. Soon, as Sieber expected, the platoon falls into a trap. Instead of doing as ordered, Horn chases the Apache guides up to a hill, clubs them with his rifle, takes a vantage point, and shoots several braves, forcing them to retreat. Sieber praises Horn's initiative, but tells him he knows about his bad reputation. Tom confesses he doesn't know why people don't like him.

At Fort Bowie, General Crook praises Horn's actions and requests Sieber to bring him Geronimo, to which Sieber replies he can't do it, as Geronimo will surrender only when he wants to; Crook informs them he is about to be replaced by General Miles, what Siebert laments. Later in the night, while they are drinking, Sieber tells stories about their soon-to-return commanding officer, his old friend Captain Emmet Crawford, expecting him to be a colonel already.

The following day, Sieber introduces Horn to Crawford and talks jokingly about the captain's ample experience. Crawford leaves in a huff. Later, Crawford explains that a time ago he had an argument with a general, before witnesses, and made the mistake of being right, so he has been passed over for promotion ever since.

They enter Sonora, Mexico. Sieber proposes the scouts' trio go to the mountains while the troopers continue to the south. After a long search, they find an Apache camp in which there are only old men, women, and children: Sieber orders Free to burn it, which he does gladly. While the Apache people watch impotent, a saddened Sieber explains to a bemused Horn the enmities between Apache tribes, and that his job is to punish Geronimo into surrendering. Horn asks why the chief has to surrender, as that land is his own country. Sieber has no answer, and tells Horn to say to the Apache group that he is sorry.

Later, the troopers and the scouts are resting and eating together with the Apache prisoners; Lawton reproaches Horn for his respectful treatment of the Indians. They don't notice they are surrounded by Mexican soldiers until these ones start shooting. Crawford goes in full view identifying himself as an American officer, followed by Horn, who interprets his words into Spanish. Once they explain they are chasing Geronimo, the Mexicans excuse themselves for their mistake, but nobody lowers their guns. An American cocks his rifle, a Mexican shoots, Crawford is hit, and a battle ensues, including Mexican cannons. Horn is wounded too, yet he braves the fire to rescue the captain, who after two shots is still alive; he later dies. Sieber attempts to go around a hill to shoot the Mexican artillerymen from behind but is captured. A cease-fire follows, in which the Mexicans propose to exchange all the American mules for Sieber. Led by Horn, the Americans capture the six Mexicans who had gone for the animals, and he proposes to exchange them (plus some mules) for Sieber. The Mexicans accept it and retreat.

Back at Fort Bowie, Gen. Miles arrives. He demonstrates the heliograph he brought, trusting the modern device will be the key to capturing Geronimo; therefore, he fires all the civilian scouts. Sieber proposes Horn prospect mines and get rich, which means they dig a huge hole under the scorching sun, while drinking and chatting. Sieber boasts he discovered a very productive copper mine; Horn rapidly realizes he sold it cheap and didn't get any wealth from it.

They see Lt. Lawton coming, and believe they are being called back to scouting, but the officer is only escorting Miss Ernestina Crawford, sister to the late Capt. Crawford. She thanks Sieber for having been her brother's friend, and asks how he died. Horn lies saying it was just one painless gunshot.

Meanwhile, the Apache have figured out how the heliographs work, mimic them with mirrors, and start to counterattack. After a particularly deadly ambush, Gen. Miles sends the now Captain Lawton to a brothel to bring the scouts back, and orders them to get Geronimo.

Tom gets interested in Ernestina, and practices trick roping for her to see. Later, he visits her. Ernestina thanks Tom for helping her brother despite having barely known him. They end up in bed together. She confesses she is going to marry a dull civilian contractor because she has seen enough sudden death with her military father and brother, and all she wants is a man who outlives her. Then, they make love.

The Cavalry troop and its civilian scouts depart Fort Bowie. After a long time, they catch Geronimo's trail, which splits in two. Sieber leaves to Horn to decide which one to follow, Horn goes for the third direction. That night an Apache attack directed at Sieber happens; Horn saves his life, but the old scout gets wounded. The next day is clear he is unable to continue, so he puts Horn in charge, advises him to kill himself if he gets captured by the Apache, and goes back to the fort, helped by Mr. Free.

A long and exhausting persecution ensues; the Cavalry doesn't rest unless Geronimo does, and the Apache chief doesn't rest either. Both Apache braves and cavalrymen die from exhaustion and skirmishes; they lose track of time to the point they don't know what month it is, and still cannot capture Geronimo. Horn ventures alone into the hills, until some Apache find him; he takes off his guns. The Apache take Horn to see their leader.

Second Part.
In their conversation, Geronimo tells Horn he wasn't originally a warrior, but instead he led a life of quiet. Then the whites came and killed his entire family. Geronimo argues the injustice of the Apache being persecuted and murdered by the whites, how can Horn ask him to surrender to such people? Horn says it isn't a matter of justice: the whites have five thousand warriors whereas Geronimo only has eleven men left. Horn tells Geronimo he can still live in peace, and stay in his Arizona reservation; he gives his word on it to the Apache chief.

At Fort Bowie, there is a public ceremony in which Capt. Lawton congratulates Gen. Miles for capturing Geronimo, not even mentioning Horn's labor. Sieber, who is on crutches, is indignant, but Horn is indifferent until Gen. Miles declares that all the Apache will be sent to Florida. While Sieber protests that sending desert people to swamp land means killing them, Horn runs toward the cage wagon in which a despondent Geronimo and other Apache are being hauled but he is overcome and knocked out by troopers. Sieber stares desolately as the wagon goes away, carrying a wailing Mickey Free in it.

That night, Sieber visits Horn in jail, bringing him alcohol and the news that he'll be freed soon. Sieber proposes they work together in mining, with an equal share. Horn refuses, shouting that nothing is fair, that Sieber will get used by someone and have his mine taken away, and that he himself is done with being used. He drinks the whole bottle, and before a worried Sieber he trashes the cell in fury and despair. Later, Horn leaves the fort, alone.

Cheyenne, Wyoming, 1901. A well-dressed, mustachioed Tom Horn arrives at a boarding house seeking a room; the landlady is Ernestina, who he doesn't recognize. After she tells him she is a widow now and reminds him of the relationship they once had, he apologizes, and the old flame rekindles. They have a short conversation, as he has an appointment at the Cheyenne Club. While Horn is out, Sheriff Ed Smalley visits Ernestina and asks her about Horn's intentions, fearing what a man of such a reputation as Horn's has been called to do regarding the cattle rustling situation.

At the Club, Mr. John Noble offers Horn a large cup of brandy and introduces his wealthy and important companions. Horn understands they want a bounty hunter, Noble denies it: they want a detective. The cattlemen are aware of his career, and also that he is a drunkard, so they aren't certain whether he can handle their needs. Horn makes an on-the-spot demonstration of his marksmanship, boasting he cleaned North Colorado from rustlers. After more shooting, he leaves. Pleased, Noble says to the clubmen they found the right man.

Horn arrives at a saloon, where some men recognize and provoke him. Horn threatens to kill them all, and the men back down and leave. A man who is drinking at a table calls Horn: is the ex-Gen. Crook. He praises Horn's ascension, whereas he himself is now an itinerant lecturer who tells children about the Indian Wars, remarking that the incompetent Miles and Lawton became a politician and a general respectively. That night, a very drunk Tom boasts to Ernestina he defied four men to a duel when he had no bullets left in his gun, certain they wouldn't dare to face him.

By day, Horn visits the ranch of the same four men from the saloon, sees their cattle has other people's brands and tells them they are going to be trialed as rustlers. But, later at the court, the judge dismisses the case for "insufficient evidence." The rustlers leave laughing at a frustrated Horn. Back at the Club, Noble admits the cattlemen do want a bounty hunter, but as he is a lawyer, if ever Horn tells something about their deal he'll absolutely deny it. They agree on a payment of $700 for each rustler killed, and Horn gives his word he won't tell anything. Later, he starts a series of small nocturnal attacks on rustlers to frighten them so they leave, which are mostly unsuccessful.

At home, Ernestina asks Tom whether it is true he has killed a hundred men. He replies that "the more people think he has done, the less he has to do." After revealing to her a traumatic event of his past, Horn departs for a nocturnal incursion, in which he kills several rustlers, leaving their bodies lined in full view, with rocks under their heads. Some time later, while Tom is strolling in the city with Ernestina and her young daughter Mandy, Marshall Joe Lefors approaches them, and after exchanging some pleasantries invites his old friend Tom to a drinking contest, later that day.

At their homestead, the Nickells are working when in broad daylight shots are fired at them; when fire ceases, they find their young son Willie shot and dead on the ground, with a rock under his head.

At the saloon, Horn and Lefors drink, laugh, chat about how many people Horn has killed. Lefors invites the very drunk Horn to his place, where he has better liquor. Later, Smalley arrives at Horn's room to wake up and arrest him. Noble visits Horn in the jail; Horn makes it clear he won't tell on him. Relieved, Noble offers him his legal counsel.

The trial starts, before a large audience. The harrowing testimonies of the Nickells start turning the public and jury against Horn. Back at the jail, Smalley allows Ernestina to visit him; she warns Tom he is being railroaded, as the rustlers hate him and the cattlemen fear him telling people about who hired him. Tom doesn't believe it, so he kisses and caresses her, much to Smalley's chagrin.

The trial continues with the testimony of Deputy Snow, a stenographer who says he took accurate notes of the conversation Horn and Lefors had in the latter's room. When a nervous Lefors reads to the court Horn's alleged words of him charging $100 for each killing as average, putting a rock under the boy's head as his sign to collect the money, and shooting the boy from 300 yards of distance, making that his "best shot and dirtiest trick," the audience erupts in indignation. Not even the heartfelt but rambling testimony of an aging Sieber, called as a character witness, is enough to change the people's opinion.

Horn testifies. Not naming his employers, he acknowledges he did say that the rocks were a sign, but there was no reason for him to ambush and kill a baby. Then, Tom looks around at the people and says: "I don't know what else to tell you. I didn't do it. I didn't do it. I didn't."

Later, from his cell's window, Horn watches the "Julian Gallows" being tested; Smalley apologetically informs him he has 16 hours left to live. When a deputy brings him food, Horn gets his gun and escapes; Smalley pursues him. Finally, the lawman follows the fugitive into a stable, where Horn easily disarms him. He is about to run away, but the sheriff warns him: from now on he'll be forced to kill innocent men, starting with himself, following with the innocent men outside, and keep running forever, because in the end there are millions of them, but only one of him. Tom screams in despair, but then he calms down, leaves the guns, and after a failed attempt at trick roping, goes back to his cell. That night, Sieber visits him, and they spend the time drinking and chatting, almost as how they did in the old times.

Horn presents himself to his execution in the prison's yard wearing his best clothes. He gives Smalley the rope he had been braiding, asks Sieber to sing their favorite song "Life's Railway to Heaven" and climbs the gallows' steps firmly. At home, Ernestina and her daughter are singing the same hymn, and at the Club, the cattlemen drink and talk business. When Tom is tied up, he requests to be turned around to face the numerous attendance of newspapermen, sheriffs, marshalls, doctors, politicians, the judge and the prosecutor. Then Tom Horn waits calmly, looking defiantly at the "bastards" until the hydraulic contraption finally opens the trap.

== Cast ==
- David Carradine as Tom Horn
- Richard Widmark as Albert Sieber
- Karen Black as Ernestina Crawford
- Richard Masur as Sheriff Ed Smalley
- Clay Tanner as Lieutenant Henry Lawton
- Pat McCormick as Mr. John Noble
- Jack Starrett as General George Crook
- John Durren as Marshall Joe Lefors
- Jeremy Slate as Captain Emmet Crawford
- Enrique Lucero as Geronimo
- Stafford Morgan as General Nelson Miles
- Don Collier as Mr. Nickell
- James Oliver as Mickey Free

== Production ==
William Goldman had come across the story of Tom Horn while researching that of Butch Cassidy and became fascinated with him, calling Horn "the most talented man who ever lived" in the Wild West, deciding to write a screenplay about him. In 1974 it was announced Goldman, Robert Redford and Sydney Pollack had formed a company, the Horn Company, to make the movie. " Like Jeremiah [Johnson], the script is very mythic", said Pollack. Goldman was reportedly paid $500,000 for his work.

In 1977 Mike Medavoy at United Artists announced he had bought William Goldman's script to star Redford. Pollack was still attached and he got David Rayfiel to rewrite the script. Around this time it was announced that Steve McQueen had been developing his own Tom Horn movie.

Walter Coblenz was assigned to produce. "He is a hero of Western lore", said the producer. "Our picture will be very much about the man, his life and times. This is a distinct personality, the last of a breed, a man who was there in the last days of the real west. When he died, a good part of that life also died forever."

However Redford then dropped out of the project. The script was acquired by Lorimar Productions to be made for CBS. Robert Jacks, who produced, later said:

What we had was a very expensive William Goldman script. If it was done as a movie it would take $12 million and 95 days of shooting. We did it for a third of that and on a 50 day schedule. It was a long script, and we had to cut 50 minutes out of the first part ... It's really better suited for television ... I feel David Carradine was born to play Tom Horn. The similarity between their characters is incredible.

According to Goldman, the writer left the project by the time it went to Lorimar. He added:

Somebody timed it, which I had never done, and it came out to be three hours and twenty minutes — which is why I think someone said, "Wait a minute — that's a four-hour television movie." At one time a director was sent in to work with me, but then he got another job, and I never talked with the guy who eventually directed it.

=== Shooting ===
Filming took place on location in Mexico, starting July 1978, near Mexicali and Tecate.

== Reception ==
The Los Angeles Times called Goldman's script "spare and witty and wonderful" and the movie "marvelous". The New York Times called it a "neat, extremely absorbing flick."

William Goldman later admitted he never saw the miniseries. "Couldn't bring myself to...this was one of my bad experiences."

Goldman's script was adapted into a novel by Donald R. Bensen and published as William Goldman's Mr. Horn in two editions:

- New York, Dell Publishing, 1978, ISBN 9780440151944
- London, Coronet Books, 1979, ISBN 0 340 24652 9

== Historical accuracy ==
The script takes many liberties in relation to documented history, mainly by aggrandizing Horn's acting in the events, and by eliminating some people who greatly participated in them, like Lt. Maus in the battle that led to Capt. Crawford's death, Lt. Gatewood in Geronimo's surrender (1886), or like Jim McCloud, the inmate who started Horn's failed attempt at escape from prison. Other characters misrepresent the historical ones: Gen. Miles and Lt. Lawton appear as utterly incompetent, whereas their historical actions show otherwise. Even if the Cavalry's Apache scouts were indeed sent to Florida after Geronimo's surrender, Mickey Free (who was of Mexican ethnicity) was not; as for Al Sieber, he was a much younger German immigrant who did mentor Tom Horn, but remained as Chief of Scouts after 1886 and wasn't present at his trial and execution.

Even if most of the secondary characters match the historical ones, the slippery Mr. John Noble stands in the place of the historical John C. Coble, who not only defended Horn in the trial with a team of lawyers, but housed him and became his friend, made a final appeal for his life to Governor Chatterton, was his last visitor and even paid for his funeral. Karen Black's character of Ernestina Crawford is fictitious, and replaces Horn's alleged girlfriend, the teacher Glendolene Kimmell. Gen. Crook's last appearance in the miniseries happens after the point he historically died.

However, there is an effort to portray the times accurately in terms of mise-en-scène, like in costume, noting the existence of the Cheyenne Club, that at the time there were cars already, and also showing the ethical dilemmas faced by the characters in relation to the Apache Wars. David Carradine's characterization closely matches the historical Tom Horn both physically, in his cowboy skills like braiding ropes, as much in his drinking binges. Several of the character's lines are taken from Horn's autobiography (which is itself of controversial accuracy) with different degrees of exactitude; for example, the reasons he uses to convince Geronimo to surrender were said by Al Sieber on a previous occasion, and his last words were not the historical ones but appear in a letter Horn wrote to John C. Coble three days before his execution. Even if the script presents him as certainly innocent of the Nickell boy's murder (which is a matter of debate), it leaves clear the historical fact that Tom Horn had been hired as a killer and was both effective and a braggart in regards to that.
