= Tom Horn =

American outlaw

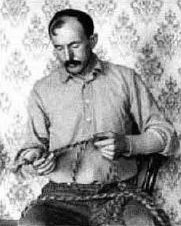
- Tom Horn at Work (Note: During his incarceration, Horn was a busy prisoner and spent much of his time braiding hair ropes. He was engaged at the task when the "News" photographer obtained the above snapshot of him.)
- Born: Thomas Horn Jr. November 21, 1861; Scotland County, Missouri, U.S.
- Died: November 20, 1903 (aged 41); Cheyenne, Wyoming, U.S.
- Cause of death: Execution by hanging
- Resting place: Columbia Cemetery, Boulder, Colorado
- Other names: Tom Hale; Tom Hicks
- Occupations: U.S. Army Scout, lawman, cowboy, detective, killer for hire
- Years active: 1876–1903
- Employer: Pinkerton Detective Agency
- Known for: Assisting in the capture of Geronimo; allegedly murdering Willie Nickell

Thomas Horn Jr., (November 21, 1861 – November 20, 1903) was an American cowboy, scout, soldier, range detective, rodeo performer, Pinkerton agent, and killer for hire in the 19th-century and early 20th-century American Old West. Believed to have committed 17 killings as a hired gunman throughout the West, Horn was convicted in 1902 of the murder of 14-year-old Willie Nickell near Iron Mountain, Wyoming. Willie was the son of sheep rancher Kels Nickell, who had been involved in a range feud with neighbor and cattle rancher Jim Miller. On the day before his 42nd birthday, Horn was executed by hanging in Cheyenne, Wyoming.

While in jail, he wrote his autobiography, which was published posthumously in 1904. Numerous editions have been published in the late 20th century. Horn has since become a larger-than-life figure of Western folklore, and debate continues as to whether he was actually guilty of Nickell's murder.

== Early life ==
Thomas Horn Jr., known as "Tom", was born in 1861 to Thomas S. Horn Sr. and Mary Ann Maricha (née Miller) on their family farm in rural northeastern Scotland County, Missouri. The family owned 600 acres bisected by the South Wyaconda River between the towns of Granger and Etna. Tom was the fifth of 12 children. During his childhood, he suffered physical abuse from his father, and his only companion as a child was a dog named Shedrick. The young Tom later got into a fight with two boys, who beat him and killed the dog with a shotgun.

== Scout ==
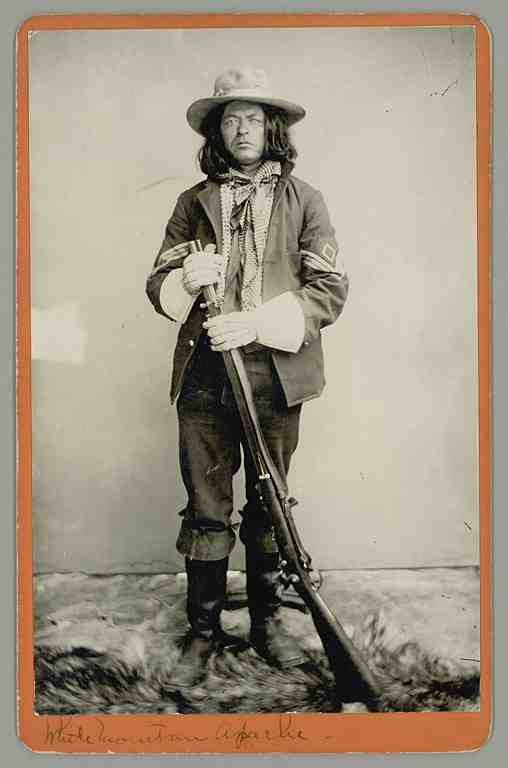
Mickey Free – Apache Indian Scout

At 16, Horn headed to the American Southwest, where he was hired by the U.S. Cavalry as a civilian scout, packer, and interpreter under Al Sieber during the Apache Wars. Horn was respected for his work with the army and soon rose through the ranks. In one instance, as the army was crossing Cibecue Creek in Arizona, they were ambushed by Apache warriors positioned on high ground. The officer in charge of their squad, Captain Edmund Hentig, was instantly killed, and the men became pinned down under overwhelming fire. Desperate, Sieber ordered Horn and another scout, Mickey Free, to break away and return fire from a hill. Together with the soldiers, the men repelled the attack. Horn and Sieber also participated in the Battle of Big Dry Wash and gained recognition when he and Lt. George H. Morgan slipped through the banks opposite the Apache line and provided covering fire for the cavalry, killing a number of Apache warriors.

Horn was a respected scout by then, known for going out alone in reconnaissance missions and helping track down Geronimo's major stronghold. By November 1885, Tom Horn earned the position of chief of scouts under Captain Emmet Crawford in Fort Bowie. During one operation, Horn's camp was mistakenly attacked by a Mexican militia, and he was wounded in the arm during the shootout, which also resulted in Crawford's death. Finally, on September 4, 1886, Horn was present at Geronimo's final surrender and acted as an interpreter under Charles B. Gatewood.

Horn allegedly killed his first non-native-American man, a second lieutenant in the Mexican Army, in a duel,, the result of a dispute over a prostitute.

After the war, Horn used what he earned to build his own ranch in his return to Aravaipa Canyon in Arizona. His ranch consisted of 100 cattle and 26 horses, and he also claimed property in the Deer Creek Mining District near the canyon. However, it was short-lived, as cattle thieves stormed his ranch one night and stole all his stock, resulting in a tremendous loss and bankruptcy for Horn. This incident marked the start of Horn's hatred and disdain for thieves, which led to his entering the profession of range detective.

== Detective, lawman, and gun for hire ==
Horn wandered and took jobs as a prospector, ranch hand, and rodeo contestant, but he is most notorious for being hired by numerous cattle companies as a cowboy and hired gun to watch over their cattle and kill any suspected rustlers. Horn developed his own means to fight thieves: "I would simply take the calf and such things as that stopped the stealing. I had more faith in getting the calf than in courts". If he thought a man was guilty of stealing cattle and had been fairly warned, Horn said that he would shoot the thief and would not feel "one shred of remorse".

Horn often gave a warning first to those he suspected of rustling and was said to have been a "tremendous presence" whenever he was in the vicinity. Fergie Mitchell, a rancher on the North Laramie River, described Horn's reputation: "I saw him ride by. He didn't stop, but went straight on up the creek in plain sight of everyone. All he wanted was to be seen, as his reputation was so great that his presence in a community had the desired effect. Within a week, three settlers in the neighborhood sold their holdings and moved out. That was the end of cattle rustling on the North Laramie".

Later, Horn took part in the Pleasant Valley War between cattlemen and sheepmen in Arizona. Historians have not established for which side he worked, and both sides suffered several killings for which no known suspects were ever identified. Horn worked on a ranch owned by Robert Bowen, where he became one of the prime suspects in the disappearance of Mart Blevins in 1887. He claimed that throughout the war he was the "mediator" of the conflict, serving as a deputy sheriff under three famous Arizona lawmen: Buckey O'Neill, Perry Owens, and Glenn Reynolds. Horn also participated with Reynolds in the lynching of three suspected rustlers in August 1888. As a deputy sheriff, Horn drew the attention of the Pinkerton National Detective Agency owing to his tracking abilities. Hired by the agency in late 1889 or early 1890, he handled investigations in the Rocky Mountains of Colorado, Wyoming, and other western states, working out of the Denver office. He became known for his calm under pressure and his ability to track down anyone assigned to him.

In one case, Horn and another agent, C.W. Shores, captured two men who had robbed the Denver and Rio Grande Western Railroad on August 31, 1890, between Cotopaxi and Texas Creek in Fremont County, Colorado. Horn and Shores tracked and arrested Thomas Eskridge—also known as "Peg-Leg" Watson—and Burt "Red" Curtis without firing a shot. They tracked them all the way to the home of a man named Wolfe, said to be in either Washita or Pauls Valley, Oklahoma, along the Washita River. In his report on that arrest, Horn stated in part, "Watson was considered by everyone in Colorado as a very desperate character. I had no trouble with him."

During the Johnson County War, Horn worked for the Wyoming Stock Growers Association and for the Pinkertons, who had assigned him to work undercover in the county using the alias Tom Hale. He is alleged to have been involved in the killing of Nate Champion and Nick Ray on April 9, 1892, and was a prime suspect in the killings of ranchers John A. Tisdale and Orley "Ranger" Jones. The Pinkerton Agency forced Horn to resign in 1894. In his memoir, Two Evil Isms: Pinkertonism and Anarchism, Pinkerton detective Charlie Siringo wrote, "William A. Pinkerton told me that Tom Horn was guilty of the crime, but that his people could not allow him to go to prison while in their employ". Siringo later indicated that he respected Horn's abilities at tracking and that he was a very talented agent, but had a wicked element. ] In 1895, Horn reportedly killed a known cattle thief named William Lewis near Iron Mountain, Wyoming. Horn was exonerated for that crime and for the 1895 murder of Fred Powell six weeks later. In 1896, a ranchman named Campbell, known to have a large stash of cash, was last seen with Horn. In 1896, Horn offered his service in a letter to the marshal of Tucson, Arizona, in getting rid of William Christian's rustler gang. William was killed by an unknown assailant in 1897, and his associate Robert Christian disappeared the same year.

=== Colorado Range War ===
Although his official title was "range detective", Horn essentially served as a killer for hire. By the mid-1890s, the cattle business in Wyoming and Colorado was changing due to the arrival of homesteaders and new ranchers. The homesteaders, referred to as "nesters" or "grangers" by the big operators, had moved into the territory in large numbers. By doing so, they reduced the availability of water and grazing for the larger herds of the cattle barons. Soon, efforts were made to get rid of these homesteaders, including the hiring of gunmen like Horn. Violent gunfights such as the bloody shootout that resulted in the death of nine trappers in Big Dry Creek (Littleton, Colorado), as well as the lynching and burning of homesteaders Luther M. Mitchell and Ami W. Ketchum, precipitated the Colorado Range War.

By 1900, Horn began working for the Swan Land and Cattle Company in northwest Colorado. His first job was to investigate the Browns Park Cattle Association's leader, a cowboy named Matt Rash, who was suspected of cattle rustling. Horn went undercover as "Tom Hicks" and worked for Rash as a ranch hand while also collecting evidence that Rash was branding cattle that did not belong to him. When Horn finally pieced together enough evidence to determine that Rash was indeed a rustler, he put a threatening letter on Rash's door saying that he must leave in 60 days. Rash, however, defiantly stayed and continued working on his ranch. As Rash remained uncooperative, Horn's employers were said to have given him the "go-ahead signal" to execute Rash. On the day of the murder, an armed Horn allegedly arrived at Rash's cabin just as he finished eating and shot him at point-blank range. The dying Rash unsuccessfully tried to write the name of his killer, but no trace was left of the murder. Only the accounts and rumors from various people point to Horn as the one responsible. Rash was supposed to be married to a nearby rancher, Ann Bassett, and the woman accused "Hicks" of being the murderer.

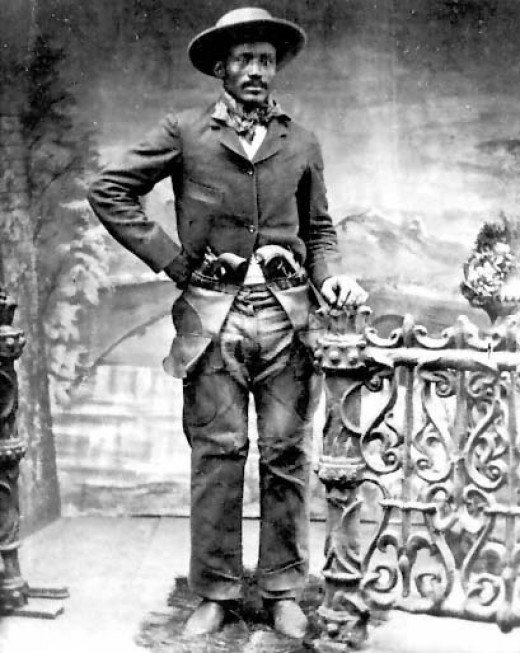
Ned Huddleston a.k.a. Isom Dart Brown's Hole, WY.

Around the same time, Horn also suspected another cowboy named Isom Dart of rustling. Dart was one of Rash's fellow cowboys but was believed to have previously worked as a rustler named Ned Huddleston and to have been a former member of the late "Tip Gault" gang. The gang, which had rustled cattle up in the Saratoga, Wyoming, area, had been wiped out in a gun battle. Dart also had three indictments returned against him in Sweetwater County. When Dart was accused of murdering Rash, he took refuge inside his friend's cabin and waited for the rumors to cool down. Horn, however, managed to track Dart to his cabin and saw him hiding together with two other armed associates.

The assassin was said to have set up a sniping position overlooking the cabin from a hill, under cover of a pine tree. As Dart and his friends came out of the cabin, Horn shot him in the chest from a distance. Prior to the assassination, Horn had instructed a rancher named Robert Hudler to ready a horse miles from the murder scene for his getaway. The next day, two spent .30-30 Winchester shell casings were found at the base of a tree where the murderer is believed to have lain in wait. "Hicks" was said to be the only one in the area to use a .30–30 rifle. The news of Rash and Dart's deaths spread throughout the territory, causing the other rustlers to scatter in fear. Horn tracked them all down and killed three other members of Rash's association. The story goes that he pinned one of the dead cowboys' ears for the homesteaders to see as a warning.

=== Government employment ===
During the Wilcox train robbery investigation, Horn obtained information from Bill Speck that revealed which of the outlaws, George Curry or Harvey Logan, had killed Sheriff Josiah Hazen during their escape. Both were members of Butch Cassidy's Wild Bunch, then known as the Hole-in-the-Wall Gang, so named after their hideaway in the mountains. Horn passed this information on to Charlie Siringo, who was working the case for the Pinkertons.

Horn briefly entered the United States Army to serve during the Spanish–American War as the chief packer of the Fifth Corps. He left Tampa for Cuba, where he led some of the pack trains to the front. Horn personally witnessed the bravery of the famous Rough Riders and colored regiments, the Ninth and Tenth Cavalries, during their assault on San Juan Hill, as well as the humiliating rout of American soldiers under Brigadier General Hamilton S. Hawkins. Although the packers were noncombatants, they were still prone to attack by Cuban rebels. Horn considered himself lucky to have lost no packer during the war, although Horn recalled that he and his men were under constant fire as they delivered rations and ammunition to the soldiers.

Horn continued working as a packer during the war, though he and many of his men contracted yellow fever. At one point, he was bedridden and was deemed unfit for combat. Upon recovering, he returned to Wyoming. Shortly after his return, Horn began working in 1901 for wealthy cattle baron John C. Coble, who belonged to the Wyoming Stock Men's Association.

== Murder of Willie Nickell ==
While working again near Iron Mountain, Wyoming, on July 15, 1901, Horn visited the Jim and Dora Miller family, who were cattle ranchers. Jim Miller was no relation to Texas outlaw Jim Miller. Jim Miller and his neighbor, Kels Nickell, had already had several disputes following Nickell's introduction of sheep into the Iron Mountain area. Miller frequently accused Nickell of letting his sheep graze on Miller's land. At the Millers, Horn met Glendolene M. Kimmell, the young teacher at the Iron Mountain School. Ms. Kimmell was supported by both the large Miller and Kels Nickell families, and she boarded with the Millers. Horn entertained her with accounts of his adventures. That day, some men from the Miller family and he went fishing; Victor Miller, a son about his age, and he also practiced shooting, both of them with .30-30 rifles.

The Miller and Nickell families were the only ones to have children at the school. Before she arrived, Kimmell had been advised of the families' ongoing feud and found that it was often played out by conflict among the children. A few days later, on July 18, Willie Nickell, the 14-year-old son of sheep ranchers Kels and Mary Nickell, was found murdered near their homestead gate. A coroner's inquest began to investigate the murder. More violent incidents occurred during the coroner's inquest, which was expanded to investigate these incidents and lasted from July through September 1901.

On August 4, Kels Nickell was shot and wounded. Some 60–80 of his sheep were found "shot or clubbed to death". Two of the younger Nickell children later reported seeing two men leaving on horses, one a bay and one gray, as were horses owned by Jim Miller. On August 6, Deputy Sheriff Peter Warlaumont and Deputy U.S. Marshal Joe LeFors came to Iron Mountain and arrested Jim Miller and his sons Victor and Gus on suspicion of shooting Kels Nickell. They were jailed on August 7 and released the following day on bond. The investigation of the shooting of Kels Nickell was added to the investigation of Willie Nickell's murder in the coroner's inquest.

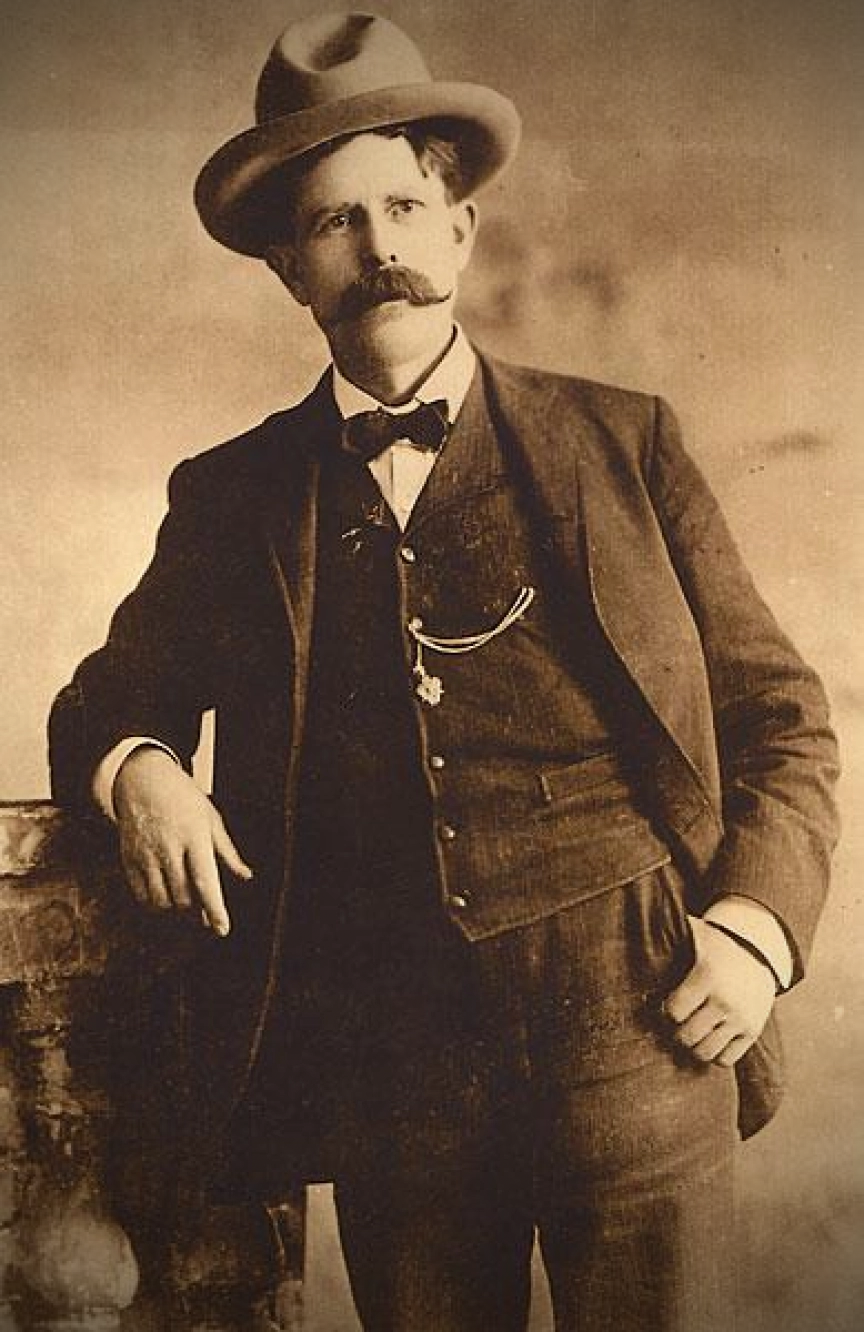
Deputy Marshal Joe Lefors

Deputy Marshal Joe Lefors later questioned Horn in January 1902 about the murder while supposedly talking to him about employment. Horn was still inebriated from the night before, but Lefors gained what he called a confession to the murder of Willie Nickell. Horn allegedly confessed to killing young Willie with his rifle from 300 yards (270 m), which he boasted of as the "best shot that [he] ever made and the dirtiest trick that [he] had ever done". Horn was arrested the next day by the county sheriff. Walter Stoll was the Laramie County prosecutor in the case. Judge Richard H. Scott, who presided over the case, was running for re-election.

"LeFors suspected Horn was the murderer and devised a scheme to trap him. Luring the cowboy into his Cheyenne office with the promise of a (phony) job offer from cattlemen in Montana looking for some illicit muscle, LeFors manipulated Horn into a booze-fueled conversation about his very particular set of skills. What Horn didn't know was that in an adjacent room, LeFors had stationed a credible witness and a court stenographer to transcribe the conversation."

Horn was supported by his longtime friend and employer, cattle rancher John C. Coble. He gathered a defense team headed by former Judge John W. Lacey, and which included attorneys T. F. Burke, Roderick N. Matson, Edward T. Clark, and T. Blake Kennedy. Reportedly, Coble covered the costs of this large team. According to Johan P. Bakker, who wrote Tracking Tom Horn, the large cattle interests by this time found Horn "expendable", and the case provided a way to silence him in regard to their activities. He wrote that 100 members of the Wyoming Stock Growers Association paid $1000 each toward the defense, but wanted a minimal effort.

Horn's trial began on October 10, 1902, in Cheyenne, which was filled with crowds drawn by Horn's notoriety. The Rocky Mountain News noted the carnival atmosphere and public interest in a conviction. The prosecution introduced Horn's confession to Lefors. Only certain parts of Horn's statement were introduced, distorting his statement. The prosecution introduced testimony by at least two witnesses, including Lefors, as well as circumstantial evidence; these elements only placed Horn in the general vicinity of the crime scene. During the trial, Victor Miller testified that Horn and he both had .30-30 guns and bought their ammunition at the same store. Another, Otto Plaga, testified that Horn was 20 miles (30 km) from the scene of the murder an hour after it was committed; however, prosecuting attorney Walter Stoll was able to lead Horn into boasting on the stand that he could have ridden that distance in an hour, undermining his alibi.

Glendolene Kimmell testified during the coroner's inquest, stating that she thought both the Miller and Nickell families were responsible for maintaining the feud, but she was never called as a defense witness. She resigned from the school in October 1901 and left the area, but remained in contact with people in the case. Horn's trial went to the jury on October 23, and they returned a guilty verdict the next day. A hearing several days later sentenced Horn to death by hanging. Horn's attorneys filed a petition with the Wyoming Supreme Court for a new trial. While in jail, Horn wrote his autobiography, Life of Tom Horn, Government Scout and Interpreter, Written by Himself, mostly giving an account of his early life. It contained little about the case.

The Wyoming Supreme Court affirmed the District Court decision and denied a new trial. Convinced of Horn's innocence, Glendolene Kimmell sent an affidavit to Governor Fenimore Chatterton with testimony reportedly saying that Victor Miller was guilty of Nickell's murder. Accounts of its contents appeared in the press, but the original document has since disappeared. The governor chose not to intervene in the case. Horn was initially given an execution date of November 20, 1903.

== Execution ==
Tom Horn was one of the few people in the "Wild West" to have been hanged by a water-powered gallows, known as the "Julian" gallows. James P. Julian, a Cheyenne, Wyoming architect, designed the contraption in 1892. The trap door was connected to a lever that pulled the plug out of a barrel of water. This would cause a lever with a counterweight to rise, withdrawing a support and opening the trap.

Horn was hanged in Cheyenne. At that time, Horn never gave up the names of those who had hired him during the feud. He was buried in the Columbia Cemetery in Boulder, Colorado, on December 3, 1903. Rancher John C. Coble paid for his coffin and a stone to mark his grave. After his death, many considered Horn to have been wrongly executed for a murder solely based on a purported confession given when drunk, thus of dubious admissibility in court. Even the old Apache warrior, Geronimo, expressed his doubts about Horn's charges during an interview with Charles Ackenhausen, saying that he "did not believe [Horn] guilty".

== Debate ==
The debate over Horn's guilt remains as divided to this day. The consensus is that regardless of whether Horn committed that particular murder, he had certainly committed many others—a concession to probability, but not an affirmation of guilt.

Author Chip Carlson of Cheyenne, Wyoming, who extensively researched the Wyoming v. Tom Horn trial, concluded that although Horn could have committed the murder of Willie Nickell, he probably did not. According to his book, Tom Horn: Blood on the Moon (2001), no physical evidence showed that Horn had committed the murder. In addition, he was last seen in the area the day before it occurred, and the conditions of his alleged confession rendered it valueless as evidence. Carlson believed the prosecution made no efforts to investigate other possible suspects, including Victor Miller. In essence, Horn's reputation and history made him an easy target for the prosecution.

The case was retried in a mock trial in 1993 in Cheyenne, and Horn was acquitted.

Writer Dean Fenton Krakel believed that Horn was guilty, but that he had not realized he was shooting a boy.

In 2014, former professor of history at Arkansas State University Larry Ball published Tom Horn in Life and Legend, asserting the opinion that Horn was responsible for the murder. Ball maintains that he found no evidence of a legal conspiracy against Horn, arguing that Horn's penchant for brutality contributed to his being convicted of the crime.

== Representation in movies and television ==
- Horn was played by Hollywood star George Montgomery in the 1950 film Dakota Lil.
- In 1954, Louis Jean Heydt played Tom Horn in an episode of the syndicated television series Stories of the Century.
- In 1959, Les Johnson played Tom Horn in an episode of the TV series Tales of Wells Fargo, (season four, episode eight, "Tom Horn").
- In 1959, Gregg Palmer played Horn in the episode "Perilous Cargo" on the syndicated anthology series Death Valley Days, hosted by Stanley Andrews.
- In 1967, the film Fort Utah, a Western starring John Ireland as Horn, was released.
- Mr. Horn (1979) was a TV miniseries starring David Carradine as Tom Horn.
- Steve McQueen played Horn in the 1980 film Tom Horn. The end of the film depicts Horn's execution on the Julian Gallows.
- In December 2009, the History Channel aired the series Cowboys & Outlaws; the episode "Frontier Hitman" was about the life of Tom Horn.
- In 2014, American Heroes Channel's series Gunslingers featured an episode dedicated to Horn entitled "Tom Horn: Grim Reaper of the Rockies".
- Tom Horn was played by actor Chris Bauer along with Matthew Le Nevez as Bat Masterson in the 2015 Lifetime series The Lizzie Borden Chronicles.
- In 2017, actor Larry Poole portrayed Tom Horn in Once Guilty, Now Innocent, Still Dead.

== Bibliography ==
- Anderson, Dan; Yadon, Laurence (2007). 100 Oklahoma Outlaws, Gangsters, and Lawmen: 1839–1939. Pelican Publishing Company. p. 231. ISBN 978-1-58980-384-8.
- Bakker, Johan P. (1994). Tracking Tom Horn. Talking Boy.
- Ball, Larry D. (2014). Tom Horn in Life and Legend. University of Oklahoma Press. ISBN 978-0-8061-4425-2.
- Carlson, Chip (2001). Tom Horn – Blood on the Moon: Dark History of the Murderous Cattle Detective. Glendo, WY: High Plains Press. ISBN 978-0-9312-7159-5.
- Horn, Tom (February 15, 1973) [1904]. Life of Tom Horn, Government Scout and Interpreter, Written by Himself, Together with His Letters and Statements by His Friends: A Vindication. University of Oklahoma Press. ISBN 978-0-8061-1044-8.
- Krakel, Dean Fenton (1954). The Saga of Tom Horn: The Story of a Cattlemen's War, with personal narratives, newspaper accounts, and official documents and testimonies (2 ed.). Powder River Publishers.
- Monaghan, Jay (1997). Tom Horn: Last of the Bad Men. Bison Books. ISBN 978-0-8032-8234-6.
- Runkle, Benjamin (August 2, 2011). Wanted Dead or Alive: Manhunts from Geronimo to Bin Laden. Macmillan + ORM. ISBN 978-0-230-33891-3.
- Thrapp, Dan L. (1991). Encyclopedia of Frontier Biography. Vol. 1: A–F. University of Nebraska Press. p. 127. ISBN 978-0-8032-9418-9.
- Wilson, R. Michael (2008). Outlaw Tales of Wyoming: True Stories of the Cowboy State's Most Infamous Crooks, Culprits, and Cutthroats. Globe Pequot. p. 115. ISBN 978-0-7627-4506-7.
