= Butch and Sundance: The Early Days =

1979 film

- Theatrical release poster
- Directed by: Richard Lester
- Written by: Allan Burns
- Based on: Characters by William Goldman
- Produced by: Gabriel Katzka; Steven Bach
- Starring: William Katt; Tom Berenger
- Cinematography: László Kovács
- Edited by: George Trirogoff
- Music by: Patrick Williams
- Production companies: Pantheon; William Goldman
- Distributed by: 20th Century Fox
- Release date: June 15, 1979
- Running time: 111 minutes
- Country: United States
- Language: English
- Budget: $9 million
- Box office: $5.1 million (domestic)

Butch and Sundance: The Early Days is a 1979 American Western film and prequel to the 1969 film Butch Cassidy and the Sundance Kid. It stars Tom Berenger as Butch Cassidy and William Katt as the Sundance Kid, with Jeff Corey reprising his role as Sheriff Bledsoe.

It was directed by Richard Lester and written by Allan Burns. It generally received mixed reviews but was nominated for an Oscar for Best Costume Design.

The film is set in Wyoming. The outlaw Butch Cassidy finds a new partner-in-crime, but he has a stalker who wants him dead. The man is a former ally of Butch who is convinced that Butch betrayed their former gang.

== Plot ==
In Wyoming, wannabe outlaw Butch Cassidy joins forces with sharpshooter Harry Longabaugh (who renames himself the Sundance Kid) and they carry out a series of robberies. However, Butch is stalked by a member of his former gang, O.C. Hanks, who believes he betrayed the gang.

The two spend the winter in Telluride until they hear O.C. is in town, then rush away to deliver diphtheria serum to snowbound farms and become heroes. O.C. ambushes them and wounds Sundance by mistake. He recovers in Butch's home, tended by Butch's wife Mary and their two sons, who don't know their father's real job (he takes up butchery to earn money).

O.C. turns up for a showdown and Sundance unintentionally kills him. Returning to crime, the pair rob a bank and then decide to rob a money train guarded by cavalry, not knowing Butch has been promised an amnesty if he gives up crime. They get the money, free the cavalry horses to prevent pursuit, and ride away dreaming of being famous outlaws.

== Cast ==
- Tom Berenger as Butch Cassidy / Robert Leroy Parker
- William Katt as The Sundance Kid / Harry Alonzo Longabaugh
- Jeff Corey as Sheriff Ray Bledsoe
- John Schuck as Kid Curry / Harvey Logan
- Michael C. Gwynne as Mike Cassidy
- Peter Weller as Joe LeFors
- Brian Dennehy as O.C. Hanks
- Christopher Lloyd as Bill Tod Carver (billed as "Chris Lloyd")
- Jill Eikenberry as Mary Parker
- Joel Fluellen as Jack
- Regina Baff as Ruby
- Peter Brocco as Old Robber
- Vincent Schiavelli as Guard
- Hugh Gillin as Cyrus Antoon
- Sherril Lynn Rettino as Annie
- Elya Baskin as Book-keeper

== Production ==
Allan Burns worked on the script with William Goldman, who was on board as executive producer; Goldman added some scenes and moments he wanted to introduce in the first movie but the bulk of the script was Burns'.

William Katt had recently made First Love and was being called "a young Robert Redford" so ended up being cast as Sundance. Tom Berenger was cast after the studio were impressed by his performance in Looking for Mr. Goodbar.

Jeff Corey, portraying Sheriff Bledsoe, was the only actor to reprise his role from the original 1969 film.

Director Richard Lester stated he had never seen the first movie.

== Reception ==
=== Critical response ===
Roger Ebert gave the film 2.5 stars out of 4 and said it was "technically fine ... But as we listen to the freewheeling dialog, as we watch young Butch and the Kid blunder through their first adventures and finesse their later ones, there's a nagging question bouncing about in the backs of our heads: Why are we in this theater at this time? Did we want to know about the early days? Now that we're here, does the movie make us care? Not really." Gene Siskel of the Chicago Tribune also gave it 2.5 stars, writing that "Fox succeeded in getting the actors but failed to provide them with a really fine script. Which is not to say that 'Butch and Sundance: The Early Days' is a bad picture. On the contrary, it's pleasant enough, but that's about all." Vincent Canby of The New York Times called the film "so lifeless it's almost creepy ... You can't believe that Mr. Lester was in the same continent when it was made." Of the two leads Canby said, "There's nothing remarkably wrong about their performances but, for one reason or another, there's absolutely no rapport between them."

Variety wrote, "Tom Berenger and William Katt acquit themselves admirably, but simply can't compete with the ghosts of two superstars ... There are some patented Lester hijinks in the first half-hour of the prequel, but these peter out surprisingly soon. What's left is a mishmash of effective stuntwork and visuals, and a story line that moseys along with little suspense or excitement." Kevin Thomas of the Los Angeles Times called the film "pleasant though slight." Gary Arnold of The Washington Post declared it "the first attractive Western to mosey across the screen in several years. Not a great or even rousing Western, but at least a pleasant, warmly evocative one, beautifully visualized and incidentally enjoyable for its settings, texture, droll tone and sometimes amusing interplay of characters."

The film reportedly lost $4 million. "It was a terrible movie", said a retired Fox executive. "It was a parody of a satire and it was filmed by talentless people. Naturally it bombed.... It takes a lot of money to produce a western. It has to be shot on location. You need horses, a period town, costumes and other paraphernalia that a contemporary film such as 'Kramer vs. Kramer' doesn't require. That's why studios are reluctant to finance them."

Butch and Sundance: The Early Days holds a 33% rating on Rotten Tomatoes based on six reviews.

== Release ==
A DVD of the film was released by Anchor Bay Entertainment in February 2005. However, Anchor Bay has since lost distribution rights to the film and the DVD was forced to go out of print.

Shout! Factory acquired the rights to the film and released it on DVD as a double billing with Death Hunt on February 1, 2011.

It is currently available on Blu-ray through Timeless Media Group.
