= Joe Lefors =

American lawman (1865–1940)

Joseph Shelby Lefors
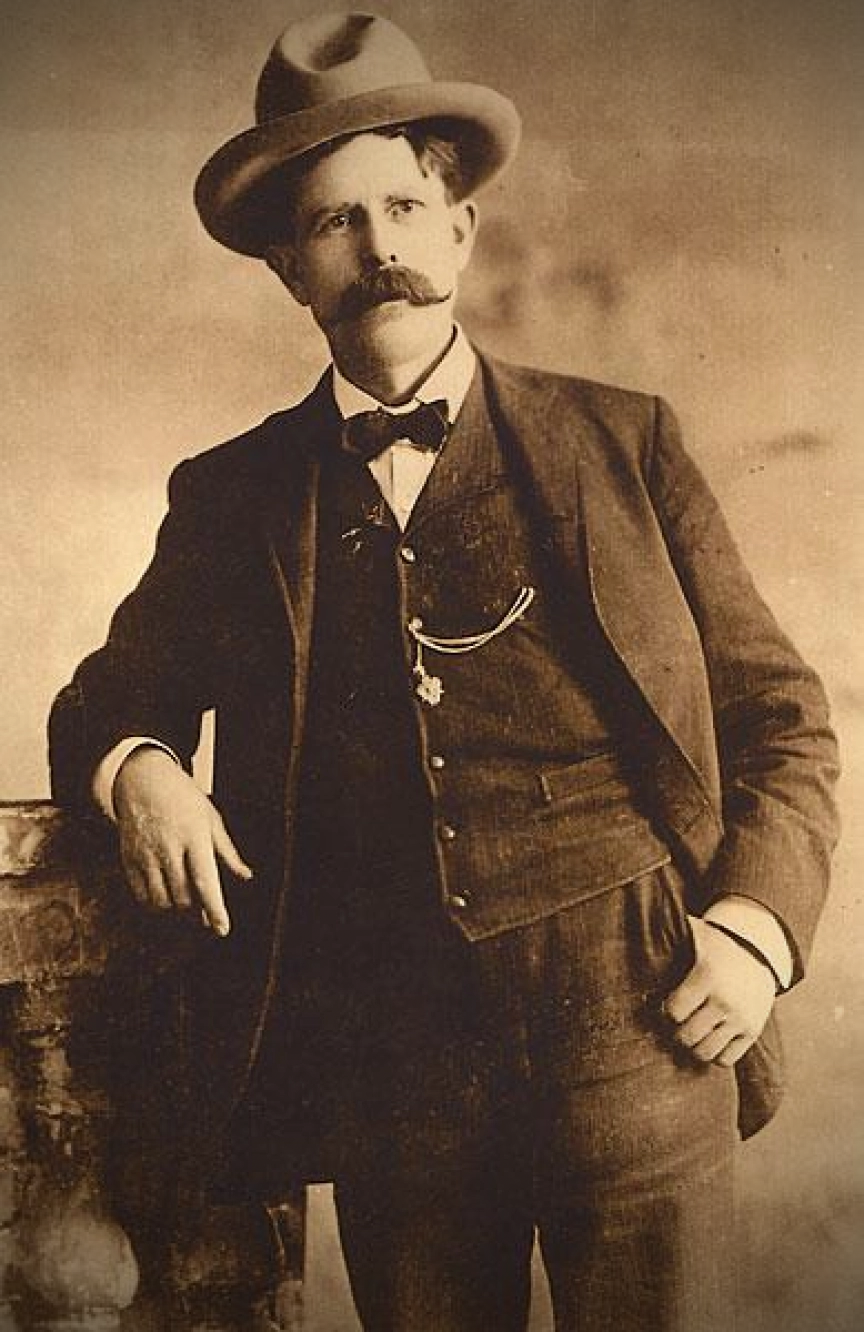
- Born: February 20, 1865; Paris, Texas, US
- Died: October 1, 1940 (aged 75); United States
- Occupation: Lawman

Joe Lefors (February 20, 1865 – October 1, 1940) was a lawman in the closing years of the Old West. He is best known for obtaining the confession that led to the conviction of gunman Tom Horn in 1903 for the alleged murder of 14-year-old sheepherder Willie Nickell.

Lefors was featured as a character in the 1969 film Butch Cassidy and the Sundance Kid, a role later portrayed by Peter Weller in the 1979 prequel Butch & Sundance: The Early Days.

== Family ==
Lefors was born in Paris, Texas, to James J. Lefors and Mahala West. His brothers Sam, Ike, Rufe, and Newton were all peace officers in some capacity. Newton was killed in the line of duty serving as a Deputy U.S. Marshal in Indian Territory. The town of Lefors, Texas is named for another brother, Perry.

== Law enforcement career ==
Lefors first arrived in Wyoming in 1885 after working on a cattle drive that ended there. He played a minor role in the 1887 recovery of a large herd of cattle rustled by the Hole in the Wall Gang. He later worked as a contract Wyoming Livestock Inspector where his job was to recover stolen livestock and apprehend cattle thieves. Lefors married his first wife, 16-year-old Bessie M. Hannum, in Newcastle, Wyoming on August 5, 1896.

In 1899, Lefors took part in a posse to capture those responsible for what would become known as the "Wilcox Train Robbery", committed by the Hole in the Wall Gang led by infamous outlaw Butch Cassidy. The robbers eventually escaped into the Big Horn Mountains. Famed lawman and Pinkerton Agent Charlie Siringo also worked extensively on the Wilcox Train Robbery case and would, years later, come into contact with Lefors in the process of working other cases. Siringo would later indicate that he believed Lefors to be incompetent at best as a lawman. However, U.S. Marshal Frank Hadsell appointed Lefors as a Deputy U.S. Marshal in October 1899. Lefors always claimed that Hadsell approached him to take that job based on his hard work on the Wilcox Robbery. However, no evidence shows that Lefors contributed to that case at all, and Lefors is not mentioned as a participant at all in the official records of that investigation. It may be that Lefors asked Hadsell to give him the appointment and eventually got it.

Thieves again robbed another Union Pacific train on August 29, 1900, near Tipton, Wyoming about fifty miles west of Rawlins, and this time Lefors led the posse. However, the posse again had no success and the robbers escaped. That same year, former lawman, scout, tracker and alleged killer for hire Tom Horn began his investigation of the Wilcox Robbery case; working on contract with the Pinkerton Detective Agency to solve the case. Horn generated productive information which he later passed to Charlie Siringo via the Agency and which he had obtained from explosives expert Bill Speck. Through that information, the investigators were able to establish that County Sheriff Josiah Hazen had been killed during a chase by the train robbery suspects. Horn and Siringo identified Hazen's killers as being Wild Bunch gang members George Curry and Kid Curry. Horn allegedly killed rustlers Matt Rash and Isom Dart that same month in his other job as a hired killer to fight cattle rustling for large cattle companies.

== Tom Horn ==
"LeFors suspected Horn was the murderer and devised a scheme to trap him. Luring the cowboy into his Cheyenne office with the promise of a (phony) job offer from cattlemen in Montana looking for some illicit muscle, LeFors manipulated Horn into a booze-fueled conversation about his very particular set of skills. What Horn didn't know was that in an adjacent room, LeFors had stationed a credible witness and a court stenographer to transcribe the conversation."

== Later life ==
Little is known about Lefors' life after Horn's hanging. He was known to brag to others about his achievements, though his effectiveness as a law enforcement official was disputed.

In a January 1, 1902, letter to W.D. Smith in Helena, Montana, of the "Iron Mountain Ranch Company", Lefors discussed the prospect of infiltrating a gang, though on behalf of the cattle company, rather than law enforcement. Smith asked Lefors to recommend someone for the job, which paid a salary of $125 per month, to which Lefors recommended himself, citing his successful defeat of "Brown's Hole Gang" as credentials. In fact, Lefors had been unsuccessful in stopping the activities of the "Brown's Hole Gang".

Following the hanging of Horn, Lefors took the job offered in Helena, working there for many months, without success in countering the gang. He was fired in 1904, and little is known about his whereabouts after that.

He started working on an autobiography in 1935, called Wyoming Peace Officer. It was published in 1953.

Joe Lefors died on October 1, 1940.
