= Richland Township, Tama County, Iowa =

Township in Tama County, Iowa, U.S.

Coordinates: 41°54′11″N 92°28′35″W

Location of Richland Township in Tama County

Richland Township is one of the twenty-one townships of Tama County, Iowa, United States.

== History ==
Richland Township was organized in 1854.

== Notable people ==
Harvey Logan (1867 – 1904), also known as "Kid Curry", was an American outlaw and gunman who rode with Butch Cassidy and the Sundance Kid's infamous Wild Bunch gang during the late 19th and early 20th centuries.
