= Lewis L. Gould =

American historian

Lewis Ludlow Gould (born September 21, 1939) is an American historian and author. He is Eugene C. Barker Centennial Professor Emeritus in American History at the University of Texas at Austin. A specialist on 20th century American political history, the history of the Republican Party, and presidential administrations since 1896, he pioneered the scholarly study of presidential spouses.

== Education and career ==
Gould was born September 21, 1939, in New York City. His father Jack Gould was television critic of The New York Times from 1947 to 1972. He took his A.B. from Brown University, in 1961, and his PhD in history from Yale University, in 1966. Howard R. Lamar directed his dissertation. He was an instructor and assistant professor at Yale, 1965-1967, then spent his career at the University of Texas at Austin. He became full professor in 1976 and was Eugene C. Barker Centennial Professor of American history, 1983-98. He chaired the History Department, 1980-84. He became professor emeritus in 1998. He was a visiting professor at Monmouth College. He married medievalist Karen D. Keel in 1970; she died in 2012. In May 2016 he married Jeanne Gittings Robeson. They live in Monmouth, Illinois.

His awards include National Endowment for the Humanities fellowship (1974), and Carr P. Collins Prize from the Texas Institute of Letters in 1974.

Gould in 1982 developed the nation's first course on presidential spouses. His research on Lady Bird Johnson demonstrated her impact on the environmental movement. In 1998 he launched a book series on "Modern First Ladies" for the University Press of Kansas. That led to his books: Lady Bird Johnson: Our Environmental First Lady (1999), Helen Taft: Our Musical First Lady (2010) and Edith Kermit Roosevelt: Creating the Modern First Lady (2012). In 2021 the First Ladies Association for Research and Education (FLARE) established an annual prize named after Gould in recognition of his pioneering scholarship on the historical role of First Ladies. Gould was also the first winner.

== Evaluations ==
Presidential Studies Quarterly stated in 2011: "Gould, the preeminent political historian of the Progressive Era, contributes new, original research and a provocative reinterpretation in Four Hats in the Ring, which is based on insights from his 40 years of research into the period."

The Journal of American History stated regarding the President Taft book: "The result is a balanced, fair assessment of the twenty-seventh president that will prove to be particularly valuable to those studying the early twentieth century. This study was long overdue....Gould's insight, conclusions, and presentation are all quite strong....[It] will prove to be the first volume that scholars who want to learn more about Taft will consult for years to come."

== Bibliography ==
- "A. S. Mercer and the Johnson County War: A Reappraisal." Arizona and the West 7.1 (1965): 5-20.
- Wyoming: A Political History, 1868–1896 (Yale UP, 1968) online book see also online review
- Edited with James C. Curtis. The Black Experience in America: Selected Essays. (U of Texas Press, 1970) online
- "New Perspectives on the Republican Party, 1877–1913," American Historical Review (1972) 77#4 pp. 1074-1082 online
- Progressives and Prohibitionists: Texas Democrats in the Wilson Era (U. of Texas Press, 1973)
- Reform and Regulation: American Politics, 1900-1916 (Wiley 1978 and two later editions).
- The Presidency of William McKinley (UP Kansas, 1980).
- The Spanish–American War and President McKinley (University Press of Kansas, 1982). online
- Lady Bird Johnson and the Environment (UP Kansas, 1988) online
- With Craig H. Roell. William McKinley: A Bibliography (Meckler, 1988).
- The Presidency of Theodore Roosevelt (UP Kansas, 1991).
- 1968: The Election That Changed America (Ivan R. Dee, 1993).
- Editor, American First Ladies: Their Lives and Their Legacy (Garland, 1996; 2nd ed. Routledge, 2001).
- With Nancy Beck Young. Texas, Her Texas: The Life and Times of Frances Goff (Texas State Historical Association, 1997).
- Lady Bird Johnson: Our Environmental First Lady (UP of Kansas, 1999).
- With Melissa R. Sneed. “Without Pride or Apology: The University of Texas at Austin, Racial Integration, and the Barbara Smith Case.” The Southwestern Historical Quarterly (1999) 103#1 pp. 66–87. online
- "Howard Roberts Lamar" in Clio's Favorites: Leading Historians of the United States, 1945–2000 ed. by Robert Allen Rutland. (Columbia: University of Missouri Press, 2000) pp. 84-97.
- Editor, Watching Television Come of Age: The New York Times Reviews by Jack Gould (U. of Texas Press, 2002).
- Alexander Watkins Terrell (U of Texas Press, 2004). online
- The Most Exclusive Club: A History of the Modern United States Senate (2005)
- Grand Old Party: A History of the Republicans (Random House, 2007). online
  - The Republicans: A History of the Grand Old Party (Oxford UP, 2nd ed. 2014)
- Editor, Bull Moose on the Stump: The 1912 Campaign Speeches of Theodore Roosevelt (UP of Kansas, 2008).
- The Modern American Presidency (2nd ed. UP of Kansas, 2009) online
- The William Howard Taft Presidency (UP Kansas, 2009)
- Four Hats in the Ring: The 1912 Election and the Birth of Modern American Politics (2009) online
- Helen Taft: Our Musical First Lady (UP Kansas, 2010)
- Edith Kermit Roosevelt: Creating the Modern First Lady (2012) online
- Chief Executive to Chief Justice: Taft Betwixt the White House and Supreme Court (UP Kansas, 2014) online
- The First Modern Clash over Federal Power: Wilson versus Hughes in the Presidential Election of 1916 (UP of Kansas, 2016) online

== See also ==
- History of the Republican Party (United States)
- First Lady of the United States
