= Charlie Siringo =

American detective (1855–1928)

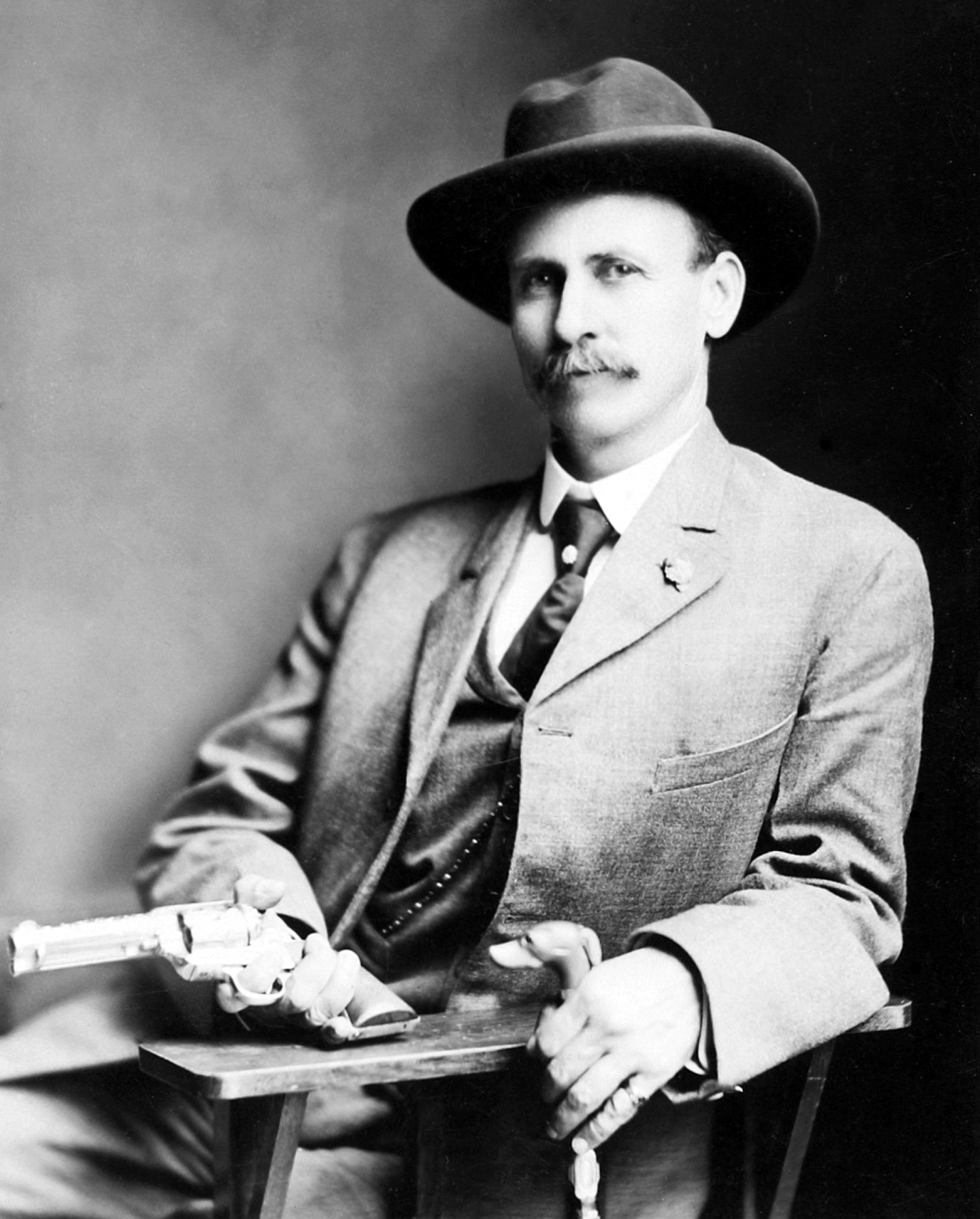
- Siringo, c. 1890
- Born: Charles Angelo Sartana Siringo; February 7, 1855; Matagorda County, Texas
- Died: October 18, 1928 (aged 73); Altadena, California
- Occupations: Lawman, detective, bounty hunter, cowboy, author, merchant
- Known for: Being a lawman and Pinkerton detective

Charles Angelo Sartana Siringo (February 7, 1855 – October 18, 1928) was an American lawman, detective, bounty hunter, and agent for the Pinkerton National Detective Agency during the late 19th and early 20th centuries.

== Early life ==
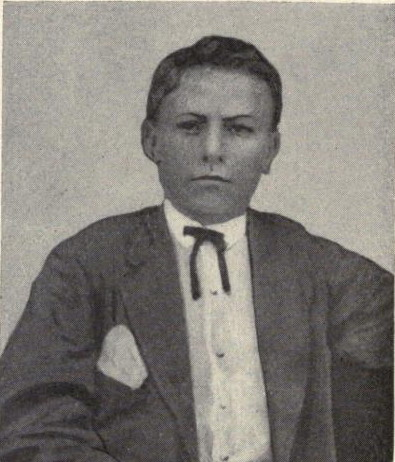
Young Siringo

Siringo was born on Matagorda Peninsula in Matagorda County, Texas, to an Irish immigrant mother and an Italian immigrant father of Sicilian origins who arrived from Genoa, where his family had long since moved. His father died when Siringo was a year old. He attended public school until the start of the American Civil War, then took his first cowpuncher lessons in 1867 before moving to St. Louis after his mother remarried. Siringo attended Fisk public school for a time while in New Orleans but then started work as a cowboy for Abel Head "Shanghai" Pierce in April 1871, after returning to Texas.

In July 1877, Siringo was in Dodge City, Kansas, where he survived an encounter with Bat Masterson.

Siringo was already working as a cattle drive cowboy when he started working for the LX Ranch in 1877. This job entailed chasing after LX cattle stolen by Billy the Kid in 1880. Siringo stopped working for the LX Ranch when he married Mamie in 1884 and opened a tobacco store in Caldwell, Kansas. Their daughter Viola was born on 28 February 1885. He began writing his autobiography, A Texas Cow Boy; Or Fifteen Years on the Hurricane Deck of a Spanish Pony. A year later it was published to wide acclaim, and Siringo moved his family to Chicago in the spring of 1886 for publication of a second printing.

=== Pinkerton service ===
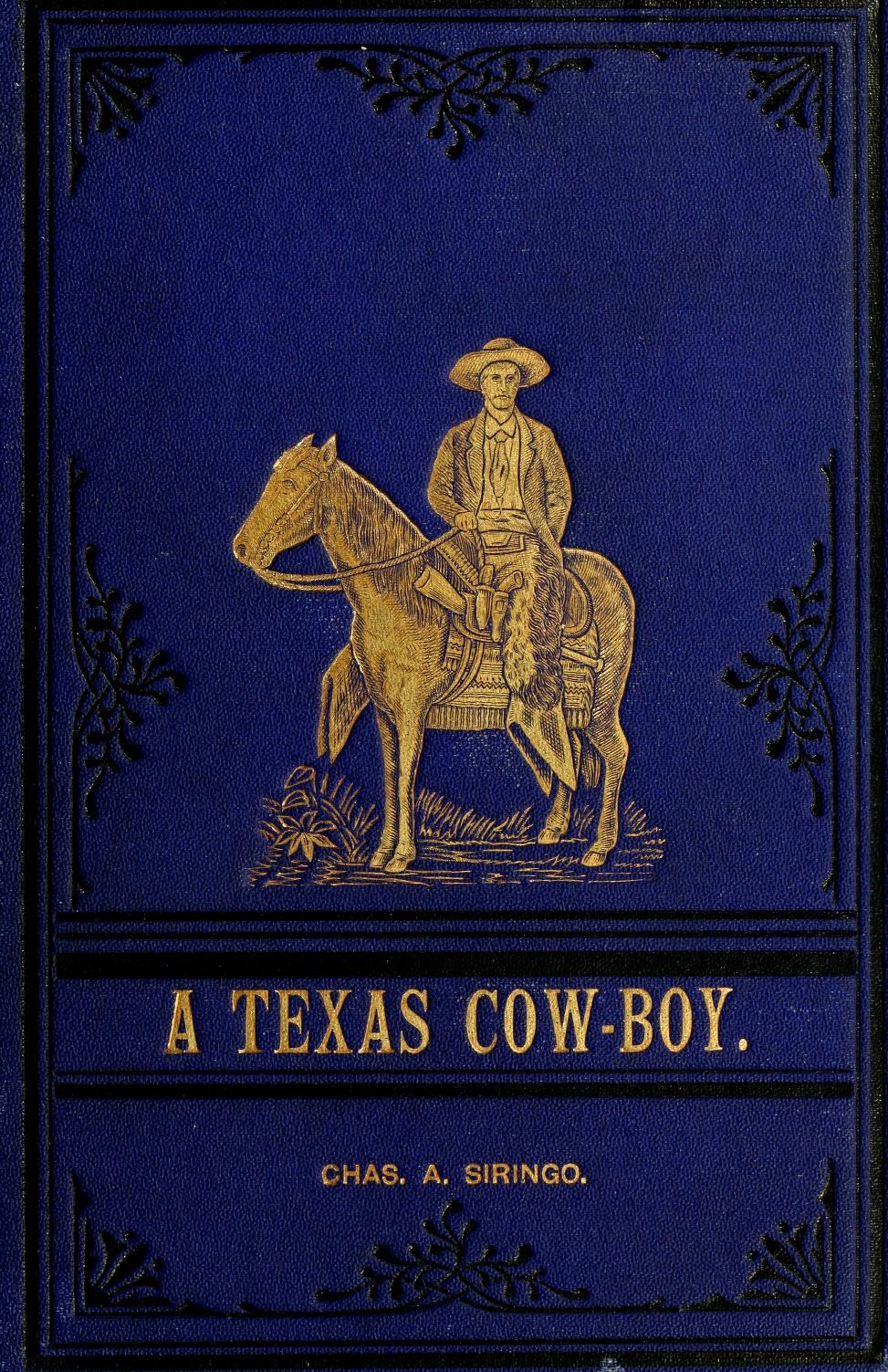
Cover of A Texas Cow Boy

In 1886, Siringo witnessed the Chicago Haymarket affair. This prompted him to join the Pinkerton National Detective Agency, using gunman Pat Garrett's name as a reference to get the job, having met Garrett in 1880 when they were searching for Billy the Kid. Siringo was assigned to Denver, reporting to James McParland, and moved his family there. His wife died in 1890, and his daughter went to live with his wife's aunt and her husband, Emma and Will F. Read.

He was immediately assigned several cases, which took him as far north as Alaska, for the Treadwell mine, and as far south as Mexico City. He began operating under cover, a relatively new technique at the time, and infiltrated gangs of robbers and rustlers, making more than 100 arrests.

In the early 1890s, he found himself assigned to office work in the Denver office of the agency, work which he greatly despised. During that time, he worked with noted Pinkerton agent, gunman, and later assassin Tom Horn. He greatly admired Horn's talents and skills in tracking down suspects, but reflected later that Horn had a dark side that could easily be accessed when need be.

In February 1891, assuming the name Charles T. Leon, Siringo undertook a 6-month investigation for New Mexico Governor L. Bradford Prince. Siringo investigated the attempted assassination of Elias S. Stover, Thomas B. Catron, T.B. Mills, and Joseph Anchete. Siringo was able to infiltrate Las Gorras Blancas and the Knights of Labor, while understanding their relationship with the Santa Fe Ring. The investigation was called off before Siringo could gather enough evidence to definitively state who was behind the shooting. Siringo did, however, purchase 265 acres near Santa Fe, New Mexico, and established his Sunny Slope Ranch. Located north of Arroyo Chamiso, Siringo built a two-room adobe home, with a view of the Sangre de Cristo Mountains.

In 1892, Siringo was assigned to a case in the Idaho Panhandle, Silver Valley, for the Mine Owners' Protective Association. He assumed the identity of Charles Leon Allison, working as a shoveler in the Gem Mine. Siringo at first turned down the assignment, telling his boss, James McParland, that he sympathized with the union miners. McParland later asked him to go anyway, with the agreement that Siringo could leave if he still felt the same way after seeing the situation. Siringo infiltrated the Gem Miners' Union, and decided that the leadership was in the hands of anarchists such as George Pettibone. After 14 months, which included the Coeur d'Alene, Idaho labor strike of 1892, Siringo's undercover work and testimony helped convict 18 union leaders.

Siringo married Lillie Thomas in 1893, and their son William Lee Roy was born in 1896. However, they soon divorced, when she wanted to live in Los Angeles, California.

For 4 years starting in 1899, posing under the aliases "Charles L. Carter", an alleged Mexican outlaw on the run from the law for murder, "Chas. Tony Lloyd", and later as "Harry Blevins", Siringo infiltrated Butch Cassidy's Wild Bunch. Siringo called Butch Cassidy, "the shrewdest and most daring out law of the present age," and the Wild Bunch "kept a system of blind post offices all the way from the Hole-in-the-Wall in northern Wyoming to Alma in southern New Mexico, these post offices being in rocky crevices or on top of round mounds on the desert." In Siringo's words, "I closed the Union Pacific train robbery case after having traveled more than 25,000 miles by rail, vehicles, afoot, and on horseback, and after being on the operation constantly for about four years. The 'Wild Bunch' during these four years were pretty well scattered, many being put in their graves and others in prison." During that time, Siringo referred to both Tom Horn and Joe Lefors as friends.

On that case, Siringo often coordinated with Tom Horn, who was by that time working for large cattle companies as a stock detective, but who also was retained by the Pinkerton Agency on contract to assist in the robbery investigation. Horn was able to obtain vital information from explosives expert Bill Speck that revealed to investigators who the suspects were who had killed Sheriff Josiah Hazen, who had been shot and killed during the pursuit of the robbers.

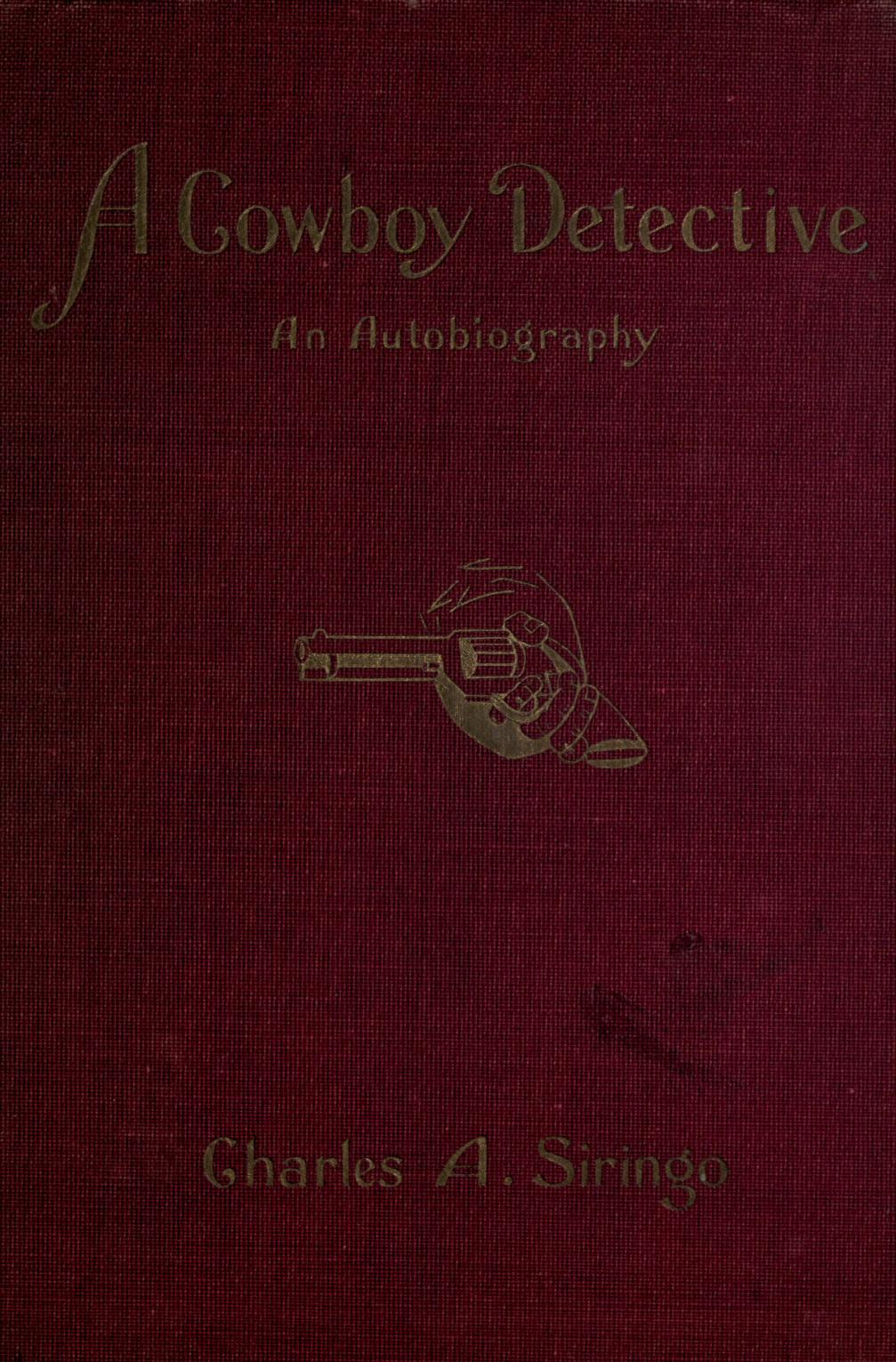
Cover of A Cowboy Detective

In 1907, during the trial of the Western Federation of Miners' Bill Haywood, Siringo was assigned as a bodyguard for Albert Horsley. After the acquittal, Siringo warned Idaho Governor Frank Gooding of plans to lynch Haywood, Pettibone, Charles Moyer, and Haywood's lawyer Clarence Darrow, which prevented the hanging.

== After the Pinkertons ==
In 1907, Siringo married Grace, after resigning from the Pinkertons. That marriage ended in divorce in 1909. Siringo accepted some assignments from William J. Burns' Detective Agency.

Siringo wrote another book, Pinkerton's Cowboy Detective. The Pinkerton Detective Agency delayed publication for two years, feeling it violated the confidentiality agreement that Siringo had signed upon hiring. Siringo capitulated, and deleted their name from the book title and elsewhere in the book. Thus, Pinkerton's Cowboy Detective became A Cowboy Detective, and the names of other characters were fictionalized.

In 1913, Siringo was briefly married to Ellen Partain. This was Siringo's last attempt at marriage.

Angry with the agency after it sabotaged the publication of his cowboy memoirs, Siringo published Two Evil Isms: Pinkertonism and Anarchism, a revealing chronicle of Pinkerton methods and deception. Siringo wrote that he had been instructed to commit voter fraud in the re-election campaign of Colorado Governor James Peabody. Siringo said, "I voted eight times, as per [Pinkerton supervisor] McParland's orders—three times before the same election judges". The election was unique, owing to fraud by Democrats and Republicans that resulted in Colorado having three different governors seated during the course of one day. In the book, Siringo defended his work against the leadership of the Western Federation of Miners, but he admitted "one dark blot on my conscience" for his work as an informant among the coal miners of southern Colorado, for the Colorado Fuel and Iron Company: "... I hated to report their threats against the greedy corporation which treated them as slaves."

The Pinkerton Agency succeeded in suppressing the book, charging Siringo with criminal libel, and calling for his arrest and extradition to Chicago. New Mexico Governor McDonald denied the extradition request. Yet, Pinkerton was successful in getting a court order impounding the book's plates and remaining copies.

In 1916, Siringo began working as a New Mexico Mounted Patrolman to assist in the capture of numerous rustlers in the area, holding that position until 1918. His health began to fail, and his ranch was failing owing to his absence. He moved to Los Angeles, where he became somewhat of a celebrity due to his exploits. He renewed his relationship with Wyatt Earp during this period.

In 1920, Siringo published the History of "Billy the Kid". By 1922, Siringo's financial difficulties required relinquishing his Santa Fe ranch, and moving to Los Angeles. In 1924, Siringo played the part of an old cowboy in the movie Nine Scars Make a Man. In 1925, Siringo served as a consultant for William S. Hart's Tumbleweeds.

In 1927, he released another book, Riata and Spurs, a composite of Lone Star Cowboy and A Cowboy Detective. The Pinkerton Agency again halted publication, resulting in a bowdlerized copy, with many fictional accounts rather than the true accounts that Siringo had envisioned.

=== Death ===
Siringo died in Altadena, California, on October 18, 1928. He was buried at Inglewood Park Cemetery, Inglewood, California.

== In popular culture ==
- In Loren Estleman's Ragtime Cowboys, Charles Siringo is a lead character partnered with Dashiell Hammett to engage in an investigation.
- In Sergio Sollima's 1967 Spaghetti Western film Face to Face, a character patterned after Siringo (but with his first name being spelled "Charley") is portrayed by William Berger. Siringo's appearance in the film is an anachronism, as Face to Face takes place in the American Civil War, when the real Siringo was only a child.
- Charles Siringo also appears as a character in Leif Enger's So Brave, Young, and Handsome (2008; ISBN 978-0-87113-985-6).
- Siringo Road, a major thoroughfare on the south side of the city of Santa Fe, New Mexico, is named for the former detective and writer.
- In Larry McMurtry's novel Streets of Laredo, Call reads Siringo's first book and tells Charles Goodnight that it is mostly yarns.
- Mike Blakely's original composition and song titled "Charlie Siringo" was about the life of Charlie Siringo.
- Charles Siringo is referenced admiringly in Arthur Penn's quirky 1976 Western The Missouri Breaks.
- Charles Siringo appeared in the comic book "Wynonna Earp".

== Bibliography ==
=== Works by ===
- — (1885). A Texas Cow Boy: Or, Fifteen Years On The Hurricane Deck of A Spanish Pony. Chicago: M. Umbdenstock and Company. ISBN 0-14-043751-7.
- — (1886). A Texas Cow Boy: Or, Fifteen Years On The Hurricane Deck of A Spanish Pony [2nd edition]. Chicago: Siringo & Dobson.
- — (1912). A Cowboy Detective: A True Story of Twenty-Two Years With A World-Famous Detective Agency. Chicago: W. B. Conkey Company. ISBN 0-8032-9189-2.
- — (1915). Two Evil Isms, Pinkertonism and Anarchism: By A Cowboy Detective Who Knows, as He Spent Twenty-Two Years in the Inner Circle of Pinkerton's National Detective Agency. ISBN 1-4297-6551-8.
- — (1919). A Lone Star cowboy. Santa Fe.
- — (1919). A Song Companion of A Lone Star Cowboy. Santa Fe.
- — (1920). A History of "Billy the Kid". Charles A. Siringo.
- —; Gifford Pinchot (1927). Riata and Spurs: The Story Of A Lifetime Spent In The Saddle As Cowboy And Ranger. ISBN 1-4179-1067-4.

=== Works about ===
- Barclay, Donald A. "Charles A. Siringo". Nineteenth-Century American Western Writers. Ed. Robert L. Gale. Dictionary of Literary Biography Vol. 186. Detroit: Gale, 1997. ISBN 978-0-7876-1682-3.
- Lamar, Howard R. (2005). Charlie Siringo's West: An Interpretive Biography. University Of New Mexico Press. ISBN 0-8263-3669-8.
- Peavy, Charles D. (1967). Charles A. Siringo: A Texas Picaro. Austin, Texas: Steck-Vaughn Company. 2019759
- Pingenot, Ben E. (1989). Siringo: The True Story Of Charles A. Siringo, Texas Cowboy, Longhorn Trail Driver, Private Detective, Rancher, New Mexico Ranger and Author. College Station, Texas: Texas A&M University Press. ISBN 0-89096-381-9.
- Blum, Howard (2011). The Floor of Heaven: A True Tale of the Last Frontier and the Yukon Gold Rush. Crown Publishers. ISBN 978-0-307-46172-8.

Ward, Nathan. Son of the Old West. NY: Grove Atlantic,2023. Coming on 5 September 2023. ISBN 978-0-8021-6208-3
