= Charlie Siringo's West =

2005 biography of Charlie Siringo by Howard R. Lamar

Charlie Siringo's West: An Interpretive Biography
- Charlie Siringo's West first edition cover.
- Author: Howard R. Lamar
- Language: English
- Subject: Biography
- Publisher: University of New Mexico Press
- Publication date: November 30, 2005
- Publication place: United States
- Media type: Print (Hardback)
- Pages: 384 pp (first edition)
- ISBN: 978-0-8263-3669-9
- OCLC: 60421190
- Dewey Decimal: 976.4/092 B 22
- LC Class: F391.S624 L36 2005

Charlie Siringo's West: An Interpretive Biography is a biography of former Pinkerton Detective Charlie Siringo, by historian Howard R. Lamar. It was published by the University of New Mexico Press in 2005.

In addition to its purely biographical theme, the book examines Siringo's life in the context of the Pinkerton agency's descent into illegality, and the increasing romanticisation of "Wild West" characters by a fast-growing Hollywood film industry of the 1920s.

The book won the 2006 Bronze Wrangler award for nonfiction from the National Cowboy and Western Heritage Museum.

== Editions ==
- Albuquerque, NM: University of New Mexico Press, 2005 , ISBN 0-8263-3669-8
