= John Rope =

White Mountain Apache clan leader and Apache scout

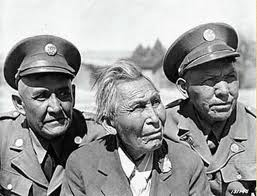
Rope with two US army personnel (date unknown)

John Rope (circa 1855/1863 – 8 August 1944, born Tlodilhil (Black Rope) was a White Mountain Apache clan leader and Apache scout who received a medal of honor. Rope was born somewhere between Old Summit and Black River, Arizona, but says his earliest memories are from his time near Cedar Creek, which is just west of Fort Apache. Rope's father was Nayundiie, a White Mountain Apache clan leader. He was foster brother to Mickey Free.

Rope went to San Carlos in mid-1870 while in his early twenties to enlist along with his brother and Yavapais, Tonto Apaches, San Carlos Apaches, and other White Mountain Apaches. He and his brother shared a horse and rode double to reach their destination. Rope stated that he had joined the army "in order to help the whites against the Chiricahuas because they had killed a lot of people." Rope rode as a scout for General George Crook during the Apache Wars.

During his time as a scout Rope attempted to arrest Casador (Casadora, Nànt'àntco - "great chief") a Western Apache, who was chief of the San Carlos Apaches. Casador had turned renegade after shooting and killing a woman and a man. He had dug in at Black Mesa and during the encounter with Rope one of the other Apache scouts was killed after Casador's warriors had opened fire upon them. Rope was with Crook during the capture of Chihuahua in the Sierra Madres and gave an account of the killing of Chihuahua's aunt by other scouts which resulted in the death of a young white captive boy by name of Charley McComas. Rope was extensively interviewed by Grenville Goodwin in later life. Rope was buried in Bylas, Arizona following his death and was given a full United States military honors burial, by the U.S. Army scouts based in Fort Huachuca. He was the first Apache scout to receive this honor.

== Bibliography ==
- Arizona State Government. "Death Certificate" (PDF). Arizona State Government. Archived from the original (PDF) on February 1, 2017.
- Basso, Keith H (1971). Keith H. Basso (ed.). Western Apache Raiding and Warfare. University of Arizona Press. ISBN 978-0816502974.
- English Westerners' Society (1971). The Brand Book. University of Wisconsin: English Westerners' Society.
- Jastrzembski, Joseph C. (2007). The Apache Wars: The Final Resistance. Chelsea House. ISBN 978-0791093436.
- Lorenzo, Louis (13 February 2008). "Following the trails of our Apache ancestors". Eastern Arizona Courier.. In an article published in the Eastern Arizona Courier on February 13, 2008, the reporter Louis Lorenzo interviewed Ada Rope Jordan and Irene Rope Rustin, daughters of John Rose. The article states that John Rose "...was laid to rest in the 1940s in Bylas and was the first Apache scout to receive a medal of honor and to be buried with full military honors (by the U.S. Army scouts from Ft. Huachuca)." This reference does not refer to the Medal of Honor, the highest military decoration awarded by the United States armed forces, as there is no record of that decoration being awarded to John Rope. See Wikipedia articles List of Medal of Honor recipients for the Indian Wars, and List of Native American Medal of Honor recipients and the U.S. Army Center of Military History Website, Native American Medal of Honor Recipients Archived 2017-01-26 at the Wayback Machine.
- Lahti, Janne (2009). Community, Power, and Colonialism -The U.S. Army in Southern Arizona and New Mexico, 1866-1886. University of Helsinki. ISBN 978-952-10-5311-5.
- McKanna, Clare Vernon (2005). White Justice in Arizona: Apache Murder Trials in the Nineteenth Century. Texas Tech University. ISBN 978-0896725546.
- Rope, John (1971). Keith H. Basso (ed.). Western Apache Raiding and Warfare. University of Arizona Press. ISBN 978-0816502974.
- Smith, Victoria (2010). Captive Arizona, 1851-1900. University of Nebraska. ISBN 978-0803210905.
- Thrapp, Dan L. (1991). Encyclopedia Frontier Biography: A-F. University of Nebraska. ISBN 978-0803294189.
- Utley, Robert M. (2013). Geronimo. Yale University Press. ISBN 978-0300198362.
- University of Arizona. "Experiences of an Indian scout, exceprts from the life of John Rope, and "old timer" of the White Mountain Apaches, as told to Grenville Goodwin". University of Arizona.
