= Farthing, Wyoming =

Rural town in Laramie County, Wyoming, U.S.

Coordinates: 41.54639°N 105.21472°W

Farthing, later re-named Iron Mountain, was a small, rural town in Laramie County, Wyoming, formerly located southwest of Chugwater in the Chugwater Creek valley. The land where it once stood is now privately owned, part of an extensive ranch.

== History ==
The region was originally named Iron Mountain due to iron deposits discovered on a nearby ridge in 1850 and briefly mined in 1870. Homesteading in the area began in the 1870s, and a railroad station and post office were soon established. Also, numerous ranches were established along the various spring creeks that flowed into Chugwater Creek. The railroad was extended north from Cheyenne in anticipation of heavy mining development which never occurred. The railroad station was designated "Farthing" after Charles Farthing who donated the land for the station in the early 1900s.

Among the homesteaders in the 1880s were William E. "Bill" Lewis and Frederick "Fred" Powell. Both men were suspected of rustling cattle from the larger ranchers. In July 1895 Bill Lewis was found dead with three shots in his chest at his ranch, and Fred Powell was shot dead a month later. Notorious range "detective" Tom Horn, who often spent time in the upper Chugwater valley as a "bronc buster", was suspected for both murders but never indicted.

In 1901 14-year-old Willie Nickell, son of the only sheepherder in the Iron Mountain region, was shot and killed while riding his father's horse in search for a herd of sheep that went missing nearby. Suspicion fell again on Tom Horn, a confession was procured from him while intoxicated and he was prosecuted and executed for the murder in Cheyenne, Wyoming.
