= Richard C. Levin =

American academic administrator

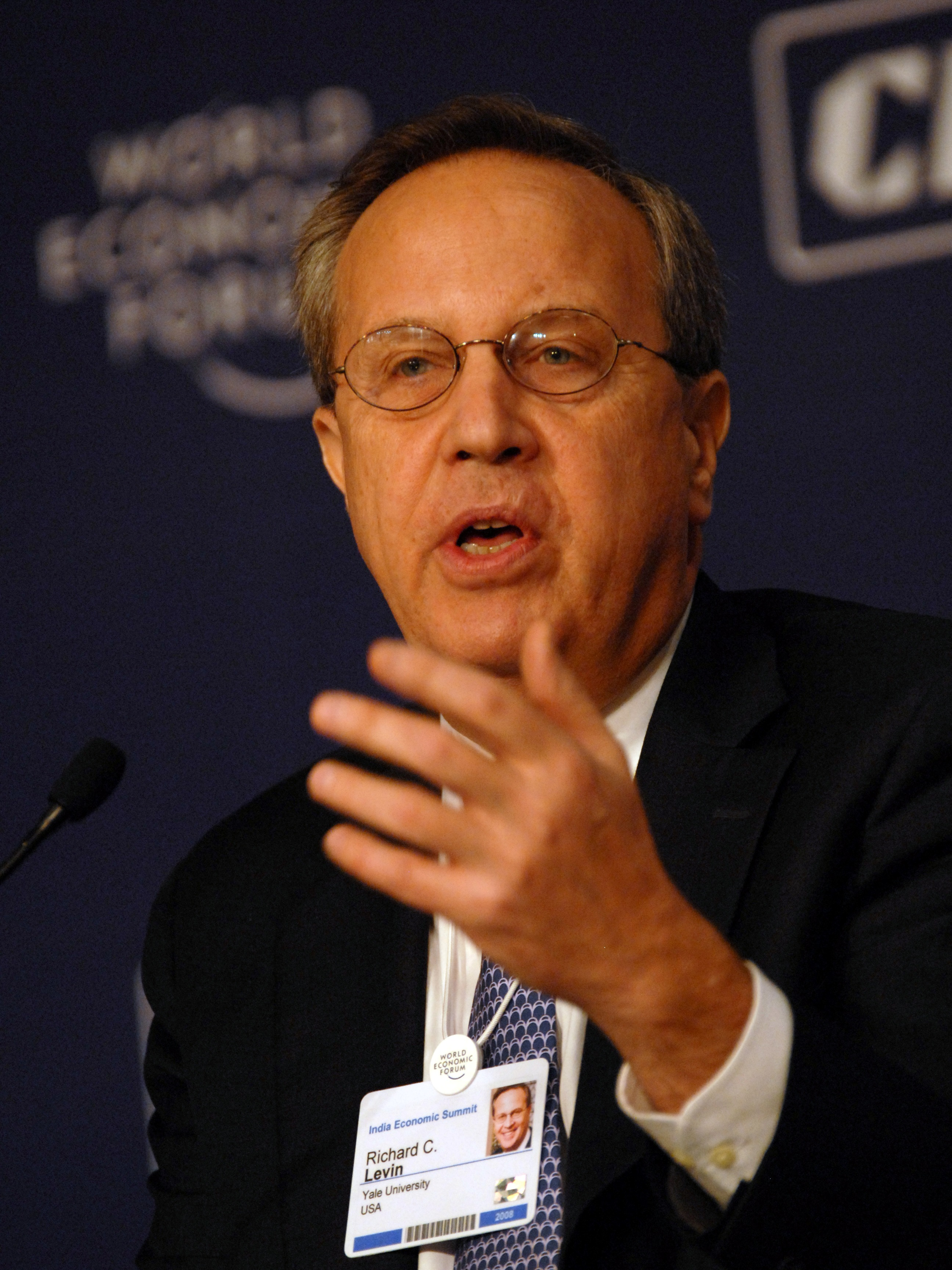

22nd President of Yale University
- In office 1993–2013
- Preceded by: Howard R. Lamar
- Succeeded by: Peter Salovey

Personal details
- Born: April 7, 1947 (age 79) San Francisco, California, U.S.
- Spouse: Jane Levin
- Children: 4, including Jonathan
- Education: Stanford University (BA); Merton College, Oxford (BLitt); Yale University (PhD)
- Profession: Economist

Richard Charles Levin (born April 7, 1947) is an American economist and academic administrator. From 1993 to 2013, he was the 22nd president of Yale University. From March 2014 to June 2017, he was chief executive officer of Coursera.

== Early life and education ==
Born in San Francisco, California, to Jewish-American parents, Levin graduated from Lowell High School in San Francisco in 1964. At Lowell, he was a member of the Lowell Forensic Society and debated in high school debate tournaments regionally. He graduated from Stanford University in 1968 with a B.A. in history. He then received a Bachelor of Letters in politics and philosophy from Merton College, Oxford. He earned his Ph.D. in economics from Yale in 1974. His academic specialties include industrial research and development, intellectual property, and productivity in manufacturing.

== Career ==
Levin became an assistant professor of economics at Yale in 1974 and was elevated to associate professor in 1979. In 1982, he was promoted to Professor of Economics and Management at the Yale School of Management. In 1992, he was appointed Frederick William Beinecke Professor of Economics. Before becoming president, he served as chairman of the Economics Department and dean of Yale's Graduate School of Arts and Sciences.

On February 6, 2004, Levin was appointed to the Iraq Intelligence Commission, an independent panel convened to investigate U.S. intelligence surrounding the United States' 2003 invasion of Iraq and Iraq's weapons of mass destruction. He had previously served on a government panel reviewing the U.S. Postal Service and an independent panel appointed by Major League Baseball to examine the sport's economics. Levin is a director of the William and Flora Hewlett Foundation, American Express, and Satmetrix.

Although described in Who's Who as a Democrat, Levin was one of the first guests of President George W. Bush in the White House during his first term and the president stayed at Levin's house when he received an honorary degree from Yale in 2001.

Levin had been rumored as a possible replacement for Larry Summers as Director of the White House National Economic Council until Gene Sperling was selected instead.

Levin stepped down as president of Yale on June 30, 2013. Shortly before his retirement as President of Yale University, he published a book, The Worth of the University, a sequel to his previous work, The Work of the University. He was succeeded by Peter Salovey.

As president of Yale, Levin studied and helped to some extent to guide what he called "the rise of Asia's universities". Yale's role in Asia is briefly set out below. In 2013, Levin agreed to serve on the advisory board for the newly created Schwarzman Scholars - fellowships that will take students from many countries for post-graduate study together at Tsinghua University in Beijing, with the aim of promoting international understanding.

In March 2014, Levin became chief executive officer of Coursera. In June 2017, Coursera announced that Levin was being replaced by Jeff Maggioncalda.

Levin and his wife Jane, also a professor at Yale, reside in New Haven, Connecticut. They have four children and eight grandchildren. Their son, Jonathan, was appointed as the 13th president of Stanford University, effective August 1, 2024.

=== Yale under Levin ===
During Levin's tenure, Yale's endowment grew from $3.2 billion to over $20 billion. Yale's admissions standards and academic prestige also recovered from a significant lull in the early 1990s since Levin's appointment. Applications to Yale College rose from fewer than 11,000 for the class entering in 1993 to 28,975 for the class entering in 2012, with the most recent classes reporting the highest range of standardized test scores for any college in America. Under Levin, Yale aggressively expanded its efforts to recruit international students and students from previously underrepresented regions of the United States.

Levin helped established a program for undergraduates in Beijing and increase participation in international work/study programs. Levin has made a special effort to expand Yale's engagement with China and was elected to the board of the National Committee on United States-China Relations.

Levin was president during the largest building and renovation program since the 1930s, including all of the university's residential colleges. About 70 percent of the space on campus was partially or comprehensively renovated between 1993 and 2013. Levin approved the creation of Yale's first two new residential colleges since the 1960s with the purpose of increasing the undergraduate population from around 5,400 to over 6,000. The project was delayed due to the 2008 financial crisis, but construction was begun in 2013, shortly after Levin resigned.

Levin vastly expanded the Yale campus with the creation of Yale's West Campus. The campus was created by the purchase of the 136-acre, 17-building Bayer Pharmaceutical campus in Orange, Connecticut, seven miles from Yale's main campus. The purchase was completed for $107 million in 2007 and was described at the time as a "ready-made, state-of-the-art research facility".

Levin's administration worked to improve Yale University's relationship with its local workers. In 2003, Levin negotiated eight-year contracts with the university's unionized workers that provided health care, extensive paid leave, and cumulative raises ranging from 32% to 43%, although he has also fought strongly against new unionization drives by hospital workers, graduate employees, and security guards.

Levin spearheaded the creation of the first liberal arts college in Asia, Yale-NUS College, a joint venture between Yale University and the National University of Singapore. Yale initially faced strong criticism that Singapore's various restrictions on press freedom and public protests, as well as its anti-homosexuality policies, would undermine Yale-NUS's liberal arts mission.

== Honors ==
In 1998, as President of Yale, Levin was awarded an honorary doctorate by the University of Oxford in a ceremony in which the President of Harvard University, Neil Rudenstine, was also honored. He was elected to the American Philosophical Society in 2013.

== See also ==
- List of presidents of Yale University

Academic offices
Preceded by Howard R. Lamar	President of Yale University; 1993–2013	Succeeded by Peter Salovey
