= Howard R. Lamar =

American historian (1923–2023)

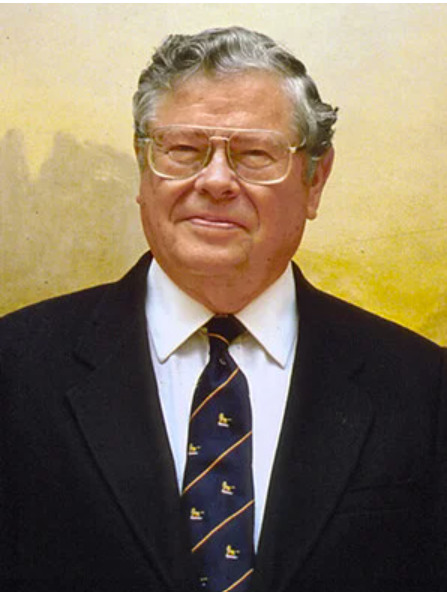

21st President of Yale University
- In office 1992–1993
- Preceded by: Benno C. Schmidt Jr.
- Succeeded by: Richard C. Levin

Personal details
- Born: November 18, 1923 Tuskegee, Alabama, U.S.
- Died: February 22, 2023 (aged 99)
- Education: Yale University; Emory University

Howard Roberts Lamar (November 18, 1923 – February 22, 2023) was an American historian of the American West. In addition to being Sterling Professor of History Emeritus at Yale University since 1994, he served as President of Yale University from 1992 to 1993.

== Biography ==
Lamar was born in Tuskegee, Alabama, on November 18, 1923, and was drawn into history in part by his rich family history which includes two United States Supreme Court justices and the second president of the Republic of Texas. He received his B.A. from Emory University in 1945 and his Ph.D. from Yale University in 1951. He was president of Yale from 1992 to 1993, and from 1994 to his death was a Sterling Professor of History Emeritus at Yale. He directed thirty-four dissertations in history and another thirteen in American studies. His prominent students include Lewis L. Gould and Patricia Nelson Limerick.

The Howard R. Lamar Center for the Study of Frontiers and Borders at Yale University was established in his honor.

Lamar died on February 22, 2023, at the age of 99.

== Bibliography ==
- Dakota Territory, 1861–1889
- The Cruise of the Portsmouth, 1845–1847
- The Far Southwest, 1846–1912: A Territorial History
- The Trader on the American Frontier: Myth’s Victim
- The New Encyclopedia of the American West
- Charlie Siringo's West: An Interpretive Biography

== See also ==
- List of presidents of Yale University

== Notes ==
Academic offices
Preceded by Benno C. Schmidt Jr.	President of Yale University; 1992–1993	Succeeded by Rick Levin
