= Wilcox train robbery =

Train robbery that took place in Albany County, Wyoming

Coordinates: 41°47′33″N 105°59′2″W

- Date: June 2, 1899
- Time: (MT)
- Location: Wilcox, Albany County, Wyoming, US
- Type: Train robbery
- Perpetrators: Butch Cassidy and the Wild Bunch

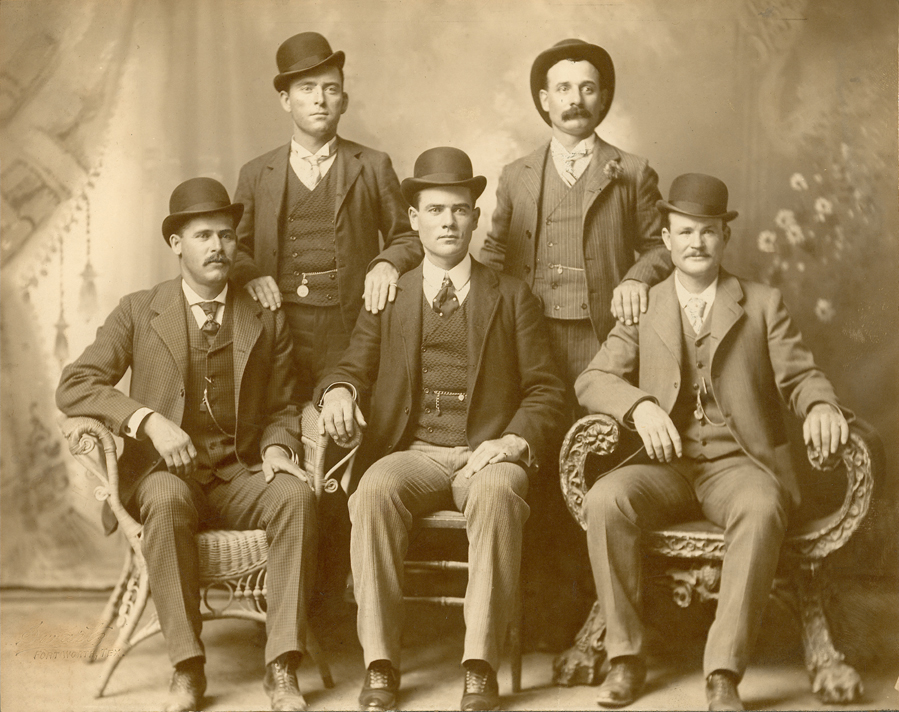
Butch Cassidy's Wild Bunch in 1900; from left to right: Sundance Kid, Will Carver, Ben Kilpatrick, Harvey Logan, and Butch Cassidy

The Wilcox train robbery also known as the Wilcox Holdup was a train robbery that took place in the early morning of June 2, 1899 in the vicinity of Wilcox in Albany County, Wyoming. A Union Pacific train was flagged down before it could cross a wooden bridge. Armed men forced the train crew to separate the locomotive from the carriages. Once the unattached locomotive had been driven across the bridge, the bridge was destroyed with dynamite. A safe in one of the carriages was blown open by dynamite, and the robbers escaped with cash and other valuables. The amount stolen was reported as much as US$36,000. The robbery was considered unsolved at the time and later traced to Butch Cassidy and the Wild Bunch.
