= Harvey Logan =

American outlaw and gunman (1867–1904)

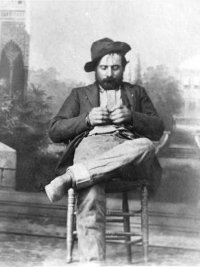
- Born: Harvey Alexander Logan; 1867; Richland Township, Tama County, Iowa, United States
- Died: June 17, 1904 (aged 36–37); Parachute, Colorado, United States
- Cause of death: Suicide by gunshot
- Resting place: Linwood Cemetery, Glenwood Springs, CO
- Other name: Kid Curry
- Occupations: Cowboy, bank robber, train robber, outlaw
- Allegiance: Butch Cassidy's Wild Bunch
- Criminal charges: Murder

Harvey Alexander Logan (1867 – June 17, 1904), also known as Kid Curry, was an American outlaw and gunman who rode with Butch Cassidy and the Sundance Kid's infamous Wild Bunch gang during the late 19th and early 20th centuries. Despite being less well-known than his fellow gang members, he has since been referred to as "the wildest of the Wild Bunch", having reputedly killed at least nine law enforcement officers in five shootings and another two men in other instances. He was involved in numerous shootouts with police and civilians and participated in several bank and train robberies with various gangs during his outlaw days.

== Early life ==
Logan was born in Richland Township, Tama County, Iowa in 1867. His mother died in 1876, and his brothers, Hank, Johnny and Lonny, moved to Dodson, Missouri to live with their aunt Lee Logan. Until at least 1883, Harvey made his living breaking horses on the Cross L ranch, near Rising Star, Texas. While there, he met and befriended a man named "Flat Nose" George Curry, from whom he took his new last name. His brothers soon adopted the same last name. The Logan brothers were known as hard workers until they got paid. Money did not stay in their pockets for long. They all had a taste for alcohol and women. Kid Curry would often return from a train or bank robbery, get drunk and lay up with prostitutes until his share of the take was gone. After Kid Curry became famous, the prostitutes would frequently name him as the father when they became pregnant. The children were referred to as "Curry Kids"; the number of children he actually fathered was probably fewer than five.

In 1883, Curry rode as a cowboy on a cattle drive to Pueblo, Colorado. While in Pueblo, he was involved in a saloon brawl. To avoid arrest, he fled, settling in southern Wyoming, where he began work at the "Circle Diamond" ranch. By all accounts, when sober, Curry was mild-mannered, likable, and loyal to both his friends and brothers.

== Outlaw life ==
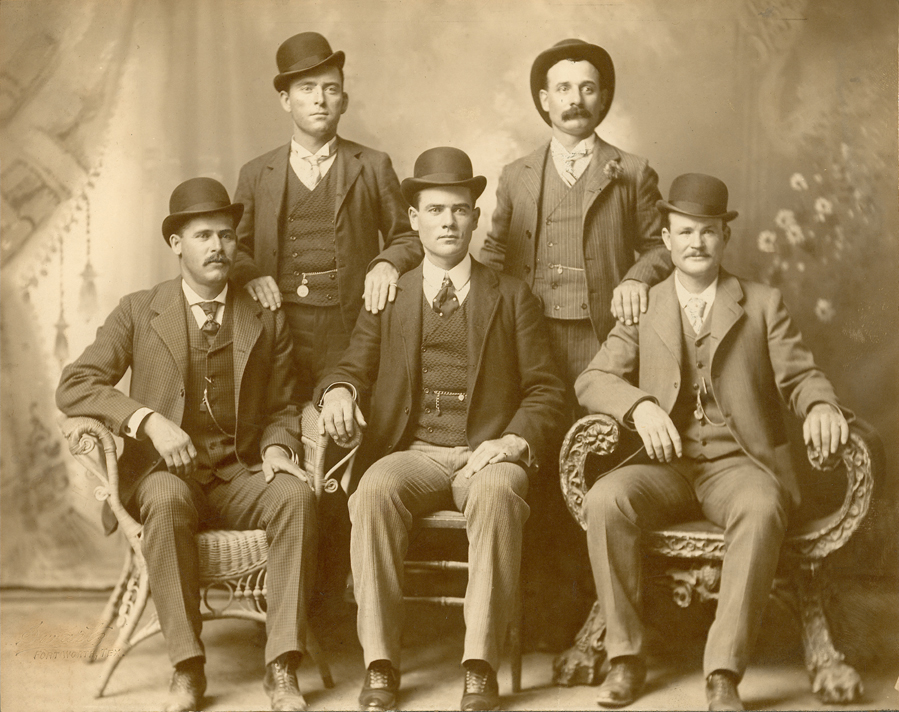
Logan (back right) with members of the Wild Bunch in the famous "Fort Worth Five" photograph. Click a person for more information. Click elsewhere on the image for a larger image.

The events that changed the course of his life began when his brother Hank and friend Jim Thornhill bought a ranch at Rock Creek, in what was then Chouteau County, Montana (now Phillips County). The ranch was near the site of a mine strike made by local miner and lawman Powell "Pike" Landusky. Landusky, according to some reports of the day, confronted Curry and attacked him, believing Curry was involved romantically with his step-daughter Elfie. Landusky then filed assault charges against Curry, who was arrested and beaten.

Two friends of Curry's, A.S. Lohman and Frank Plunkett, paid a $500 bond for Curry's release. Landusky's stepdaughter Elfie later claimed it was Curry's brother, Lonny, with whom she had been involved. However, the confession came much too late. On December 27, 1894, Curry caught Landusky at a local saloon and hit Landusky, stunning him. Curry, evidently believing the fight was over, began walking away. Landusky pulled his pistol and began threatening Curry, who was unarmed. Curry's friend and his brother's partner, Jim Thornhill, gave Curry his pistol. Landusky's gun jammed and Curry shot him dead.

Curry was arrested, but was released at an inquest when it was judged that he acted in self-defense. However, a formal trial was set. Curry believed he would not get a fair trial because the judge was close friends with Landusky. For this reason, Curry left town.

== Riding with the Black Jack Ketchum gang ==
Curry started riding with outlaw Tom "Black Jack" Ketchum. Pinkerton detectives began trailing Curry shortly after his departure from Montana. In January 1896, Curry received word that an old friend of Landusky's, rancher James Winters, had been spying on him for the reward offered in his arrest. Curry and two of his brothers, Johnny and Lonny, went to Winters' ranch to confront him. However, a shootout erupted. Johnny was killed, while Curry and Lonny escaped. Shortly after, Curry and Lonny argued with Black Jack Ketchum over the take in a train robbery. The two brothers left the gang and joined the circus.

== Forming his own gang ==
The brothers then received employment on a cattle ranch, arranged by their cousin, Bob Lee, near Sand Gulch, Colorado. Pinkerton agents trailing Curry gave up his trail briefly. Curry, Lonny, Walt Putnam and George Curry formed their own gang around this time. Curry temporarily left Colorado, intending to scout good targets for potential robberies. On April 15, 1897, Curry was reportedly involved in the killing of Deputy Sheriff William Deane of Powder River, Wyoming, as he and his gang gathered fresh horses on a ranch in the Powder River Basin. After this, he returned to Colorado to the ranch where he was working.

By June 1897, the cowboy job had ended, and Curry ventured north with the rest of the gang. They robbed a bank in Belle Fourche, South Dakota, and met resistance outside the bank from the townspeople. One of their friends, Tom O'Day, was captured when his horse spooked and ran away without him. The others escaped, but while planning a second robbery a posse from the town caught up with them in Fergus County, Montana. During a shootout, Curry was shot through the wrist, and his horse was shot from under him, resulting in his capture. George Curry and Walt Putnam were also captured. All three were held in the Deadwood, South Dakota jail, but only briefly; they overpowered the jailer and escaped. They headed back into Montana and robbed two post offices.

== Riding with Butch Cassidy and the Wild Bunch ==
During this time Curry began riding with Butch Cassidy's Wild Bunch gang. On June 2, 1899, the gang robbed the Union Pacific Railroad Overland Flyer passenger train near Wilcox, Wyoming, a robbery that became famous. Many notable lawmen of the day took part in the hunt for the robbers, but they were not captured.

During one shootout with lawmen following that robbery, Kid Curry and George Curry shot and killed Converse County Sheriff Joe Hazen. Tom Horn, a noted killer-for-hire and contract employee of the Pinkerton Agency, obtained information from explosives expert Bill Speck that identified George Curry and Kid Curry as Hazen's murderers, which Horn passed on to Pinkerton detective Charlie Siringo. The gang escaped into its hideout at the Hole-in-the-Wall.

Siringo had been assigned the task of bringing in the outlaw gang. He became friends with Elfie Landusky. Elfie was using the last name of Curry, alleging that Lonny Curry had got her pregnant. Through her, Siringo intended to locate the gang. Siringo changed his name to Charles L. Carter, disguised himself as an on-the-run gunman, and began mingling with people who might know the Currys, becoming friends with Jim Thornhill.

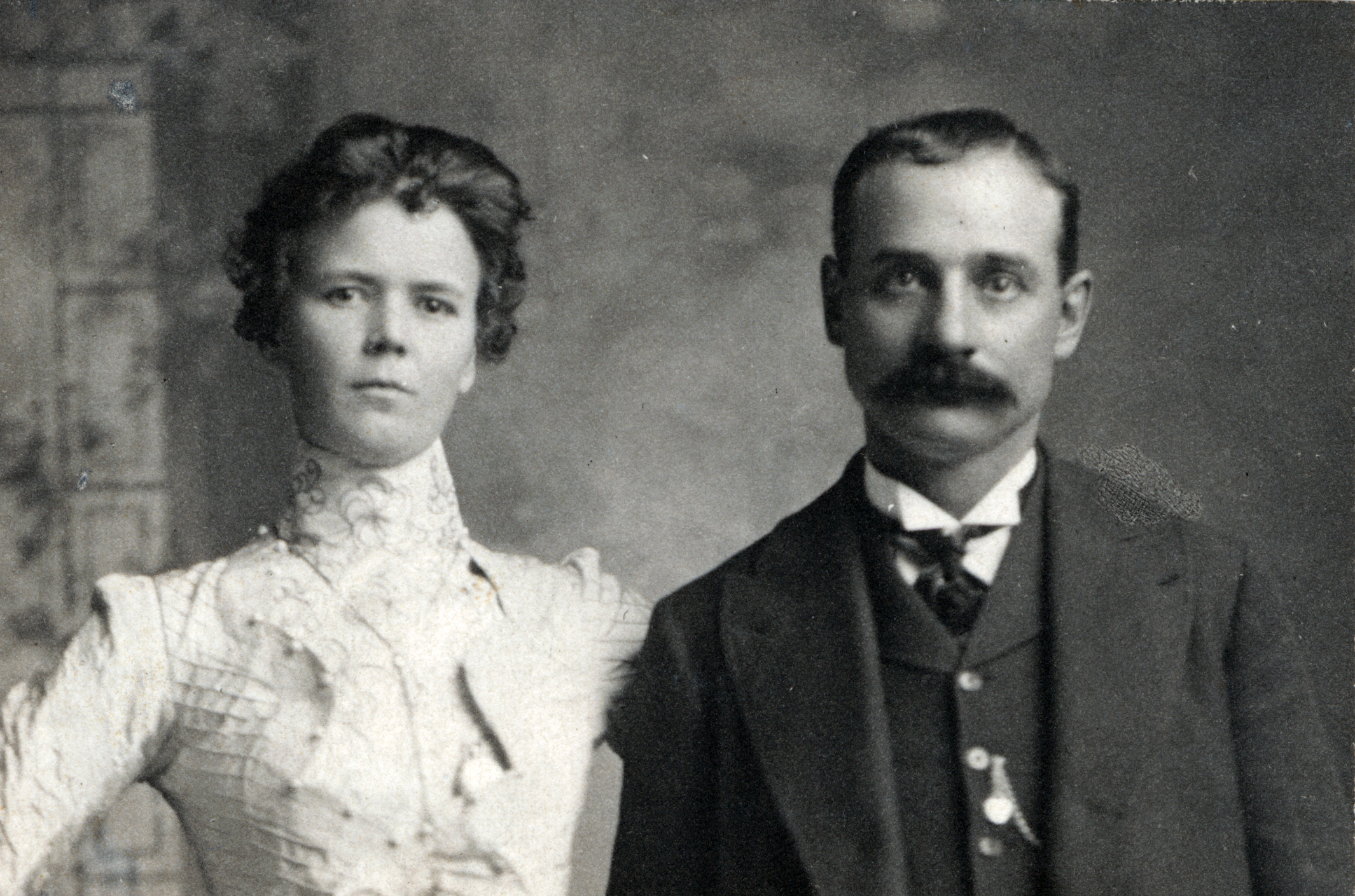
Logan with Della Moore

However, Kid Curry was hiding in Robbers Roost, another hideout used by the Wild Bunch in the remote canyon country of Utah. Curry then went to Alma, New Mexico, with Cassidy and others, intending to hide for a while. On July 11, 1899, while working at the W.S. Ranch, Curry robbed a Colorado and Southern Railroad train near Folsom, New Mexico with gang members Elzy Lay and Sam Ketchum, the brother of Tom "Black Jack" Ketchum. A posse led by Huerfano County, Colorado Sheriff Ed Farr cornered the gang near an area called Turkey Creek, which resulted in two gun battles over a period of four days. Lay and Ketchum were both wounded and later captured, with Lay killing the sheriff and mortally wounding Colfax County Deputy Henry Love in the process. Ketchum died from his wounds days later while in custody, and Lay received a life sentence for the murders. Curry escaped, but he, Cassidy, and other members of the gang were forced to leave New Mexico. Curry traveled to San Antonio, where he stayed briefly. While there he met prostitute Della Moore (also known as Annie Rogers or Maude Williams), with whom he became romantically involved. At the time of their meeting, she was working in Madame Fannie Porter's brothel, which was a regular hideout for the Wild Bunch gang.

== Revenge killings ==
On February 28, 1900, lawmen attempted to arrest Lonny Curry at his aunt's home in Dodson, Montana but Lonny was killed in the shootout that followed, and his cousin Bob Lee was arrested the same day at Cripple Creek, Colorado, for rustling and sent to prison in Cheyenne, Wyoming, and sentenced on 28 May 1900 to ten years in the state penitentiary at Rawlins, Wyoming. Kid Curry was now the last surviving Logan brother. Meanwhile, Curry was identified in St. Johns, Arizona as he was passing notes suspected of being from the Wilcox robbery. Local Apache County Sheriff Edward Beeler gathered a posse and began tracking Curry, who was accompanied by Bill "News" Carver. The posse shot it out with Curry and Carver on March 28. Curry and Carver killed Deputy Andrew Gibbons and Deputy Frank LeSueur. On May 26, Kid Curry rode into Utah and killed Grand County Sheriff Jesse Tyler and Deputy Sam Jenkins in a brazen shootout in Moab. Both killings were in retaliation for Tyler and Jenkins having killed George Curry and his brother Lonny.

Curry then returned to the Wild Bunch. On August 29, 1900, they robbed Union Pacific train No. 3 near Tipton, Wyoming, from which newspaper stories claimed the gang got more than $55,000. The gang again split up, with Kid Curry and Ben Kilpatrick heading south to Fort Worth, Texas, while Cassidy, the Sundance Kid, and Bill Carver immediately pulled off another robbery in Winnemucca, Nevada.

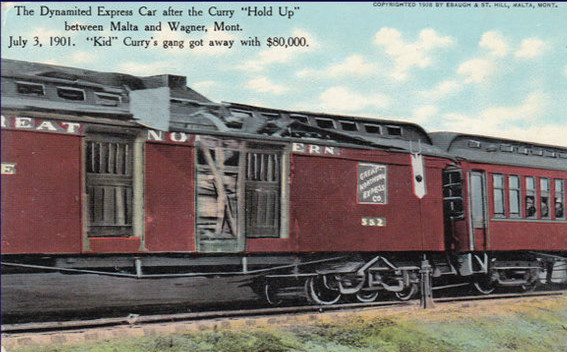
The dynamited Great Northern express car robbed July 3, 1901

Siringo, still working the case for the Pinkertons, was in Circleville, Utah, where Butch Cassidy had been raised. Curry rejoined the gang, and they hit a Great Northern train near Wagner, Montana, on July 3. This time, they took over $60,000 in cash. Gang member Bill Carver was killed in Sonora, Texas, by Sutton County, Sheriff Elijah Briant during the pursuit following that robbery.

Again the gang split up. In October 1901, Della Moore was arrested in Nashville, Tennessee, for passing money tied to an earlier robbery involving Curry. On November 5 and 6, gang members Ben Kilpatrick and Laura Bullion were captured in St. Louis, Missouri. On December 13, Kid Curry shot Knoxville, Tennessee, policemen William Dinwiddle and Robert Saylor in a shootout and escaped. Despite being pursued by Pinkerton agents and other law enforcement officials, Curry returned to Montana, where he shot and killed rancher James Winters, who was responsible for the killing of his brother Johnny years before.

== Capture, escape, and death ==
Curry then traveled back to Knoxville. In a pool hall on November 30, 1902, Curry was captured after a lengthy physical fight with lawmen. He was convicted of robbery because facts in the murder of the two policemen were not definite and no witnesses would testify, and he received a sentence of 20 years of hard labor and a $5,000 fine. On June 27, 1903, Curry escaped. Rumors that a deputy had received an $8,000 bribe to allow his escape spread, but this was never proven.

On June 7, 1904, Kid Curry was tracked down by a posse outside of Parachute, Colorado. Curry and two others had robbed a Denver and Rio Grande train outside Parachute. As they escaped, they stole fresh horses owned by Roll Gardner and a neighbor. The next morning, when Gardner and the neighbor discovered their horses had been stolen, they set out in pursuit of the gang. They joined up with a posse and continued tracking the outlaws. The gang shot Gardner's and his neighbor's horses from under them; Gardner found cover while his neighbor started running. Kid Curry took aim at the neighbor and Gardner shot Curry. The wounded Curry decided to end it at that time, and fatally shot himself in the head to avoid capture. The other two robbers escaped. The rifle Gardner used is still in the family today. Rumors persist that Curry was not killed in Parachute and was misidentified, having actually departed for South America with Butch Cassidy and the Sundance Kid. Charlie Siringo resigned from the Pinkertons, believing they got the wrong man.

Curry is buried in Pioneer (Linwood) Cemetery overlooking Glenwood Springs, Colorado, a short distance from fellow gunfighter Doc Holliday's memorial.

== In popular culture ==
- Curry appears as a character in Mr American by George MacDonald Fraser. The novel, set in 1909, uses the controversy surrounding Curry's death to portray him as surviving the shootout near Parachute and later tracking the novel's protagonist, Mark Franklin, to England, where Curry attempts to kill Franklin.
- John Dehner played Kid Curry in the 1953 film Powder River.
- Phillip Pine played Kid Curry in the episode "Kid Curry" on the TV series Tales of Wells Fargo (1959).
- Ted Cassidy played Kid Curry in the 1969 film Butch Cassidy and the Sundance Kid.
- Ben Murphy portrayed a fictionalised Kid Curry in the 1970s television show Alias Smith and Jones.
- The MythBusters tested the claim that Curry could drop a silver dollar off his hand and then draw and fire five shots from his revolver before it hit the ground. They found the claim to be highly unlikely.
- Kid Curry, alongside other members of the Wild Bunch, appears as an enemy in the 2013 first-person shooter video game Call of Juarez: Gunslinger.
