= Mickey Free =

Mexican-born adopted Apache warrior and US Army Indian scout (1848/51–1914)

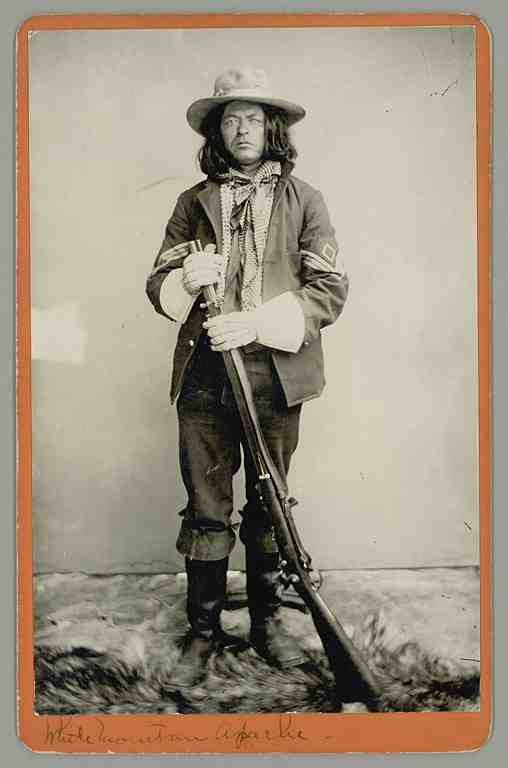
- Born: Felix Telles; 1848 or 1851; Mexico
- Died: 1914; Navaho County, Arizona
- Other names: Mig-gan-la-iae; Felix Ward
- Occupations: Warrior; U.S. Army Indian scout

Mickey Free (1848/1851 - 1914), Apache name Mig-gan-la-iae, birth name Felix Telles, was an Apache Indian scout and bounty hunter on the American frontier. Following his kidnapping by Apaches as a child (an event which led to the Bascom Affair), he was raised as one and became a warrior. Later he joined the U.S. Army's Apache Scouts, serving at Fort Verde between December 1874 and May 1878 and was given the nickname Mickey Free.

== Early life ==
Telles' mother was Maria Jesus Martinez, a Mexican woman. His father was Santiago Telles. As sixteen-year-olds, the two met and fell in love but Telles did not marry Maria Jesus, perhaps because of resistance from Santiago's parents. His given name at birth was Felix. In 1858, Maria Jesus and her two children, Felix and his half-sister, Teodora Rangel, met and moved in with John Ward, an Irishman who had migrated to the Arizona Territory and started a ranch. The August 26, 1860 United States Census for the Sonoita Creek settlement in the Arizona Territory indicates that Felix Ward was 12 years old, his sister Teodora was 10, and his sister Mary Ward was 5 months. Maria Jesus Martinez was listed as 30 years old and John Ward as 54 years old. A half-brother, Santiago Ward, later claimed his birth as July 25, 1860, but this contradicts the census record. John Ward and María Jesús had five children before his death in 1867.

== Capture by the Apaches ==
Felix Telles was playing by himself and climbed a tree near his farm. An Apache Warrior rode up beside Felix and put him on his horse abducting him into the tribe. Felix was abducted at age 12 on January 27, 1861, by a Pinal Apache raiding party. He was later traded to the Coyotero Apache, who are also known as White Mountain Apaches. The kidnapping had lasting implications for relations between the Apache and the United States. Felix Telles's abduction led directly to the start of the hostilities between the United States Army and the various Apache nations. John Ward was away from his home on Sonoita Creek on business. Returning home, he learned from neighbors that his cattle and step-son had been taken by Apaches.

He went immediately to Lieutenant Colonel Pitcairn Morrison at Fort Buchanan and believing that his stepson had been taken by Chiricahua Apaches, insisted on military intervention. Second Lieutenant George Nicholas Bascom, acting on orders set out on January 28 to find the trail. In the morning he could not locate it. In the afternoon, he located a trail leading east toward Chiricahua country and Apache Pass.

Bascom, commander of Company C, 7th Infantry, knew from experience that only Chiricahua would go east. What he did not realize was that the opening of Fort Breckinridge on Aravaipa Creek and the San Pedro River in the Pinal homeland was forcing all raiders to go east. The events which followed became known as the Bascom Affair and triggered the Chiricahua Wars.

On 4 February 1861, on orders to retrieve the child at all costs, Bascom went to Apache Pass to seek out Cochise, son-in-law of Mangas Coloradas. Cochise said he didn't have the child but thought he knew who did and if given ten days could bring him in. Bascom had the Apaches surrounded, informing Cochise they would be held as hostages until the child was returned. Cochise escaped and captured his own hostages to offer in exchange, but Bascom refused. A series of violent retaliatory actions followed from each side before the Chiricahua Apaches eventually declared war.

Telles was adopted and raised by Nayundiie, a White Mountain Apache, and became foster brother to Tlol-dil-zil, later known as John Rope. Telles participated in Apache tribal tobacco smoking ceremonies when he was accepted into the White Mountain Apache Tribe, and he smoked tobacco with a medicine man.

== Scout for the US Army ==
He joined the U.S. Army's Apache Scouts on 2 December 1872 as a scout and within two years he was promoted to the rank of sergeant. He was posted to Camp Verde to serve as an interpreter, where he met Al Sieber.

Because the soldiers could not pronounce the Scouts' names, they gave them nicknames. Due to his red hair and other features, the soldiers claimed the scout named Feliz, bore a resemblance to a character in Charles Lever's 1840 novel, Charles O'Malley: The Irish Dragoon named "Mickey Free".

Free served as a scout for George Crook in the pursuit of Geronimo and Nana. He accompanied Crook on his expedition to the Sierra Madres in 1883 and accompanied Chatto and other Apaches on a visit to Washington, D.C., in 1886. He left the scouts in 1893.

In his time as a bounty hunter, Free tracked the Apache Kid, who at one point had a $15,000 reward on his head. Free pursued a bounty for the Apache renegade Massai, but Free never caught Massai.

== Later life and death ==
After leaving the Army, Free moved to the Fort Apache Indian Reservation with the remainder of the White Mountain Apache Scouts and lived out the rest of his life as a farmer until his death in 1914. Free married two White Mountain Apache women at the same time named Ethlay and Ochehey. Polygamy was customary among the various Apache tribes. He married four times and had two sons and two daughters.

== Bibliography ==
- Ayers, Steve (2010). Camp Verde. Arcadia. ISBN 978-0738579122.
- Bourke, John Gregory (2003). Charles M. Robinson (ed.). The Diaries of John Gregory Bourke: November 20, 1872-July 28, 1876. University of North Texas. ISBN 978-1574411614.
- Chamberlain, Kathleen P. (2007). Victorio: Apache Warrior and Chief. University of Oklahoma. ISBN 978-0806138435.
- Griffith, A. Kinney (1969). Mickey Free, manhunter (1st ed.). Caldwell Idaho Caxton Printers. ISBN 978-0870041303.
- Heard, Joseph N. (1997). Handbook of the American Frontier: The far west. Scarecrow. ISBN 978-0810832831.
- Hayes, Celia. "Mickey Free – Apache Indian Scout".
- Kessel, William B. (2001). William B. Kessel, Robert Wooster (ed.). Encyclopedia of Native American Wars and Warfare. Facts on File. ISBN 978-0816033379.
- Mort, Terry (2013). The Wrath of Cochise: The Bascom Affair and the Origins of the Apache Wars. Pegasus. ISBN 978-1605984223.
- Radbourne, Allan (2005). Mickey Free, Apache Captive, Interpreter, and Indian Scout. Tucson: The Arizona Historical Society.
- Rope, John (1971). Keith H. Basso (ed.). Western Apache Raiding and Warfare. University of Arizona Press. ISBN 978-0816502974.
- Sweeney, Edwin R. (1991). Cochise: Chiricahua Apache Chief. University of Oklahoma Press. ISBN 978-0806126067.
- Thrapp, Dan L. (1991). Encyclopedia Frontier Biography: A-F. University of Nebraska. ISBN 978-0803294189.
- Worcester, Donald E. (1979). The Apaches: Eagles of the Southwest. University of Oklahoma Press. ISBN 978-0806114958.
