= William Phillips =

William Phillips may refer to:

== Entertainment ==
- William Phillips (editor) (1907–2002), American editor and co-founder of Partisan Review
- William T. Phillips (1863–1937), American author
- William Phillips (director), Canadian film-maker who wrote and directed the film Gunless
- William Phillips (musician), Grammy-winning songwriter
- William Phillips (1864–1943), American character actor known as Tully Marshall
- Tourist (musician) (William Edward Phillips, born 1987), UK

== Politics ==
- William Phillips Sr. (1722–1804), Boston merchant and politician
- William Phillips Jr. (1750–1827), lieutenant governor of Massachusetts, 1812–1823
- William Edward Phillips (fl. 1810–1826), governor of Penang
- William A. Phillips (1824–1893), American lawyer and politician
- William Phillips (diplomat) (1878–1968), U.S. diplomat, first United States ambassador to Canada
- William M. Phillips (1900–1962), Philadelphia city councilman

== Science ==
- William Phillips (geologist) (1775–1828), British mineralogist who founded the Geological Society of London
- William Phillips (botanist) (1822–1905), English botanist and antiquary
- William Dale Phillips (1925–1993), American chemist and member of the National Academy of Sciences
- William Daniel Phillips (born 1948), Nobel laureate physicist specializing in laser cooling of atoms

== Sports ==
- William David Phillips (1855–1918), Wales international rugby union player
- William Phillips (cricketer, born 1876) (1876–?), cricketer and test match umpire
- William Phillips (basketball) (born 1979), American basketball player
- William Phillips (water polo) (1943–2022), Australian water polo player
- Will Phillips (cricketer) (born 1993), English cricketer
- William Lloyd Phillips (1881–1966), Welsh gymnast
- William Phillips (sailor) (born 1987), Australian sailor
- Will Phillips (footballer) (born 1993), Australian rules footballer
- Bill Phillips (first baseman) (William B. Phillips, 1857–1900), Canadian baseball player
- Bill Phillips (pitcher) (William Corcoran Phillips, 1868–1941), American baseball pitcher and manager
- Bill Phillips (ice hockey) (William John Orville Phillips, 1902–1998), Canadian ice hockey player
- Bill Phillips (rugby union) (William John Phillips, 1914–1982), New Zealand rugby union player
- Billy Phillips (boxer) (William Gwyn Phillips (1936–2021), Welsh boxer
- Billy Phillips (soccer) (William L. Phillips, born 1956), American soccer player
- Willie Phillips (footballer) (William Nathaniel Phillips, 1911–1992), Scottish footballer

== Other ==
- William Phillips (British Army officer) (1731–1781), major-general in the American Revolutionary War
- William Eric Phillips (1893–1964), chairman and chief executive officer of Massey Ferguson
- William Phillips (gunman) (c. 1947–2007), responsible for a standoff with police at the Johnson Space Center, 2007
- William Garside Phillips (1849–1929), British pioneer in mining education
- Bill Phillips (author) (William Nathaniel Phillips, born 1964), American entrepreneur and author

== See also ==
- William Philipps (disambiguation)
- William Phillipps (disambiguation)
- Willie Phillips (disambiguation)
- Bill Phillips (disambiguation)
- William Phylip (1590–1670), Welsh poet
