= Bill Phillips =

Bill or Billy Phillips may refer to:

== Entertainment ==
- Bill Phillips (singer) (1936–2010), country music singer from the 1950s and 1960s
- Bill Phillips (author) (born 1964), fitness and nutrition author
- Billy Phillips (TV personality), Geordie Shore participant

== Sports ==
- Bill Phillips (first baseman) (1857–1900), Canadian baseball player
- Bill Phillips (pitcher) (1868–1941), American baseball pitcher and manager
- Bill Phillips (ice hockey) (1902–1998), ice hockey player
- Bill Phillips (rugby union) (1914–1982), New Zealand rugby union player
- Billy Phillips (soccer) (born 1956), American soccer player
- Billy Phillips (boxer), Welsh boxer
- Billy Phillips (rugby league) (born 2004), Australian rugby league footballer

== Other ==
- Bill Phillips (economist) (1914–1975), New Zealander known for the Phillips curve and Moniac hydraulic computer

== See also ==
- William Phillips (disambiguation)
