= BFL =

BFL can stand for:

- Bat for Lashes, the stage name of musician Natasha Khan
- Big Fat Liar, 2002 comedy film
- Brothers for Life, a gang in the south-western suburbs of Sydney, Australia.
- Bluefaced Leicester, a breed of sheep
- Body for Life, a fitness program created by Bill Phillips
- BFL Group, an Emirati retail company
- Bird fancier's lung, a type of hypersensitivity pneumonitis

== Aviation ==
- Meadows Field Airport in Bakersfield, California (IATA code: BFL)
- Buffalo Airways (ICAO code: BFL)

== Sports ==
- Ballarat Football League
- Bangladesh Football League
- Battlefield Fight League
- Belarusian First League
- Belgian Football League
- Bellarine Football League
- Bendigo Football League
