= Dan Duchaine =

American bodybuilder, steroid promoter (1952–2000)

Daniel Duchaine
- Born: Daniel Duchaine; 1952
- Died: January 12, 2000 (aged 47–48); Carlsbad, California
- Education: Boston University (B.A., Education 1975)
- Occupations: Columnist, writer
- Spouse(s): ???? (m. ??; div. ??) Ann Miller (m. 1988)
- Writing career
- Period: 1981–2000
- Notable works: The Underground Steroid Handbook; Underground Body Opus: Militant Weight Loss & Recomposition

Daniel Duchaine (1952 – January 12, 2000) was an American bodybuilder. Nicknamed the steroid guru, Duchaine gained worldwide notoriety due to his outspoken opinions on the use of performance-enhancing drugs, and made numerous television appearances discussing the subject on shows such as 20/20, Geraldo, and 60 Minutes. Steroid Nation author and ESPN writer Shaun Assael called Duchaine "a founding father of the steroid movement." Duchaine was a low-carbohydrate diet advocate and promoted his own diet, the "Bodyopus diet".

== Duchaine and steroids ==
Duchaine began competitive bodybuilding in his home state of Maine in 1977; however, after he had no luck (describing himself as a "miserable bodybuilder"), he began using anabolic steroids that he persuaded his family physician in Portland to prescribe as a training aid. However, after beginning their use he said "I still wasn't very good. Obviously something wasn't working, and the doctors and the pharmacists couldn't really answer my questions. So I started looking into steroids on my own." This was the start of the quest for knowledge that would eventually land him the title of "Guru" on the subject. He moved to Los Angeles in 1978.

In mid-1987, Duchaine was caught and indicted on conspiracy and mislabeling charges. He pleaded guilty to the two counts and was sentenced to a maximum of three years in federal prison with five years of probation by Judge J. Lawrence Irving of San Diego Federal Court. In November 1988 Duchaine was profiled by The New York Times on its front page as part of an Olympics-inspired series on steroids in sports.

Duchaine was released after ten months. In 1991, while still on probation he met up with a friend who was selling gamma-hydroxybutyrate (commonly known as GHB) and began working with him. One of their customers, however, was an undercover Food and Drug Administration (FDA) agent, and Duchaine was convicted a second time and sentenced to 36 months in prison. While in prison, he says he learned to make money through "legitimate avenues".

In 1988, Duchaine introduced clenbuterol to bodybuilders. Duchaine is also credited with introducing 2,4-dinitrophenol (DNP) into bodybuilding through an interview on one of ten cassettes included with bodybuilding magazine Muscle Media 2000. In 2007 Duchaine was featured prominently in the book Steroid Nation by ESPN writer Shaun Assael.

== Writing career ==
First published in 1981, Duchaine's The Underground Steroid Handbook was:

an 18-page pamphlet [...] which focused on bodybuilders who used the drugs for competition, defined the different types of steroids, and explained what they looked like, what they should cost, where to get them, and how to use them.

After placing ads in fitness and martial-arts magazines, as well as Soldier of Fortune, he printed and sold between 40,000 and 50,000 copies of the Underground Steroid Handbook at $6 a copy, over a four-year period. In 1988 Robert Voy, the chief medical officer of the United States Olympic Committee (USOC), called it "a fabulous pharmacological text." Both Voy and Don Catlin, the lead drug tester for USOC and the National Collegiate Athletic Association in the 1980s, used the book as a reference.

In 1992, after being released from prison for a second time, Duchaine began writing a monthly Q&A column called "Ask the Guru", in Bill Phillips' Muscle Media 2000 magazine. By this time Duchaine had published several books in The Underground Steroid Handbook series (co-authored with Michael Zumpano), and referred to himself as a "Human Performance Theorist".

Duchaine was a low-carbohydrate diet advocate. In his 1996 book Underground Bodyopus: Militant Weight Loss & Recomposition, Duchaine advocated a ketogenic diet known as the "Bodyopus diet".

Duchaine also helped bootstrapping the writing career of Michael D. Gundill (coauthor of several strength training and anatomy books with Frédéric Delavier).

== Death ==
Duchaine was found dead on January 12, 2000, by his close friend Shelley Hominuk in his apartment in Carlsbad, California. Cause of death was complications resulting from polycystic kidney disease.

== Quotes ==
- "If you can't grow on Deca and Dbol, you can't grow on anything!" – taken from Duchaine's Dirty Dieting Newsletter in 1997

== Duchaine's books ==
- Duchaine, Dan. The Original Underground Steroid Handbook, 1981
- Duchaine, Dan. Underground Steroid Handbook, 1983
- Duchaine, Dan. Underground Steroid Handbook II HLR Technical Books, 1988.
- Duchaine, Dan. Underground Body Opus: Militant Weight Loss & Recomposition XIPE Press, March 1996. (ISBN 0-9653107-0-1)

== See also ==
- Experimental and Applied Sciences
