= William Phillipps =

William Phillipps may refer to:

- William Herbert Phillipps, South Australian businessman and philanthropist
- William J. Phillipps, New Zealand ichthyologist

== See also ==
- William Philipps (disambiguation)
- William Phillips (disambiguation)
