= Shaun Assael =

American author and investigative journalist

- Born: February 4, 1962 (age 64); New York City, New York, U.S.
- Education: New York University, 1983
- Occupations: Magazine Writer, Author
- Website: shaunassael.com

Shaun Assael (born February 4, 1962) is an American author and award-winning investigative journalist. He is the author of four books that deal with sports, crime and culture.

== Journalist ==
After graduating from New York University with a degree in journalism and political science in 1983, Shaun went to work as a crime and court reporter for newspapers in Florida. Next, he covered state prisons for the Journal News (a Gannett Westchester newspaper) and New York courts for the weekly Manhattan Lawyer (then part of American Lawyer Media).

=== Freelancer ===
As a freelancer, Shaun was a regular contributor to The Village Voice, The New York Observer, and 7 Days magazine. His work has appeared in publications such as The New York Times, Esquire, New York, Smart Money, Maxim, Men's Fitness, Rolling Stone, Board Member, and The Daily Beast. A July 2007 Glamour (magazine) feature about the 1979 gang rape and murder of Hope College student Janet Chandler won a third place national Headliner Award for Magazine Writing & Reporting.

=== ESPN ===
Shaun Assael joined the development team that launched ESPN The Magazine in March 1998. As a senior writer, he has covered a wide range of subjects with a focus on crime reporting, including: the Securitas depot robbery, the largest cash robbery in British History pulled off by UFC star "Lightning" Lee Murray; the 2015 FIFA corruption case, and NFL pro Marvin Harrison's involvement in a shooting incident in Philadelphia. His profile of Indianapolis Colts owner Jim Irsay's battle with drugs was listed in USA Today For the Win's list of top sports stories of 2014.

Dubbed the magazine's "longtime steroid expert" by the Wall Street Journal, Assael has covered some of the sport world's most notorious scandals involving performance-enhancing drugs. In December 2004, his interview with BALCO Labs founder Victor Conte revealed Conte's allegations of PED use by Olympic track and field athlete Marion Jones. On December 13, 2007, Assael broke the news that Yankees pitcher Roger Clemens would be implicated in the Mitchell Report in a story dictated to his editor from the backseat of a taxi. For an ESPN special report on steroids in Major League Baseball, Assael, along with colleagues Peter Keating and Jon Pessah, took first place for magazine writing and reporting of a major news event in the 2006 National Headliner Award.

As a member of ESPN's Enterprise Unit, he is a regular contributor to ESPN network's Outside the Lines and has made appearances on E:60. His 2015 Outside the Lines investigation of the suspicious hanging death of a North Carolina teen Lennon Lacy won the Bronze World Medal for best sports journalism at the 2016 New York Festival TV & Film Awards, third place in the 2016 National Headliner Award for sports or human interest feature, and a Silver Radio winner for documentary on social issues from the 2016 World's Best Radio Competition.

== Author ==
Shaun Assael's first book, published in 1998 by Ballantine Books, is Wide Open: Days and Nights on the NASCAR Tour. He followed racers Brett Bodine, Dave Marcis, and Bobby Hamilton during all thirty-one races of the 1996 Winston Cup Tour. It provides an insider view of the physical, financial, and mental risks and rewards for the drivers, the crews, and their families. Assael's first exposure to the NASCAR scene was covering Jeff Gordon late in the 1995 season.

His second book, Sex, Lies, and Headlocks: The Real Story of Vince McMahon and World Wrestling Entertainment was written with former Charleston Post and Courier wrestling columnist Mike Mooneyham and published by Crown Publishers in 2002. A behind-the-scenes look at World Wrestling Entertainment, it chronicles the on and off-screen drama of its stars, including its founder Vince McMahon. Called an "essential read for both fans and enemies of pro wrestling" by Publishers Weekly, the book was a New York Times bestseller.

Steroid Nation, his third book, is the culmination of his years of research and reporting on drug scandals in professional sports. Published in 2007 by ESPN Books, it chronicles the life of steroid "guru" Dan Duchaine, author of The Underground Steroid Handbook, and the emergence of the war on drugs in sports.

His most recent book, The Murder of Sonny Liston: Las Vegas, Heroin, and Heavyweights was published by Blue Rider Press in October 2016.

== Works ==
- Wide Open: Days and Nights on the NASCAR Tour (1998) ISBN 978-0756777500
- Sex, Lies, and Headlocks: The Real Story of Vince McMahon and World Wrestling Entertainment (2002) ISBN 978-0609606902
- Steroid Nation: Juiced Home Run Totals, Anti-aging Miracles, and a Hercules in Every High School: The Secret History of America's True Drug Addiction (2007) ISBN 978-1933060378
- The Murder of Sonny Liston: Las Vegas, Heroin, and Heavyweights (2016) ISBN 978-0399169755
