= W. C. Jameson =

American singer/songwriter

W.C. Jameson
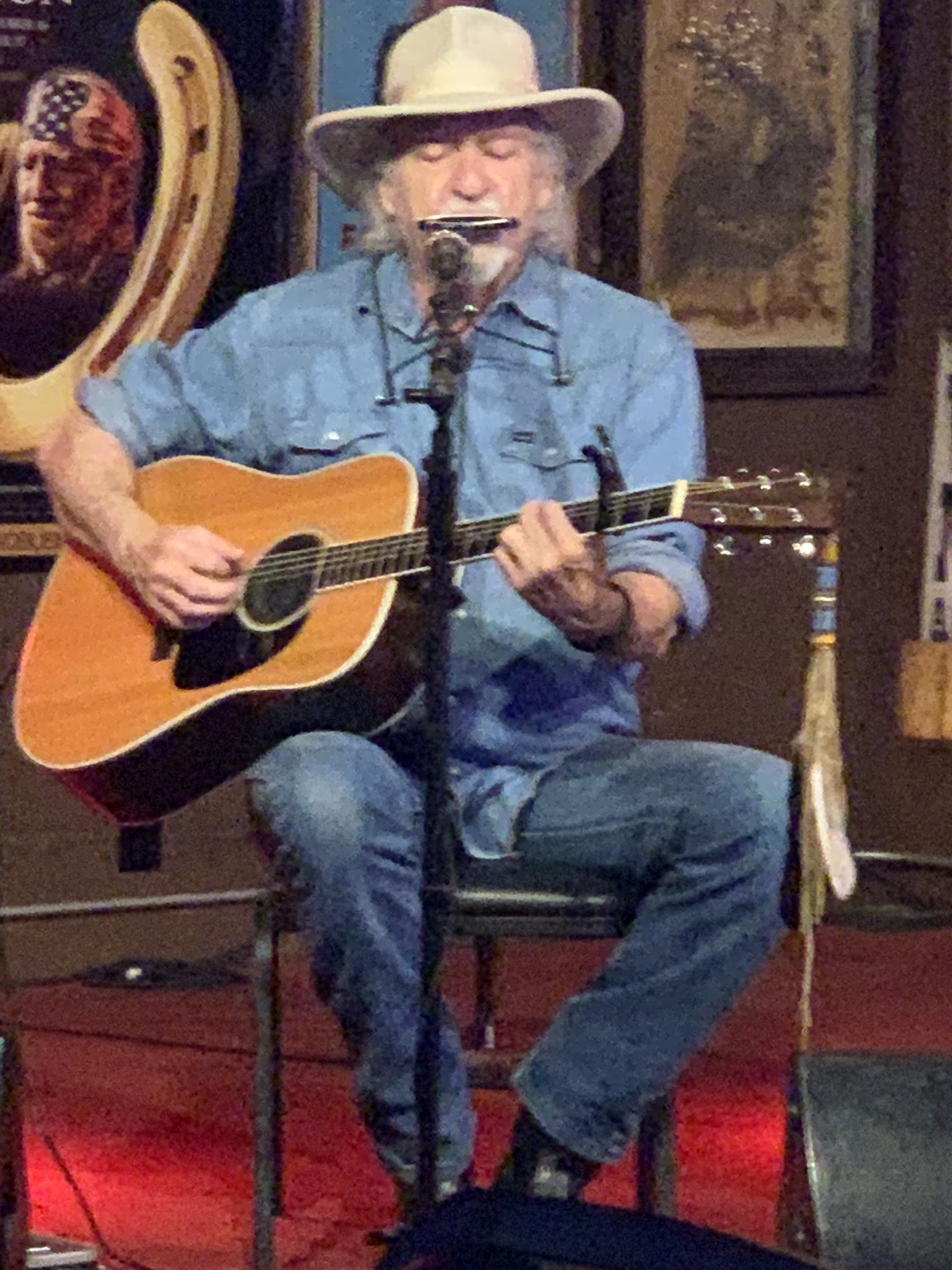
- W.C. Jameson at Poodies Roadhouse

Background information
- Born: William Carl Jameson; December 22, 1942 (age 83); Washington D.C., U.S.
- Genres: Country; Western
- Occupations: Singer; songwriter; actor; musician; author; treasurer hunter
- Instruments: Guitar; harmonica; vocals
- Years active: 1960–Present
- Website: www.wc-jameson.com

William Carl Jameson (born December 22, 1942), known professionally as W. C. Jameson, is an American writer, author, singer/songwriter, and professional treasure hunter. His writings focus mainly on American Western subjects. A son of William Sims Jameson (1914–1976) and Lea Savoy (1907–2008), he was born in Washington, D.C.

== Career ==
W. C. Jameson is the author of at least fifty books, over a thousand articles, columns and essays, and several hundred poems and songs. He has written the score for two PBS documentaries and one feature film. An accomplished songwriter and performer, he has recorded five CDs of his original music and acted in several movies. His notable books include the Beyond the Grave series about notorious killers Billy the Kid, John Wilkes Booth, and Butch Cassidy.

Jameson's Buried Treasures of America series has made him the world's best-selling author of books about buried treasure. His success and fame as a professional treasure hunter have led to appearances on television's Unsolved Mysteries, the Travel Channel, the Discovery Channel, Nightline, and NPR.

He gives talks, lectures, programs and seminars at corporate functions, college and university campuses, clubs, writing conferences, and poetry gatherings. His topics include aspects of his life as a professional treasure hunter, his life as a writer in many genres, and the writing process.

== Honors and awards ==
W. C. Jameson is a past president of the Western Writers of America (1994–1996), and has twice won their Stirrup Award for best magazine article. His song "When Roy Rogers was Around" was selected by WWA members as one of the top 100 western songs of all time. In 1999 he was named Songwriter of the Year by the Texas Folk Music Guild.
