= William T. Phillips =

American imposter (1863–1937)

William T. Phillips (1863 – 1937) was a writer from Spokane, Washington, best remembered for The Bandit Invincible, a biography of the outlaw Butch Cassidy. A copy of the book is held at the American Heritage Center at the University of Wyoming. Phillips claimed to have known Cassidy since childhood, and stated in his book that Butch Cassidy's real name was not Robert Parker.

In his 1977 book In Search of Butch Cassidy, Larry Pointer speculated that Phillips was actually Cassidy, based upon stories in The Bandit Invincible and a resemblance between the two men.

However, in 2012, Larry Pointer stated that the original, unabridged manuscript of The Bandit Invincible had been brought to him for authentication by a collector in Utah. In the manuscript, he found previously unknown references to an associate of Butch Cassidy's by the name of William T. Wilcox, who was described as having been in Wyoming Territorial Prison with Butch Cassidy. Given the name's similarity with "William T. Phillips," he searched for a prison mugshot of Wilcox. After he received one and observed the similarities between the two men, Pointer revised his previous theory and concluded that Phillips was in fact Wilcox, instead of Butch Cassidy.
