= EAS (nutrition brand) =

Sports nutrition company

EAS Sports Nutrition
- Company type: Subsidiary
- Industry: Nutritional supplements
- Founded: 1992; 34 years ago, in Monterey County, California, U.S.
- Founder: Anthony Almada; Ed Byrd
- Headquarters: Columbus, Ohio, U.S.
- Key people: Bill Phillips (former CEO)
- Products: Creatine monohydrate, dietary and sports supplements
- Parent: Abbott Laboratories

EAS Sports Nutrition (formerly Experimental & Applied Sciences) was a distributor of creatine nutritional supplements with approximately 300 staff, annual sales exceeding $300 million, and offices/distributors in 54 countries.

== History ==
EAS was founded in Pacific Grove, Monterey County, California in 1992 by biochemist Anthony Almada, and businessman Ed Byrd. In 2012, Byrd founded EAB Lab. After discovering the possible benefits for athletes of creatine monohydrate supplementation, in December 1992 they acquired a kilogram of creatine and began trials.

In 1993, they released the first commercially available creatine supplement intended specifically for strength and muscle enhancement under the EAS brand name Phosphagain. The product caught the eye of Bill Phillips, publisher of Muscle Media 2000 (usually referred to as "MM2K"), and he began to write about its benefits in the Natural Supplement Review and his subscriber-based newsletters. In 1994 he purchased EAS from Almada and Byrd, and was 100% owner of EAS until the sale to North Castle Partners.

Phillips' subscriber base was the platform in which to tout his new acquisition. He promoted the company's products through heavy editorial-style advertisements in MM2K. Led by products like Myoplex Protein Supplement, Phosphagen and HMB, this eventually made EAS significant in the nutritional supplement industry.

In 1999, North Castle Partners purchased EAS for $160 million. Phillips retained about a third of the company, which he sold in 2004.

In 2005, EAS was purchased by Abbott Laboratories for approximately $320 million in a cash-for-stock transaction and existed as a solely-owned division of Abbott. The refreshed product line focused on sports bars, drink mixes, and similar products. Abbott expanded the range of stores offering EAS products from niche stores such as GNC to mainstream stores such as Walmart and Target.

In March 2011, Abbott laboratories removed the EAS brand from international markets and ceased European production of EAS products. This included the closing of the Canadian and UK country businesses and regional distribution in Europe, Australia, and New Zealand along.

In August 2018, the brand was discontinued by Abbott Laboratories.

== Product brands ==
- Myoplex Protein Supplement brand products
- Phosphagen (creatine monohydrate)

== See also ==
- Abbott Laboratories
- Body for Life
- MET-Rx
