= William Philipps =

William Philipps may refer to:

- William Philipps (MP for Haverfordwest) (c. 1615–c. 1689), Welsh politician
- William Philipps (MP for Bath) (died 1444), English politician
- William Philipps (MP for Pembrokeshire) for 1559, MP for Pembrokeshire

== See also ==
- William Phillips (disambiguation)
- William Phillipps (disambiguation)
