= Wyoming Territorial Prison State Historic Site =

- Wyoming Territorial Penitentiary
- U.S. National Register of Historic Places
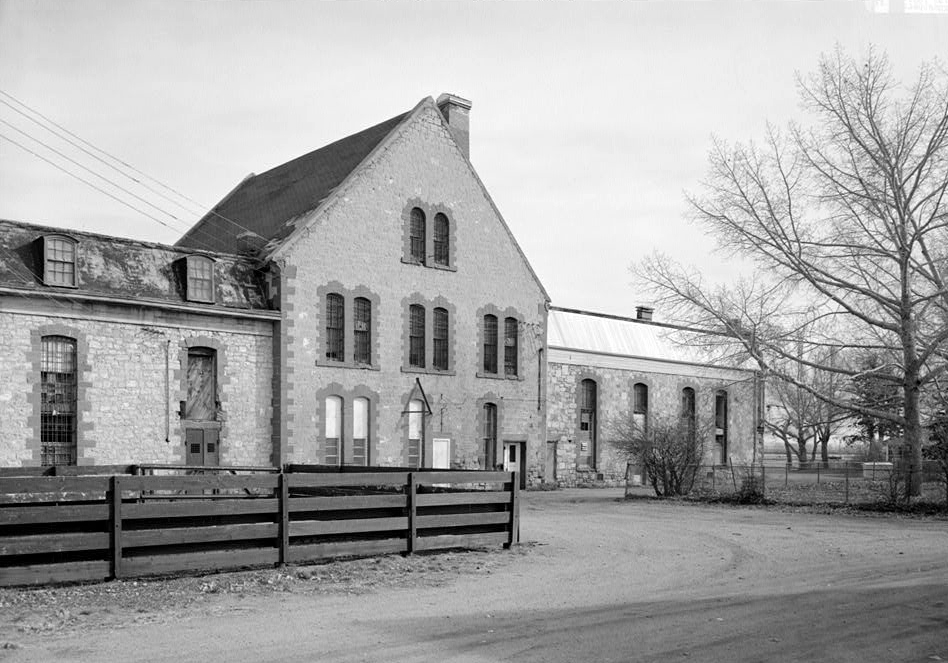
- Main building

- Location within Wyoming Location within the United States
- Location: 975 Snowy Range Road, Laramie, Wyoming
- Coordinates: 41°18′45″N 105°36′32″W
- Area: 1.5 acres (0.61 ha)
- Built: 1872
- Architect: Livingston and Schram; et al.
- Architectural style: Queen Anne, High Victorian Italianate
- NRHP reference No.: 78002815
- Added to NRHP: March 29, 1978

The Wyoming Territorial Prison is a former federal government prison near Laramie, Wyoming. Built in 1872, it is one of the oldest buildings in Wyoming. It operated as a federal penitentiary from 1872 to 1890, and as a state prison from 1890 to 1901. It was then transferred to the University of Wyoming and was used as an agricultural experiment station until 1989. In 1991, the facility was opened to the public, and in 2004, it was designated as Wyoming Territorial Prison State Historic Site.

== History ==
The prison was built in 1872 and began accepting prisoners in early 1873. The facility had problems from the outset, with a fire in 1873 and recurrent jailbreaks. Of the 44 prisoners accepted in the first two years of operation, 11 escaped. By 1877, the prison was overcrowded. As the prison filled, its reputation worsened, and it became less used, being considered more appropriate for those with light sentences. During the 1880s the prison was under capacity, with as few as three prisoners at one time. However, in 1889, a second cellblock was constructed, expanding capacity to 150 and providing a central kitchen, dining hall, guards' rooms and steam heat. There were at least five cells for female inmates, and several solitary confinement cells. In 1890 Wyoming became a state and the facility was transferred to the new state, which already had planned a new facility in Rawlins. Butch Cassidy was incarcerated here in 1894–1896. Prisoners were transferred to Rawlins in 1901; the prison was closed in 1903 and given to the University of Wyoming.

The university operated the property to conduct experiments in livestock breeding until 1989. In 1991, the property opened to the public. In 2004, it was established as Wyoming Territorial Prison State Historic Site. It was listed on the National Register of Historic Places on March 29, 1978.

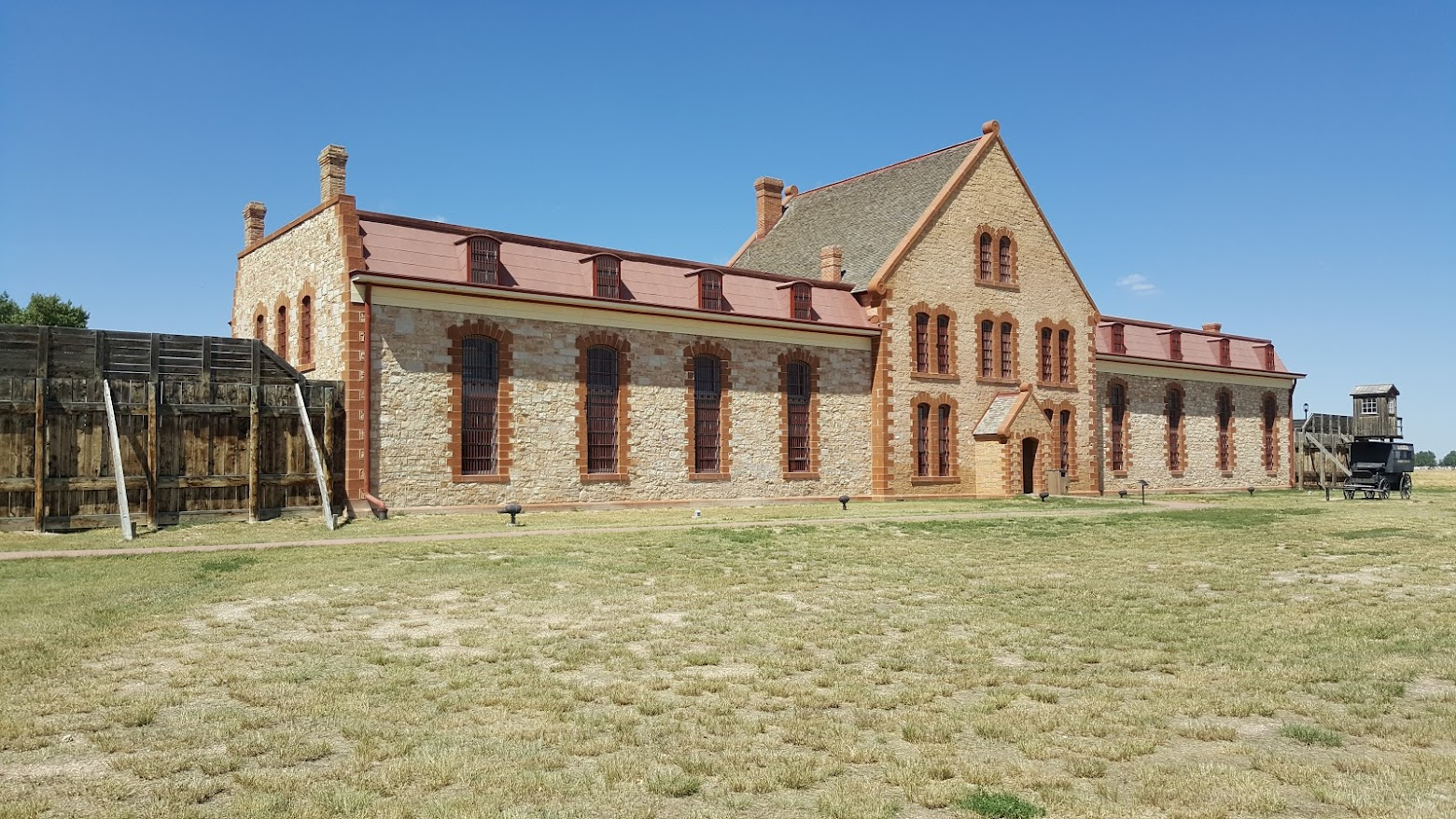
Main building in 2016

== Description ==
When it was built, the Wyoming Territorial Penitentiary stood apart from Laramie on the west side of the town, surrounded by open land. The principal buildings are built of rough gray sandstone, embellished by brown sandstone quoining and arches. The original cellblock measured about 40 feet (12 m) by 70 feet (21 m), a mansard roofed rectangular building with a prominent, steeply pitched cross-gable. Tall windows with dormers above illuminate the interior, where most of the cellblocks have been removed and the space adapted to house animals. The original plan consisted of three tiers of cells, each tier with 14 8-foot (2.4 m) square cells, heated by fireplaces at either end of the cellblock. The prison was enclosed by a wooden fence, 12 feet (3.7 m) high.

The warden's residence was built in 1875 by convicts. The stucco-covered stone structure later housed the superintendent of the stock farm. The interior, which once had 12-foot (3.7 m) ceilings, has been much altered. It was connected to the main building by a tunnel for steam pipes.
