= Body for Life =

Nutrition and exercise program and competition

Body for Life (BFL) is a 12-week nutrition and exercise program, and also an annual physique transformation competition. The program utilizes a low-fat high-protein diet. It was created by Bill Phillips, a former competitive bodybuilder and previous owner of EAS, a manufacturer of nutritional supplements. It has been popularized by a bestselling book of the same name.

Medical experts have described Body for Life as being effective, if difficult to follow.

== Exercise ==
The human body adapts itself to changes in nutritional intake. If the calorie intake is reduced, the body responds by slowing down its metabolism, and by burning muscle in preference to fat. This reduces the metabolism long-term. When the diet comes to an end and normal calorie intake is restored, the individual starts to gain weight even faster than before. This is known as yo-yo dieting. Diets that focus exclusively on calorie reduction often fail in this way.

With these concerns in mind, Body for Life addresses energy expenditure (i.e. exercise) in addition to energy input. For best results, Body for Life holds that this exercise should include weight training to build skeletal muscle and increase the metabolism over the long term. This also helps to maximise the energy expenditure and fat loss from aerobic exercise.

Body for Life's exercise program is more complicated than its diet program. It suggests exercising six days a week, normally Monday to Saturday, for 45 minutes and alternating between weight training and aerobic exercise. The seventh day, usually Sunday, is a rest day (referred to as the "free day", during which no exercise is done and unhealthy, normally fatty foods may be eaten). Weight training sessions alternate between exercises for the upper body and exercises for the lower body. This allows the exercised muscles enough time to recover fully before the next training session. Each fortnight follows the same pattern:

Intensity index

Body for Life uses Gunnar Borg's Rating of Perceived Exertion (known as the Borg scale) for assessing the intensity of exercise based on how hard you feel you are working. It uses the variant developed by the American College of Sports Medicine, which uses a scale of 0 to 10:

- 0 is no exertion at all.
- 2 corresponds to very light exercise. For a healthy person, this is like walking slowly at their own pace for several minutes.
- 5 on the scale is somewhat hard exercise, but it still feels OK to continue.
- 8 is very strenuous. A healthy person can still go on, but they really have to push themselves. It feels very heavy, and the person is very tired.
- 9 on the scale is an extremely strenuous exercise level. For most people this is the most strenuous exercise they have ever experienced.
- 10 is maximal exertion: an all-out, 100% effort.

These levels accommodate differences in fitness. An unfit individual may require a level 10 effort to walk briskly uphill, whereas for a competitive athlete this may only be a level 3 effort. Over the course of the 12-week Body for Life program an individual would get noticeably fitter, so their intensity scale needs to be adjusted over time.

Body for Life uses a "wave" pattern, periodically building up from level 5 to level 9 or 10 during an exercise session. This allows the muscles to warm up, and gives the body a chance to build up to a "high point" of maximal exertion. Brief but intense exercise provides maximum stimulus for the body to build strength and endurance, but without the risk of overtraining.

=== Weight training ===
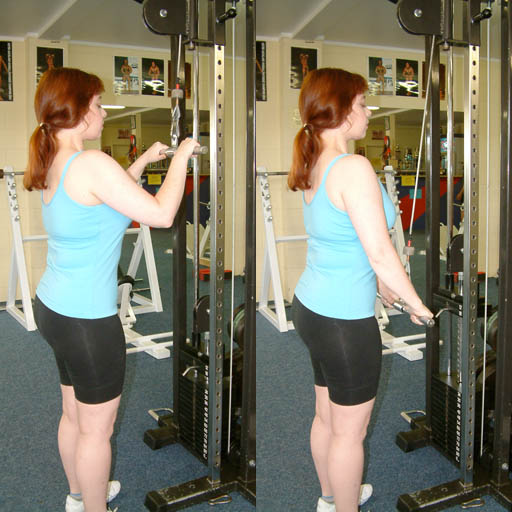
The pushdown is used to exercise the triceps muscle.

Exercises for upper-body muscle groups include:

- "Pecs" (chest), e.g., bench press, pec-deck, incline fly.
- "Lats" (upper back), e.g., pull-down, bent-over row, dumbbell pullover.
- Deltoids (shoulders), e.g., upright row, shoulder press, lateral raise.
- Triceps (rear arms), e.g., push-down, triceps kickback, bench dip.
- Biceps (front arms), e.g., biceps curl, concentration curl, hammer curl.

Exercises for lower-body muscle groups include:

- Quadriceps (front legs), e.g., squat, leg press, leg extension.
- Hamstrings (rear legs), e.g., leg curl, lunge, glute-ham raise.
- Calves e.g., standing calf raise, seated calf raise.
- "Abs" (torso), e.g., crunch, reverse crunch, leg raise.

Most of these exercises can be performed using either dumbbells, a barbell, a Smith machine, a cable machine with adjustable pulleys or a specially designed apparatus. Two exercises should be chosen for each muscle group. Five sets of the first exercise are performed, and then one set of the second. Weights for each set should be chosen so that the specified number of repetitions can be achieved at the specified level of intensity. For example: Weight training sessions proceed at a brisk pace, with one minute of rest between the first four sets for a muscle group, and no rest between the final two sets. The cadence for each repetition should be one second to lift the weight (while exhaling deeply), one second holding it at the top, two seconds to lower the weight (while inhaling deeply) and then one second pausing before the next repetition. Each session should be completed within about 45 minutes.

=== Aerobic exercise ===
Most forms of aerobic exercise are suitable. Common choices include walking or running (perhaps on a treadmill), cycling, swimming, or the use of a rowing machine or cross-trainer. However, exercise classes are generally not suitable, unless they are specifically designed to suit Body for Life.

Aerobic exercise sessions are limited to 20 minutes duration. They compensate for this by following the same "wave" pattern of steadily increasing intensity just like the weight training sessions. The aerobic, often referred to as cardio, sessions are a modified High Intensity Interval Training (HIIT).

During the first 2 minutes, intensity should be at 5. Minutes 3, 4, 5, and 6 should be at intensity levels 6, 7, 8, and 9 respectively. Minute 7 goes back down to 6 intensity level and continues the wave pattern until the 19th minute where you push intensity level to 10. The last minute is a cool down to 5 intensity. You should be completely exhausted at this point so stretch afterwards.

Phillips maintains that aerobic exercise is more effective for fat loss when done first thing in the morning, because it raises the metabolism for the remainder of the day, and because the body draws more heavily on its fat stores after fasting overnight.

== Diet ==
BFL promotes a low-fat high-protein diet.

Another key aspect of BFL is consuming a diet that is low enough in caloric intake to cause fat loss, while providing enough calories and protein to build muscle and cardiovascular endurance. In addition, BFL attempts to make choosing portion sizes and food as easy as possible to avoid overcomplication. The major aspects of the diet program include:

- Eating 6 smaller meals per day instead of the standard 3 large meals. BFL (along with some dietary experts) maintain that eating smaller, more frequent meals throughout the day will boost the body's metabolism, causing it to burn fat faster.
- Eating one "portion" of carbohydrates and one "portion" of protein at each meal. To keep determining portion sizes simple, BFL suggests that one "portion" of carbohydrates should equal a potato or ball of rice roughly equal to the size of the person's clenched fist. Additionally, one "portion" of protein would roughly equal a piece of meat the size of the person's palm and as thick as a deck of cards.
- Consuming vegetables with at least two meals per day.
- Taking a good multi-vitamin.
- Limiting consumption of butter, cheese, mayonnaise, alcoholic beverages, and high fat salad dressings.
- Allowance of one "free day" each week. A free day is one day a week in which the person is allowed to make dietary choices that do not correspond with the BFL eating program. Although this should not be a day to binge eat junk food, BFL encourages people to eat whatever foods or desserts they desire on this day. According to Bill Phillips, this allows the body to avoid the Starvation response and gives the dieter a chance to avoid cheating since they know they simply have to wait until their free day to have what they crave.

Body for Life also encourages people to eat mostly lean meats like chicken, fish, and turkey, as well as tofu. Carbohydrates that are multi-grain and unrefined are also encouraged. Bill Phillips encourages people to adopt this eating program as a lifestyle, and not as a temporary diet. Although the amount of protein eaten should be enough for some people to build good muscle mass, some observe that high-protein shakes and meal bars should be consumed to increase protein intake. Not surprisingly, the program suggests consuming protein products from EAS.

== Reception ==
No scientific research has been done on Body for Life.

The Body for Life program has been described by some as a hard to follow program that is effective at losing weight and building muscle.

While criticized by some as a fad diet, the "program's success is based on testimonials and anecdotal evidence", it differs from many fad diets because it can be sustained.

The program's dependence on extensive exercise (45 minute workouts, six days a week), means it is not suitable for everyone.

The high-protein content of the diet has been criticized. The Gale Encyclopedia of Diets, notes that:

The thing nutritionists tend to criticize most strongly, however, is the perceived need for dietary supplements in this program. Bill Phillips, the originator of Body for Life, used to unabashedly recommend dieters use EAS supplements, a company Bill Phillips was CEO of, to achieve better results. Since he sold EAS, he no longer recommends those products. He now recommends his products sold in the Bill Phillips Fitness Store at eatingright.com. Many nutritionists feel that a good, healthy diet should not require protein shakes and other supplements beyond perhaps a multivitamin for certain dieters.

== See also ==
- List of diets

== Body for Life books and videos ==
- Phillips, Bill. Body for Life: 12 Weeks to Mental and Physical Strength. HarperCollins, 1999. (ISBN 0-06-019339-5)
- Phillips, Bill. Body for Life Success Journal. HarperCollins, 2002. (ISBN 0-06-051559-7)
- Phillips, Bill. Eating for Life: Your Guide to Great Health, Fat Loss and Increased Energy! High Point Media, 2003 (ISBN 0-9720184-1-7)
- Body of Work. Seventh Dream Pictures, 1998. (ASIN B0001H9T72)
