= Battlefield Fight League =

Mixed martial arts promotion company

- Type: Private
- Industry: Mixed martial arts promotion
- Founded: 15 May 2010; 16 years ago
- Founder: Jay Golshani, Trevor Carroll
- Headquarters: Vancouver, BC, Canada
- Website: battlefieldfl.com

Battlefield Fight League (BFL) is a mixed martial arts organization based in Canada. Since its founding, it has established itself as the largest Canadian MMA promoter.

== History ==
Before the founding of the BFL, MMA was banned in Vancouver; however, the organization followed other provinces in fully legalizing the sport in Canada. In 2010, the promotion was founded by Jay Golshani and Trevor Carroll.

Battlefield Fight League held its inaugural BFL 1 event on May 15, 2010, at Rocky Mountaineer Station in Vancouver.

In 2024, BFL renewed its contract with UFC Fight Pass, which it had signed three years earlier, to broadcast fights.

== Events ==
List of Battlefield Fight League events
Event	Date	Venue	Location	Ref.
BFL 1	May 15, 2010	Rocky Mountaineer Station	Vancouver, British Columbia, Canada	
BFL 2	August 21, 2010	River Rock Casino Resort	Richmond, British Columbia, Canada	
BFL 3	October 15, 2010	River Rock Casino Resort	Richmond, British Columbia, Canada	
BFL 4	October 22, 2010	Edgewater Casino	Vancouver, British Columbia, Canada	
BFL 5: Duel	January 15, 2011	River Rock Casino Resort	Richmond, British Columbia, Canada	
BFL 6: Over the Edge	March 12, 2011	Edgewater Casino	Vancouver, British Columbia, Canada	
BFL 7: Invasion	March 25, 2011	Frank Crane Arena	Nanaimo, British Columbia, Canada	
BFL 8: Island Beatdown	May 28, 2011	Frank Crane Arena	Nanaimo, British Columbia, Canada	
BFL 9: Quest	July 16, 2011	Vancouver Convention Centre	Vancouver, British Columbia, Canada	
BFL 10: War	August 20, 2011	Wesbild Centre	Vernon, British Columbia, Canada	
BFL 11	September 17, 2011	Hard Rock Casino	Coquitlam, British Columbia, Canada	
BFL 12	November 18, 2011	Vogue Theatre	Vancouver, British Columbia, Canada	
BFL 13: Uprising	January 20, 2012	Vogue Theatre	Vancouver, British Columbia, Canada	
BFL 14	February 24, 2012	Vogue Theatre	Vancouver, British Columbia, Canada	
BFL 15: Hinchliffe vs. Huveneers II	April 27, 2012	Frank Crane Arena	Nanaimo, British Columbia, Canada	
BFL 16: Downtown Beatdown	May 25, 2012	Vogue Theatre	Vancouver, British Columbia, Canada	
BFL 17: Heat Wave	July 28, 2012	Penticton Trade and Convention Centre	Penticton, British Columbia, Canada	
BFL 18	September 15, 2012	Vancouver Convention Centre	Vancouver, British Columbia, Canada	
BFL 19	November 9, 2012	Penticton Trade and Convention Centre	Penticton, British Columbia, Canada	
BFL 20	November 24, 2012	Vogue Theatre	Vancouver, British Columbia, Canada	
BFL 21	February 16, 2013	Penticton Trade and Convention Centre	Penticton, British Columbia, Canada	
BFL 22	February 22, 2013	Vogue Theatre	Vancouver, British Columbia, Canada	
BFL 23	May 25, 2013	Vancouver Trade & Convention Centre	Vancouver, British Columbia, Canada	
BFL 24	June 8, 2013	Penticton Trade and Convention Centre	Penticton, British Columbia, Canada	
BFL 25	September 7, 2013	River Rock Casino Resort	Richmond, British Columbia, Canada	
BFL 26	December 7, 2013	River Rock Casino Resort	Richmond, British Columbia, Canada	
BFL 27	January 18, 2014	River Rock Casino	Richmond, British Columbia, Canada	
BFL 28	March 14, 2014	River Rock Casino Resort	Richmond, British Columbia, Canada	
BFL 29	March 29, 2014	Hard Rock Casino	Coquitlam, British Columbia, Canada	
BFL 30	May 23, 2014	River Rock Casino	Richmond, British Columbia, Canada	
BFL 31	July 12, 2014	Hard Rock Casino	Coquitlam, British Columbia, Canada	
BFL 32	August 23, 2014	River Rock Casino Resort	Richmond, British Columbia, Canada	
BFL 33	November 7, 2014	Hard Rock Casino	Coquitlam, British Columbia, Canada	
BFL 34: Undefeated	January 24, 2015	River Rock Casino Resort	Richmond, British Columbia, Canada	
BFL 35	March 28, 2015	River Rock Casino Resort	Richmond, British Columbia, Canada	
BFL 36: Blood Brothers	May 30, 2015	River Rock Casino Resort	Richmond, British Columbia, Canada	
BFL 37: Gladiator	July 25, 2015	Hard Rock Casino	Coquitlam, British Columbia, Canada	
BFL 38: Bad Blood	September 11, 2015	River Rock Casino Resort	Richmond, British Columbia, Canada	
BFL 39: Halloween Hell	October 17, 2015	Hard Rock Casino	Coquitlam, British Columbia, Canada	
BFL 40: Warpath Vendetta	November 14, 2015	Squiala Community Hall	Chilliwack, British Columbia, Canada	
BFL 41	January 22, 2016	Hard Rock Casino	Coquitlam, British Columbia, Canada	
BFL 42: Harriott vs. Anderson II	March 12, 2016	River Rock Casino Resort	Richmond, British Columbia, Canada	
BFL 43: Broken Bones	May 7, 2016	Hard Rock Casino	Coquitlam, British Columbia, Canada	
BFL 44: Vendetta	June 18, 2016	Hard Rock Casino	Coquitlam, British Columbia, Canada	
BFL 45: Ascension	September 17, 2016	Hard Rock Casino	Coquitlam, British Columbia, Canada	
BFL 46	October 29, 2016	Hard Rock Casino	Coquitlam, British Columbia, Canada	
BFL 47	February 18, 2017	Hard Rock Casino	Coquitlam, British Columbia, Canada	
BFL 48	April 29, 2017	Hard Rock Casino	Coquitlam, British Columbia, Canada	
BFL 49	June 24, 2017	Hard Rock Casino	Coquitlam, British Columbia, Canada	
BFL 50: Next Wave	July 8, 2017	Vancouver Convention Centre	Vancouver, British Columbia, Canada	
BFL 51	September 9, 2017	Hard Rock Casino	Coquitlam, British Columbia, Canada	
BFL 52	November 18, 2017	Hard Rock Casino	Vancouver, British Columbia, Canada	
BFL 53	January 13, 2018	Molson Theatre at Hard Rock Casino	Coquitlam, British Columbia, Canada	
BFL 54	March 17, 2018	Hard Rock Casino	Coquitlam, British Columbia, Canada	
BFL 55	May 26, 2018	Hard Rock Casino	Coquitlam, British Columbia, Canada	
BFL 56: Heavy Hitters	July 14, 2018	Hard Rock Casino	Coquitlam, British Columbia, Canada	
BFL 57: Incursion	September 22, 2018	Hard Rock Casino	Coquitlam, British Columbia, Canada	
BFL 58	November 17, 2018	Hard Rock Casino	Coquitlam, British Columbia, Canada	
BFL 59	January 12, 2019	Hard Rock Casino	Coquitlam, British Columbia, Canada	
BFL 60	March 16, 2019	Hard Rock Casino	Coquitlam, British Columbia, Canada	
BFL 61	June 1, 2019	Hard Rock Casino	Coquitlam, British Columbia, Canada	
BFL 62	July 6, 2019	World Champion Club	Richmond, British Columbia, Canada	
BFL 63	September 21, 2019	Hard Rock Casino	Coquitlam, British Columbia, Canada	
BFL 64	November 16, 2019	Hard Rock Casino	Coquitlam, British Columbia, Canada	
BFL 65	February 8, 2020	Hard Rock Casino	Coquitlam, British Columbia, Canada	
BFL 66	March 19, 2021	Vancouver Convention Centre	Vancouver, British Columbia, Canada	
BFL 67	June 4, 2021	BMO Theatre	Vancouver, British Columbia, Canada	
BFL 68	September 30, 2021	BMO Theatre	Vancouver, British Columbia, Canada	
BFL 69	October 1, 2021	BMO Theatre	Vancouver, British Columbia, Canada	
BFL 70	December 3, 2021	BMO Theatre	Vancouver, British Columbia, Canada	
BFL 71	March 10, 2022	Harbour Convention Centre	Vancouver, British Columbia, Canada	
BFL 72: Battle Mania	April 28, 2022	Harbour Convention Centre	Vancouver, British Columbia, Canada	
BFL 73: Warfare	July 7, 2022	Harbour Convention Centre	Vancouver, British Columbia, Canada	
BFL 74	October 12, 2022	Harbour Convention Centre	Vancouver, British Columbia, Canada	
BFL 75	December 1, 2022	Harbour Convention Centre	Vancouver, British Columbia, Canada	
BFL 76: Canada vs. USA	March 30, 2023	Harbour Convention Centre	Vancouver, British Columbia, Canada	
BFL 77	June 9, 2023	Harbour Event & Convention Centre	Vancouver, British Columbia, Canada	
BFL 78	October 19, 2023	Harbour Event & Convention Centre	Vancouver, British Columbia, Canada	
BFL 79	February 8, 2024	Harbour Event & Convention Centre	Vancouver, British Columbia, Canada	
BFL 80: World War	May 9, 2024	Harbour Event & Convention Centre	Vancouver, British Columbia, Canada	
BFL 81: World War 2	September 6, 2024	Vancouver Convention Centre	Vancouver, British Columbia, Canada	
BFL 82: Night of Champions	January 23, 2025	Harbour Event & Convention Centre	Vancouver, British Columbia, Canada	
BFL 83	April 17, 2025	Harbour Event & Convention Centre	Vancouver, British Columbia, Canada	
BFL 84	September 4, 2025	Harbour Event & Convention Centre	Vancouver, British Columbia, Canada	
BFL 85	October 16, 2025	Harbour Event & Convention Centre	Vancouver, British Columbia, Canada	

== Current champions ==
Division	Upper weight limit	Champion	Since	Title Defenses
Heavyweight	120 kg (264.6 lb)	(Brazil) Edison Lopes	/	-
Middleweight	84 kg (185.2 lb)	(Canada) Jared Revel	/	2
Super Welterweight	79 kg (174.2 lb)	(Bosnia and Herzegovina) Dejan Kajić		1
Welterweight	77 kg (169.8 lb)	(Canada) Adam Posener		1
Lightweight	71 kg (156.5 lb)	(Iran) Navid Zanganeh		0
Featherweight	66 kg (145.5 lb)	(Canada) Radley Da Silva		3
Bantamweight	61 kg (134.5 lb)	(United States) Christian Strong		0
Women's Flyweight	57 kg (125.7 lb)	Vacant	/	-
Women's Strawweight	53 kg (116.8 lb)	Vacant	/	-

== Champions ==
=== Men's professional champions ===
Division	Champion
Bantamweight (135 lb)	Christian Strong
Featherweight (145 lb)	Radley Da Silva
Lightweight (155 lb)	Navid Zanganeh
Super lightweight (165 lb)	Rodrigo Sezinando
Welterweight (170 lb)	Adam Posener
Super welterweight (175 lb)	Dejan Kajić
Middleweight (185 lb)	Jared Revel
Heavyweight (265 lb)	Vacant
