= Met-Rx =

American brand of nutritional supplements

- Product type: Sports nutrition Bodybuilding supplements
- Current owner: 1440 Foods
- Country: United States
- Introduced: 1991; 35 years ago
- Markets: United States
- Ambassadors: John Cena; Brock Bowers
- Website: metrx.com

MET-Rx is an American brand of nutritional supplements originally produced by Met-Rx, Inc., a California company started by Scott Connelly and sold several times since. The brand created a category of bodybuilding supplements called meal replacement powders or MRPs. It was also involved in the androstenedione controversy in the late 1990s.

== Company ==
Created by Scott Connelly, an anesthesiologist, the original MET-Rx product was intended to help prevent critically ill patients from losing muscle mass. Connelly's product was marketed in cooperation with Bill Phillips, and the two began marketing to the bodybuilding and athletic communities, launching sales from the low hundreds of thousands to over $100 million annually. Connelly sold all interest in the company to Rexall Sundown for $108 million in 2000. MET-Rx is owned by NBTY.

== Products ==
=== Original MET-Rx MRP ===
The original MET-Rx meal replacement product came in two canisters—one labeled MET-Rx "base" and the other MET-Rx "plus". The instructions were to take two scoops of the plus and one scoop of the base and mix them in milk or water. MET-Rx's meal replacements and protein powders contain a proprietary blend (known as "Metamyosyn") which consists of ingredients such as whey protein, calcium caseinate, egg albumen and milk protein isolate, combined with maltodextrin, vitamins, minerals and added amino acids. As the product grew more popular, it was released as one formula combining the "base" and "plus" while removing the micellar casein component. As a result, the original Metamyosyn blend is no longer used in MET-Rx products, as their ingredients do not contain micellar casein.

An NBC DateLine broadcast on October 6, 1996, entitled "Hype in a Bottle" investigated MET-Rx USA, Inc. The report revealed that MET-Rx had failed to provide published peer-reviewed documentation to substantiate its advertising claims. In October 1993, the "MET-Rx Substantiation Report" was provided to David Lightsey of the National Council Against Health Fraud. The report claimed association with Cooper Clinic in Dallas, Texas. The report noted that several Dallas Cowboys players had gained an average of 2.5 to 3 pounds of lean body mass weekly for six weeks when using a MET-Rx product—an obvious red flag. Cooper Clinic was contacted of possible misrepresentation. The clinic issued a cease and desist letter to Met-Rx from the Cooper Clinic president and medical director.

In February 1995, the Penn State Sports Medicine Newsletter (3;6) published a report titled "Is It Real or Is It Met-Rx?" that concluded, "MET-Rx ... claims of fat loss and increased muscle mass have not been proven by scientifically accepted methods".

The National Council Against Health Fraud discussed Met-Rx in several issues of their newsletter, pointing out that the scientific claims of the manufacturer were not based on scientific studies but on the endorsement on celebrities.

== Marketing ==
MET-Rx features a wide variety of television sponsorships, such as the MET-Rx World's Strongest Man competition. As of 2004, the company claimed the brand was endorsed by 50 top athletes. MET-Rx also sponsors dozens of athletes, bodybuilders, and celebrities.

In early interviews and promotional materials, Connelly marketed himself as a 1973 Harvard Medical School graduate, and claimed he was on the faculty of Stanford Medical School between 1979 and 1986. In reality, Connelly was only at Harvard as a post-grad "special student" in the 1973–74 academic year. He then got his Doctor of Medicine in anesthesia from Boston University School of Medicine in 1978 and did a one-year Stanford fellowship in 1981. Connelly was an unpaid clinical instructor and was never part of the full-time faculty at Stanford.

== See also ==
- List of NBTY brands
