= Bill Phillips (rugby union) =

- Born: William John Phillips; 30 January 1914 Raglan, New Zealand
- Died: 10 November 1982 (aged 68) Raglan, New Zealand
- Height: 1.83 m (6 ft 0 in)
- Weight: 86 kg (190 lb)
- Occupation: Farmer

Rugby union career
- Position: Wing three-quarter
Provincial / State sides
| Years | Team | Apps | (Points) |
| 1934–38 | King Country | | |
| 1939, 41, 43, 46 | Waikato | 11 | |
International career
| Years | Team | Apps | (Points) |
| 1934–39 | New Zealand Māori | | |
| 1937–38 | New Zealand | 3 | (3) |

William John Phillips (30 January 1914 – 10 November 1982) was a New Zealand rugby union player. He was educated at Te Mata Primary School. A wing three-quarter, Phillips represented King Country and Waikato at a provincial level, and was a member of the New Zealand national side, the All Blacks, in 1937 and 1938. He played seven matches for the All Blacks including three internationals, scoring two tries in all.
