= Billy Phillips (boxer) =

Welsh boxer

Personal information
- Nationality: British (Welsh)
- Born: Q2.1936 Ebbw Vale, Wales
- Died: 2021 Ebbw Vale, Wales

Sport
- Sport: Boxing
- Event(s): Light-welterweight; Welterweight
- Club: Ebbw Vale

William Gwyn Phillips (1936–2021) was a boxer who competed for Wales at the Commonwealth Games.

== Biography ==
Phillips boxed out of the Ebbw Vale Boxing Club and was the 1957 Welsh ABA champion at light-heavyweight.

Phillips stepped up in weight to welterweight and was runner-up to Brian Curvis in the 1957 Welsh welterweight championship.

A crane driver by trade, he was selected for the 1958 Welsh team for the 1958 British Empire and Commonwealth Games in Cardiff, Wales. He competed in the welterweight category, where he was beaten by eventual gold medallist Joseph Greyling of South Africa.

After the Games he continued represent Wales at international level.
