= Bill Phillips (author) =

American businessman

- Born: William Nathaniel Phillips; September 23, 1964 (age 61)
- Education: University of Colorado at Denver
- Occupations: Writer, entrepreneur, publisher, speaker, advisor
- Spouse: Maria Catherine Phillips
- Writing career
- Period: 1985–present
- Genres: Fitness, Bodybuilding, health
- Notable works: Anabolic Reference Guide, Natural Supplement Review, Body-for-LIFE: 12 Weeks to Mental and Physical Strength, Eating for Life: Your Guide to Great Health, Fat Loss and Increased Energy! and Transformation
- Notable awards: Ernst & Young Entrepreneur of the Year Award, Ten Outstanding Young Americans, Make-A-Wish Philanthropy Award, Fitness Hall of Fame
- Website: transformation.com

William Nathaniel Phillips (born September 23, 1964) is an American entrepreneur and author. He wrote Body for Life: 12 Weeks to Mental and Physical Strength with Mike D'Orso. He is also the author of Eating for Life and the founder and former editor in chief of Muscle Media magazine and the former CEO of EAS, a performance nutritional supplement company. Other books that Phillips has authored are Anabolic Reference Guide, The Natural Supplement Review, and Transformation: The Mindset You Need. The Body You Want. The Life You Deserve. Phillips made a promotional movie called Body of Work which was filmed in Las Vegas, Nevada and chronicled the first EAS Challenge.

== Personal life ==
Born in September 1964, Phillips was raised in Golden, Colorado, where he lived with his father Bill (often referred to as BP), mother Suzanne, sister Shelly and brother Shawn. His father, William Phillips Sr., worked for the Coors Brewing Company while taking law classes at night. He reached the level of corporate analyst at Coors, then quit to open his own law practice. BP later worked for Phillips at EAS, along with other family members.

Phillips started bodybuilding in 1982, then moved to Southern California to train at Gold's Gym Venice Beach (known as the Mecca of bodybuilding) in 1983, remaining until 1986, a period during which Phillips admits to steroid use, at different times cycling on Deca Durabolin, Andriol, Sustanon, and other drugs that helped him grow from 185 lbs. to 215 lbs. After not succeeding as a bodybuilder, the 21-year-old Phillips moved back to Colorado where he took classes at the University of Colorado at Denver, specifically the study of exercise physiology and sports nutrition. He then began his publishing career.

On June 25, 2021, Phillips was admitted to St. Anthony Hospital in Lakewood and attached to a ventilator after a COVID-19 infection, where he spent 47 days intubated recovering from being in a medically induced coma. He lost 70 pounds. When Phillips was admitted to the hospital he already had pneumonia. ″I did not get vaccinated because I made a mistake,″ Phillips said after recuperating in August 2021. ″I thought since I had COVID in January 2020, I was immune to it."

== Career ==
In 1985 Mile High Publishing began with a small newsletter teaching bodybuilders how to use anabolic steroids. The newsletter was written and printed in his mother's garage. Funded with $180 he had made from mowing lawns, its original name was The Anabolic Reference Update. In 1991, Phillips began working with doctors and research scientists to develop performance nutrition products that could help athletes get better muscle-building and fat-burning effects from their workouts.

=== Muscle Media 2000 ("MM2K") ===
In 1992, Phillips moved out of his mother's home and changed the publication's format and name to Muscle Media 2000 (usually referred to as "MM2K"). The magazine published frank discussion of the underground aspects of bodybuilding such as the use of and how to smuggle steroids, and columns by writers such as The Steroid Guru Dan Duchaine, Editor-in-Chief TC Luoma, Charles Poliquin, Mike Mooney, Nutritionist Keith Klein CN CCN, and Michael Dullnig M.D. aka "Dr. X."

Muscle Media 2000 debuted in March 1992 and featured bodybuilder Lee Labrada on the cover.

=== MET-Rx ===
In MM2K Phillips highly endorsed MET-Rx (a meal replacement supplement), and this relationship with readers helped it become the highest selling bodybuilding supplement ever at that time. It was later revealed however, that Phillips and the creator of MET-Rx, Dr. A. Scott Connelly, were in fact business partners, and the endorsements clever marketing. This partnership also included bodybuilders Lee Labrada and Jeff Everson. It was around this time that Phillips began working with James Bradshaw (later of SoCal Supplements). Bradshaw was convicted of dispensing human and animal steroids without prescriptions in 1986. This eventually would lead to Bradshaw serving four years in a Louisiana prison, where he educated himself on marketing. According to former Muscle Media 2000 editor-in-chief TC Luoma, it was Bradshaw who convinced Phillips to market MET-Rx heavily in the Natural Supplement Review, Phillips' supposedly unbiased review of numerous bodybuilding supplements. He also had the idea for Phillips to give the Review away for free to readers of Muscle Media 2000, thus obtaining the addresses of potential MET-Rx buyers and toward which a large amount of advertising may be targeted. Sales of MET-Rx rose exponentially. Bradshaw and Phillips had stumbled upon a very successful method of marketing to bodybuilders, and they, and original investors Everson and Connelly, got very wealthy. Their partnership was short-lived however.

Phillips and Connelly had an agreement that distribution of MET-Rx would be controlled, and that they would not sell it to retail outlets in order to keep supply low during the period of high demand created by the advertisements in Muscle Media 2000. Connelly however, had other ideas and began selling it to mainstream distributors and department stores. Phillips believed this move lessened its appeal to bodybuilders, and destroyed the "mystique" of the product. The two parted ways, and as part of the settlement, Phillips was legally bound not to mention the name of MET-Rx in his magazines (thereafter he would refer to it as "the leading brand"). But by then Phillips had his eye on another venture that would eclipse MET-Rx altogether – EAS.

=== EAS ===
Phillips acquired Experimental and Applied Sciences (EAS) from founders Anthony Almada and Ed Byrd in 1996. He promoted the company's products through heavy editorial-style advertisements in MM2K and, led by flagship products like Myoplex (a meal replacement powder), the creatine supplement Phosphagen, and HMB, he eventually rose to the forefront of the nutritional supplement industry, where he remained for more than five years.

By 1995 Phillips was a multi-millionaire, and was well known in celebrity and sports circles. Athletes like José Canseco would contact Phillips for advice on steroids, and he also consulted with celebrities such as Jerry Seinfeld, John Elway, Sylvester Stallone and Demi Moore.

In 1999, Phillips sold his majority interest in EAS (though he remained on the Board of Directors for a number of years afterward) to North Castle Partners for $160 million. Phillips retained about a third of the company, which he sold in 2004 and is no longer involved with EAS.

=== Muscle Media ===
In 1997, Phillips was eager to expand his empire beyond the bodybuilding industry. MM2K changed from targeting the hardcore bodybuilder to the more mainstream exercise participant, and the July 1997 issue saw the magazine redubbed simply as Muscle Media. While Muscle Media 2000 had a distribution of 500,000 copies per issue at its peak, the change in direction alienated many traditional readers, and sales numbers reportedly declined sharply afterwards. Publication finally ceased in 2004 after the EAS company was sold a second time.

=== High Point Media ===
After Phillips sold his majority interest in EAS, he concentrated on his writing and on promotion of his books through his publishing company, High Point Media, as well as Value Creation, a branch of EAS.

Body for Life hit bookstores in 1999, and by 2003 it had sold 3.5 million copies in 24 languages. The book topped the charts in 11 different countries-including the United States, England, Japan, Australia, Greece and Finland. In 2004 USA Today named it among the Top 15 bestselling books of the past decade.

In November 2003, Eating for Life: Your Guide to Great Health, Fat Loss and Increased Energy! was released. In the book Phillips offers his plan "to help inspire and guide even more people to improve their health and lift their quality of life to new heights."

In February 2006, Phillips announced his "Great American Transformation Experience" (GATE) with a goal to transform America's fitness from world's worst to first within 10 years.

On June 21, 2010, Phillips' latest book, Transformation: The Mindset You Need. The Body You Want. The Life You Deserve was released. A companion website, Transformation.com, that walks individuals through the transformation process was also updated. The site features a community dedicated to supporting its members' personal goals. On July 10, 2010, the book made the New York Times Best Seller list.

== Awards ==
Phillips has been honored by Paul Newman and by John F. Kennedy Jr. as one of America's most generous business leaders when EAS was honored in 1999 with a Newman's Own/George Award.

The United States Junior Chamber of Commerce honored Phillips in January 2000 as one of the Ten Outstanding Young Americans.

Phillips was also chosen to help carry the Olympic torch on its relay across the United States for the 2002 Winter Olympics in Salt Lake City.

Bill Phillips has donated over $5 million to the Make-A-Wish Foundation. Over the past 20 years Bill Phillips has granted over 600 wishes to kids facing life-threatening medical conditions through the Make-A-Wish Foundation. All the proceeds that would have gone to Phillips from the sale of his book Body-for-LIFE were donated to the Make-A-Wish Foundation.

Phillips was awarded with The Ernst & Young Entrepreneur of the Year Award in 1997.

On June 24, 2014, Bill Phillips was inducted into the Fitness Hall of Fame along with Jack LaLanne, Arnold Schwarzenegger, and Jillian Michaels.

== Books ==
- Anabolic Reference Guide. Mile High Publishing, 1991.
- Sports Supplement Review. Mile High Publishing, 1997.
- Body-for-LIFE: 12 Weeks to Mental and Physical Strength. HarperCollins, 1999. ISBN 0-06-019339-5
- Body for Life Success Journal. HarperCollins, 2002. ISBN 0-06-051559-7
- Eating for Life: Your Guide to Great Health, Fat Loss and Increased Energy! High Point Media, 2003. ISBN 0-9720184-1-7
- Transformation: A Path from Physical to Spiritual Well-Being. Hay House, 2010. ISBN 978-1-4019-1176-8
