= National Register of Historic Places listings in Howard County, Missouri =

Location of Howard County in Missouri

This is a list of the National Register of Historic Places listings in Howard County, Missouri.

This is intended to be a complete list of the properties and districts on the National Register of Historic Places in Howard County, Missouri, United States. Latitude and longitude coordinates are provided for many National Register properties and districts; these locations may be seen together in a map.

There are 25 properties and districts listed on the National Register in the county.

This National Park Service list is complete through NPS recent listings posted May 1, 2026.

== Current listings ==
	Name on the Register	Image	Date listed	Location	City or town	Description
1	Edwin and Nora Payne Bedford House	Edwin and Nora Payne Bedford House	January 23, 1998 (#97001666)	308 S. Main St. 39°08′39″N 92°40′51″W	Fayette	
2	Boonslick State Park	Boonslick State Park	December 30, 1969 (#69000104)	1 mile (1.6 km) north of Boonesboro on MO 87, 2 miles (3.2 km) southwest on MO 187; 39°05′01″N 92°52′44″W	Boonesboro	
3	Campbell Chapel African Methodist Episcopal Church	Campbell Chapel African Methodist Episcopal Church	November 13, 1997 (#97001427)	602 Commerce St. 39°13′36″N 92°50′29″W	Glasgow	
4	Cedar Grove	Cedar Grove	July 19, 1982 (#82003140)	West of Franklin; 39°00′35″N 92°47′57″W	Franklin	
5	Central Methodist College Campus Historic District	Central Methodist College Campus Historic District	September 15, 1980 (#80002357)	Roughly bounded by Mulberry, Elm, Church and MO 5; 39°09′01″N 92°41′07″W	Fayette	
6	Coleman Hall	Coleman Hall	June 11, 1986 (#86001326)	502 N. Linn; 39°08′55″N 92°41′10″W	Fayette	
7	Fayette City Park Swimming Pool	Fayette City Park Swimming Pool	April 15, 1999 (#99000457)	Memorial Park; 39°09′07″N 92°41′42″W	Fayette	
8	Fayette Courthouse Square Historic District	Fayette Courthouse Square Historic District	February 5, 1998 (#98000069)	Roughly along S. Main and N. Main, W. Morrison, E. Morrison, N. Church, and W. Davis Sts. 39°08′45″N 92°40′57″W	Fayette	
9	Fayette Residential Historic District		September 3, 2009 (#09000681)	Roughly bounded by Church Street, West Morrison Street and Cleveland Avenue; 39°08′35″N 92°41′08″W	Fayette	
10	Finks-Harvey Plantation		December 11, 1978 (#78001649)	West of Roanoke; 39°19′20″N 92°45′11″W	Roanoke	
11	Glasgow Commercial Historic District	Glasgow Commercial Historic District	January 16, 1992 (#91001915)	501-623 First St., 100-195 Market St., 603 Second St. 39°13′35″N 92°50′48″W	Glasgow	
12	Glasgow Presbyterian Church	Glasgow Presbyterian Church	September 9, 1982 (#82003141)	Commerce and 4th Sts. 39°13′36″N 92°50′36″W	Glasgow	
13	Glasgow Public Library	Glasgow Public Library	May 21, 1969 (#69000106)	NW corner Market and 4th Sts. 39°13′34″N 92°50′36″W	Glasgow	
14	Greenwood	Greenwood	March 29, 1983 (#83000994)	MO 5; 39°03′49″N 92°45′04″W	Fayette	
15	Harris-Chilton-Ruble House	Harris-Chilton-Ruble House	September 4, 1980 (#80002359)	108 N. Missouri Ave. 39°01′12″N 92°44′28″W	New Franklin	
16	Thomas Hickman House		July 19, 2006 (#06000627)	10 Research Center Rd. 39°01′22″N 92°45′37″W	New Franklin	
17	Inglewood	Inglewood	June 21, 1990 (#90000981)	701 Randolph St. 39°13′48″N 92°50′18″W	Glasgow	
18	Prior Jackson Homeplace		March 10, 1980 (#80002358)	South of Fayette on MO DD; 39°08′03″N 92°41′20″W	Fayette	
19	Alfred W. Morrison House		April 16, 1969 (#69000105)	1 mile (1.6 km) southwest of Fayette on MO 5; 39°08′03″N 92°41′36″W	Fayette	
20	New Franklin Commercial Historic District	New Franklin Commercial Historic District	January 23, 2013 (#12001207)	106-136 & 101-113 E. Broadway; 39°01′02″N 92°44′12″W	New Franklin	
21	Oakwood	Oakwood	September 23, 1982 (#82003138)	1 Leonard Ave. 39°08′51″N 92°40′34″W	Fayette	
22	Rivercene		February 16, 1973 (#73001039)	R.F.D. 1; 38°59′08″N 92°44′30″W	New Franklin	
23	St. Mary's Episcopal Church	St. Mary's Episcopal Church	September 9, 1982 (#82003139)	104 W. Davis St. 39°08′46″N 92°41′06″W	Fayette	
24	South Main Street Historic District	South Main Street Historic District	February 5, 1999 (#99000083)	200, 202, 204, and 208-312 South Main St. 39°08′37″N 92°40′50″W	Fayette	
25	Dr. Uriel S. Wright Office	Dr. Uriel S. Wright Office	December 22, 1987 (#87001727)	120 Church St. 39°08′49″N 92°41′01″W	Fayette	

== See also ==
- List of National Historic Landmarks in Missouri
- National Register of Historic Places listings in Missouri
