= List of Art Deco architecture in Missouri =

This is a list of buildings that are examples of the Art Deco architectural style in Missouri, United States.

== Cape Girardeau ==
- 2 North Fountain, Courthouse–Seminary Neighborhood Historic District, Cape Girardeau, 1940
- Broadway Theater, Broadway Commercial Historic District, Cape Girardeau, 1921
- Esquire Theater, Cape Girardeau, 1947

== Columbia ==
- Columbia National Guard Armory, Columbia, 1940
- Doctor's Building, Columbia, 1940s
- Metropolitan Building, Eighth and Broadway Historic District, Columbia, 1930
- National Guard Armory, Columbia, 1940

== Hannibal ==
- Crescent Jewelers, Hannibal, 1920s
- Fifth Street Baptist Church Welcome Center, Hannibal
- Kresge Building, Broadway District, Hannibal, 1931

== Jefferson City ==
- 209 Adams (former A&P Grocery Store), Capitol Avenue Historic District, Jefferson City, 1939
- Prince Edward Apartments, 208 Marshall, Capitol Avenue Historic District, Jefferson City, 1930
- Tergin Apartment Building, Jefferson City, 1939

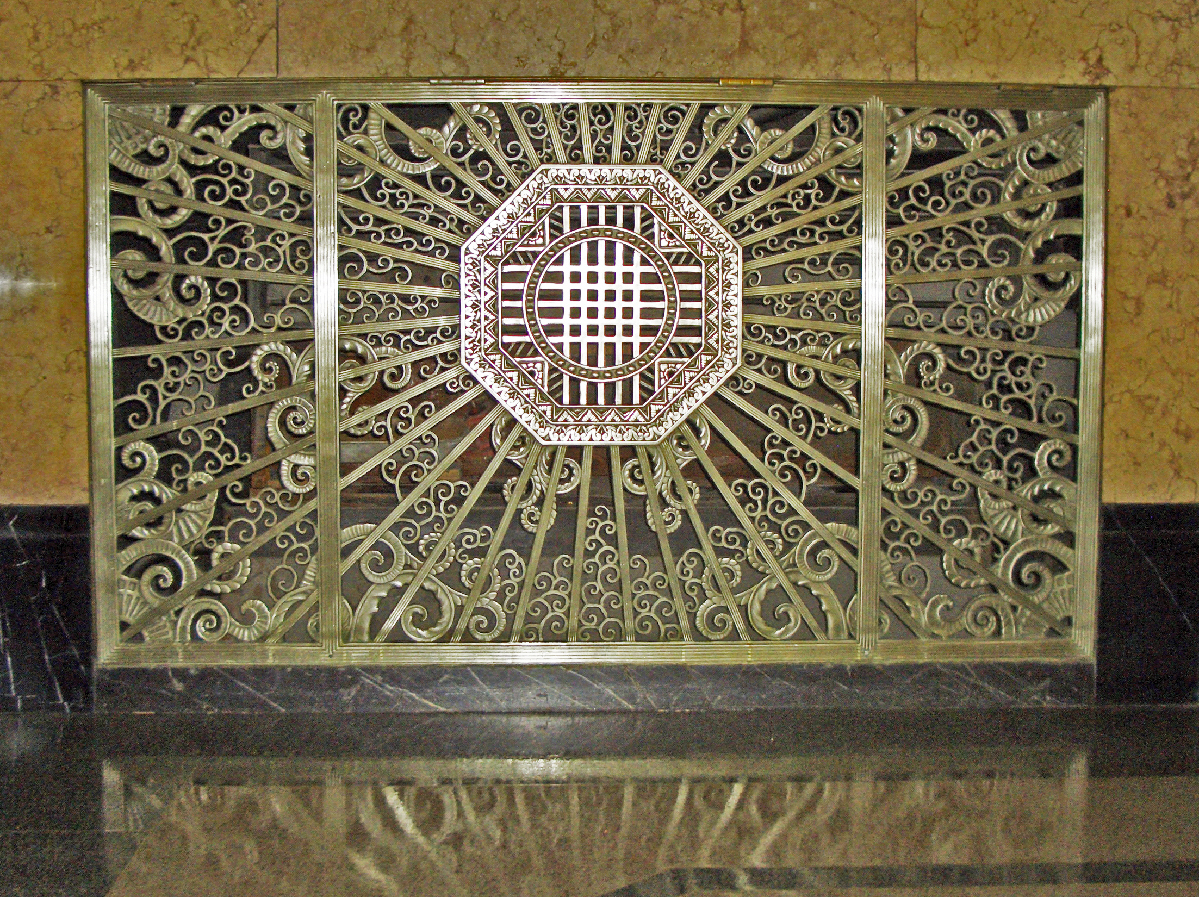
Kansas City Power and Light Building, Kansas City

== Kansas City ==
- 909 Walnut, Kansas City, 1931
- 925 Grand, Kansas City, 1921
- Bartle Hall Pylons, Kansas City, 1994
- F. W. Woolworth Building, Kansas City, 1928
- Hotel Phillips, Kansas City
- Jackson County Courthouse, Kansas City, 1934
- Kansas City City Hall, Kansas City, 1937
- Kansas City Convention Center, Kansas City, 1994
- Kansas City Power and Light Building, Kansas City, 1931
- Katz Drug Building, Kansas City, 1938
- Municipal Auditorium, Kansas City, 1936
- National World War I Museum and Memorial, Kansas City, 1926
- St. Stephen Baptist Church, Kansas City, 1947
- Switzer School, Kansas City, 1939
- Tower Dry Cleaners and Laundry, Kansas City, 1944
- United States Courthouse and Post Office, Kansas City, 1939

== St. Joseph ==
- 901 Jules, St. Joseph, 1950
- Benton High School, St. Joseph, 1940
- Missouri Theater and Missouri Theater Building, St. Joseph, 1927
- Regal Cinema (now furniture store), St. Joseph, 1926
- Trail Theater, St. Joseph, 1951
- United States Post Office and Courthouse, St. Joseph, 1938

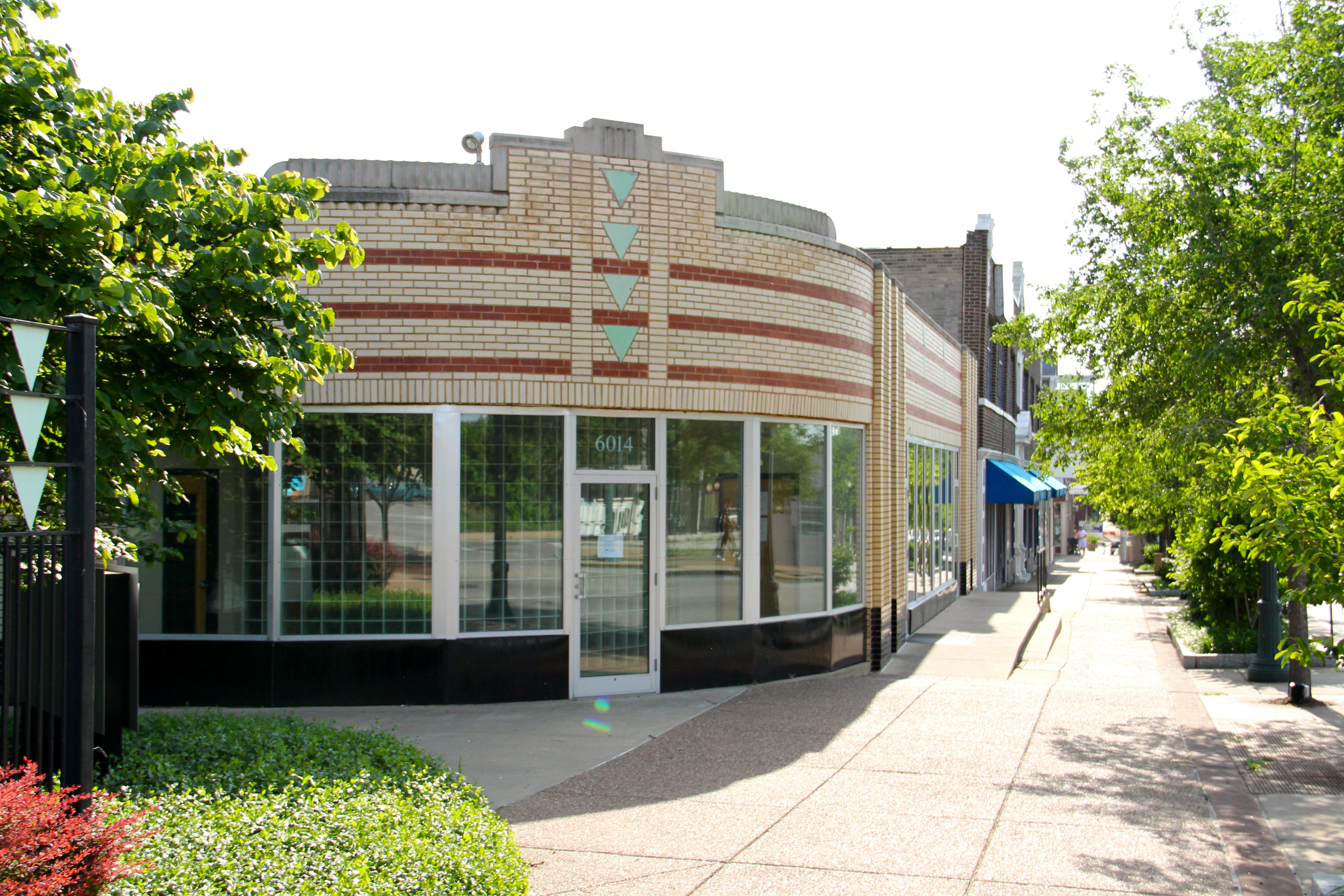
A & P Food Stores Building, St. Louis

== St. Louis ==
- A & P Food Stores Building, St. Louis, 1940
- ABC Auto Sales and Investment Company Building, St. Louis, 1927
- Continental Life Building, St. Louis, 1930
- DeBaliviere Building, St. Louis, 1928
- Fox Theatre, St. Louis, 1929
- Jewel Box, St. Louis, 1936
- Shell Building, St. Louis
- Southwestern Bell Building, St. Louis, 1926
- Tom-Boy Supermarket (now LeGrand's Market), St. Louis, 1936
- Vestal Chemical Company, St. Louis, 1920s
- Victor Creamery Company (now Vandeventer Building), St. Louis, 1935

== Sedalia ==
- 218 Ohio, Sedalia Commercial Historic District, Sedalia
- Boonslick Regional Library, Sedalia
- Fox Theater Event Center, Sedalia, 1940
- Missouri State Fair, Sedalia, 1941
- Sedalia National Bank, 301 S. Ohio, Sedalia Commercial Historic District, Sedalia, 1929
- Uptown Theatre, 225 Ohio Street, Sedalia, 1936

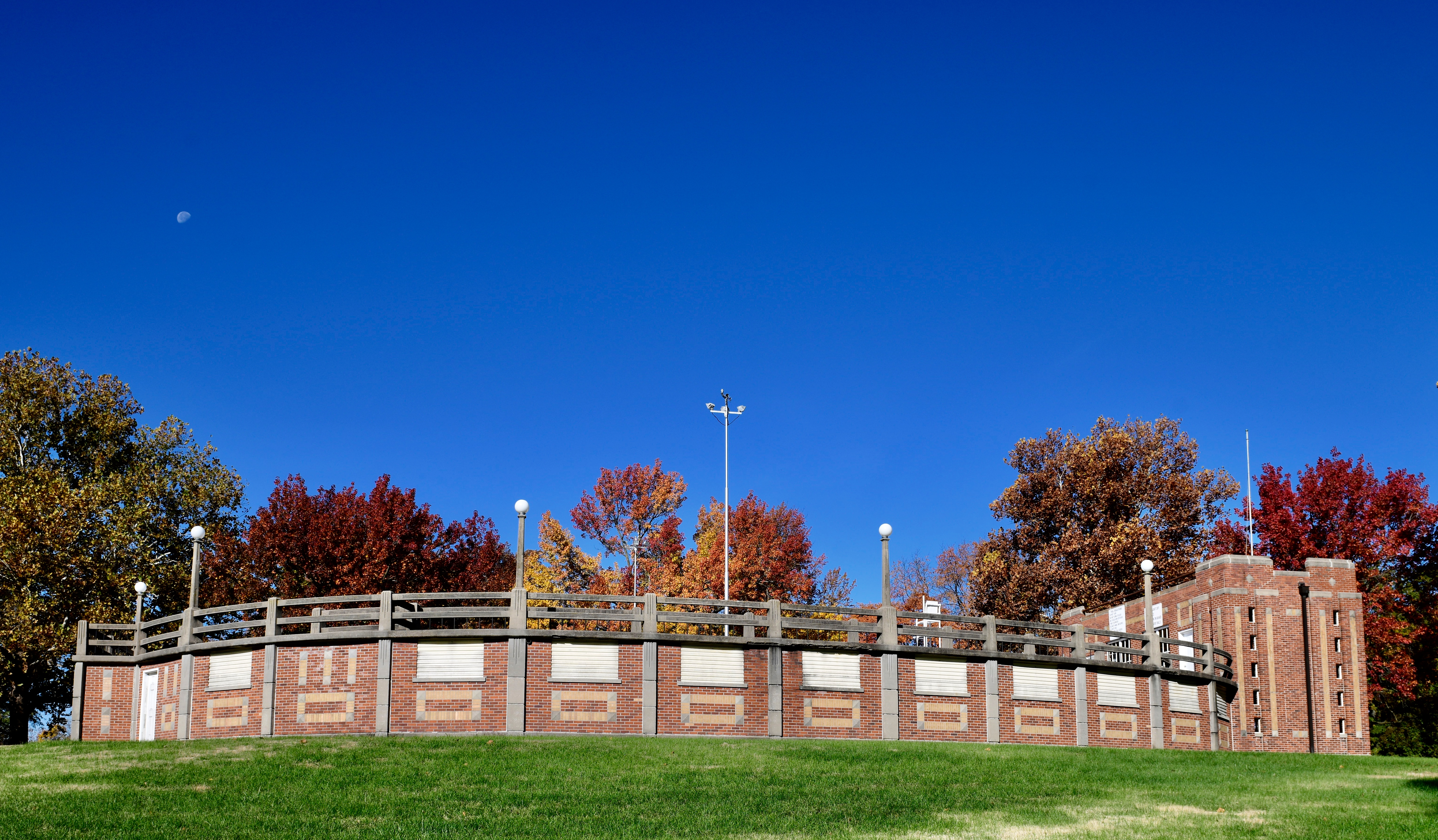
Fayette City Park Swimming Pool, Fayette

== Other cities ==
- 66 Drive-In, Carthage, 1949
- 113 East Main, Fredericktown Courthouse Square Historic District, Fredericktown, 1931
- 135 West Main, Fredericktown Courthouse Square Historic District, Fredericktown, 1926
- 417 Logan, (former Arnold and Mills Lumber Yard), Chillicothe Commercial Historic District, Chillicothe
- Avenue Theater, Courthouse Square Historic District, West Plains, 1950
- Big Pump, Maryville, 1937
- Boots Motel, Carthage, 1939
- Clay County Courthouse, Liberty, 1936
- Daily Express Building, Kirksville, 1936
- DeKalb County Courthouse, Maysville, 1939
- Dexter Gymnasium, Dexter, 1940
- Esquire Theater, Richmond Heights, 1939
- Fayette City Park Swimming Pool, Fayette, 1940
- Glen Theatre, 1415 South Main Street, Joplin, 1937
- Hall of Waters, Excelsior Springs, 1934
- Howell County Courthouse, Courthouse Square Historic District, West Plains, 1937
- Huffman Auto Sales, Macon
- La Plata station, La Plata, 1945
- Miller-Star Opera House (now Lewis Street Playhouse), Canton, 1893
- Moberly Junior High School, Moberly, 1930
- Municipal Auditorium, Moberly, 1939
- Plaza Hotel, Trenton, 1930
- Renick School, Renick, 1943
- Ritz Theatre (now Finke Theatre), California, 1937
- Rodgers Theatre Building, Poplar Bluff, 1949
- Route Sixty Six Theater (former Newland Hotel), Downtown Webb City Historic District, Webb City, 1891 and 1925
- State Theater, Mound City, 1938
- Uptown Theatre, Carrollton, 1936
- Walt Theatre, New Haven Commercial Historic District, New Haven, 1940

== See also ==
- List of Art Deco architecture
- List of Art Deco architecture in the United States
