= Greggs Creek =

Stream in the U.S. state of Missouri

Greggs Creek is a stream in western Howard County in the U.S. state of Missouri. It is a tributary to the Missouri River.

The stream headwaters arise at 39°13′29″N 92°44′29″W at an elevation of approximately 840 feet adjacent to the west side of Missouri Route 5. The stream flows generally west roughly paralleling Route 5 to its confluence with the Missouri on the south side of the community of Glasgow at 39°13′14″N 92°50′54″W and at an elevation of 620 feet.

Greggs Creek was named for the original owner of the land along its course.

== See also ==
- List of rivers of Missouri
