= Oakwood (Fayette, Missouri) =

Historic house in Missouri, United States

- U.S. National Register of Historic Places
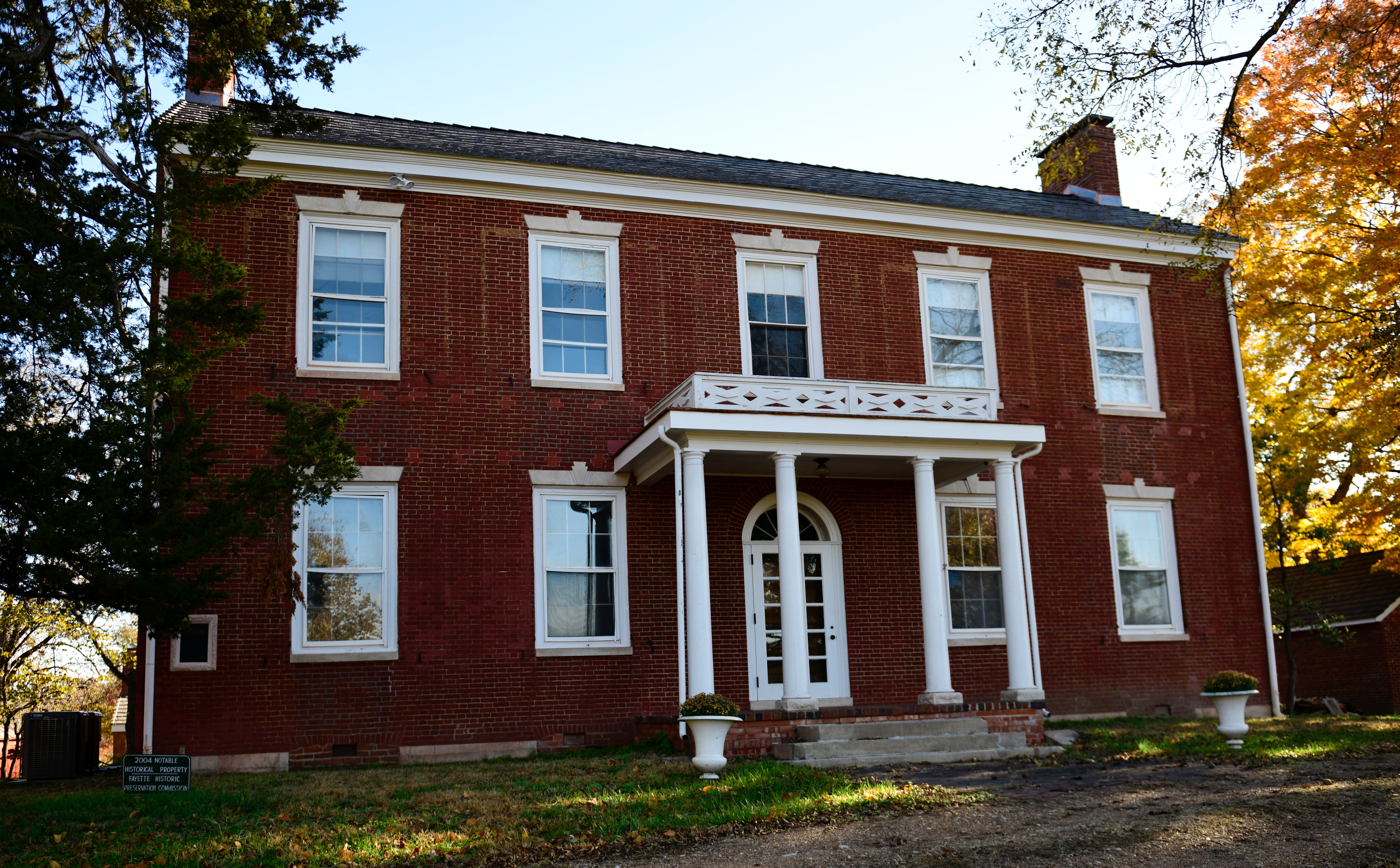

- Location within Missouri Location within the United States
- Location: 1 Leonard Ave. Fayette, Missouri
- Coordinates: 39°8′51″N 92°40′34″W
- Area: 29.8 acres (12.1 ha)
- Built: 1834-1836
- Built by: Multiple
- Architectural style: Federal
- NRHP reference No.: 82003138
- Added to NRHP: September 23, 1982

Oakwood, also known as the Abiel Leonard House, is a historic home located at Fayette, Howard County, Missouri. It was built about 1834–1836, with alterations occurring in 1850–1851, 1856–1858, the 1890s, and 1938. It is a two-story, Federal style brick I-house with a two-story rear ell with a double gallery porch. The front facade features a small classical portico. Also on the property are the contributing brick slave house, a second brick slave house (1857) adjoining an existing brick smokehouse, an ice house, and a fruit cellar.

It was listed on the National Register of Historic Places in 1982.
