= Columbia National Guard Armory =

- U.S. National Register of Historic Places
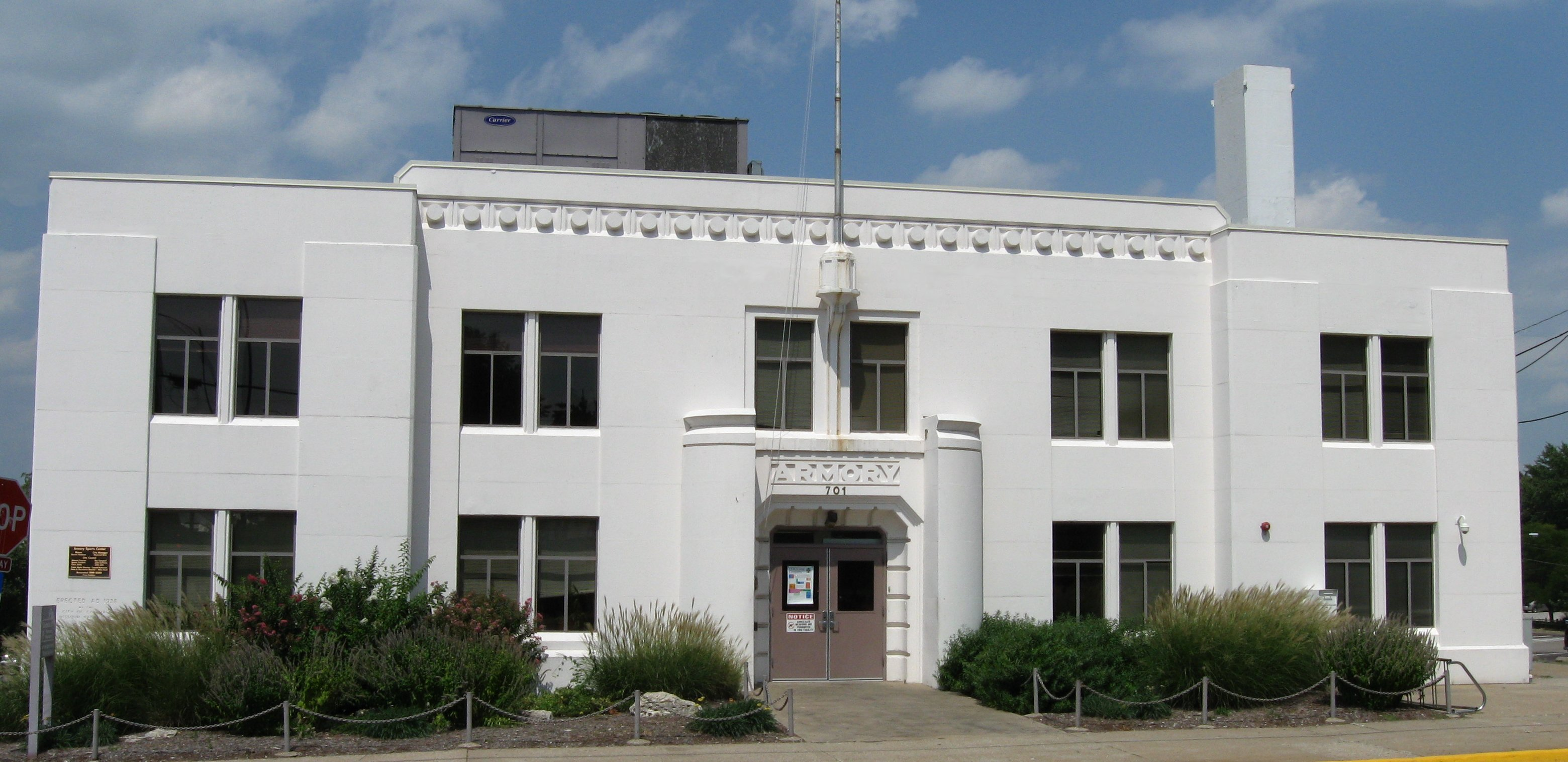

- Location within Missouri Location within the United States
- Location: 701 E. Ash St., Columbia, Missouri
- Coordinates: 38°57′14″N 92°19′45″W
- Area: less than one acre
- Built: 1940
- Architect: Deering, Robert B.; Clark, Dave (WPA)
- Architectural style: Art Deco
- NRHP reference No.: 93000197
- Added to NRHP: March 25, 1993

The National Guard Armory is a historic National Guard Armory located at Columbia, Missouri. It was built about 1940, as a Works Progress Administration project. The rectangular, reinforced concrete, Art Deco building sits on the north side of downtown Columbia. Today the building is owned by the city and used as a youth recreation center.

It was listed on the National Register of Historic Places in 1993.
