= Glasgow Commercial Historic District =

Historic district in Missouri, United States

- U.S. National Register of Historic Places
- U.S. Historic district
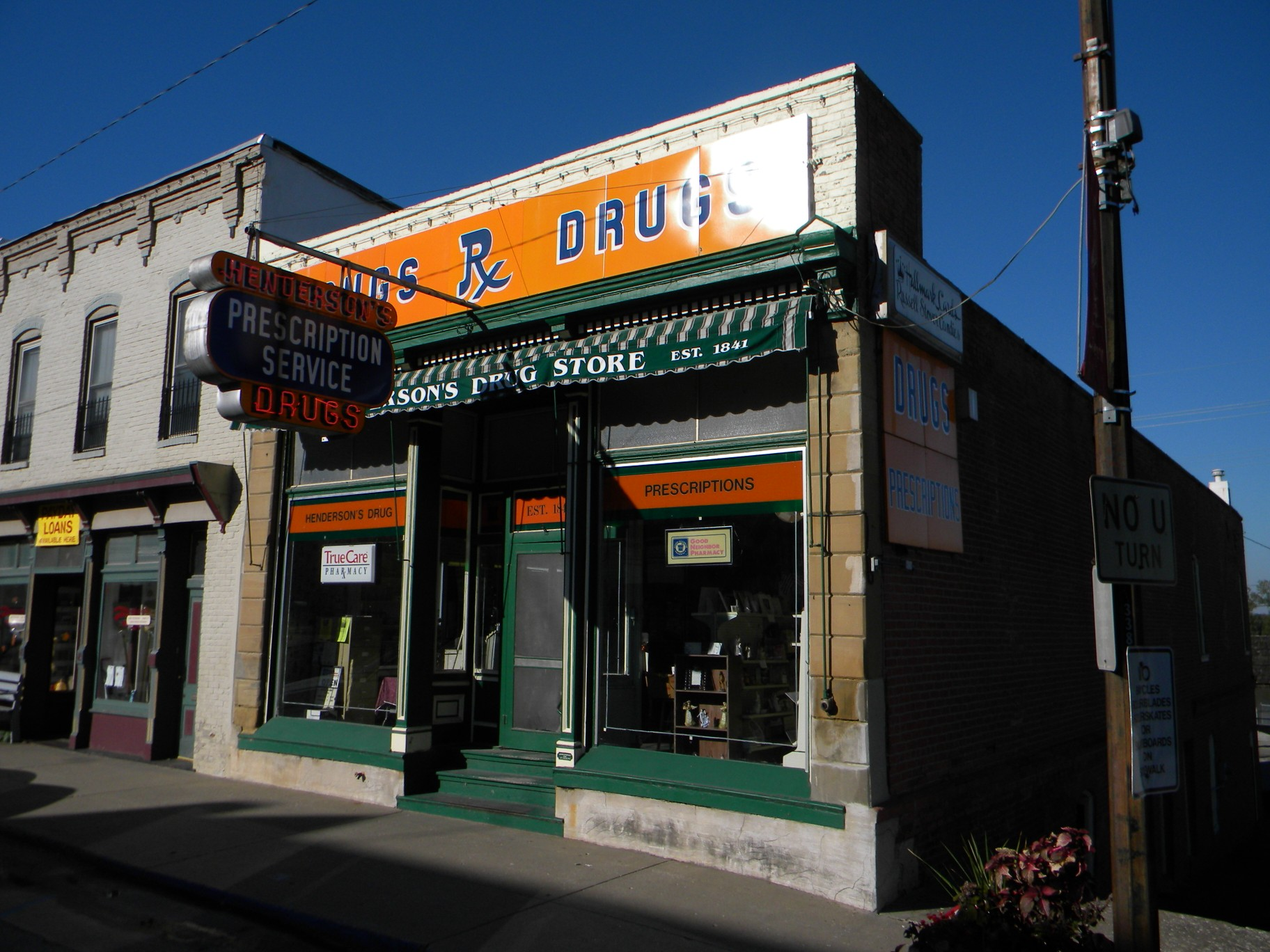
- Glasgow Commercial Historic District, October 2010

- Location within Missouri Location within the United States
- Location: 501-623 First St., 100-195 Market St., 603 Second St., Glasgow, Missouri
- Coordinates: 39°13′35″N 92°50′48″W
- Area: 4.4 acres (1.8 ha)
- Architectural style: Second Empire, Italianate, Queen Anne
- NRHP reference No.: 91001915
- Added to NRHP: January 16, 1992

Glasgow Commercial Historic District is a national historic district located at Glasgow, Howard County, Missouri. The district encompasses 31 contributing buildings in the central business district of Glasgow. It developed between about 1867 and 1940 and includes representative examples of Second Empire, Italianate, and Queen Anne style architecture. Notable buildings include the Old City Hall (1867-1868), W. A. Meyer Grocery (1879), Henderson's Drug Store (1875), and Bank building/City Hall (1883).

It was listed on the National Register of Historic Places in 1992.
