= Prior Jackson Homeplace =

Historic house in Missouri, United States

- U.S. National Register of Historic Places
- Location within Missouri Location within the United States
- Location: South of Fayette on MO DD, Fayette, Missouri
- Coordinates: 39°8′3″N 92°41′20″W
- Area: less than one acre
- Built: c. 1856
- Built by: Megraw, Joseph
- Architectural style: Classical Revival
- NRHP reference No.: 80002358
- Added to NRHP: March 10, 1980

Prior Jackson Homeplace, also known as Cedar Lawn and Fern Valley, is a historic home located near Fayette, Howard County, Missouri. It was built about 1856, and is a two-story, three-bay, Classical Revival style red brick dwelling with a two-story rear wing with an enclosed gallery porch. It measures 51 feet by 44 feet and has a pitched hipped roof.

It was listed on the National Register of Historic Places in 1980.
