= New Franklin Commercial Historic District =

Historic district in Missouri, United States

- U.S. National Register of Historic Places
- U.S. Historic district
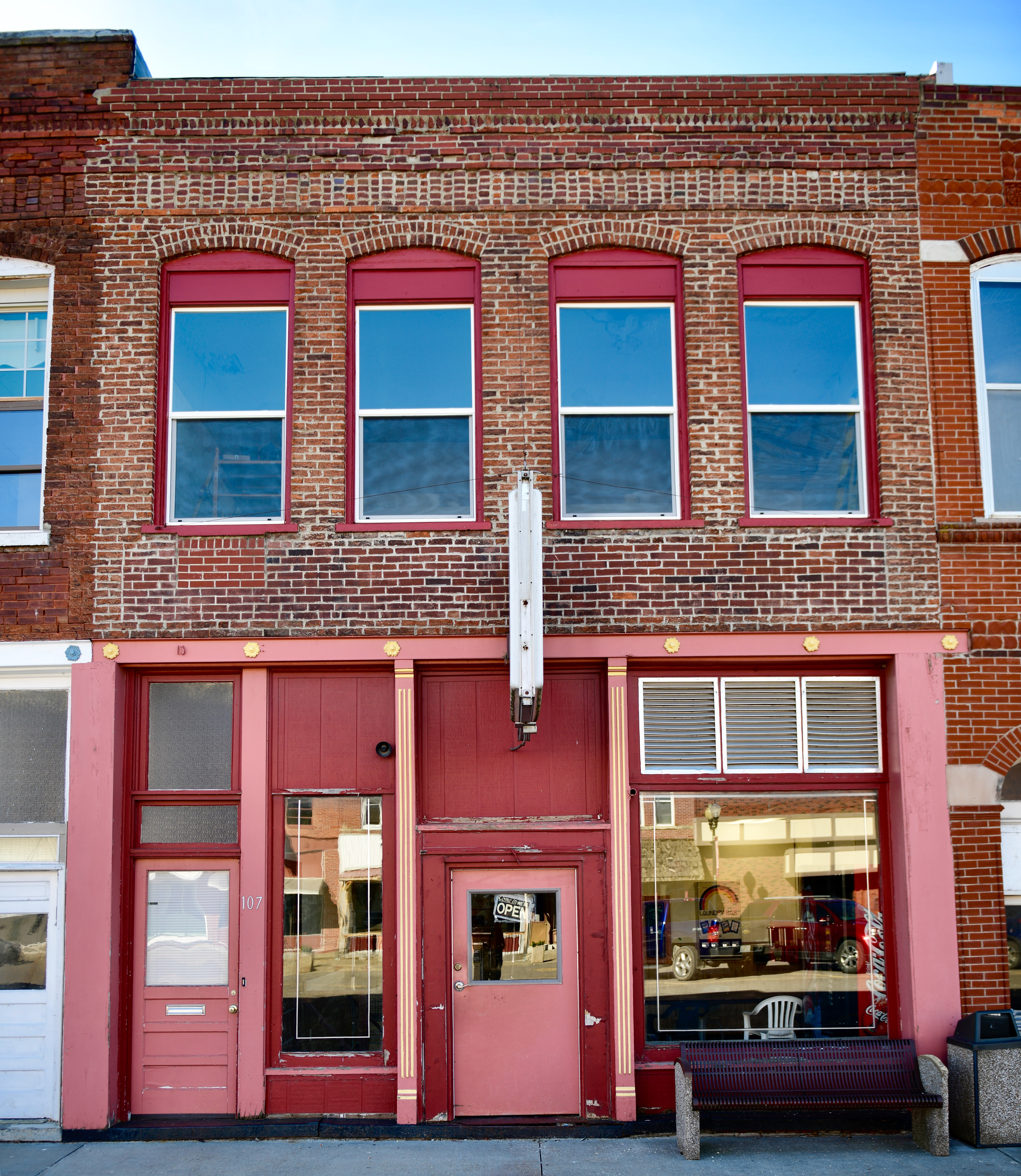
- Alsop’s General Store (c. 1894)

- Location within Missouri Location within the United States
- Location: 106-136 & 101-113 E. Broadway, New Franklin, Missouri
- Coordinates: 39°01′02″N 92°44′12″W
- Area: 3.85 acres (1.56 ha)
- Architectural style: Queen Anne, Romanesque
- NRHP reference No.: 12001207
- Added to NRHP: January 23, 2013

New Franklin Commercial Historic District, also known as Downtown New Franklin, is a national historic district located at New Franklin, Howard County, Missouri. The district encompasses 19 contributing buildings and 1 contributing object in the central business district of New Franklin. It developed between about 1894 and 1931 and includes representative examples of Queen Anne and Romanesque Revival style architecture. Notable contributing resources include the John B. and Logie R. Fleet House (c. 1895), U.S. Post Office (c. 1911), Home Electric Company Office (c. 1911), Carpenter and White Building (c. 1910), Bethke's German Cash Store (1909), Citizen's Bank (1894), and Santa Fe Trail Marker (1913).

It was listed on the National Register of Historic Places in 2013.
