= Glasgow Presbyterian Church =

Historic church in Missouri, United States

- U.S. National Register of Historic Places
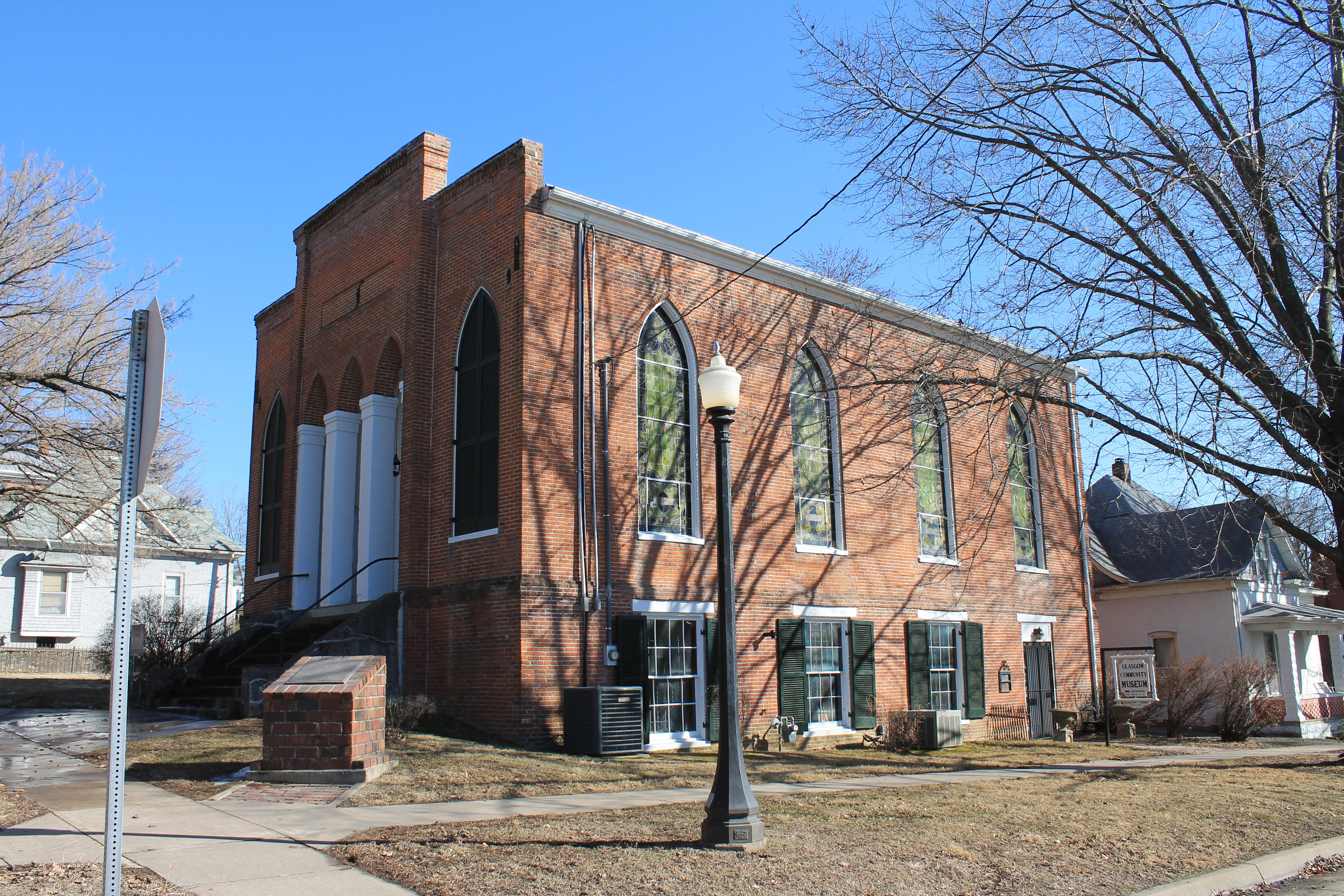

- Location within Missouri Location within the United States
- Location: Commerce and 4th Sts., Glasgow, Missouri
- Coordinates: 39°13′36″N 92°50′36″W
- Area: less than one acre
- Built: 1860-1861
- Architectural style: Gothic Revival
- NRHP reference No.: 82003141
- Added to NRHP: September 9, 1982

Glasgow Presbyterian Church, also known as Glasgow Community Museum, is a historic Presbyterian church located at Commerce and 4th Streets in Glasgow, Howard County, Missouri. It was built in 1860–1861, and is a one-story, brick building with simple Gothic Revival style design elements. The rectangular building measures 57 feet, 5 inches, by 37 feet, 3 inches, and features a board-and-batten vestibule and a Gothic arcade supported by brick pillars. It houses a local history museum.

It was listed on the National Register of Historic Places in 1982.
