= Chillicothe Commercial Historic District =

Historic district in Missouri, United States

- U.S. National Register of Historic Places
- U.S. Historic district
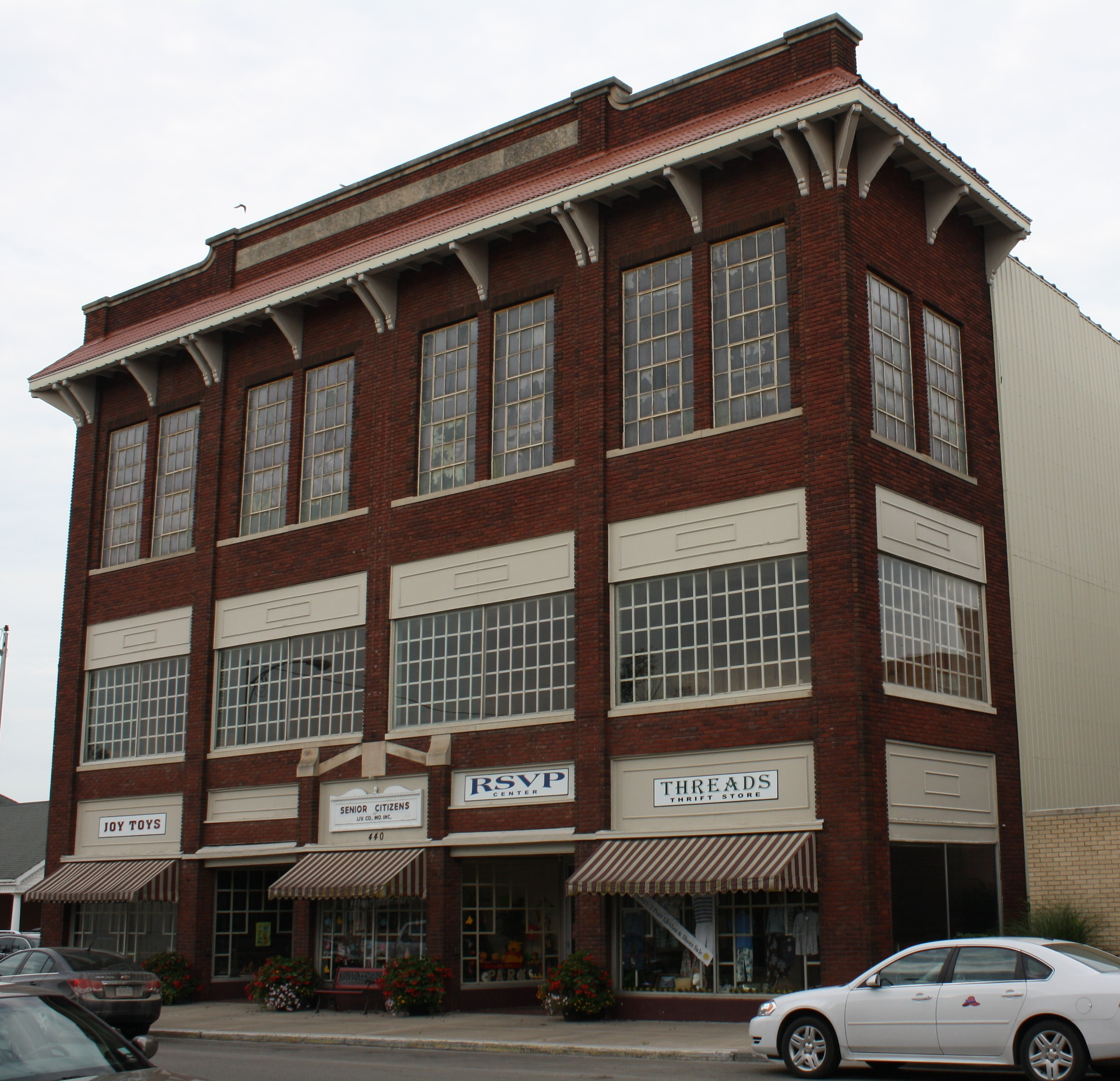
- 450 Locust, January 2008

- Location within Missouri Location within the United States
- Location: Roughly bounded Clay, Ann, Washington, and Locust Sts., Chillicothe, Missouri
- Coordinates: 39°47′32″N 93°33′09″W
- Area: 6.5 acres (2.6 ha)
- Built: 1889
- Architect: US Treasury, Supervising Architect
- Architectural style: Queen Anne, Italianate, Commercial Block
- MPS: Chillicothe, Missouri MPS
- NRHP reference No.: 02001176
- Added to NRHP: October 16, 2002

Chillicothe Commercial Historic District is a national historic district located at Chillicothe, Livingston County, Missouri. The district encompasses 24 contributing buildings in the central business district and surrounding residential area of Chillicothe. It developed between about 1889 and 1950, and includes representative examples of Queen Anne, Italianate, Beaux Arts, Mission Revival, and Art Deco style architecture. Notable buildings include the Scruby Brothers Building (1893), S. A. Stone Building (c. 1894), Dairy Creme Building (c. 1950), Strand Coffee Shop Building (1936), Strand Hotel and Garage (1925), Norman & Jarvis Funeral Home Building (c. 1916), Empire Theatre (1916), Chillicothe Post Office/Federal Building (1916), Grace & Simpson Apartments (1916), and Loomis Building/Chillicothe Post Office (1898).

It was listed on the National Register of Historic Places in 2002.
