= Inglewood (Glasgow, Missouri) =

Historic house in Missouri, United States

- U.S. National Register of Historic Places
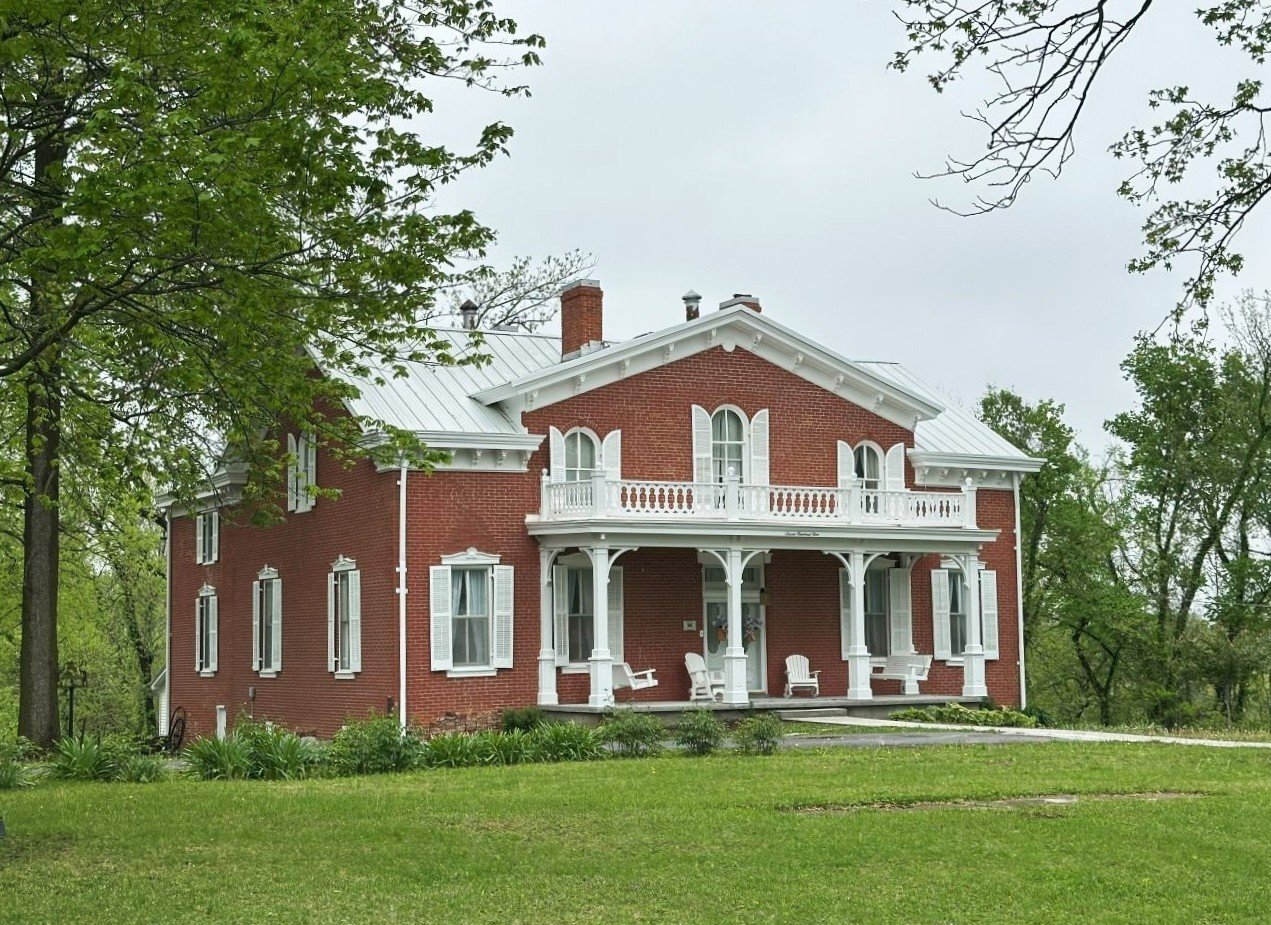
- Inglewood in 2025

- Location within Missouri Location within the United States
- Location: 701 Randolph St. Glasgow, Missouri
- Coordinates: 39°13′48″N 92°50′18″W
- Area: less than one acre
- Built: 1857
- Architectural style: Italianate
- NRHP reference No.: 90000981
- Added to NRHP: June 21, 1990

Inglewood, also known as the Thomas and Emma Jane Donohoe Cockerill House and Petticoat House, is a historic home located at Glasgow, Howard County, Missouri. It was built in 1857, and is a two-story, Italianate style red brick dwelling with a two-story rear ell. It features a full-width front porch with square wooden columns.

It was listed on the National Register of Historic Places in 1990.
