= Harris-Chilton-Ruble House =

Historic house in Missouri, United States

- U.S. National Register of Historic Places
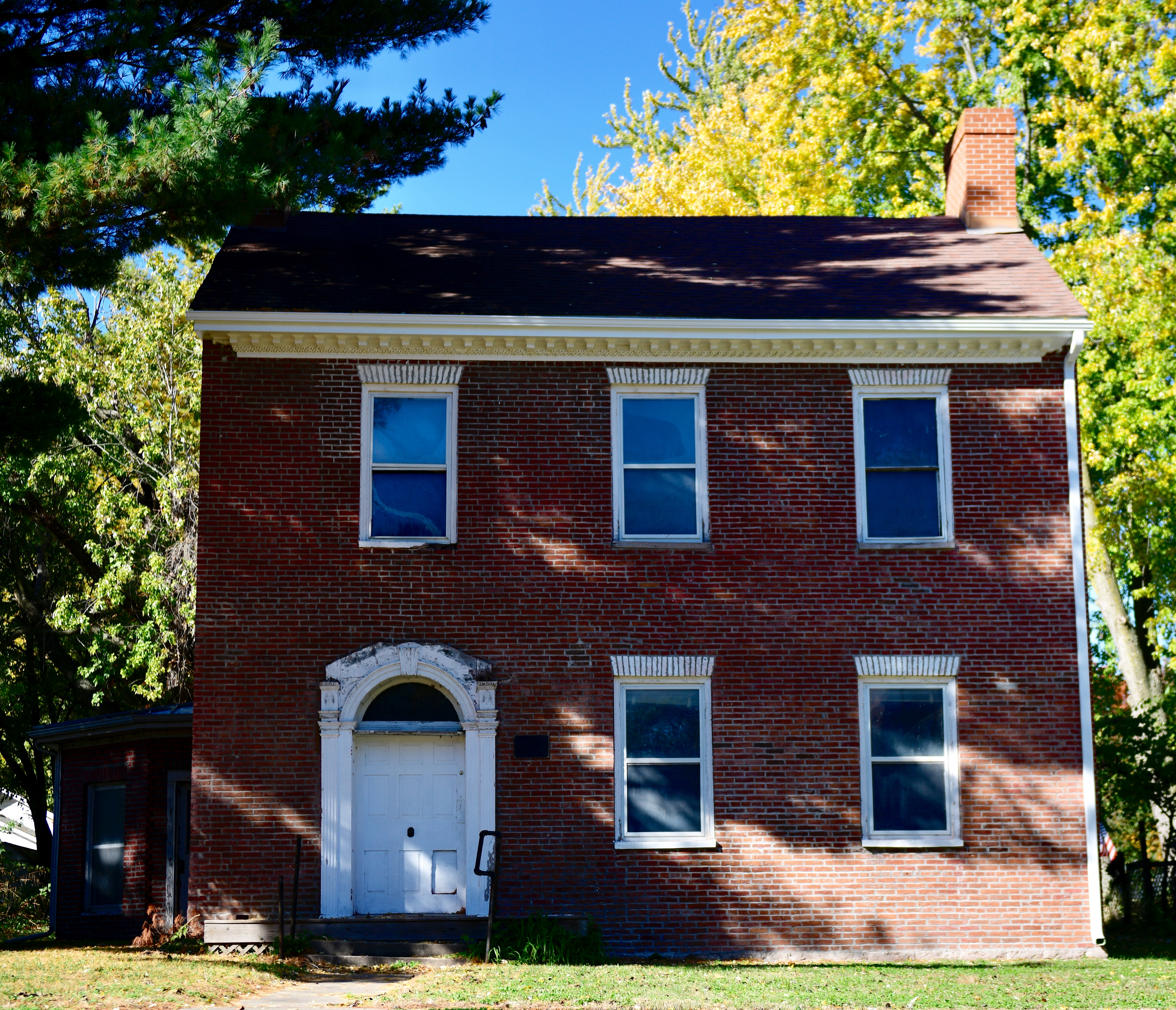

- Location within Missouri Location within the United States
- Location: 108 N. Missouri Ave. New Franklin, Missouri
- Coordinates: 39°1′12″N 92°44′28″W
- Area: less than one acre
- Built: 1832
- Architectural style: Federal
- NRHP reference No.: 80002359
- Added to NRHP: September 4, 1980

Harris-Chilton-Ruble House, also known as the Chilton House, is a historic home located at New Franklin, Howard County, Missouri. It was built about 1832, and is a two-story, three-bay, Federal style brick dwelling. It has a gable roof with projecting cornice and a Victorian era front porch.

It was listed on the National Register of Historic Places in 1982.
