= Glasgow, Missouri =

- City
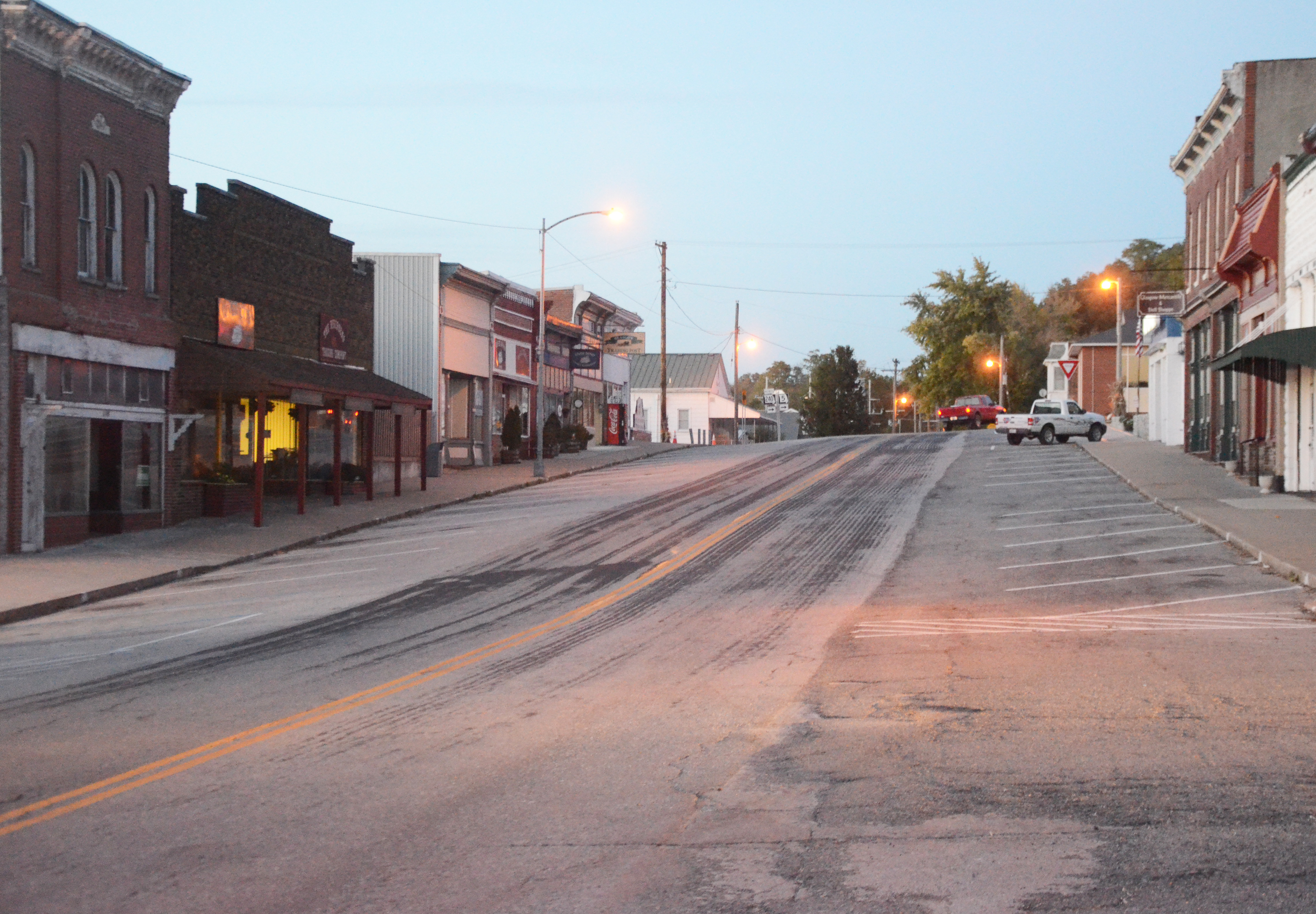
- 1st Street in Glasgow

- Location of Glasgow, Missouri
- Coordinates: 39°13′35″N 92°50′49″W
- Country: United States
- State: Missouri
- Counties: Howard, Chariton

Area
  - Total: 1.36 sq mi (3.53 km^{2})
  - Land: 1.35 sq mi (3.49 km^{2})
  - Water: 0.015 sq mi (0.04 km^{2})
- Elevation: 719 ft (219 m)

Population (2020)
  - Total: 1,087
  - Density: 807.3/sq mi (311.69/km^{2})
- Time zone: UTC−6 (Central (CST))
  - Summer (DST): UTC−5 (CDT)
- ZIP Code: 65254
- Area code: 660
- FIPS code: 29-27208
- GNIS feature ID: 2394909
- Website: City website

Glasgow is a city on the Missouri River mostly in northwest Howard County and extending into the southeast corner of Chariton County in Missouri, United States. The population was 1,087 at the 2020 census.

The Howard County portion of Glasgow is part of the Columbia, Missouri Metropolitan Statistical Area.

== History ==
Glasgow was laid out and platted in 1836, partially from land acquired from former Missouri State Treasurer James Earickson The city was named for James Glasgow, a local merchant. A post office called Glasgow has been in operation since 1837.

The Battle of Glasgow was fought on October 15, 1864, in and near Glasgow as part of Price's Missouri Expedition during the American Civil War. Although the battle resulted in a Confederate victory and the capture of significant war material, it had little long-term benefit as Price was ultimately defeated at Westport a week later, bringing his campaign in Missouri to an end.

There is a historical record of extrajudicial violence. On January 20, 1891, an African American man, Olli Truxton, was killed by a white lynch mob in Glasgow. On August 3, 1884, an African American man, Harrison Mickey, was killed by a black lynch mob in Glasgow.

The Campbell Chapel African Methodist Episcopal Church, Glasgow Commercial Historic District, Glasgow Presbyterian Church, Glasgow Public Library, and Inglewood are listed on the National Register of Historic Places.

On April 27, 2026 during a significant tornado outbreak, a strong tornado struck Glasgow causing damage roof damage in town. No fatalities or injuries occurred from the tornado.

== Geography ==
The city is on the bank of the Missouri River. It is served by Missouri routes 5, 87 and 240. Greggs Creek flows past the south side of the community.

According to the United States Census Bureau, the city has a total area of 1.42 square miles (3.68 km^{2}), of which 1.30 square miles (3.37 km^{2}) is land and 0.12 square miles (0.31 km^{2}) is water.

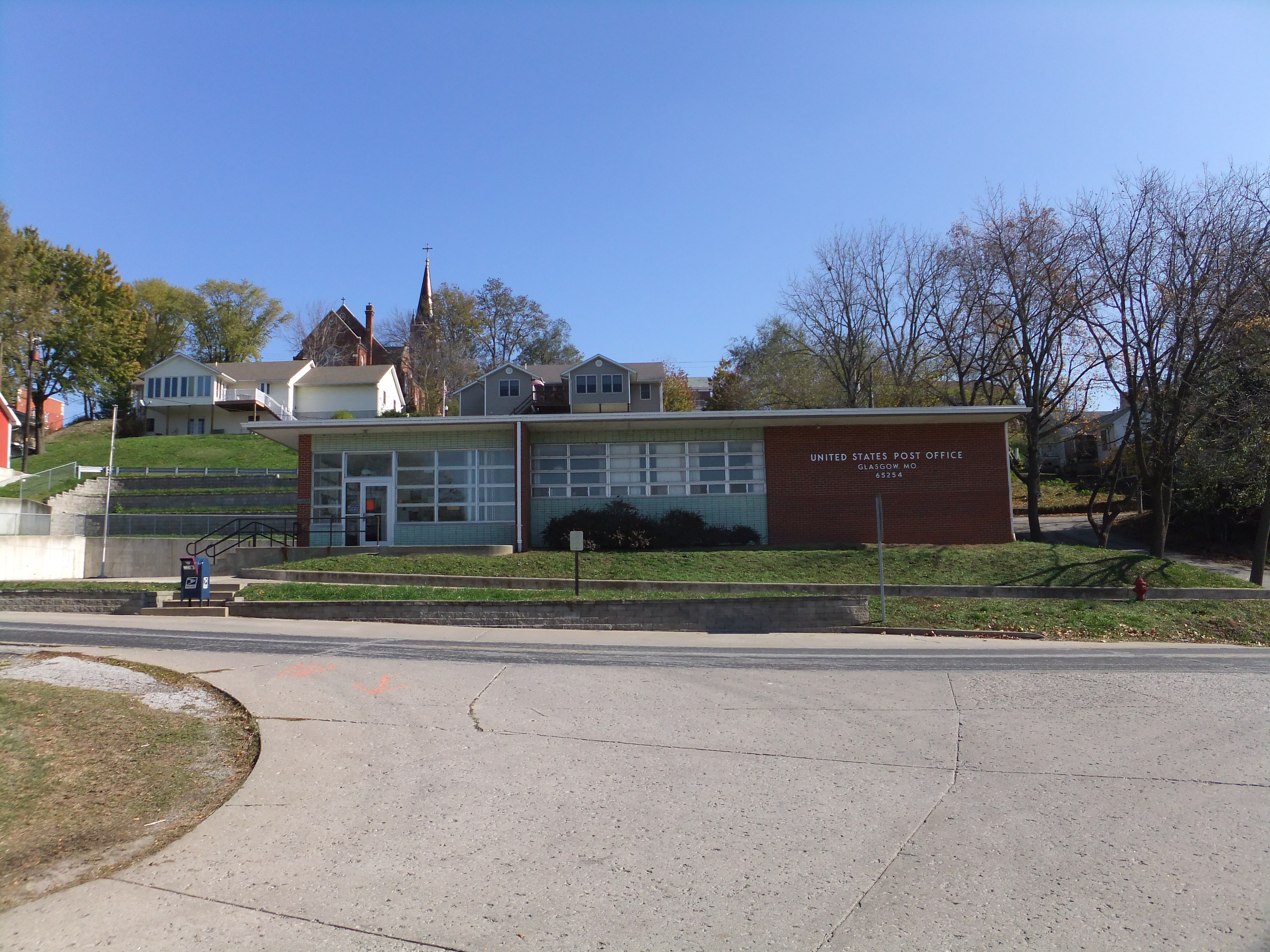
Post office in Glasgow

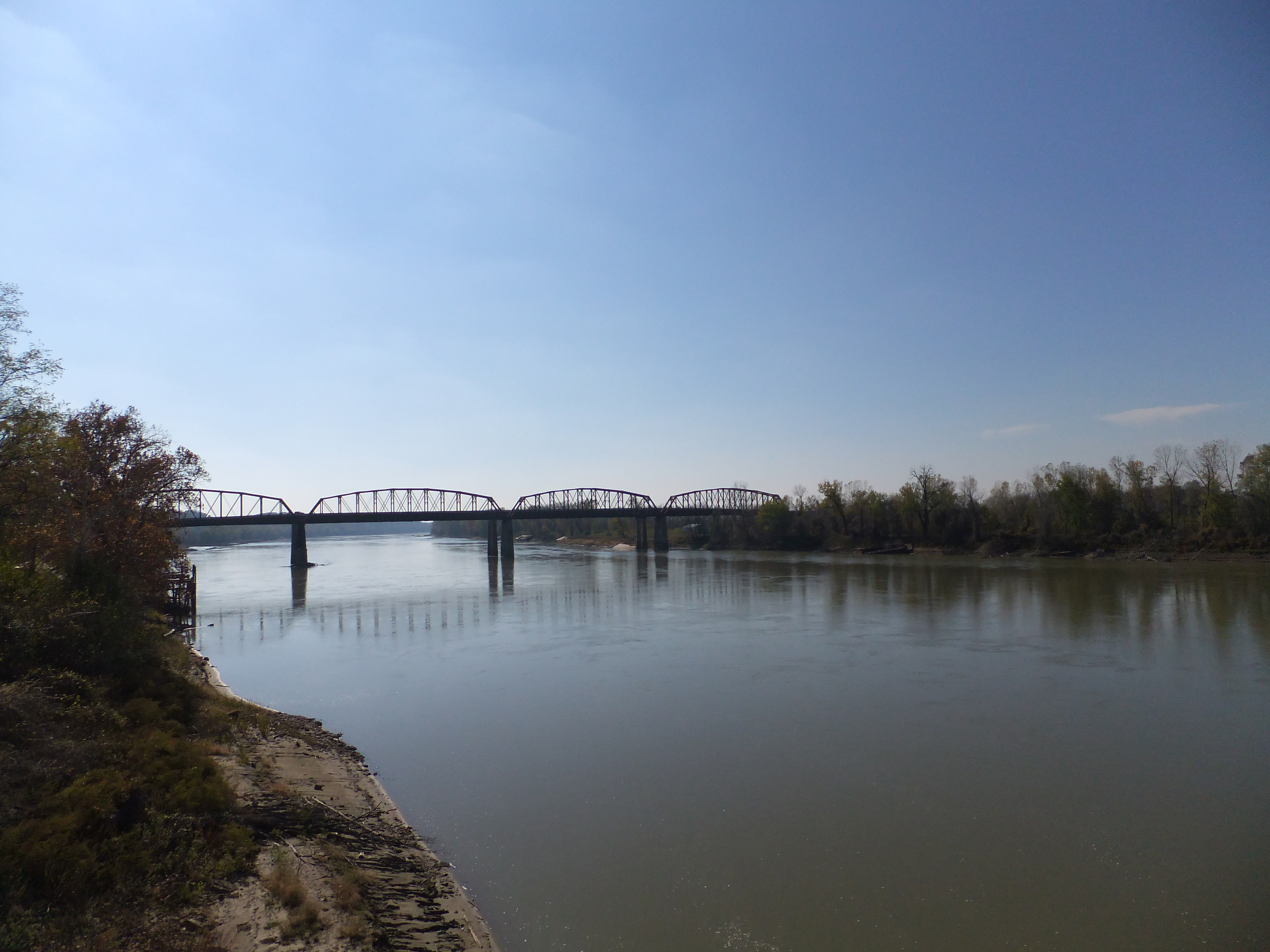
Looking south on the Missouri River at Glasgow

== Demographics ==
Historical population
Census	Pop.	Note	%±
1860	1,035		—
1870	1,795		73.4%
1880	1,841		2.6%
1890	1,781		−3.3%
1900	1,672		−6.1%
1910	1,607		−3.9%
1920	1,351		−15.9%
1930	1,409		4.3%
1940	1,490		5.7%
1950	1,440		−3.4%
1960	1,200		−16.7%
1970	1,336		11.3%
1980	1,336		0.0%
1990	1,295		−3.1%
2000	1,263		−2.5%
2010	1,103		−12.7%
2020	1,087		−1.5%
U.S. Decennial Census

=== 2020 census ===
As of the census of 2020, there were 1,087 people, 452 households, and 245 families living in the city. 86.4% White, 7.3% African American, 0.01% Native American, 0.2% Asian, 0.3% from other races, and 5.5 from two or more races. Hispanic or Latino people of any race were 1.4% of the population.

=== 2010 census ===
As of the census of 2010, there were 1,103 people, 458 households, and 277 families living in the city. The population density was 848.5 inhabitants per square mile (327.6/km^{2}). There were 533 housing units at an average density of 410.0 units per square mile (158.3 units/km^{2}). The racial makeup of the city was 89.8% White, 7.9% African American, 0.1% Native American, 0.3% Asian, and 2.0% from two or more races. Hispanic or Latino people of any race were 1.5% of the population.

There were 458 households, of which 29.3% had children under the age of 18 living with them, 46.7% were married couples living together, 9.0% had a female householder with no husband present, 4.8% had a male householder with no wife present, and 39.5% were non-families. Of all households, 35.4% were made up of individuals, and 15% had someone living alone who was 65 years of age or older. The average household size was 2.31 and the average family size was 3.00.

The median age in the city was 41.9 years. 25.7% of residents were under the age of 18; 6.1% were between the ages of 18 and 24; 21.7% were from 25 to 44; 28% were from 45 to 64; and 18.5% were 65 years of age or older. The gender makeup of the city was 47.2% male and 52.8% female.

=== 2000 census ===
As of the census of 2000, there were 1,263 people, 495 households, and 317 families living in the city. The population density was 946.1 inhabitants per square mile (365.3/km^{2}). There were 562 housing units at an average density of 421.0 units per square mile (162.5 units/km^{2}). The racial makeup of the city was 89.87% White, 8.47% African American, 0.16% Native American, 0.08% Asian, 0.63% from other races, and 0.79% from two or more races. Hispanic or Latino people of any race were 0.79% of the population.

There were 495 households, out of which 33.5% had children under the age of 18 living with them, 50.1% were married couples living together, 10.9% had a female householder with no husband present, and 35.8% were non-families. Of all households, 33.3% were made up of individuals, and 16.6% had someone living alone who was 65 years of age or older. The average household size was 2.45 and the average family size was 3.14.

In the city the population was spread out, with 27.2% under the age of 18, 7.8% from 18 to 24, 25.7% from 25 to 44, 20.0% from 45 to 64, and 19.3% who were 65 years of age or older. The median age was 38 years. For every 100 females, there were 87.1 males. For every 100 females age 18 and over, there were 83.8 males.

The median income for a household in the city was $30,242, and the median income for a family was $36,806. Males had a median income of $24,188 versus $17,130 for females. The per capita income for the city was $14,544. About 7.1% of families and 10.8% of the population were below the poverty line, including 15.6% of those under age 18 and 11.2% of those age 65 or over.

== Education ==
Public education in Glasgow is administered by Glasgow School District, which operates one elementary school, one middle school and Glasgow High School.

Glasgow has a lending library, the Lewis Library Of Glasgow.

== Notable people ==
- Wild Bill Davis (1918–1995), jazz pianist
- John Wesley Donaldson (1891–1970), born in Glasgow, baseball pitcher whose career spanned over 30 years and included many different Negro league baseball teams
- Harold Kottman (1922–2004), former member of the Boston Celtics
- Jesse M. Roper (1851–1901), naval officer
- Harry H. Vaughan (1893–1981), military aide to Harry S. Truman
