= A&P Food Stores Building =

- U.S. National Register of Historic Places
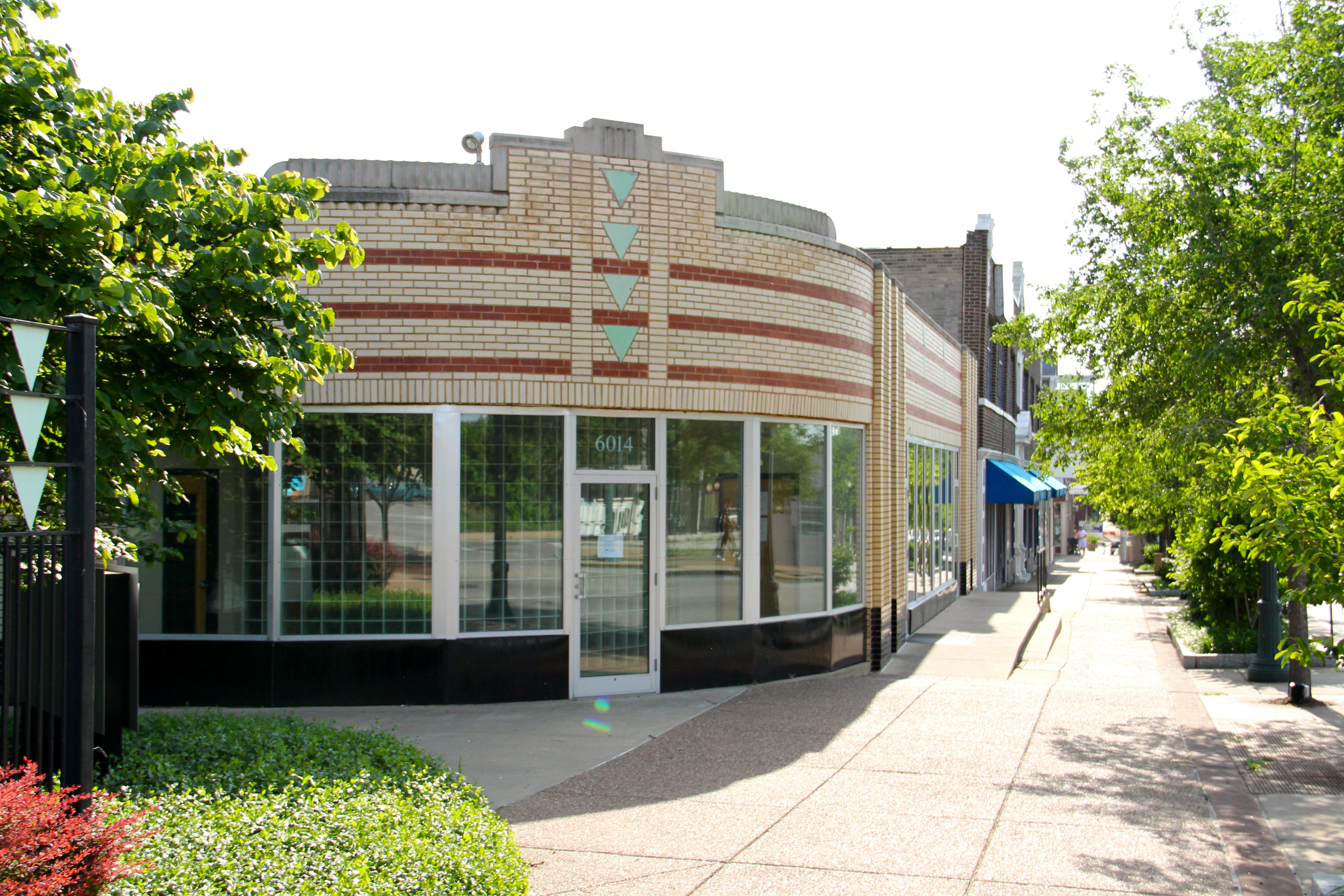

- Location within St. Louis Location within Missouri Location within the United States
- Location: 6016, 6014, and 6018 Delmar, St. Louis, Missouri
- Coordinates: 38°39′16″N 90°17′41″W
- Built: 1940
- Architect: Saum Architects
- Architectural style: Art Deco, Moderne
- NRHP reference No.: 00001171
- Added to NRHP: October 15, 2000

The A&P Food Stores Building is an Art Deco-style commercial building designed by Saum Architects in St. Louis, Missouri, United States. Built in 1940, it was one of the few small commercial buildings in St. Louis designed in the Art Deco style. The building was also significant as having been one of the first supermarkets in St. Louis that was developed to serve automobile-owning customers, providing parking and convenient "one-stop shopping".

There were as many as 84 A&P stores in the city, 20 being supermarkets and the others being cash and carry stores; this building is one of the last surviving of these, and it was among those which kept operating up until A&P entirely left the city in 1979–1980.

It was listed on the National Register of Historic Places in 2000.

== See also ==
- The Great Atlantic & Pacific Tea Company, food store chain
