= Thomas Hickman House =

Historic house in Missouri, United States

- U.S. National Register of Historic Places
- Location within Missouri Location within the United States
- Location: 10 Research Center Rd., New Franklin, Missouri
- Coordinates: 39°1′22″N 92°45′37″W
- Area: less than one acre
- Architectural style: Colonial Revival
- NRHP reference No.: 06000627
- Added to NRHP: July 19, 2006

The Thomas Hickman House is a historic home in Howard County, Missouri. It is a brick, Georgian-style house, built by businessman Thomas Hickman in 1819. It was added to the National Register of Historic Places in July 2006.

== Architecture ==
Built in 1819, the 1,800-square-foot (170 m^{2}) house represents southern Georgian-cottage style and is one of the state's oldest intact brick houses. The 1 1/2-story structure was constructed of hand-made brick and built on a stone foundation. The large 8-foot-wide (2.4 m) central hallway provides access to three of the four main rooms and an unfinished attic.

== History ==
=== Thomas Hickman ===
Thomas Hickman was a local businessman and one of the original settlers of Howard County. The property is located two miles from Old Franklin, the site where William Becknell and his party began the legendary Santa Fe Trail in 1821. Hickman and his wife Sarah M. Prewitt came to the Boonslick area of Missouri from Bourbon County, Kentucky, around 1816. One of Hickman's business ventures included a partnership with Wm. Lamme & Co., a dry goods and hardware business in Old Franklin.

The house now sits on the property of the University of Missouri Horticulture and Agroforestry Research Center.

=== Restoration ===
A $1.3 million rehabilitation was completed in 2009 to bring the home to its historic condition. While the house was in decay, restoration-construction experts had much original material to work with: exterior brick, stone foundation, floor joists, walnut flooring, cabinets, sills, interior molding and chair rails. Rehabilitation efforts included pouring a new foundation; restoring original window size and replacing panes and sashes; re-shingling the roof in period materials; removing paint from and stabilizing exterior brick; refinishing original floors and woodwork; and restoring interior plaster. In addition, the four chimneys were rebuilt from a state of disrepair, and a summer kitchen was reconstructed based on archaeological and historical information.
