= Fayette Courthouse Square Historic District =

Historic district in Missouri, United States

- U.S. National Register of Historic Places
- U.S. Historic district
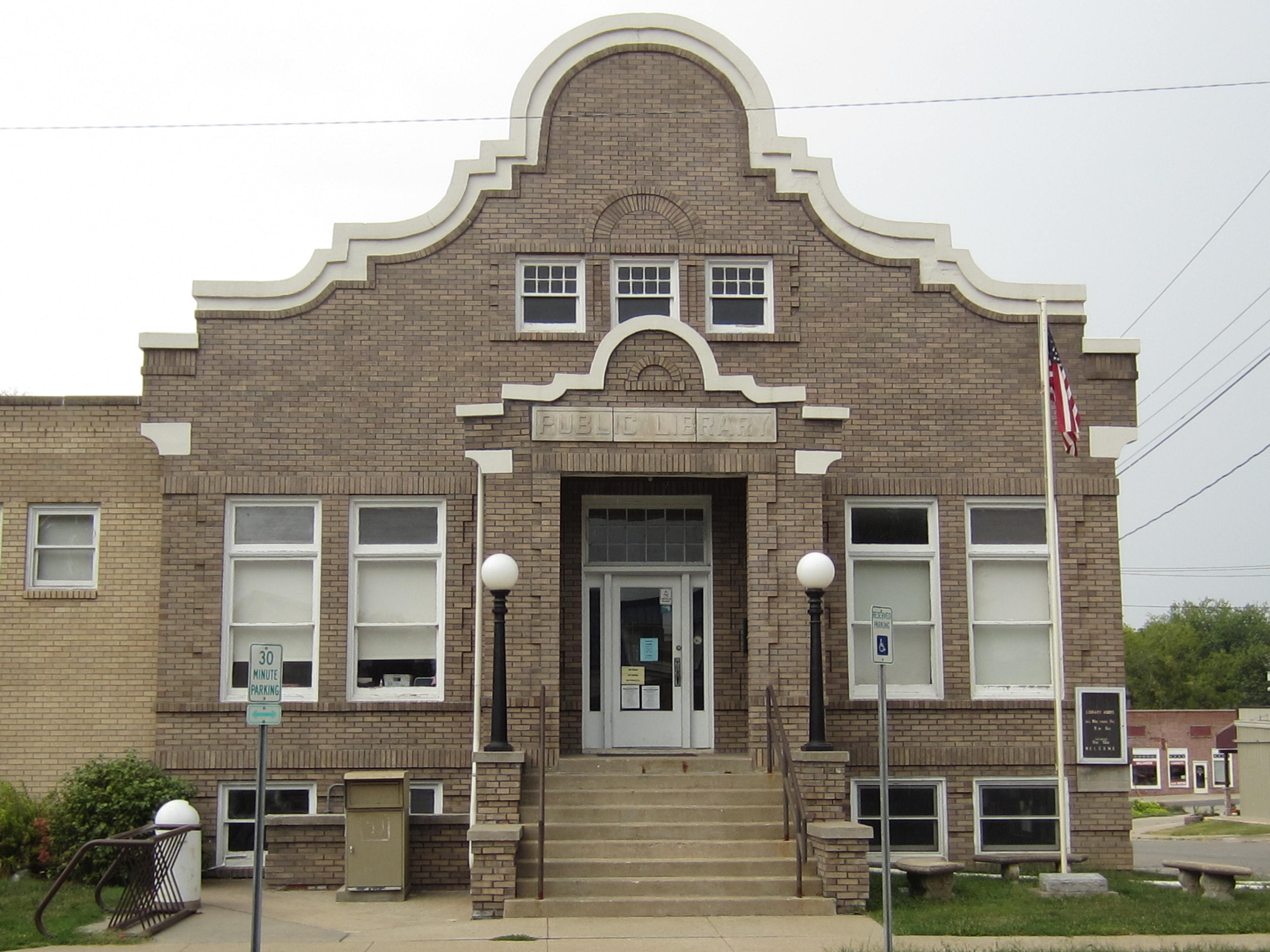
- Fayette Public Library (1914), September 2013

- Location within Missouri Location within the United States
- Location: Roughly along S. Main and N. Main, W. Morrison, E. Morrison, N. Church, and W. Davis Sts., Fayette, Missouri
- Coordinates: 39°08′45″N 92°40′57″W
- Area: 11 acres (4.5 ha)
- Architect: Etz, Carl; Davis, A.F., et al.
- Architectural style: Italianate, Second Empire, Romanesque
- NRHP reference No.: 98000069
- Added to NRHP: February 5, 1998

Fayette Courthouse Square Historic District is a national historic district located at Fayette, Howard County, Missouri. The district encompasses 35 contributing buildings in the central business district of Fayette. It developed between about 1828 and 1947 and includes representative examples of Second Empire, Italianate, and Romanesque Revival style architecture. Located in the district is the separately listed Dr. Uriel S. Wright Office. Other notable buildings include the Fayette Public Library (1914), City Hall (1925), New Opera House Block (1903), A. F. Davis Bank (c. 1885), Commercial Bank (1910), The New Century Block Building (1902), Bell Block Building (1883), U.S. Post Office Building (1925), Howard County Jail and Residence (c. 1889-1894), and Howard County Courthouse (1887).

It was listed on the National Register of Historic Places in 1998.
