= Fayette Residential Historic District =

Historic district in Missouri, United States

- U.S. National Register of Historic Places
- U.S. Historic district
- Location within Missouri Location within the United States
- Location: Roughly bounded by Church St., W. Morrison St. and Cleveland Ave., Fayette, Missouri
- Coordinates: 39°08′35″N 92°41′08″W
- Area: 126 acres (51 ha)
- Architect: Megraw, Joseph; Megraw, W.J.
- Architectural style: Gothic Revival, Queen Anne, Italianate
- MPS: Historic and Architectural Resources of Fayette, Missouri
- NRHP reference No.: 09000681
- Added to NRHP: September 3, 2009

Fayette Residential Historic District is a national historic district located at Fayette, Howard County, Missouri. The district encompasses 308 contributing buildings and 2 contributing structures in a predominantly residential section of Fayette. It developed between about 1832 and 1956 and includes representative examples of Gothic Revival, Italianate, and Queen Anne style architecture. Located in the district is the separately listed Coleman Hall. Other notable buildings include the Hampton L. Boon House / George Carson House (c. 1832), W. W. Blakemore House (c. 1905), John Sears House / John B. Clark House (a. 1835, 1900), McKinney Sisters House (c. 1900), Tully Chenowith House (c. 1925), Methodist Episcopal Parsonage (c. 1890), T. A. F. Mitchell House (c. 1935), Oliver H. P. Corprew House (1880s), Huntington Hall, A. F. Davis House (1880-1884), R. Lee Maupin House (1905), Mrs. John H. Farrington House (c. 1915), the Daly School (1924), the T. A. Grigsby Building (c. 1930), and St. Joseph's Catholic Church (1956).

It was listed on the National Register of Historic Places in 2009.
