= Coleman Hall =

Historic house in Missouri, United States

- U.S. National Register of Historic Places
- U.S. Historic district – Contributing property
- Location within Missouri Location within the United States
- Location: 502 N. Linn, Fayette, Missouri
- Coordinates: 39°8′55″N 92°41′10″W
- Area: less than one acre
- Built: 1874
- Architectural style: Mixed (more Than 2 Styles From Different Periods), Italianate, Late Georgian
- NRHP reference No.: 86001326
- Added to NRHP: June 11, 1986

Coleman Hall, also known as the President's House, is a historic home located at Fayette, Howard County, Missouri. It was built in 1874, and is a two-story, double pile, brick dwelling with a two-story rear ell. It has a central hall plan in the Late Georgian style and Italianate style design elements. The hipped roof is topped by a cupola. It was built to be donated as a president's house for Central Methodist College.

It was listed on the National Register of Historic Places in 1986. It is located in the Fayette Residential Historic District.
