= St. Mary's Episcopal Church (Fayette, Missouri) =

Historic church in Missouri, United States

- U.S. National Register of Historic Places
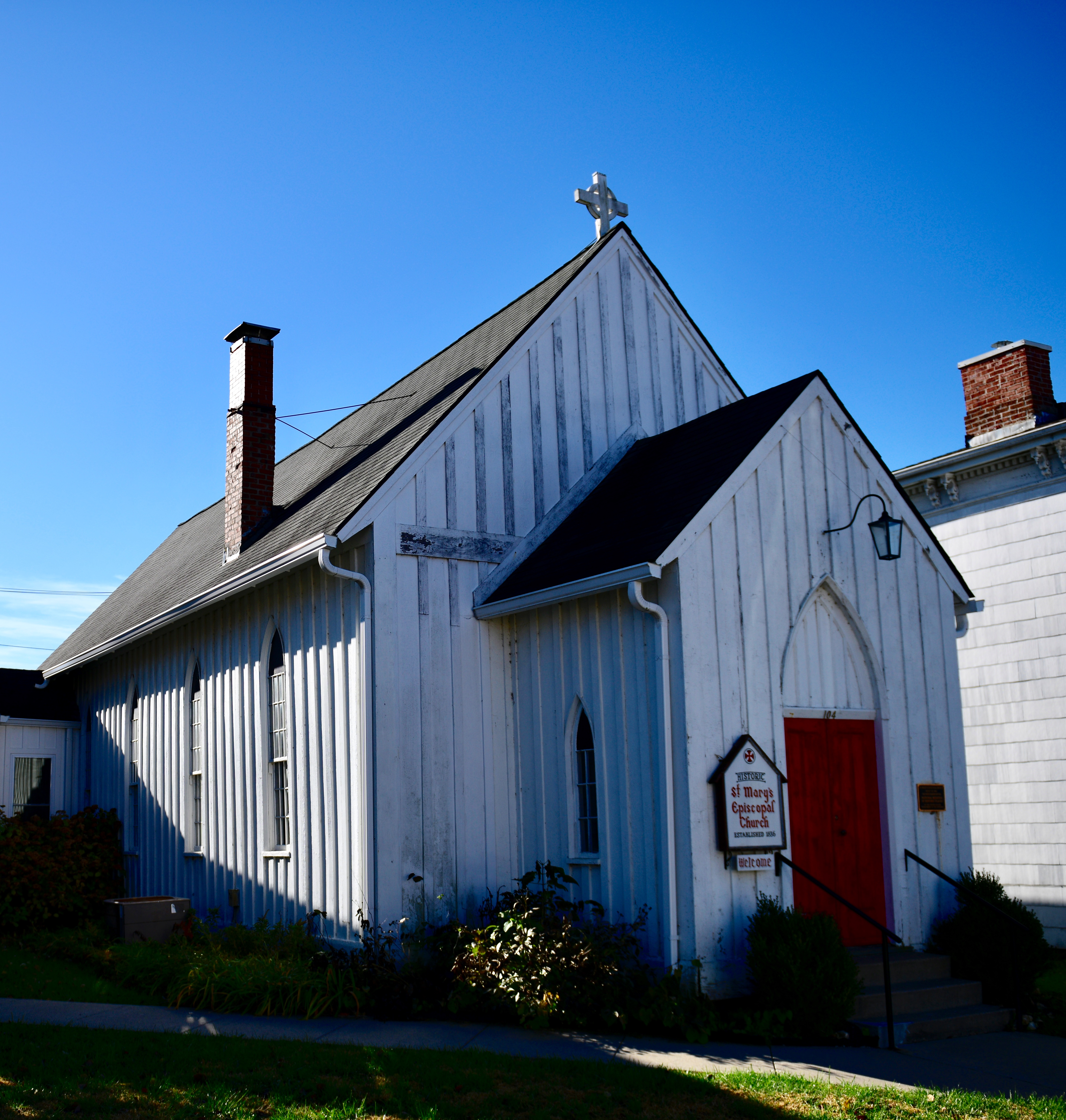

- Location within Missouri Location within the United States
- Location: 104 W. Davis St. Fayette, Missouri
- Coordinates: 39°8′46″N 92°41′6″W
- Area: less than one acre
- Built: 1849
- Architect: Nipper, W.H.
- Architectural style: Gothic Revival
- NRHP reference No.: 82003139
- Added to NRHP: September 9, 1982

St. Mary's Episcopal Church is a historic Episcopal church of the Episcopal Diocese of West Missouri located at 104 West Davis Street in Fayette, Howard County, Missouri. The Gothic Revival style church structure was built in 1849, and is a small rectangular one-story structure constructed of vertical board and batten on a brick foundation. It measures 18 feet by 50 feet with an additional vestibule area which measures 8 feet by 10 feet.

The Episcopal Church came to Missouri two years before the creation of the state, in the person of the Rev. John Ward, who arrived in St. Louis in 1819. It was not until 1835, however, at the General Convention of the Church in Philadelphia that the Missionary Diocese of Missouri was created, and its first bishop, the Rev. Jackson Kemper, was consecrated.

In August 1836 the Rev. Fredrick Foote Peake, a deacon, was appointed Missionary for Central Missouri following an earlier visit to the area by Bishop Kemper. Rev. Peake was sent to Boonville. This community, along with the thriving village of Franklin (located across the Missouri River and the second largest community in Missouri), and Fayette (the newly created seat of Howard County) contained a number of people of the Episcopal Church.

It was listed on the National Register of Historic Places in 1982.
