= Dr. Uriel S. Wright Office =

- U.S. National Register of Historic Places
- U.S. Historic district – Contributing property
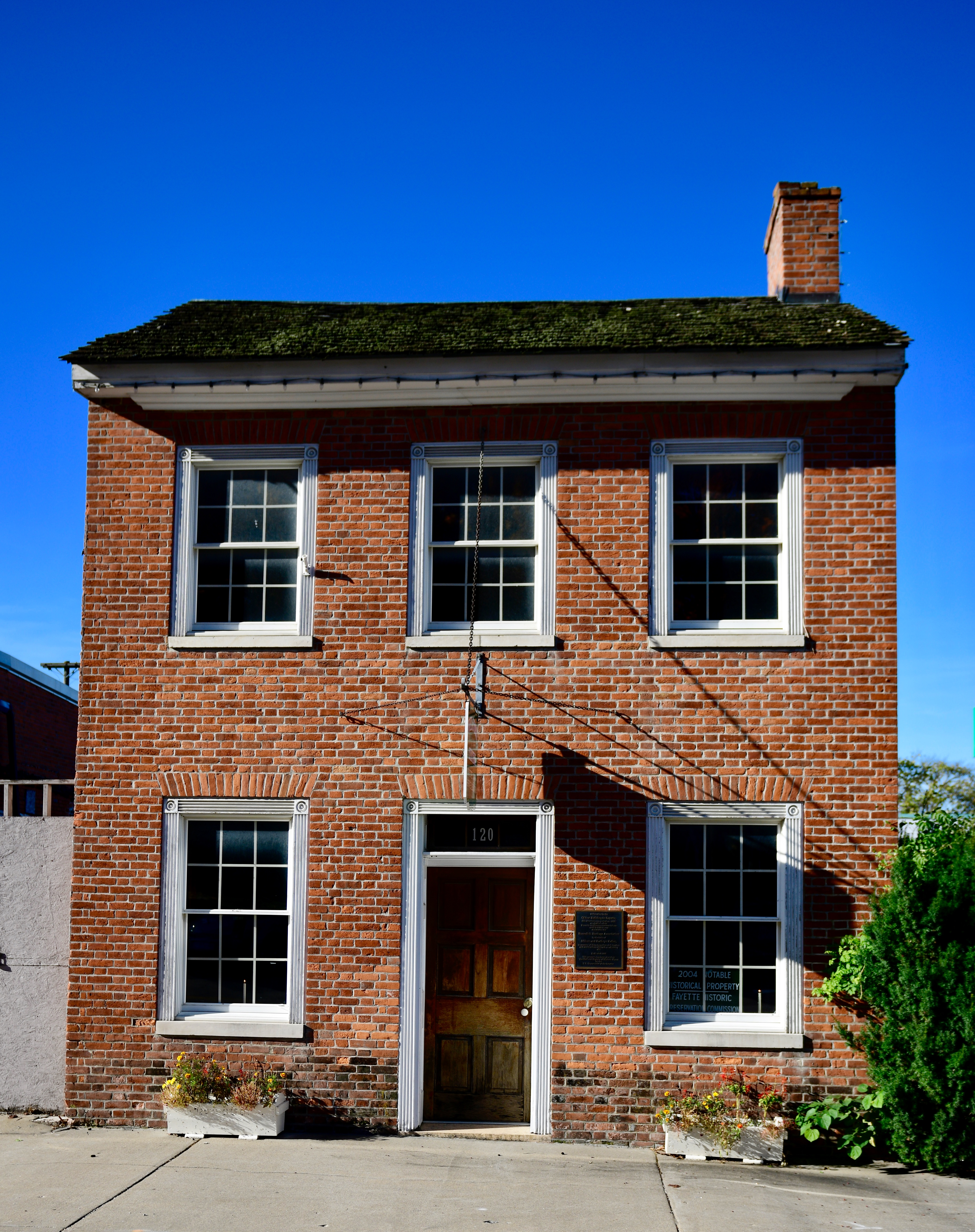

- Location within Missouri Location within the United States
- Location: 120 Church St. Fayette, Missouri
- Coordinates: 39°8′49″N 92°41′1″W
- Area: less than one acre
- Built: 1828-1832
- Architectural style: Federal, Vernacular Federal
- NRHP reference No.: 87001727
- Added to NRHP: December 22, 1987

Dr. Uriel S. Wright Office is a historic doctor's office located at Fayette, Howard County, Missouri. It was built between 1828 and 1832, and is a small two-story, Federal style brick building. The building measures 19 feet square and features decorative window surrounds.

It was listed on the National Register of Historic Places in 1987. It is located in the Fayette Courthouse Square Historic District.
