= Rivercene =

Historic house in Missouri, United States

- U.S. National Register of Historic Places
- Location within Missouri Location within the United States
- Location: R.F.D. 1, near New Franklin, Missouri
- Coordinates: 38°59′18.7″N 92°44′38.6″W
- Area: 270 acres (110 ha)
- Built: 1869
- Architect: Osborn, G.W.
- Architectural style: Second Empire
- NRHP reference No.: 73001039
- Added to NRHP: February 16, 1973

Rivercene is a historic home located near New Franklin, Howard County, Missouri. It was built in 1869, and is a two-story, nearly square, Second Empire style orange-colored brick dwelling with two wings. It features a slate mansard roof and four wood porches. It was the home of Missouri and Mississippi River steamboat captain Joseph Beeler Kinney.

It was listed on the National Register of Historic Places in 1973.
