= New Franklin, Missouri =

- City
- Location of New Franklin, Missouri
- Coordinates: 39°0′58″N 92°44′18″W
- Country: United States
- State: Missouri
- County: Howard

Government
  - Type: Mayor-Alderman Government
  - Mayor: Daniel Yount

Area
  - Total: 1.34 sq mi (3.46 km^{2})
  - Land: 1.32 sq mi (3.43 km^{2})
  - Water: 0.012 sq mi (0.03 km^{2})
- Elevation: 646 ft (197 m)

Population (2020)
  - Total: 1,027
  - Density: 775.4/sq mi (299.37/km^{2})
- Time zone: UTC-6 (Central (CST))
  - Summer (DST): UTC-5 (CDT)
- ZIP code: 65274
- Area code: 660
- FIPS code: 29-51824
- GNIS feature ID: 0723198
- Website: www.newfranklinmo.org

New Franklin is a city in Howard County, Missouri, United States. The population was 1,027 at the 2020 census. It is part of the Columbia, Missouri Metropolitan Statistical Area.

The community is 0.25 miles (0.40 km) northeast of and uphill from Franklin, a flood-prone historic community which was the eastern terminus of the Santa Fe Trail.

== History ==
Franklin was laid out in 1816. Due to the town's frequent flooding, Franklin was relocated up the hill in 1826, giving rise to the community of New Franklin. Franklin's name is taken from the name of Benjamin Franklin.

The Harris-Chilton-Ruble House, Thomas Hickman House, New Franklin Commercial Historic District, and Rivercene are listed on the National Register of Historic Places.

== Geography ==
New Franklin is located at 39°0′58″N 92°44′18″W (39.016071, -92.738308). According to the United States Census Bureau, the city has a total area of 1.34 square miles (3.47 km^{2}), of which 1.33 square miles (3.44 km^{2}) is land and 0.01 square miles (0.03 km^{2}) is water.

=== Climate ===
Climate data for New Franklin, Missouri (1991–2020 normals, extremes 1956–present)
| Month | Jan | Feb | Mar | Apr | May | Jun | Jul | Aug | Sep | Oct | Nov | Dec | Year |
|---|---|---|---|---|---|---|---|---|---|---|---|---|---|
| Record high °F (°C) | 75 (24) | 81 (27) | 85 (29) | 92 (33) | 94 (34) | 104 (40) | 109 (43) | 106 (41) | 101 (38) | 94 (34) | 83 (28) | 76 (24) | 109 (43) |
| Mean maximum °F (°C) | 62.4 (16.9) | 68.1 (20.1) | 77.7 (25.4) | 83.7 (28.7) | 87.9 (31.1) | 92.4 (33.6) | 96.3 (35.7) | 96.9 (36.1) | 91.8 (33.2) | 85.2 (29.6) | 74.0 (23.3) | 65.5 (18.6) | 98.4 (36.9) |
| Mean daily maximum °F (°C) | 37.8 (3.2) | 43.0 (6.1) | 54.4 (12.4) | 65.2 (18.4) | 74.6 (23.7) | 83.2 (28.4) | 87.2 (30.7) | 86.3 (30.2) | 79.0 (26.1) | 67.5 (19.7) | 54.0 (12.2) | 42.4 (5.8) | 64.5 (18.1) |
| Daily mean °F (°C) | 28.1 (−2.2) | 32.8 (0.4) | 43.4 (6.3) | 54.0 (12.2) | 64.3 (17.9) | 73.3 (22.9) | 77.2 (25.1) | 75.5 (24.2) | 67.5 (19.7) | 55.6 (13.1) | 43.6 (6.4) | 32.9 (0.5) | 54.0 (12.2) |
| Mean daily minimum °F (°C) | 18.3 (−7.6) | 22.6 (−5.2) | 32.4 (0.2) | 42.9 (6.1) | 54.0 (12.2) | 63.4 (17.4) | 67.1 (19.5) | 64.8 (18.2) | 55.9 (13.3) | 43.7 (6.5) | 33.1 (0.6) | 23.4 (−4.8) | 43.5 (6.4) |
| Mean minimum °F (°C) | −1.8 (−18.8) | 3.6 (−15.8) | 14.4 (−9.8) | 28.0 (−2.2) | 39.3 (4.1) | 51.2 (10.7) | 57.2 (14.0) | 55.2 (12.9) | 41.1 (5.1) | 29.0 (−1.7) | 16.2 (−8.8) | 5.7 (−14.6) | −5.9 (−21.1) |
| Record low °F (°C) | −24 (−31) | −21 (−29) | −17 (−27) | 18 (−8) | 29 (−2) | 42 (6) | 48 (9) | 43 (6) | 31 (−1) | 22 (−6) | −5 (−21) | −22 (−30) | −24 (−31) |
| Average precipitation inches (mm) | 1.98 (50) | 2.10 (53) | 2.93 (74) | 4.41 (112) | 4.87 (124) | 4.64 (118) | 4.39 (112) | 4.03 (102) | 4.10 (104) | 3.45 (88) | 2.70 (69) | 1.88 (48) | 41.48 (1,054) |
| Average snowfall inches (cm) | 2.9 (7.4) | 3.7 (9.4) | 0.7 (1.8) | 0.1 (0.25) | 0.0 (0.0) | 0.0 (0.0) | 0.0 (0.0) | 0.0 (0.0) | 0.0 (0.0) | 0.0 (0.0) | 0.5 (1.3) | 2.4 (6.1) | 10.3 (26) |
| Average precipitation days (≥ 0.01 in) | 7.3 | 7.2 | 9.1 | 11.1 | 12.4 | 10.3 | 9.0 | 8.6 | 8.0 | 9.0 | 7.6 | 7.3 | 106.9 |
| Average snowy days (≥ 0.1 in) | 1.5 | 2.0 | 0.5 | 0.1 | 0.0 | 0.0 | 0.0 | 0.0 | 0.0 | 0.0 | 0.4 | 1.3 | 5.8 |
Source: NOAA

== Demographics ==
Historical population
| Census | Pop. | Note | %± |
|---|---|---|---|
| 1870 | 227 | | — |
| 1880 | 250 | | 10.1% |
| 1890 | 132 | | −47.2% |
| 1900 | 1,156 | | 775.8% |
| 1910 | 794 | | −31.3% |
| 1920 | 848 | | 6.8% |
| 1930 | 1,210 | | 42.7% |
| 1940 | 1,144 | | −5.5% |
| 1950 | 1,060 | | −7.3% |
| 1960 | 1,096 | | 3.4% |
| 1970 | 1,122 | | 2.4% |
| 1980 | 1,228 | | 9.4% |
| 1990 | 1,107 | | −9.9% |
| 2000 | 1,145 | | 3.4% |
| 2010 | 1,089 | | −4.9% |
| 2020 | 1,027 | | −5.7% |
U.S. Decennial Census

=== 2010 census ===
As of the census of 2010, there were 1,089 people, 496 households, and 292 families residing in the city. The population density was 818.8 inhabitants per square mile (316.1/km^{2}). There were 545 housing units at an average density of 409.8 units per square mile (158.2 units/km^{2}). The racial makeup of the city was 94.3% White, 1.6% African American, 1.3% Native American, 0.1% Asian, 0.1% Pacific Islander, 0.5% from other races, and 2.2% from two or more races. Hispanic or Latino of any race were 1.3% of the population.

There were 496 households, of which 28.8% had children under the age of 18 living with them, 44.8% were married couples living together, 8.9% had a female householder with no husband present, 5.2% had a male householder with no wife present, and 41.1% were non-families. 37.1% of all households were made up of individuals, and 18.7% had someone living alone who was 65 years of age or older. The average household size was 2.20 and the average family size was 2.86.

The median age in the city was 41.6 years. 21.6% of residents were under the age of 18; 6.9% were between the ages of 18 and 24; 25.8% were from 25 to 44; 24.7% were from 45 to 64; and 20.9% were 65 years of age or older. The gender makeup of the city was 47.0% male and 53.0% female.

=== 2000 census ===
As of the census of 2000, there were 1,147 people, 483 households, and 310 families residing in the city. The population density was 858.6 inhabitants per square mile (331.5/km^{2}). There were 517 housing units at an average density of 387.7 units per square mile (149.7 units/km^{2}). The racial makeup of the city was 96.68% White, 0.96% African American, 0.09% Native American, 0.35% Pacific Islander, 0.79% from other races, and 1.14% from two or more races. Hispanic or Latino of any race were 2.10% of the population.

There were 483 households, out of which 32.1% had children under the age of 18 living with them, 50.3% were married couples living together, 10.1% had a female householder with no husband present, and 35.8% were non-families. 32.7% of all households were made up of individuals, and 21.1% had someone living alone who was 65 years of age or older. The average household size was 2.32 and the average family size was 2.91.

In the city the population was spread out, with 25.5% under the age of 18, 5.5% from 18 to 24, 27.6% from 25 to 44, 20.1% from 45 to 64, and 21.3% who were 65 years of age or older. The median age was 38 years. For every 100 females, there were 82.6 males. For every 100 females age 18 and over, there were 83.0 males.

The median income for a household in the city was $30,757, and the median income for a family was $36,875. Males had a median income of $25,982 versus $18,919 for females. The per capita income for the city was $12,657. About 8.7% of families and 13.7% of the population were below the poverty line, including 15.0% of those under age 18 and 21.1% of those age 65 or over.

== Notable people ==
- Kit Carson, explorer, guide, frontiersman
- Sara Evans, country music singer

== Notable place ==
New Franklin is home to the University of Missouri Center for Agroforestry, which holds an annual chestnut roast in the area.
