= Greenwood (Fayette, Missouri) =

Historic house in Missouri, United States

- U.S. National Register of Historic Places
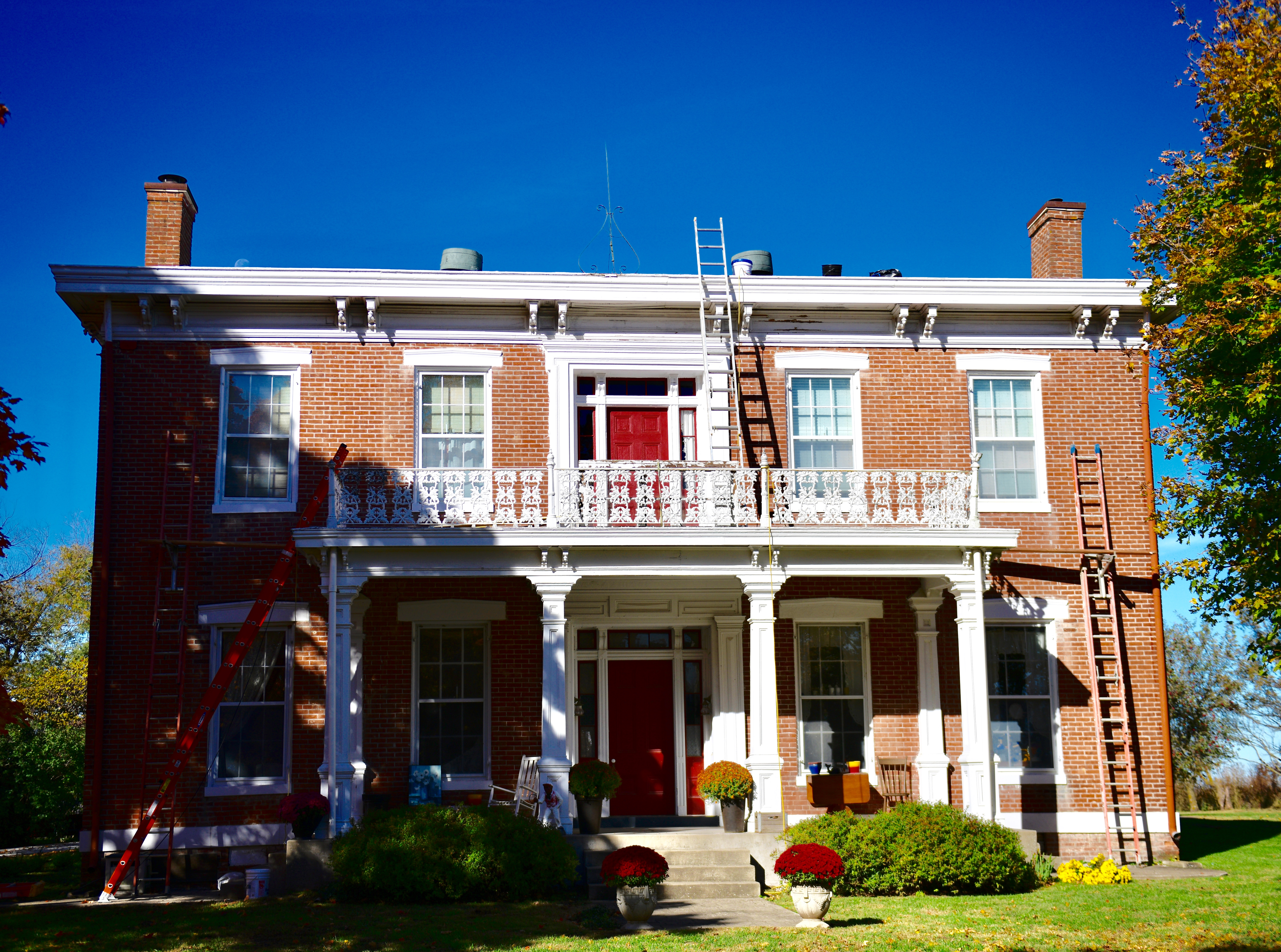

- Location within Missouri Location within the United States
- Location: MO 5, near Fayette, Missouri
- Coordinates: 39°3′49″N 92°45′4″W
- Area: 1 acre (0.40 ha)
- Built: 1864
- Built by: Megraw, Joseph
- Architectural style: Greek Revival
- NRHP reference No.: 83000994
- Added to NRHP: March 29, 1983

Greenwood, also known as the Estill-Parrish House, is a historic home located near Fayette, Howard County, Missouri, United States. It was built in 1864, and is a two-story, double pile, Greek Revival style brick dwelling with a two-story rear wing with an arcaded wooden gallery porch. It features fine interior woodwork. Also on the property are the contributing frame meat house, a single-cell slave house, a double-cell slave house, an ice house, and the White Hall School, a one-room frame school house built in 1860.

It was listed on the National Register of Historic Places in 1983.
