= South Main Street Historic District (Fayette, Missouri) =

Historic district in Missouri, United States

- U.S. National Register of Historic Places
- U.S. Historic district
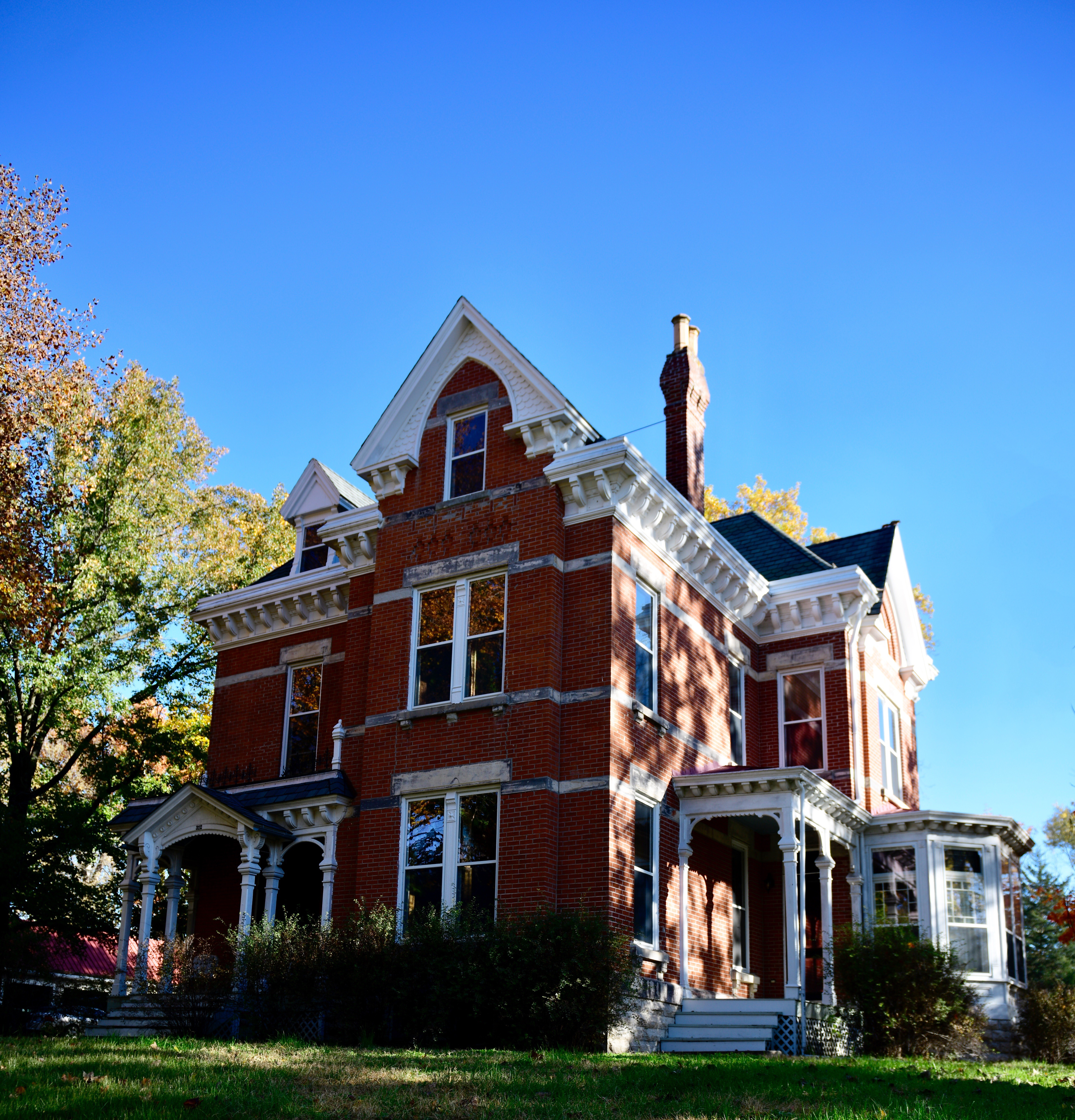
- Julius and Margaret Ferguson House (1884)

- Location within Missouri Location within the United States
- Location: 200,202,204 and 208-312 South Main St., Fayette, Missouri
- Coordinates: 38°08′37″N 93°40′50″W
- Area: 8.8 acres (3.6 ha)
- Architect: Megraw, Joseph; Megraw, William Joseph
- Architectural style: Queen Anne, Italianate
- NRHP reference No.: 99000083
- Added to NRHP: February 5, 1999

South Main Street Historic District is a national historic district located at Fayette, Howard County, Missouri, United States. The district encompasses 21 contributing buildings and 3 contributing structures in a predominantly residential section of Glasgow. It developed between about 1830 and 1935 and includes representative examples of Italianate and Queen Anne style architecture. Located in the district is the separately listed Edwin and Nora Payne Bedford House. Other notable buildings include the V. M Grigsby house (c. 1905), R. M. Moon house (c. 1923), Denneny sisters house (c. 1923), Joseph Shepard house / Joseph Davis house (c. 1828), Joseph Howard house (c. 1907), Thomas Howard house (1901), J. D. Tolson house (c. 1878), and the Robert Wilhoit house (c. 1935).

It was listed on the National Register of Historic Places in 1999.
