= Edwin and Nora Payne Bedford House =

Historic house in Missouri, United States

- U.S. National Register of Historic Places
- U.S. Historic district – Contributing property
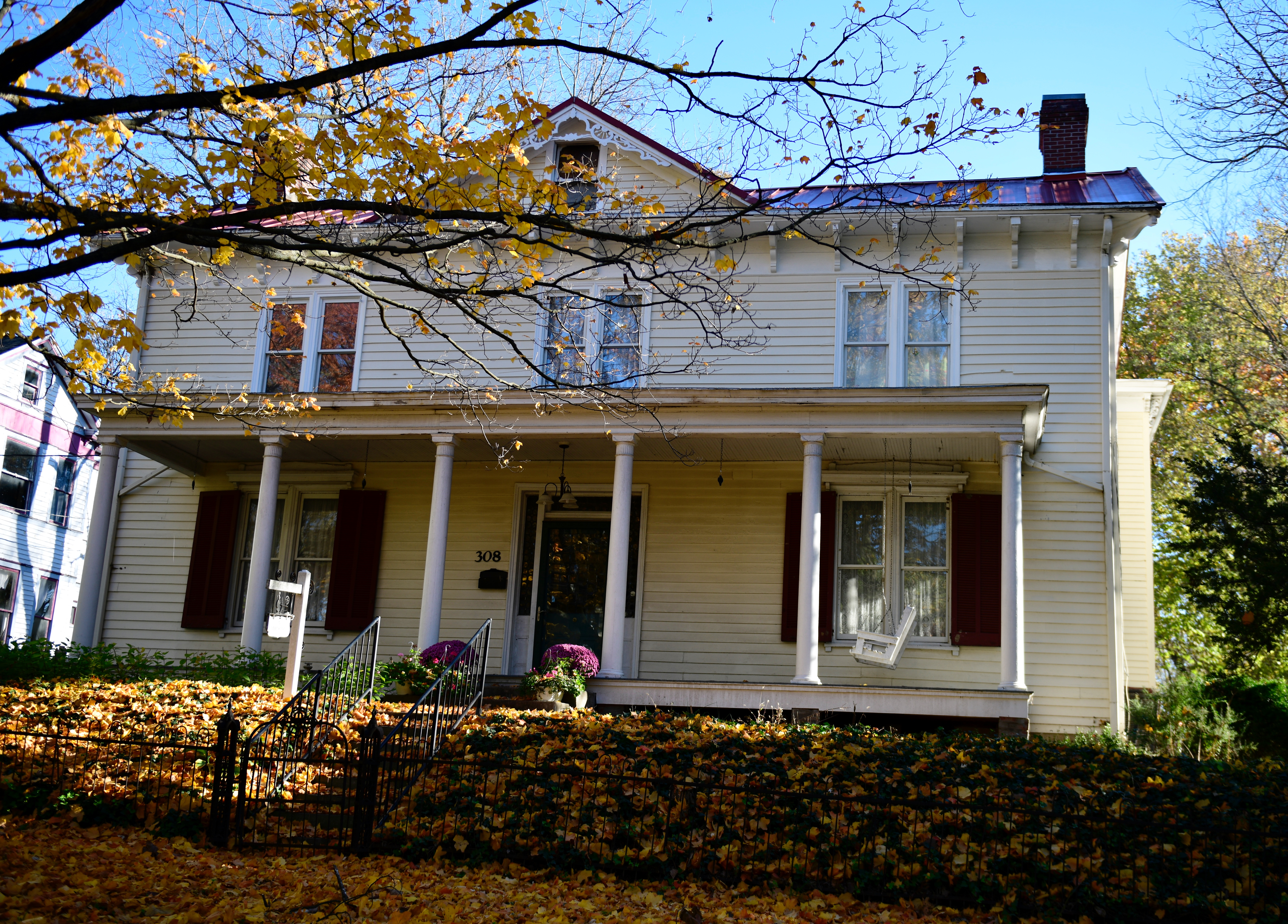

- Location within Missouri Location within the United States
- Location: 308 S. Main St. Fayette, Missouri
- Coordinates: 39.14405°N 92.680791°W
- Area: less than one acre
- Built: c. 1860
- Architectural style: I-house
- NRHP reference No.: 97001666
- Added to NRHP: January 23, 1998

Edwin and Nora Payne Bedford House, also known as the Thomas Payne House and Benjamin Smith House, is a historic home located at Fayette, Howard County, Missouri, United States. It was built about 1860, and is a two-story, three-bay, brick I-house with a two-story rear ell. It features a wide front porch and two level porch along the side of the rear ell. The interior of the house is distinguished by a large amount of ornamental woodwork.

It was listed on the National Register of Historic Places in 1998. It is located in the South Main Street Historic District.
