= Fayette City Park Swimming Pool =

- U.S. National Register of Historic Places
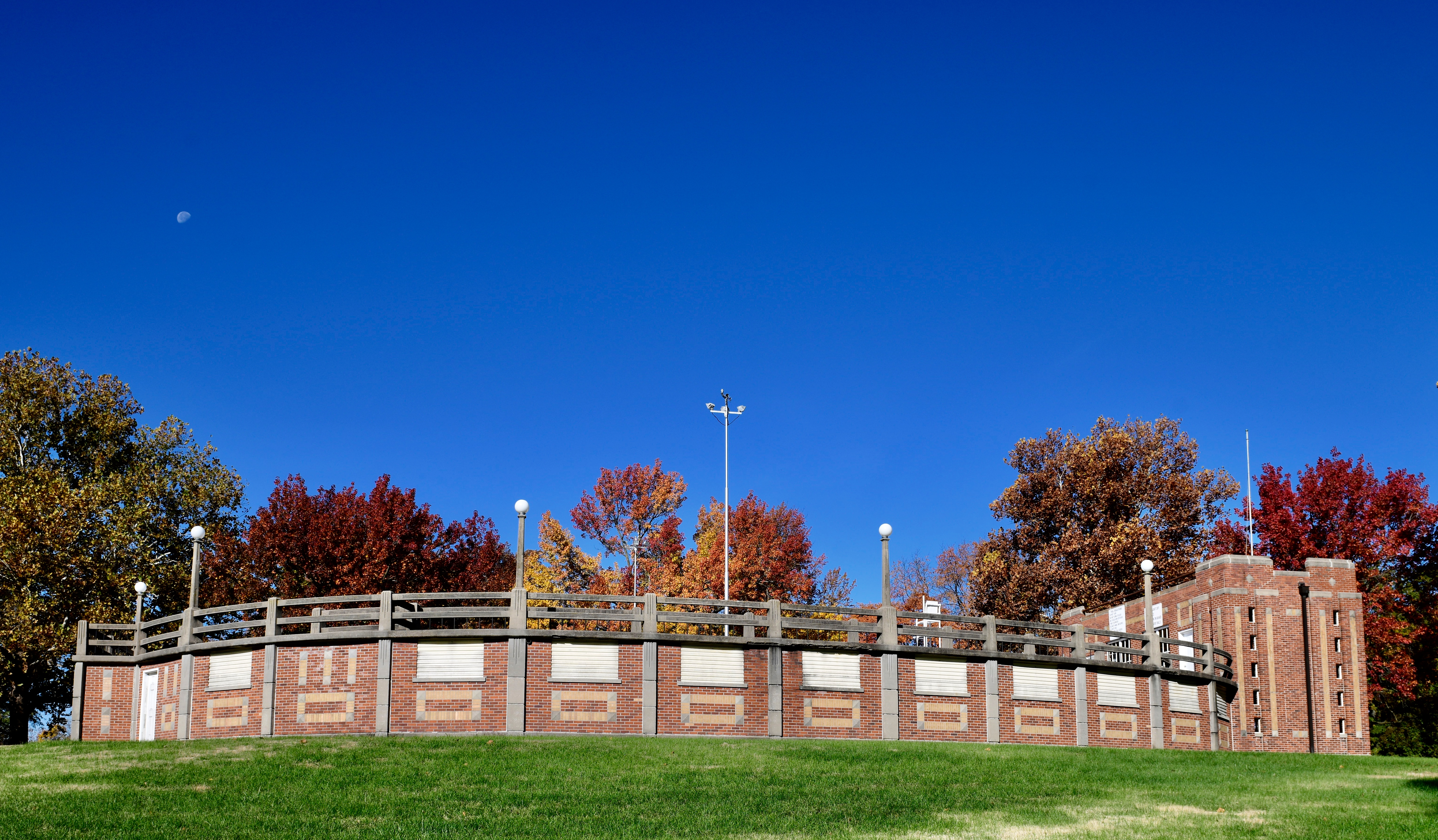

- Location within Missouri Location within the United States
- Location: Memorial Park; Fayette, Missouri
- Coordinates: 39°9′7″N 92°41′42″W
- Area: less than one acre
- Built: 1936
- Architect: Bintz, Wesley; Sheets, M.A.
- Architectural style: Art Deco
- NRHP reference No.: 99000457
- Added to NRHP: April 15, 1999

Fayette City Park Swimming Pool, also known as the Fayette WPA Pool and WWI Memorial, is a historic swimming pool located at Fayette, Howard County, Missouri. It was built in 1936 as a Works Progress Administration funded project. The pool building is a roughly egg shaped, one-story Art Deco structure with a rectangular two-story entrance hall on the north. The building has two-toned brick walls and a concrete foundation.

It was listed on the National Register of Historic Places in 1999.

The Fayette City Park Swimming Pool is one of several above-ground swimming pools designed by architect Wesley Bintz between 1919 and the 1950s. Headquartered in Lansing, Michigan, Bintz patented his iconic "Bintz Pool," which boasted efficiency and cost-effectiveness through the use of the "ovoid" shape and the above-ground design. While there were once about 135 "Bintz" swimming pools throughout the United States, today there are approximately 16 still standing, with even fewer still operating as swimming pools.
