= Fayette, Missouri =

City of Fayette, Missouri
- City
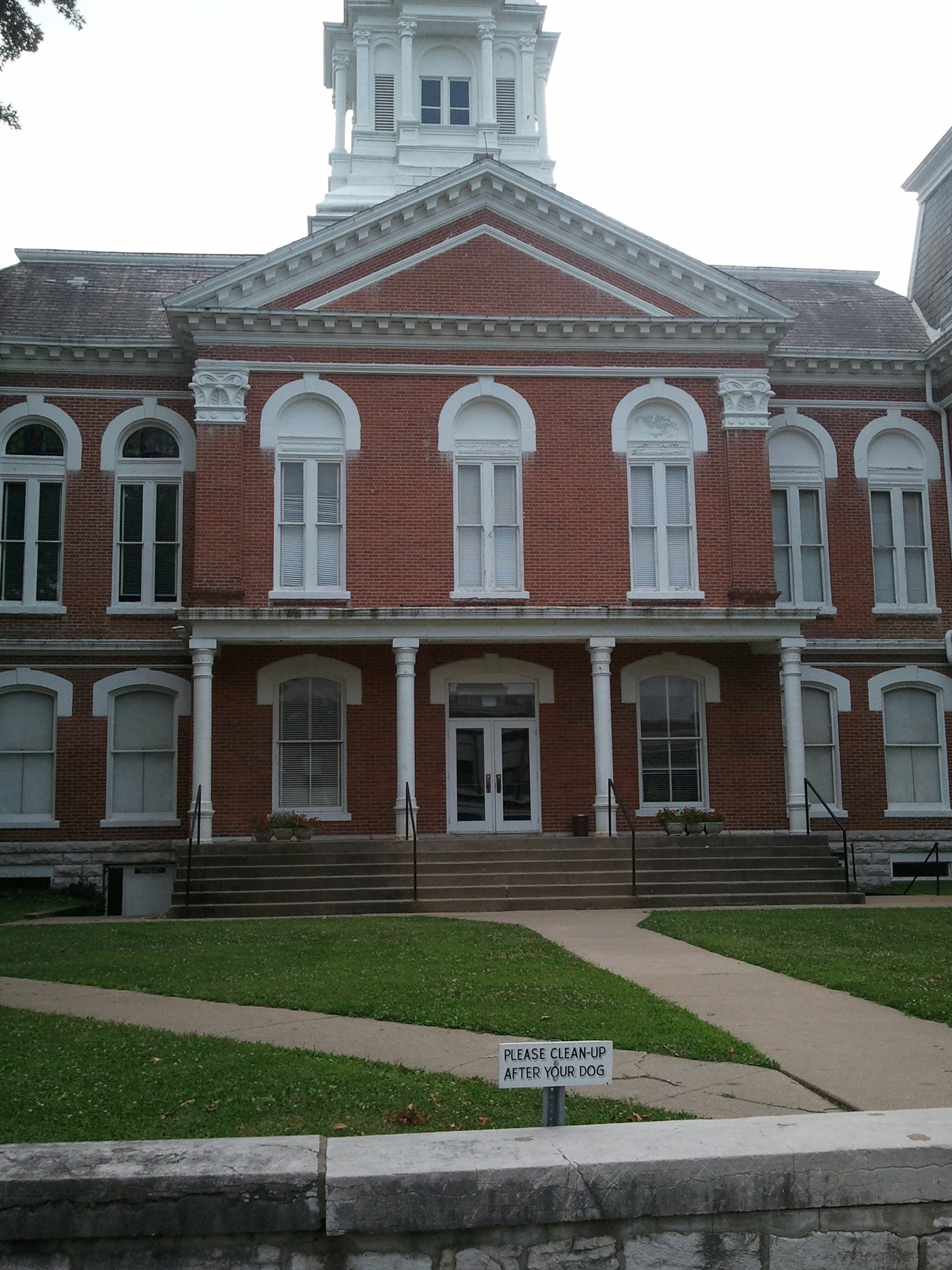
- Town Square in Fayette

- Location in the state of Missouri
- Coordinates: 39°8′44″N 92°41′10″W
- Country: United States
- State: Missouri
- County: Howard
- Founded: 1823

Government
  - Mayor: Greg Stidham
  - Administrator: Robin Triplett

Area
  - Total: 2.25 sq mi (5.84 km^{2})
  - Land: 2.22 sq mi (5.74 km^{2})
  - Water: 0.035 sq mi (0.09 km^{2})
- Elevation: 699 ft (213 m)

Population (2020)
  - Total: 2,803
  - Estimate (2023): 2,733
  - Density: 1,264.0/sq mi (488.05/km^{2})
- Time zone: UTC-6 (CST)
  - Summer (DST): UTC-5 (CDT)
- ZIP code: 65248
- Area code: 660
- FIPS code: 29-23842
- GNIS feature ID: 0717869
- Website: cityoffayettemo.com

Fayette (/ˈfeɪɛt/ FAY-et) is a city in and the county seat of Howard County, Missouri, United States. It is part of the Columbia, Missouri Metropolitan Area. The city's population was 2,803 at the 2020 census.

== History ==
Fayette was laid out in 1823. The community was named after Gilbert du Motier, Marquis de Lafayette. A post office has been in operation at Fayette since 1824.

The Edwin and Nora Payne Bedford House, Central Methodist College Campus Historic District, Coleman Hall, Fayette City Park Swimming Pool, Fayette Courthouse Square Historic District, Fayette Residential Historic District, Greenwood, Prior Jackson Homeplace, Alfred W. Morrison House, Oakwood, St. Mary's Episcopal Church, South Main Street Historic District, and Dr. Uriel S. Wright Office are listed on the National Register of Historic Places.

In 1899, a 19-year-old African American man was falsely accused of assaulting a 14-year-old White girl named Willie Dougherty, daughter of Wood Dougherty. The young man, Frank Embree, was stripped completely naked and whipped in front of a crowd of almost 2,000 witnesses. He took 100 lashes from horse whips before he ever cried out, refusing to admit he had done anything wrong. Ultimately, he could no longer endure the pain, and he gave a false confession to end his torture. He never begged for his life, but asked to be killed swiftly. The crowd was led by Mr. Dougherty and they eventually hung the 19 year old. There are numerous photos of this event and no one was ever convicted of the crime of lynching Embree.

== Geography ==
Fayette is at 39°8′44″N 92°41′10″W (39.145468, -92.686126). According to the United States Census Bureau, the city has a total area of 2.26 square miles (5.85 km^{2}), of which 2.22 square miles (5.75 km^{2}) is land and 0.04 square miles (0.10 km^{2}) is water.

== Demographics ==
Historical population
Census	Pop.	Note	%±
1860	647		—
1870	815		26.0%
1880	1,247		53.0%
1890	2,247		80.2%
1900	2,717		20.9%
1910	2,586		−4.8%
1920	2,381		−7.9%
1930	2,630		10.5%
1940	2,608		−0.8%
1950	3,144		20.6%
1960	3,294		4.8%
1970	3,520		6.9%
1980	2,983		−15.3%
1990	2,888		−3.2%
2000	2,793		−3.3%
2010	2,688		−3.8%
2020	2,803		4.3%
U.S. Decennial Census

=== 2020 census ===
As of the 2020 census, Fayette had a population of 2,803. The median age was 24.2 years. 17.6% of residents were under the age of 18 and 11.9% of residents were 65 years of age or older. For every 100 females there were 95.1 males, and for every 100 females age 18 and over there were 90.2 males age 18 and over.

0.0% of residents lived in urban areas, while 100.0% lived in rural areas.

There were 915 households in Fayette, of which 28.9% had children under the age of 18 living in them. Of all households, 33.2% were married-couple households, 21.7% were households with a male householder and no spouse or partner present, and 35.6% were households with a female householder and no spouse or partner present. About 34.6% of all households were made up of individuals and 13.7% had someone living alone who was 65 years of age or older.

There were 1,070 housing units, of which 14.5% were vacant. The homeowner vacancy rate was 3.6% and the rental vacancy rate was 9.9%.

Racial composition as of the 2020 census
Race	Number	Percent
White	2,150	76.7%
Black or African American	376	13.4%
American Indian and Alaska Native	15	0.5%
Asian	16	0.6%
Native Hawaiian and Other Pacific Islander	1	0.0%
Some other race	67	2.4%
Two or more races	178	6.4%
Hispanic or Latino (of any race)	135	4.8%

=== 2010 census ===
As of the census of 2010, there were 2,688 people, 949 households, and 509 families living in the city. The population density was 1,210.8 inhabitants per square mile (467.5/km^{2}). There were 1,097 housing units at an average density of 494.1 per square mile (190.8/km^{2}). The racial makeup of the city was 83.5% White, 13.0% African American, 0.3% Native American, 0.5% Asian, 0.1% Pacific Islander, 0.6% from other races, and 2.1% from two or more races. Hispanic or Latino of any race were 2.2% of the population.

There were 949 households, of which 25.7% had children under the age of 18 living with them, 36.9% were married couples living together, 12.6% had a female householder with no husband present, 4.1% had a male householder with no wife present, and 46.4% were non-families. 37.0% of all households were made up of individuals, and 17.5% had someone living alone who was 65 years of age or older. The average household size was 2.17 and the average family size was 2.85.

The median age in the city was 26.1 years. 16.7% of residents were under the age of 18; 32% were between the ages of 18 and 24; 15.9% were from 25 to 44; 19.5% were from 45 to 64; and 15.8% were 65 years of age or older. The gender makeup of the city was 48.7% male and 51.3% female.

=== 2000 census ===
As of the census of 2000, there were 2,793 people, 976 households, and 578 families living in the city. The population density was 1,253.6 inhabitants per square mile (484.0/km^{2}). There were 1,133 housing units at an average density of 508.5 per square mile (196.3/km^{2}). The racial makeup of the city was 79.16% White, 18.33% African American, 0.47% Native American, 0.21% Asian, 0.04% Pacific Islander, 0.47% from other races, and 1.32% from two or more races. Hispanic or Latino of any race were 0.93% of the population.

There were 976 households, out of which 25.0% had children under the age of 18 living with them, 41.4% were married couples living together, 14.5% had a female householder with no husband present, and 40.7% were non-families. 34.5% of all households were individuals, and 16.5% had someone living alone who was 65 years of age or older. The average household size was 2.18 and the average family size was 2.79.

In the city, the population was spread out, with 17.9% under the age of 18, 28.2% from 18 to 24, 19.5% from 25 to 44, 16.2% from 45 to 64, and 18.1% who were 65 years of age or older. The median age was 29 years. For every 100 females, there were 91.0 males. For every 100 females age 18 and over, there were 89.3 males.

The median income for a household in the city was $27,276, and the median income for a family was $35,694. Males had a median income of $27,768 versus $20,833 for females. The per capita income for the city was $13,451. About 9.1% of families and 15.6% of the population were below the poverty line, including 18.1% of those under age 18 and 20.0% of those age 65 or over.

== Education ==
Fayette is home to Central Methodist University, a private university affiliated with the United Methodist Church. It was also home to the now-defunct Howard-Payne Junior College.

In its public school system, Fayette has one elementary school (L. J. Daly), one middle school (W. N. Clark), and one high school (Fayette).

Fayette has a lending library, the Howard County Public Library.

== Notable people ==
- Carrie Carlton (1834–1868), poet, writer, journalist
- Daniel Leeper Mumpower (1882–1969), medical missionary and physician
