= History of Columbia, Missouri =

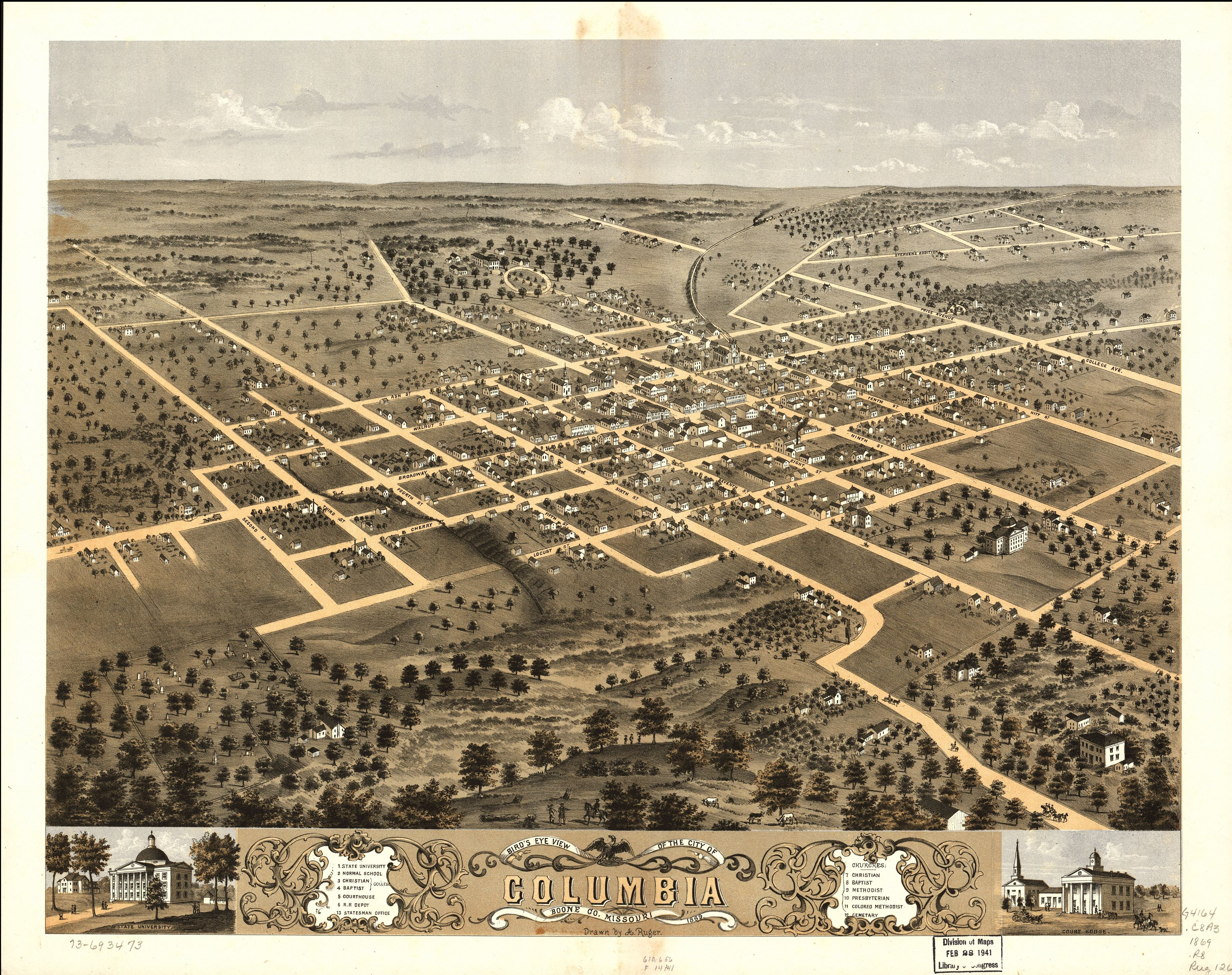
Columbia's downtown district in 1869. The large building on the right is University of Missouri Academic Hall.

The history of Columbia, Missouri as an American city spans two hundred years. Founded by pioneers from Kentucky in 1821 to be the county seat of Boone County, its position astride the Boone's Lick Road led to early growth as settlers flooded into the Boonslick and eventually the West. In the 21st century Columbia is Missouri's fourth largest city and educational center.

== Prehistory and colonial period ==
The Columbia area was once part of the Mississippian culture and home to the Mound Builders. When European explorers arrived the area was populated by the Osage and Missouri Native Americans. In 1678 La Salle claimed all of Missouri for France. The Lewis and Clark Expedition passed by the area on the Missouri River in 1803.

== City founding ==
Columbia's origins begin with the settlement of American pioneers from Kentucky and Virginia in an early 1800s region known as the Boonslick. Before 1815 settlement in the region was confined to small log forts because of the threat of Native American attack during the War of 1812. When the war ended settlers came on foot, horseback, and wagon, often moving entire households along the Boone's Lick Road and sometimes bringing enslaved African Americans. By 1818 it was clear that the increased population would necessitate a new county be created from territorial Howard County. The Mouniteau Creek on the west and Cedar Creek on the east were obvious natural boundaries.

Believing it was only a matter of time before a county seat was chosen, the Smithton Land Company was formed to purchase over 2,000 acres (8.1 km^{2}) to established the village of Smithton near the present-day intersection of Walnut and Garth. In 1819 Smithton was a small cluster of log cabins in an ancient forest of oak and hickory; chief among them was the cabin of Richard Gentry, a trustee of the Smithton Company who would become first mayor of Columbia. In 1820 Boone County was formed and named after the recently deceased explorer Daniel Boone. The Missouri Legislature appointed John Gray, Jefferson Fulcher, Absalom Hicks, Lawrence Bass, and David Jackson as commissioners to select and establish a permanent county seat. Smithton never had more than twenty people, and it was quickly realized that well digging was difficult because of the bedrock.

Springs were discovered across the Flat Branch Creek, so in the Spring of 1821 Columbia was laid off and the inhabitants of Smithton moved their cabins to the new town. The first house in Columbia was built by Thomas Duly in 1820 at what would become Fifth and Broadway. They renamed the settlement Columbia—a historical name for the United States. Columbia's permanence was ensured when it was chosen as county seat in 1821 and the Boone's Lick Road was rerouted down Broadway.

== Expansion and growth ==
The roots of Columbia's three economic foundations—education, medicine, and insurance—can be traced back almost to incorporation in 1821. Original plans for the town set aside land for a state university. Columbia College (distinct from today's), later to become the University of Missouri, was founded in 1839. When the state legislature decided to establish a state university, Columbia raised three times as much money as any other competing city and donated the land that is today the Francis Quadrangle. Stephens College had opened six years earlier in 1833 as the Columbia Female Academy. Soon other educational institutions were founded in Columbia such as Christian Female College, which later became the current Columbia College. The city benefited from being a stagecoach stop of the Santa Fe and Oregon trails, and later from the Missouri-Kansas-Texas Railroad. In 1822 the first hospital was set up by William Jewell. In 1830 the first newspaper was begun; in 1832 the first theater in the state was opened; the first movie was screened in the Haden Opera House; and in 1835 the states first agricultural fair was held. By 1839 the population (13,000) and wealth of Boone County was exceeded in Missouri only by that of St. Louis County.

== Civil War and Reconstruction ==
Columbia's infrastructure was largely untouched by the Civil War, although several major battles occurred nearby at Boonville and Centralia. The town was heavily garrisoned by Union troops, and though the city was pro-union the surrounding areas of Boone County and the rest of central Missouri was decidedly pro-south. During reconstruction the town saw steady growth in size, and continued to expand in all directions.

== 20th century ==
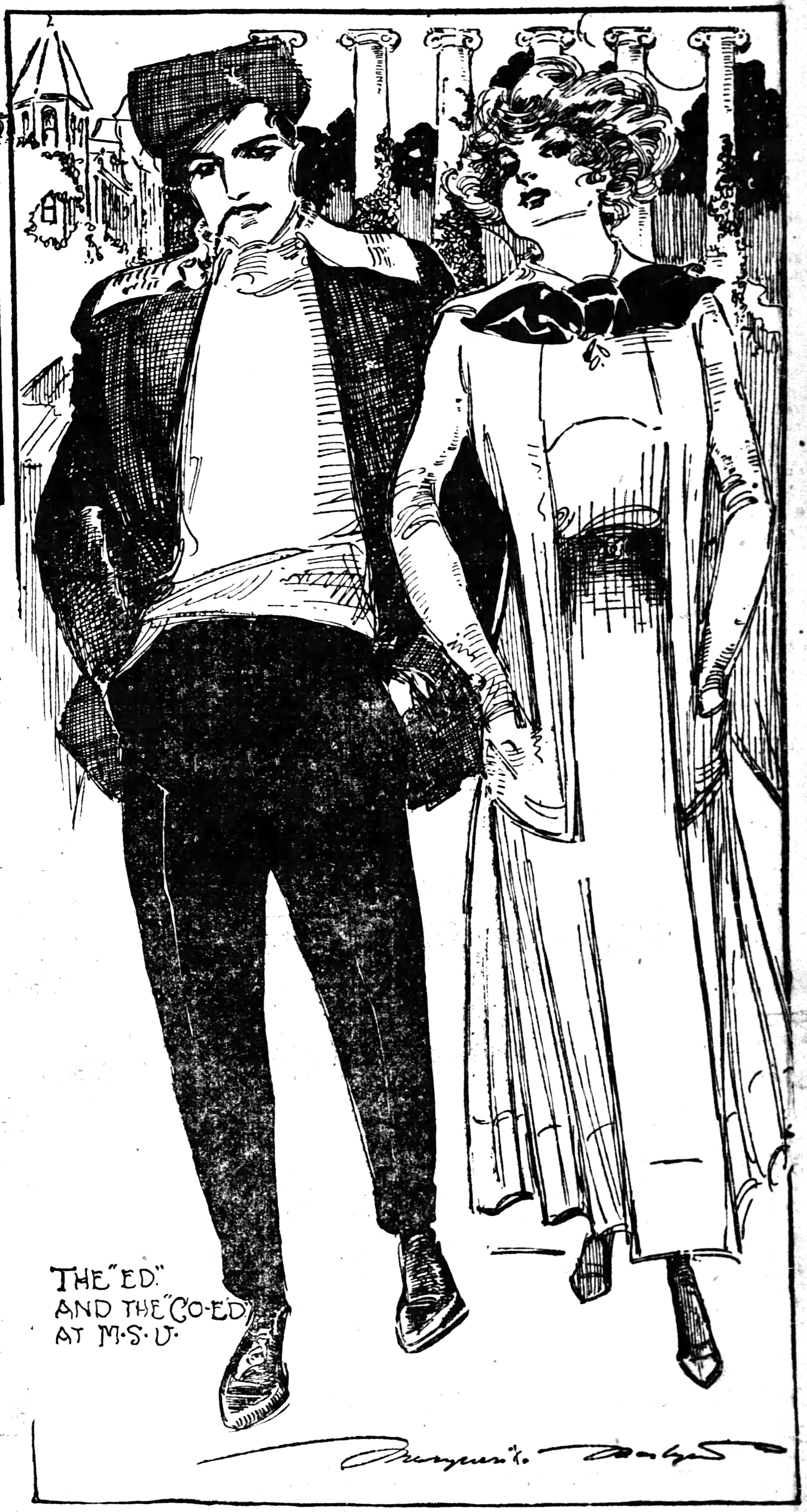
Journalist Marguerite Martyn visited the state university campus in 1910 and sketched these two fashionable students. At that time, the campus was known as Missouri State University.

The 20th century saw Columbia's prominence as an educational center rise even further. It became home to the headquarters of the University of Missouri System, Stephens College and Columbia College. It became a transportation crossroads when U.S. Routes 63 and 40, the latter of which is concurrent with present-day Interstate 70, were routed through the city. Soon after, the city opened the Columbia Regional Airport. During this time, two insurance companies established their own headquarters in Columbia: Shelter Insurance and State Farm. The latter 20th century saw tremendous growth and by the end of the century, the population was over 80,000 in the city proper.

== Recent developments ==
In the early 2000s Columbia embarked on a plan to manage the continued growth. The city is today growing especially towards the Missouri River in southwest Boone County. The downtown district has maintained its status as a cultural center and is undergoing significant development in both residential and commercial sectors. The University of Missouri, which experienced record enrollment in 2006, is undertaking significant construction.

== See also ==
- History of the University of Missouri
- Boone County Historical Society
- List of cemeteries in Boone County, Missouri
