= Flat Branch =

Flat Branch may refer to:

- Flat Branch (Hinkson Creek tributary), a stream in Columbia, Missouri
- Flat Branch Park, a park in Columbia, Missouri
- Flat Branch, North Carolina, an unincorporated community in Anderson Creek Township
- Flat Branch (Fisher River tributary) in Surry County, North Carolina
- Flat Branch (Hyco River tributary) in Halifax County, Virginia
