= Smithton Company =

Coordinates: 38°57′10.06″N 92°20′19.39″W

The Smithton Land Company was a group of American pioneers who in 1818 established the frontier village of Smithton, Missouri in the Boonslick region of Missouri, then the Missouri Territory. In 1821 the settlement was renamed Columbia, Missouri and relocated slightly East of its original location. Smithton was the first county seat of Boone County. The company and town were named after Thomas Adams Smith, the receiver of the land office in Franklin, Missouri.

Smithton’s origin begins with the settlement of American pioneers from Kentucky and Virginia in an early 1800s region known as the Boonslick. Before 1815 settlement in the region was confined to small log forts because of the threat of Native American attack during the War of 1812. When the war ended settlers came on foot, horseback, and wagon, often moving entire households along the Boone's Lick Road and often bringing enslaved African Americans. By 1818 it was clear that the increased population would necessitate a new county be created from territorial Howard County. The Mouniteau Creek on the west and Cedar Creek on the east were obvious natural boundaries.

Believing it was only a matter of time before a county seat was chosen, the Smithton Land Company was formed to purchase over 2,000 acres (8.1 km^{2}) to established the village of Smithton near the present-day intersection of Walnut and Garth. In 1819 Smithton was a small cluster of log cabins in an ancient forest of oak and hickory; chief among them was the cabin of Richard Gentry, a trustee of the Smithton Company who would become first mayor of Columbia. In 1820 Boone County was formed and named after the recently deceased explorer Daniel Boone. The Missouri Legislature appointed John Gray, Jefferson Fulcher, Absalom Hicks, Lawrence Bass, and David Jackson as commissioners to select and establish a permanent county seat. Smithton never had more than twenty people, and it was quickly realized that well digging was difficult because of the bedrock. Springs were discovered across the Flat Branch Creek, so in the Spring of 1821 Columbia was laid off and the inhabitants of Smithton moved their cabins to the new town. The first house in Columbia was built by Thomas Duly in 1820 at what would become Fifth and Broadway. They renamed the settlement Columbia—a historical name for the United States. Columbia's permanence was ensured when it was chosen as county seat in 1821 and the Boone's Lick Road was rerouted down Broadway.

== Smithton Company members ==
- Lilburn Boggs, sixth Governor of Missouri
- Richard Gentry, politician and military officer
- William Jewell, politician, physician, educator, minister

== Later commemoration ==
A mural in the Missouri State Capitol commemorates the first Circuit Court of Boone County in Smithton. There are also murals in the Boone County Courthose and Columbia Municipal Building. A historical marker at the site of Smithton was announced in 2018. There is a maker placed by the Daughters of the American Revolution commemorating Smithtons place on the Boone's Lick Road.

Smithton Middle School in Columbia is named after the village.
