= Boonslick =

Cultural region in the US state of Missouri

Coordinates: 39.083°N 92.667°W

The Boonslick, or Boone's Lick Country, is a cultural region of the state of Missouri along the Missouri River that played an important role in the westward expansion of the United States and the development of Missouri's territorial and subsequent statehood in the early 19th century. The Boone's Lick Road, is a longtime historic route paralleling the north bank of the Missouri River from southeast to northwest, between St. Charles and Franklin, Missouri. It was the primary thoroughfare for settlers moving westward from the major river port on the Mississippi River of St. Louis (founded by the French, 1764) and the first capital of the old federal Missouri Territory (1812–1821), in the early 19th century. St. Louis was also a major settlement town since the 17th and 18th century era along with the nearby, across the river upstream to the east, French colonial settlements Kaskaskia and Cahokia in the adjacent Illinois Country of the New France colonial empire of the old Kingdom of France, leading from its capital in Quebec (in future Canada) in the north, and east of the Great Lakes and extending southward through the central Mississippi River Valley down to the lower river port of New Orleans on the Gulf of Mexico and in French Louisiana, the heartland and central watershed of the North American continent. St. Louis was also important because of its proximity to the confluence of the central Mississippi with the Ohio River flowing from the northeast and the Missouri River streaming from the far western Rocky Mountains northwest in the earlier federal Louisiana Territory (1804–1812), organized after the sale of the huge uncharted Louisiana Purchase of 1803, from the Emperor Napoleon I / Napoleon Bonaparte of France (the First French Empire) for $15 million.

The western terminus of the Boone's Lick Road further west in Franklin also marked the eastern end and beginning of the continuing famous Santa Fe Trail, leading further southwestward across the Great Plains to Santa Fe, the Royal Spanish colonial capital of its province of New Mexico in the larger Viceroyalty of New Spain dominions of its Spanish Empire in the twin continents of the Americas (Western Hemisphere). This well-known historical trail, first explored in 1806–1807, by U.S. Army officer Zebulon Pike (1779–1813), and his military expedition eventually became a major conduit for continuing overland American-Spanish trade in the future Southwestern United States. Later it inter-connected with the other heavily used emigrant westward trails, including the Oregon and California Trails, used by pioneers, mountain men/fur trappers, gold-seekers and other early settlers of the American frontier West.

The region takes its name from the local historical landmark a salt spring or referred to as a "lick" (known today as Boone's Lick State Historic Site) in western Howard County, used by brothers Nathan Boone (1780–1856), and Daniel Morgan Boone (1769–1839), sons of famed Western explorer (in Kentucky), settler, and frontiersman Daniel Boone (1734–1820).

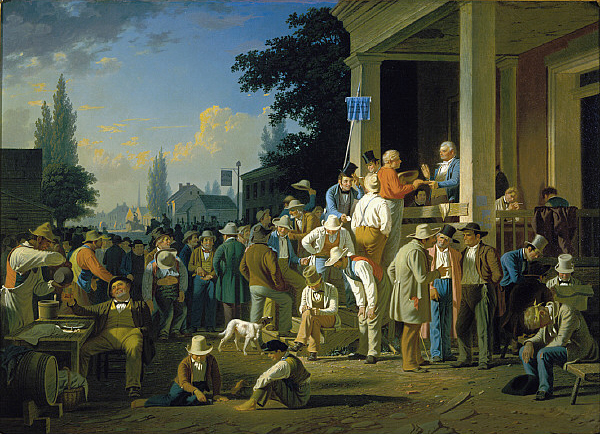
The County Election by Missouri artist George Caleb Bingham (1811–1879), portrays early political life of the American Western frontier in Missouri

Many of Missouri's early leaders came from the Boonslick region. Its early French and Spanish colonial vestiges in old Louisiana were overtaken by settlement of newer European-American migrants moving westward from the Original Thirteen States on the East Coast, down the Ohio River from the Ohio Country, Pittsburgh and the Upland South — largely new states of Kentucky and Tennessee with its connecting tributary rivers from the south of the Tennessee and Cumberland streams, and crossing in the gaps / passes of the Appalachian Mountains chain, from Virginia further east – who brought numerous African-American slaves with them. The region's borders often vary in definition but have included the present-day counties of Boone, Callaway, Cooper, Howard, and Saline. Before and after the American Civil War, the area developed as the center of a larger region known as Little Dixie.

Franklin, Missouri, founded in 1816, became a large port on the Missouri River and an early center of settlement and economic activity. There, the Boone's Lick Trail ended and William Becknell (c.1787/88-1856), blazed the Santa Fe Trail further to the southwest to the adjacent Spanish Empire's colonial territories in its province of New Mexico. The Chouteau brothers of St. Louis had previously established a fur trade monopoly with the Spanish in Santa Fe, and the fur trade was the basis of early St. Louis' prosperity and wealth, in addition to river-borne commerce.

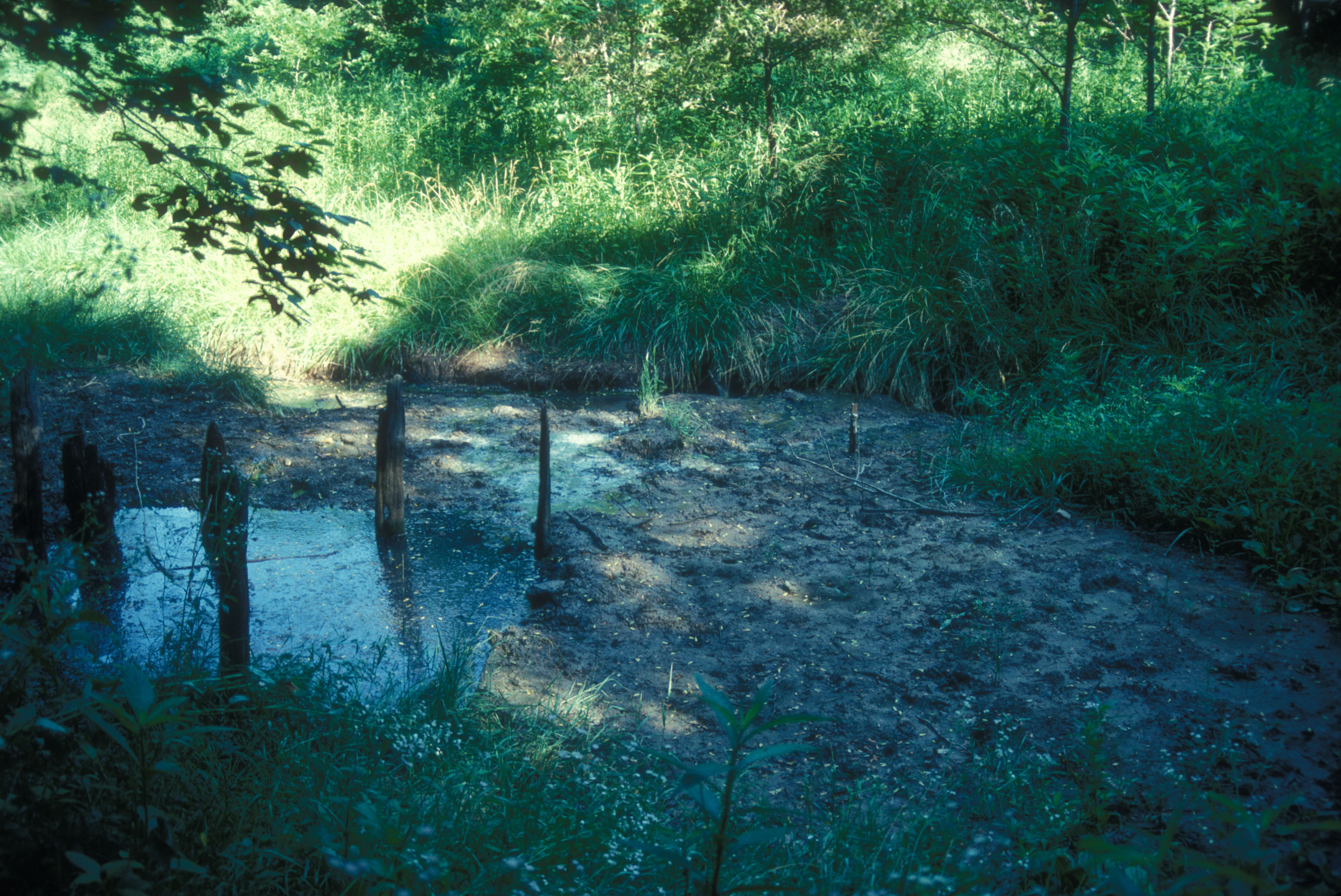
The salt spring known as Boone's Lick State Historic Site in western Howard County, Missouri

Columbia, Missouri is the largest city in the region and county seat of Boone County; it is the location of the flagship Columbia campus of the University of Missouri system, which was established in 1839. Famed artist George Caleb Bingham (1811–1879), painted in both Franklin and Columbia. His artworks illustrate Western American frontier pioneer, political and river life in the early and mid-19th century. Other early towns were Arrow Rock, Boonville, Fayette, and Rocheport.

In 1827, waterfront Franklin was lost to the powerful devastating floods of the river that year, and the town was re-built higher upon the flanking bluffs as renamed New Franklin. The Smithton Company established the village of Smithton, in the old Missouri Territory in 1818, which would later grow into and be renamed the city of Columbia in 1821.

In the current 21st century, the area is still predominantly rural, with the exception of the city of Columbia. The region is adjacent to the Missouri Rhineland and maintains its own developed vineyards. The Katy Trail State Park runs along the Missouri River, providing recreational access by a conversion of former railroad lines to trails for biking and walking / hiking.

== See also ==
- Great Osage Trail
- List of cemeteries in Boone County, Missouri
- National Register of Historic Places listings in Boone County, Missouri
- National Register of Historic Places listings in Howard County, Missouri
