= Columbia station =

Columbia station may refer to:

- Columbia Station (Washington), an Amtrak station in Wenatchee, Washington, United States
- Columbia station (South Carolina), an Amtrak station in Columbia, South Carolina, United States
- Columbia station (SkyTrain), a SkyTrain station in New Westminster, British Columbia, Canada
- Colombia (Madrid Metro), a Madrid Metro station in Madrid, Spain
- Columbia station (Missouri, Kansas, and Texas Railroad), a disused Missouri, Kansas, and Texas Railroad station in Columbus, Missouri, United States
- Columbia station, former name for Cecil B. Moore station, part of Philadelphia's SEPTA system in Pennsylvania, United States
- Columbia station, former name of JFK/UMass station in Boston, United States
- Columbia station (Wabash Railroad), a disused Wabash Railroad train station in Columbia, Missouri, United States
- Columbia Station, Ohio, a township in Lorain County, Ohio, United States
- Columbia Avenue station, former name for Temple University station, part of Philadelphia's SEPTA system in Pennsylvania, United States
- Columbia Generating Station, a nuclear energy facility in the USDE Hanford Site in Washington, United States
- 116th Street–Columbia University station, IRT subway station in New York City, United States
- Columbia City station, a light rail station in Seattle, Washington, United States
- Union Station (Columbia, South Carolina), a historic station in Columbia, South Carolina, United States
