= North Todd Gentry =

American judge (1866–1944)

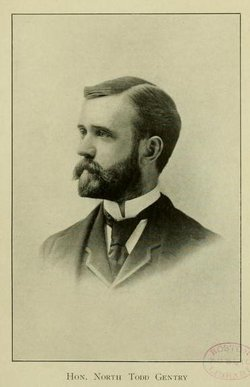

Missouri Attorney General
- In office 1925–1928
- Governor: Samuel Aaron Baker
- Preceded by: Robert William Otto
- Succeeded by: Stratton Shartel

North Todd Gentry (1866 – 1944) was a lawyer from Columbia, Missouri, who served as Missouri Attorney General and justice of the Supreme Court of Missouri. He had a lifelong law practice in Columbia and was president of the Boone County Bar. Considered an authority on local history, he was active in the Boone County Historical Society. He also held membership in the Boone County Hospital Association and the Kiwanis Club. Gentry was a Freemason, Republican, and Presbyterian.

Gentry was born on March 2, 1866, the son of Thomas Benton and Mary Todd (Note: Granddaughter of General Levi Todd who was also the grandfather of Mary Todd Lincoln.) Gentry. He was the grandson of Richard Gentry, the first mayor of Columbia, and Ann Hawkins Gentry. He graduated from the University of Missouri with a law degree in 1888. His papers are held at the State Historical Society of Missouri. He and his wife adopted a daughter who was orphaned in a railroad accident on the Columbia Terminal Railroad. He died at age 78 on September 18, 1944.

== Works ==
- The Bench and Bar of Boone County Columbia. E.W. Stephens Publishing Company (1916)
- The Writings of North Todd Gentry (published posthumously in 2011)

== Notes ==
Political offices
Preceded by Robert William Otto	Missouri Attorney General; 1925–1928	Succeeded by Stratton Shartel
Preceded by Ernest S. Gantt	Justice of the Missouri Supreme Court; 1928	Succeeded by William Francis Frank
