= Great Osage Trail =

Native American trail

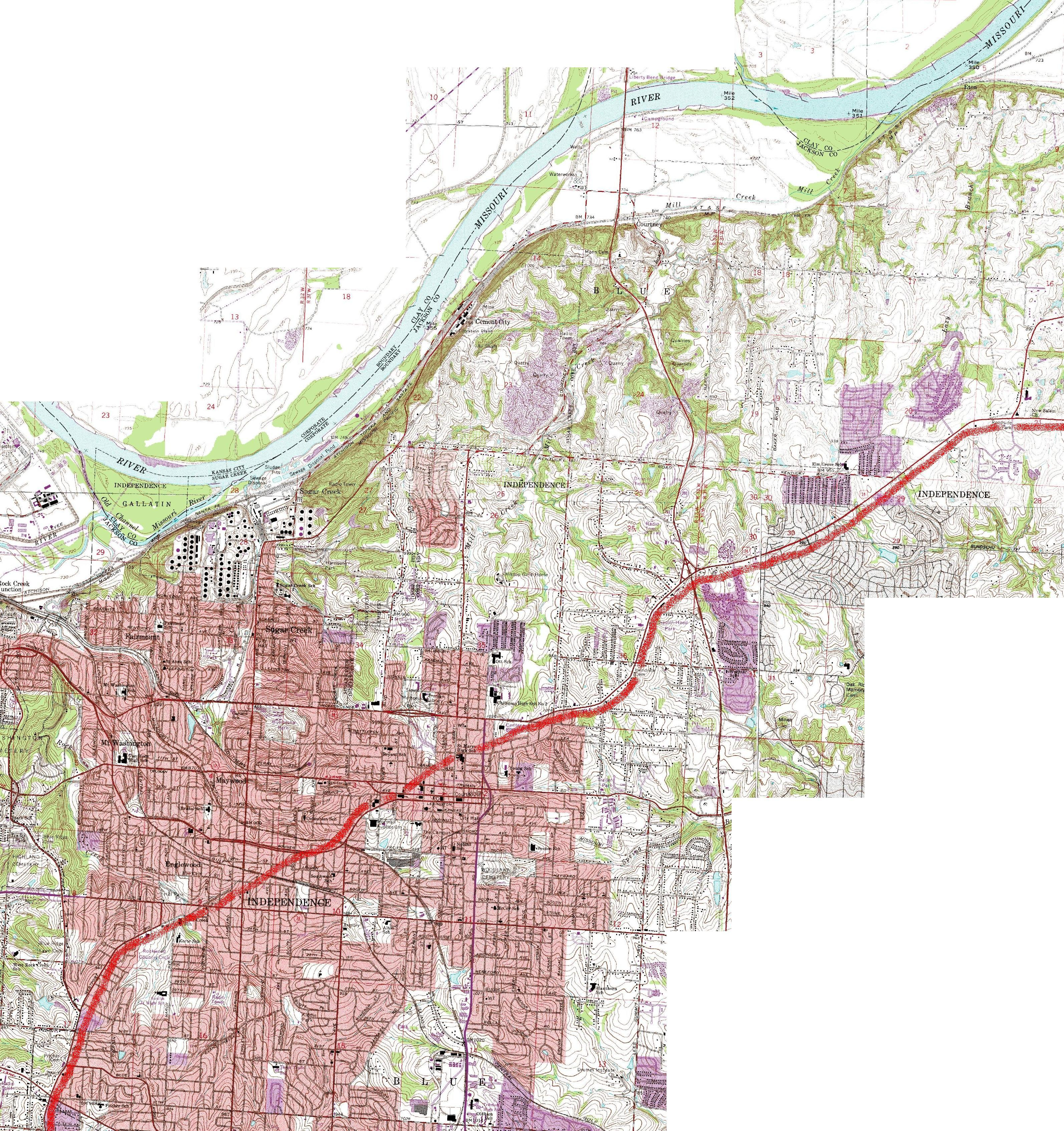
1980 U.S. Geological Survey Topographical map of a portion of Independence Missouri with a blurry red line superimposed, showing the route of the ancient "Great Osage Trail" which after 1825 was known as the first section of the Santa Fe Trail, destination New Mexico and Mexico.

The Great Osage Trail, also known as the Osage Trace or the Kaw Trace, was one of the more well-known Native American trails through the countryside of the Midwest and Plains States of the U.S., pathways blazed by herds of buffalo or other migrating wildlife (Medicine Trails).

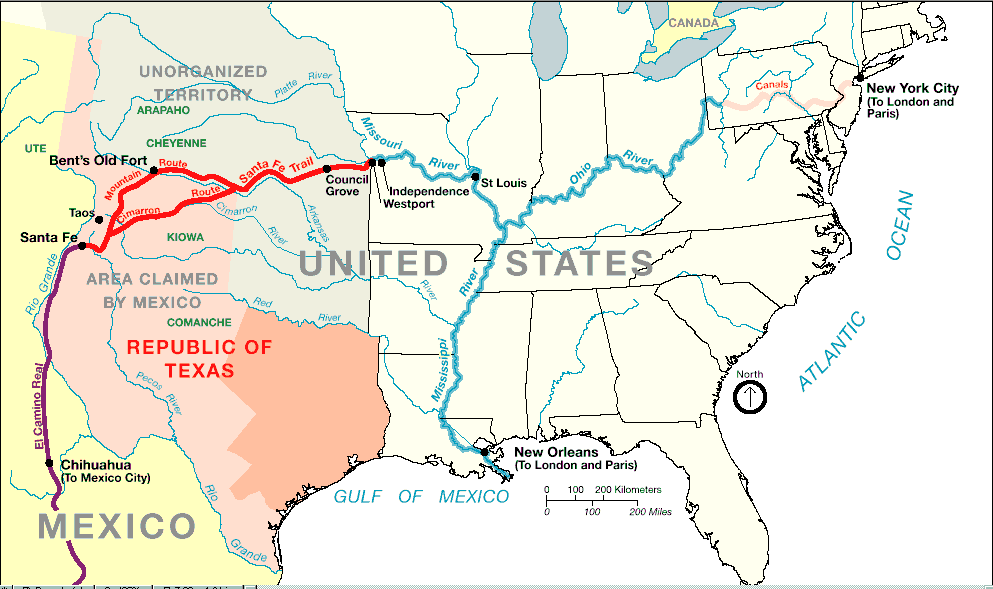
Map of most of the Santa Fe Trail in 1845. A more detailed map produced by the National Park Service shows the starting point in central Missouri, further east of the Kansas City Metropolitan Area than is shown in this map.

The Osage Indians and other tribes traveled among a variety of routes later named "Osage Trails" by European settlers; the famous Route 66 through southern Missouri Ozarks follows the route of one such "Osage Trail" and U.S. Route 24 through central Missouri follows the route (from Franklin, Missouri westward) of the "Great Osage Trail", which in 1825 became known as the first phase of the Santa Fe Trail, extending from central Missouri (near Franklin and Boonville, Missouri) westward shadowing the route of the Missouri River, then turning southwestward through Independence, Missouri, into Kansas, Colorado, Santa Fe, New Mexico, and "Old" Mexico. From an 1881 History of Jackson County, Missouri,

"The Santa Fe trade first began at Old Franklin, a little town on the Missouri River... and continued from this point till the year 1831, when it sprung up at Independence. The town of Independence being a hundred miles further west, and near the great bend of the Missouri River, it was thought to be a more favorable place for fitting out caravans for Mexico, since also the route could be made from Franklin to Independence much better by water than land. At Independence the bulk of the trade continued till about the years 1838-40, when it began at Westport, and subsequently at Westport Landing (now Kansas City)...."

== Haudenosaunee Tree of Peace and the Trail ==
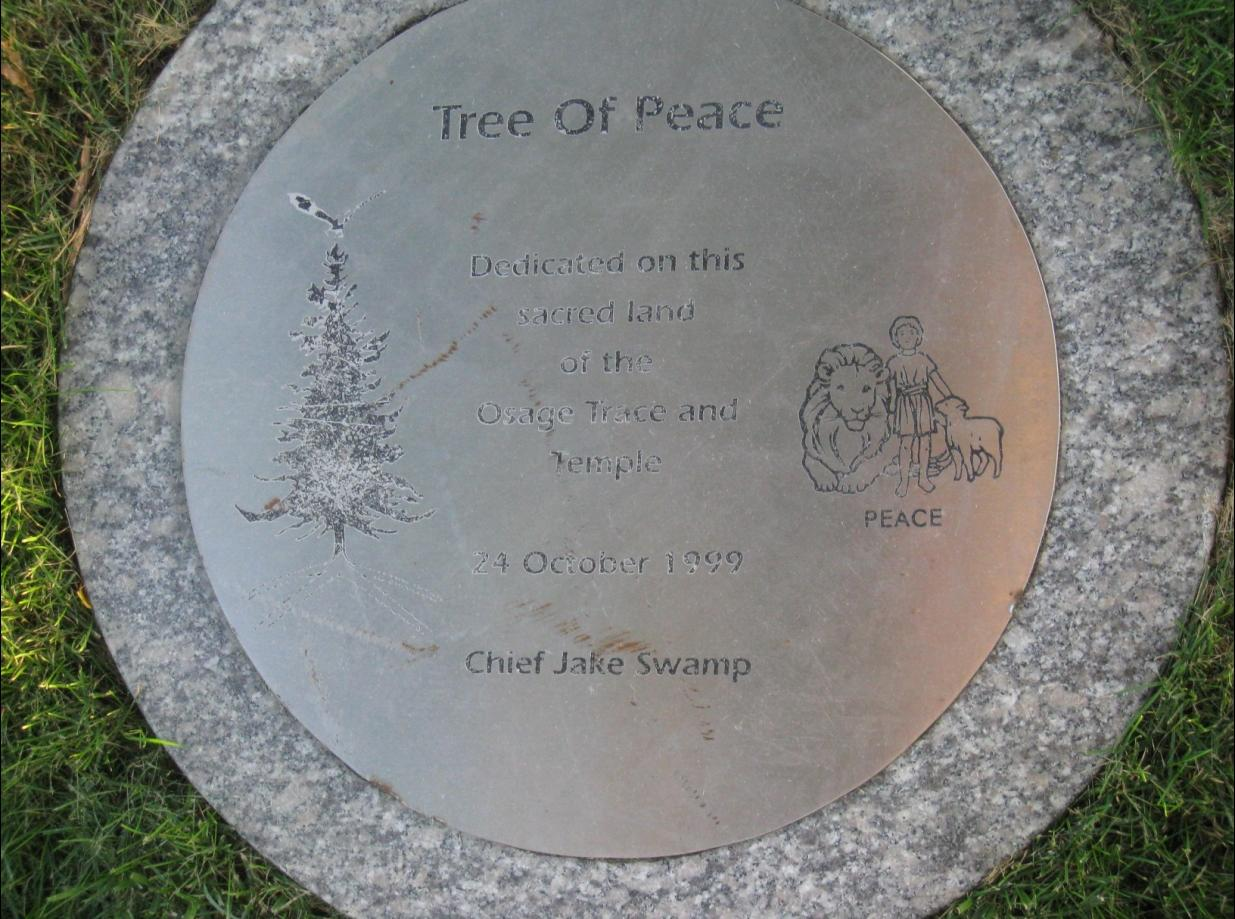
Commemorative marker near base of an oak tree planted on the property of the Independence Temple in 1999, a few dozen yards south of a stretch of The Great Osage Trail at Lexington Street/Avenue in Independence, Missouri.

On October 24, 1999, Haudenosaunee chieftain Jake Swamp oversaw a ceremonial planting of a Haudenosaunee "Tree of Peace" alongside the route of the Great Osage Trail, a few yards south of Lexington Street in Independence, Missouri, on the property of the Community of Christ's Independence Temple and on the site of the Latter-day Saint "Temple Site" property claimed and then purchased by Mormon leadership in 1831. A 1979 article in an LDS Church magazine discusses early Latter-day Saint travels along the Boone's Lick Road from St. Louis to Franklin in the central part of the state, then along the Great Osage Trail/Santa Fe Trail from Franklin to Missouri's western border.
