= Boone's Lick State Historic Site =

Historic site in Missouri, United States

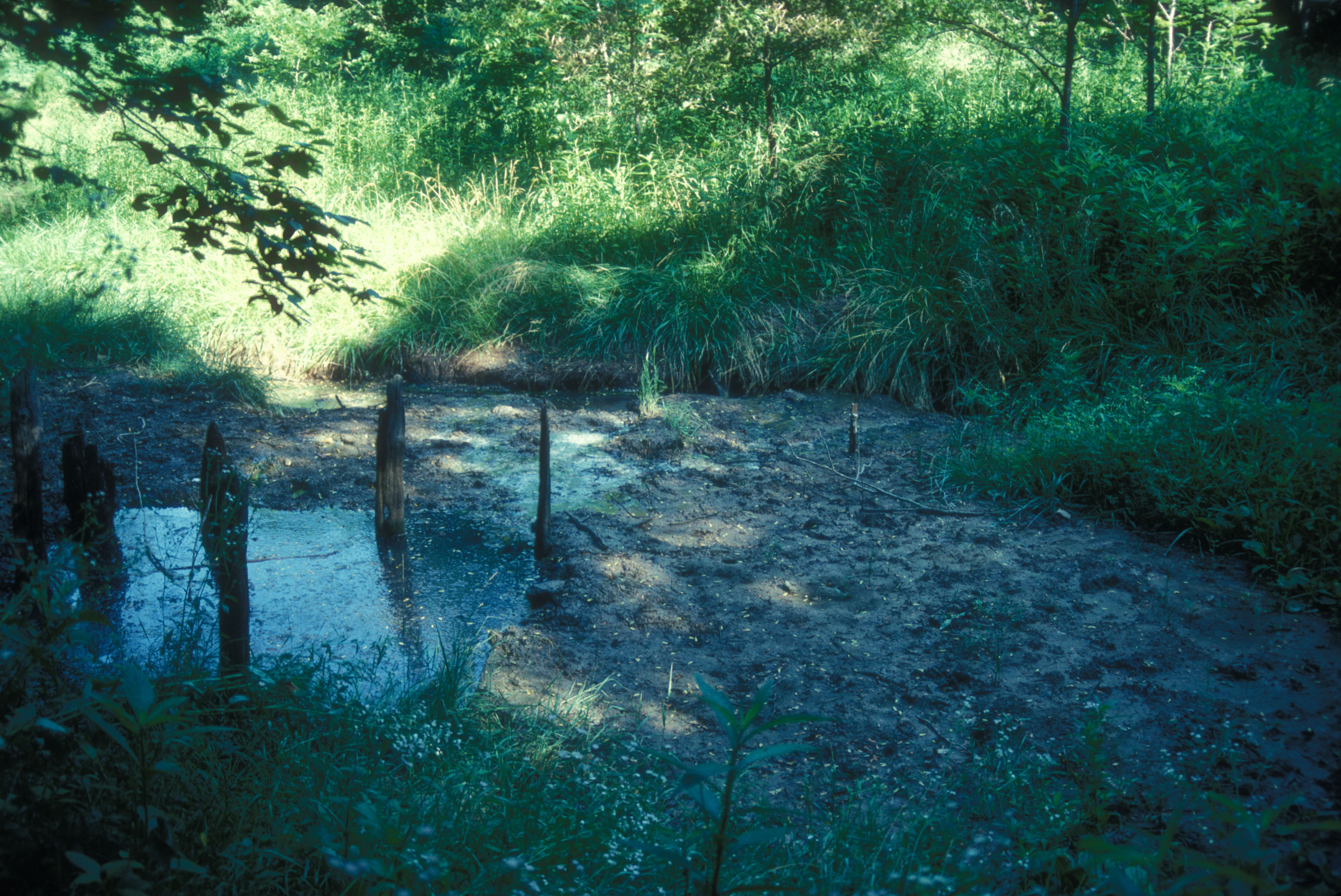
- The springs and remains of the saltworks

- Location within Missouri Location within the United States
- Location: Howard County, Missouri, United States
- Coordinates: 39°4′56″N 92°52′45″W
- Area: 51.17 acres (20.71 ha)
- Established: 1960
- Visitors: 4,885 (in 2022)
- Governing body: Missouri Department of Natural Resources
- Website: Boone's Lick State Historic Site

Boone's Lick State Historic Site is located in Missouri, United States, four miles east of Arrow Rock. The park was established in 1960 around one of the saltwater springs that was used in the early 19th century. It was named after Nathan and Daniel Morgan Boone, sons of famous American frontiersman Daniel Boone, who produced salt from the springs. The springs lent their name to the Boone's Lick Country, the first major American settlement in Central Missouri, and the Boone's Lick Road, which traversed wilderness from St. Charles, Missouri to the boomtown of Franklin, Missouri, in the early 1800s.

== See also ==
- Nathan and Olive Boone Homestead State Historic Site
