= Flat Branch Park =

Park in Columbia, Missouri

- Interactive map of Flat Branch Park
- Location: Columbia, Missouri
- Coordinates: 38°56′59″N 92°19′59″W
- Area: 2.8 acres (11,000 m^{2})
- Established: 1820
- Operator: Columbia Parks and Recreation
- Open: 6 a.m. to 11 p.m, May 1 to September 30
- Website: https://www.como.gov/parks/flat-branch-park

Flat Branch Park is a park in Columbia, Missouri, Adjacent to Flat Branch.

== History ==
Flat Branch Park has been a hub for trade and gatherings since the 1820s. In the early 1900s, the area became a transportation center with the Katy Station, part of the Missouri-Kansas-Texas (MKT) Railroad. After the railroad was abandoned in the 1970s, the right-of-way was converted into the MKT Trail, connecting to the Katy Trail State Park.

=== Phase I ===
In 1997, Columbia received a $40,000 state grant to begin park development. A warehouse on-site was demolished, revealing contaminated soil, delaying construction. Cleanup allowed the site’s designation as a Boone County Historic Site in 1998. The park was completed and dedicated in 2001, featuring a gazebo, landscaping, historic markers, and trail access. The project cost over $500,000, funded by grants, donations, and city tax revenue.

=== Phase II ===
Phase II expanded the park south between Locust and Elm Streets. Soil and stream contamination from former industrial use required major cleanup, supported by a $200,000 EPA grant. Over 8,300 cubic yards of soil were removed, and the stream was restored. Completed in 2006, it was recognized as Missouri’s 300th successful Brownfield cleanup. Park additions included a playground, spraygrounds, amphitheater, bridge, rain garden, and trail connections. The park was officially dedicated in 2008.

== Geography ==
Located in Downtown Columbia, Flat Branch Park is a trailhead for the MKT Trail.

== Construction Projects ==
Below is a table of construction projects in Flat Branch Park

Capital improvement projects
2001	Flat Branch Park – Phase I (4th and Locust Streets)
2007	Annual Roads and Parking: Asphalt new Elm St. parking lot
2008	Flat Branch Park – Phase II (between Locust and Elm Streets)
2009	Annual Park Improvement Project: Wireless Internet
2013	Annual Park Improvement Project: Flat Branch sprayground repair
2016	Council Item: Acquisition of property at 32 S. Providence for Flat Branch Park expansion and Gateway Plaza
2019	African-American Heritage Trail
2021	Flat Branch Park Expansion
