= Cedar Grove (Franklin, Missouri) =

Historic house in Missouri, United States

- U.S. National Register of Historic Places
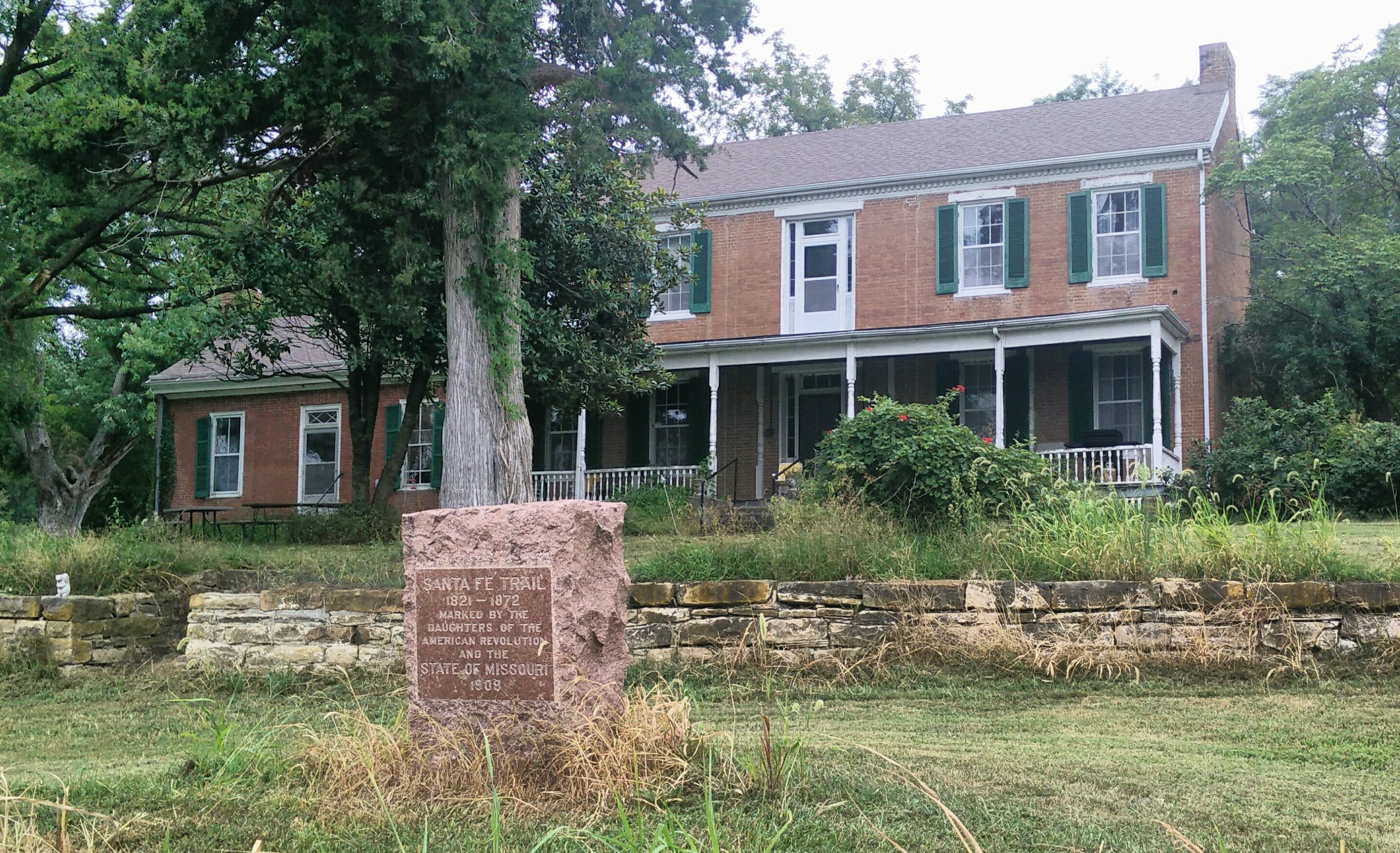
- "Cedar Grove" (Amick-Kingsbury House), 1825 & 1856, on the Santa Fe Trail in Howard County, Missouri, near Franklin

- Location within Missouri Location within the United States
- Location: West of Franklin, Franklin, Missouri
- Coordinates: 39°0′35″N 92°47′57″W
- Area: 2.9 acres (1.2 ha)
- Built: c. 1825, 1856
- Architectural style: Greek Revival, Federal
- NRHP reference No.: 82003140
- Added to NRHP: July 19, 1982

Cedar Grove, also known as the Amick-Kingsbury House, is a historic home located near Franklin, Howard County, Missouri. The original one-story Federal style section was built about 1825, with the two-story Greek Revival main house added in 1856. Both sections are constructed of brick. The original section has a hall and parlor plan and the main house a traditional central passage I-house. Also on the property are two contributing outbuildings.

Located near the northern terminus of the Santa Fe Trail (as noted in the article photo), Cedar Grove was listed on the National Register of Historic Places in 1982.

== Details ==
According to the National Historic Register application:

Cedar Grove is actually two separate houses almost conjoined together--(about 2 inches separates them) a small one story Federal style house, ca. 1825, and a later and much larger "Greek Revival" house built in 1855. Both are constructed of brick, rest on sandstone foundations, and have gable roofs. Together, the houses present a ninety foot frontage, contain nine original rooms and have twenty-seven doors. The house faces south from the base of the river hills that rise from the Missouri River bottoms. A spacious yard contains several sizeable trees including the large cedars, for which the house was named. A hewn stone retaining wall delimits the edge of the front yard; beyond is a Granite marker noting the route of the Santa Fe trail placed by the Daughters of the American Revolution. County Route Z now passes in front of the house and the nearest town of consequence is New Franklin, two miles to the east. Associated with the property are a dilapidated "slave" house, several dilapidated outbuildings and a significant barn built with a hewn, timber frame.

Nicholas Amick House

The one story west section of Cedar Grove is the original Federalist house. It is constructed of brick laid in a Flemish bond pattern on the primary facade, common bond on the remaining facades, and rests on a sandstone foundation. . . .

The interior of the Nicholas Amick house is of the hall and parlor type, the hall being a twenty foot square room, the parlor an approximately twelve by twenty room. These rooms are partitioned by a load bearing brick wall. The "old kitchen 1" that makes up the rear ell is thirteen by seventeen feet. A rock lined cellar underlies the hall and reveals that the floor rests on log sleepers some eighteen inches in diameter.

Horace Kingsbury House

The Horace Kingsbury house is a traditional central passage I-form (one room deep, two or more rooms wide and two full stories in height) five bays wide and of brick construction resting on a sandstone foundation.

Outbuildings

Just behind the house is a frame outbuilding, once the servants' quarters, which is now in poor shape. Another small frame building sits by the garden and a chicken house is also in back.

Only the foundations remain of the springhouse and the smokehouse.

Barn

A barn is located some 120 meters east of the Kinqsbury residence. This barn is of a transverse crib variety with shed additions that encircle the building on the north, west and south sides with yet another lean-to on the downhill south side. Heavy hand hewn beams approximately 12" square are mortised together to support this stout structure and all rafters consist of poles with the bark stripped off. Although the study of Missouri barns is still in its infancy, this barn must be an old one, at least the contemporary of the Kingsbury if not the Amick House.

== Photos ==
1825 Amick-Kingsbury House, Howard County, Missouri
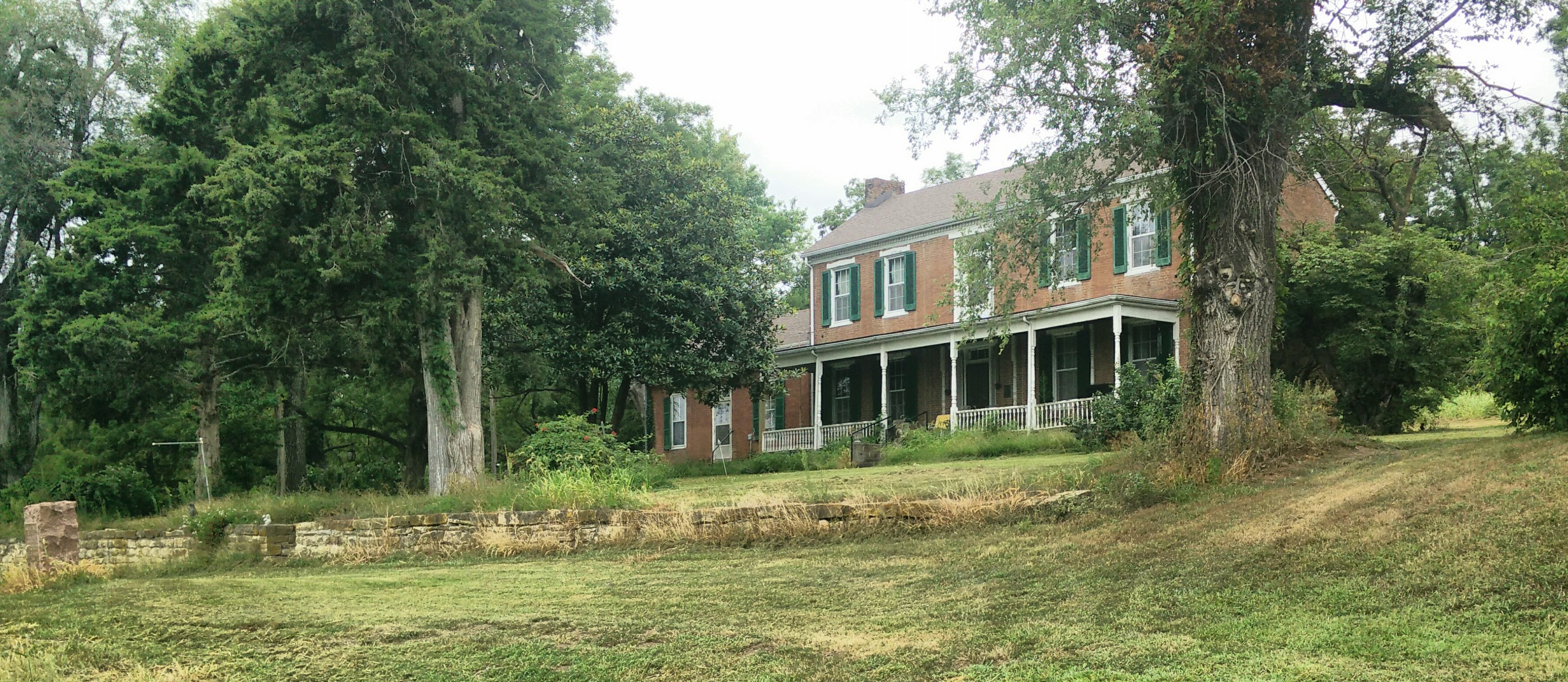
"Cedar Grove" (Amick-Kingsbury House), 1825 & 1856, on the Santa Fe Trail in Howard County, Missouri, near Franklin

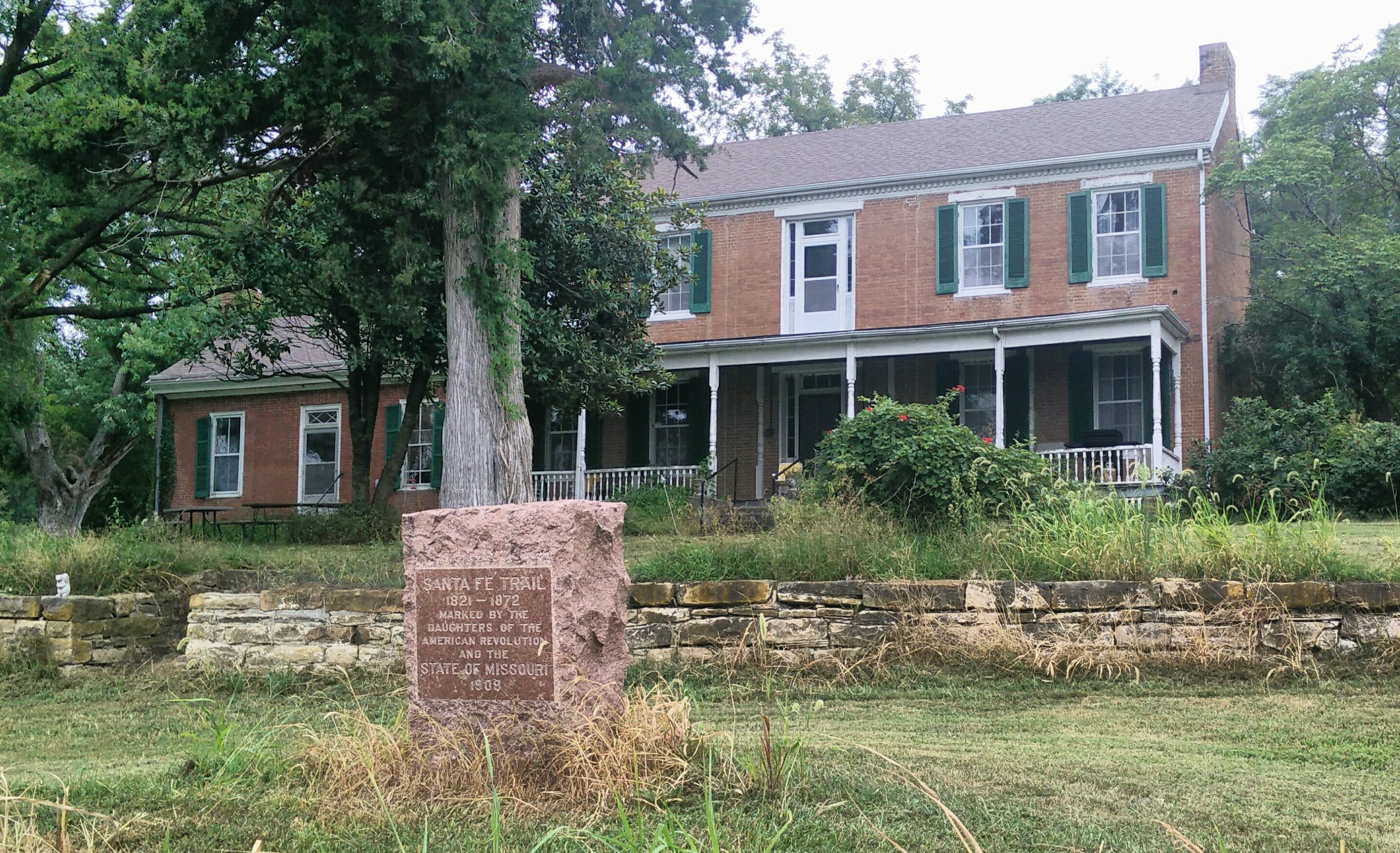
"Cedar Grove" (Amick-Kingsbury House). The 1909 Daughters of the American Revolution/State of Missouri Santa Fe Trail Monument is shown in the foreground. The Santa Fe Trail started in Franklin, just a few miles to the east, and ran directly in front of the house.

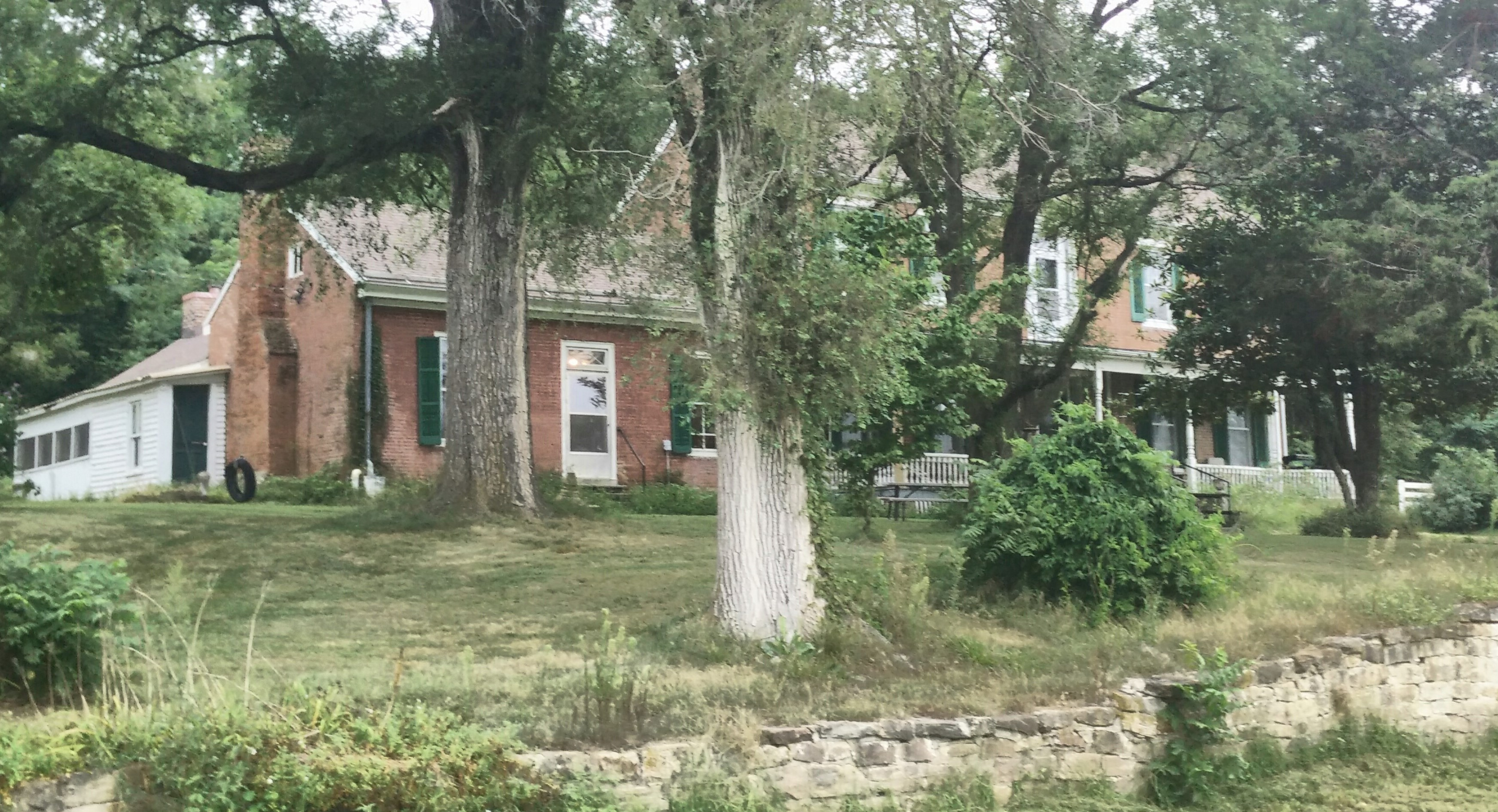
"Cedar Grove" (Amick-Kingsbury House). The smaller one-story Federal section dating from about 1825 is to the left; the two-story Greek Revival section dating to 1856 is to the right. Later additions can be seen behind the Federal section. The house is still used as a residence.
