= Ann Hawkins Gentry =

- Born: January 21, 1791; Madison County, Kentucky, U.S.
- Died: January 18, 1870 (aged 78); Columbia, Missouri, U.S.
- Occupations: postmistress, pioneer
- Known for: second woman in the United States to serve as a postmistress
- Spouse: Richard Gentry (m. 1810; died 1837)

Ann Hawkins Gentry (January 21, 1791 – January 18, 1870) was the second woman in the United States to become a postmistress as well as a leading pioneer in Columbia, Missouri. She was the wife of American politician and military officer Richard Gentry who became Columbia's first mayor.

In 1791 Ann Hawkins Gentry was born to Nicholas Hawkins, a Revolutionary War veteran, and Ann Robinson Hawkins who lived in Madison County, Kentucky. On February 10, 1810, she married Richard Gentry. Ann Hawkins was 19 when she married Richard Gentry. Their child arrived while her husband was serving under General William Henry Harrison on Lake Erie during the War of 1812. In 1818, she rode sidesaddle carrying the youngest of her four children from Madison County, Kentucky to St. Louis, Missouri. She would have a total of 13 children. In 1820, her family occupied the first cabin in Smithton, Missouri—what would later become Columbia.

Thomas Hart Benton helped her secure her historic appointment as postmistress after her husband died in 1837 fighting in the Second Seminole War. Her husband had been Columbia's second postmaster, running it from one corner of their tavern. Ann Gentry served as postmistress from 1838 until 1865.

The following were named after Ann Hawkins Gentry:

- Ann Hawkins Gentry Roadside Park (1960)
- Ann Hawkins Gentry Building, the city of Columbia rededicated this building (1977)
- Ann Hawkins Gentry Middle School opened in Columbia (1993)
