= Hinkson Creek =

Stream in the U.S. state of Missouri

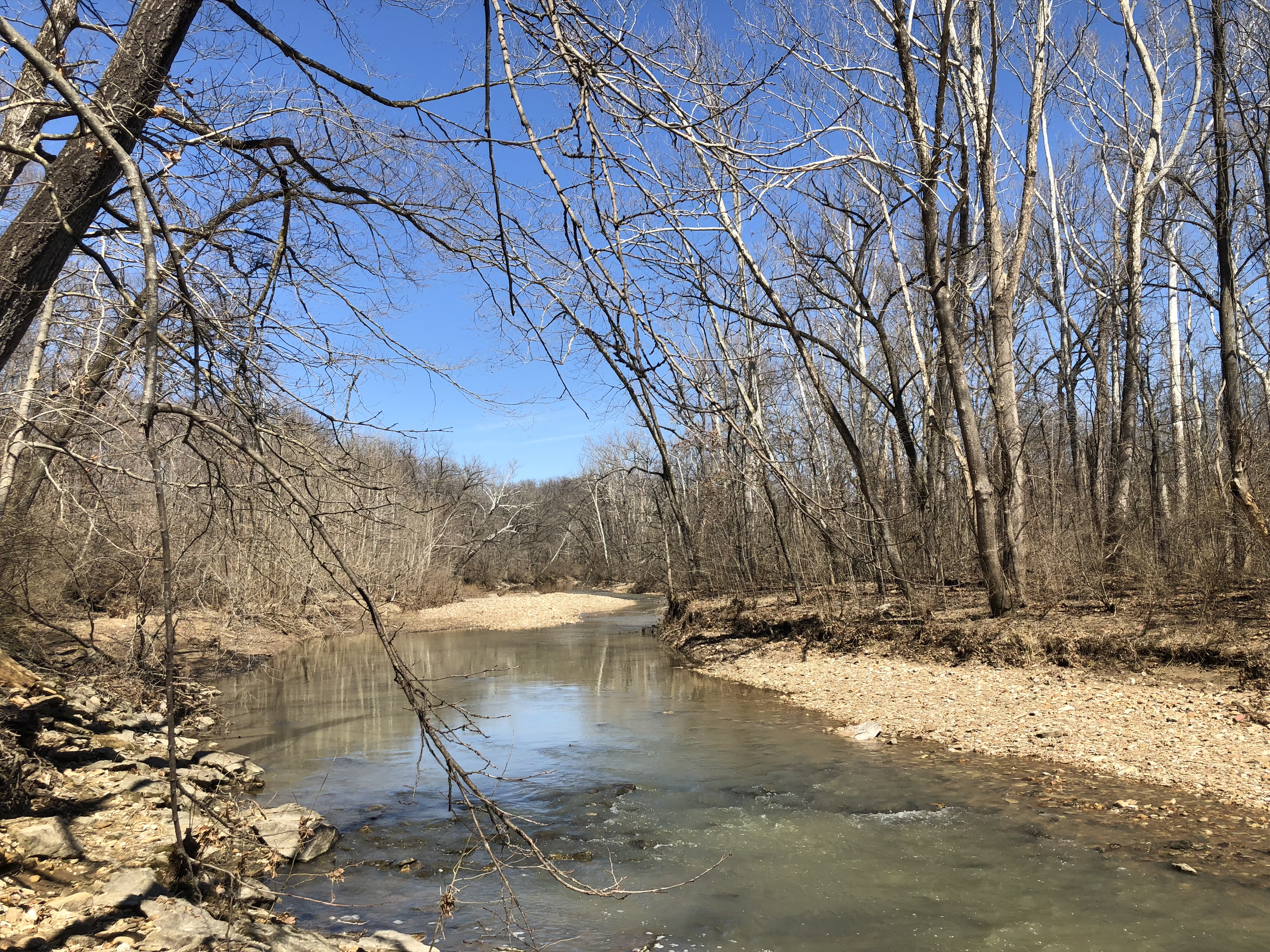
Hinkson Creek on the University of Missouri campus

Hinkson Creek is a stream in Boone County in the U.S. state of Missouri. Its middle section runs through the city of Columbia, Missouri It was named after Robert Hinkson, a pioneer citizen who lived along its banks. Several trails, conservation areas, and parks are along its path. it eventually empties into Perche Creek southwest of Columbia. The MKT Trail follows the creek in Boone County.

The stream headwaters arise at 39°07′50″N 92°10′51″W approximately two miles northeast of Hallsville at an approximate elevation of 880 feet. The stream flows south-southwest past Hallsville and through the east side of Columbia where it passes under US Route 63 and I-70. South of Columbia the stream turns to the west-southwest and reaches its confluence with Perche Creek at 38°55′19″N 92°24′51″W at an elevation of 558 feet.

The Hinkson Woods Conservation Area is located within meanders of the creek. On June 25, 2021 the Hinkson flooded, reaching a record 23.04 feet in Columbia.

== Gallery ==
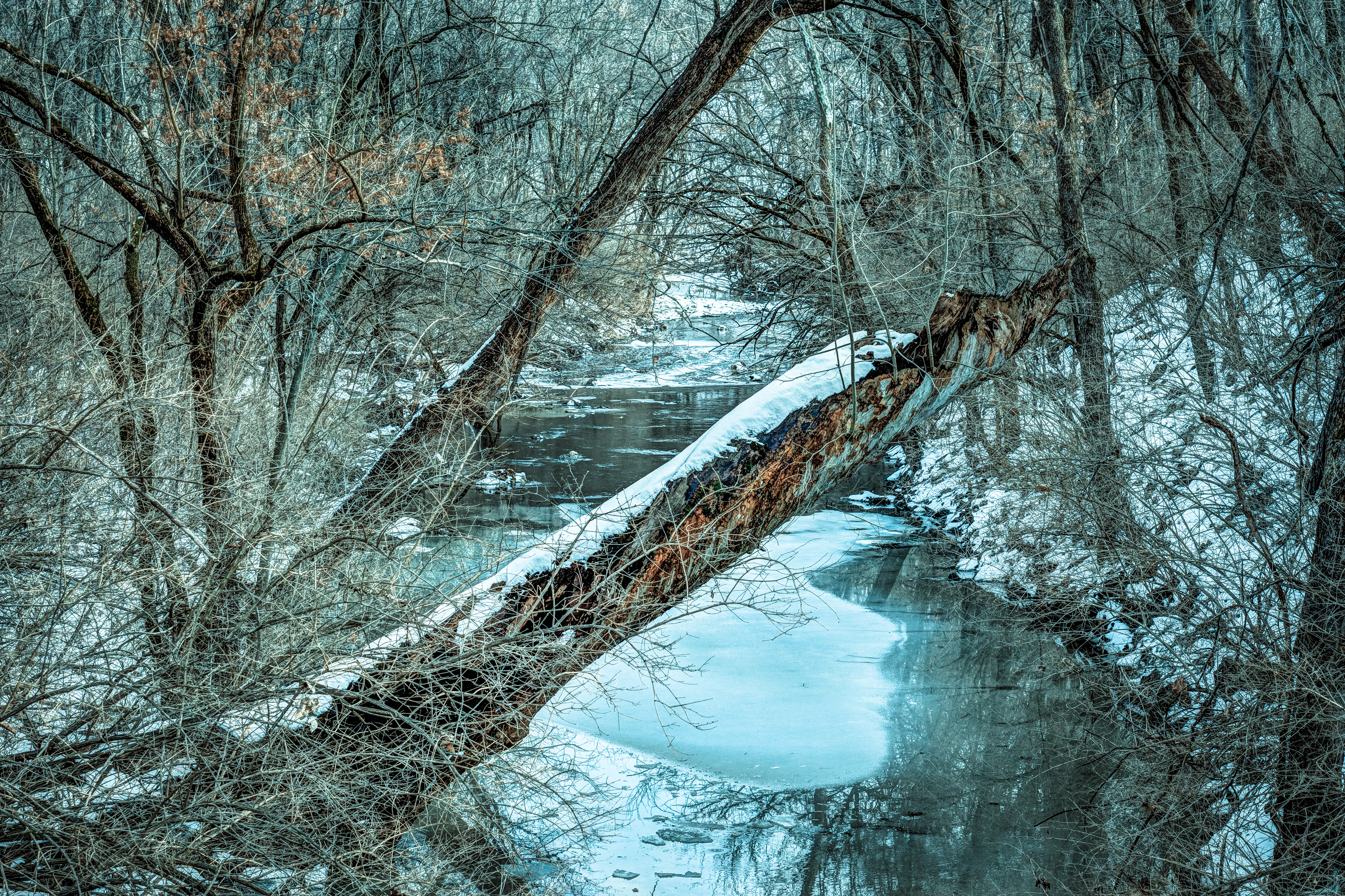
Hinkson Creek in February 2015 after snow

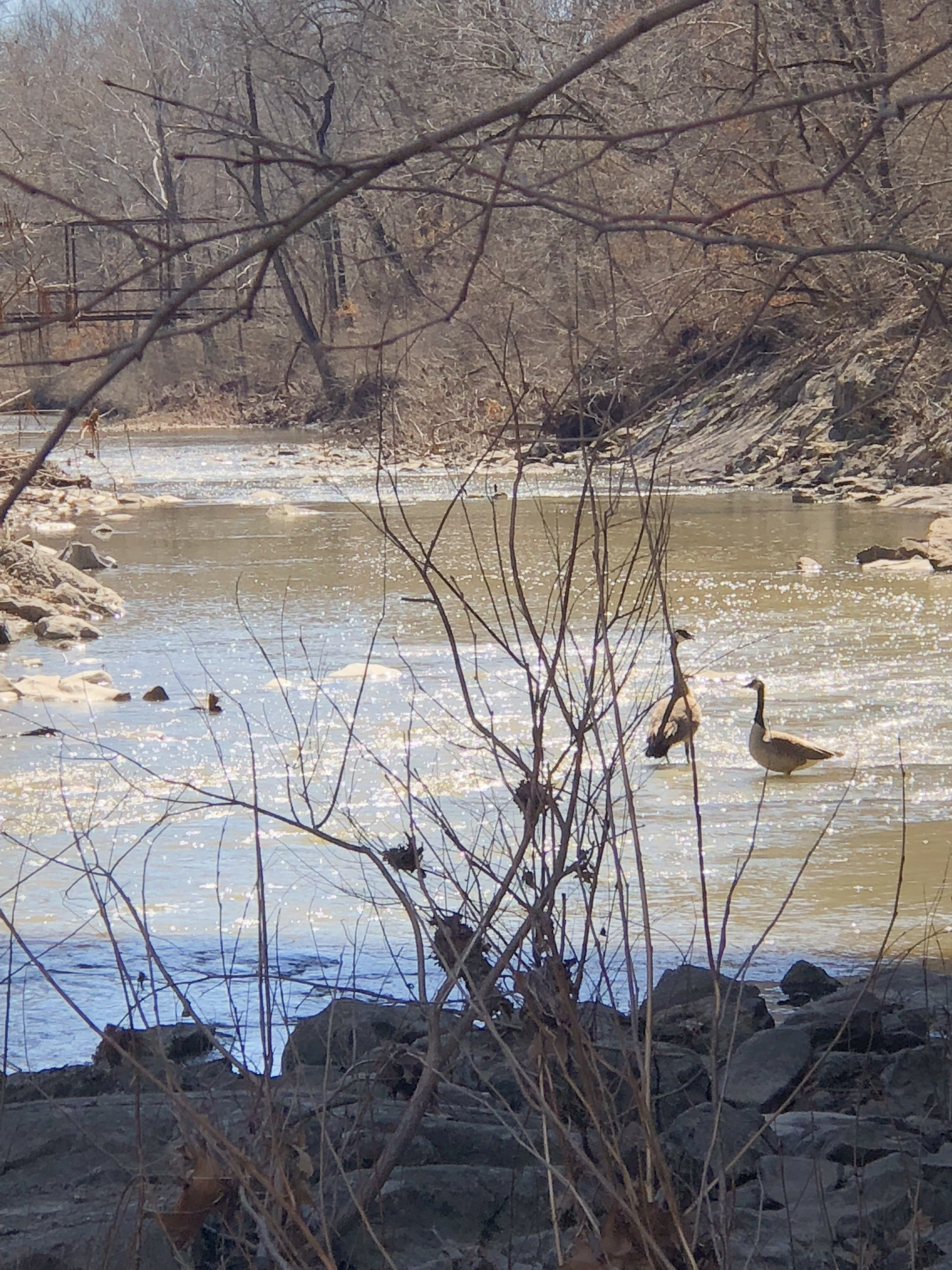
Canada geese near Stadium Blvd in 2019

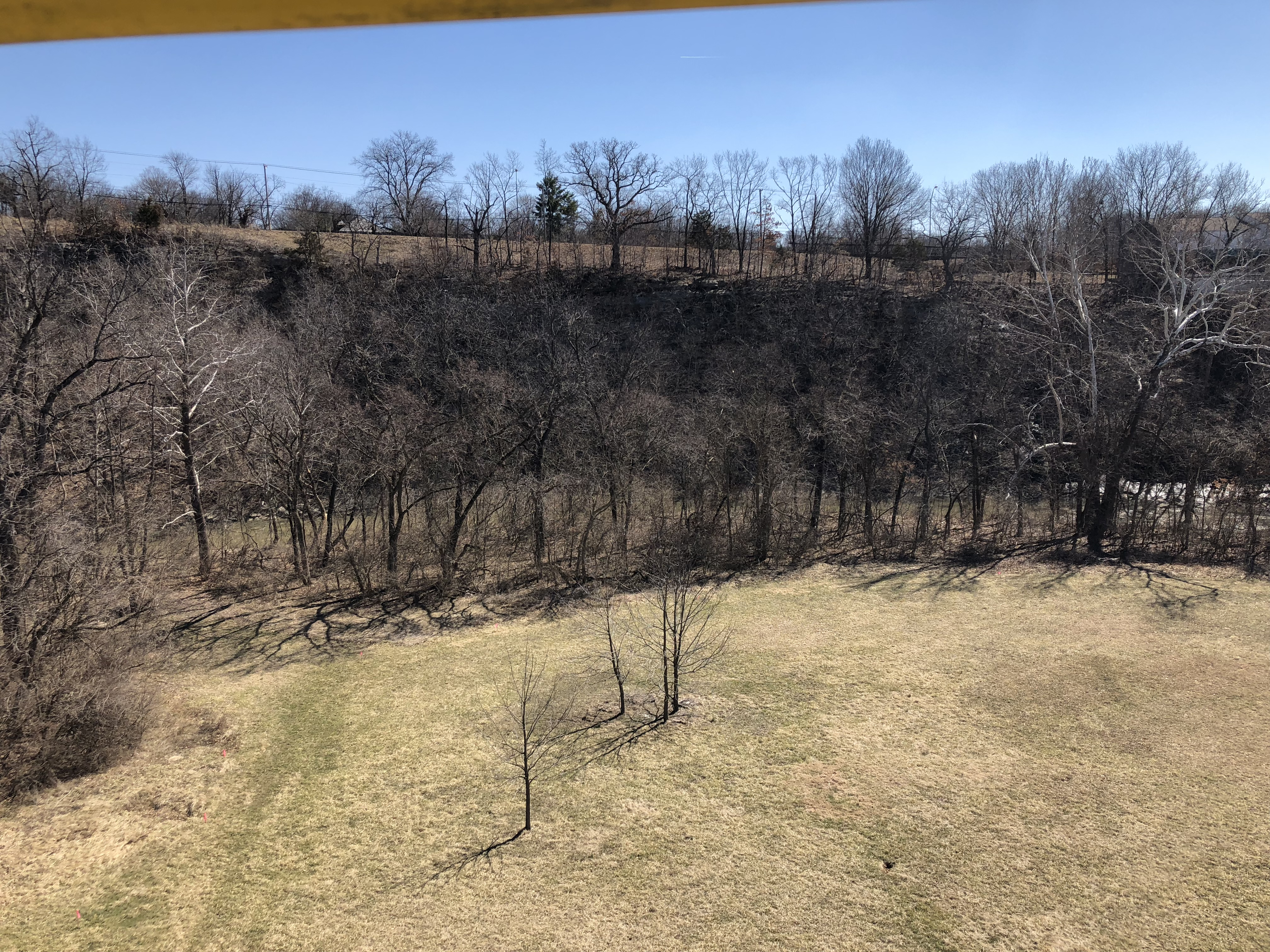
A bluff near Old Highway 63 in 2019

== See also ==
- List of rivers of Missouri
