= Columbia station (Missouri, Kansas, and Texas Railroad) =

- Missouri, Kansas, and Texas Railroad Depot
- U.S. National Register of Historic Places
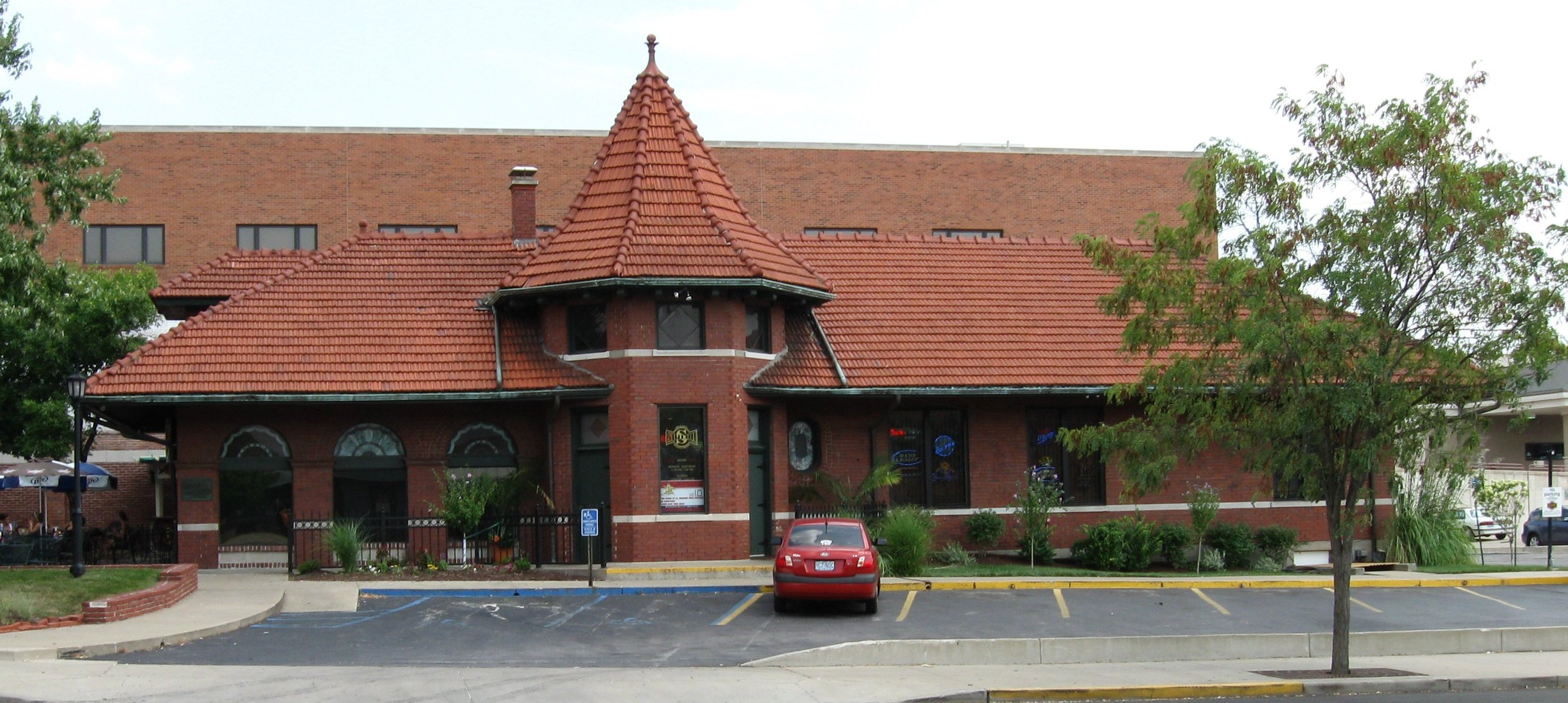
- The front of Katy Station from 4th Street in Downtown Columbia, Missouri

- Location within Missouri Location within the United States
- Location: 402 E. Broadway, Columbia, Missouri
- Coordinates: 38°57′4.7″N 92°19′58″W
- Area: 0.3 acres (0.12 ha)
- Built: 1909
- Architect: Missouri–Kansas–Texas Railroad
- NRHP reference No.: 79001350
- Added to NRHP: January 29, 1979

The Columbia station, also known as Missouri, Kansas, and Texas Railroad Depot or Katy Station, was built in 1909 by the Missouri–Kansas–Texas Railroad in downtown Columbia, Missouri. The station was one of two train stations serving Columbia in the 20th century, the other being the Wabash Railroad Station and Freight House, which was constructed the same year. The building is the terminus of the MKT Trail, a rails-to-trails project that was built on the former spur of the railroad. Having previously housed a popular local restaurant, "Katy Station", named after the building, it now houses a bar and grill named "Shiloh's."

The property was listed on the National Register of Historic Places in 1979.

Preceding station	Missouri–Kansas–Texas Railroad	Following station
McBaine Terminus	Columbia Branch	Terminus
