= MKT Trail =

Trail in Missouri

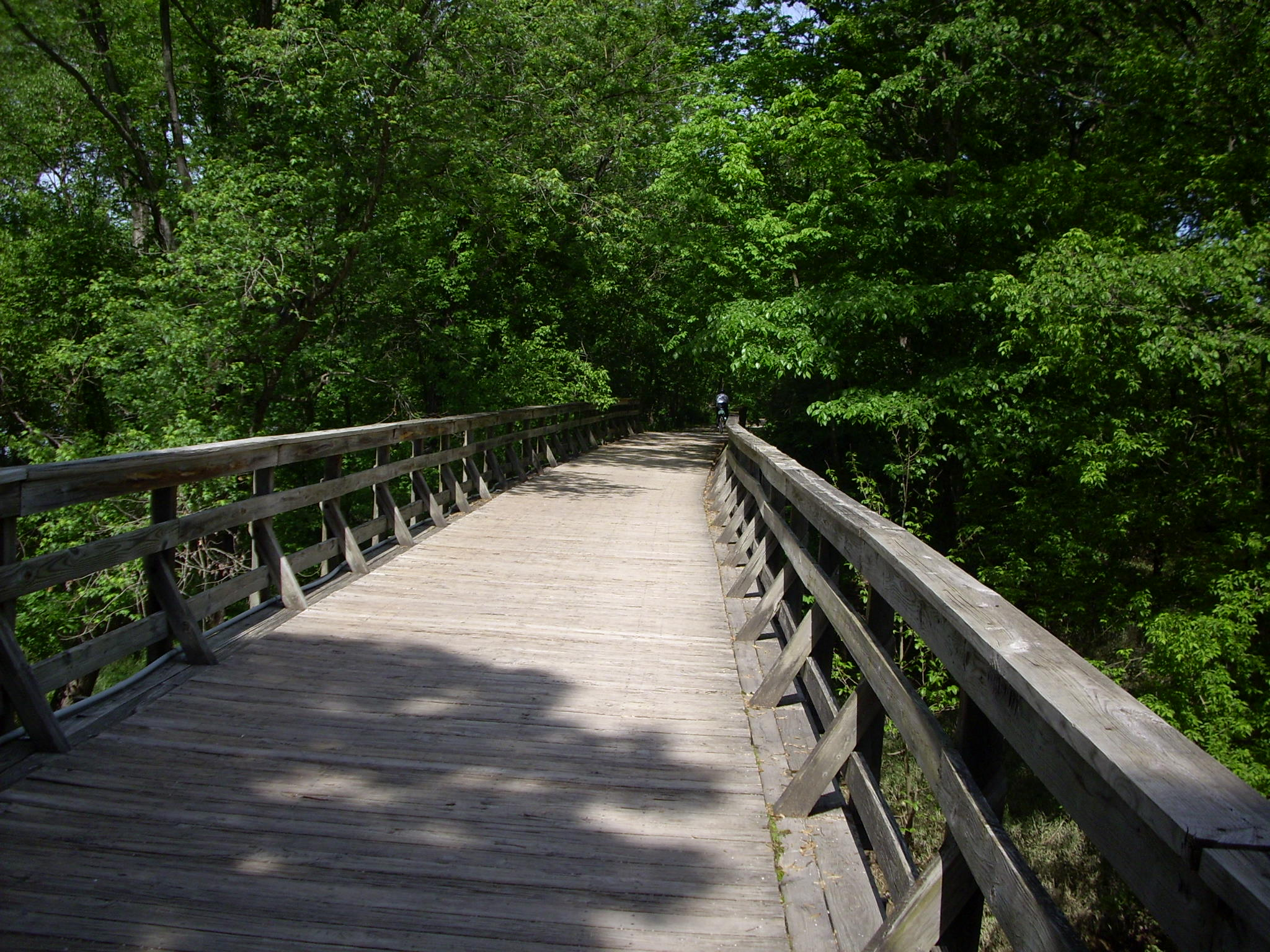
- Length: 8.9 mi (14.3 km)
- Location: Boone County, Missouri, USA
- Trailheads: Flat Branch Park; 38°57′03″N 92°19′59″W; Hindman Junction (Katy Trail); 38°53′27″N 92°27′01″W
- Use: Hiking, Cycling
- Elevation change: negligible
- Highest point: Downtown Columbia
- Lowest point: McBaine Bottoms
- Difficulty: Easy
- Season: All
- Hazards: Severe weather Poison ivy

The MKT Nature and Fitness Trail is a recreational rail trail in Columbia, Missouri, that runs nine miles (14 km) in the right-of-way of the former Missouri–Kansas–Texas Railroad. Developed from 1982 onward, it is a spur of the longest rail trail in the United States, the Katy Trail. It is open for use by hikers, joggers, and cyclists year-round, from sunrise to sunset, with snow covering in the winter offering users cross-country skiing opportunities. The trail is made up of "limestone pug" (crushed limestone), creating a hard, flat surface. The trail follows Flat Branch Creek and Hinkson Creek for much of their distance and is part of a larger system of recreational pathways in the Columbia Metropolitan Area.

== History ==
=== Paving the MKT ===
In 2006, Ted Curtis, the senior planner for Columbia's Non-Motorized Grant Program, proposed to pave the trail. While Curtis's proposal allowed for the trail to resist weather damage better and was in line with an initiative to improve recreational opportunities for the trail's use, many protested the paving plan, claiming it would interfere with the enjoyment of nature and remove a major soft-surface path for runners. In response, Curtis revised the plan to include a shoulder on the trail for runners and build spur trails that lead to creeks and other aspects of nature.
