= Flat Branch (Hinkson Creek tributary) =

River in the United States of America

Coordinates: 38.9267043°N 92.3571286°W

Flat Branch is a stream in Columbia, Missouri. It was the original water source for the town of Columbia and its forerunner Smithton. It is a branch of Hinkson Creek and begins Northwest of Downtown Columbia, and passes through Flat Branch Park. Flat Branch Park straddles the creek between 4th Street and Providence. Flat Branch was so named on account of its low riverbanks.

== History ==
Flat Branch was originally forested when American pioneers arrived to permanently settle in 1818. The cabin of Richard Gentry was located near present-day Garth and Walnut up the hill from the creek. Early tanneries were located along the banks. North of Broadway and on either side of the creek was a historically black neighborhood. Ragtime pianist Blind Boone composed a work titled “Strains from the Flat Branch” for piano. The M.K.T. Railroad entered Columbia through the Flat Branch Valley. Today the M.K.T. Trail is built on the former train path. Columbia's first modern brewery Flat Branch Pub is named after the creek.

== See also ==
- List of rivers of Missouri
