= Tree of Peace Society =

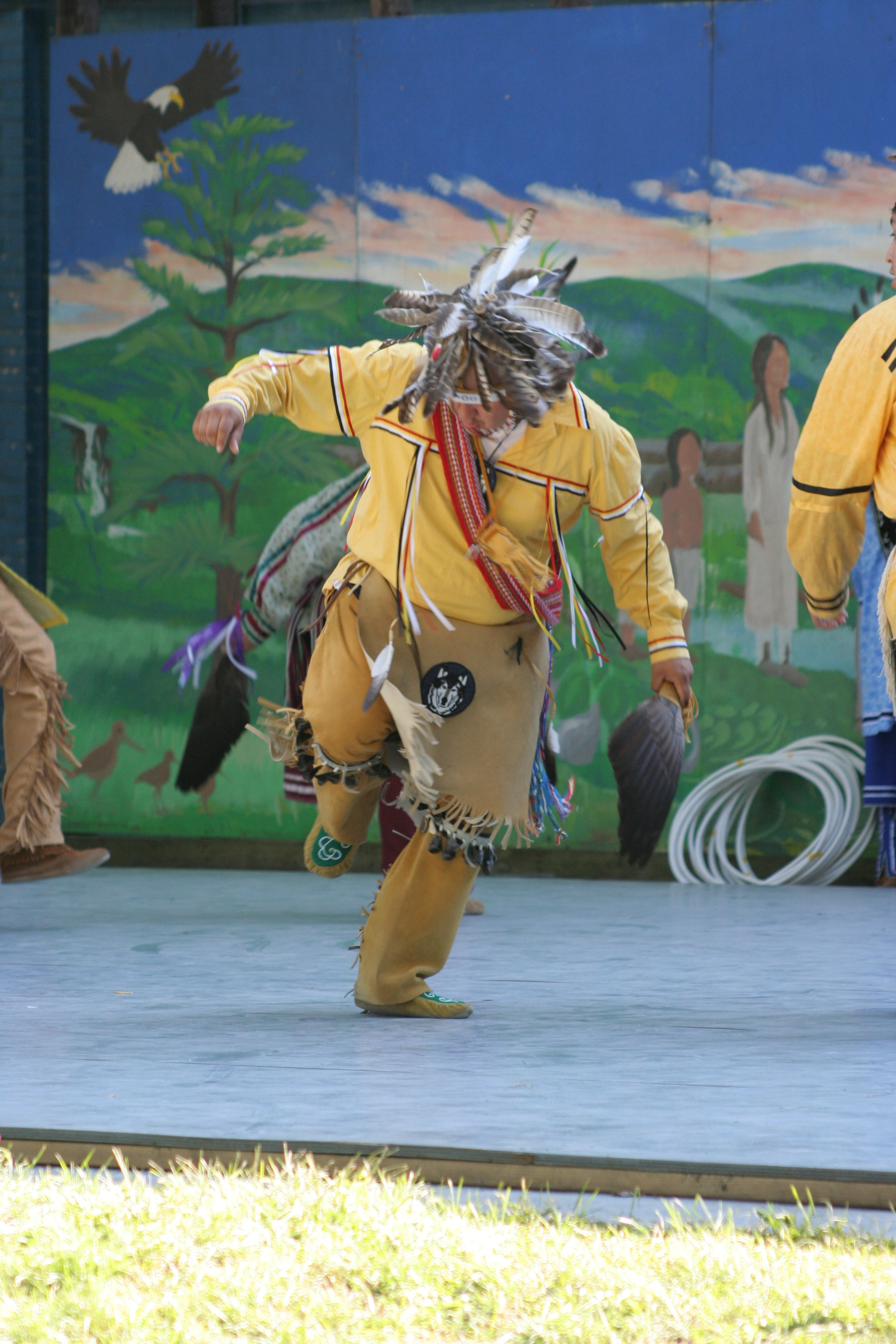
Haudenosaunee dancer, New York State Fair, 2008. The Tree of Peace Society is based in ancient political and religious beliefs of the Six Nations, and associated with Hiawatha and a sacred pine tree, the Tree of Peace depicted in background mural.

The Tree of Peace Society was founded in 1984 and incorporated in New York State on October 17, 1994, as a "foreign" not-for-profit corporation ("foreign" a legal formality owing to tribal sovereignty considerations). Its headquarters are located on the Akwesasne Mohawk reservation in Hogansburg, New York, which borders the provinces of Quebec and Ontario, Canada, along the St. Lawrence River.

Since 1984, society members, headed by founder Chief Jake Swamp have ceremoniously planted trees in significant public places, such as near Philadelphia's Constitution Hall in 1986 and on April 10, 1986, at Shasta Hall, California State University, Sacramento, California The organization's official website explains the ancient Haudenosaunee tradition behind the group's work:

Haudenosaunee flag created in the 1980s, based on the Hiawatha wampum belt "created from purple and white wampum beads centuries ago to symbolize the union forged when the former enemies buried their weapons under the Great Tree of Peace." It represents the original five nations that were united by the Peacemaker and Hiawatha. The tree symbol in the center represents an Eastern White Pine, the needles of which are clustered in groups of five.

The Great Tree of Peace [of the] Haudenosaunee (Iroquois) Confederacy -- Over a thousand years ago, the Peacemaker...Aiionwatha (Hiawatha) brought the Great Law of Peace (Kaianerekowa) to the warring Indian nations of what is now New York State. The message of Peace, Power, and the Good Mind resulted in the forming of the Haudenosaunee Iroquois Confederacy. The league of nations consisted of the Mohawk, Oneida, Onondaga, Cayuga, and Seneca, and later the Tuscarora. These nations were instructed to bury their weapons of war under the Great Tree of Peace, and to unite as one to uphold the Great Law of Peace by joining "arms" so that the Tree of Peace would never fall.

The educational website Past is Prologue contains an article explaining more about how and why Trees of Peace are planted by the group:

...Chief Jake Swamp of the Mohawk Nation and co-director of the Tree of Peace Society travels around the world planting Trees of Peace, including on the Smithsonian Mall during the Bicentennial celebration in honor of the contributions to the U.S. Constitution which came from the Iroquois Great Law of Peace. Such traditional ceremonies cannot, of course, be replicated by non-Iroquois...Suggestions for Ceremony: Call the group together with music. If a Native American drumming (much of which is sacred) group is available in your area, this would be appropriate. Form a circle around the tree. Readings could include The Great Tree of Peace from Three Strands in the Braid: A Guide for Enablers of Learning ...Select two items to be buried under the roots to symbolize national unity and peace. In the original ceremony, weapons of war were buried...

(Another book by the author of Three Strands in the Braid features cover art depicting Benjamin Franklin sitting under a Tree of Peace and negotiating with a chief in the Iroquois Grand Council.)
