= Boone's Lick Road =

Transportation route in Missouri, United States

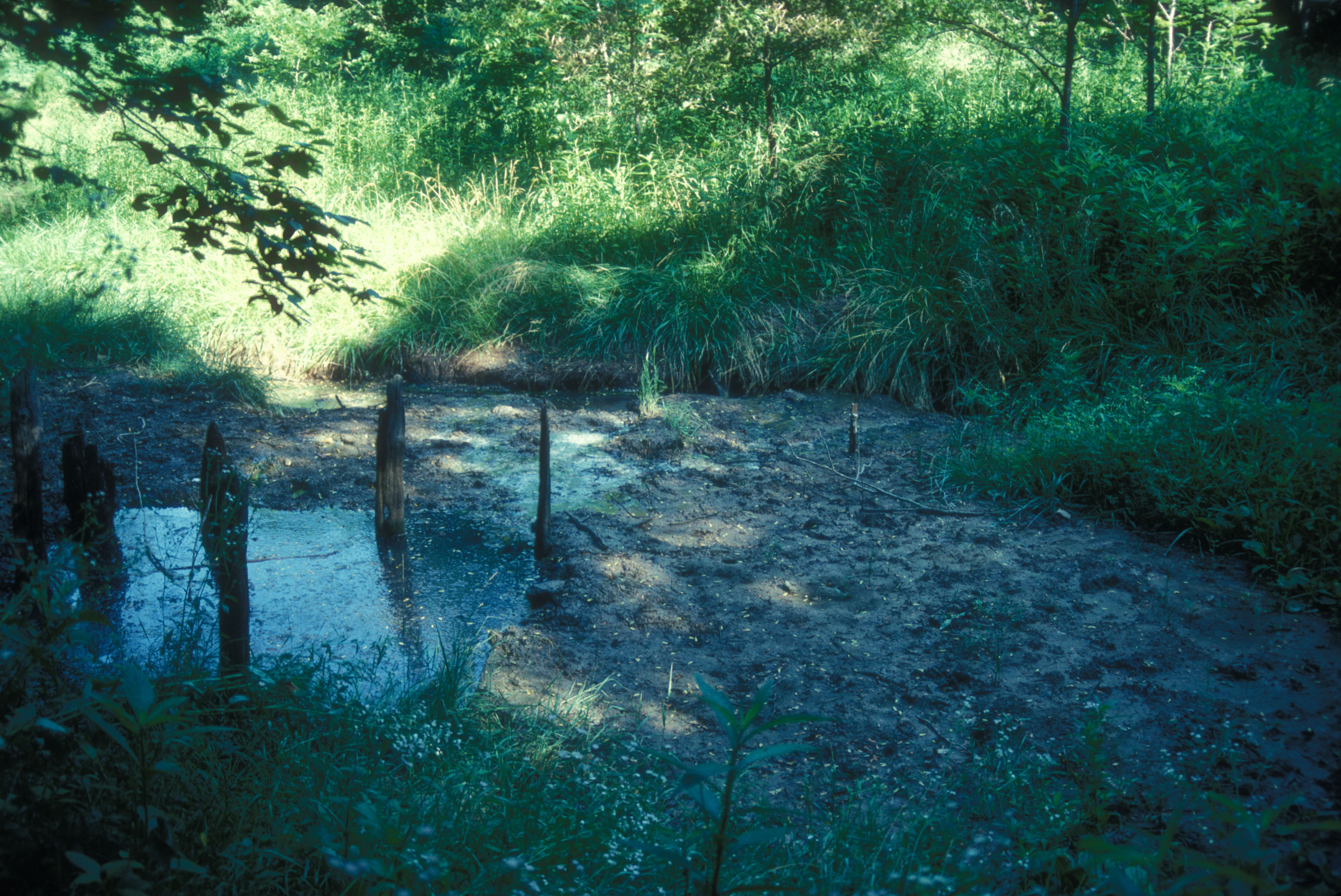
The salt spring known as "Boon's Lick" in Howard County, Missouri.

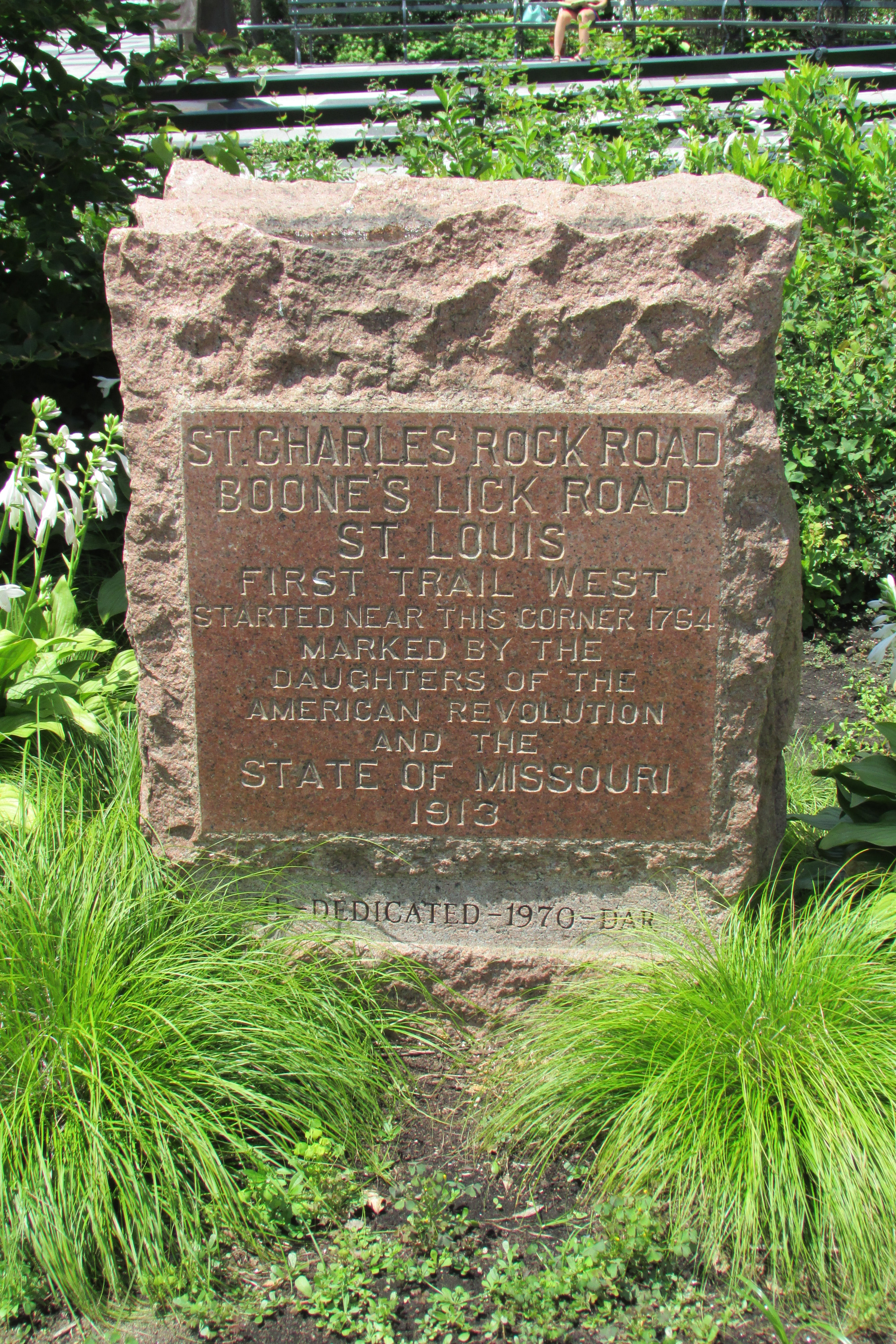
Boone’s Lick Road Marker in St. Charles, Missouri

The Boone's Lick Road or Boonslick Trail was an early 1800s transportation route from eastern to central Missouri in the United States. Running east–west on the north side and roughly parallel to the Missouri River the trail began in the river port of St. Charles. The trail played a major role in the westward expansion of the United States and the development of Missouri's statehood. The trail's eventual terminus at Franklin was the start of the better-known Santa Fe Trail. First traced by the sons of Daniel Boone, the path originally ended at a salt lick in Howard County used by the pair to manufacture salt. Today the lick is maintained as Boone's Lick State Historic Site.

== History ==
A large area in central Missouri became known as the Boonslick, or "Boonslick country." It was the core of a larger area eventually known as Little Dixie, because it was settled primarily by migrants from the Upper South, who developed hemp and tobacco plantations dependent on enslaved African-American workers.

Parts of the trail eventually were improved or developed as paved roads. Its route is the forerunner to today's U.S. Highway 40 and Interstate 70. Towns founded along the trail include Franklin, Smithton, Columbia, Fulton, Williamsburg, and Warrenton among others.

== Route ==
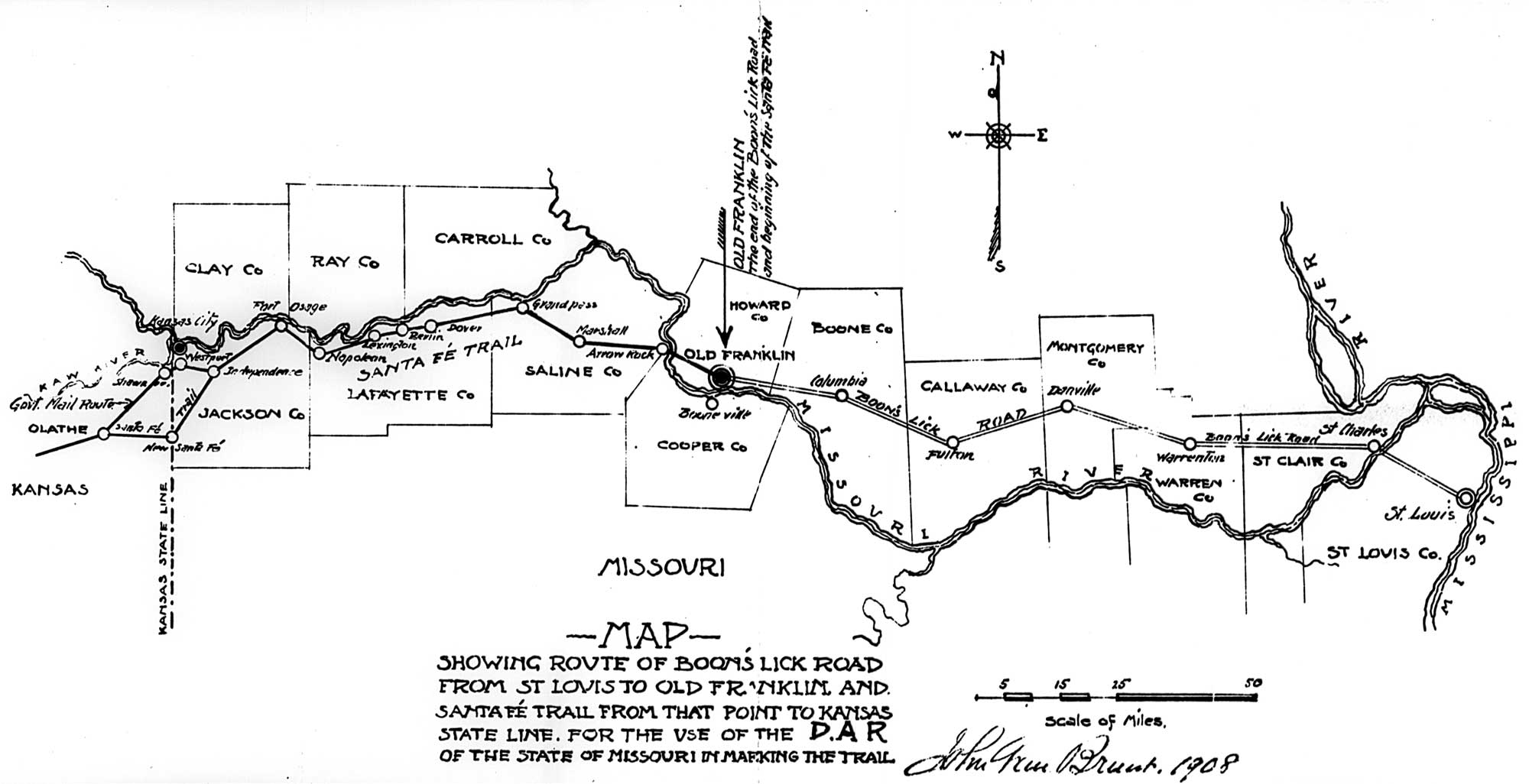
The Boone's Lick Road and Santa Fe Trail in Missouri

The trail began at the Missouri River port of St. Charles, Missouri, a late colonial town, and struck a westward path through present-day St. Charles, Warren, Montgomery, Callaway, Boone and Howard counties. Different shortcuts were made on the trail as towns and county seats were founded, especially in Boone and Callaway counties. Major streams crossed include Cedar, Roche Perche, and Moniteau creeks.

The route was followed by Joseph Smith and his followers, members of the new Church of the Latter Day Saints in 1830s and 40s on their way to establish the settlement of Far West, Missouri.

== See also ==
- Great Osage Trail
