= Richard Gentry (Missouri politician) =

American politician and soldier (1788–1837)

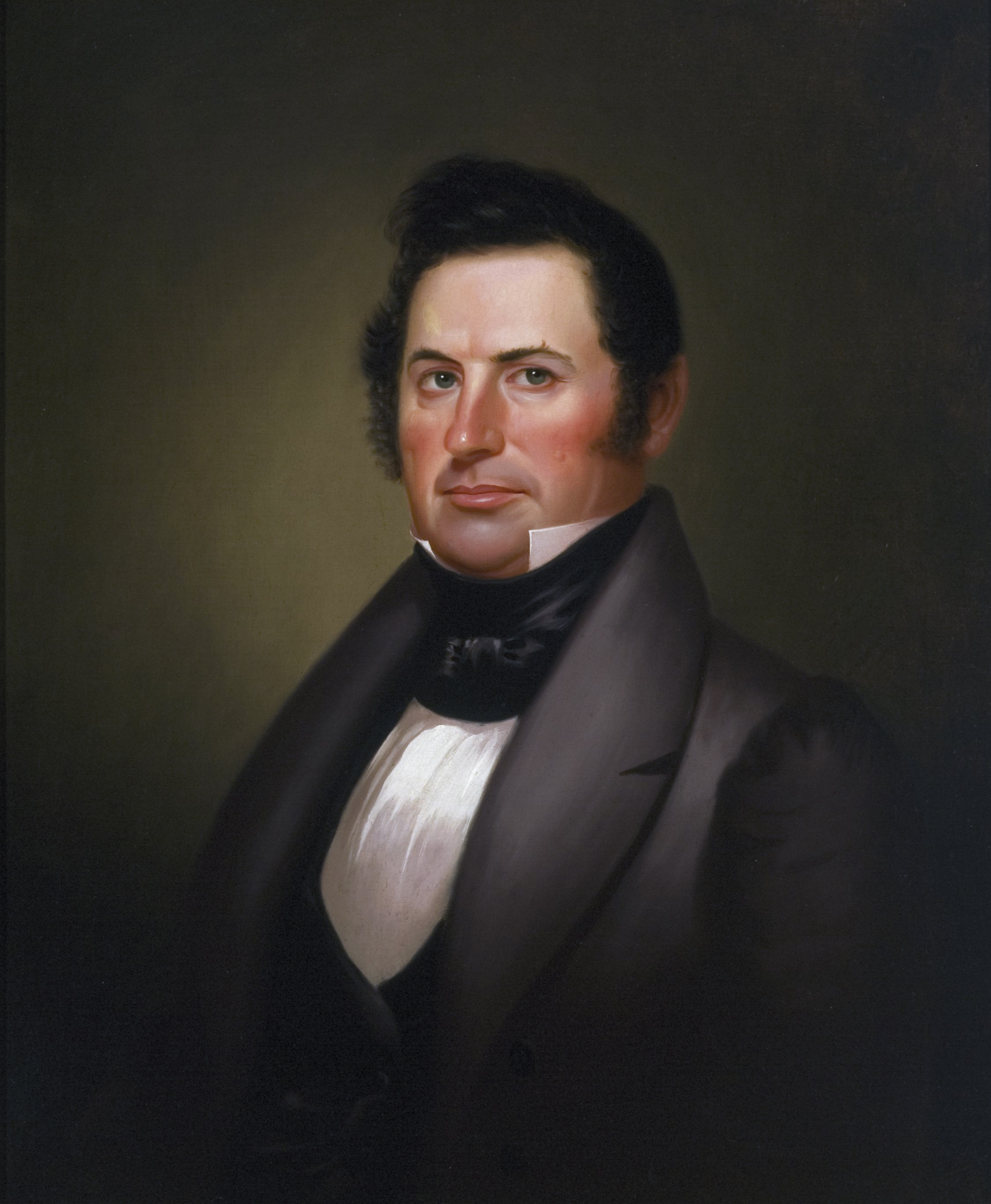
- Portrait by George Caleb Bingham

Mayor of Columbia, Missouri
- In office 1821

Member of the Missouri Senate
- In office 1826–1830

Personal details
- Born: August 25, 1788 Boonesborough, Kentucky, United States
- Died: December 25, 1837 (aged 49) Near Lake Okeechobee, Florida, United States
- Resting place: Jefferson Barracks, Missouri, United States
- Party: Democratic
- Spouse: Ann Hawkins Gentry
- Children: 13

Military service
- Allegiance: United States
- Branch/service: Kentucky Militia; Missouri Militia
- Years of service: 1808–1837
- Rank: Captain (Kentucky Militia); Major General (Missouri Militia)
- Battles/wars: War of 1812; Battle of the Thames; Black Hawk War; Second Seminole War; Battle of Lake Okeechobee †

Richard Gentry (August 25, 1788 – December 25, 1837) was an American politician, slave owner, and soldier from Missouri. Gentry was killed in Florida at the Battle of Lake Okeechobee during the Seminole Wars. The Missouri county of Gentry is named for him. He was the first mayor and founder of Columbia, Missouri.

== Early life ==
Richard Gentry was born August 25, 1788, in Madison County, Kentucky (then part of Virginia) to parents Richard and Jane (Harris) Gentry, who were both of English descent. His father was a veteran of the American Revolutionary War who served in the Continental Army, and he had fought at the Siege of Yorktown. His father was also "wealthy in lands and slaves" and owned a plantation in Kentucky. Young Richard grew up a child of the frontier, skilled in hunting and tracking, skills that would well serve him later in his military career. At age 19, Richard Gentry was commissioned as a Lieutenant in the 19th Regiment of the Kentucky Militia and quickly promoted to Captain three years later in 1811. On February 13, 1810, Gentry married Ann Hawkins, also of Madison County. They would eventually have many children.

== War, new frontier, and politics ==
Gentry served under General (and future U.S. president) William Henry Harrison in the Great Lakes region during the War of 1812. At the Battle of the Thames, Gentry and his soldiers charged through the British line and attacked the enemy from the rear, resulting in their surrender. In 1816, Gentry left Kentucky with his family and several slaves to move to the new Missouri Territory, first settling in St. Louis County for a brief time before moving on upriver to the area around Franklin. Gentry was part of a wave of Southern settlers who migrated to Missouri with their slaves and formed the region of Little Dixie. In 1820, Gentry was one of the founders of Smithton, the village that would become Columbia, Missouri, and built the first home there for his family. Gentry defeated William Jewell to be elected Columbia's first Mayor. Gentry owned a farm near Columbia where his slaves would work.

In 1820, Richard Gentry shot and killed Henry Carroll over a land dispute in Howard County, Missouri. Gentry claimed that he had killed Carroll in a pistol duel, while his detractors claimed that he had murdered Carroll in an unprovoked attack. Gentry hired his personal friend Thomas Hart Benton, the future Senator of Missouri, to be his defense lawyer. Gentry was later acquitted of the murder in 1821.

Richard Gentry was commissioned as a Colonel in the new Missouri Militia in 1822, and four years later, in 1826, elected to a term in the Missouri Senate. President Andrew Jackson appointed Gentry as Postmaster for Columbia, Missouri, in 1830, a post he held until his death. In 1832, during the Black Hawk War, Gentry was commissioned as a Major General of the Missouri Militia and sent with a large force of troops to the northern border of Missouri to prevent a threatened raid by Chief Black Hawk's warriors. During this brief war, James S. Rollins served as an aide-de-camp to General Gentry.

== Final battle and death ==
President Martin Van Buren asked Missouri for volunteers in 1837 to help fight against the Seminole tribe in Florida who were resisting Indian Removal. Missouri Senator Thomas Hart Benton agreed to send a regiment of the Missouri Militia to Florida, and he boasted that the Missourians would turn the tide of the war because of their experience on the western frontier. Richard Gentry was chosen to lead the Missouri Militia against the Seminoles, and he was given another commission as Colonel. Gentry used his own money to pay for the equipment of his troops. The women of Columbia stitched a large unit flag for Gentry's troops, which had symbols of the Stars and Stripes and patriotic slogans on it. On October 15, 1837, shortly before Richard Gentry left Columbia, he talked to his family physician and friend Dr. William Duncan who made a fateful prediction: "I fear this is our last meeting Richard. You are a brave man, but there is an element of rashness in you. If you are ever in battle you will lead the charge and be killed."

Richard Gentry and the Missouri Militia assembled at Jefferson Barracks, where Senator Thomas Hart Benton gave them a speech before sending them off. They then boarded onto steamboats and shipped down the Mississippi River until they reached New Orleans. The Missourians then embarked to Florida and landed at Tampa, where Gentry and his men were put under the command of U.S. Army officer (and future president) Zachary Taylor. Gentry and his troops were led by Zachary Taylor on a long march into South Florida to search for Seminoles. During the march south, Gentry and the Missourians were put in the advanced guard of Taylor's army to clear a path through the wilderness. On December 25, 1837, they located and attacked a large gathering of Seminoles led by Chief Abiaka on the northern shore of Lake Okeechobee, which began the Battle of Lake Okeechobee. Richard Gentry and the Missouri Militia were the first U.S. troops sent into battle, as Zachary Taylor ordered them to charge directly at the Seminole position. While leading his men, Gentry was shot in the stomach by the Seminole Indians, which made him collapse, and he died of his wounds shortly after the battle. The loss of Gentry caused the Missouri Militia troops to panic and made them ineffective for the rest of the battle.

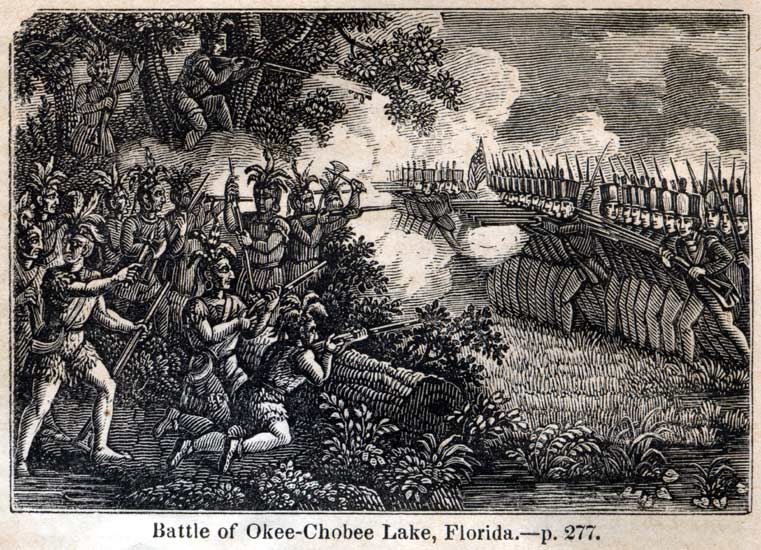
Engraving of the Battle of Lake Okeechobee

Weeks later, in January 1838, the news arrived from Florida that General Gentry had been killed by the Seminole Indians at Lake Okeechobee on Christmas Day, 1837. In 1839, Gentry's body was brought back to Missouri and reburied in Jefferson Barracks National Cemetery near St. Louis. One of Richard Gentry's sons, Nicholas Hawkins Gentry, would fight for the Confederacy in the American Civil War and died at the Battle of Wilson's Creek. Another of Richard Gentry's sons, Thomas Benton Gentry, would marry Mary Eliza Todd, a cousin of Mary Todd Lincoln. Richard Gentry's grandson North Todd Gentry would go on to be Missouri Attorney General and justice of the Supreme Court of Missouri.

== See also ==
- List of mayors of Columbia, Missouri
