= Franklin, Missouri =

- City
- Location of Franklin, Missouri
- Coordinates: 39°0′41″N 92°45′13″W
- Country: United States
- State: Missouri
- County: Howard

Area
  - Total: 0.24 sq mi (0.61 km^{2})
  - Land: 0.23 sq mi (0.60 km^{2})
  - Water: 0.0039 sq mi (0.01 km^{2})
- Elevation: 597 ft (182 m)

Population (2020)
  - Total: 70
  - Density: 303.1/sq mi (117.01/km^{2})
- Time zone: UTC-6 (Central (CST))
  - Summer (DST): UTC-5 (CDT)
- ZIP code: 65250
- Area code: 660
- FIPS code: 29-25624
- GNIS feature ID: 0718163

Franklin is a city in Howard County, Missouri, United States. It is located along the Missouri River in the central part of the state. Located in a rural area, the city had a population of 70 at the 2020 census. It is part of the Columbia, Missouri Metropolitan Statistical Area.

As the eastern terminus of the Santa Fe Trail, the community played a major role in the westward expansion of the United States.

== History ==
The town of Franklin was founded by European Americans in 1816 and named for Founding Father Benjamin Franklin of the United States. William Becknell, who is now known as the "Father of the Santa Fe Trail," lived on a farm a few miles northwest of Franklin. There was a spring near Becknell's property, Boone Lick Spring.

The spring had saline water and attracted people from St. Louis and points east, who came to distill the water for its salt. They came so often that they created a trail, calling it Boone's Lick Road. "Boone" refers to Nathan and Daniel Morgan Boone, sons of explorer Daniel Boone. The brothers first operated the saltlick business.

In 1821, William Becknell put a notice in the Missouri Intelligencer, announcing that he was organizing a party to go "westward, for the purpose of trading for horses and mules and catching wild animals of every description." On September 1, 1821, his party crossed the Missouri River at Arrow Rock and set out along what would become known in a few years as the Santa Fe Trail. There had long been trade along this way: years before the US acquired the Louisiana Purchase, the Chouteau family of St. Louis had been granted a fur trading monopoly with the Spanish at Santa Fe.

But the following year, Becknell searched for a path that would be wide enough for wagons and draft teams, to accommodate more trade. This improvement was integral to the growth of the Santa Fe Trail for use by both traders and the emigrants of the 1830s who moved on by various branches to the territories of the West: the future states of Oregon, California, and Washington.

In 1827, a devastating flood of the Missouri River destroyed much of Franklin. Residents rebuilt a short distance away on higher ground, creating New Franklin, Missouri.

The Cedar Grove was listed on the National Register of Historic Places in 1982.

=== Kit Carson ===
Born in Madison County, Kentucky, near the city of Richmond, Kit Carson migrated as a boy with his family to Franklin, where he was raised. Lindsey Carson was a farmer of Scots-Irish descent who had fought in the Revolutionary War under General Wade Hampton. He had a total of fifteen surviving children: five by his first wife, and ten by Rebecca Robinson, his second wife and Kit's mother. The Carson family settled on a tract of land owned by the sons of Daniel Boone, who had purchased the land from the Spanish during their brief period of rule here after the Seven Years' War. This was prior to the United States annexing the territory following its Louisiana Purchase of 1803 from France.

Carson was eight when his father was killed by a falling tree while clearing land. The father's death reduced the Carson family to a desperate poverty. Young Kit dropped out of school to work on the family farm, and to assist in hunting. At the age of 14, Kit was apprenticed to a saddlemaker (Workman's Saddleshop) in Franklin. The town was considered the eastern terminus of the Santa Fe Trail, which had opened two years earlier. Many of the customers at the saddleshop were trappers and traders, from whom Kit would hear stirring tales of the Far West. Carson is reported to have found working in the saddle shop to be suffocating: he once said "the business did not suit me, and I concluded to leave". Around 1826, aged 16, Kit secretly signed on with a large, merchant, Santa Fe-bound caravan in Franklin purportedly wagon-mastered by Stephen Turley and Jesse B. Turley, friends from nearby Lamine.

== Geography ==
Franklin is located at 39°0′41″N 92°45′13″W (39.011316, -92.753747). According to the United States Census Bureau, the city has a total area of 0.23 square miles (0.60 km^{2}), all land.

== Demographics ==
Historical population
Census	Pop.	Note	%±
1920	314		—
1930	346		10.2%
1940	325		−6.1%
1950	324		−0.3%
1960	355		9.6%
1970	252		−29.0%
1980	196		−22.2%
1990	181		−7.7%
2000	112		−38.1%
2010	95		−15.2%
2020	70		−26.3%
U.S. Decennial Census

=== 2010 census ===
As of the census of 2010, there were 95 people, 42 households, and 26 families residing in the city. The population density was 413.0 inhabitants per square mile (159.5/km^{2}). There were 52 housing units at an average density of 226.1 per square mile (87.3/km^{2}). The racial makeup of the city was 98.9% White and 1.1% African American. Hispanic or Latino of any race were 1.1% of the population.

There were 42 households, of which 28.6% had children under the age of 18 living with them, 47.6% were married couples living together, 9.5% had a female householder with no husband present, 4.8% had a male householder with no wife present, and 38.1% were non-families. 31.0% of all households were made up of individuals, and 14.3% had someone living alone who was 65 years of age or older. The average household size was 2.26 and the average family size was 2.88.

The median age in the city was 47.1 years. 24.2% of residents were under the age of 18; 3.2% were between the ages of 18 and 24; 22.1% were from 25 to 44; 36.8% were from 45 to 64; and 13.7% were 65 years of age or older. The gender makeup of the city was 53.7% male and 46.3% female.

=== 2000 census ===
As of the census of 2000, there were 112 people, 47 households, and 28 families residing in the city. The population density was 490.1 inhabitants per square mile (189.2/km^{2}). There were 53 housing units at an average density of 231.9 per square mile (89.5/km^{2}). The racial makeup of the city was 99.11% White, and 0.89% from two or more races. Hispanic or Latino of any race were 0.89% of the population.

There were 47 households, out of which 31.9% had children under the age of 18 living with them, 48.9% were married couples living together, 8.5% had a female householder with no husband present, and 38.3% were non-families. 34.0% of all households were made up of individuals, and 14.9% had someone living alone who was 65 years of age or older. The average household size was 2.38 and the average family size was 3.03.

In the city the population was spread out, with 27.7% under the age of 18, 5.4% from 18 to 24, 24.1% from 25 to 44, 32.1% from 45 to 64, and 10.7% who were 65 years of age or older. The median age was 39 years. For every 100 females, there were 86.7 males. For every 100 females age 18 and over, there were 88.4 males.

The median income for a household in the city was $28,542, and the median income for a family was $27,500. Males had a median income of $37,500 versus $21,250 for females. The per capita income for the city was $15,104. There were 16.7% of families and 20.8% of the population living below the poverty line, including 39.3% of under eighteens and 37.5% of those over 64.
