= List of defunct colleges and universities in Missouri =

The following is a list of defunct universities and colleges in Missouri. This list includes accredited, degree-granting institutions and bona fide institutions of higher learning that operated before accreditation existed. All had at least one location within the state of Missouri, and all have since discontinued operations or their operations were taken over by another similar institution of higher learning.

== Defunct colleges and universities in Missouri ==
- Arcadia College
- Baird College
- Blees Military Academy
- Brown Mackie College
- Central Bible College
- Central Female College
- Central Wesleyan College
- Clarksburg College
- Douglass University
- Finlay Engineering College
- George R. Smith College
- Hardin College and Conservatory of Music
- Hickey College (closed)
- Howard–Payne Junior College
- Kaplan University
- Kemper Military School
- Lenox Hall
- Lewis College
- Lincoln University School of Law
- Marillac College
- Marion College (Missouri)
- Masonic College
- Missouri Wesleyan College
- Pritchett College
- Will Mayfield College
- Missouri College
- Pritchett College
- Ruskin Colleges
- St. Charles College (Missouri)
- St. Joseph Female College
- Scarritt College
- Seminex
- Fulton Female Synodical College
- Tarkio College
- University of Phoenix
- Vatterott College
- Weaubleau Christian College
- Wentworth Military Academy and College
- Will Mayfield College
- Woman's Medical College of St. Louis
