= Pritchett =

Pritchett is a surname, and may refer to:

- Aaron Pritchett (born 1970), Canadian country music singer
- Bill Pritchett (1921–2014), Australian public servant
- Chris Pritchett (born 1970), American baseball player
- Florence Pritchett (1920–1965), American fashion editor, journalist, and radio and TV personality
- Henry Smith Pritchett (1857–1939), American astronomer
- Jamaal Pritchett (born 2003), American football player
- James Pritchett (actor) (1922–2011), American actor
- James Pritchett (footballer), football (soccer) player
- James Pigott Pritchett, York architect (1789-1868)
- James Pigott Pritchett junior, Darlington architect (1830-1911)
- John Pritchett (disambiguation), multiple people
- Kelvin Pritchett, American football player
- Lant Pritchett, American economist
- Marshall Pritchett (born 2006), American football player
- Matt Pritchett, British cartoonist
- Nehemiah Pritchett (born 2001), American football player
- Phil Pritchett, American musician
- Robert Taylor Pritchett (1828–1907), English gun manufacturer and artist
- Victor Sawdon Pritchett (1900–1997), British writer and critic
- Wendell Pritchett, American lawyer, legal scholar, professor, and university administrator
- Wes Pritchett (born 1966), American football player

== See also ==
- Pritchett, Colorado, United States, a statutory town
- Pritchett College, Glasgow, Missouri, United States (1866–1922)
