= Frances Porcher =

American writer and journalist (1853–1935)

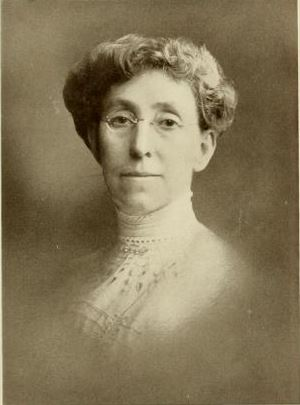
Frances Porcher, Kajiwara Photo

Frances Porcher (1853–1935) was an American writer and journalist.

== Ancestors ==
Frances Cannon Smith was originally from Virginia, and was a descendant from the Woodson who arrived in 1619 (or 1623), and settled finally in Goochland County, and from the Beckley, whose homestead was in King William County, near the house of the Carter-Braxtons. Porcher's great-great-grandfather, John J. Beckley, was elected Clerk of the House of the first United States Congress, which assembled in the city of New York, March 4, 1789, at the corner of Wall and Broad Streets, but which failed to secure the proper quorum (thirty members) until March 30. In those days the Clerk of the House was elected the same as the Speaker, and John Beckley served continuously until shortly before his death in 1807, with the exception of three years spent in assisting in the revision of the laws of Virginia.

Frances Cannon Smith was the daughter of John Woodson Smith, born in Cumberland County, Virginia, on May 17, 1819, and died in St. Louis on October 5, 1888. He was the son of Sarah Hatcher, daughter of Col. John Woodson, Cumberland County, Virginia, who was a lineal descendant of Dr. John Woodson, of noble English birth, who came to Virginia with Sir John Harvey in 1621; Dr. Woodson was a surgeon to a company of soldiers, bringing his wife with him. His second son, Robert, married Elizabeth Ferris of "Curies," a lineal descendant of the Dukes of Northumberland. From this marriage came Sarah Hatcher Woodson, fourth in line from Robert, a burgess active in colonial affairs.

John Woodson Smith was one of the original "Forty-Niners" who crossed the plains to California; a major in the Confederate army in Vicksburg during the siege and served until the close of the war. He married, on May 17, 1843, Mary Frances, daughter of Rev. Edward Cannon, an eminent Methodist minister of Virginia (niece of Gov. Cannon of Tennessee), and wife, Jane Lasley, granddaughter of John J. Beckley, a confrere of Richard Henry Lee and Carter Braxton, with whom he served in the Virginia Assembly before the war. He was clerk of the Senate and House of Delegates in Virginia 1777-86; clerk of the Committee for Courts of Justice and the Committee of Trade 1776; Alderman of Richmond 1782; served three years in Virginia High Court of Chancery; legislator for Virginia and clerk of the U. S. Senate, serving until his death in Washington 1807. He came from the Beckleys or Bickleys of Devonshire, as shown by the arms he used.

Byrd Smith, father of John Woodson, was born in Garrard County, Kentucky, on May 12, 1790, and died in Glasgow, Missouri, on February 12, 1872; he served in the war of 1812 and married, on June 17, 1818, Sarah Hatcher Woodson. His father, John Smith, born in Halifax County, Virginia, on June 23, 1764, and emigrated to Kentucky; he served there as Circuit Judge of the Pulaski District and in the legislature. He married in Virginia Mary Byrd. He was a son of Smith and wife, Mary English, and with his five sons served in the South Carolina campaign; at the battles of Eutaw Springs and Kings Mountain.

His great granddaughter, Frances Cannon Smith, born in Lynchburg, Virginia, in 1853, married, first, John Hall Roper; secondly, Thomas Davis Porcher, of Huguenot descent, from the Counts de Richebourg, a native of South Carolina, where his ancestor, Isaac Porcher (de Richebourg), settled 1680 with the Huguenot refugees from France. On the maternal side he was a great grandson of Stephen de Yeaux, who married Esther Giguillait; their only child, Stephen, married Anna Snowden, and their daughter, Georgianna Marie, married Octavius Theodore Porcher and had Thomas Davis Porcher.

The widow of Stephen de Veaux, Esther, married Robert Marion, brother of Gen. Francis Marion, and upon their death her son, Stephen, inherited the famous plantation Belle Isle, the family seat of the Marions, as well as the large estate of the De Yeaux, known as "De Veaux Neck." From Mary De Yaux, who married Gov Bullock of Georgia, came President Roosevelt.

== Biography ==
When Frances Cannon Smith was young, her family moved to Missouri. She was educated at Pritchett College, Glasgow, Missouri, of which, at that time, her uncle, the Rev. Carr Waller Pritchett Sr., was president. Porcher graduated at fifteen years, making the four years' course in two. Later she married a schoolmate, John Hale Roper, son of the Mayor of Glasgow, who died 4 years after, after which her newspaper work began, as the result of an accidental happening. Roper wrote a satirical take-off on some questions that were being asked in the columns of a local paper, and a friend who was connected with the St. Louis Star, took it down and showed it to the editor, Gilbert, formerly editor of the New York Morning Journal, who kept and published it, and inquired whether she had ever done any journalistic work. She was immediately put on the staff to do special and society articles, an so began her newspaper career.

Her career lasted until her marriage to Thomas Davis Porcher. She remained on The Star several years. "Dan" Reedy — the younger brother of William Marion Reedy — and Roper began their work about the same time. They were called the "kids" on "The Star" by the rest of the staff.

Sometime before this, Augustus Thomas, the dramatic writer, was on the daily papers where he had written a column a day for forty days about the St. Louis Exposition. Upon being assigned to the Exposition a couple of years later, Roper thought she could follow on his steps and she, too, wrote a column a day for forty days, in addition to her regular writing. This had negative consequences to her health.

She then changed her work and took charge of the advertising department of D. Crawford & Co., and the Swope Shoe Company, writing the advertisements of these firms for the newspapers, making contracts, and doing general newspaper work.

About 1890 M. Fanning and Galvin founded The Mirror. Fanning was an old newspaper man and wanted to bring out a new weekly paper, and suggested to Roper that she take a position on the staff of that paper, which she did, starting with the first issue, but keeping up her advertising work for D. Crawford & Co. This combination eventually netted her an income of about $3,000 ($107,500 in 2025 dollars) a year.

For The Mirror she wrote short stories, gave space to book reviews, dramatic criticisms and other departments each week. When Roper commenced her work on The Star, William Marion Reedy was the city editor. This was in 1888 or 1889. He gave her a great deal of encouragement, notably upon one occasion when she had written a political critique entitled Big Bugs' Ball, after the style of the Ingoldsby Legends.

Later Reedy became editor of The Mirror. After Fanning left St. Louis to go to Ohio, Dyer, who had been editor with Fanning, retired, and Reedy took the editorship and The Mirror Company was formed, with Le Berthon as business manager. Roper continued as Reedy's assistant until her marriage in July, 1896 — after which she contributed at varying intervals to The Mirror up to 1912.

She married Thomas Davis Porcher, born in Abbeville County, South Carolina and 16 years her younger, who was at the head of the book department of Stix, Baer & Fuller. they met he arrived from Chicago to open a book department for D. Crawford & Co. He then became superintendent of the book department of the Grand Leader Store. They had one son, Francis David Porcher, who attended the Virginia Military Institute at Lexington, Virginia. They lived at Stewart Place and later 5585 Bartmer Avenue, St. Louis.

In addition to The Mirror, Porcher contributed to the St. Louis Globe-Democrat, St. Louis Post-Dispatch and Republic; and to a few Eastern periodicals. While on The Mirror, Porcher wrote a few short stories; sometimes they were signed with her initials, but often no name was attached.

In 1913 she published a short story — Mr. Perryman's Christmas Eve.

When McCullagh was editor she wrote specials for the Globe-Democrat. McCullagh offered her to be in charge of a department that had been in charge of the Rev. Dr. Snyder, but he was not willing to allow her to continue her work on The Mirror at the same time. She refused and continued to write specials on intervals for McCullagh.

When she was doing the advertising work for D. Crawford & Co. She had her salary raised $260 ($9,317 in 2025 dollars) a year for writing a "saucy" letter. Crawford had seen the letter she had written to a solicitor and which was afterwards copied in a daily paper. That afternoon he called her in his office to say that she was worth $5 a week more to the firm. She was paid that amount for five years

During the Louisiana Purchase Exposition in 1904, a representative from the German Government asked to have one of her stories, The Color of Her Eyes, translated for a magazine in Berlin. She gave him permission to publish it and two years later she received a package with a brown leather purse or for cards, with the title of the story engraved into it.

She was an officer of the Jefferson Chapter of the Daughters of the American Revolution, a member of the Society of Social Hygiene and of the National Child Labor Committee, and one of the Auxiliary Board of the Society for the Prevention and Cure of Tuberculosis. She was a conservative suffragist.

Her husband, Thomas Davis Porcher, died on September 19, 1914, in St. Louis, Missouri. After this, she moved to Los Angeles, California. She died in 1935 and is buried with her husband at the DuBose Old Episcopal Cemetery in Willington, South Carolina.
