= Bernice Morrison =

American philanthropist

Bernice Morrison (sometimes Berenice Morrison) (1856–1947) was an American heiress and benefactor of the Morrison Observatory.

Morrison was born in St. Louis, Missouri to William M. Morrison and Sara Catherine "Kate" Swinney (The famous Paddle Wheeler "Kate Swinney" was named after her). After both of her parents died at an early age, she was raised by her maternal grandparents, Captain William Daniel Swinney and Lucy Ann Jones who owned a tobacco plantation in Glasgow, Missouri.

In 1874, she pledged $100,000 to Carr Waller Pritchett to build a world class telescope in Glasgow at the Pritchett Institute. The telescope and the Morrison Observatory were moved to nearby Fayette, Missouri during the early part of the 1930s. It stands there today as one of Central Missouri's hidden treasures as a fully functional piece of science history operated by Central Methodist University.
