= Uriel S. Hall =

American politician, lawyer and educator (1852–1932)

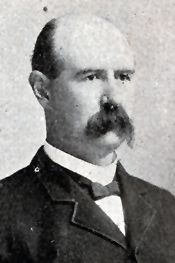
- Hall in 1896

Member of the U.S. House of Representatives from Missouri's 2nd district
- In office March 4, 1893 – March 3, 1897
- Preceded by: Charles H. Mansur
- Succeeded by: Robert N. Bodine

7th President of Pritchett College
- In office 1905–1917
- Preceded by: C. C. Hemenway
- Succeeded by: Oscar Dahlene

Personal details
- Born: Uriel Sebree Hall; April 12, 1852 Huntsville, Missouri, US
- Died: December 30, 1932 (aged 80) Columbia, Missouri, US
- Party: Democratic
- Relations: William Preble Hall (uncle); Frank P. Sebree (cousin); Uriel Sebree (cousin); Mordecai Oliver
- Parent: William A. Hall (father)
- Profession: Politician, lawyer, educator

Uriel Sebree Hall (April 12, 1852 – December 30, 1932) was an American politician, lawyer, and educator. A Democrat, he was a member of the United States House of Representatives from Missouri.

Born to a political family, Hall originally worked as an educator and a lawyer. He represented Missouri's 2nd district in the House from 1893 to 1897. From 1905 to 1917, he was president of Pritchett College.

== Biography ==
Hall was born on April 12, 1852, near Huntsville, Missouri, the son of William A. Hall. His uncle was William Preble Hall and his cousins were Frank P. Sebree and Uriel Sebree; he was related to Mordecai Oliver by his marriage. Educated by private tutors, he graduated from Huntsville's Mount Pleasant College in 1873 with a Bachelor of Arts.

Hall was then the school superintendent of Moberly, followed by the founder of a school in Prairie Hill. In 1879, he was admitted to the bar, after which he began practicing law in Moberly. In 1885, he became a farmer near Hubbard.

Hall was a Democrat. He was a member of the United States House of Representatives from March 4, 1893, to March 3, 1895, representing Missouri's 2nd district. He was not nominated for the following election. Ideologically, he leaned liberal. He supported income tax.

From 1905 to 1917, Hall was president of Pritchett College. In 1918, he moved to Columbia, where he founded the Hall West Point-Annapolis Coaching School – a feeder school of the United States Military Academy, serving as its head from 1918, until his retirement in May 1930.

Hall was married to Margaret Hollins Hall, with whom he had two daughters. He died on December 30, 1932, aged 80, in Columbia, from pmeumonia, and was buried at Oakland Cemetery, in Moberly.

U.S. House of Representatives
Preceded by Charles H. Mansur	Member of the U.S. House of Representatives from Missouri's 2nd congressional district 1893–1897	Succeeded by Robert N. Bodine
