= Armstead M. Alexander =

American politician (1834–1892)

Armstead Milton Alexander

Member of the United States House of Representatives
- In office March 4, 1883 – March 3, 1885
- Preceded by: James Henry McLean
- Succeeded by: John Blackwell Hale
- Constituency: Missouri's 2nd congressional district

Prosecuting Attorney of Monroe County, Missouri
- In office 1872–1876
- Preceded by: J. H. Hollister
- Succeeded by: Robert N. Bodine

Personal details
- Born: May 26, 1834 Winchester, Kentucky, US
- Died: November 7, 1892 (aged 58) Paris, Missouri, US
- Resting place: Walnut Grove Cemetery, Paris, Missouri, US
- Spouse: Sarah F. (“Sallie”) Vaughn (m. 1858)
- Children: 3
- Education: University of Virginia (attended)
- Profession: Attorney

Armstead Milton Alexander (Note: Sources variously spell Alexander's name as "Armstead" "Armsted" and "Armistead"; Armstead is used most often. He was usually referred to as A. M. Alexander.) (May 26, 1834 – November 7, 1892) was an American attorney and politician from Missouri who served as a member of the United States House of Representatives from 1883 to 1885.

A native of Winchester, Kentucky, Alexander's family moved to Paris, Missouri when he was seven years old. His father died in 1844, and Alexander was apprenticed as a blacksmith. After spending time in California during the gold rush, he attended the University of Virginia, studied law, and attained admission to the bar. He practiced in Paris, and as a slaveowner, he was initially sympathetic to the Confederacy at the start of the American Civil War, but he took the oath of loyalty to the Union in 1862.

Active in politics as a Democrat, Alexander attended numerous local, state, and national conventions as a delegate. A sought-after orator, he was frequently called upon to give convention nomination speeches and keynote addresses, as well as speaking at campaign events and holiday gatherings. He served as prosecuting attorney of Monroe County from 1872 to 1876. In 1882, he was a successful nominee for the United States House of Representatives, and he served from March 4, 1883, to March 3, 1885.

After leaving Congress, Alexander resumed practicing law in Paris. He died in Paris on November 7, 1892, and was buried at Walnut Grove Cemetery in Paris.

== Early life ==
Alexander was born in Winchester, Kentucky on May 26, 1834, a son of John Alexander and Elizabeth Jane (Ragland) Alexander. In 1841, the Alexander family moved to Paris, Missouri, and John Alexander died in 1844. Armstead Alexander attended the local schools and became an apprentice blacksmith. In 1849, he joined the California gold rush, and after returning to Paris, he became involved in several business ventures. He attended the University of Virginia from 1856 to 1857. Alexander later studied law, was admitted to the bar, and practiced in the Paris area. (Note: Some biographies indicate that Alexander attended Bethany College, but there are no contemporary references. The earliest mention is his 1928 Congressional biography.) (Note: Some biographies indicate that Alexander did not become an attorney until 1862 or 1870, but contemporary newspaper articles verify that he began practicing law no later than 1859, and probably in 1858.)

Alexander owned four slaves according to the 1860 census (Note: According to the census, the four enslaved persons were black, not mulatto, and included a 19 year old male, females who were 21 and 14, and a baby boy who was six months old.) and during the American Civil War, he initially expressed support for the Confederacy. In 1862 he was among the Paris attorneys reported to have taken the oath of loyalty to the United States. (Note: Later biographies report that Alexander served in the Confederate States Army and did not take the loyalty oath until 1881. But contemporary newspaper accounts make clear that he continued to practice law in Paris during the war, and that he signed the loyalty oath in 1862.) (Note: Some later news accounts refer to him as "colonel", but this appears to be confusing Alexander for another individual, Almerine M. Alexander, who was commander of a Confederate cavalry regiment from Texas.) In 1864, he was a member of the Monroe County committee that wrote to Clinton B. Fisk, the Union Army commander of the Department of North Missouri, to report that criminal and Confederate guerilla activity in the area had been curtailed, and that the county had met its most recent conscription levy.

== Early career ==
In addition to practicing law, Alexander farmed, and he was an active member of the Northeast Missouri Agricultural Society. he remained involved in business, and his interests included serving on the board of directors of the Hannibal and Central Missouri Railroad. A Democrat, he was a delegate to numerous local and state party conventions, including the 1868 Democratic state convention. In 1869, he was appointed secretary of the annual Monroe County Fair. In 1870, Alexander won election as Paris Town Attorney. In 1871, Alexander was considered for a vacant judgeship on the Missouri Circuit Courts, but was not appointed. Also in 1871, Alexander began the first of several terms as president of the Paris school board.

Alexander served as prosecuting attorney for Monroe County from 1872 through 1876, and was a delegate to the 1875 Missouri Constitutional Convention. He was long active in the Independent Order of Odd Fellows, and in 1873 was elected head of the Missouri lodge. In August 1874, he was elected temporary chairman of the state Democratic convention. In September 1875, he was appointed to the board of regents of the First District Normal School (now Truman State University) in Kirksville. He served as a regent until 1882, when he resigned after being nominated for Congress.

== Continued career ==
In April 1876, Alexander was again an applicant for a vacant judgeship, but was not selected. In May 1876, he was mentioned as a candidate for governor, but did not run; he was a candidate for the 1876 Democratic nomination for the United States House of Representatives, but was not nominated. Alexander was also a delegate to the 1876 Democratic National Convention. In June 1877, Alexander was the commencement speaker at the normal school in Kirksville, and presented diplomas to the graduates.

In 1880, Alexander was a candidate for the Democratic nomination in Missouri's 13th congressional district, and lost to incumbent Aylett H. Buckner. After redistricting following the 1880 census, in 1882 Alexander won the Democratic nomination to represent Missouri's 2nd congressional district in the United States House of Representatives, defeating several other candidates on the nominating convention's 341st ballot. He won the general election in November, and served one term, March 4, 1883, to March 3, 1885. During his term, Alexander served on the Committee on Territories and the Committee on Mines and Mining. Alexander achieved a legislative success when he secured passage of an amendment to the Edmunds Act which was intended to prevent secret, polygamous marriages after Utah attained statehood. In another success, he worked with Representative Alexander Graves to defeat a proposal by Representatives William H. Hatch and James N. Burnes that would have divided Missouri's federal judicial districts to create courts in Hannibal and St. Joseph. He was an unsuccessful candidate for renomination in 1884.

== Later career ==
After leaving Congress, Alexander resumed practicing law in Paris. In August 1886, he was a delegate to the state Democratic convention. In June 1888, he was a delegate to the convention that nominated the Democratic candidate for the Missouri Senate from the district that included Monroe County. In August 1888, he was a delegate to the party's Congressional district nominating convention, and was selected to serve as temporary chairman.

In 1889, Governor David R. Francis appointed Alexander to the committee organized to advocate and plan for a world's fair in St. Louis, which culminated in the 1904 Louisiana Purchase Exposition. In January 1890, he was appointed to the board of trustees of the Female Orphan School in Fulton, Missouri, now William Woods University. In June 1890, he was a delegate to the Democratic nominating convention that selected James Brinton Gantt as a candidate for the Supreme Court of Missouri. In October 1891, Governor Francis appointed Alexander as his Congressional district's delegate to the National Farmers' Congress held at Sedalia, Missouri, which proposed legislation intended to improve American agriculture. In July 1892, he was chosen as a delegate to the state Democratic convention.

Alexander died in Paris on November 7, 1892. He was interred at Walnut Grove Cemetery in Paris.

== Notes ==
U.S. House of Representatives
Preceded by James Henry McLean	Member of the U.S. House of Representatives from Missouri's 2nd congressional district 1883–1885	Succeeded by John Blackwell Hale
