= James Henry McLean =

American politician (1829–1886)

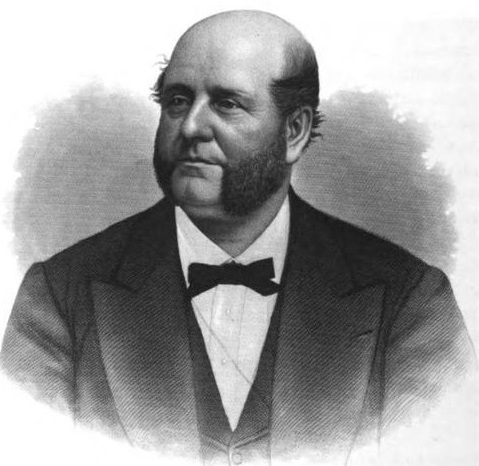

Member of the U.S. House of Representatives from Missouri's 2nd district
- In office December 15, 1882 – March 3, 1883
- Preceded by: Thomas Allen
- Succeeded by: Armstead M. Alexander

Personal details
- Born: August 13, 1829 Ayrshire, Scotland
- Died: August 12, 1886 (aged 56) Dansville, New York, U.S.
- Resting place: Bellefontaine Cemetery, St. Louis, Missouri, U.S.
- Party: Republican

James Henry McLean (August 13, 1829 – August 12, 1886) was a U.S. representative from Missouri.

== Biography ==
Born in Ayrshire, Scotland, McLean was raised in Nova Scotia, Canada, where his father was manager of the Albion Mining Company. Having begun studying medicine with the mining company's resident physician, in 1842 he accepted $200 from his father, intending to sail to the United States and pursue a career in the medical field. He stayed aboard ship so he could visit Bermuda, then lived in Boston before settling in Philadelphia, Pennsylvania, in 1842. McLean secured a position as a clerk in a drug store, and continued to learn the medical profession, including courses at the University of Pennsylvania.

McLean was briefly employed as a clerk for a mining company in Minersville. In 1849 he moved to St. Louis, Missouri, where he made a profit in the sale of building lots and he began a career in the patent medicine business as a partner in a venture to distribute a medicine, George A. Westbrook's "Mexican Mustang Liniment", which was touted as being for man, horse, and other beasts.

In 1850, he moved to New Orleans, Louisiana, where his success at turning a profit by purchasing and then re-selling the only supply of turpentine then available in the city led to his taking charge of finances for the Narciso López expedition that attempted to liberate Cuba from control of Spain.

In 1851, McLean returned to St. Louis to continue his studies, and he resumed his work in patent medicine as the creator and distributor of "Dr. McLean's Volcanic Oil Liniment", a product that placed him in competition and caused controversy with his former partner in the "Mexican Mustang Liniment" venture. He graduated from the St. Louis Medical College in 1863, and continued expansion of his business enterprises, a monthly newspaper and almanacs. Sales of his patent medicines, including "McLean's Strengthening Cordial and Blood Purifier", were so successful that he employed an international sales force, and operated fleets of wagons, ships and railroad cars to facilitate their distribution.

Mclean was elected as a Republican to the Forty-seventh Congress to fill the vacancy caused by the death of Thomas Allen and served from December 15, 1882, to March 3, 1883. During his career Mclean patented several inventions, including a dredging machine. In the early 1880s McLean patented an early version of the machine gun, which did not prove viable. As a devout Methodist, he opposed violence, and hoped that weapons capable of mass killing would prove to be so terrible that nations would be discouraged from going to war.

== Death ==
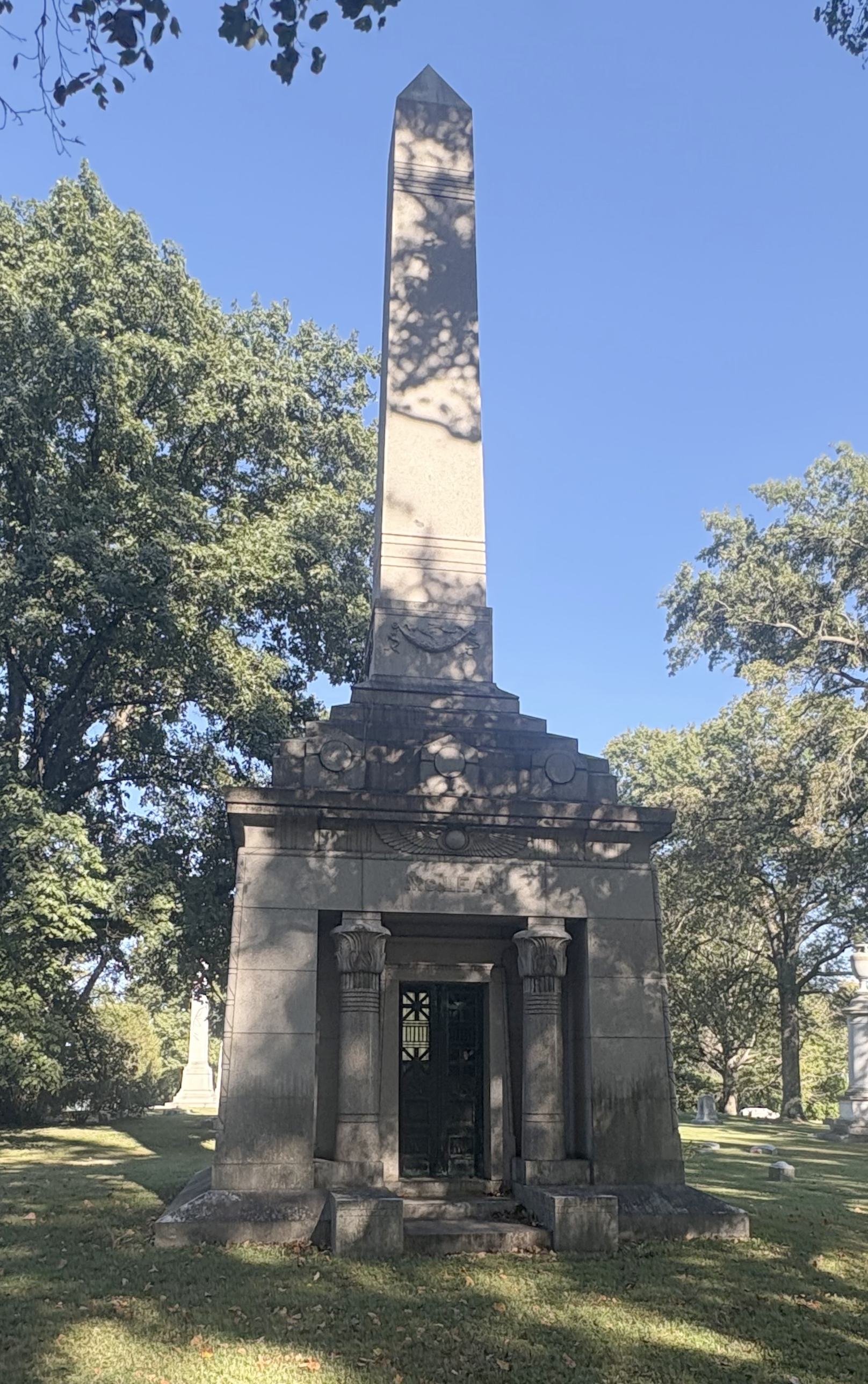
McLean mausoleum at Bellefontaine Cemetery

McLean died in Dansville, New York on August 12, 1886, the day before his 57th birthday. He was buried at Bellefontaine Cemetery in St. Louis, Missouri.

== Sources ==
- United States Congress. "James Henry McLean (id: M000548)". Biographical Directory of the United States Congress.
- James Henry McLean in Saint Louis: The Future Great City of the World. L. U. Reavis. 1876. Pages 705–707.
- Fike, Richard E. 1987. The Bottle Book: A Comprehensive Guide to Historic, Embossed Medicine Bottles. Peregrine Smith Books, Salt Lake City.
- Wilson, Rex L. 1981. Bottles on the Western Frontier. The University of Arizona Press, Tucson.
- New York Daily Tribune. April 26, 1873. Advertisement for Mexican Mustang Liniment.

U.S. House of Representatives
Preceded by Thomas Allen	Member of the U.S. House of Representatives from Missouri's 2nd congressional district December 15, 1882 – March 3, 1883	Succeeded by Armstead M. Alexander
