= Anthony Bryk =

American educational researcher

Anthony S. Bryk is an American educational researcher and served as the ninth president of the Carnegie Foundation for the Advancement of Teaching.

== Biography ==
Bryk earned his B.S. from Boston College and his Ed.D. from the Harvard Graduate School of Education. Before becoming president of the Carnegie Foundation for the Advancement of Teaching in 2008, he held the Spencer Chair in Organizational Studies in the Stanford Graduate School of Education and the Stanford Graduate School of Business. Before joining the Stanford faculty in 2004, he was the Marshall Field IV Professor of Urban Education at the University of Chicago, where he co-founded the Center for Urban School Improvement. He has been a member of the National Academy of Education since 1994, and he was elected as a member of the American Academy of Arts and Sciences in 2011.
