= Henry Smith Pritchett =

American astronomer and educator

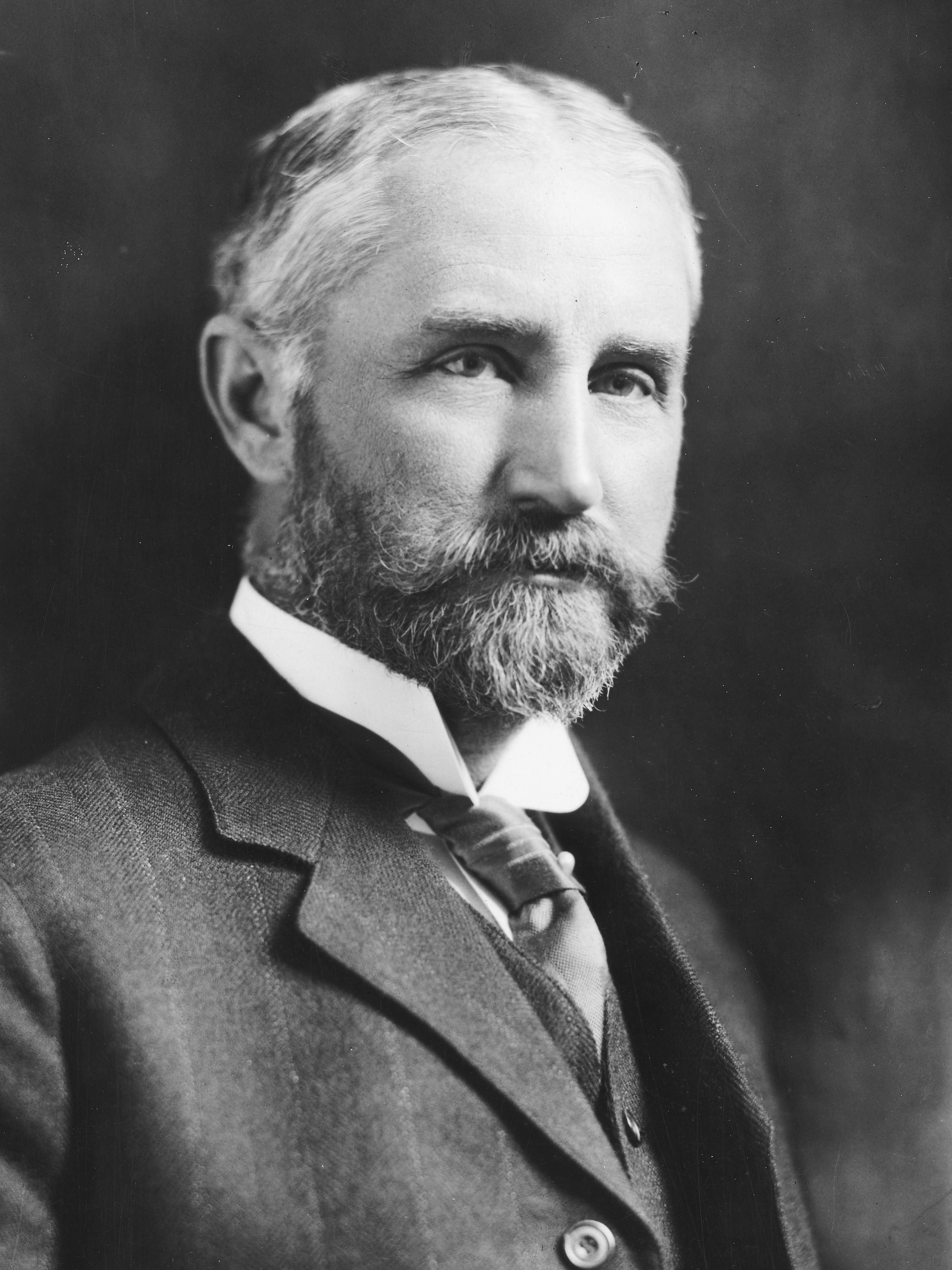
- Pritchett circa 1911

5th President of the Massachusetts Institute of Technology
- In office 1900–1907
- Preceded by: James Crafts
- Succeeded by: Arthur Amos Noyes (acting)

9th Superintendent of the U.S. Coast and Geodetic Survey
- In office December 1, 1897 – November 30, 1900
- Preceded by: William Ward Duffield
- Succeeded by: Otto Hilgard Tittmann

Personal details
- Born: April 16, 1857 Fayette, Missouri, U.S.
- Died: August 28, 1939 (aged 82) Santa Barbara, California, U.S.
- Education: Pritchett College

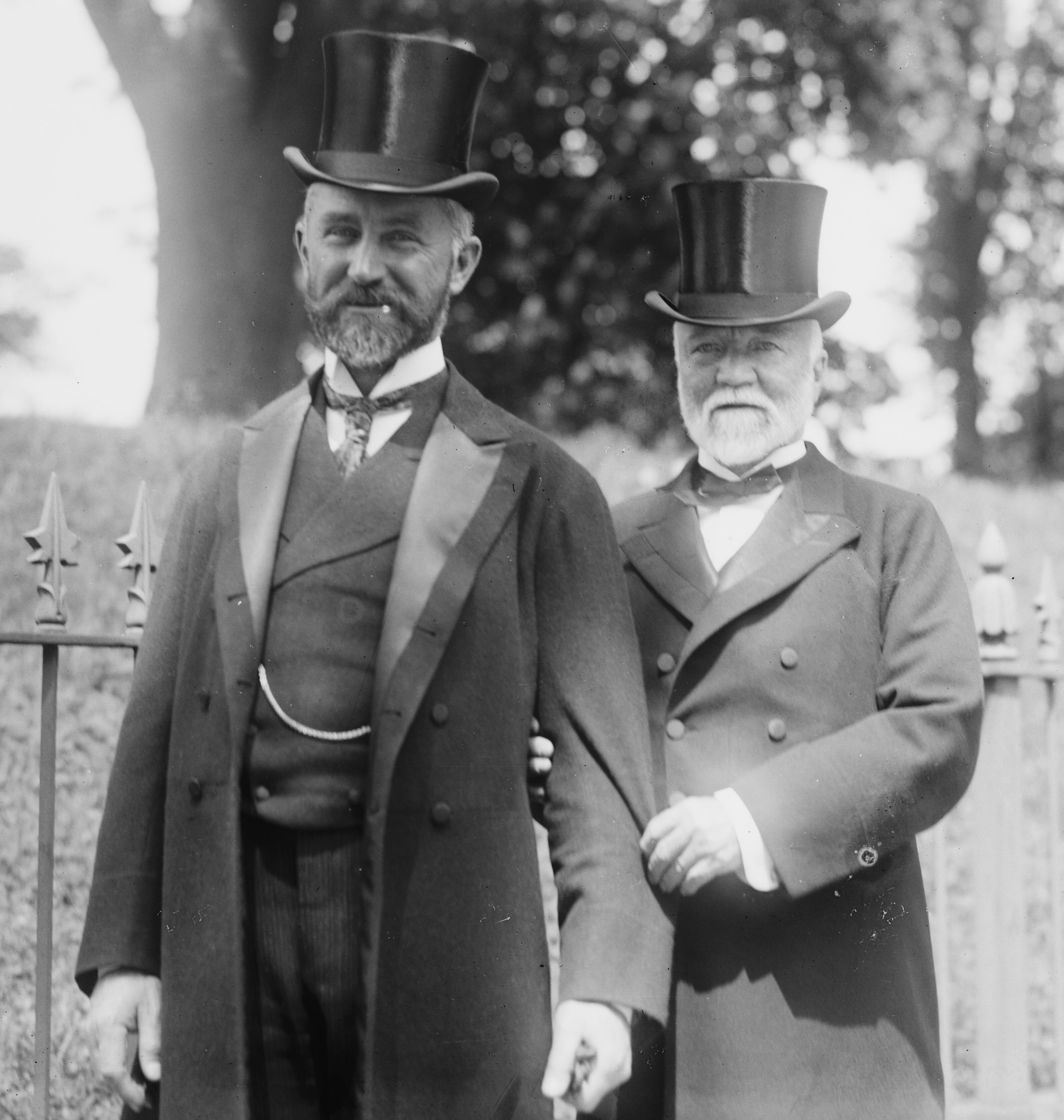
Pritchett and Carnegie c. 1908

Henry Smith Pritchett (16 April 1857 in Fayette, Missouri, USA – 28 August 1939 in Santa Barbara, California, USA) was an American astronomer, university president and philanthropist.

== Biography ==
Pritchett was born on April 16, 1857, in Fayette, Missouri, the son of Carr Waller Pritchett, Sr., and attended Pritchett College in Glasgow, Missouri, receiving an A.B. in 1875.

He then took instruction from Asaph Hall for two years at the US Naval Observatory after which he was made an assistant astronomer. In 1880, he returned to Glasgow to take a position at the Morrison Observatory, where his father Carr Waller Pritchett, Sr. was director. He served as an astronomer on the Transit of Venus Expedition to New Zealand in 1882. When he returned in 1883, he took an appointment as professor of mathematics and astronomy and director of the observatory at Washington University in St. Louis. In the early 1890s he studied in Germany, where he obtained a PhD from the Ludwig-Maximilians-Universität München in 1894. He was Superintendent of the United States Coast and Geodetic Survey from 1897 to 1900. In 1899, he was elected to the American Philosophical Society.

Pritchett served as the president of the Massachusetts Institute of Technology (MIT) from 1900 to 1906.

Pritchett was elected to the American Academy of Arts and Sciences in 1901.

Pritchett was elected a member of the American Antiquarian Society in 1902. Pritchett later resigned, though the reasons and timing are unclear.

He was president of the Carnegie Foundation for the Advancement of Teaching (CFAT) from 1906 until he retired in 1930. His principal accomplishment while with the CFAT was the institution of a fully funded pension program (the Teachers Insurance and Annuity Association, TIAA) in 1918.

He also served as the first president of the National Society for the Promotion of Industrial Education (1907). He had a long involvement with the Carnegie Endowment for International Peace, and served as a trustee for Carnegie Institute for Science.

He died on August 28, 1939, in Santa Barbara, California.

== Legacy ==
Pritchett Lounge, on the second floor of the Walker Memorial building at MIT, is named in his honor.

Government offices
Preceded by William Ward Duffield	9th Superintendent, United States Coast and Geodetic Survey; 1897–1900	Succeeded by Otto Hilgard Tittmann
Academic offices
Preceded by James Crafts	5th President of the Massachusetts Institute of Technology; 1900 – 1907	Succeeded by Richard Cockburn Maclaurin
