= Glasgow Public Library =

- U.S. National Register of Historic Places
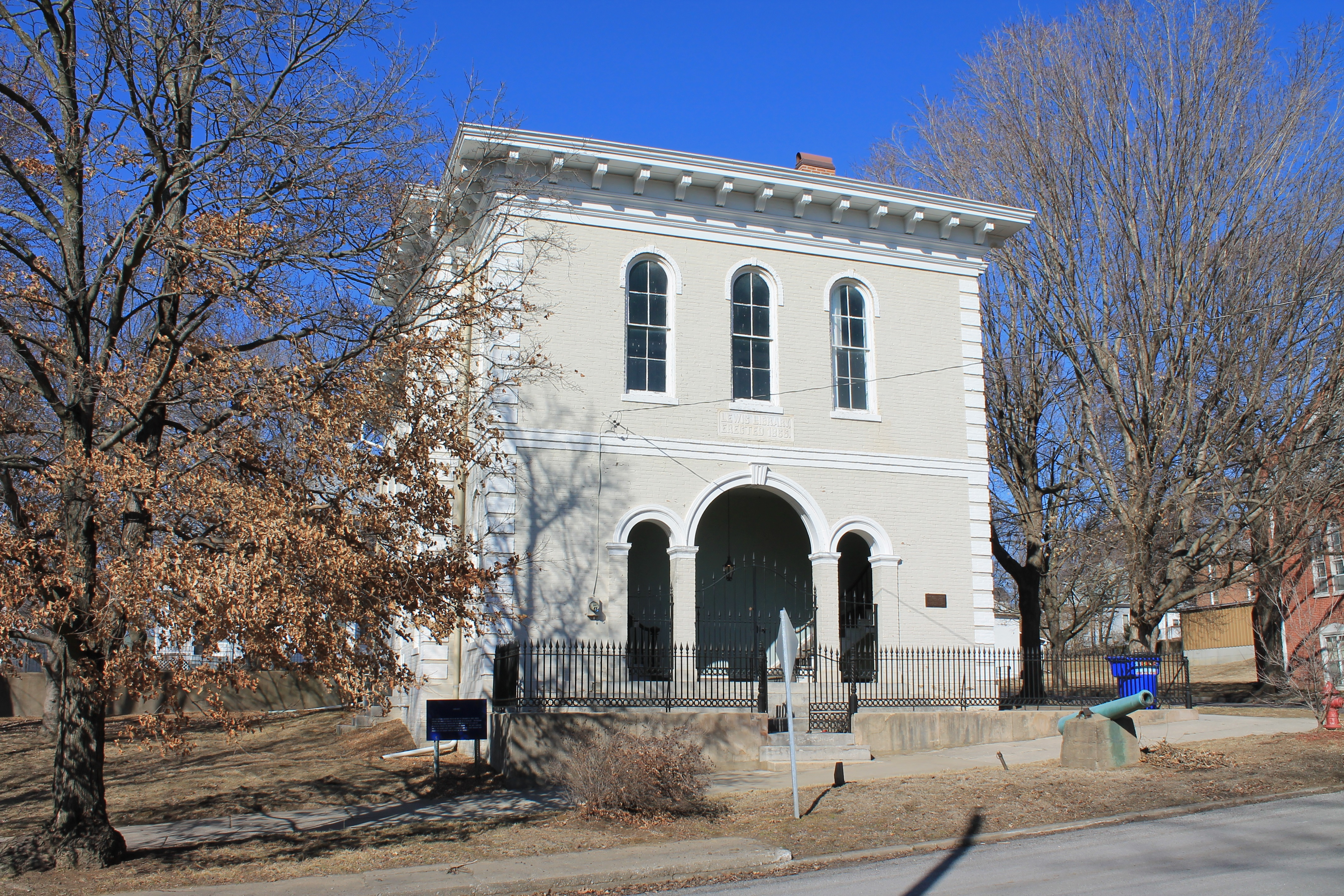
- Glasgow Public Library, March 2015

- Location within Missouri Location within the United States
- Location: NW corner Market and 4th Sts., Glasgow, Missouri
- Coordinates: 39°13′34″N 92°50′36″W
- Area: less than one acre
- Built: 1866
- Architect: Aldridge, John
- Architectural style: Italianate
- NRHP reference No.: 69000106
- Added to NRHP: May 21, 1969

Glasgow Public Library, also known as Lewis Library, is a historic library building located at Glasgow, Howard County, Missouri. It was built in 1866, and is a two-story, Italianate style brick building. It features round-arched windows and doors, and a high bracketed cornice with its broad overhanging roof. It is the oldest Missouri library in continuous use. It was originally constructed and used by the now defunct, Lewis College, and was listed on the National Register of Historic Places in 1969.
