= Otto Hilgard Tittmann =

American geodesist, geographer and astronomer

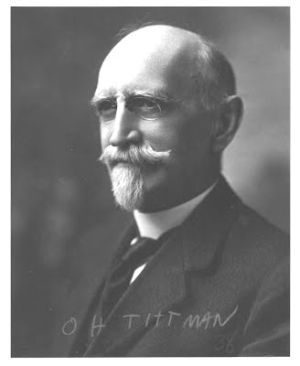

Superintendent of the U.S. Coast and Geodetic Survey
- In office December 1, 1900 – April 24, 1914
- Preceded by: Henry Smith Pritchett
- Succeeded by: Ernest Lester Jones

Personal details
- Born: August 20, 1850; Belleville, Illinois
- Died: February 14, 1938 (aged 87); Leesburg, Virginia
- Parent(s): Edward Tittmann, Rosa Hilgard
- Occupation: Geodesist
- Known for: Co-founder of the National Geographic Society

Otto Hilgard Tittmann (August 20, 1850 – August 21, 1938) was an American geodesist, geographer, and astronomer of German descent.

== Biography ==
Tittmann was born in 1850, in Belleville, Illinois to revolutionary parents fleeing the aftermath of the 1848 revolutions. He attended school in St. Louis, and in 1867 joined the United States Coast Survey. In 1874 he was assistant astronomer in Japan to view the Transit of Venus and from 1889 until 1893 he was in charge of weights and measures. In 1888 he co-founded the National Geographic Society. In 1899, Tittmann served as president of the Philosophical Society of Washington. And, from 1895 until 1900 he was assistant in charge of the United States Coast and Geodetic Survey. He was elected to the American Philosophical Society in 1906. From 1900 until 1915 he was Superintendent of the Survey, and from 1915 until 1919 he was president of the National Geographic Society. He died in Leesburg, Virginia, in 1938.

Government offices
Preceded by Henry Smith Pritchett	Superintendent, United States Coast and Geodetic Survey; 1900–1915	Succeeded by Ernest Lester Jones
