= Ernest Lester Jones =

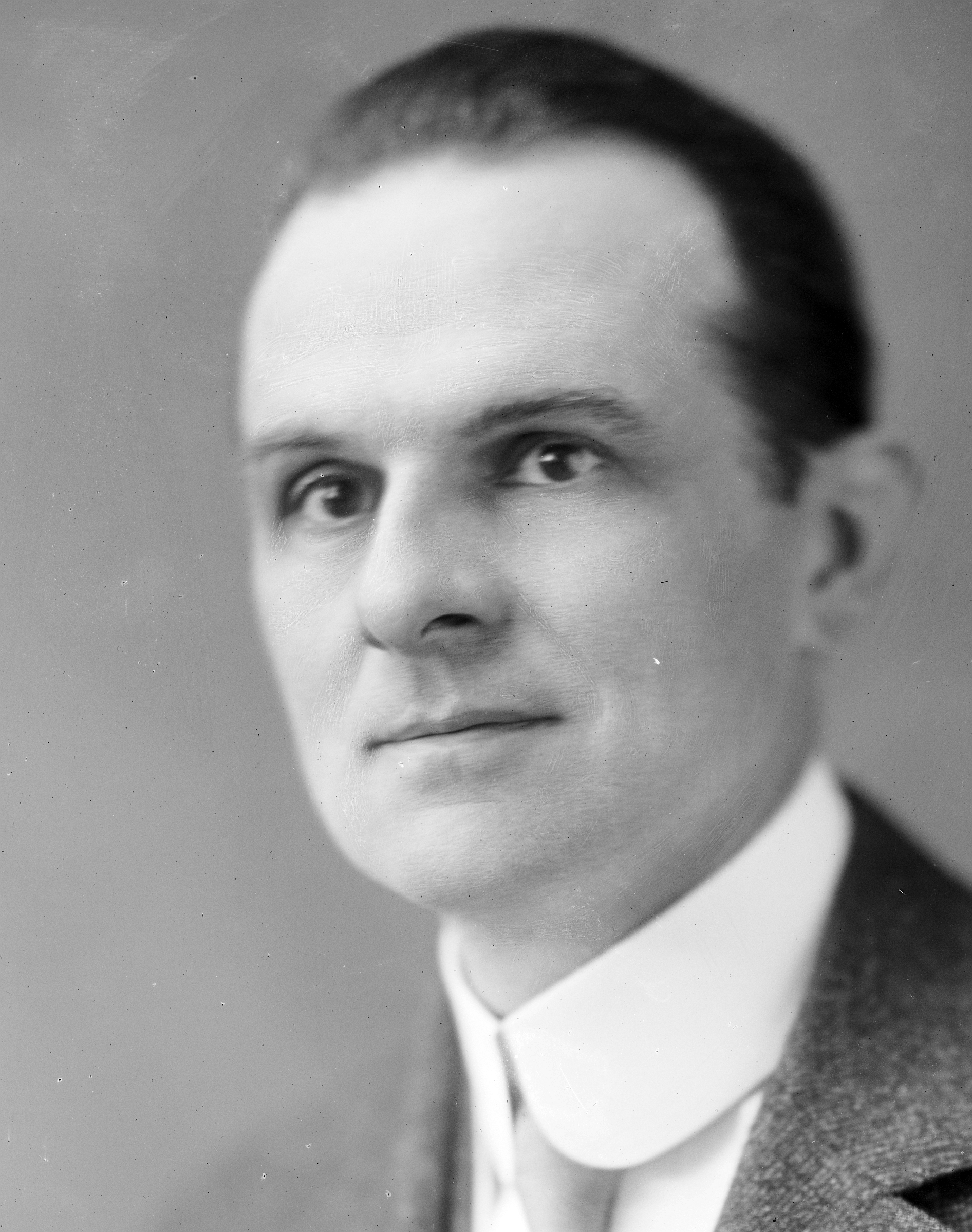

Superintendent of the U.S. Coast and Geodetic Survey
- In office 1915–1929
- Preceded by: Otto Hilgard Tittmann
- Succeeded by: Raymond Stanton Patton

Personal details
- Born: April 14, 1876 East Orange, New Jersey
- Died: April 9, 1929 (aged 52) Washington D.C.
- Education: Newark Academy
- Alma mater: Princeton University
- Occupation: engineer

Colonel Ernest Lester Jones (April 14, 1876 – April 9, 1929) was born in East Orange, New Jersey and was commissioned a hydrographic and geodetic engineer. In addition to extended study abroad, he held an A. B. degree and an honorary A. M. degree conferred by Princeton University.

Colonel Jones was for 14 years the directing head of the United States Coast and Geodetic Survey (USC&GS) and in that capacity used his talent and energy to promote scientific work and investigation. Much of the increased activity and interest in hydrography, geodesy, seismology, and terrestrial magnetism may be traced directly to his influence.

Colonel Jones had a long and notable career. Early in his Washington experience, he achieved recognition through his leadership in the settling of the Alaska boundary dispute between the United States and Canada. He was appointed head of the Coast and Geodetic Survey in 1915. In addition to his work with that body, he was a member of a number of important government and scientific missions. He served as a delegate to the International Geographic Survey of 1928, at Cambridge, England, where he delivered an address that was translated into many languages and printed in periodicals all over the world.

Colonel Jones inaugurated the movement that eventually ended in the organization of the American Legion. He was its first post and first department commander and was also instrumental in the formation of the Legion abroad. Through his influence in its work, he secured positions for thousands of veterans of the World War I.

Colonel Jones was an enthusiastic member of the Society of American Military Engineers, and rendered valuable services both to the Washington post and to the national organization. He served as Vice-President of the Post in 1924, and as a member of the Board of Directors of the National Society in 1925, 1926, and 1928.

== Career ==
Ernest Lester Jones, the son of Charles Hopkins and Ida (Lester) Jones was born in East Orange, New Jersey on April 14, 1876, and was a descendant of Mayflower passenger William Brewster. He received his educational training at the High School in Orange, New Jersey and at Newark Academy. Later he matriculated to Princeton University in the Class 1898, from which institution he received the Bachelor of Arts Degree.

On September 28, 1897, he was married to Virginia Brent Fox, of Louisville, Kentucky.

Following the completion of his studies at Princeton University, Mr. Jones was engaged in research, secretarial work, and business for a number of years. Early in 1913 he entered the service of the United States Government. President Wilson having appointed him Deputy Commissioner of the United States Bureau of Fisheries. He remained in this position until April 14, 1915, when he became Superintendent (title changed to Director in 1919) of the United States Coast and Geodetic Survey, which position he held until his death.

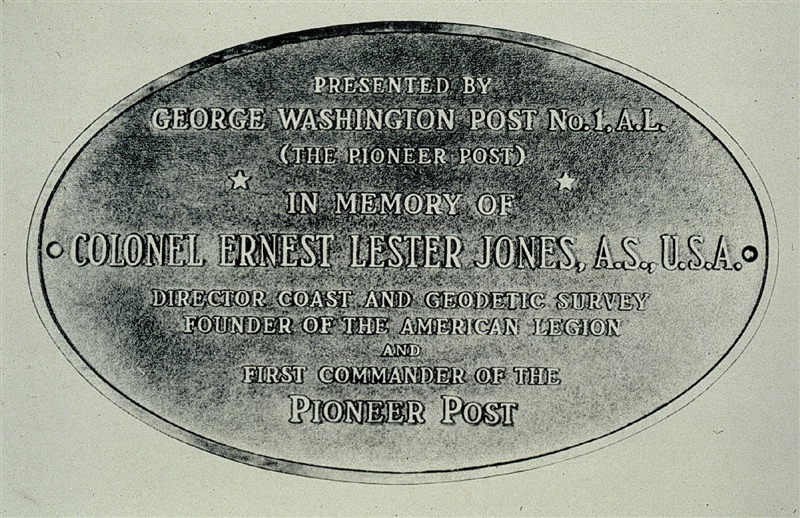
Commemorative plaque in honor of Jones from George Washington Post No. 1 of the American Legion stating his role in founding the American Legion. The plaque was placed on the United States Coast and Geodetic Survey auxiliary survey vessel USC&GS E. Lester Jones (ASV-79) in 1939.

During his residence in Washington, D.C., Colonel Jones served in the District of Columbia Militia, from private to major. During a portion of 1918 and 1919 he was on furlough from the Coast and Geodetic Survey, and was commissioned a lieutenant colonel in the U.S. Signal Corps. Later, he became Colonel, Division of Military Aeronautics, and served with the American forces in France in World War I. For exceptional services during the war period he was decorated by the King of Italy as Officer of the Order of S.S. Maurizio and Lazzaro, and Fatigue de Guerre (Italy); he was also an Officer of the Legion of Honor (France). Immediately following the cessation of the war, when men's minds everywhere were turned toward matters of rehabilitation, Colonel Jones was among the first to consider the welfare of those who had been at the battle front in Europe and thus it came about that he was the organizer of the first post of the American Legion (George Washington Post, Washington, D.C.), and also an organizer and incorporator of the National Legion.

As the administrator of a Federal Bureau, Colonel Jones saw the need for better conditions and more adequate salaries for employees in the Federal Service, and his advocacy in bringing these needs to the attention of the proper authorities helped to secure remedial legislation. Colonel Jones argued in congress for the establishment of a commissioned officer corps, the precursor to today's NOAA Commissioned Corps.

As Director of the Coast and Geodetic Survey, Colonel Jones supported providing the Bureau's engineers with updated ships, instruments, and equipment. These changes were intended to improve the Bureau's operations and the work of its personnel.

Throughout his administration of the Bureau, Colonel Jones was recognized for high executive ability, his loyalty to the work of the organization and to his associates and subordinates, as well as their loyalty toward him.

In addition to his duties as Director of the Coast and Geodetic Survey, Colonel Jones was also Commissioner of the International Boundary between the United States and Canada and Alaska and Canada, from February 1921 until his death. He was a member of the Aerial Patrol Commission of the United States, and a member of a number of Government and scientific missions, one of the last of which was a delegate to the International Geographic Congress in Cambridge, England in 1928.

His death was attributed to the effects of his war service as a colonel in the division of military aeronautics in France and Italy (where he was decorated by King Victor Emanuel). He was badly gassed and had been receiving treatment for the last 10 years of his life.

== Memberships ==
Colonel Jones was a member of a large number of organizations and societies, which included scientific, engineering, social, patriotic, and outdoor recreations purposes, showing thereby a wide range of active human interest of usefulness.

Among the organizations of which he was an active member may be mentioned in the Washington Academy of Sciences; the Philosophical Society of Washington; the American Association for the Advancement of Science, Washington Society of Engineers; the National Geographic Society; the Meteorological Society; the American Fisheries Society; the National Association of Audubon Societies; the Society of American Military Engineers; the Military Order of the World War; and the General Society of Mayflower Descendants.

Colonel Jones was elected an Associate Member of the American Society of Civil Engineers on April 3, 1922, and a member on October 12, 1925.

His membership in various clubs and civic organizations, also eloquent evidence of his wide interest in his fellow man, included the National Press Club, the Explorers Club (New York), the Aero Club of America, and Cosmos Club, and the Federal Club.

== Works ==
He was the author of the following Government publications: "Alaska Investigations", "Hypsometry", Elements of Chart Making", Safeguard the Gateways of Alaska", Earthquake Investigations in the United States", and The Neglected Waters of the Pacific". In addition, he also was the author of the following (unofficial) papers: "Evolution of the National Chart", Science and the Earthquake Perils", and "Aerial Surveying".

== Honorary degree ==
In 1919, he was granted the honorary degree of Master of Arts from Princeton University with the following citation:

"Ernest Lester Jones, Director, United States Coast and Geodetic Survey, the oldest scientific agency of our Government, writer on our coastal waterways bordering the Pacific Ocean, a resourceful administrator, increasing largely our supply of reliable maps and supervising the use of new devices for making our waters safer, notably by detecting the perilous submerged pinnacle rocks; a Colonel in the Army during the war, on active service in France and Italy, decorated by the King of Italy, awarded the Diploma of Merit by the Aerial League of America, recommended for the French Croix de Guerre; most recently instrumental in helping to form the American Legion to perpetuate American Liberty."

== Commemoration ==
The United States Coast and Geodetic Survey auxiliary survey vessel USC&GS E. Lester Jones (ASV-79), in service from 1940 to 1967, was named for Jones.

== Sources ==
Government offices
Preceded by Otto Hilgard Tittmann	Superintendent, United States Coast and Geodetic Survey; 1915–1919	Succeeded by none
Military offices
Preceded by none	Director, United States Coast and Geodetic Survey; 1919–1929	Succeeded by Raymond Stanton Patton
