= Allie Luse Dick =

American music educator (1859–1933)

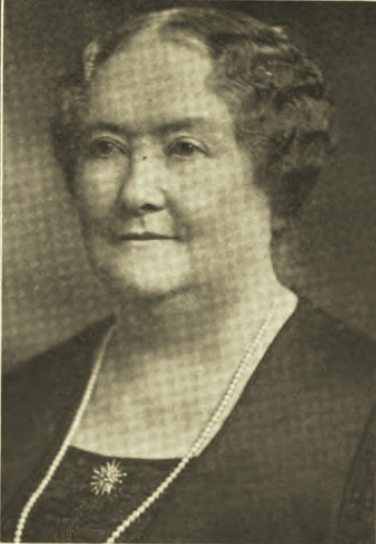
- Born: Alviola May Luse; June 2, 1859; Clyde, Ohio, U.S.
- Died: June 10, 1933 (aged 74); Pasadena, California, U.S.
- Education: Oberlin College; Oberlin Conservatory of Music; Albion College; Rhode Island School of Design; Howard Female College
- Occupations: music educator; music director
- Employers: Wesleyan College; Hedding College; Missouri Wesleyan College
- Spouse: Samuel Medary Dick (m. 1888)

Allie Luse Dick (née, Luse; June 2, 1859 - June 10, 1933) was an American music educator who identified with various religious, social, philanthropic and educational activities. Among the positions she held, Dick served as director of music at Hedding College, 1887–88, and again at Missouri Wesleyan College, 1892-95.

== Early life and education ==
Alviola (nicknames: "Allie", or less often, "Alice") May Luse was born at Clyde, Ohio, June 2, 1859. Her parents were John Wylie Luse, M. D., and Elizabeth Patterson Luse. She had three younger siblings: Luella Gertrude Luse, Minnie Marion Luse, and Llewellyn Fay Luse.

She graduated from Clyde high school, 1875, before becoming a student at Oberlin College and Oberlin Conservatory of Music (1876–78). In voice, she was a pupil of Emma Diruf Seiler (1821-1887), Philadelphia, and Charles R. Adams, Boston. In piano, she studied with William Hall Sherwood. She was also a student in art at Albion College, Rhode Island School of Design, and the Worcester Art Museum, as well as studying under private teachers. Dick was awarded an M. A. degree from Howard Female College, 1886.

== Career ==
Dick was a teacher of voice at the Wesleyan College, Macon, Georgia, 1882-85. She served as director of music at Hedding College, 1887–88, and at Missouri Wesleyan College, 1892-95.

Dick was a member of the Rhode Island Woman's club, Providence, Rhode Island; Worcester Woman's club; Minneapolis Woman's club; vice president, Thursday Musicale, Buchanan Bible Study club; president, Ladies' Shakespeare club; vice president, Lynnhurst Travel club; Republican Women's club; Colonial chapter, Daughters of the American Revolution (D. A. R.); vice regent, Minnesota D. A. R.; district president, Woman's Foreign Missionary Society of the Methodist Episcopal Church; conference president, Woman's Home Missionary society, Methodist Episcopal Church. She was active in the Red Cross during World War I, and as organizer and director, Blue Cross Young Woman's society for work among orphans in France. Dick was also active in church work leadership.

== Personal life ==
On June 28, 1888, at Clyde, Ohio, she married Rev. Samuel Medary Dick, Methodist Episcopal clergyman.

In religion, she was Methodist. Dick favored woman suffrage.

Alviola May Luse Dick died in Pasadena, California, June 10, 1933.
