= Charles H. Mansur =

American lawyer and politician (1835–1895)

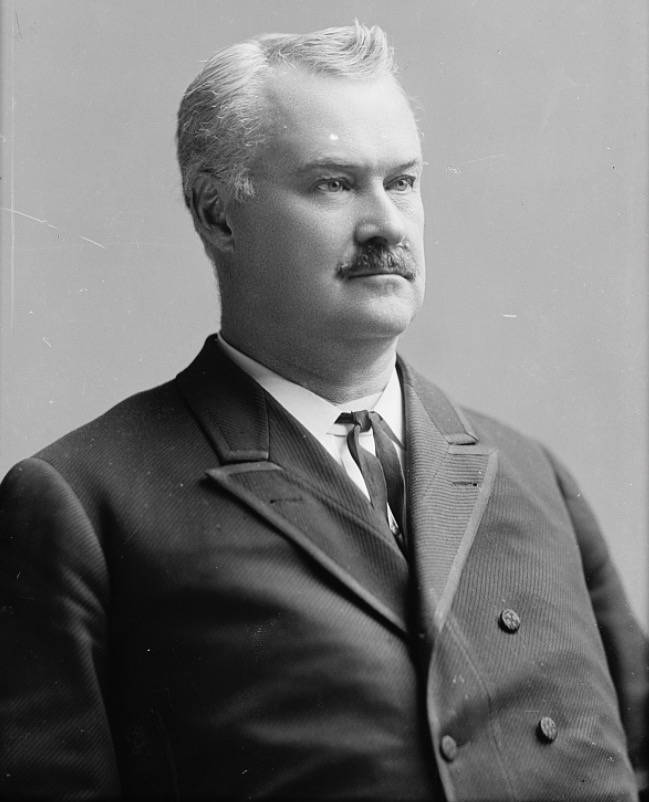
- Portrait of Mansur by Charles Milton Bell

Member of the U.S. House of Representatives from Missouri's 2nd district
- In office March 4, 1887 – March 3, 1893
- Preceded by: John B. Hale
- Succeeded by: Uriel S. Hall

Personal details
- Born: Charles Harley Mansur; March 6, 1835 Philadelphia, Pennsylvania, US
- Died: April 16, 1895 (aged 60) Washington, D.C., US
- Party: Democratic
- Other political affiliations: Liberal Republican
- Education: Lawrence Academy
- Profession: Politician, lawyer

Charles Harley Mansur (March 6, 1835 – April 16, 1895) was an American lawyer and politician. A Democrat, he was a member of the United States House of Representatives from Missouri.

== Early life ==
Mansur was born on March 6, 1835, in Philadelphia, to Charles Mansur and Rebecca (née Wills) Mansur. He was of French ancestry. He moved to St. Louis at age 2, then to Ray County, Missouri in 1845. Educated at common schools, he attended Lawrence Academy for three years, then worked as a clerk and read law. On August 30, 1856, he was admitted to the bar in Richmond, Missouri, beginning his practice on November 1, in Chillicothe.

== Career ==
A Democrat, Mansur was a Confederate sympathizer. In 1854, he was appointed Sheriff of Ray Countt, He spent eight years on the Chillicothe board of education. From 1864 to 1868, he was a member of the Missouri Democratic central committee, and was a delegate to the 1868 and 1884 Democratic National Conventions. At the national conventions, he championed nominations for Governor John S. Phelps and Presidential Candidate Allen G. Thurman. From 1875 to 1879, he was district attorney of Livingston County.

Mansur unsuccessfully ran for the United States House of Representatives in 1872 and 1880, running both times for the 10th district, and in the 1872 campaign, jointly with the Liberal Republican Party. He later won, and represented the 2nd district from March 4, 1887, to March 3, 1893. He lost the bid for renomination in 1892. While in Congress, he served on the Committees on the Judiciary and on Territories. He held expansionist beliefs, having supported the organization of the Oklahoma Territory and statehoodship for Arizona. He once violated a five-minute speaking limit, instead speaking for 4.5 hours.

From May 29, 1893, to October 1, 1894, Mansur served as Second Comptroller of the United States Department of the Treasury, then as Assistant Comptroller from October 1, 1894, to until his death. While working for the Treasury, he earned $4,500 per year. He also maintained a relationship with military officer Thomas Lincoln Casey Sr.

== Personal life and death ==
On September 15, 1859, Mansur married Damaris M. Brosheer, and they had two children together. He was a member of multiple fraternities, such as the Independent Order of Odd Fellows. He reportedly stood at 6 ft 2 in (1.88 m) and weighed 250 pounds (110 kg). He consumed alcohol moderately and had a sedentary lifestyle. He died on April 16, 1895, aged 60, in Washington, D.C., from heart and kidney disease. He is buried in the Sunny Slope Cemetery, in Richmond, Missouri.

U.S. House of Representatives
Preceded by John B. Hale	Member of the U.S. House of Representatives from Missouri's 2nd congressional district 1887–1893	Succeeded by Uriel S. Hall
