= Hedding College =

Former college in Abingdon, Illinois, US

Coordinates: 40°48′21″N 90°24′11″W

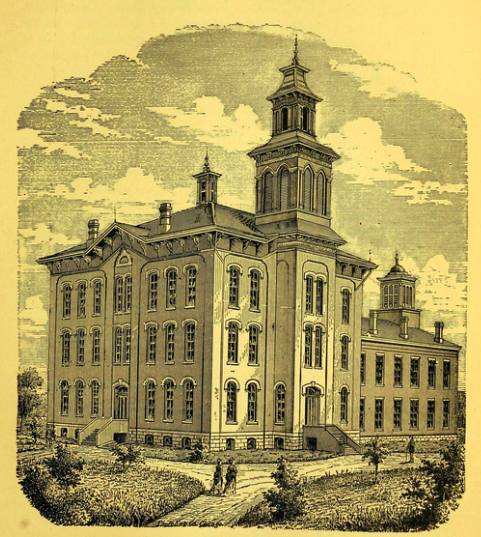
Hedding College

Hedding College was a college in Abingdon, Illinois, that operated from 1855 to 1927. The school was named after Methodist Bishop Elizah Hedding. Merged with Illinois Wesleyan University in 1930. The campus was used by the Roosevelt Military Academy for a while.

The college closed in 1927 because the Methodist Church thought there were too many other schools in Illinois. Records from the college were transferred to Illinois Wesleyan University. The building was torn down in 1947, and in 1953 Hedding Grade School was built there. The pillars from the building were saved and used as part of the Sesquicentennial Gateway at Illinois Wesleyan University.

Hedding College was a member of the Illinois Intercollegiate Athletic Conference from 1910 to 1926. It had a chapter of Sigma Iota Chi sorority.

== Notable people ==
- Allie Luse Dick, Hedding College director of music (1887-88)
