= Thomas Allen (Missouri politician) =

American politician (1813–1882)

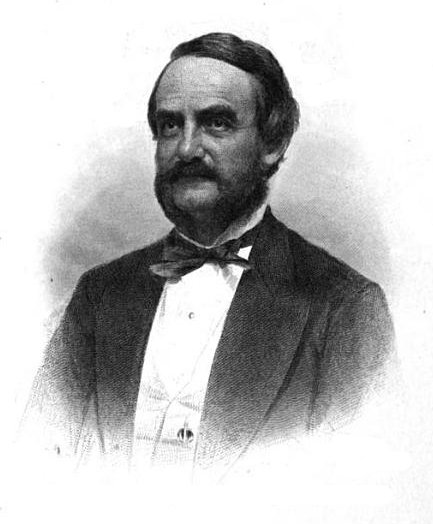

Member of the U.S. House of Representatives from Missouri's 2nd district
- In office March 4, 1881 – April 8, 1882
- Preceded by: Erastus Wells
- Succeeded by: James Henry McLean

Member of the Missouri Senate
- In office 1851–1855

Personal details
- Born: August 29, 1813 Pittsfield, Massachusetts, US
- Died: April 8, 1882 (aged 68) Washington, D.C., US
- Resting place: Pittsfield Cemetery, Pittsfield, Massachusetts
- Party: Democratic
- Spouse: Ann Russell

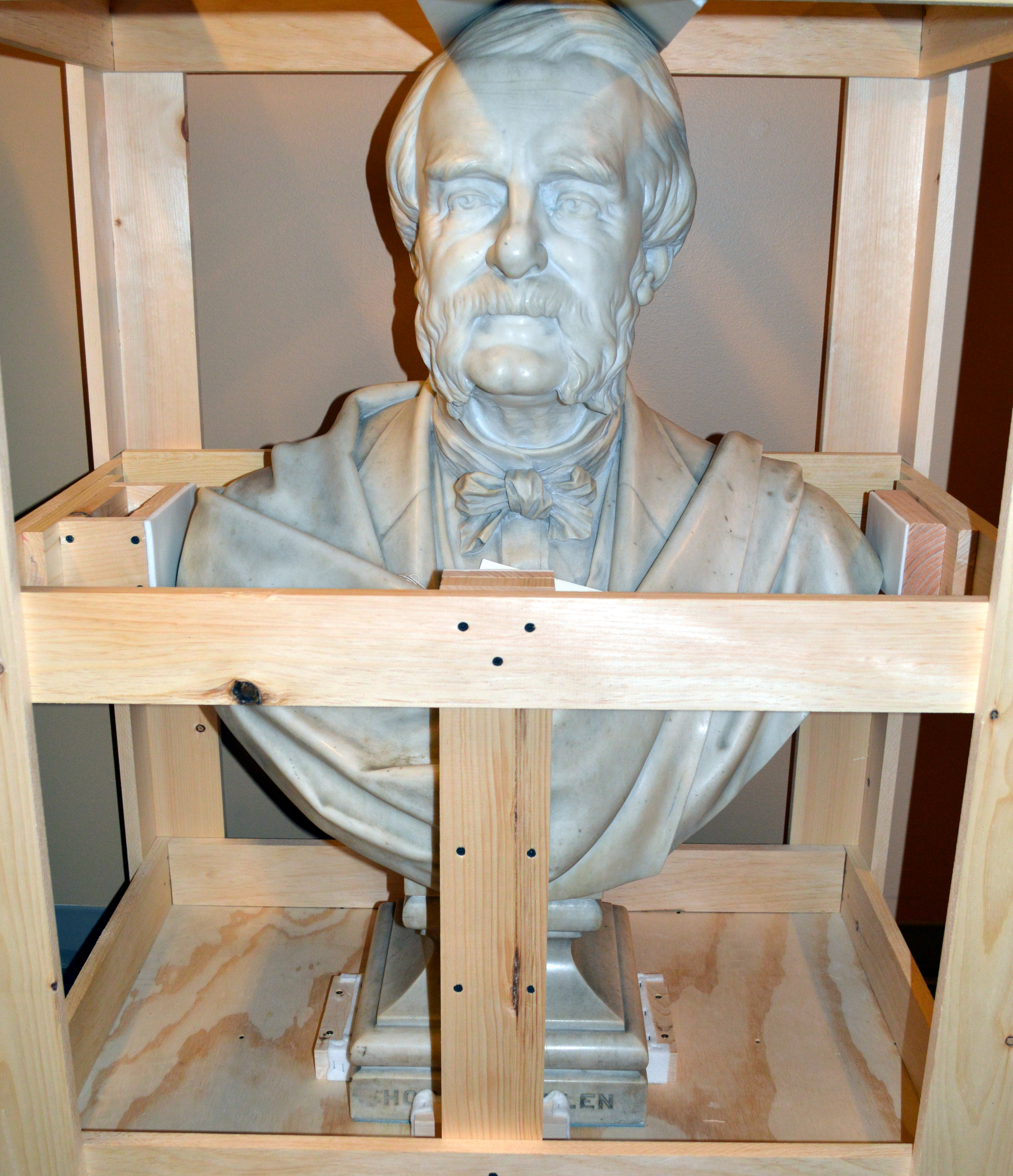
Marble bust of Thomas Allen

Thomas Allen (August 29, 1813 – April 8, 1882) was an American railroad builder and a member of the United States House of Representatives from Missouri.

Allen was born in Pittsfield, Massachusetts, to Jonathan and Eunice Larned Allen, and was a grandson of Rev. Thomas Allen, a noted American revolutionary. He attended Pittsfield Academy and Berkshire Gymnasium. He graduated from Union College in 1832, where he obtained his degree with Phi Beta Kappa honors and was an early member of The Kappa Alpha Society. He then studied law and was admitted to the New York bar in 1835. In 1837, he moved to Washington, D.C., where he founded the newspaper The Madisonian, a Democratic newspaper. He was the printer of the United States House of Representatives from 1837 to 1839, and printer to the United States Senate from 1839 to 1842.

In 1842 Allen married Ann Russell and moved to St. Louis, Missouri. His father-in-law, William Russell, gave him land in south St. Louis, which he developed as residential property attractive for working-class immigrants. It was the largest tract in St. Louis developed by a single person.

He was a slave owner; an advertisement for a reward for the return of escaped slaves by a "Thomas Allen, Esq." of St. Louis, Missouri, was published in newspapers in 1847.

He was elected to the Missouri State Senate in 1850, remaining a member of that body through 1854. Also in 1850, Allen was elected president of the Pacific Railroad with the support of Thomas Hart Benton. With his political connections, he arranged for loan guarantees and land grants that helped to start the company. In 1852 he took the first steam locomotive to cross the Mississippi River. Following a series of financial crises for the railroad, Allen resigned from the company and returned to land-development. In 1858 he was the organizer of the banking house Allen, Copp & Nisbet. He subsequently sold his railway interests and retired from business. After an unsuccessful run for Congress in 1862, he returned to the railroad business in 1867 with the St. Louis, Iron Mountain and Southern Railway. He was the founder of the Allen professorship of Mining and Metallurgy at Washington University in St. Louis and in 1876 he donated the Berkshire Athenaeum to his hometown of Pittsfield, Massachusetts.

Allen was elected to the United States House of Representatives from Missouri in 1881. He sold railroad holdings to fellow railroad developer Jay Gould.

In April 1882, Allen died in Washington, D.C., before his first and only term as a member of Congress was complete. He was buried in Pittsfield Cemetery, Pittsfield, Massachusetts.

Allenville, Missouri is named after him.

== See also ==
- Who Was Who in America Historical Volume, 1607-1896. Chicago: Marquis Who's Who, 1967.
- List of members of the United States Congress who died in office (1790–1899)

U.S. House of Representatives
Preceded by Erastus Wells	Member of the U.S. House of Representatives from Missouri's 2nd congressional district March 4, 1881 – April 8, 1882	Succeeded by James Henry McLean
