= James Crafts =

American chemist

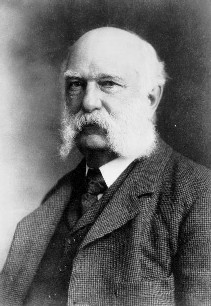

4th President of the Massachusetts Institute of Technology
- In office 1897–1900
- Preceded by: Francis Amasa Walker
- Succeeded by: Henry Smith Pritchett

Personal details
- Born: March 8, 1839 Boston, Massachusetts
- Died: June 20, 1917 (aged 78) Ridgefield, Connecticut
- Education: Harvard University

James Mason Crafts (March 8, 1839 – June 20, 1917) was an American chemist, mostly known for developing the Friedel–Crafts alkylation and acylation reactions with Charles Friedel in 1876. A research chemist for most of his career, Crafts also served as president of the Massachusetts Institute of Technology from 1898 to 1900.

== Biography ==
James Crafts, the son of Royal Altamont Crafts and Marianne Mason (daughter of Senator Jeremiah Mason), was born in Boston, Massachusetts and graduated from Harvard University in 1858. Although he never received his Ph.D., he studied chemistry in Germany at the Academy of Mines (1859) of Freiberg, and served as an assistant to Robert Bunsen at Heidelberg, and then with Wurtz in Paris (1861).

It was in Paris that Crafts first met Charles Friedel, with whom he later carried out some of his most successful research. Crafts returned to the United States in 1865. In 1868, he was appointed as the first professor of chemistry at the newly founded Cornell University in Ithaca, New York, where he remained until 1870.

During the following four years Crafts served as professor of chemistry at the Massachusetts Institute of Technology (MIT), but in 1874 took a leave of absence, joined Friedel in Paris, and devoted himself exclusively to scientific research. Upon his second return to the United States, in 1891, Crafts became professor of organic chemistry at MIT (1892–97), where he also served as president from 1898 to 1900. In 1900, Crafts resigned the presidency, and again turned to the investigation of problems in organic and physical chemistry.

== Scientific work ==
Craft's investigations were largely in the field of organic chemistry, but his name is connected also with many interesting achievements in physics and in physical chemistry. He invented a new hydrogen thermometer; measured the densities of iodine at very high temperatures; demonstrated an interesting regularity in the variation of the boiling points of chemically allied substances with the external pressure; prepared a number of new compounds of the element silicon, which are interesting because of their chemical resemblance to the corresponding compounds of carbon; and also prepared new compounds of arsenic. But his most important achievement was the discovery, jointly with Friedel, of one of the most fruitful synthetic methods in organic chemistry, the Friedel–Crafts reaction.

Hundreds of new carbon compounds have been brought into existence by this method (New International Encyclopedia), which is based on the catalytic action of the chloride of aluminium.

== Recognition ==
In recognition of Crafts's services to science, he was elected to the American Academy of Arts and Sciences in 1867 and the United States National Academy of Sciences in 1872. The French government made him a chevalier of the Legion of Honor (1885), and the British Association for the Advancement of Science made him one of its corresponding members. Harvard University conferred on him the honorary degree of LL.D. in 1898. He was elected to the American Philosophical Society in 1916.

The Crafts entry at MIT's Senior House dormitory is named in his honor.

== Selected writings ==
- A chronologically-arranged list of Crafts' papers is in the biographical note of Cross.
- Qualitative Analysis (1869, and several later editions)

Academic offices
Preceded by Francis Amasa Walker	4th President of the Massachusetts Institute of Technology; 1897 – 1900	Succeeded by Henry Smith Pritchett
