= John B. Hale =

American politician and lawyer (1831–1905)

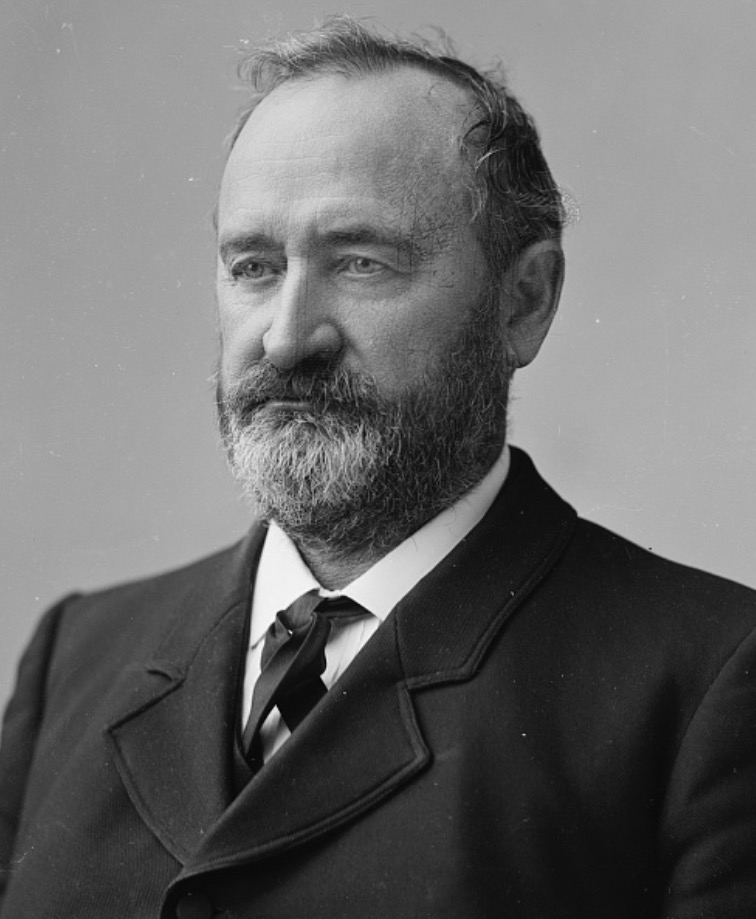
- Portrait of Hale by Charles Milton Bell, taken between 1873 and 1890

Member of the U.S. House of Representatives from Missouri's 2nd district
- In office March 4, 1885 – March 3, 1887
- Preceded by: Armstead M. Alexander
- Succeeded by: Charles H. Mansur

Member of the Missouri House of Representatives
- In office 1856–1858

Personal details
- Born: John Blackwell Hale; February 27, 1831 Hancock County, Virginia, US
- Died: February 1, 1905 (aged 73) Carrollton, Missouri, US
- Party: Democratic
- Other political affiliations: Republican
- Occupation: Politician, lawyer

Military service
- Allegiance: United States
- Branch/service: Union army
- Years of service: 1862–1865
- Rank: Colonel
- Battles/wars: American Civil War

John Blackwell Hale (February 27, 1831 – February 1, 1905) was an American politician and lawyer. A Democrat, he was a member of the United States House of Representatives from Missouri.

Born in Virginia, Hale moved to Missouri and practiced law in Brunswick. He was a member of the Missouri House of Representatives. During the American Civil War, he served in the Union army. He was a member of the United States House from 1855 to 1887, representing Missouri's 2nd district.

== Early life ==
Hale was born on February 27, 1831, in Brooke County, Virginia (now Hancock County, West Virginia), the son of Presbyterian minister John Hale and Elizabeth (née Blackwell) Hale. He was educated at common schools in Virginia.

In 1841, Hale moved to Missouri, returning to Virginia in 1844, until moving permanently to the state in 1847. There, he read law under Able & Stringfellow, and in 1849, was admitted to the bar, after which he began practicing law in Brunswick.

== Career ==
Hale was a Democrat. In 1855, he was a candidate for the Missouri General Assembly, losing to one Dr. Atwood by 24 votes. He was elected the following year by over 500 votes. He served in the House from 1856 to 1858, and was the youngest member at the time.

Hale was a Presidential elector in the 1860 election, as which he voted for Stephen A. Douglas. He was again a Presidential elector in the 1872 presidential election, as which he voted for Horace Greeley. He was a delegate to the 1864 and 1868 Democratic National Conventions, as well as to the 1875 Missouri Constitutional convention.

On November 3, 1862, during the American Civil War, Hale served in the Union army, becoming colonel of the 4th Provisional Regiment and the 65th Regiment, both of the Missouri State Militia. He retired from service on March 12, 1865.

Hale was a member of the United States House of Representatives, from March 4, 1885, to March 3, 1887, representing Missouri's 2nd district. He was not nominated for the following election. Ideologically, he was conservative. In 1888, he switched to the Republican Party. With the party, he was nominated for Judge of the Western District of the Missouri Court of Appeals, among other offices, all of which he refused.

After serving in Congress, Hale returned to practicing law. From 1862 to 1881, he was a member of the partnership Hale & Eads. He and two of his sons, Arthur Hale and John G. Hale, founded Hale & Sons, which dissolved after Arthur died and John G. Hale moved to Chicago. Hale practiced law until 1900, when he suffered paralysis.

== Personal life and death ==
In 1858, Hale married Mary Claiborne Cosby, with whom he had six children. He died on February 1, 1905, aged 73, in Carrollton, Missouri, and was buried at in Oak Hill Cemetery, in Carrollton.

U.S. House of Representatives
Preceded by Armstead M. Alexander	Member of the U.S. House of Representatives from Missouri's 2nd congressional district 1885–1887	Succeeded by Charles H. Mansur
