= Missouri Wesleyan College =

College in Cameron, Missouri (1883–1939)

Missouri Wesleyan College was a college in Cameron, Missouri, from 1883 until 1930.

The school opened as the Cameron Institute and became a college in 1887 after Methodists acquired it.

The college was best known for its music department where Allie Luse Dick served as the director of music (1892-95).

In 1912, it was among the original founders of the Mid-America Intercollegiate Athletics Association. In 1922 it was among the first owners of a radio station WFAQ operating initially on 834 kc. The station closed in 1924.

The school merged with Baker University in 1926 and closed in 1930.

== Notable alumni ==
- Sam A. Baker, Missouri's 36th governor
