= John Pritchett =

John Pritchett may refer to:

- John Pritchett (bishop)
- John Pritchett (sound engineer)
- John Pritchett (golfer)
- Johnny Pritchett, English boxer
