= Robert N. Bodine =

American lawyer and politician (1837–1914)

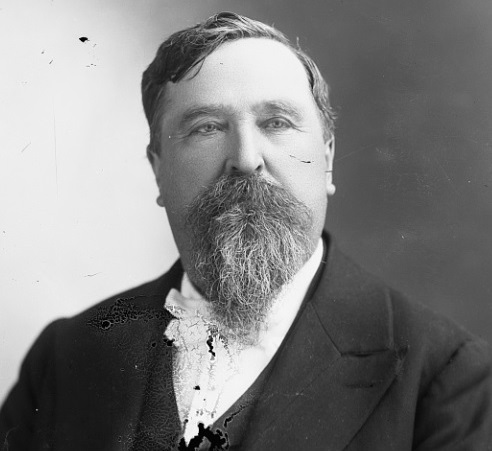
- 1897 portrait of Bodine by Charles Milton Bell

Member of the U.S. House of Representatives from Missouri's 2nd district
- In office March 4, 1897 – March 3, 1899
- Preceded by: Uriel S. Hall
- Succeeded by: William W. Rucker

Member of the Missouri House of Representatives from the Monroe County district
- In office 1888–1892
- Preceded by: Joseph W. Atterbury
- Succeeded by: Joseph A. Scott

Personal details
- Born: Robert Nall Bodine; December 17, 1837 Paris, Missouri, US
- Died: March 16, 1914 (aged 76) Paris, Missouri, US
- Party: Democratic
- Children: 5
- Education: University of Missouri
- Occupation: Lawyer, politician

Robert Nall Bodine (December 17, 1837 – March 16, 1914) was an American lawyer and politician. A Democrat, he was a member of the United States House of Representatives from Missouri.

== Biography ==
Bodine was born on December 17, 1837, near Paris, Missouri, to Isaac Addison Bodine and Mary Moriah (née Gore) Bodine. Educated at Paris Academy, he graduated from the University of Missouri in 1859. Afterward, he served as a public school administrator and read law under Theodore Brace. For a time, he worked in Louisville, Kentucky, as a "stripper" in a tobacco factory. He admitted to the bar, after which he practiced in Paris and served as district attorney of Monroe County.

A Democrat, Bodine was a delegate to the 1890 Missouri state convention. From 1888 to 1892, he represented Monroe County in the Missouri House of Representatives. From March 4, 1897, to March 3, 1899, he represented the 2nd district in the United States House of Representatives. He played in the 1897 Anglo-American cable chess matches; American Chess Magazine described him as "versed in the openings, but not a deep analyist". While serving, he was a member of the Committee on Armed Services. He lost the bid for renomination.

After serving in Congress, Bodine returned to practicing law in Paris. He was married to Lucy Robinson and they had five children together. He was a Christian, as well as a Freemason. He died on March 16, 1914, aged 76, in Paris, from hemiparesis. He was buried on March 18, in Walnut Grove Cemetery, in Paris.

U.S. House of Representatives
Preceded by Uriel S. Hall	Member of the U.S. House of Representatives from Missouri's 2nd congressional district March 4, 1897 – March 3, 1899	Succeeded by William W. Rucker
