= Pritchett College =

Former college in Missouri, United States

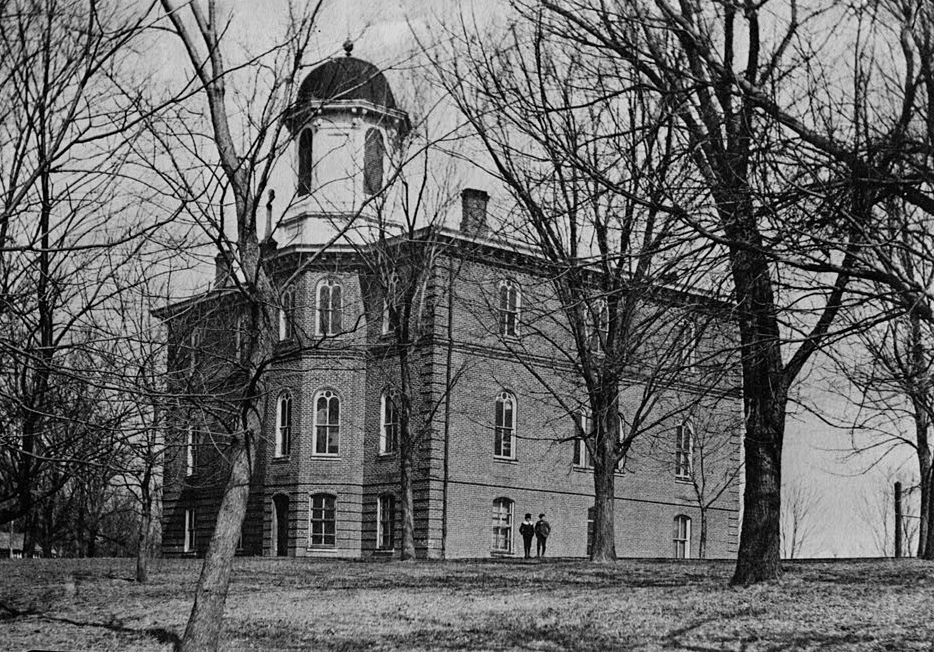
Pritchett School Institute. c1933

Pritchett College was a small institution that operated in Glasgow, Missouri from 1866 until 1922. It was founded as Pritchett School Institute and became known as Pritchett College after 1897.

== History ==
The first classes were conducted in the 1866–67 academic year at 3rd and Market Streets in buildings that previously housed Glasgow Female Seminary. Rev. James O. Swinney provided funds and organized the school. The first Board of Trustees appointed by the Glasgow city council were James O. Swinney, Henry C. Cockerill, and Joshua Belden.

Carr W. Pritchett, formerly a faculty member at Howard College in Fayette, Missouri, was hired to serve as the first president and the institution was known as Pritchett School Institute. The school was Christian, non-denominational and admission was open for both males and females. Initial enrollment was 146 students.

Swinney later donated money to purchase new grounds and a three-story brick building served 200 students in 1869. The original buildings were sold to Lewis College. C.W. Pritchett retired and was succeeded by Oren Root, Jr. as president from 1873–1876. There were 160 students in 1876. The institution offered preparatory, collegiate, and post graduate courses and there were fifty graduates in the first ten years, with twenty-four receiving the B.A. degree and two the M.A. degree.

Resources were limited and the trustees of Pritchett explored the possibility of merger with a proposal to move Central College to Glasgow in 1878. Several unsuccessful attempts were also made to merge with Lewis College, the latest in 1880.

Upper-level college courses were no longer offered after 1917 and Pritchett College was then considered to be a junior college. It ceased operation after June, 1922.

== Morrison Observatory ==
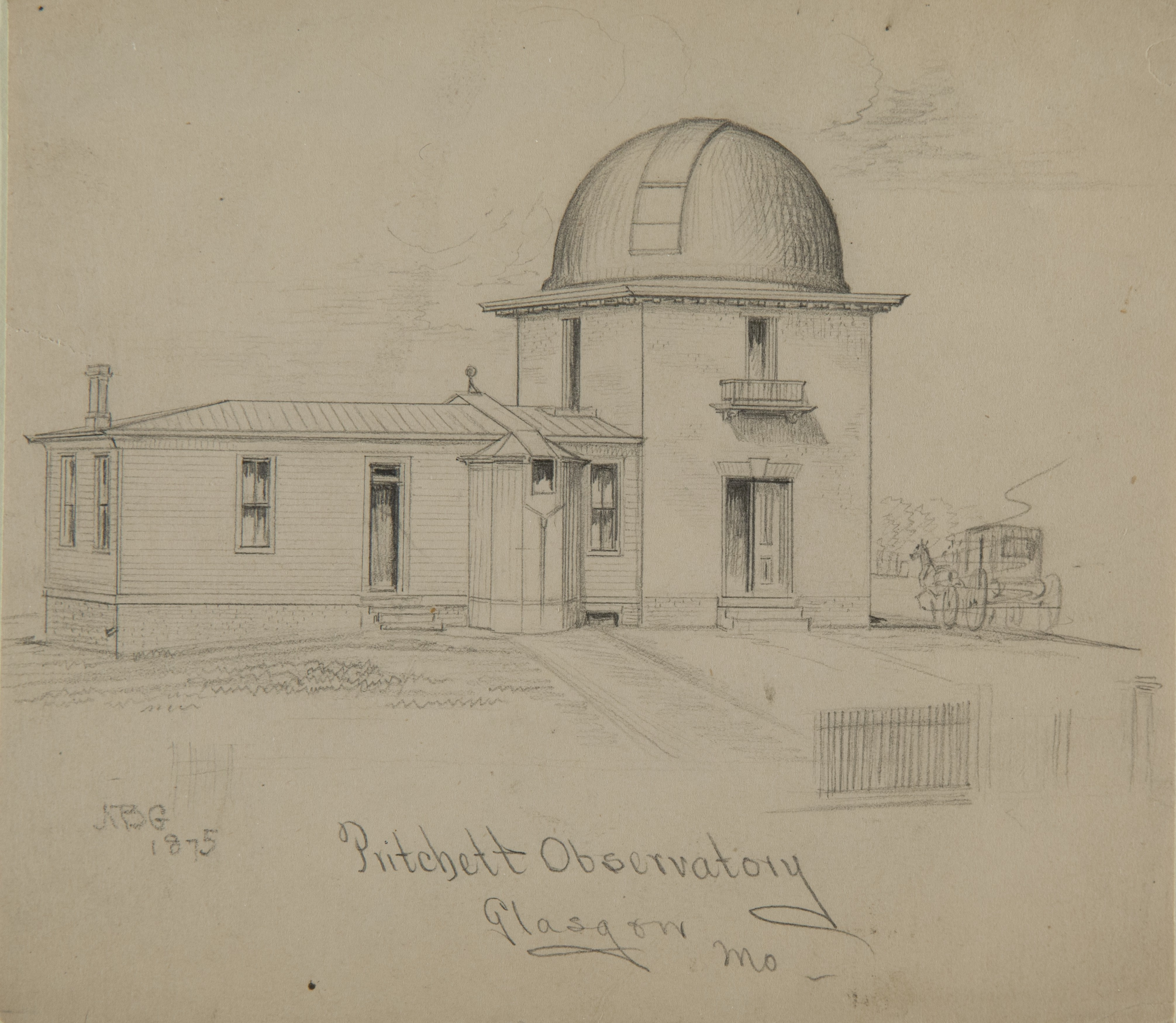
A drawing by A. B. Greene depicts the Pritchett College Morrison Observatory in Glasgow, Missouri in 1875

C. W. Pritchett secured a generous donation in 1874 from Berenice Morrison to purchase equipment and construct a building for the Morrison Astronomical Observatory. Work began in early 1875 and a telescope was mounted within a year. Dr. Pritchett continued as director of the observatory following the end of his presidency and served until September, 1905. He conducted some remarkable research with the assistance of his two sons and others. Many have claimed that Pritchett discovered the "Great Red Spot". In fact, he made observations of the Spot, but did not discover it. Observations of the are probably the best known, and Dr. Pritchett was designated as a Fellow of the Royal Astronomical Society of England.

The observatory was not used after 1907 and was eventually moved to Central College in Fayette, Missouri in 1936.

== Presidents ==
- Carr Waller Pritchett (1866 – 1872)
- Oren D. Root (1873 – 1876), brother of Nobel Prize recipient Elihu Root
- R. Thompson Bond (1877 – 1880)
- Joseph Henry Pritchett (1881 – 1884), younger brother of Carr Waller Pritchett
- Joel Sutton Kendall (1885 – 1894), later served as first president of North Texas Normal School
- C. C. Hemenway (1894 – 1904)
- Uriel S. Hall (1905 – 1917), U.S. Congressman from 1893–1897
- Oscar Dahlene (1917 – 1920)
- Elizabeth Jeffreys (1920 – 1922)

== Noted faculty ==
- H. Clay Harvey, taught mathematics at Pritchett (1894–1900) and at Kirksville State Teacher's College (1900–1912); served as Superintendent of Schools in McAllen, Texas (1914–1917)
- George F. Kuemmel, Music
- Susan F. Smith, Modern Languages, Drawing, Painting
- Samuel H. Trowbridge, Natural Science

== Noted alumni ==
- Henry Carr Pritchett, Texas Superintendent of Public Instruction (1890), Professor of Mathematics and later, president of Sam Houston Normal Institute (1881–1908)
- Henry Smith Pritchett, President of MIT and the Carnegie Foundation for the Advancement of Teaching
- Anna Lee Dey Stacey, painter
