= Oscar Dahlene =

American football player and coach (1886–1949)

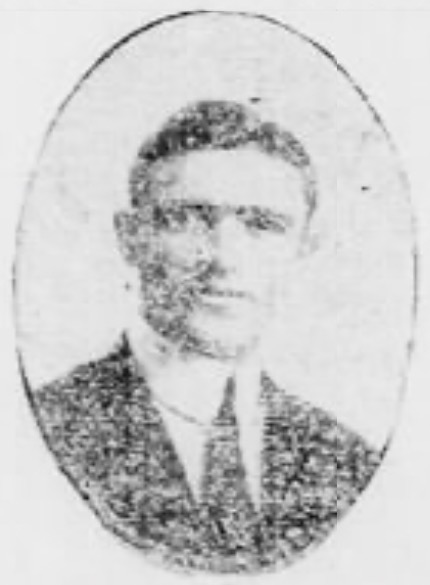

Biographical details
- Born: April 24, 1886
- Died: October 22, 1949 (aged 63); Tuscaloosa, Alabama, US

Playing career
- 1908–1909: Kansas
- Positions: Placekicker, fullback

Coaching career (HC unless noted)
- 1910: Ottawa (KS)

Head coaching record
- Overall: 2–3–1

Oscar J. Dahlene (April 24, 1886 – October 22, 1949) was an American college football player and coach. He was the eighth president of Pritchett College in Glasgow, Missouri, serving from 1917 until 1920. He died in Tuscaloosa, Alabama.

== Playing career ==
Dahlene joined the football program his junior year at the University of Kansas as a placekicker and fullback, under head coach A. R. Kennedy.

The 1908 Kansas Jayhawks were the undisputed Missouri Valley Conference champion and finished with a record of 9–0. As a kicker, he was the only player to score in the first half of the Nebraska game in 1908, scoring 16 points. Kansas won the game by a score of 20–15, thus making Dahlene's 16 points critical to their undefeated 9–0 season and conference title.

In 1909, Kansas went 8–1, starting the season with eight straight wins, and the program did not repeat until the 2007 season.

== Coaching career ==
After graduation from the University of Kansas, Dahlene was named the head football coach at Ottawa University in Ottawa, Kansas. He held the position for the 1910 season, compiling a record of 2–3–1. His 1910 teams was outscored by one point: 30–29.

Season results

Game #	W/L	Opponent	Score	Notes
1	L	Kansas	0-11	Opposing coach A. R. Kennedy accumulated more wins than any other coach at KU and is second in winning percentage. Game was played October 10, 1910 in Lawrence, Kansas.
2	W	Washburn University	9-0	Washburn ended the season 4-4
3	T	Baker University	3-3	Baker returned to competition this year because the Kansas conference of the Methodist church had banned the game from the Baker campus in 1893
4	W	Haskell Indian Nations University	11-0	Home game on November 13, 1910 This was one of seven losses for Haskell, who completed the season at an uncharacteristic poor record of 2-7
5	L	Kansas Normal School	0-5	Opposing coach Fred Honhart completed season 5–2.
6	L	William Jewell College	6-11	William Jewell fielded Charles M. Boyer, future US Army Colonel and member of the Southern Football Officials’ Association
