= Lewis College =

College in Glasgow, Missouri, U.S. (1867-92)

Lewis College was a small institution that operated in Glasgow, Missouri from 1867 until 1892.

== History ==
The college was founded by two brothers, Benjamin W. and James W. Lewis. The Lewis family were active members of the Methodist Church and supporters of the Union during the Civil War. They helped form a new congregation of the Methodist Episcopal Church in Glasgow and a school named Lewis High School was started in the basement of the church, directed by the minister, Rev. D.A. McCready.

Benjamin Lewis died in 1866 and left $10,000 in his will to maintain a library. His family erected the building and incorporated as Lewis College and Library Association in 1867. The library building was deeded to the Missouri Conference of the Methodist Episcopal Church.

The college opened in the fall of 1867 with 140 students and classes were held in the library. Enrollment was open to both male and female students. Lewis College soon moved in 1869 to buildings across the street from the library that were previously used by Pritchett College.

Lewis College moved in December, 1882 to the Lewis family mansion, Glen Eden. The institution operated for another decade, closing by 1892.

== Lewis Library ==
Lewis Library continues in use today. It is the second oldest library in Missouri and is the oldest library building in constant use west of the Mississippi River.
