= Clarksburg College =

School in Clarksburg, Missouri, US

Clarksburg College was a school in Clarksburg, Missouri, beginning in 1877. It was originally named Clarksburg Academy. The first principal was W. J. Hawkins.

By the 1890s it was granting degrees that allowed students to then go to "Central College", now known as Central Methodist University. Among other subjects it taught education and business.

== Sources ==
- "A Brief History of Clarksburg"
