= Morrison Observatory =

Observatory in Missouri, US

- Organization: Central Methodist University
- Location: 700 Park Road, Fayette, MO
- Coordinates: 39.1°N 92.4°W
- Altitude: 228 m (748 ft)
- Established: 1875

Telescopes
- Clark Refractor: 12.25 in Refractor
- Transit Refractor: 6 in Troughton & Simms Meridian Circle

Morrison Observatory is an astronomical observatory owned and operated by Central Methodist University located in Fayette, Missouri (USA). It was named after Bernice Morrison who, in 1874, pledged $100,000 to C. W. Pritchett for the construction of the observatory. Half of that amount would go the construction of the telescope and observatory; the other half to a permanent trust fund. The observatory was built soon afterwards in Glasgow, Missouri at Pritchett College and opened in 1875.

A 12.25 inch Clark Refractor was installed in a dome that Dr. Pritchett modeled after the Harvard College Observatory. In 1876, a 6-inch Meridian Telescope built by Troughton & Simms of London was installed and the Observatory began selling the time to the Chicago & Alton Railroad and various Time Balls in St. Louis and Kansas City.

In 1922 the Pritchett School Institute failed financially, but in 1926 Central Methodist College, with some encouragement from Morrison and Pritchett, gained possession of the observatory "in order to restore its equipment and make use of it." Because it was awkward to have the observatory in Glasgow, which was 12 miles from the college in Fayette, in 1935 the observatory was moved to a high, unobstructed ridge about 10 minutes' walk from the campus, where it still stands. Harvard's Harlow Shapley was the dedication speaker on June 1, 1936.

In 1961 the Central Missouri Amateur Astronomers built a 12-inch reflecting telescope which they donated to the observatory. It is housed in a building about 100 feet northwest of the Clark refractor in a "Roll off" observatory. This telescope was replaced in later years with a 10" Schmidt-Cassagrain. In 2024 a new mount, CCD camera and full set of photometric filters was added to upgrade the 10" telescope. This telescope is now used for photometric research of stars.

== See also ==
- List of observatories
