= Carr Waller Pritchett Sr. =

American educator and astronomer

Carr Waller Pritchett Sr. (1823–1910) was an American educator and astronomer. He served briefly as president of Central College just before the American Civil War. He then became the first president of Pritchett School Institute in Glasgow, Missouri, after the war, and he was the first director of the Morrison Observatory, also in Glasgow. (The observatory was moved to Fayette, Missouri, in the early 1930s).

C. W. Pritchett was born on September 4, 1823, in Henry County, Virginia; the oldest of ten children to Henry Pritchett and Martha Myra Waller. The family moved in 1835 first to St. Charles, Missouri and then to eastern Warren County, Missouri. At the age of 21 he attended St. Charles College (the first Protestant College west of the Mississippi River); in 1844 he began teaching and in 1846 became what was then known as a licentiate of the Methodist Episcopal Church South. (The equivalent of an ordained minister in today's United Methodist Church).

== See also ==
- Henry Smith Pritchett

Academic offices
Preceded by A.A. Morrison	President of Central Methodist University; 1860	Succeeded by W.A. Anderson
Preceded by Office created	President of Pritchett College; 1866–1872	Succeeded by Oren D. Root, Jr.
