= Howard–Payne Junior College =

Former college in Missouri

Howard–Payne Junior College was a women's college located in Fayette, Missouri. Affiliated with the Methodist Episcopal Church, South, it opened in 1859 and closed in 1927.

== History ==
The college was chartered as Howard Female College in 1859 after existing as an academy for girls since 1828. The American Civil War briefly interrupted classes between 1864 and 1865, though some classes were taught until Union Army troops occupied the campus.

As a result of the war, the college sank deep into debt for a decade, until it was purchased by Moses U. Payne of Rocheport in 1869. After purchasing the college, Payne deeded the college's property and land to the church. Building continued on campus throughout the 1890s, including the addition of a science building and a museum. The college's name was formally changed to Howard–Payne Junior College in 1892.

Howard-Payne was closely associated with several other Missouri junior colleges for women. In 1918, it was one of the eight charter colleges of the Phi Theta Kappa honor society.

In 1923, Howard-Payne received formal accreditation from the Higher Learning Commission and also participated in the HLC's Program to Evaluate and Advance Quality (PEAQ). The college was closed, however, during a consolidation of small Methodist colleges in Missouri in 1927.

Former Howard-Payne buildings are now used by Central Methodist University.

== Notable alumni ==
- Allie Luse Dick (1886, M.A. degree), music teacher

== See also ==
- List of current and historical women's universities and colleges in the United States
