= Greg Olson (historian) =

Historian from Missouri

- Born: 1959 (age 66–67); Marathon, Iowa, U.S.
- Occupations: Author, Historian, Editor
- Board member of: John William Boone Heritage Foundation
- Spouse: Chris Montgomery

Academic background
- Education: University of Missouri, University of South Dakota, Buena Vista University

Greg Olson (born 1959) is an American author, scholar, and historian currently living in Columbia, Missouri. He is the past curator of exhibits and special projects at the Missouri State Archives. In 2020 he was a fellow at the State Historical Society of Missouri. Currently, Olson serves on the board of the Blind Boone Heritage Foundation and as an organizer of the For the People Powwow while continuing his writing and research. His research focuses primarily on the Indigenous peoples of North America, particularly the Ioway and groups associated with Missouri, which he speaks about at local schools and public events.

== Education ==
In 1981, Olson received a bachelor's degree in Art Education and History from Buena Vista University followed by a Master of Fine Arts degree from the University of South Dakota in 1985. He obtained a second Master's in History from the University of Missouri in 2009.

== Works ==
- Indigenous Missourians: Ancient Societies to Present (University of Missouri Press, 2023)
- Ioway Life: Reservation and Reform, 1837-1860 (University of Oklahoma Press, 2016)
- Voodoo Priests, Noble Savages, and Ozark Gypsies: The Life of Folklorist Mary Alicia Owen (University of Missouri Press, 2012)
- The Ioway in Missouri (University of Missouri Press, 2008)
