= Booches =

Bar and restaurant in Columbia, Missouri, U.S.

Coordinates: 38°57′01″N 92°19′39″W

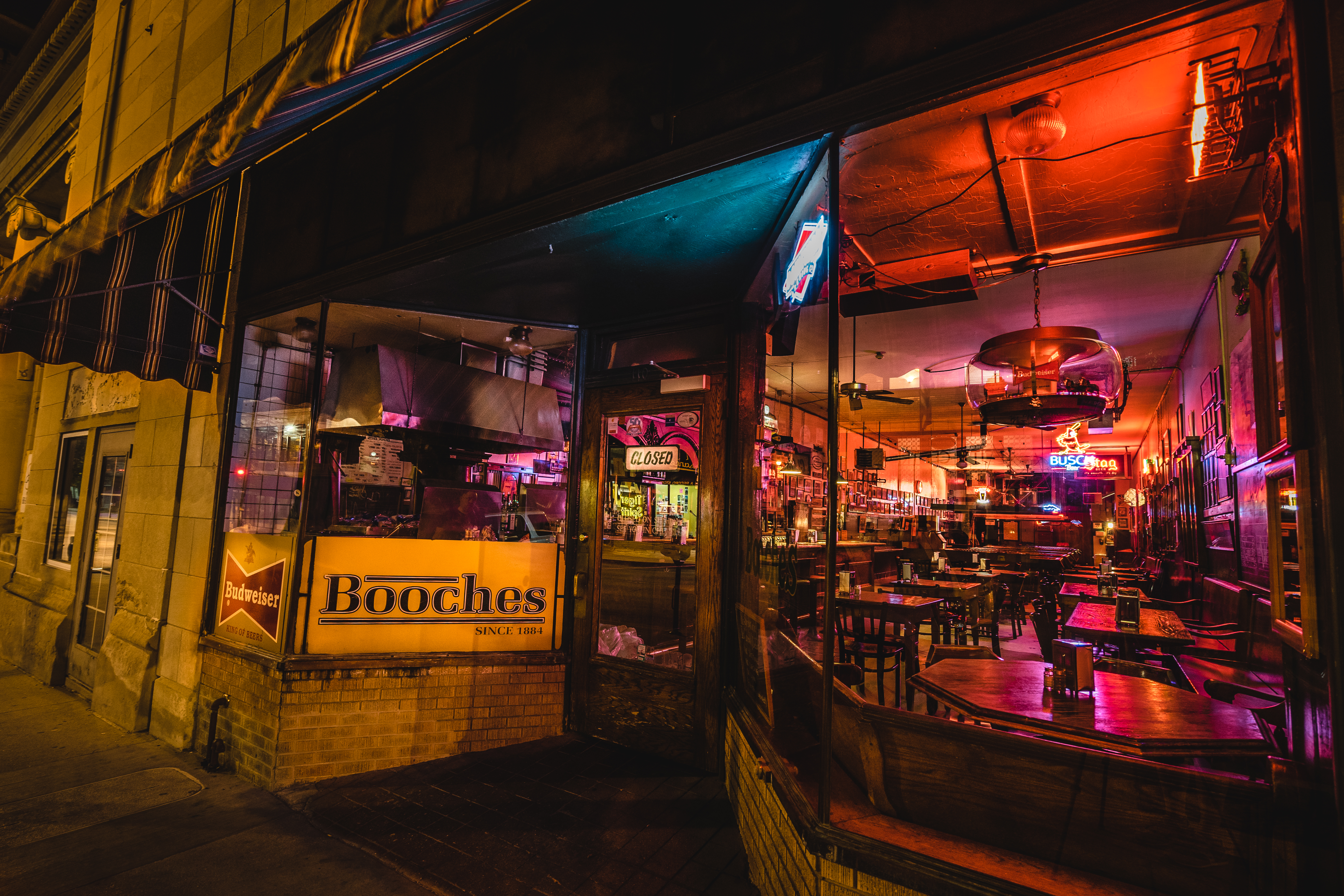
- The front of Booches
- Type: Private
- Industry: Restaurant, retail
- Founded: 1884; 142 years ago
- Founder: Paul Blucher "Booch" Venable
- Headquarters: Columbia, Missouri, United States
- Products: Bar, restaurant, pool hall

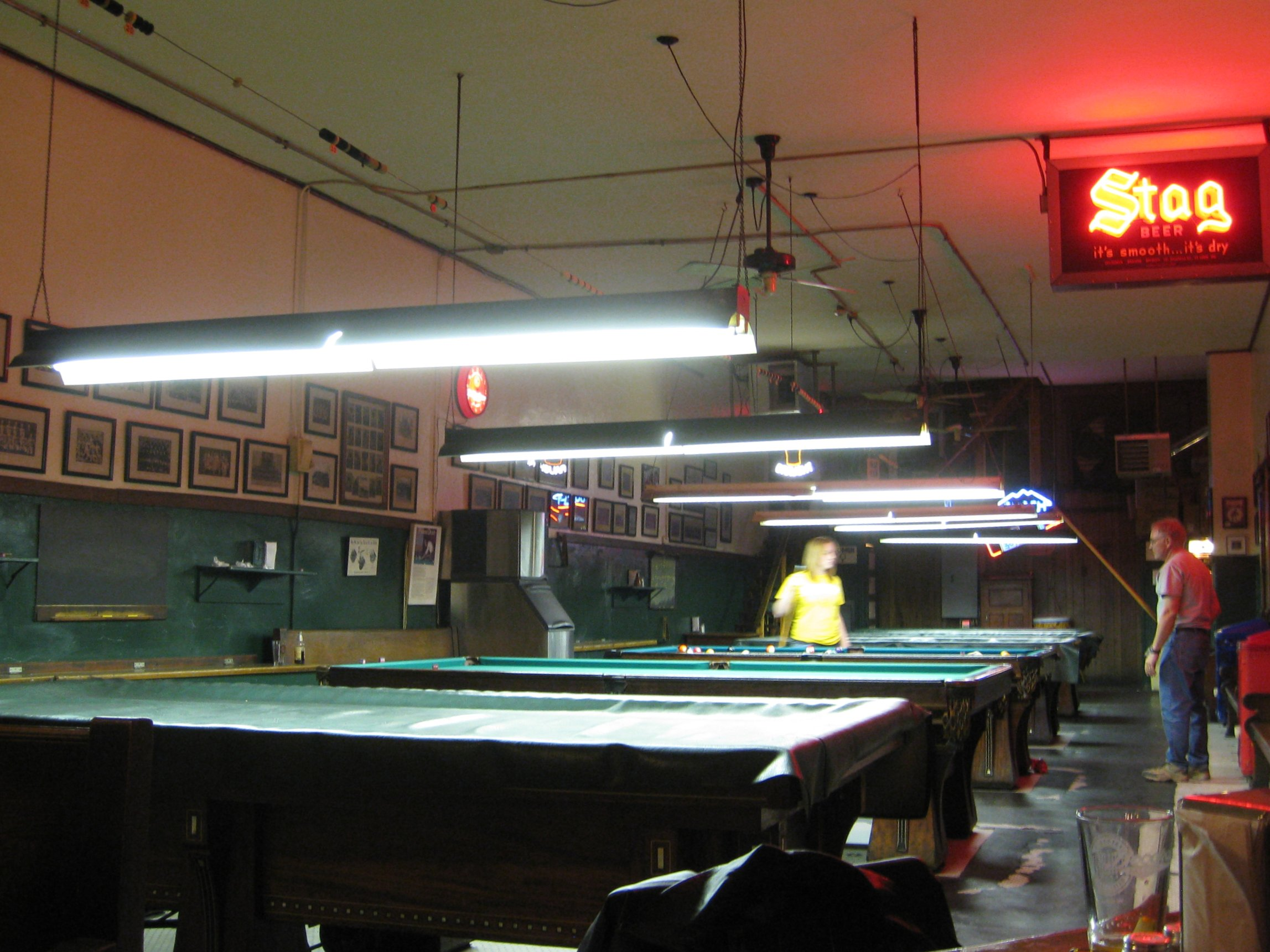
Pool tables at Booches

Booches is a bar, restaurant, and pool hall on 9th Street in downtown Columbia, Missouri. Established in 1884, it is the oldest pool hall in Columbia. It is located near the University of Missouri and has traditionally been frequented by college students. In 2016, Booches was inducted into the Boone County Hall of Fame by the Boone County Historical Society.

The hamburgers that the restaurant produced were listed in USA Today as one of the best in the country in 2000. They were also praised by the publication again in 2005 and by Sports Illustrated in 2019.

== Overview ==
Booches, established in 1884, has had six locations in downtown Columbia. Since 1928 it has been on 18th and has been on 9th Street. It is the oldest pool hall in Columbia and has full-sized pool, snooker, and three cushion billiards tables. Booches serves food, as its hamburgers, which are served on wax paper, were listed in a 2000 report in USA Today as one of the best 25 in the United States. In 2005, Jerry Shriver of USA Today included Booches' hamburger on the list of top 25 dishes from his "Down-home Dining" project. In 2019, Joan Niesen and Laken Litman of Sports Illustrated named Booches' hamburgers as the "#1 Greatest College Town Eats" in the nation.

Booches is named after its founder, Paul Blucher Venable, who was nicknamed "Booch" as a child by writer Eugene Field. Opened as a male-only establishment, during the times of racial segregation in the United States, the establishment would not serve African Americans. By the 1970s it would serve both, and the venue gained a liquor license in 1982.

During the mid to late 1970s, the then-owners of Booches edited and published four issues of the Review la Booche, a nationally published literary journal. The journal featured poetry, prose, sketches, and photographs by John Ciardi, William Stafford, Elton Glaser, Frank Stack, and Richard Eberhart, along with local and regional contributors. The review was revived in 1990 for a fifth and final issue.

Booches is located close to the University of Missouri, and it has traditionally been used by University of Missouri, Kansas City Chiefs & Royals, and St. Louis Cardinals sports fans. It has been described by some in contemporary times as a dive bar and a melting pot. Booches was inducted into the Boone County Historical Society Hall of Fame at the Walters-Boone County Historical Museum in 2016.

== In popular culture ==
Booches was included in the film Norm, which aired on ESPN's SEC Network. Norm depicted the career of the former University of Missouri basketball coach Norm Stewart, who was a regular patron of the establishment.

== See also ==
- List of bars
- List of hamburger restaurants
