= John W. Boone House =

Historic house in Missouri, United States

- U.S. National Register of Historic Places
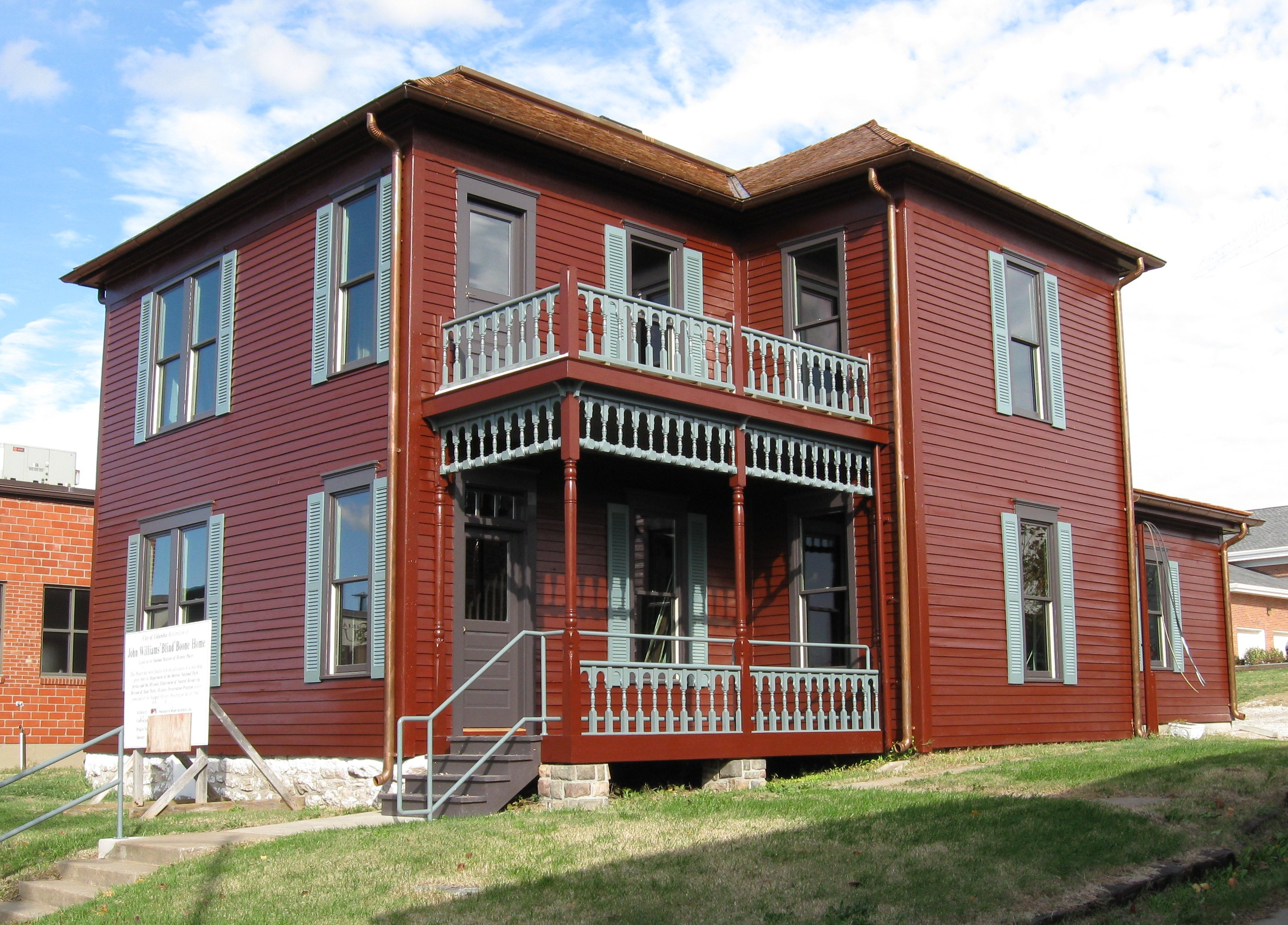

- Location within Missouri Location within the United States
- Location: 4th St. between E. Broadway and Walnut, Columbia, Missouri
- Coordinates: 38°57′8″N 92°19′57″W
- Area: less than one acre
- Architectural style: Box style
- MPS: Social Institutions of Columbia's Black Community TR
- NRHP reference No.: 80002309
- Added to NRHP: September 4, 1980

The John W. Boone House, also known as the Stuart P. Parker Funeral Home, is a historic home located at Columbia, Missouri. It was built about 1890, and is a two-story frame house that measures roughly 46 feet by 45 feet. It was the home of ragtime musician John William 'Blind' Boone. The home, which is owned by the City of Columbia, had fallen into a state of severe disrepair, but is now under restoration

It was listed on the National Register of Historic Places in 1980.
