= Jon Luvelli =

American photographer

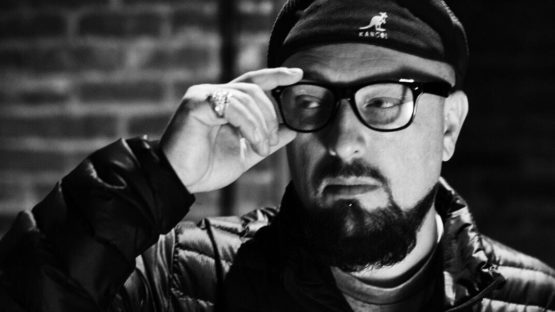
- Luvelli at True/False Film Festival, 2016
- Born: February 20, 1979 (age 47); Como, Italy
- Status: Active
- Occupation: Photographer
- Years active: 1989–present
- Website: jonluvelli.com

Jon Luvelli (born February 20, 1979) is an Italian–American street photographer. He has made black and white images of people in Columbia, Missouri and in rural mid-western American townscapes.

== Career ==
Luvelli was first drawn to photography as a child. His photographs are subjective interpretations.

He has made black and white images depicting idiosyncrasies of people in Columbia, Missouri and in rural mid-western American townscapes. His work conveys social messages, addressing economic and civil issues, in the form of macabre candid photography. His subject matter is the underside of humanity.

In 2016, three of Luvelli's photographs were selected to be part of the permanent collection at the Boone County Historical Society's Walters-Boone County Historical Museum in Columbia, Missouri, its first street photographs. The selection included photographs of the 2015–16 University of Missouri protests, also known as the "Concerned Student 1950" hunger strike. Also in 2016, Luvelli had a solo exhibition at the Museum's Montminy Gallery, of work made on the streets of rural Missouri between 2013 and 2016. Aarik Danielsen of the Columbia Daily Tribune called it "a masterful exhibit."

In 2017, a collection of Luvelli works were added to the State Historical Society of Missouri's permanent art collection.

== Solo exhibitions ==
- 2016: Unseen Columbia, Montminy Gallery, Walters-Boone County Historical Museum, Columbia, Missouri

== Collections ==
Luvelli's work is held in the following permanent collections:

- Walters-Boone County Historical Museum, Columbia, Missouri: 3 prints
- State Historical Society of Missouri, Columbia, Missouri

== Publications by Luvelli ==
- One Block: Photographs from Jon Luvelli. Everyday Street, 2015. ISBN 0692552715.
