= Sherman's Dam =

Coordinates: 38°56′54.6″N 92°18′17.3″W

Sherman's Dam was an impoundment built on Hinkson Creek, Boone County, Missouri. The dam was operational between 1894 and 1920. The dam was constructed to provide a water supply for the city of Columbia, Missouri. The remains of the stone abutments can still be seen and accessed from the walking trail at Stephens Lake Park just upstream of the East Broadway bridge.

== History ==
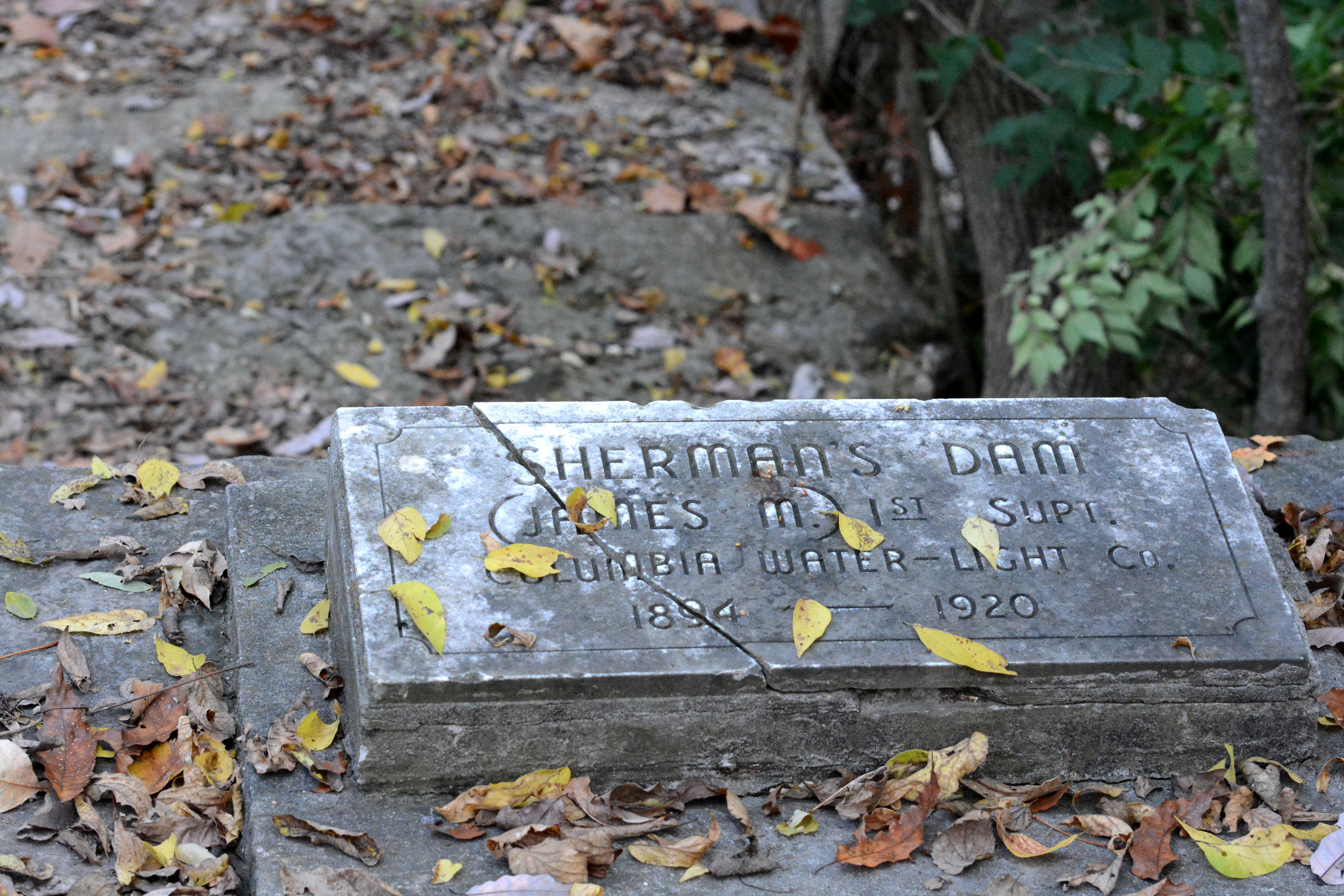
Marker indicating Sherman's Dam, October 2014

Between 1879 and 1889 the city of Columbia experienced a series of catastrophic fires which destroyed significant sections of the town. A lack of adequate water supply to fight these fires was partially responsible for their severity. Then on January 9, 1892, Academic Hall on the University of Missouri campus burned to the ground. Following this event, other cities around the state of Missouri petitioned the Missouri General Assembly to move the university to their location citing the lack of adequate water supply in Columbia. However, the citizens of Boone County quickly raised funds necessary to rebuild. In March 1889 after heated debate, the senate of the Missouri General Assembly overturned a two-day-old Missouri house decision and voted that the university would stay in Columbia but ordered the city to build an adequate water supply with firefighting hydrants in the university area.

Business and civic leaders in the Columbia area created a private company "Columbia Water and Light". The leaders included W. T. Anderson, R. B. Price and I. O. Hockaday of the Boone County National Bank, and Missouri Governor David R. Francis. On December 20, 1892, William Anderson signed a contract with S. D. Gordon to construct the dam and associated steam powered pump and electrical generation plant at the site on Hinkson Creek. The resulting reservoir extended upstream of the dam for about 1 mile (1.6 km). The dam was named after the first superintendent of Columbia Water and Light, James Sherman.

In 1903 in Ithaca, New York, a typhoid epidemic occurred, the source of which was traced to the city water reservoir which was very similar in arrangement to the Columbia facility. This raised awareness of the importance of public water supply for human health and prompted the Columbia City Council to conduct a study of the Hinkson Creek watershed. Various unsanitary hog facilities – where hogs were routinely fed carcasses of horses and cows, runoff from upstream slaughtering operations together with many primitive privies were revealed and resulted in the water supply to be deemed unsafe for potable water. This evidence was used by a citizen activist group called "The Municipal Ownership League" in their political efforts to set up a publicly owned utility which would provide safe drinking water from deep groundwater wells. The efforts were successful and in February 1904, the City of Columbia purchased the assets of Columbia Water and Light Company after overwhelming public approval in a $100,000 bond issue.

There is a marble plaque at the site which reads "SHERMAN'S DAM (JAMES M.) 1st SUP, COLUMBIA WATER – LIGHT, 1894–1920". this indicated the dam was in use until 1920. Thereafter, the deep wells and alternative water sources from More's lake as well as siltation problems ended the utility of Sherman's dam. It is unknown if the dam was demolished or collapsed. Several large pieces of masonry remain in the creek bed downstream of the dam site.

== Design and construction ==
Little is known about the construction of the dam. Efforts made to find photographs of the dam, pump station and electrical generation works have so far proved unsuccessful. The remaining abutments appear to be built of large blocks of limestone varying in dimensions with the largest approximately 4 feet by 3 feet by 2 feet.
