= Maplewood (Columbia, Missouri) =

Historic house in Missouri, United States

- U.S. National Register of Historic Places
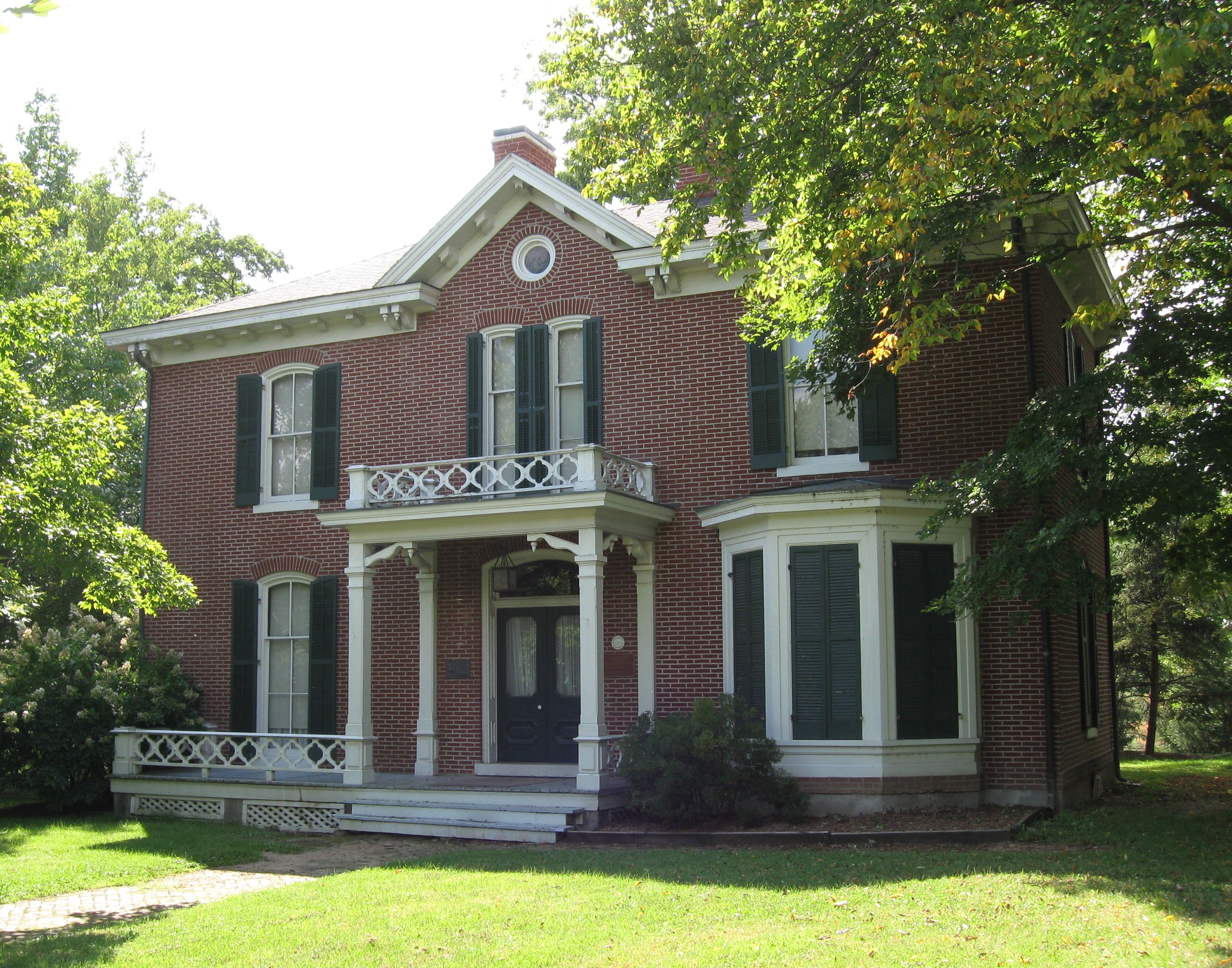

- Location within Missouri Location within the United States
- Location: Nifong Blvd. and Ponderosa Dr., Columbia, Missouri
- Coordinates: 38°54′29″N 92°17′43″W
- Area: 12 acres (4.9 ha)
- Built: 1877
- Built by: Lenoir, Slater Ensor
- NRHP reference No.: 79001348
- Added to NRHP: April 13, 1979

Maplewood is a historic home located in Columbia, Missouri, United States. It was built by Slater Ensor Lenoir and his wife Margaret Bradford Lenoir in 1877. It is a two-story, Italianate style brick dwelling. It was listed on the National Register of Historic Places in 1979.

In 1970, the City of Columbia purchased the home and 60 acres (240,000 m^{2}) of surrounding land. This became the Frank G. Nifong Memorial Park. Today, the home is operated jointly by the Boone County Historical Society and the City of Columbia Parks and Recreation.

Things to do near the building include the annual Heritage Festival in September and the Maplewood Barn Theatre productions all year round.
