= John William Boone =

Blind American ragtime composer and pianist (1864–1927)

Blind Boone
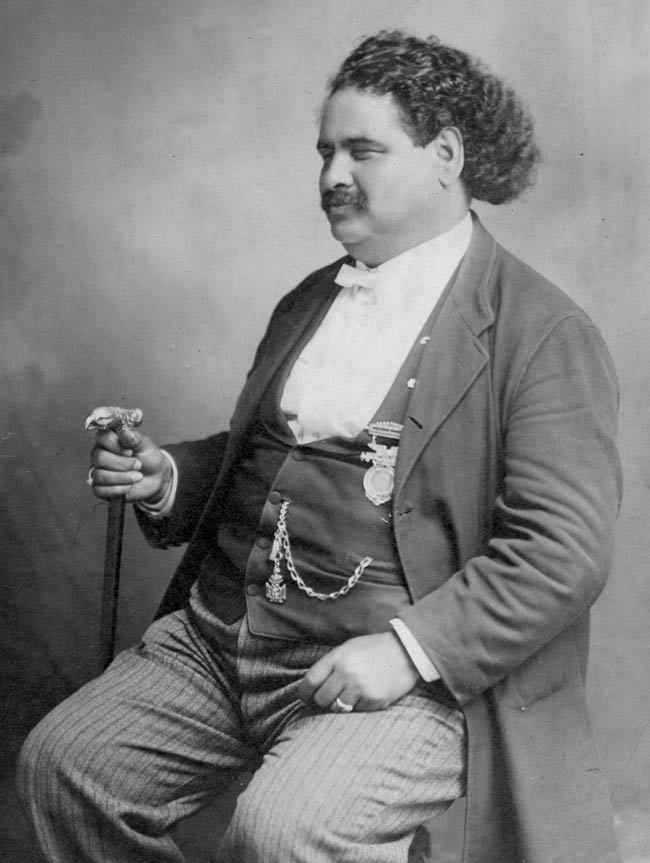
- Boone c. 1908

Background information
- Also known as: Blind Boone, Little Willie
- Born: John William Boone; May 17, 1864; Miami, Missouri, U.S.
- Origin: Columbia, Missouri
- Died: October 4, 1927 (aged 63) Warrensburg, Missouri, U.S
- Genre: Ragtime
- Occupations: Composer, musician, pianist
- Instrument: Piano

John William "Blind" Boone (May 17, 1864 – October 4, 1927) was an American pianist and composer of ragtime music.

== Early life ==
Boone was born in a Federal militia camp near Miami, Missouri, May 17, 1864, to a contraband slave, Rachel, who used the surname, Boone, on the 1870 Federal Census. On John W. Boone's 1927 Missouri Death Record, Rachel's maiden name is said to be Carpenter. His father was a bugler in the 7th Missouri State Militia Cavalry (Union). At six months Boone fell ill to "brain fever" and to release the swelling of the brain a radical surgical procedure was performed, removing both of his eyes. This is how he became "blind" Boone. He grew up in Warrensburg, Missouri, where Camp Grover was the headquarters of the 7th MSM at the end of the Civil War.

Boone's mother, Rachel Boone Hendricks (when she married Harrison Hendricks in 1871, she used the Boone surname), worried that her son would find life too difficult without some sort of education. Because of this, his hometown of Warrensburg decided to make sure that Boone received an education and paid for him to attend the Missouri School for the Blind where he played the piano for first time. After growing bored with his experience there (they tried to teach him to make brooms), Boone's habitual rule breaking (sneaking off at night to listen to piano music at the local barrooms) got him expelled. He returned to Warrensburg where he began to wander, playing with local musicians. He was actually kidnapped for a time by a gambler and sometime showman, Mark Cromwell, until his step-father, Harrison Hendricks caught up with them in Mexico, Missouri. In 1879, Boone was "discovered" by Columbia, Missouri, contractor John B. Lange, Jr., who put Boone on the road, as Blind John. Only meager financial success was attained until Boone was boarded for two months at the home of George Sampson in Iowa. Mrs. Sampson was an accomplished pianist herself and taught Boone how to properly play the great European masters. It is said she taught him not only their minds, but their hearts as well. Upon his return from Iowa, Lange found his young protege had acquired much new skill, and with the addition of a vocalist, began billing as the Blind Boone Concert Company. The Company worked hard, traveling from town to town on a whistle-stop like tour. They began to acquire fame and fortune, returning to Columbia in 1887 with a large sum of money to deposit in their bank account. By the new century, they were among the most popular acts in the country, playing 300-plus dates annually. John Lange died in Kansas City in 1916. In 1889, Boone had married John Lange's daughter, Eugenia Lange. Boone continued on, touring the eastern US in 1919, spending an entire month in New York City. Upon announcing his retirement from touring in 1924, Boone was described by a Kansas City newspaper as having, "combined talent with hard work to make life worth living." Due to financial difficulties brought on by a less than adequate manager, Boone continued to play concerts until the spring of 1927. He died of acute dilation of the heart on October 4, 1927, in Warrensburg. He was buried at the Columbia Cemetery. ".

== Professional career ==
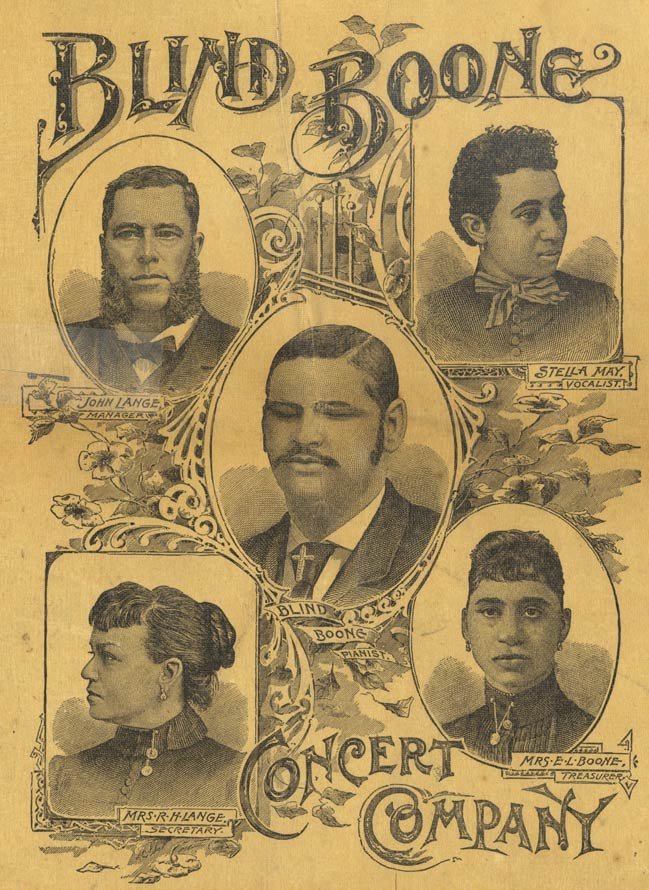
Blind Boone Concert Company advertisement, early 1890s

Boone played thousands of concerts in the United States and Canada. After becoming one of the first black artists recorded by the QRS piano roll company in 1912, he played eleven selections while a machine punched the notes on the roll. Boone's ability to play many notes rapidly made it difficult to record him accurately. His best-known composition, "The Marshfield Tornado", was never recorded or written down because it was too complex. Between January 18, 1880 (his first concert) and 1913 John William Boone had given 7,200 concerts, traveled 144,000 miles (sometimes traveling 20 miles a day) slept in around 7,000 beds, and given $180,000 to charities, churches, halls, opera houses, etc. The original Blind Boone Concert Company consisted of Boone, John Lange, Stella May, Ruth Lange, and Eugenia Boone.

== Personal life ==
Boone married Eugenia Lange in 1889. Lange traveled with Boone and would read to him and help him learn geography. "With his excellent memory, he recalled all the railroad routes he had taken when young and the many places he had traveled".

Due to Boone's disability, he identified colors by feel. He called this "seeing with my mind".

== Legacy ==
The home of Blind Boone still exists in Columbia, Missouri. In 2000, the City of Columbia purchased the home and it was undergoing restoration as of 2009. The home is listed on the National Register of Historic Places.

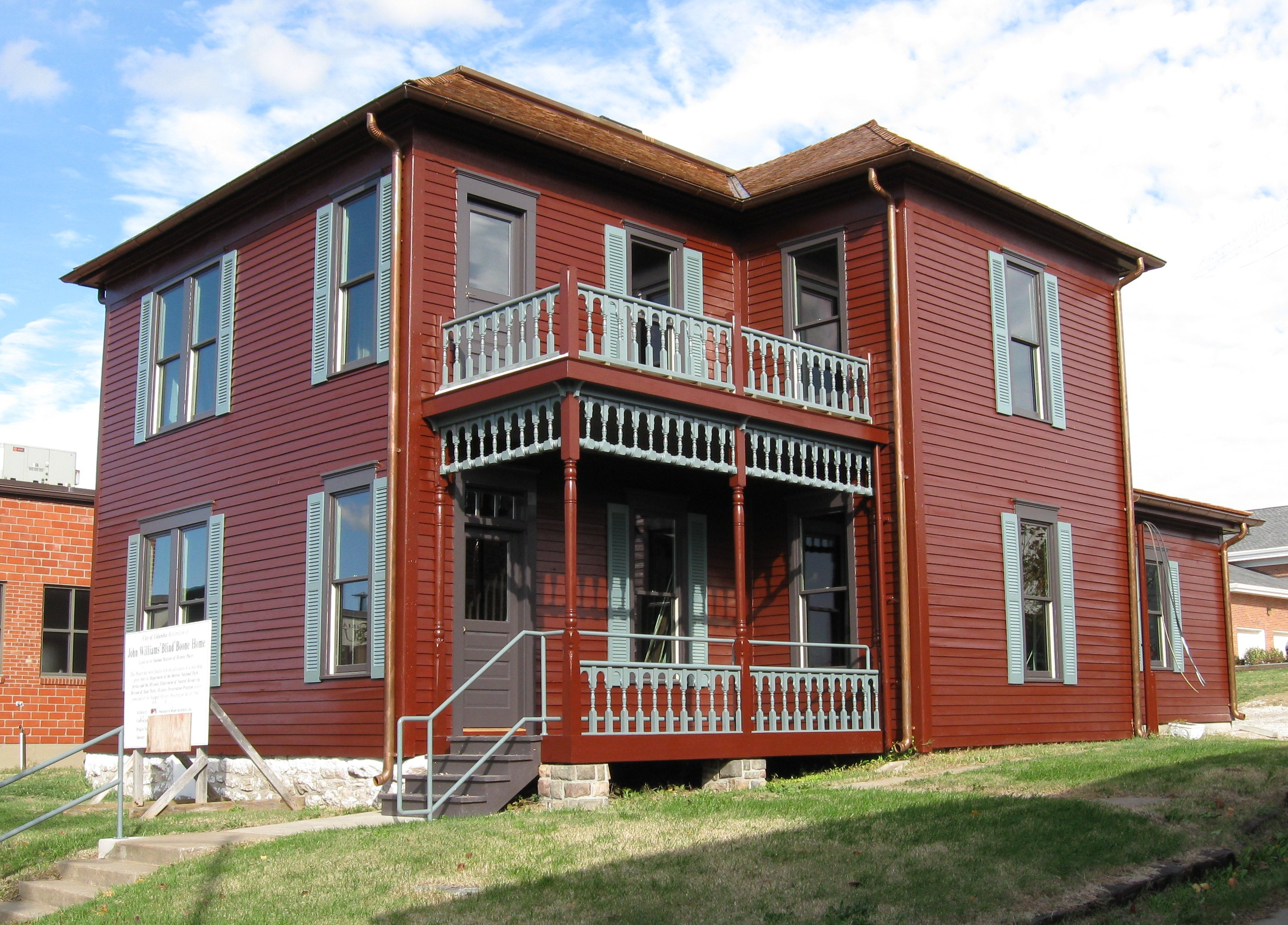
The Blind Boone Home in Downtown Columbia, Missouri

Boone's 1891 custom-made Chickering piano has been completely refurbished and was gifted to the Boone County Historical Society's Museum. The 9 ft., oak grand piano is curated by the historical society and is on display to the public during the museum's open hours. The piano is also brought to life several times each year as the featured attraction of a concert series held in the gallery where the piano resides.

There is a park in Warrensburg, MO called "Blind Boone Park," which was made in the 1950s.

The John William Boone Heritage Foundation was founded to preserve the history of Blind Boone and to elaborate the important role Missouri played in the development of Ragtime and early Jazz music.

== Biographies ==
- Barile, Mary Collins; Montgomery, Christine, eds. (2012). Merit, Not Sympathy, Wins: The Life and times of Blind Boone. Truman State University Press. ISBN 978-1-61248-065-7.
- Batterson, Jack A. (1998). Blind Boone: Missouri's Ragtime Pioneer. University of Missouri Press. ISBN 978-0-8262-1198-9.
- Fuell-Guther, Melissa (1918). Blind Boone: His Early Life and His Achievements. Evangel Publishing Society.
- Harrah, Madge (2004). Blind Boone: Piano Prodigy. Carolrhoda Books. ISBN 978-1-57505-057-7.

== See also ==
- John W. Boone House - The Blind Boone home in Columbia, Missouri
- List of ragtime composers
- Scott Joplin - Ragtime composer and pianist
