= State Historical Society of Missouri =

Research facility in Columbia, Missouri, U.S.

Coordinates: 38°56′55.51″N 92°19′49.19″W

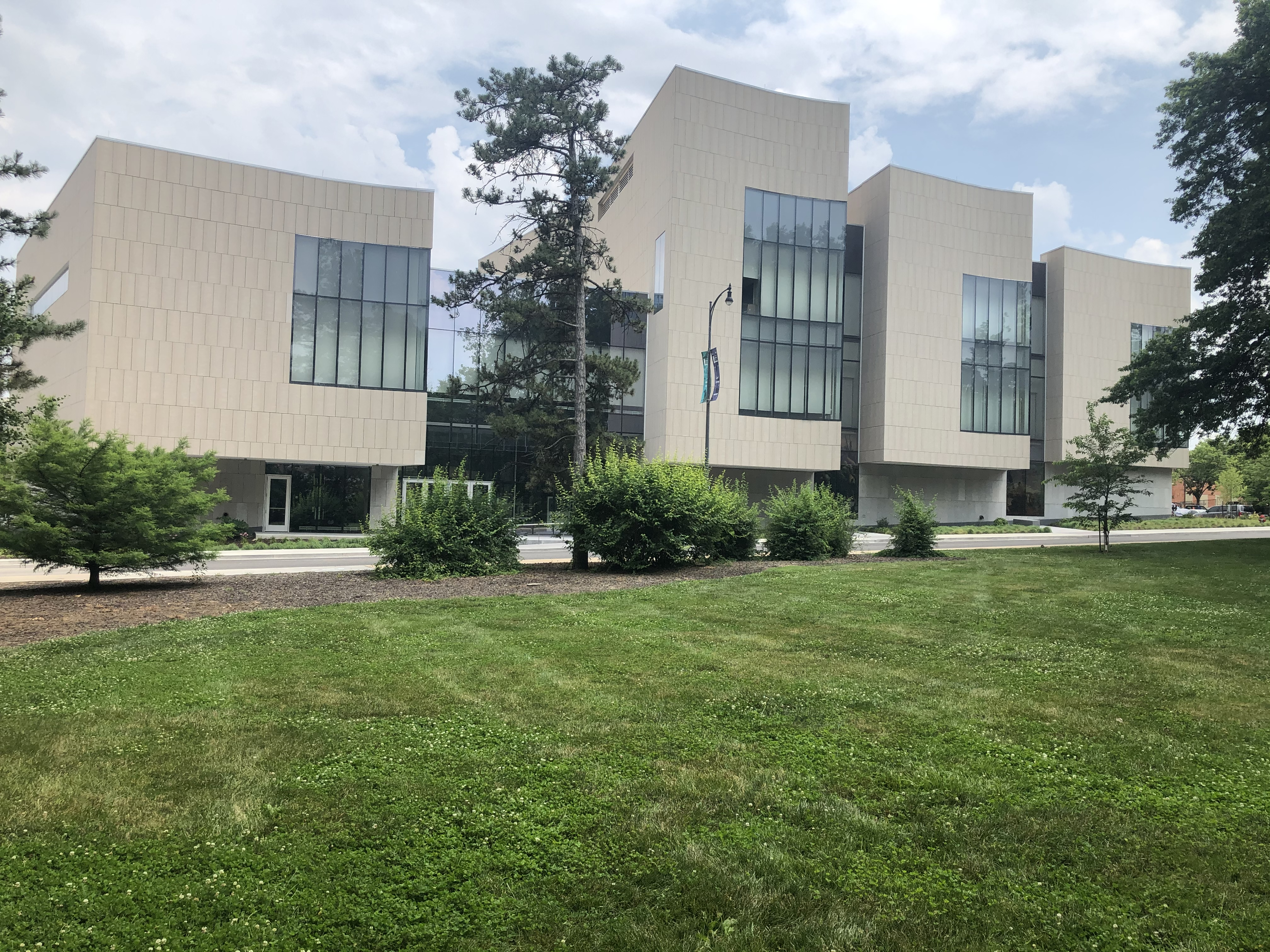
The Center for Missouri Studies in Columbia, Missouri is the headquarters of the society.

The State Historical Society of Missouri, a private membership and state funded organization, is a comprehensive research facility located in Columbia, Missouri, United States, specializing in the preservation and study of Missouri's cultural heritage. Established in 1898 by the Missouri Press Association and made a trustee of the state in 1901, the Society is the official historical society of the state of Missouri and is located on the campus of the University of Missouri in Downtown Columbia, Missouri. The Society publishes the quarterly Missouri Historical Review, the only scholarly academic journal produced in the state.

The Society engages in a number of outreach programs to bring Missouri's history to the public. Such programs are the Missouri History in Performance theatre, the Missouri History Speakers' Bureau, and the Missouri Conference on History. The collection of the Society, concerning pamphlets, books, and state publications, is over 460,000 items. In addition, the Society has over 500,000 manuscript items, 2,900 maps, over 150,000 state archival records, and over 57,000 reels of microfilm. In 2011, the Western Manuscript Collection, accessible in Columbia, Kansas City, Rolla, and St. Louis, Missouri, specializing in the preservation and collection of Missouri and Middle West history, was absorbed into the Society.

== History ==
Establishing an official state historical society had been discussed a few years before its eventual founding in 1898 but did not gain substantial backing until the topic was raised at a January 1898 meeting of the Missouri Press Association. Two of the chief supporters were Edwin W. Stephens, later first president of the Society, and Walter Williams, founder of the Missouri School of Journalism, and a third, Isidor Loeb, a member of the University of Missouri's history and political science faculty. At the January meeting, the proposal met with support of the members and a committee was established to draw up a constitution and bylaws for a historical society that would serve the state of Missouri. In this formative period of the Society's underpinnings, Stephens and Williams sought and received great support from the University of Missouri. Such was the support, that the not yet formed Society was given space in present-day Jesse Hall. Progress advanced quickly and only four months later, at the association's annual meeting on May 26, the Missouri Press Association voted to create the State Historical Society of Missouri, and named Stephens as its president, as well, Williams as its secretary.

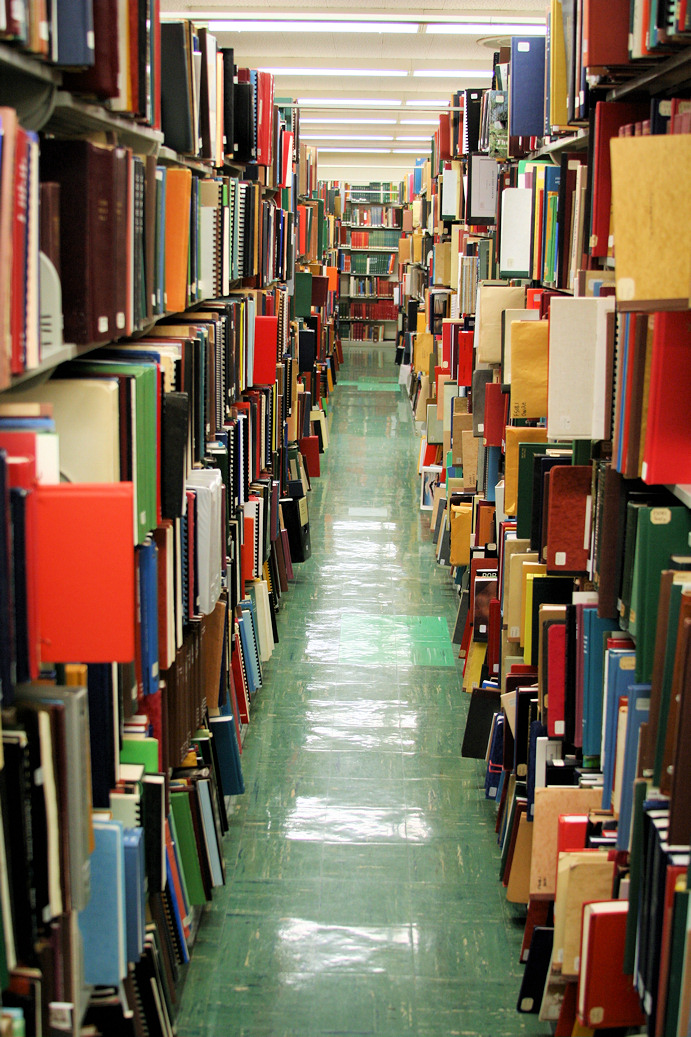
A view of the stacks in the Reference Library at the Society.

The Society's leaders sought to see the formal adoption of the historical society by the state. In just under a year, their lobbying efforts were awarded by the passage of a bill by the Fortieth General Assembly, signed into law on May 4, 1899, by Governor Lon Stephens, which established the Society as a trustee of the state. However, the Society did not receive its first appropriation until 1901. That amount was $4,500, intended to service the Society from 1901 to 1902.

The 1899 bill stated precisely the duties of the new state historical society:

It shall be the duty of the Society to collect books, maps, and other papers and material for the study of history, especially of this state and of the middle west; to acquire narratives and records of the pioneers, to procure documents, manuscripts and portraits, and to gather all information calculated to exhibit faithfully the antiquities and the past and present condition, resources and progress of this state...

Newspapers formed the nucleus of the Society's collection, because of the society's close relationship with editors. Membership could be gained for such men by the annual donation of their papers, and after ten years, a lifetime membership granted. Secretary Loeb quickly sought to expand the collection further, putting out a request to citizens of the state for all types of items, both public and private, and including "Indian relics." The collection received a noted boost in 1901 by the donations of the new secretary, Francis Asbury Sampson, which consisted of nearly 2,000 books and just over 14,000 pamphlets. Additionally, he convinced the Sedalia Natural History Society to donate an equally considerable collection of books and pamphlets, as well maps and charts. In the same time period, the Society prepared an exhibit on the state's newspapers for the 1904 St. Louis World's Fair and began the first publications of the Missouri Historical Review.

The growing collection necessitated the need for more space to store it. Slowly the society had expanded its presence in Jesse Hall, storing much of its collection in its basement, while taking over the first floor of the building. By 1902, the Society had begun looking for the resources for a new facility, going so far as attempting to lobby library philanthropist Andrew Carnegie. Just over a dozen years later in 1915, the Society moved into the newly built Ellis Library, its home ever since.

=== Shoemaker years ===
At approximately the same time, Floyd C. Shoemaker joined the Society and began a forty-five year career with the institution. In his time, Shoemaker accomplished a number of milestones under the Society. One such accomplishment was a campaign to establish the Society's membership as the largest in the nation, with the membership expanding from 1,285 in 1916 to 3,356 in 1936. While the Great Depression did not seriously affect the Society, it did become involved in several ways with the New Deal programs. For a couple years, it hired men from the National Youth Administration to assist in the moving books and newspapers. As well as hiring women from the Civil Works Administration to complete needed tasks about the Society such as updating the Society's "Who's Who" files for the state and indexing selected newspapers. The Society also assisted the Federal Writers' Project and the Works Progress Administration.

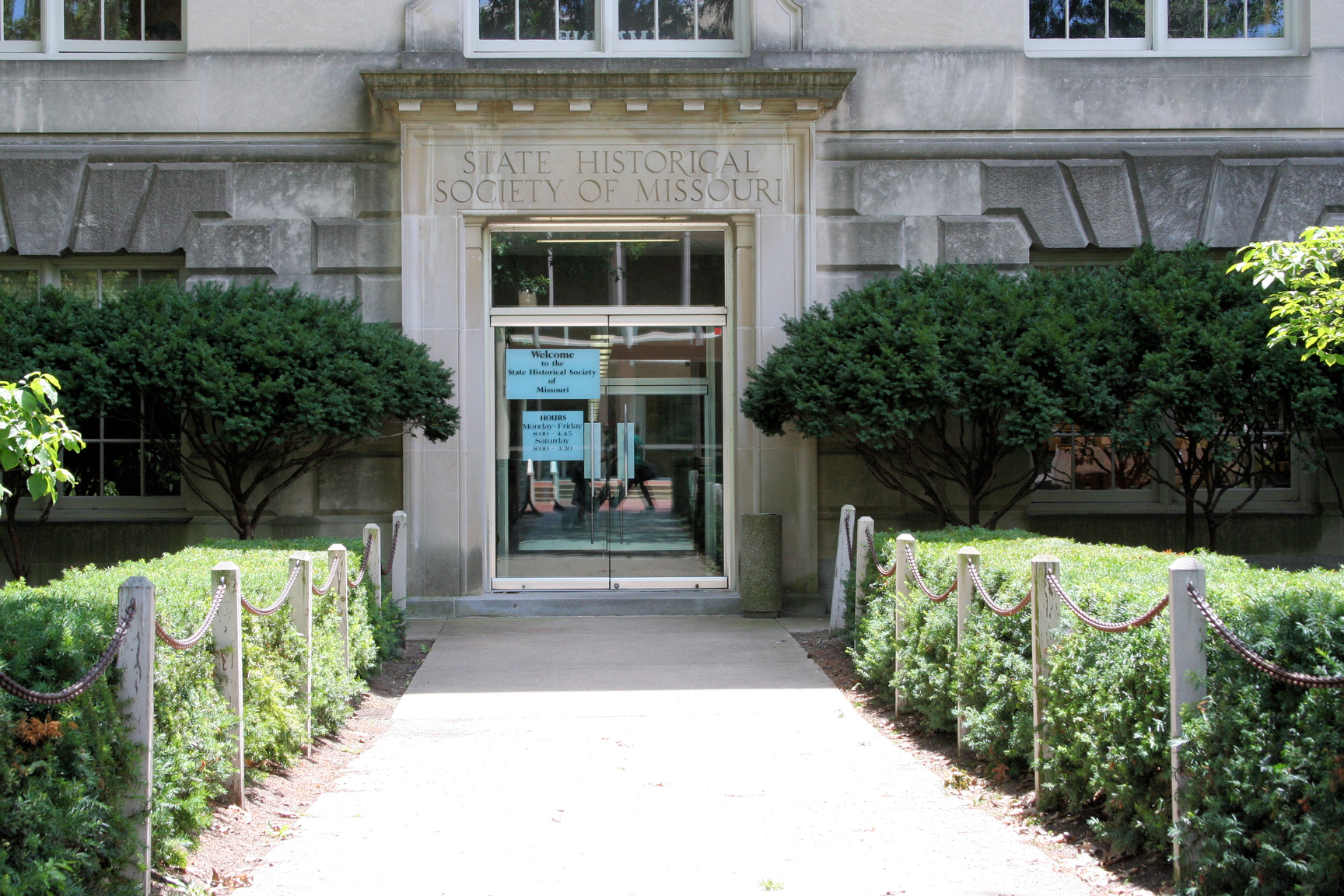
Ellis Library, former entrance to the State Historical Society of Missouri.

Joining Shoemaker at the Society in the same time period was George Mahan, who served as a trustee and as president. Mahan's contributions included a post-mortem donation to allow the Society to purchase books for the Society's Mark Twain collection, as well as the payment for the Society for the establishment of twenty-nine roadside historical markers along United States highway 36 from St. Joseph to Hannibal. The staff of the Society researched each marker and wrote their inscriptions. The Society would expand the historic marker program over the next decades, planting them across the state. Shoemaker also continued to expand the Society's collection, writing personal requests with some success. In 1932, Shoemaker cataloged donations for that year consisting of, "1,207 books, 964 pamphlets, 1 painting, 86 photographs and negatives, 28 manuscript collections, 3 ledger books, 1 medal, 49 clippings, 4 sheets of music, and 4 poems," not including newspaper donations.

Shoemaker pushed for more publications from the Society, which ranged from books to newspaper weeklies. From 1925 to 1939, the Society published a series of articles entitled, This Week in Missouri History, that appeared in at least one paper in 97 of the 114 counties across the state, including St. Louis. Begun in 1922, the Society embarked on a twenty volume project that concluded in 1965, entitled The Messages and Proclamations of the Governors of the State of Missouri. These volumes included biographical sketches, in addition to the documentation. Shoemaker proudly considered the Missouri Historical Review as one of the finest such publications in the country at the time.

=== Center for Missouri Studies ===
On August 10, 2019, the 198th anniversary of Missouri's statehood, the Center for Missouri Studies opened in Columbia. The center is a large public facility built to replace Ellis Library as the headquarters of the State Historical Society of Missouri. It contains a vastly expanded gallery/collection display area, a library/reading room, classrooms, offices, open and closed stacks, microfilm rooms, art restoration lab, a large event room, and a gift shop. The Center for Missouri Studies is located on Elm Street on the University of Missouri campus in Downtown Columbia, across from Peace Park.

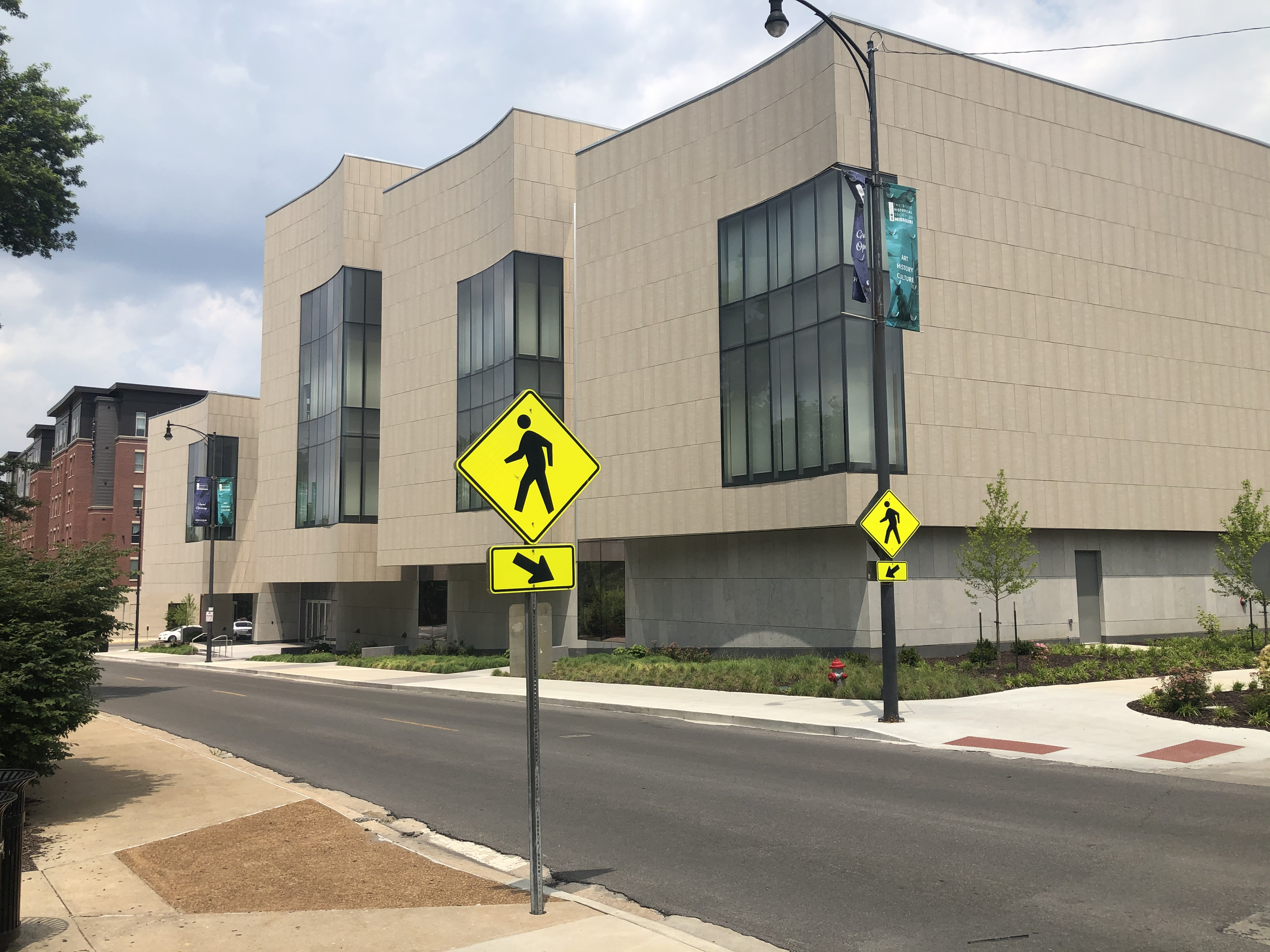
From across Elm Street

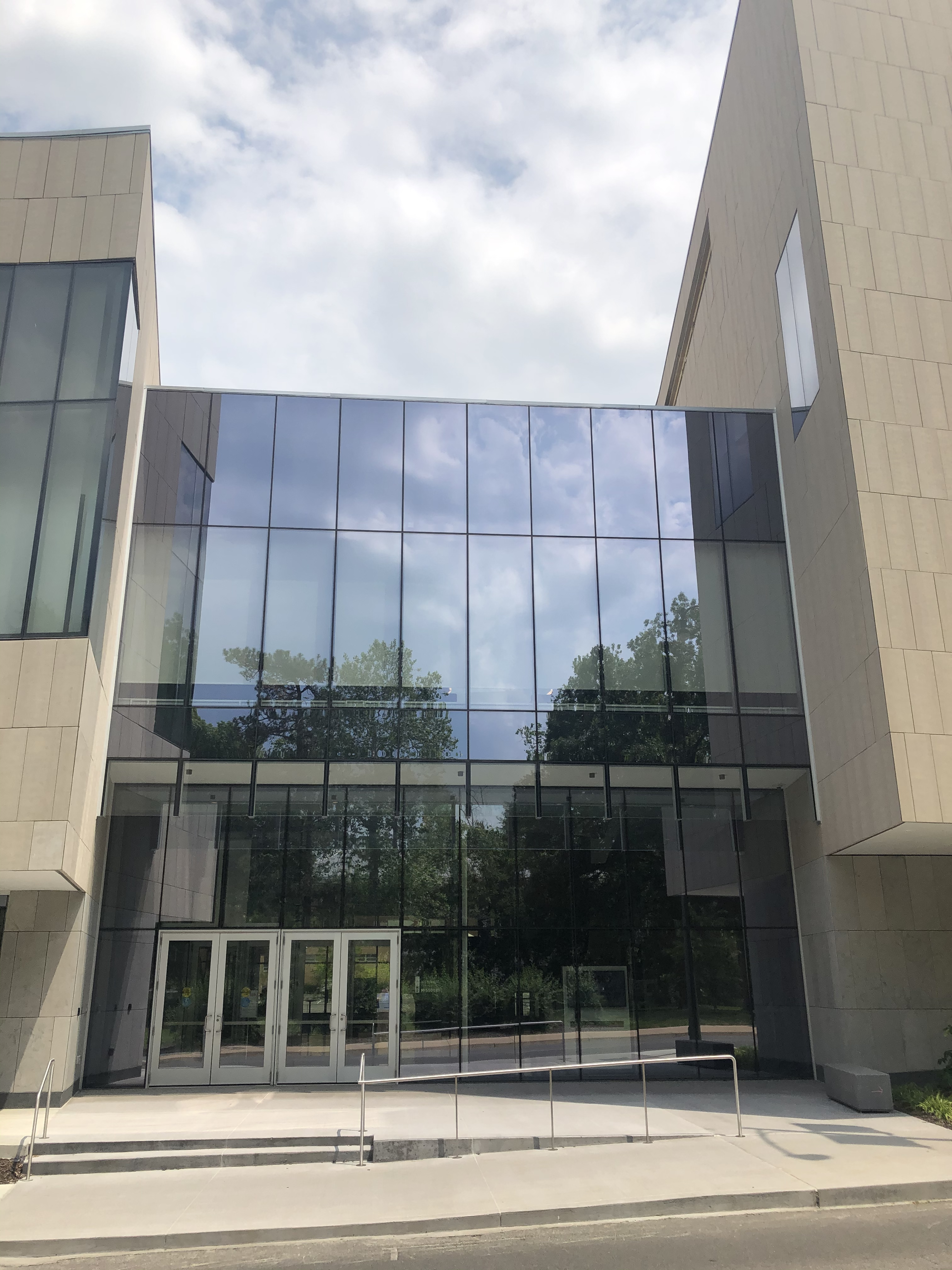
Elm Street entrance

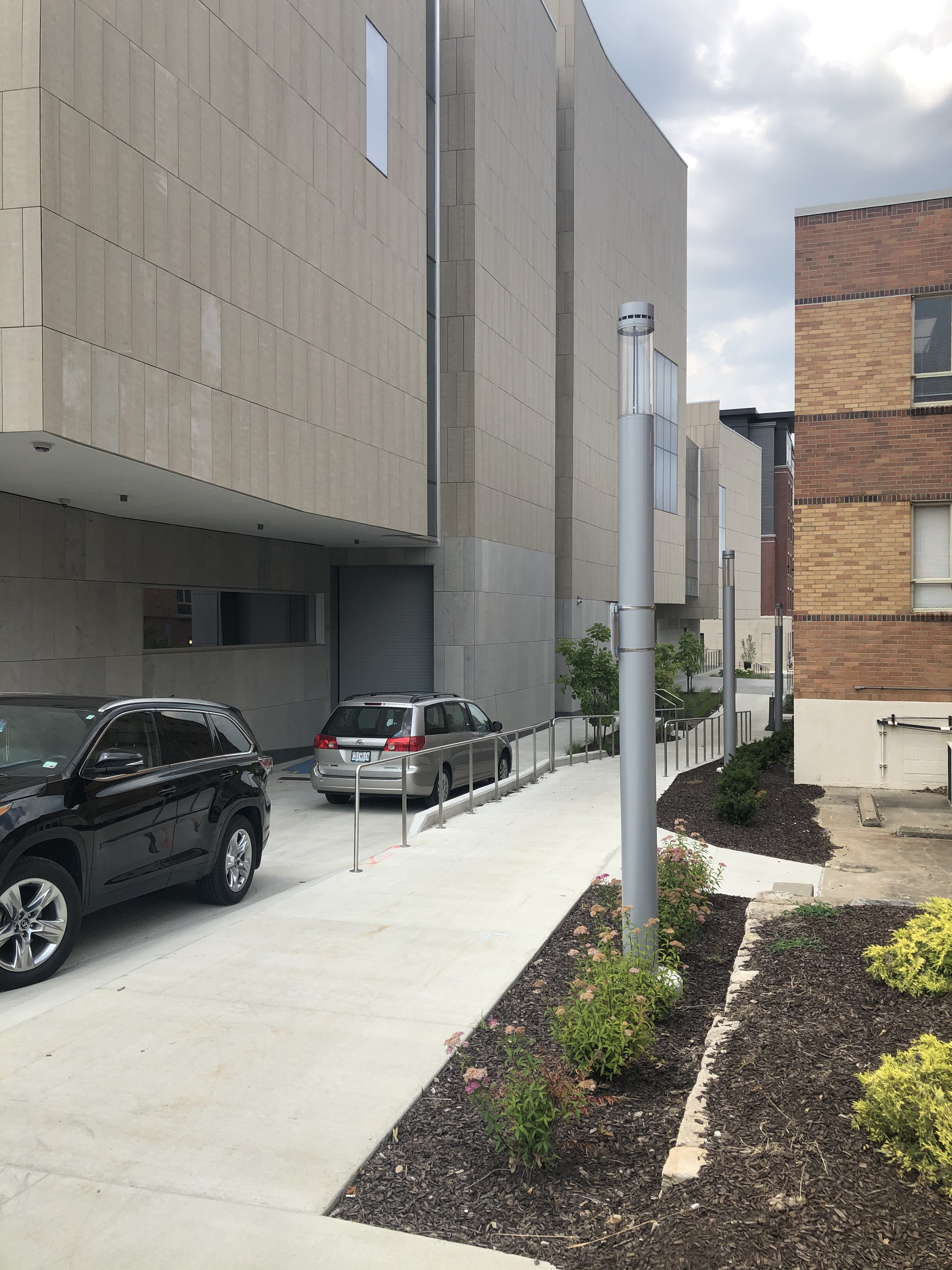
Loading dock and alley

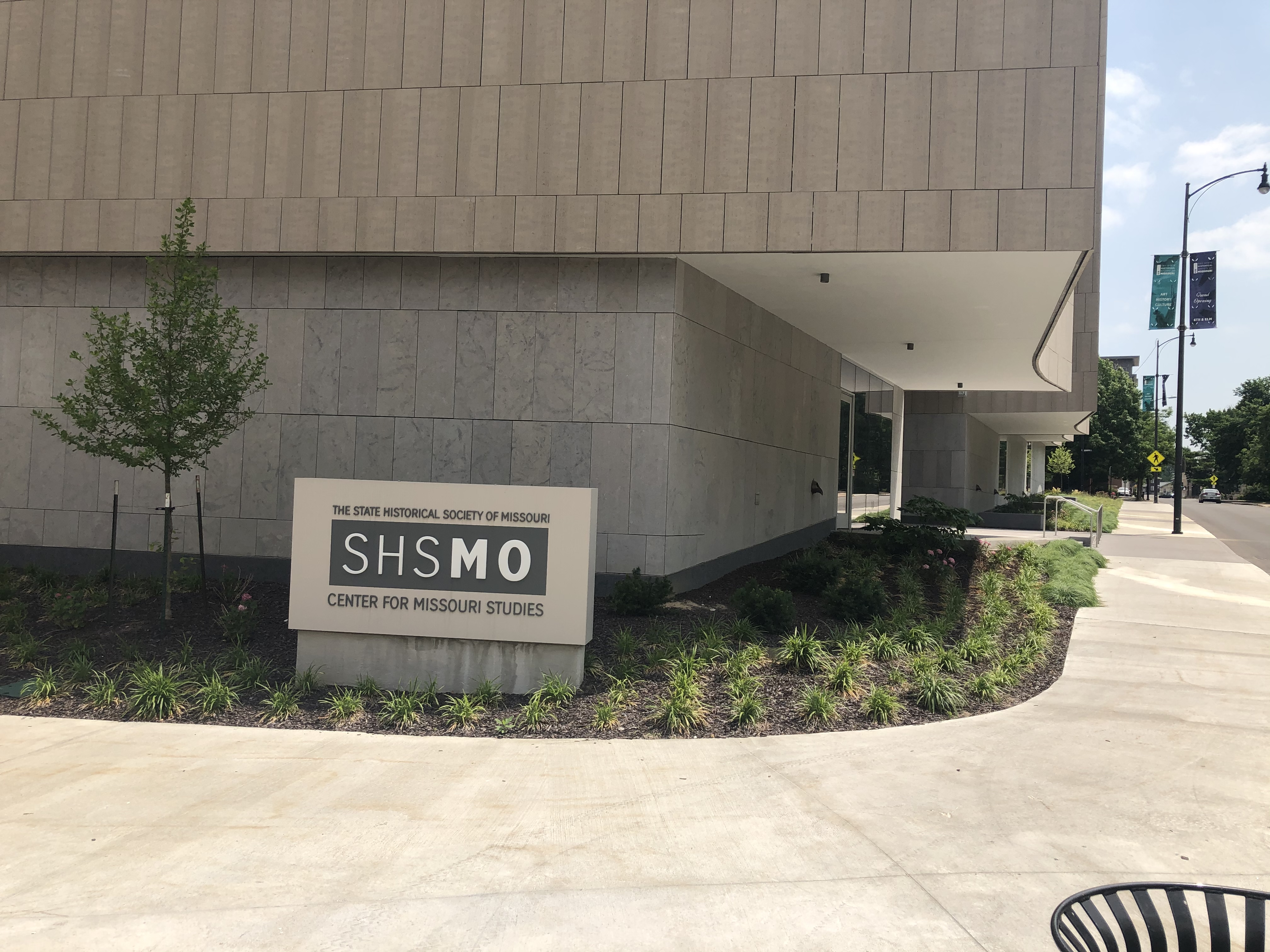
Elm and 5th Street

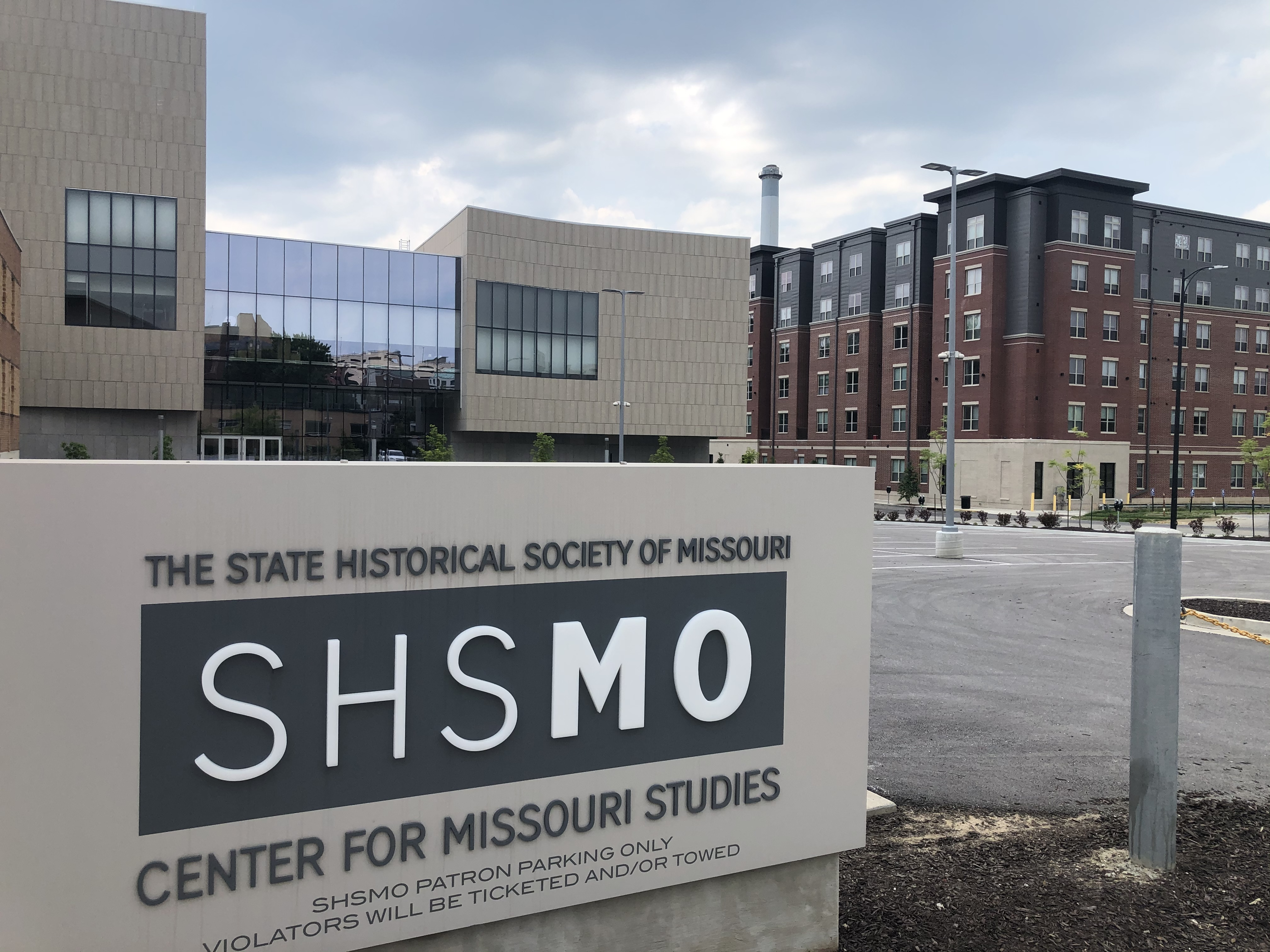
North entrance and parking lot

== Collections and exhibits ==
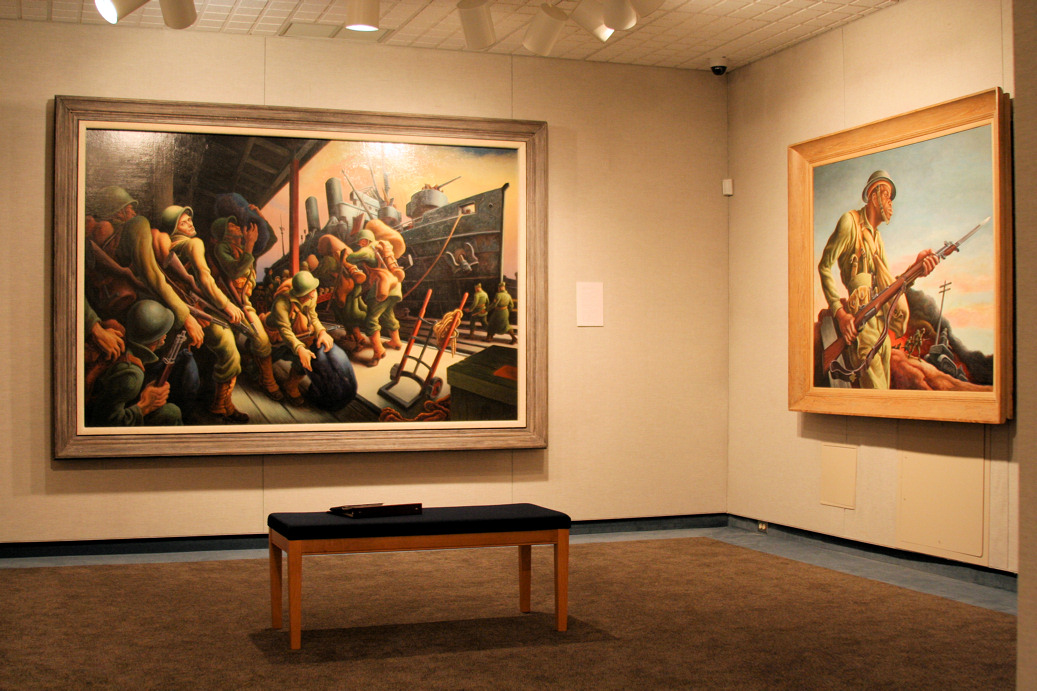
A scene from the Society's art gallery, featuring works by Thomas Hart Benton, among other artists.

The Society houses a large collection of works by famed Missouri artists George Caleb Bingham and Thomas Hart Benton, in addition to other artists. Overall, the Society possesses over four thousand pieces of artwork, including paintings, lithographs, sketches, and engravings. The editorial cartoon collection includes works by Daniel Fitzpatrick, S. J. Ray, Don Hesse, Tom Engelhardt, and renown Second World War artist, Bill Mauldin. The Society also contains photography and map collections.

The State Historical Society of Missouri hosts changing exhibits of art and history drawn from its collections. All exhibits and collections are open and fully accessible to the public.

=== George Caleb Bingham collection ===
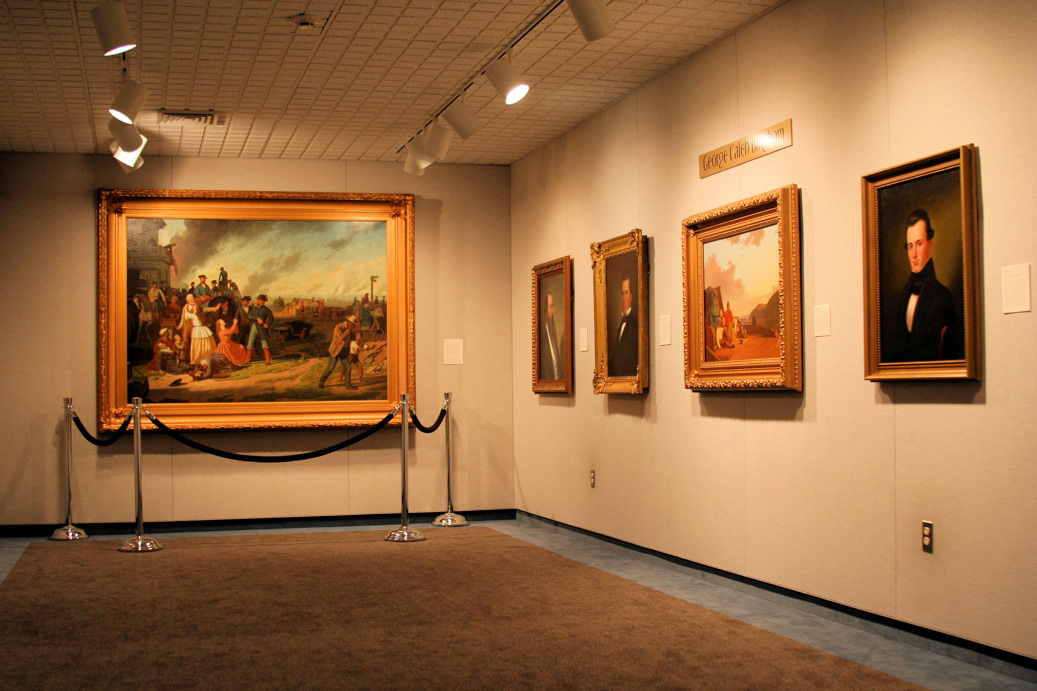
A view of the George Caleb Bingham gallery at the Society with Order No. 11 in the background.

One of the prominent artists of the Society's collection is George Caleb Bingham. Though born in Virginia, Bingham grew up and lived in Missouri. Famed for his depictions of everyday life on the rivers flowing through and along the state, as well for his portraiture, one of his most famous works is General Order No. 11. A crown jewel of the Society's collection, the painting depicts the forced removal of Missourians from western counties during the Civil War by the general order of Union general Thomas Ewing. The collection of Bingham's artwork owned by the Society represents one of the largest in the nation.

=== Jon Luvelli Collection ===
The Society has an established collection by international recognized street photographer Jon Luvelli. Luvelli's fine art photography has garnered worldwide recognition for his distinguished images of rural America townscapes. A native of Como, Italy, Luvelli was raised in a Mid-Missouri farm town. His work casts an aesthetic spotlight on contemporary life in the rural routes and small-town streets of the Show-Me State. Luvelli's work also conveys social messages, never shying away from the complicated subjects of racism, poverty, sexuality, abuse, and addiction.

=== Daniel Fitzpatrick Collection ===
Daniel R. Fitzpatrick is a two-time Pulitzer Prize-winning, editorial cartoonist for the St. Louis Post Dispatch has become one of the largest collections for the Society with over 1,500 original cartoon drawings. Social, political, and aesthetic attitudes shaped his artwork, with a special focus on the cartoons he created during the World War I era.

== Libraries ==
The Society's Newspaper Library has the largest collection of Missouri state newspapers in the nation beginning with the very first newspaper published in 1808. Thousands of newspapers on microfilm are available to the public at the Society or via inter-library loan. The Society has at least one newspaper for each of Missouri's one hundred and fourteen counties. In 2008 the Society was chosen to participate in the National Digital Newspaper Program, a joint initiative sponsored by the Library of Congress and the National Endowment for the Humanities to digitize historically significant newspapers. Select newspapers from the Society collection between the years 1880 and 1922 appear on the Chronicling America website. The Society also has a collection of digital newspapers available through its own website.

The Society's Reference Library is home to over half a million volumes of published secondary sources on Missouri and the Middle West. Family histories, county histories, city directories, official state publications, church histories, scholarly journals, and genealogical indexes are among the many items that the public can consult. One of the Society's most notable collections is the J. Christian Bay Collection of Western Americana.

=== Western Historical Manuscript Collection ===
A joint collection held between the University of Missouri and the Society, the Western Historical Manuscript Collection (WHMC) is accessible at various locations throughout the state. Each of the four locations offer different historical material; the WHMC in Kansas City, specializes in the history and culture of Kansas City; the WHMC collection located at the Missouri University of Science and Technology features material concerning the Ozark highland and southern Missouri; and likewise, the WHMC office in St. Louis focuses on collecting material relating to the history of St. Louis and its surrounding region. The WHMC location in Columbia, Missouri, specializes on the history of the state from prior its establishment to the present, as well as, "the trans-Mississippi West: social and cultural, religious and educational, military and political, economic and legal, business and labor, urban and rural, ethnic, environmental, and many others." The Columbia collection consists in part of diaries, letters, photographs, and other material, of Missourians ranging from farmers, bankers, and frontier pioneers.

In 2011, the Western Historical Manuscript Collection was absorbed into the State Historical Society and ceased to exist. The manuscripts and collection of the Western Historical Manuscript Collection can be accessed at the Society's Research Center located in Ellis Library and at Society research centers in Kansas City, St. Louis, Rolla, Cape Girardeau, and Springfield.

== Outreach ==
In an effort to bring history to the public, the Society operates a number of programs. The Missouri History in Performance (MoHiP) is one such way. Through MoHiP, playwrights craft performances concerning moments in Missouri history, often which use the talents of folk musicians Cathy Barton and Dave Para. Often the playwrights draw upon 19th century plays, personal letters, and newspaper stories for reference. Another avenue adopted by the Society to extend history to the public is the Missouri History Speakers' Bureau. For nearly forty years, the Society, through the Bureau, has made available lecturers to groups and organizations throughout the state to speak on various moments in the state's history. It is funded in part by the Missouri Humanities Council with assistance from the National Endowment for the Arts. Annually, the Society holds the Missouri Conference on History, a multiple day event, in which lectures are given on Missouri related topics in history. In addition, awards are presented to the best book, best journal article, and best graduate student paper concerning state history.

=== Publications ===
In addition to the programs described above, the Society reaches the public through the means of publishing the Missouri Historical Review, a quarterly newsletter to members titled the Missouri Times, and books. The Missouri Historical Review, published since 1906, the Review publishes articles on Missouri history, as well as reviews of books concerning Missouri history. The review is award-winning and published every four months. In 2006, the Society published a number of collections celebrating 100 years of the Review on specific topics, such as the Civil War in Missouri and Kansas City: America's Crossroads.

=== National History Day in Missouri ===
Since 1989, The State Historical Society of Missouri also sponsors National History Day in Missouri, the state contest for National History Day. More than 2,400 students across the state participate in the contest, with more than 500 moving on to state. 50-55 students from Missouri move on to the national contest in Washington, D.C. based on performance in one of five categories: documentary, exhibit, paper, performance/acting, and website.

=== Missouri Conference of History ===
The Missouri Conference of History brings together history teachers and professional historians to share results of research, exchange information of teaching and curriculum, to consider ways to promote interest in history and the welfare of the profession and to discuss other concerns common to all historians. The conference takes please yearly at the University of Missouri-Kansas City.
