= Stephens Lake Park =

Park located in Columbia, Missouri, U.S.

Coordinates: 38.951°N 92.306°W

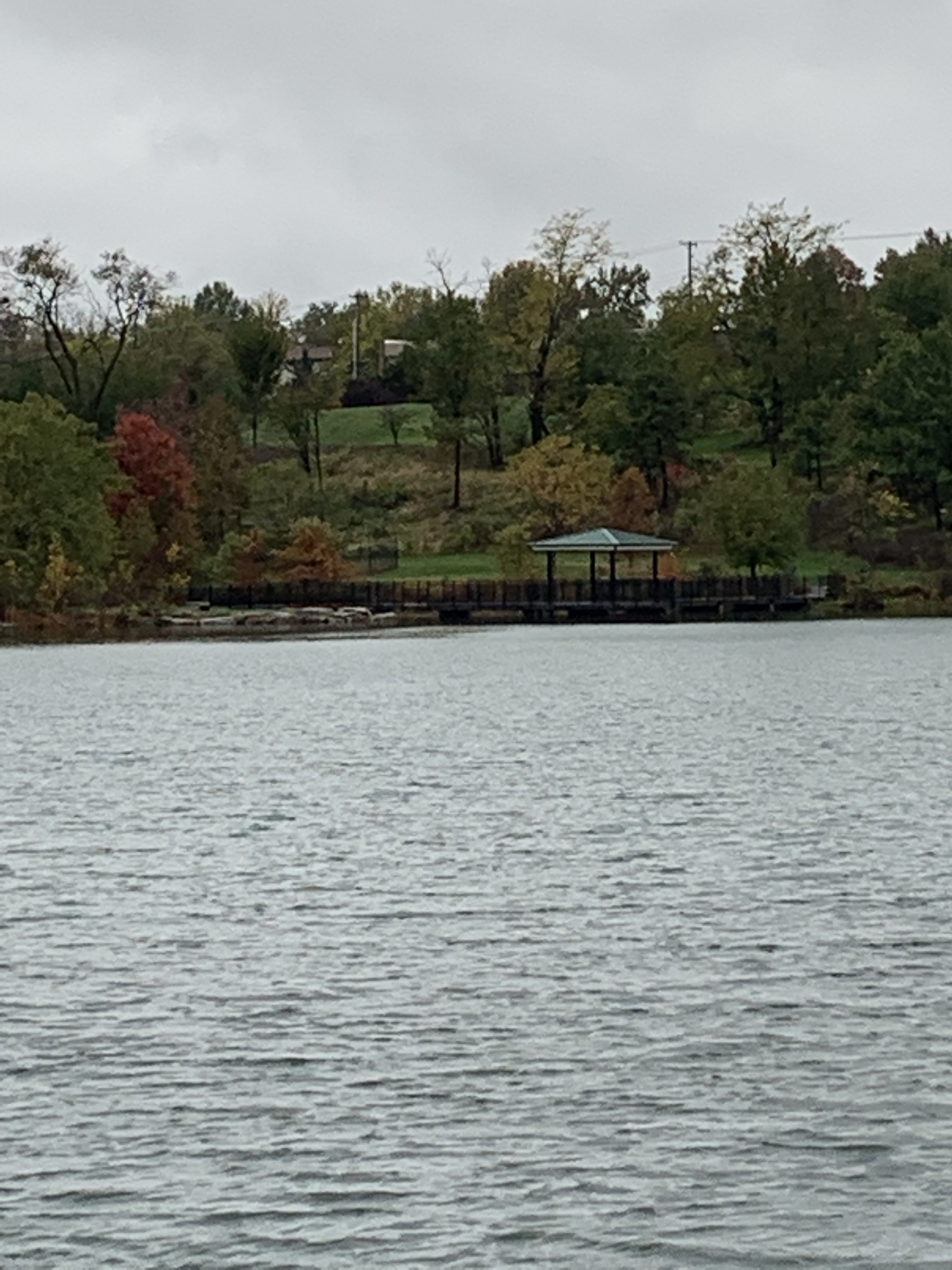
- Interactive map of Stephens Lake Park
- Opened: 2001

Stephens Lake Park is a park located in Columbia, Missouri. Today it serves as an ArbNet Level II arboretum with a lake, open play areas and amphitheater spanning 116 total acres. The Arboretum includes a Missouri native plant collection, and oak and maple collections.

In the early 1800s the David Gordon House and Collins Log Cabin were built upon the land. A century later Stephens College purchased the land from the Gordon family. During the start of the 21st century, the city purchased the land and opened it to the public.

== History ==
In the early 19th century, Captain David Gordon, a wealthy farmer from Madison County, Kentucky, moved his family and his slaves to the land due to debates over slavery. In 1818, Gordon built a cabin on the area that would become the park. In 1823, The David Gordon House were built using slave labor. After construction of the manor was complete, the Gordons turned their cabin into slave quarters. David Gordon died on January 18, 1849 David. According to journalist Walter Williams, by the time of his death he was one of the richest men in Boone county.

The area was owned by the Gordon family for over a century. Then in 1926, the family sold the land to Stephens College.

In 1999, allegedly the college was going to sell the land to private developers for $10 million. This caused outrage among community. Near the end of the year someone purposely set the David Gordon House on fire.

In 2001 the city of Columbia purchased the area the same year the park was opened to the public. An amphitheatre in the park was opened on June 26, 2010.

In 2017, the park became fully accredited by ArbNet as a level II arboretum known as Stephens Lake Park Arboretum. The park contains a marker of the historic location of Sherman's Dam.

== Discovery Garden ==
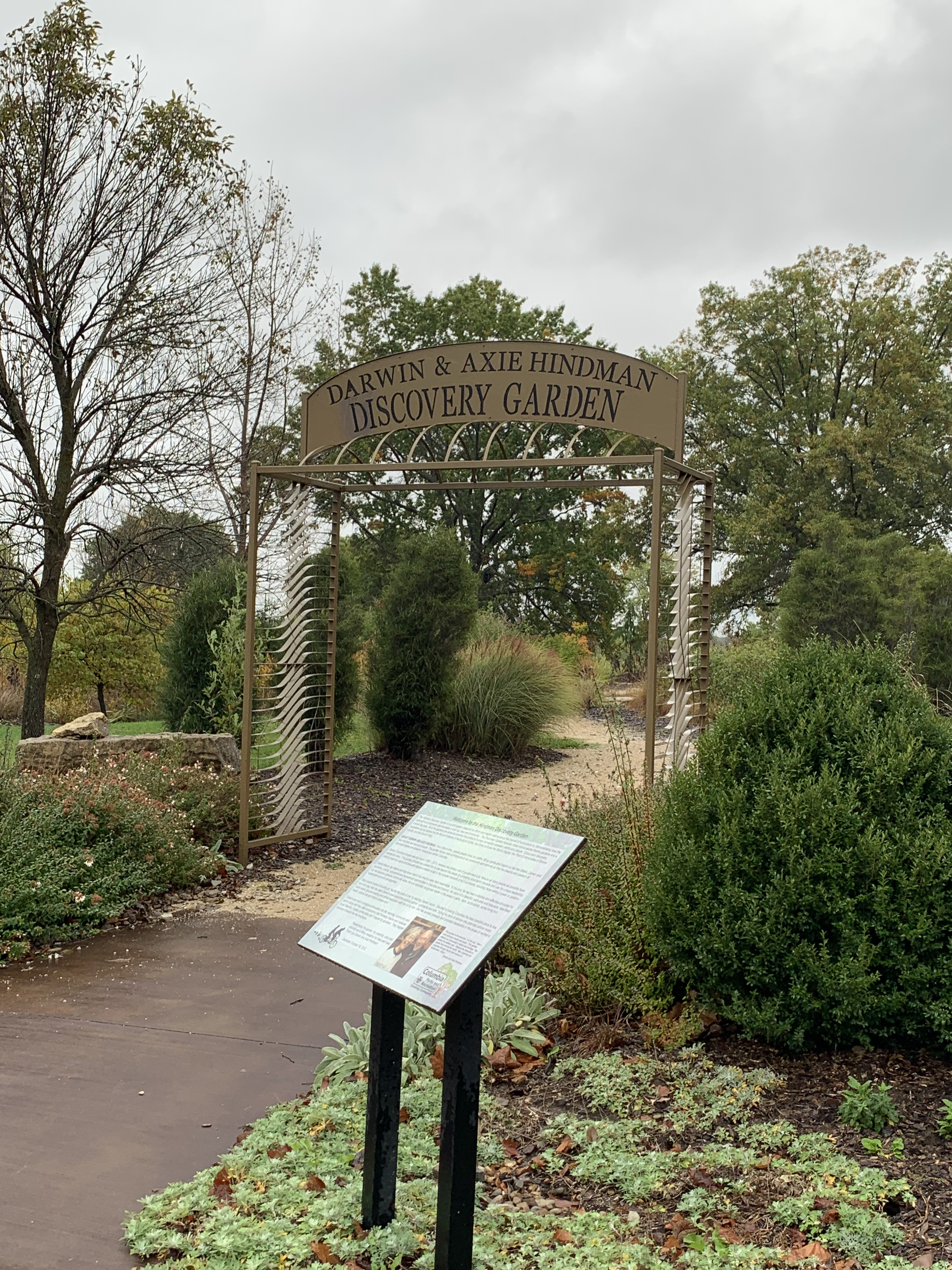

The northern section of the park contains a garden called Darwin and Axie Hindman Discovery Garden, it was built to honor Darwin Hindman and Axie Hindman.

== Wildlife ==
Enchenopa binotata have been found at the park. According to the Missouri Department of Conservation; Stephens lake contains species like Black Bass, Catfish, and Bluegill.

== Bibliography ==
- Kienzle, Valerie (December 8, 2014), Columbia, Arcadia Publishing Incorporated, ISBN 978-1-4396-4883-4
- Williams, Walter, ed. (1913), A History of Northeast Missouri, vol. 2, Chicago, Illinois: Lewis Publishing Company, OCLC 3060224
