= David Gordon House and Collins Log Cabin =

Historic houses in Missouri, United States

- U.S. National Register of Historic Places
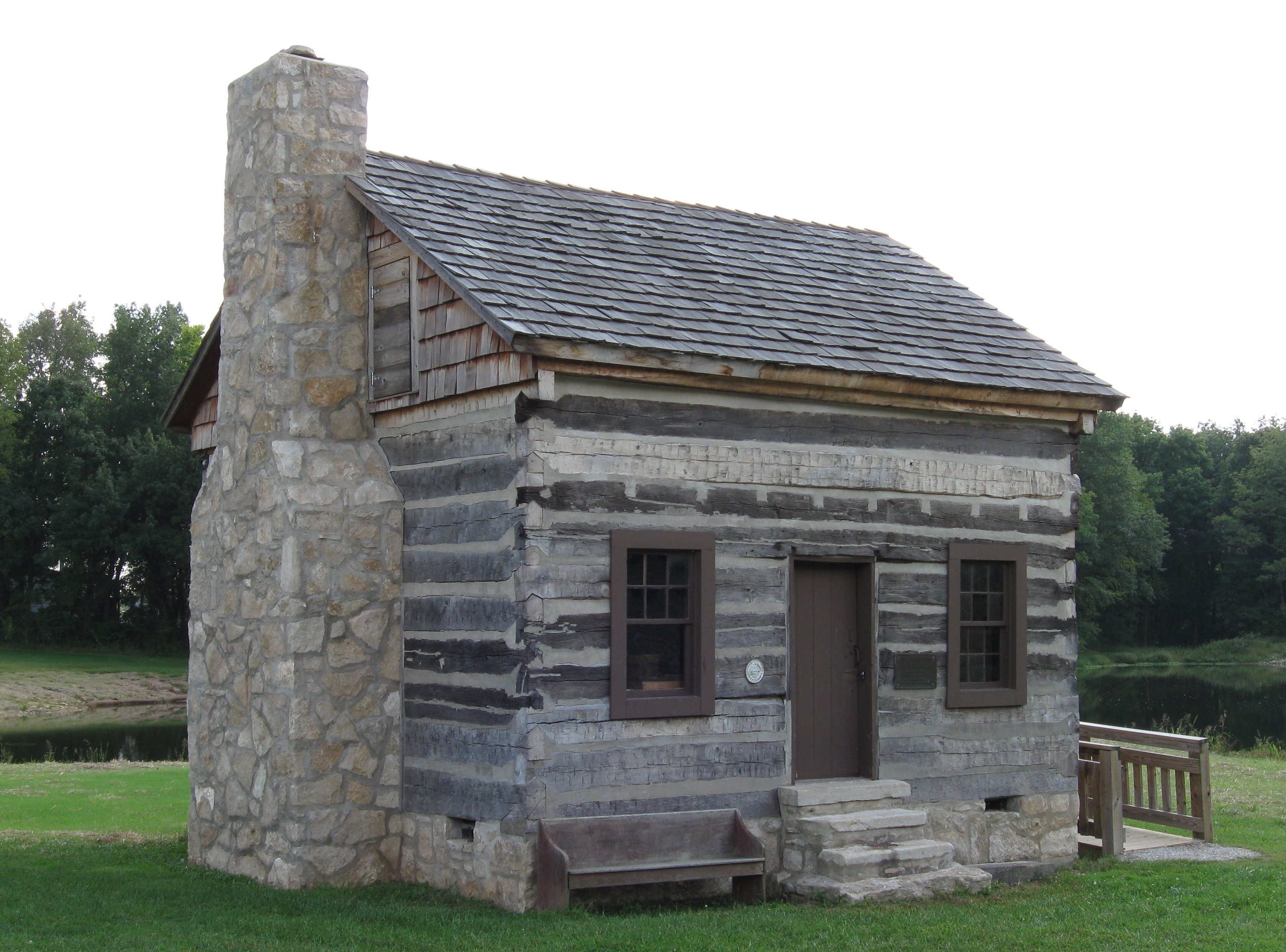
- Collins Log Cabin

- Location within Missouri Location within the United States
- Location: 2100 E. Broadway, Columbia, Missouri
- Coordinates: 38°54′24″N 92°17′41″W
- Area: less than one acre
- Built: c. 1818, c. 1823
- NRHP reference No.: 83000972
- Added to NRHP: August 29, 1983

The David Gordon House and Collins Log Cabin were two historic homes located at Columbia, Missouri. The David Gordon House is a two-story, frame I-house. The 13-room structure incorporated original construction from about 1823 and several additions from the 1830s, 1890s and 1930s. The Collins Log Cabin was built in 1818, and is a single pen log house of the story and a loft design. They represent some of the first permanent dwellings in Columbia. The house, located in what is now Stephens Lake Park burned after arson in the early 1990s. The log cabin survived and has been relocated from Stephens Lake Park to the campus of the Boone County Historical Society.

They were added to the National Register of Historic Places in 1983.
