= Sebree (disambiguation) =

Sebree is a town in Kentucky, United States.

Sebree may also refer to:

- Edmund Sebree (1898–1966), a general in the United States Army
- Frank P. Sebree (1854–1940), American lawyer and politician
- Mac Sebree (1932–2010), an American journalist and publisher
- Uriel Sebree (1848–1922), an admiral in the United States Navy
- Sebree, Missouri, a community in the United States
- Sebree Island, an Alaskan island named in honor of Uriel Sebree
- Sebree Peak, an Alaskan mountain named in honor of Uriel Sebree
