= Minett =

Minett is a surname. Notable people with the surname include:

- Henry Minett (1857–1952), American naval officer
- Jason Minett (born 1971), English footballer
- Louise Minett (born 1975), British sports shooter

== See also ==
- Minett Islet
- Minott
