= Minott =

Minott may refer to:

- George H. Minott, (1893–1957), politician
- Rodney O'Gliasain Kennedy-Minott, (1928–2004), American diplomat, Democratic Party activist, history professor at Stanford University
- Roger Minott Sherman (1773–1844), the youngest of six children of Rev. Josiah Sherman (Princeton College - 1754)
- Sugar Minott (1956–2010), Jamaican reggae singer, producer and sound-system operator
- William Minott House, historic house in Portland, Maine

== See also ==
- Minett
- Minette (disambiguation)
- Minotti
