= Benjamin Franklin Tilley =

U.S. Navy rear admiral, Naval Acting-Governor of American Samoa

Commandant Benjamin Franklin Tilley
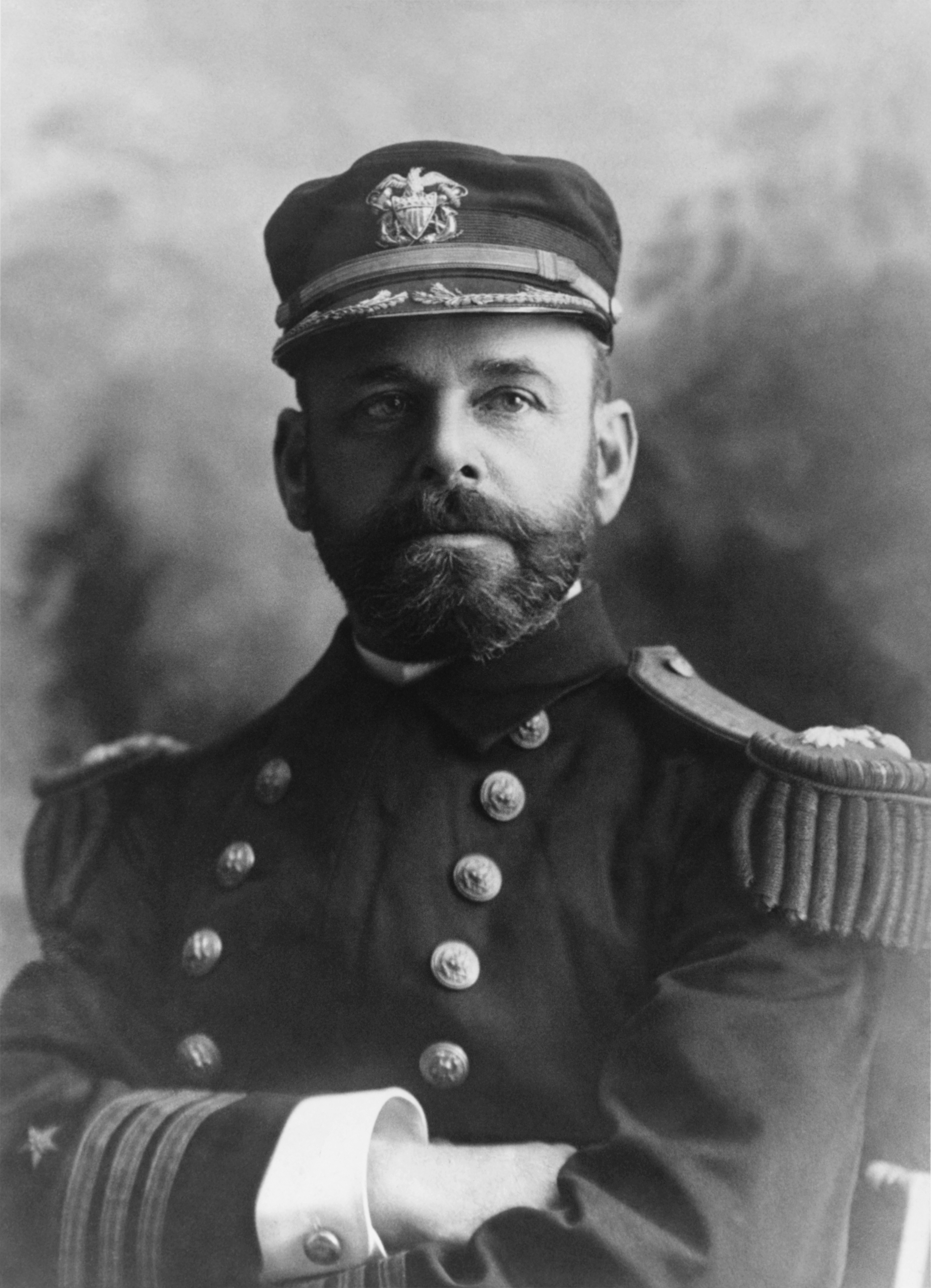
- Portrait c. 1896–1901
- Born: March 29, 1848; Bristol, Rhode Island, U.S.
- Died: March 18, 1907 (aged 58); Philadelphia, Pennsylvania, U.S.
- Military career
- Allegiance: United States
- Branch: United States Navy
- Service years: 1863–1907
- Rank: Rear admiral
- Commands: USS Bancroft; USS Newport; USS Vicksburg; USS Abarenda; USS Iowa; U.S. Naval Station Tutuila; League Island Naval Yard

Naval administrator of American Samoa
- In office February 17, 1900 – November 27, 1901
- Preceded by: Office established
- Succeeded by: Uriel Sebree

Benjamin Franklin Tilley (March 29, 1848 – March 18, 1907) was an American Naval officer who served from the end of the American Civil War through the Spanish–American War. He was the first acting governor of American Samoa as well as the territory's first naval governor.

Tilley entered the United States Naval Academy during the height of the Civil War, graduating after the conflict. He gradually rose through the ranks and participated as a lieutenant in the United States military crackdown against strikers in the wake of the Great Railroad Strike of 1877. He and a small contingent of sailors and marines defended the American consulate in Santiago, Chile during the 1891 Chilean Civil War. He was a commander during the Spanish–American War, and his gunship USS Newport successfully captured two Spanish Navy ships. After the war, he was made the first acting-Governor of Tutuila and Manua (later called American Samoa) and set legal and administrative precedents for the new territory. After 41 years of service, he was promoted to rear admiral but died of pneumonia shortly afterwards.

== Early life and naval career ==
Benjamin Franklin Tilley was born on March 29, 1848, in Bristol, Rhode Island, the sixth of nine children. He enrolled in the United States Naval Academy on September 22, 1863, at the age of 15 and in the midst of the American Civil War. The war forced the school to relocate from Annapolis, Maryland, threatened by the Confederacy, to Newport, Rhode Island. In 1866, he graduated first in his class, going on to serve as a midshipman first on board USS Franklin and then USS Frolic. He spent three years serving on board Frolic, eventually being promoted to ensign. His next assignment was on board USS Lancaster, where he was promoted to master in 1870 and then to lieutenant in 1871. From 1872 to 1875, he served on board USS Pensacola in the South Pacific. After Pensacola, he served briefly on board USS New Hampshire and then spent two years serving on USS Hartford.

=== Railroad strike of 1877 ===
In July 1877, a violent railroad strike began in Martinsburg, West Virginia, sparking riots in other American cities such as Pittsburgh and Philadelphia, and President Rutherford B. Hayes authorized the use of the military in response. Tilley was temporarily transferred to USS Plymouth during the crisis, sailing up the Potomac River to Washington, D.C. Military leaders feared that rioters from Baltimore could travel to Washington to seize or damage vulnerable government targets. The troops defending Washington included the army, navy, and marines organized into a battalion of seven companies (Naval Brigade) under the command of Captain Edward Barrett; Tilley was placed in command of Company C. The precautions proved to be unnecessary, as the expected wave of rioters never materialized following the military's suppression of the strikers in Baltimore; the riots were also quashed in other cities within a short time.

Navy career
Midshipman – 1867
- 1867–1868: USS Franklin
- 1868–1869: USS Frolic

Ensign – 1868
- 1869–1872: USS Lancaster

Master – 1870

Lieutenant – 1871
- 1873–1875: USS Pensacola
- 1875: USS New Hampshire
- 1875–1877: USS Hartford
- 1877: USS Plymouth
- 1877–1878: USS Powhatan
- 1879–1881: United States Naval Academy
- 1881: USS Standish
- 1882: United States Naval Academy
- 1882–1885: USS Tennessee
- 1885–1889: United States Naval Academy

Lieutenant Commander – September 1887
- 1889–1890: Washington Navy Yard
- 1890–1893: USS San Francisco
- 1893–1897: United States Naval Academy
- 1896: USS Bancroft

Commander – September 1896
- 1897: Naval War College
- 1897–1898: USS Newport
- 1898: Naval Station Newport
- 1898–1899: USS Vicksburg
- 1899–1901: USS Abarenda; U.S. Naval Station Tutuila

Captain – October 1901
- 1902–1905: Mare Island Naval Shipyard
- 1905–1907: USS Iowa
- 1907: Philadelphia Naval Shipyard

Rear Admiral – February 24, 1907

After the strike, Tilley was transferred to the flagship USS Powhatan before requesting to take a six-month leave so that he could marry. On June 6, 1878, he married Emily Edelin Williamson, the daughter of a Navy surgeon, and left with her on an extended honeymoon in Europe. On his return to duty, Tilley served at the United States Naval Academy and remained there until 1882, either in a classroom or on a training ship. For the next three years, he served on board USS Tennessee. In 1885, he was promoted to lieutenant commander and returned to teach at the academy. During his tenure there, he was appointed head of the Department of Astronomy, Navigation, and Surveying, and then transferred to become head of the Department of Mechanical Drawing. In September 1889, he moved to the Washington Navy Yard to teach ordnance.

=== Chilean Civil War ===
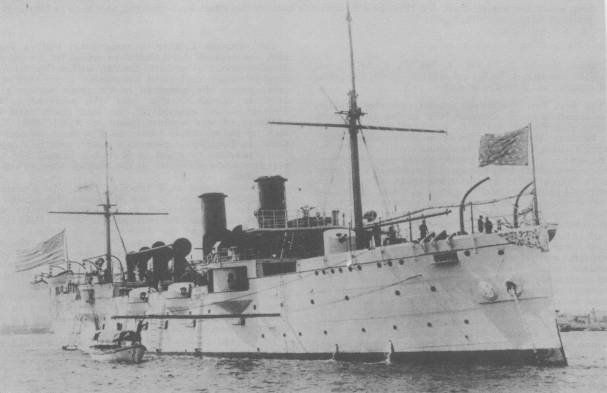
USS San Francisco in the 1890s

In 1890, Tilley was transferred to San Francisco to help test the newly built USS San Francisco and to become her executive officer. San Francisco transported troops to the port of Valparaíso during the 1891 Chilean Civil War, from which they could move on to protect the American consulate in the capital of Santiago. Insurgents captured the city, and Tilley remained to defend the consulate with a force of 100 men. After the war, he returned to the naval academy as head of the astronomy and navigation department. In 1896, he took command of USS Bancroft and sailed on an inspection tour of naval yards along the east coast of the United States. He was promoted to commander that October. In 1897, he was given command of USS Newport to sail to Nicaragua to evaluate the progress of the isthmus canal commission.

=== Spanish–American War ===
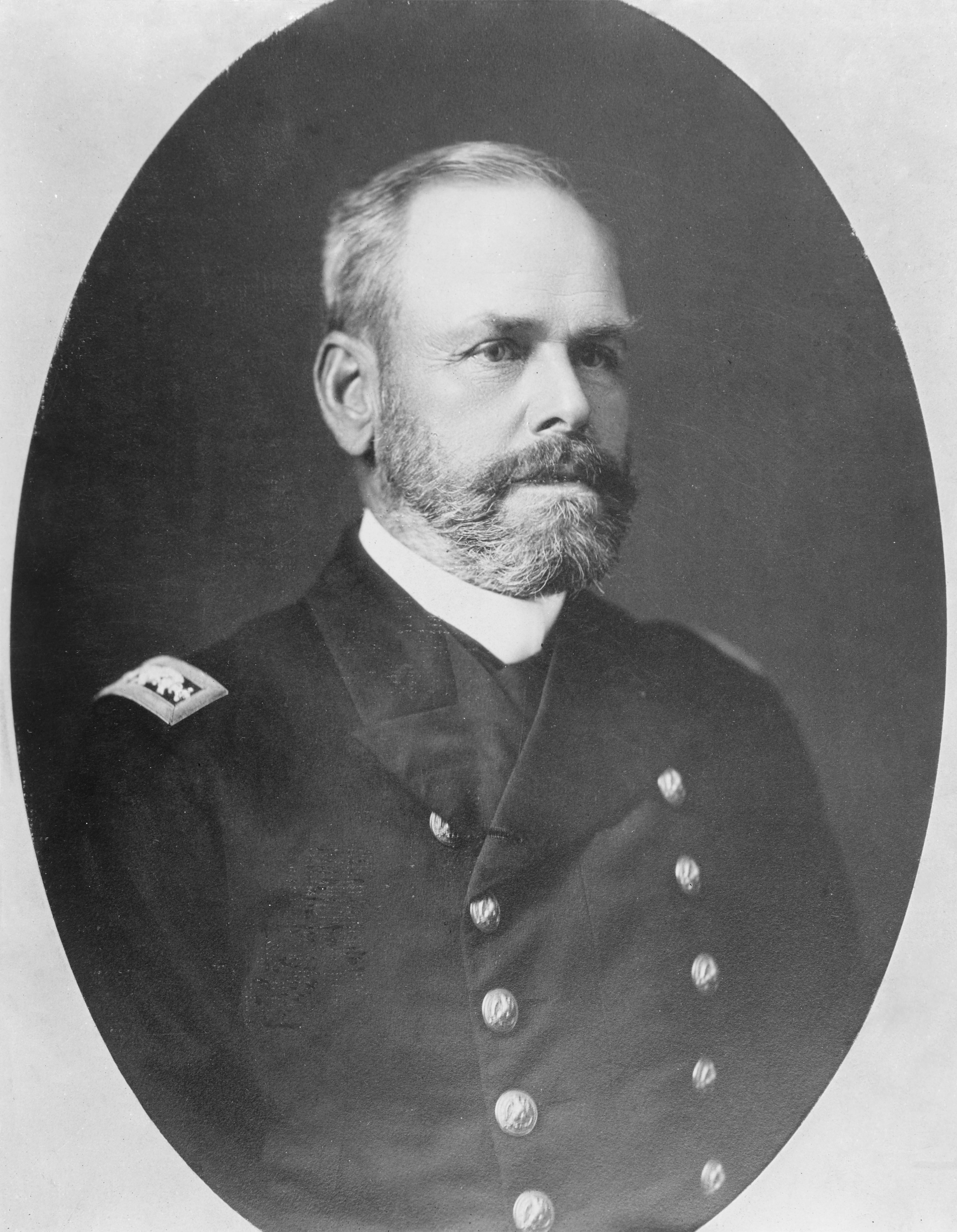
Tilley in the 1890s

On April 23, 1898, Spain declared war on the United States in response to American efforts to support Cuban independence. Tilley was in the Caribbean in command of Newport and in the heart of the conflict area. The United States responded with its own declaration of war against Spain on April 25, and Tilley captured the Spanish Navy's sloop Paquete and schooner Pireno two days later. He participated in the naval blockade of Santiago de Cuba but missed the subsequent Battle of Santiago de Cuba, as Newport was refueling at Guantánamo Bay when fighting broke out. Toward the end of the war, he was responsible for shelling the Cuban port of Manzanillo. He and Newport assisted in the capture of nine Spanish vessels, and he was transferred to the Newport Naval Yard at the conclusion of the war, then given the command of USS Vicksburg in October.

== Commandant of U.S. Naval Station Tutuila ==
The United States first expressed interest in building a naval station at Pago Pago, Samoa in 1872 at the behest of Henry A. Peirce, the United States Minister to Hawaii. A treaty to that effect was written and submitted, but it was not approved by the United States Senate. On February 13, 1878, a separate treaty was ratified by the Senate that granted the Samoan government diplomatic recognition and reaffirmed permission to build a naval station in the country. There were no further political obstacles, but funding for the station was not allocated and only a small coaling station was built on the island. Construction of the naval station did not begin until 1898, led by civilian contractors. In early 1899, Tilley was assigned the task of overseeing the station construction and becoming its first commandant. He was also put in command of the collier ship USS Abarenda to transport steel and coal to the construction site and to serve as the first station ship. After a long voyage, he took his new post on August 13, 1899.

Even before Tilley arrived in Samoa, the political situation there was shifting. The Second Samoan Civil War had recently ended, leaving the islands without a functioning central government. The United States, the United Kingdom, and Germany had competing strategic and economic interests in the region. Ratification of the Tripartite Convention on February 16, 1900, partitioned the Samoan archipelago. The eastern part, with Tutuila as its largest island, was placed under the control of the United States. The larger and historically dominant western part was assigned to Germany. Under this treaty, the British government relinquished its claims over Samoa in exchange for certain concessions from Germany in the Pacific and Africa.

After learning of the agreement, Tilley notified the local chiefs and asserted nominal United States control, but a formal decision had not yet been made on how the United States government would manage the territory. The construction of the naval base remained his primary responsibility, and he was dispatched to pick up additional supplies and coal at Auckland, New Zealand. President William McKinley placed the territory under the control of the United States Navy on February 19, 1900, and Assistant Secretary of the Navy Charles H. Allen named Tilley commandant of United States Naval Station Tutuila with a charter to "cultivate friendly relations with the natives".

== Acting governor of Tutuila ==
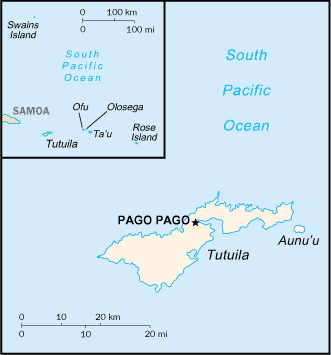
Map of American Samoa. Swains Island was not added to the territory until 1925.

Tilley's first task in his new role was to negotiate a deed of cession with the local powers to ensure a formal and peaceful transfer of control to the United States. With the partitioning of Samoa, two regional governments remained on Tutuila which had been subordinated to a government on the western, German-controlled island of Upolu. Both of these governments were favorable toward the cession. The inhabitants of the island of Taʻu and the volcanic doublet of Ofu-Olosega (together known as Manu'a) 70 miles (110 km) to the east were politically separate from Tutuila. On March 12, 1900, Tilley traveled to Taʻu to meet with the local king Tui Manuʻa Elisala. Ultimately, the king agreed to cede some sovereignty to the United States, but refused to consider full cession. The deed of cession was signed on April 17, 1900, and listed Manu'a as part of the United States' new territory, but without the signature of its representative. In it, Tilley was named Acting Governor; the territory did not have an official governor until the title was given to Governor Edmund Beardsley Underwood in 1905. Manu'a did not agree to sign the deed until 1904, after negotiating concessions from the United States.

Tilley's first acts were to impose a duty on imports to the territory, ban the sale of alcohol to the local population (but not Americans), and forbid the sale of Samoan lands to non-Samoans. On May 1, 1900, he proclaimed that the laws of the United States were in force in the territory, but that Samoan laws that did not conflict with U.S. law would remain in effect. He partitioned the territory into three districts, along the historical divisions implicitly acknowledged in the deed of cession: the two governments on Tutuila and the third comprising the islands of Manu'a, which still did not regard themselves as part of the territory. Over the next year, Tilley regulated firearms, enforced mandatory registrations of births, deaths, and marriages, levied taxes, and made the sabbath a public holiday. He created a small militia of native Samoans called the Fita Fita Guard for defense and police. The native volunteers in this force were trained at the naval station by a sergeant of the United States Marine Corps.

Problems arose during Tilley's administration because of conflicting Samoan and American laws. In one case, a native had caught and eaten a skipjack, a sacred fish which could only be eaten with the permission of a local chief under Samoan law. Traditional punishment decreed that the offender's house should be burned down and his crops uprooted, and he should be exiled from the territory. The native challenged his punishment under the American legal system, however, resulting in the arrest of the chief responsible for ordering the destruction of his property. The chief was sentenced to a year of house arrest in a criminal proceeding, on which Tilley sat as judge, and he was ordered to pay compensation for the destroyed property. There were similar issues with Samoan customs not blending well with the newly introduced American political divisions in the territory. For example, the territory's three district governors had equal authority but they were of differing Samoan social status. This disparity made decision-making more difficult and caused social tensions. Despite these problems, Tilley was well-considered by the locals. On December 18, 1900, the local chiefs sent a letter of congratulations on the re-election of President McKinley in which they said of Tilley, "you gave us a leader, a Governor, a High Chief, whom we have learned to love and respect".

Tilley took leave in June 1901 to return to Washington, leaving E. J. Dorn in command. Dorn subsequently had medical issues and was replaced by J. L. Jayne in October. That month, an anonymous complaint was made to Assistant Secretary of the Navy Frank W. Hackett against Commandant Tilley, alleging immorality and drunkenness. Almost simultaneously, he was promoted to captain by President Theodore Roosevelt. Tilley returned to Samoa on November 7, 1901, with his wife, and two days later was given a court martial. The trial lasted four days and only one witness was called for the prosecution. Ultimately, he was acquitted. Despite this, Captain Uriel Sebree was appointed as commandant on November 27, 1901. Tilley and his wife returned to the United States the following month.

Sebree later remarked of his predecessor that he had "great ability, kindness, tact and sound common sense". Unlike Sebree, who was concerned that he did not have a legal mandate to govern, Tilley was not shy about enacting legislation and being the de facto leader of the territory. Although the deed of cession recognized his authority and gave him the title of Acting Governor, as far as the United States government was concerned, he was officially responsible only for the naval station. As the first naval governor, Tilley laid the groundwork for much of the future governance of the territory, which did not yet even have a formal name. The American Samoa government includes Tilley and the other pre-1905 station commandants in its list of territorial governors.

== Later career and death ==
Tilley's next assignment came in March 1902 as a captain of the Mare Island Naval Shipyard in Vallejo, California. He remained in this post for three years before being assigned to USS Iowa on January 11, 1905. On February 23, 1907, he was made commandant of League Island Naval Yard in Philadelphia, Pennsylvania, and he was promoted to rear admiral the following day. He died of pneumonia less than a month later on March 18, 1907.

Tilley was one of 322 men and women who had died in 1907 listed by The Washington Post as "foremost in their various callings." He was survived by one son and two daughters. His son Benjamin Franklin Tilley Jr. also entered the Navy and retired with the rank of lieutenant commander.

== Notes ==
Military offices
| First | Naval Governor of American Samoa; February 17, 1900 – November 27, 1901 | Succeeded by Uriel Sebree |
