= Henry Minett =

- Midshipman Minett in 1877
- Born: May 30, 1857; Louisville, Kentucky, U.S.
- Died: December 20, 1952 (aged 95); Asheville, North Carolina, U.S.
- Military career
- Allegiance: United States of America
- Branch: United States Navy
- Service years: 1876–1906
- Rank: Captain
- Commands: USS Viking
- Conflicts: Battle of Midway

Henry Minett (May 30, 1857 – December 20, 1952) was a career officer of the United States Navy who served during the Spanish–American War. Prior to retirement in 1905, he achieved the rank of captain. He is best remembered as one of the early acting Governors of American Samoa. Minett Islet in Alaska is named for him.

== Early career ==
Henry Minett was born in Louisville, Kentucky and entered the United States Naval Academy shortly after his 16th birthday, on June 8, 1872. He graduated as a midshipman four years later, on June 20, 1876. In his early naval career, he was assigned first to USS Swatara, sailing as part of the North Atlantic Squadron. After being promoted to ensign, he was reassigned to USS Jamestown from 1879 to 1881. The Jamestown served as the guard ship for the port of Sitka, Alaska. Although he was only an ensign, a small islet in Sitka harbor, Minett Islet, was named for him. On his return from Alaska, Minett was assigned to the training ship USS New Hampshire in 1882. In the next several years, Minett also served on board USS Hartford and USS Lackawanna, before being assigned to the research-oriented Naval Torpedo Station at Newport, Rhode Island and sailed with USS Marblehead for several years around Europe before returning to the United States in 1897. He served on board USS Wabash, a receiving ship in Boston Harbor until 1898.

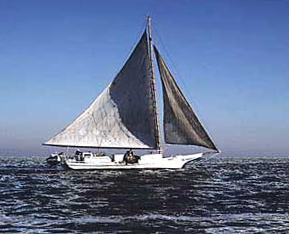

Midshipman - June 20, 1877
- 1877–1878: USS Swatara

Ensign - November 1, 1879
- 1879–1871: USS Jamestown
- 1882: USS New Hampshire
- 1882–1883: USS Hartford
- 1883–1884: USS Lackawanna
- 1885–1886: Naval Torpedo Station

Lieutenant, JG - May 23, 1886
- 1886–1887: USS Minnesota
- 1888: USS Pensacola
- 1888–1891: USS Omaha
- 1891: USS Vermont

Lieutenant - December 11, 1891
- 1894–1897: USS Marblehead
- 1897–1898: USS Wabash
- 1898: USS Viking
- 1898: League Island Naval Yard
- 1898: USS Yorktown
- 1899–1900: USS Adams

Lt. Commander - September 25, 1899
- 1901–1902: USS Concord
- 1902–1903: USS Wheeling
- 1903–1905: USS Wabash
- 1905: Naval War College

Commander - June 28, 1905

Captain - July 6, 1905
- 1906–1908?: Norfolk Naval Yard

On May 23, 1886, Minett was promoted to Lieutenant, junior grade. Shortly after, he was transferred to the receiving ship USS Minnesota where he served until 1888. After that, he was briefly assigned to USS Pensacola before a longer stint on board USS Omaha, sailing to Japan. While in Japan, Omaha assisted in putting out a large fire at Hodogaya-ku, Yokohama. On his return to the United States, Minett served on board USS Vermont in New York Harbor. He was promoted to lieutenant on December 11, 1891.

== Spanish–American War to the Thousand Days War ==
Shortly after the start of the Spanish–American War, Minett was given command of the newly commissioned USS Viking. Viking began her life as a private yacht, but was armed and pressed into service for the war. In his first months in command, Minett and Viking patrolled the waters near Sandy Hook, New Jersey to prevent Spanish attacks on New York. On July 12, 1898, Minett and Viking were transferred to Cuba to assist in the naval blockade. Minett's duties in Cuba included transporting passengers, orders, and supplies between the blockading ships. On August 16, 1898, four days after the conclusion of hostilities, Minett was ordered to take Viking to Norfolk, Virginia where she was decommissioned. Minett saw no combat during the war.

Following the war, Minett was reassigned first to Yorktown, then to Adams where he was promoted to lieutenant commander, and subsequently made the executive officer of Concord. On board Concord, Minett was given a test of his command abilities. While sailing en route to a settlement at Unalaska, Alaska, in the Aleutian Islands, Minett's commanding officer became seriously ill. Minett assumed command of the vessel and sailed her against orders to Seattle, Washington to get his commander treatment. Minett's arrival in Seattle on July 17, 1901, was reported in newspapers across the country and the Navy Department immediately launched an investigation into the violation of orders. After only five days, Minett's command judgement was upheld and he was cleared of charges.

Near the end of Colombia's Thousand Days War, in November 1901, Concord and Iowa were sent south to protect American interests. Colombian liberals had seized the town of Colón, Panama and the Panama Railroad and appeared ready to take Panama City. Concord arrived on November 23 and Lieutenant-Commander Minett was placed in command of a battalion of 412 men from the two ships. To reclaim the railroad, Minett launched trains under guard from Panama City, each sporting two American flags. If the Colombian liberals fired on the trains, the Navy would consider this serious enough provocation to reply in force. In this way, the railroad was restored with no major conflicts. During Concord's time in Panama, the train was also used to bring wounded Colombian soldiers back to Panama City where they could be treated by Navy doctors. Colón was surrendered to the US Navy on November 30 and the Navy pulled out its ships shortly after.

== American Samoa ==
On January 16, 1903, Minett was acting-governor when the formal reply to the deed of secession arrived from President Theodore Roosevelt. A full military ceremony was held where Minett presented each of the tribal chiefs who had signed the deed with an engraved silver watch and chain. Minett also presented a letter from the president acknowledging his acceptance of the territory. Using Navy officers as a color guard, Minett also formally presented the gift of an American flag to the members of the Fita Fita Guard, the local militia created by Governor Tilley three years earlier.

While Minett was acting as governor, the territory was visited by German Samoa Governor Wilhelm Heinrich Solf, perhaps the first such visit from a governor's eastern counterpart. In this meeting, the two governors discussed maintaining friendly relations, but also restricting travel between the two territories. Some natives had been ignoring the partition and going on extended "visiting parties" between the zones. Both governors agreed to attempt to curb this practice.

Minett's time as governor was also marked by the improving of roads in the territory and by hunger problems.

== Retirement ==
After retirement, Minett remained at Norfolk Naval Yard on the court-martial board of inquiry. By 1908, he was president of that board.

In 1880, an islet was named in his honor: Minett Islet. Minett was serving at Sitka Sound aboard USS Jamestown when the islet was named.

Military offices
Preceded by Uriel Sebree	Naval Governor of American Samoa (Acting); December 16, 1902 - May 5, 1903	Succeeded by Edmund Beardsley Underwood
