= USC&GS Silliman =

History

United States
- Name: USC&GS Silliman
- Builder: Fardy and Woodall at Baltimore, Maryland
- Launched: 1871
- Out of service: 1888

General characteristics
- Class & type: Schooner
- Length: 83 ft (25 m)
- Beam: 21 ft (6.4 m)
- Draught: 6 ft (1.8 m)

USC&GS Silliman was a ship of the United States Coast Survey and later the United States Coast and Geodetic Survey named for Benjamin Silliman. She was a schooner built by Fardy and Woodall at Baltimore, Maryland, in 1871. She spent the period between 1871 and 1887 on the Atlantic coast. She was briefly commanded in 1879 by future rear admiral Uriel Sebree.

After being found in poor condition not warranting repair and excess to the Survey's needs , she was offered to the US Navy in 1888 for experimental use. The offer was accepted and she was used in an "experimental trial of the dynamite gun."
