= USS Newport (PG-12) =

American gunboat

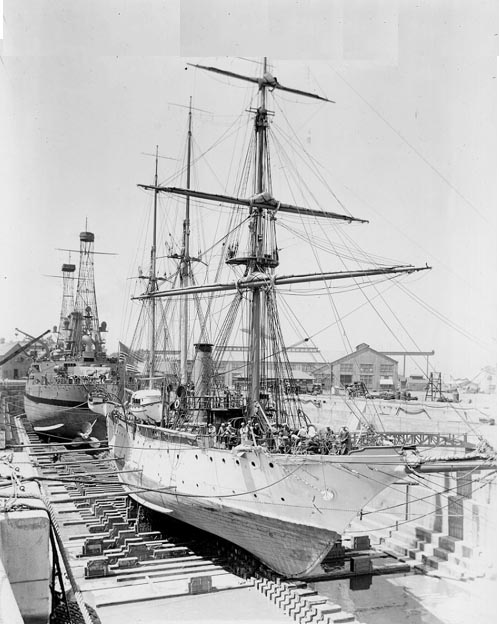
- USS Newport and USS Ohio in Dry Dock No. 2 at the Mare Island Navy Yard, 10 August 1915

History

United States
- Name: USS Newport
- Namesake: Newport and Newport County, Rhode Island
- Builder: Bath Iron Works, Bath, Maine
- Laid down: March 1896
- Launched: 5 December 1896
- Commissioned: 5 October 1897
- Decommissioned: 7 September 1898
- Recommissioned: 1 May 1900
- Decommissioned: 1 December 1902
- Recommissioned: 15 May 1903
- Decommissioned: 17 November 1906
- Reclassified: PG-12, 17 July 1920; IX-19, 1 July 1921
- Stricken: 12 October 1931
- Fate: Served a training ship

General characteristics
- Type: Annapolis-class gunboat
- Displacement: 1,153 long tons (1,172 t)
- Length: 204 ft 5 in (62.31 m)
- Beam: 36 ft (11 m)
- Draft: 12 ft 9 in (3.89 m)
- Installed power: 800 ihp (597 kW)
- Propulsion: 1 × vertical triple expansion reciprocating engine; 2 × Babcock boilers; 1 × screw
- Speed: 12.8 kn (23.7 km/h; 14.7 mph)
- Complement: 156 officers and enlisted
- Armament: 1 × 4 in (100 mm) gun; 2 × 3 in (76 mm) guns; 2 × 6-pounder guns

USS Newport (Gunboat No.12/PG-12/IX-19) was a United States Navy gunboat. She was laid down by Bath Iron Works, Bath, Maine in March 1896, launched on 5 December 1896, sponsored by Miss Frances La Farge, and commissioned on 5 October 1897, Comdr. B. F. Tilley in command.

== Service history ==
=== US Navy, 1897–1906 ===
After fitting out in Boston, Newport sailed for duty in the Caribbean on 15 October 1897. Between December 1897 and August 1898, the ship patrolled off the West Indies and Central America, During the Spanish–American War, she received credit for assisting in the capture of nine Spanish vessels. The ship returned to the United States and decommissioned on 7 September 1898.

Recommissioned on 1 May 1900, Newport served as training ship at the United States Naval Academy and at the Naval Training Station at Newport, Rhode Island, until decommissioning at Boston on 1 December 1902. Recommissioned on 15 May 1903, she operated with the Atlantic Fleet along the eastern seaboard and in the West Indies until decommissioned on 17 November 1906.

=== Training ship, 1907–1934 ===
Newport was loaned to the Massachusetts Naval Militia on 2 June 1907, and on 27 October 1907 was reassigned to the New York Nautical School. She also served as training ship for the 3rd Naval District until June 1918, when she was returned to the Navy for wartime service. On 26 July 1918 she was reassigned to continue duty as a New York State training ship under control of the Commandant, 3rd Naval District. The gunboat sailed on a training cruise from New York to the Gulf of Mexico and the West Indies from 9 December 1918 to 25 May 1919. On 3 June 1919, she returned to full control of New York State. In 1924 explorer Herbert Lawrence Bridgman died on board Newport.

Newport's designation was changed from Gunboat No.12 to PG-12 on 17 July 1920, and she was reclassified as the Unclassified Miscellaneous Auxiliary IX-19 on 1 July 1921.

Struck from the Navy List on 12 October 1931, she was turned over to the city of Aberdeen, Washington, by an act of Congress on 14 May 1934, to be used as a training ship for the United States Naval Reserve.
