= Shook, Hardy & Bacon =

US law firm based in Kansas City, Missouri

Shook, Hardy & Bacon, L.L.P.
- Headquarters: Crown Center; Kansas City, Missouri, U.S.
- No. of offices: 17
- No. of attorneys: 500+
- No. of employees: 1,400
- Major practice areas: Product liability, tort, business litigation, intellectual property, environmental and toxic tort, labor, and employment
- Key people: Madeleine M. McDonough, Chair
- Revenue: $353.52 M (2019)
- Date founded: 1889; 137 years ago
- Founder: Frank P. Sebree
- Company type: Limited liability partnership
- Website: shb.com

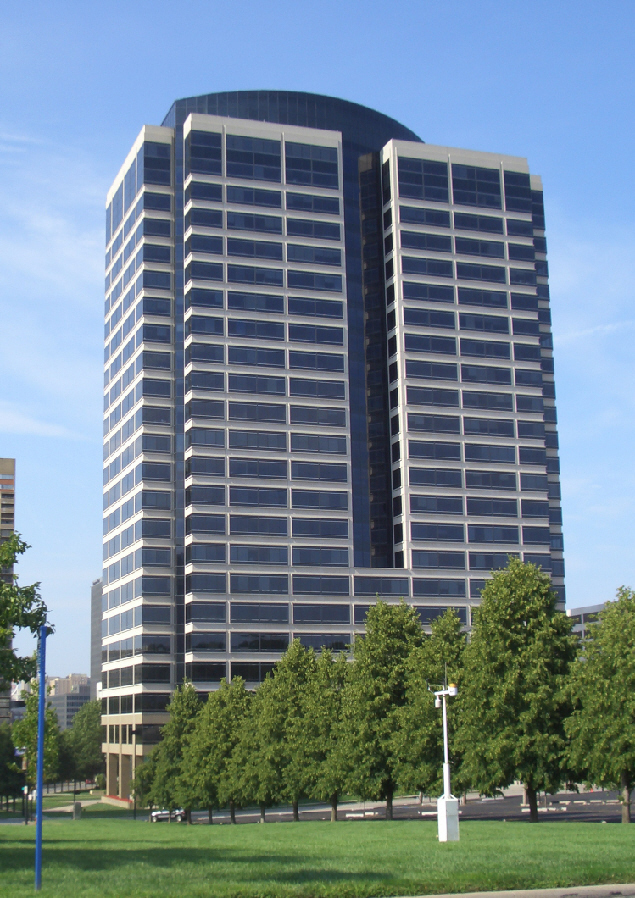
SHB occupies all 24 floors of its corporate headquarters in the 2555 Grand Building in the Crown Center complex.

Shook, Hardy & Bacon (SHB), L.L.P. (previously Shook, Hardy, Ottman, Mitchell and Bacon) is a U.S. law firm based in Kansas City, Missouri. In 2012, The National Law Journal ranked the firm as the 87th largest in the United States. The firm has offices in Miami, New York, Los Angeles, Atlanta, and Boston.

The firm is notable for its representation of five of the six major U.S. tobacco companies, and for its involvement in hiding the health risks of tobacco. The firm inspired the fictional firm of Smoot, Hawking in the satirical novel Thank You for Smoking. In 2023, it was announced that Bill Corrigan, a former judge, a one-time president of the Missouri Bar, and former deputy attorney general of Missouri was joining the firm as the managing partner of the firm's St. Louis office.

== Notable clients ==
SHB also has represented pharmaceutical companies, including Eli Lilly and Company, Amgen, Bristol-Myers Squibb, GlaxoSmithKline, Sanofi-Aventis, Guidant, and Wyeth. In 2007, Shook won a $69.5 million verdict on behalf of client Sprint Nextel, against Vonage. William H. Colby, an attorney at the firm, represented Nancy Cruzan (by way of her parents) in the right-to-die case, Cruzan v. Director, Missouri Department of Health, as part of Shook's pro bono work.

=== Tobacco companies ===
The firm has represented five of the six major U.S. tobacco companies: American Brands, Brown & Williamson, RJR Nabisco, Philip Morris Inc. (now Altria Group) and Loews Inc.; a 1992 New York Times article about the firm is titled "'Tobacco' Its Middle Name, Law Firm Thrives, for Now".

In 1992, a federal judge all but accused the firm of orchestrating fraud on behalf of the tobacco industry and exerting attorney–client privilege to hide facts about tobacco's health hazards during the 1960s and 1970s.

According to Brown & Williamson whistleblower Jeffrey Wigand, SHB coached staff at the tobacco company on language that downplayed the health risks of tobacco.

In 2019, the firm launched its cannabis practice to address regulatory, employment, and litigation matters.
