= USS Viking (1898) =

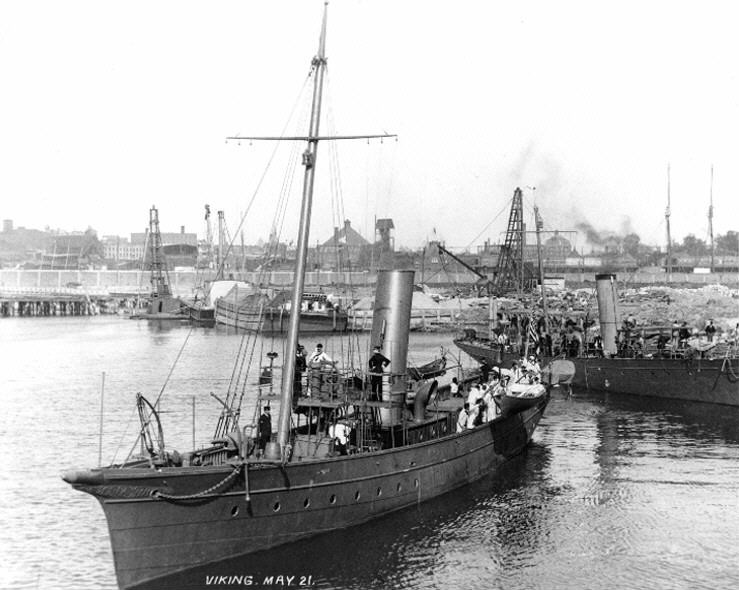
- USS Viking (1898) at New York Navy Yard, 21 May 1898.

History

United States
- Name: USS Viking
- Namesake: Viking sailors
- Builder: Delaware River Iron Ship Building and Engine Works
- Launched: 1883
- Acquired: 22 April 1898
- Commissioned: 11 May 1898
- Decommissioned: 22 September 1898
- Recommissioned: 29 September 1899
- Decommissioned: 23 October 1899
- Fate: Transferred to U.S. Department of War 8 December 1899

General characteristics
- Displacement: 218 tons
- Length: 122 ft 0 in (37.19 m)
- Beam: 21 ft 0 in (6.40 m)
- Draft: 8 ft 6 in (2.59 m)
- Speed: 11.75 knots (21.76 km/h; 13.52 mph)
- Complement: 43
- Armament: 1 3 pounder gun

The first USS Viking was an iron-hulled, steam yacht built in 1883 at Chester, Pennsylvania, by Delaware River Iron Ship Building and Engine Works and was acquired by the United States Navy on 22 April 1898 from Mr. Horace A. Hutchins for service in the Spanish–American War. Converted for naval service at New York, she was placed in commission there on 11 May 1898, Lt. Henry Minett in command.

Assigned to the North Atlantic Fleet as a dispatch ship, Viking remained at New York for the next two months. On 12 July, she departed New York bound for the blockading forces off the Cuban coast. After brief stops at Port Royal, South Carolina, and Key West, Florida, she joined the Fleet in Cuban waters on 28 July. After three weeks of duty carrying orders, messages, and passengers between ships on station on the blockade, Viking ended her brief war service without having participated in any combat. She headed back to Key West on 16 August, remained overnight, and then continued her voyage—via Port Royal—to Hampton Roads, Virginia. She remained in the Hampton Roads-Norfolk area until 8 September when she headed up Chesapeake Bay to Annapolis, Maryland. After a two-day visit, she returned to Norfolk on the 11th. She was placed out of commission there on 22 September 1898.

Viking remained at Norfolk until 29 September 1899 at which time she was reactivated for a bit more than three weeks of service which ended on 23 October. On 9 December 1899, Viking was transferred to the United States Department of War for use by the United States Army. No records telling of her Army service or of her ultimate disposition have been found.
