= USS Standish =

Tugboat of the United States Navy

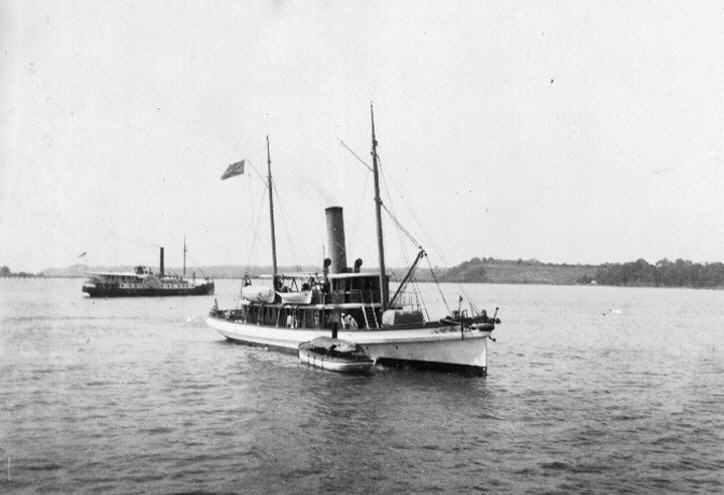

History

United States
- Name: USS Standish
- Namesake: Myles Standish
- Laid down: 1864
- Launched: 1865
- In service: 1871
- Fate: Sold, 5 August 1921

General characteristics
- Type: Tugboat
- Tonnage: 350 long tons (356 t)
- Length: 137 ft (42 m)
- Beam: 26 ft (7.9 m)
- Draft: 9 ft 6 in (2.90 m)
- Speed: 10 knots (19 km/h; 12 mph)
- Armament: 2 × guns

USS Standish was an iron-hulled screw tug of the United States Navy.

Built at Boston in 1864, but completed too late for service in the American Civil War. After completing her trials in January 1866, the ship was laid up at Norfolk.

== Service history ==
In 1871 she was placed in service at the Norfolk Navy Yard. After repairs at Philadelphia in late 1878 and 1879, the tug served briefly at Newport, Rhode Island, before moving to Annapolis for service as a practice ship at the United States Naval Academy. Except for occasional visits to navy yards for repairs, she remained at the Naval Academy serving as a station tug when not on duty as a practice ship - through World War I. She was sold on 5 August 1921 to B. Wever & Sons, Baltimore, Maryland.
