= Sebree Peak =

Mountain in Alaska, United States

Sebree Peak is a mountain in the eastern part of Mitkof Island, one of the islands in the Alexander Archipelago in Alaska. It is named for United States Navy officer and Governor of American Samoa Uriel Sebree. Sebree Island is named for the same officer.
