= Minett Islet =

Coordinates: 57°02′31″N 135°17′31″W

Minett Islet is a small islet in Jamestown Bay, Sitka Sound in Alaska. It is named for United States Navy officer and Governor of American Samoa Henry Minett.
