= Frank P. Sebree =

American lawyer and politician (1854–1940)

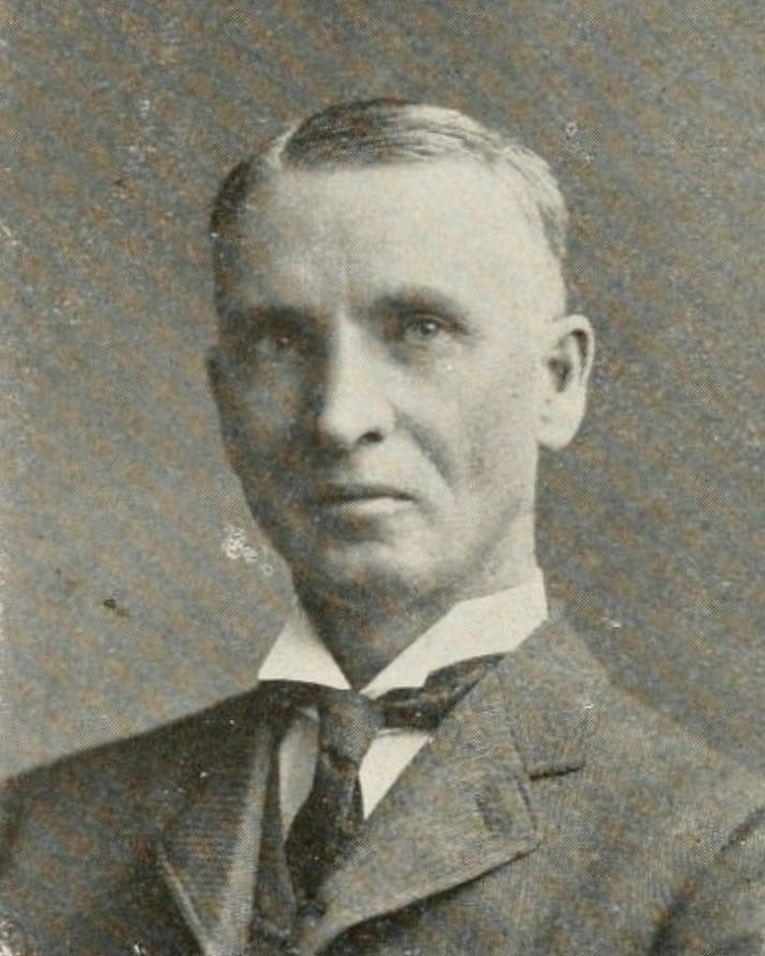
- Sebree (c. 1902)

Member of the Missouri House of Representatives
- In office 1887–1891

Personal details
- Born: Frank Payne Sebree; October 25, 1854 Fayette, Missouri, U.S.
- Died: September 29, 1940 (aged 85) Kansas City, Missouri, U.S.
- Resting place: Forest Hill Calvary Cemetery; Kansas City, Missouri, U.S.
- Party: Democratic
- Spouse: Russie Boyd (m. 1883)
- Relations: Uriel Sebree (brother)
- Children: 1
- Education: Missouri State University

Frank Payne Sebree (October 25, 1854 – September 29, 1940) was an American lawyer and politician from Missouri. He served in the Missouri House of Representatives. He was the founder of Kansas City law firm Shook, Hardy & Bacon.

== Early life ==
Frank Payne Sebree was born on October 25, 1854, in Fayette, Missouri. His older brother was Uriel Sebree. He attended Central College in Fayette and then Pritchett College in Glasgow, Missouri. He then graduated with a law degree from Missouri State University and was admitted to the bar.

== Career ==
After graduating, Sebree joined the law office of Lay & Balch in Jefferson City, Missouri. In 1877, he practiced law in Glasgow. In 1880, Sebree moved to Marshall, Missouri, and practiced law until 1889 with Colonel Samuel Boyd. Sebree was a Democrat. In 1886, Sebree was elected to the Missouri House of Representatives, representing Saline County. He served two terms, from 1887 to 1891. He served as chairman of the judiciary committee in 1889.

Sebree moved to Kansas City in 1889 and formed a law partnership with W. A. Alderson. He established the law firm McDougal & Sebree with Judge H. C. McDougal in 1891. He would later be part of a law firm called Sebree, Sebree & Shook and it would later get renamed as Shook, Hardy & Bacon. In 1894, Sebree was appointed city attorney of Westport, Missouri. In 1898, Sebree was the Democratic nominee for mayor of Kansas City.

Sebree served as chairman of the County Democratic Committee from 1896 to 1898. In 1899, Sebree worked as county counselor until resigning in 1902. In 1902, he was appointed police commissioner by Governor Alexander Monroe Dockery. He resigned the role in August 1902 to serve as chairman of the Election Board. In 1907, Sebree became legal advisor of the police board and served several years on the police board.

In 1918, Sebree became president of the park board and held the position when Sebree Bridge, a concrete span across Brush Creek on Benton Boulevard was dedicated in his honor.

== Personal life ==
Sebree married Russie (or Gussie) H. Boyd of Marshall in 1883. Her father was Colonel Sam Boyd. They had one son, Sam B.

In 1898, Sebree lived at 23rd Street and Flora Avenue with his family.

Sebree died following a heart attack some days before on September 29, 1940, at his home on 5119 Main Street in Kansas City. He was buried at Forest Hill Calvary Cemetery in Kansas City.
