= Sebree Island =

Alaskan island named in honor of Uriel Sebree

- Sebree Island location in Glacier Bay
- Location within Alaska

Geography
- Location: Glacier Bay
- Coordinates: 58°45′46″N 136°09′26″W

Administration
- United States
- State: Alaska
- Borough: The Unorganized Borough

Additional information
- Time zone: AKST (UTC-9)
  - Summer (DST): AKDT (UTC-8)
- ZIP code: 99901 ... 99950
- Area code: +1 907

Sebree Island is an island in Muir Inlet, Glacier Bay in Alaska. It is named for United States Navy officer and Governor of American Samoa Rear Admiral Uriel Sebree. Island also known as Headland Island as it was called by Cushing in 1891 (p. 228). Sebree Peak is named for the same officer.
