= Minotti =

18th century Governor of Corinth

Minotti was a Governor of Corinth, then under the power of the Doge. In 1715 the city was stormed by the Turks, and during the siege one of the magazines in the Turkish camp blew up, killing 600 men. Byron says it was Minotti himself who fired the train, and leads us to infer that he was one of those who perished in the explosion.

The grand army of the Turks (1715), under the Prime Visir, tried to open to themselves a way into the heart of the Morea, and to form the siege of Napoli di Romania, the most considerable place in all the country, thought it best in the first place to attack Corinth, upon which they made several storms. The garrison being weakened, and the governor seeing it was impossible to hold out against so mighty a force, thought it fit to beat a parley; but while they were treating about the articles, one of the magazines in the Turkish camp, wherein they had six hundred barrels of powder, blew up by accident, whereby six or seven hundred men were killed; which so enraged the infidels, that they would not grant any capitulation, but stormed the place with so much fury, that they took it, and put most of the garrison with Signior Minotti, the governor, to the sword. The rest, with Antonio Bembo, Provveditore Straordinario were made prisoners of war."
