= USS Abarenda (AC-13) =

Collier of the United States Navy

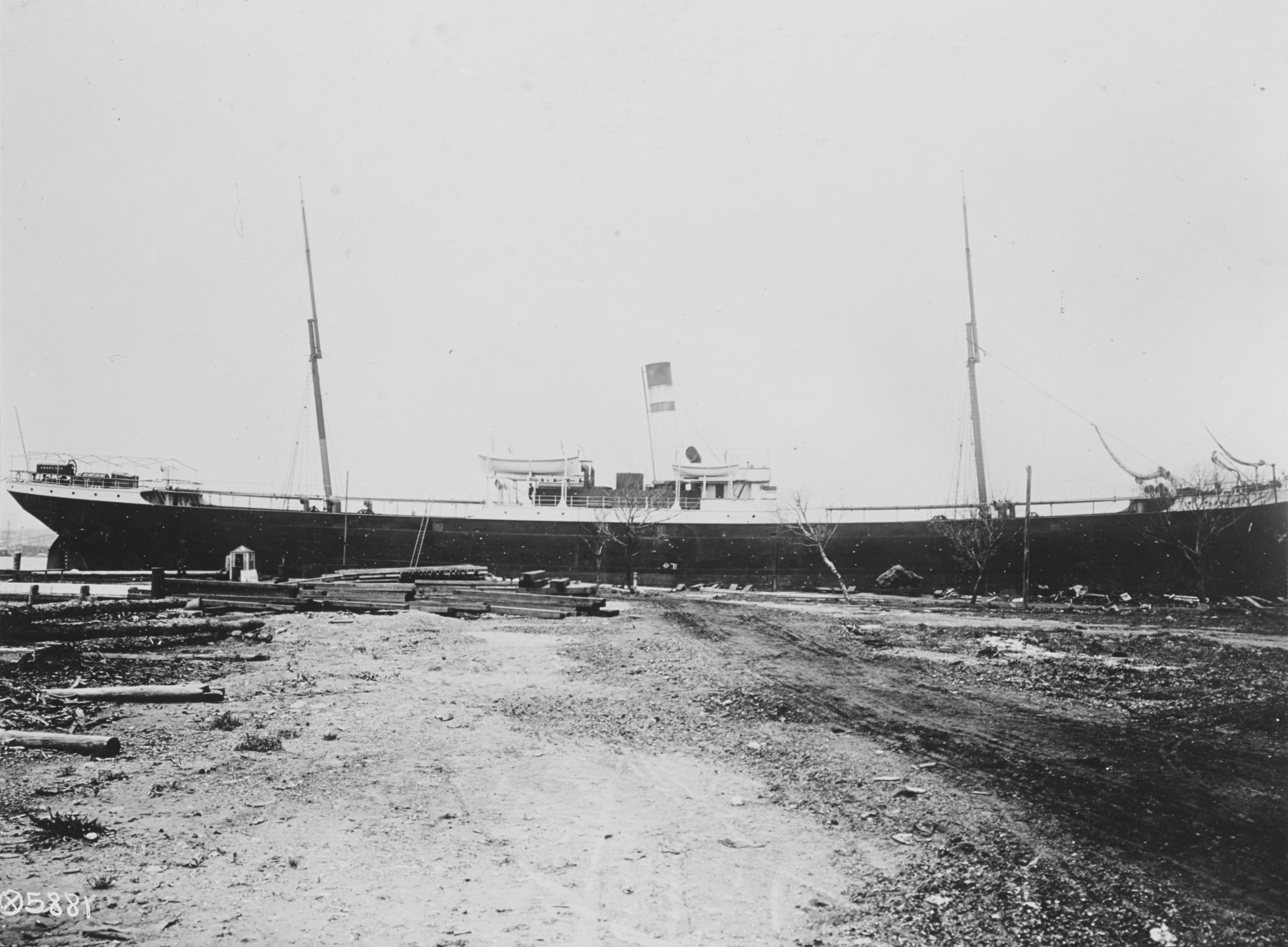
- USS Abarenda

History

United States
- Name: USS Abarenda
- Builder: Edwards Shipbuilding Company, Newcastle, England
- Launched: 11 August 1892
- Acquired: 5 May 1898
- Commissioned: 20 May 1898
- Decommissioned: 21 January 1926
- Reclassified: AC-13, 17 July 1920; AG-14, 1 July 1924
- Fate: Sold into civilian service, 28 February 1926

General characteristics
- Type: Collier
- Displacement: 6,680 long tons (6,790 t)
- Length: 325 ft 6 in (99.21 m)
- Beam: 42 ft (13 m)
- Draft: 22 ft 10 in (6.96 m)
- Speed: 9 kn (10 mph; 17 km/h)
- Complement: 69
- Armament: 4 × 3-pounders

The first USS Abarenda (AC-13/AG-14) was a collier in the service of the United States Navy during World War I.

She was originally a merchant ship built in 1892 at Newcastle, England by the Edwards Shipbuilding Company and was acquired by the Navy on 5 May 1898. She was fitted out as Collier No. 13 and commissioned at the New York Navy Yard on 20 May 1898.

== Service history ==
=== Spanish–American War, 1898 ===
Abarenda departed New York on 28 May 1898 and stopped at Lamberts Point, Virginia, to load coal and ammunition before sailing for Cuba on the 30th. On 8–9 June, and then from 10 to 26 June, Abarenda replenished the bunkers and magazines of American warships at Santiago and Guantánamo Bay, and also provided gunfire support as the occasion demanded (her port bow gun shelled Spanish positions at the mouth of the Guantanamo River on 12 June). That same day, Lt. Cdr. Buford presented the marine garrison ashore at Camp McCalla with a flag pole and, after being given an ensign by Captain Bowman McCalla, of the cruiser Marblehead, a party of two officers and four men – under Lieutenant Stephen Jenkins – from Abarenda, erected the pole and raised the colors over the marine camp. "When the flag was hoisted by our men," writes Buford, "the Squadron lying off the camp cheered it... the marines... were given new life and some took up the cheering...." Abarenda returned to Lamberts Point on 2 July and remained in the Hampton Roads area through the end of the war with Spain in August.

=== South America, 1898–1899 ===
On 18 September, she sailed for South American waters, and reached Bahia, Brazil on 19 October. En route home, the ship visited Barbados, and St. Thomas, Danish West Indies, before ultimately reaching Hampton Roads on 8 December. Coaling duties with the North Atlantic Squadron occupied the ship through the early months of 1899.

=== Station ship, 1899–1902 ===
On 21 April 1899, after completing the loading of a cargo of construction materials (steel, corrugated iron, and glass) which belonged to a San Francisco contractor given the contract to build a wharf and a coal shed at Pago Pago, Tutuila, American Samoa, and steel rods and angle irons earmarked for strengthening the foundations of the coal shed at Pago Pago, Abarenda shifted to Coal Pier No. 2 at Hampton Roads the following day, and coaled until the 24th. She departed Hampton Roads on 30 April, bound for the Pacific. En route, the ship stopped briefly at Montevideo, Uruguay, and Punta Arenas, Chile; rounded Cape Horn in rough weather (rolling as much as 30° during the passage); and visited Valparaíso, Chile; Bounty Bay, Pitcairn Island; and Tahiti, before sighting Tutuila on 9 August. She anchored in Apia Harbor the following morning, and then shifted to Pago Pago on the morning of the 13th, to soon commence unloading the cargo brought from Norfolk.

Assigned duty as station ship at Samoa, Abarenda spent the next two and a half years largely ferrying people and cargo between Apia and Pago Pago, often carrying as many as 50 – or more – Samoan natives each trip. Twice during this period, during the winter of 1899–1900 and the winter of 1900–1901, the ship made a voyage from Samoan waters to New Zealand, where she was drydocked in the Calliope Dock at Auckland for hull work. Relieved of duty as station ship by the gunboat Wheeling on 24 May 1902, Abarenda sailed for the United States that same day, and, after touching at Lundy Point, Chile; Montevideo; St. Thomas and San Juan, Puerto Rico, en route, reached the Virginia Capes on 9 August. Shifting to the Norfolk Naval Shipyard at mid-day on the 10th, she underwent preparations for inactivation, and was decommissioned on 4 September.

=== Atlantic Fleet, 1903–1909 ===
Following her recommissioning on 3 November 1903, Abarenda sailed to Guantánamo Bay and Pensacola, Florida, to support the Atlantic Fleet.

She was next ordered to carry coal and ammunition to the European Squadron and departed Norfolk on 23 April 1904. She filled the bunkers of the battleships Maine, Alabama, Kearsarge, and Iowa from 3–20 June, and arrived at Piraeus, Greece on 30 June. After a two-day stop at Gibraltar in mid-July, the collier headed home on 3 August and arrived back at Norfolk where she immediately began loading coal and ammunition to supply the European Squadron. The collier again sailed for the Mediterranean on 14 October, arrived at Gibraltar on 2 November, and soon moved on to Genoa, Italy, to coal more ships. After a brief stop at Gibraltar, she got underway for the United States on 28 November.

Abarenda reached Norfolk on 14 January 1905. Late in the month, the ship made another coaling trip to Puerto Rico before again going out of commission at Norfolk on 21 February. At that time, the ship's Navy crew was removed; that afternoon, the vessel was placed in service with a merchant crew. For the next three and one-half years, she provided collier service for the Navy along the Atlantic coast until inactivated at Norfolk on 6 October 1909. On 26 November 1907 she collided with steamer Gloucester in Chesapeake Bay at the lower end of Cut-Off Channel, minor damage to both vessels.

=== Asiatic Fleet, 1910–1917 ===
Placed back in service as a U.S. Naval Auxiliary on 19 May 1910 Abarenda began preparing for service in the Far East. Departing Staten Island on 14 July 1910, she proceeded via the Suez Canal to the Philippine Islands, arriving at Cavite on 20 September to begin serving the warships of the Asiatic Fleet.

=== World War I, 1917–1918 ===
After the United States entered World War I, Abarenda was placed back in commission on 27 May 1917 when her officers and crew were sworn into the Naval Auxiliary Reserve — in response to an order issued by the Navy Department on 7 May directing that naval auxiliaries, which had previously been crewed by civilian officers and sailors, be brought fully into the Navy and crewed by Navy personnel.

=== Asiatic Fleet, 1919–1926 ===
With the exception of a short time in 1919 when she served as a station ship at Samoa, the collier – designated AC-13 on 17 July 1920 – remained on duty with the Asiatic Fleet for the remainder of her career. It was in the twilight of her naval career that the ship took part in humanitarian relief in the wake of the devastating earthquake that occurred in Japan on 1 September 1923.

The first word received in the Asiatic Fleet was at 11:00 on 2 September, through a telegram to a Japanese newspaper in Dairen, Manchuria, where a detachment of the Fleet had been sent for liberty purposes. Admiral Edwin Anderson, Jr., the Commander in Chief, Asiatic Fleet, immediately set the wheels in motion to offer relief to the stricken land. As part of the movement to gather supplies, Abarenda received orders on 5 September to load non-perishable stores and medical supplies at Hankou, China, and proceed immediately to Japanese waters. Ultimately reaching Yokohama on 18 September, the ship remained there for several days unloading, retained there temporarily to assist the American Embassy and the Red Cross in the distribution of relief supplies.

A short time later, on 18 January 1924, Abarenda's duties were changed when she became the receiving ship at Cavite and was assigned to the 16th Naval District; still later that year, she was reclassified as a miscellaneous auxiliary, and was redesignated AG-14 on 1 July 1924. Reassigned to the Asiatic Fleet, proper, in November 1924, the ship spent the remainder of her career engaged in carrying supplies, mail, and men from Cavite to the ships operating along the coasts of China and Japan.

=== Decommissioning and sale ===
Decommissioned on 21 January 1926, Abarenda was simultaneously struck from the Naval Vessel Register. She was sold to S. R. Paterno on 28 February 1926. The ship was scrapped in 1934.
