= Battle of Carthage order of battle =

The order of battle for the Battle of Carthage in Missouri in 1861 during the American Civil War includes:

- Battle of Carthage order of battle: Confederate
- Battle of Carthage order of battle: Union

== See also ==
- Battle of Carthage (disambiguation)
