= Battle of Carthage order of battle: Confederate =

The following Missouri units and commanders fought in the Battle of Carthage of the American Civil War. The Union order of battle is listed separately.

== Abbreviations used ==
=== Military rank ===
- MG = Major General
- BG = Brigadier General
- Col = Colonel
- Ltc = Lieutenant Colonel
- Maj = Major
- Cpt = Captain

== Missouri State Guard ==
MG Sterling Price [not present]
Governor Claiborne F. Jackson
Col Lewis Henry Little, Adjutant General

Division	Regiments and Other
Third Division BG John Bullock Clark, Sr.	1st Missouri: Col John Q. Burbridge; 1st Missouri: Ltc Edwin W. Price; 1st Missouri Regiment: Maj John Bullock Clark, Jr.
Fourth Division BG William Y. Slack	1st Missouri: Col John T. Hughes, Ltc James Pritchard; Thornton's Battalion: Maj John C. Thornton; 1st Cavalry: Col Benjamin A. Rives
Sixth Division BG Mosby Parsons	Kelly's Missouri Regiment: Col Joseph Kelly; Dills' Battalion: Maj George K. Dills; 1st Missouri Cavalry: Col Ben Brown; Alexander's Cavalry: Cpt ___ Alexander; Crews' Cavalry: Cpt ___ Crews; Guibor's Battery (4 guns): Cpt Henry Guibor
Eighth Division BG James Spencer Rains; Col Richard Hanson Weightman	2nd Regiment: Col John R. Graves; 3rd Regiment: Col Edgar V. Hurst; O'Kane's Battalion: Ltc Walter S. O'Kane; Independent Detachment: Cpt Francis P. McKinney; 2nd Cavalry (1st Battalion Independent): Col James McCown; 3rd Cavalry, Companies A, B, & H (part): Col Robert Y. Peyton; 7th Cavalry, Boughan's Battalion: Ltc Richard A. Boughan; Bledsoe's Battery (3 guns): Cpt Hiram M. Bledsoe

Note: Several independent cavalry units were attached to Rains' Eighth Division. Among these a contingent of 150 mounted troops under the command of Capt. Jo Shelby distinguished themselves on the vanguard of the Southern action throughout the battle. From daring battlefield maneuvers under fire by Sigel's batteries to pressing Sigel's retreat to Sarcoxie, Shelby's cavalry "snatched the victory at Carthage from Sigel's grasp." Altogether, the Missouri State Guard included over 2,000 unarmed men who did not participate in the battle.

== See also ==
- Missouri in the American Civil War
