= James S. Rains =

American politician

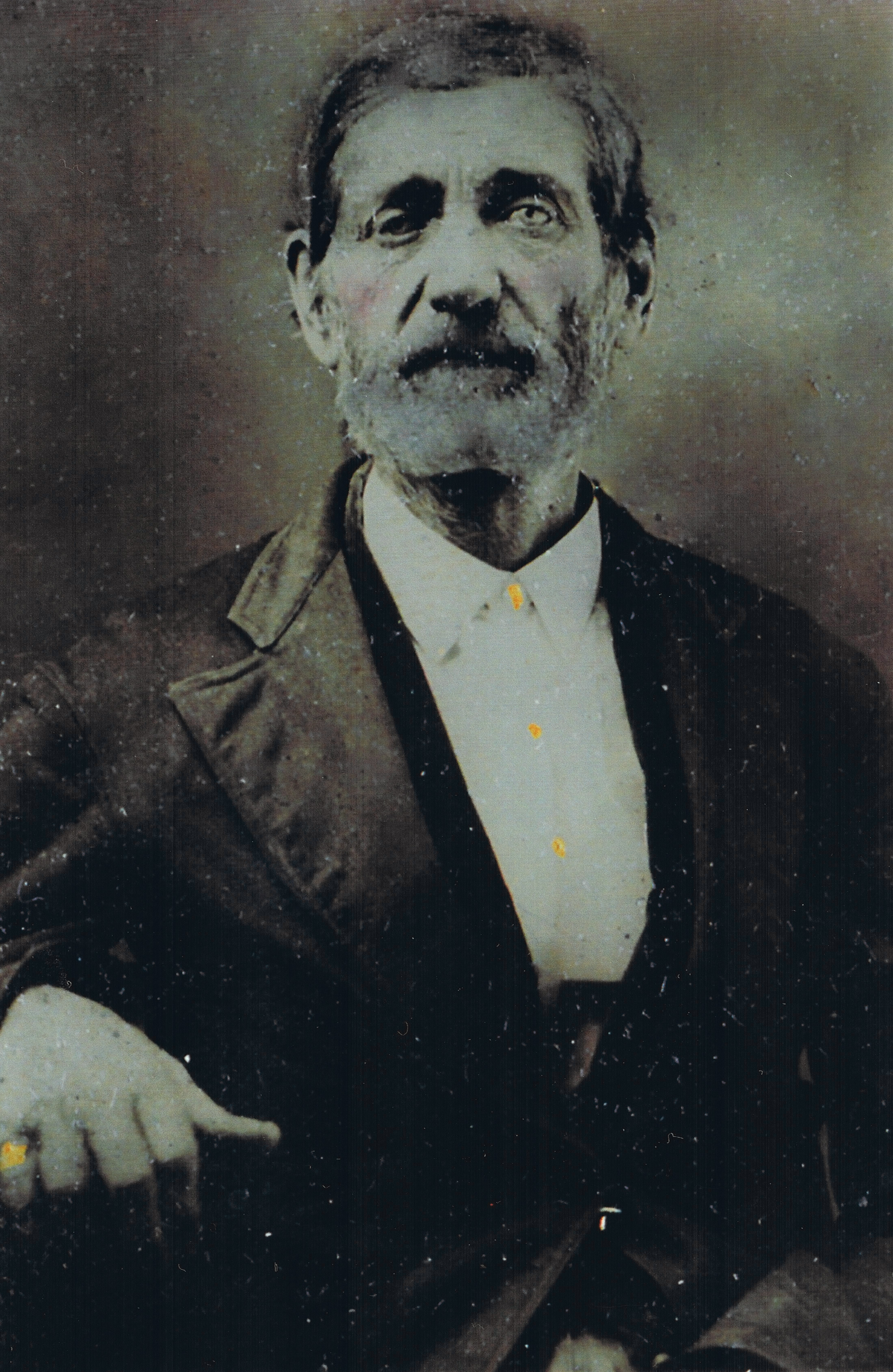
- Born: James Spencer Rains; October 2, 1817; Tennessee (probably Warren County), US
- Died: May 19, 1880 (aged 62); Kaufman County, Texas, US
- Burial place: Seagoville, Texas, US; 32°39′19.5″N 96°33′23.0″W
- Relatives: Emory Rains (brother)
- Military career
- Allegiance: Missouri (Confederate)
- Branch: Missouri State Guard
- Service years: 1861–1862, 1864
- Rank: Brigadier-General
- Commands: 8th Division, Missouri State Guard
- Conflicts: American Civil War: Battle of Carthage; Battle of Dug Springs; Battle of Wilson's Creek; Siege of Lexington; Battle of Pea Ridge (WIA); Price's Missouri Expedition

James S. Rains (October 2, 1817 – May 19, 1880) was a senior officer of the Missouri State Guard (MSG) who fought in the Trans-Mississippi Theater of the American Civil War. Born in Tennessee, Rains moved to Missouri by 1840, and was a farmer, politician, judge, and militia officer. He also served as an Indian agent from 1845 to 1849, and participated in the California Gold Rush. He was appointed to command of the 8th Division of the MSG in May 1861, and may have commanded all MSG forces at the Battle of Carthage later that year. In August, his men were routed at the Battle of Dug Springs, an incident which became known as "Rains's Scare".

He saw further action in the battles of Wilson's Creek, Lexington, and Pea Ridge in 1861 and 1862. Despite being a militia officer and not part of the Confederate States Army, he commanded Confederate troops in late 1862 before being removed from command for incompetence and drunkenness. After his removal from command, he moved to Texas, where his brother, Emory Rains, resided. In 1864, he recruited in Missouri during Price's Missouri Expedition, taking his men to Arkansas after that campaign failed. After the war ended, he remained in Texas, where he gained prominence as a farmer and was involved in the Grange movement and the Greenback Party, losing the 1878 election for Lieutenant Governor of Texas as a Greenback candidate. While campaigning for the Greenbacks in the 1880 United States presidential election, he died on May 19, of apoplexy.

== Early life and career ==
James Spencer Rains was born on October 2, 1817, within the state of Tennessee. Historian Bruce S. Allardice believes that his birthplace was most likely in Warren County. Alexander Duncan was his uncle, and Emory Rains was his brother. By 1840, he resided in Newton County, Missouri. He took up farming in Newton County and Jasper County, and spent much of his life near Sarcoxie. He served in the militia and was a judge in Newton County from 1840 to 1842.

Having a significant interest in politics, Rains was elected to the Missouri House of Representatives in 1844 as a Democrat, from a seat representing Newton County. The following year, President of the United States James Knox Polk appointed Rains as an Indian agent. Originally assigned to the Neosho Agency in what is now northeastern Oklahoma, he was transferred to the Osage River Agency in Kansas Territory in 1848. Rains was part of the Missouri delegation to the 1848 Democratic National Convention. Early in the following year, he was removed from his position as Indian agent because of alleged misconduct at the Neosho Agency post. Traveling to California in 1850, he helped organize state militia, as well as participating in the California Gold Rush. He became a general in the California militia.

Returning to Missouri in 1852, he re-entered politics. Rains switched his political allegiance from the Democrats to the Know-Nothings, as he believed that secessionist former Whigs were taking over the Democratic Party. In 1855, he was elected to a seat in the Missouri Senate, and was re-elected in 1858, although he lost a bid for election to the United States Congress in 1860 running as a Constitutional Unionist. He broke with his former Unionist sentiments after the election of Abraham Lincoln in the 1860 United States Presidential Election, and developed ties with the breakaway Confederate States of America. He refused an election to the United States Congress in 1861 due to his pro-Confederate sympathies.

== American Civil War ==
=== Recruiting and Carthage ===
Map of the geographic divisions of the Missouri State Guard. Rains commanded the 8th District.

After the Camp Jackson affair in May 1861 galvanized Missouri secessionists, and the state government created the pro-secession Missouri State Guard (MSG), a militia organization. Rains was appointed to command the 8th District of the MSG. Rains' brigadier general's commission dated to May 18. Rains was an effective recruiter, but proved to have little military talent. One of Rains' friends stated that he was "profoundly ignorant of everything related to military affairs" and historians William Garrett Piston and Richard W. Hatcher refer to him as "the poorest commander in the Missouri State Guard". Historian Thomas W. Cutrer described Rains as "manifestly incompetent".

After the Missouri State Guard was defeated by Union Army forces at the Battle of Boonville, MSG commander Sterling Price ordered Rains and Brigadier General William Y. Slack to form their commands at Lexington, Missouri, and then head south. Rains was in overall command of the column southbound from Lexington, as he had recruited the majority of its men. The troops marched to Lamar in the southwestern portion of the state.

On July 5, the Battle of Carthage, Missouri, was fought, pitting the MSG against Union Army forces led by Franz Sigel. Governor of Missouri Claiborne Fox Jackson was in nominal command of the MSG, but allegedly turned over command of the force to Rains despite several other officers having more military experience than him, supposedly due to the fact that Rains led the largest MSG force on the field. The MSG held good terrain, although this was more by accident than tactical planning, and Rains positioned himself on the far right of the MSG line, where even if he was in command of the whole MSG force, he would only be able to command the cavalry of his own force. In the words of historians David C. Hinze and Karen Farnham, Rains was "unable to conceptualize battle beyond a regimental scope" and "did little to help the confused situation and in fact made it substantially worse".

During the fighting at Carthage, Rains personally led a 250-man battalion in an attempt to outflank the Union line, Rains' cavalry was pounded by Union artillery fire, and he halted his troops in some woods to reform. Seeing Union forces retreating but isolated from the rest of the MSG, Rains decided to move his men south to try to cut off the Union retreat. Later in the battle, Rains' force became the only MSG unit with a chance of cutting off the Union retreat, but Rains halted the unit so that he could go find the rest of the MSG and confer with other officers. He was eventually unable to prevent the Union forces from reaching the Spring River; Hinze and Farnham blame the failure to cut off the Union retreat on inept leadership of the MSG cavalry.

=== Dug Springs, Wilson's Creek, and Lexington ===
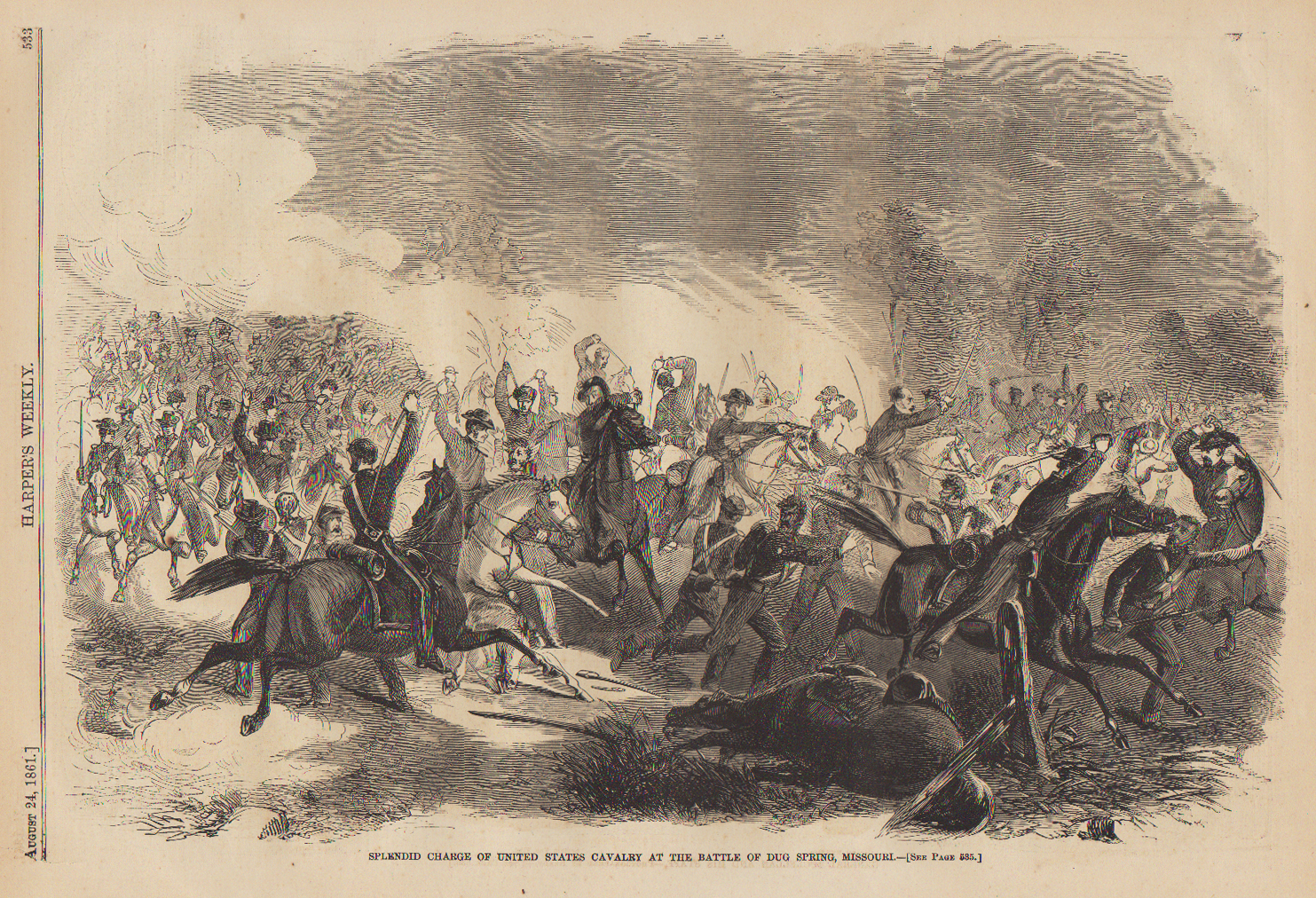
The fighting at Dug Springs

On August 2, Rains' men were routed in the Battle of Dug Springs and fled in panic; the incident became known as "Rains's Scare" and contributed to Confederate Brigadier General Ben McCulloch, who was operating in junction with Price, forming a poor opinion of the quality of the MSG. Rains' men joined Price's and McCulloch's men in camping along Wilson's Creek on August 6. Along with several other MSG officers, Rains joined Price on August 9 in pushing McCulloch to order an attack for the next day. Early in the morning of August 10, Rains was informed that a forage train had sighted Brigadier General Nathaniel Lyon's Union forces advancing against the camp. Rains sent messengers to Price and McCulloch; the Battle of Wilson's Creek was about to begin.

The first major response to Lyon's approach resulted from the individual initiative of one of Rains' subordinates, Colonel James Cawthorn. Rains' cavalry were among the first hit by Lyon's attack, and while some conducted a fighting retreat, others joined camp followers in what an eyewitness referred to as a "panic-stricken drove". The infantry portion of his division was engaged in the later stages of the fighting. Of the MSG units present at Wilson's Creek, Rains' division suffered the lowest casualty rate. After Wilson's Creek, Price sent Rains and his men to disperse some Kansas Jayhawkers. Rains made it to Stockton, where he incorrectly determined that the Kansans were more than his force could handle, so Price brought up the rest of the MSG and defeated them in the Battle of Dry Wood Creek on September 2.

Price continued north with the MSG to Lexington, which Rains' men reached on September 13. After brief fighting, Rains' men withdrew, but Price, after receiving ammunition supplies, surrounded the Union garrison on September 18. Rains' division was on the east side of the Union position in the Siege of Lexington. The garrison surrendered on September 19 after the MSG advanced up the hill, pushing waterlogged hemp bales in front of them as protection.

=== Later service ===
In early March 1862, Rains' MSG division fought in the Battle of Pea Ridge, attacking Union positions near Elkhorn Tavern. He was wounded during the battle. As the Confederates were retreating after Pea Ridge, Rains verbally harangued Confederate officer Earl Van Dorn in his presence and was temporarily arrested. Despite lacking a commission in the Confederate States Army, Rains commanded Confederate troops at times. Hindman reported that he had accepted Rains and other MSG officers into the Confederate army, in order to prevent a separate state force from reforming, but Rains continued to command as a militia officer. When Major General Thomas C. Hindman pushed Confederate forces into northwestern Arkansas and southwestern Missouri in August 1862, Rains commanded his infantry force, which was stationed at Elkhorn Tavern. On September 10, when Hindman had to return to Little Rock, Arkansas, Rains was placed in command in Hindman's absence, with orders to hold the line and not begin an offensive. According to historian William L. Shea, Rains spent his time in command at Elkhorn Tavern "playing cards and consuming copious amounts of whiskey".

Union attacks in September and October drove the outlying Confederate cavalry back, with Rains and the infantry making a difficult withdrawal across the Boston Mountains as well. Historian Mark K. Christ stated that Rains and Douglas H. Cooper "bungled the situation in northwestern Arkansas". Hindman had Rains removed from command in October for incompetence and drunkenness. Allardice speculates that the latter allegation was probably true, as Rains was later reprimanded by a Missouri politician for an ambulance crash. The wreck in question occurred on Christmas 1864; in the words of historian William Royston Geise, the incident was "an episode of drunken driving that reads as if it is a century ahead of its time". Shea attributes the cause of the dismissal to Rains entering a state of drunken stupor, stating that Rains' drinking binge constituted "a significant contribution to the Confederate war effort" because it led to his removal. After being removed from command, Rains moved to Texas, where his brother Emory lived. In 1864, he followed Price on his Missouri Expedition, where he recruited. When Price's campaign ended in failure, Rains took his recruits to Arkansas, where they entered Confederate service.

== Later life and death ==
After the war, Rains first lived in Wood County, Texas, and then later Kaufman County, Texas. He gained prominence as a farmer, and was also a promoter for railroads and a lawyer. Initially returning to Democratic Party politics, he became involved in the Grange movement in the 1870s and joined the Greenback Party. As the Greenback candidate, he lost the 1878 election for the Lieutenant Governor of Texas. In 1880, he campaigned for the Greenbacks in the United States Presidential election. He was selected to be a delegate to the 1880 Greenback National Convention, but died on May 19, 1880, at his home in Kaufman County, due to apoplexy. He was buried in Seagoville, Texas.

== Sources ==
- Allardice, Bruce S. (1995). More Generals in Gray. Baton Rouge, Louisiana: Louisiana State University Press. ISBN 0-8071-1967-9.
- Bearss, Edwin C. (April 1966). "The Army of the Frontier's First Campaign: The Confederates Win at Newtonia". Missouri Historical Review. 60 (3). State Historical Society of Missouri: 283–319. ISSN 0026-6582. OCLC 1758409.
- Castel, Albert E. (1993) [1968]. General Sterling Price and the Civil War in the West. Baton Rouge, Louisiana: Louisiana State University Press. ISBN 0-8071-1854-0.
- Christ, Mark K. (2010). Civil War Arkansas 1863: The Battle for a State. Norman, Oklahoma: University of Oklahoma Press. ISBN 978-0-8061-4433-7.
- Cutrer, Thomas W. (2017). Theater of a Separate War: The Civil War West of the Mississippi River 1861–1865. Chapel Hill, North Carolina: University of North Carolina Press. ISBN 978-1-4696-3156-1.
- Geise, William Royston (2022). Forsyth, Michael J. (ed.). The Confederate Military Forces in the Trans-Mississippi West, 1861–1865. El Dorado Hills, California: Savas Beatie. ISBN 978-1-61121-621-9.
- Hinze, David C.; Farnham, Karen (2004) [1997]. The Battle of Carthage: Border War In Southwest Missouri July 5, 1861 (First Pelican ed.). Gretna, Louisiana: Pelican Publishing. ISBN 1-58980-223-3.
- Piston, William Garrett; Hatcher, Richard W. (2000). Wilson's Creek: The Second Battle of the Civil War and the Men Who Fought It. Chapel Hill, North Carolina: University of North Carolina Press. ISBN 0-8078-2515-8.
- Shea, William L.; Hess, Earl J. (1992). Pea Ridge: Civil War Campaign in the West. Chapel Hill: University of North Carolina Press. ISBN 0-8078-4669-4.
- Shea, William L. (2009). Fields of Blood: The Prairie Grove Campaign. Chapel Hill, North Carolina: University of North Carolina Press. ISBN 978-0-8078-3315-5.
