= Liberty Arsenal =

United States Army arsenal

Coordinates: 39.19906°N 94.4065°W

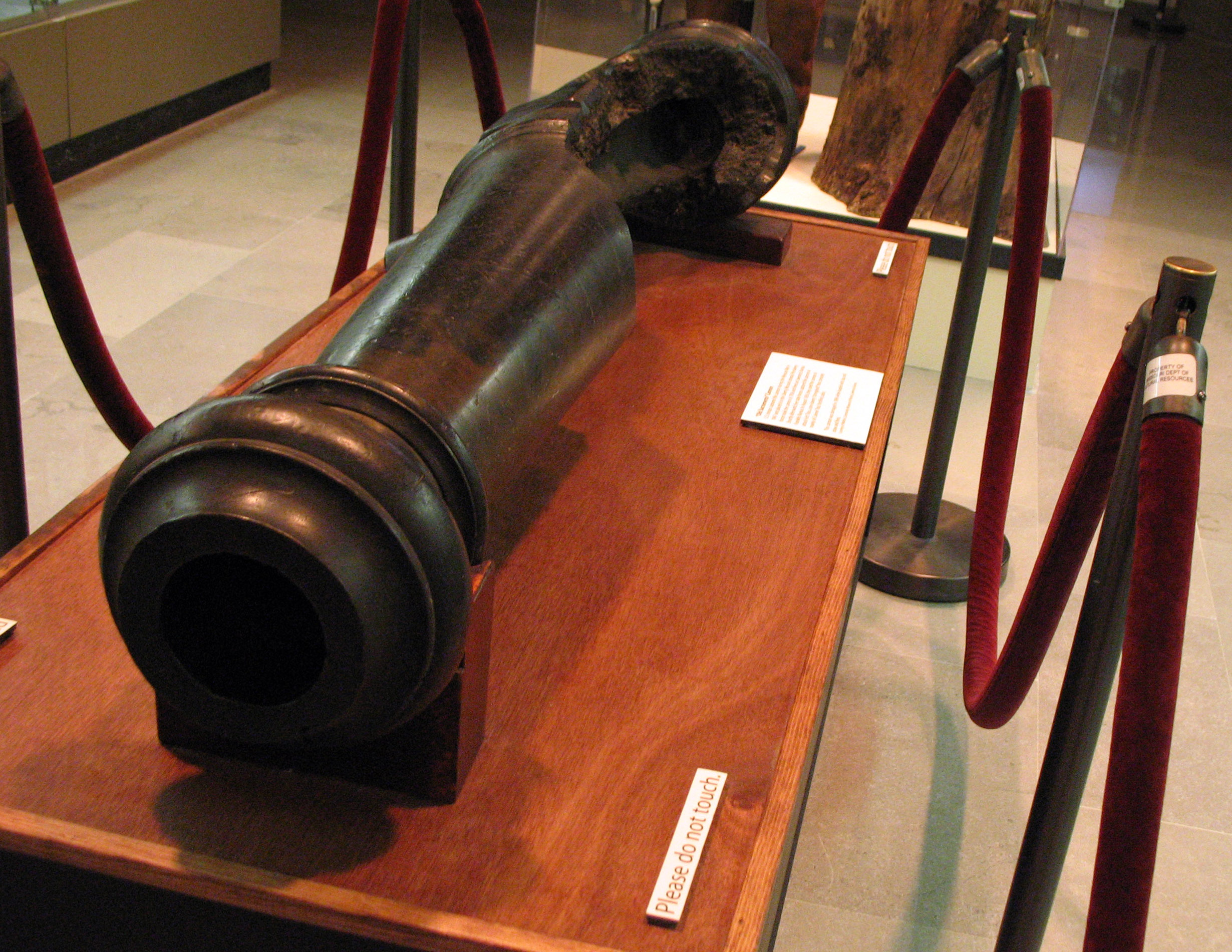
"Old Sacramento Cannon" captured by U.S. during the Mexican–American War in 1847 and taken to the Liberty Arsenal. The cannon was seized by pro-slavery forces in 1856 and fired during the Sacking of Lawrence in 1856. The cannon was damaged in 1896 when it was loaded with clay and straw and fired.

The Liberty Arsenal, known by Federal authorities as the Missouri Depot was a United States Army arsenal at Liberty, Missouri in Clay County, Missouri. The depot was seized twice by Southern partisans, once during the Kansas troubles in 1855, and again shortly after the outbreak of the American Civil War. It was located generally west of the junction of Missouri Route 291 and old 210 Highway.

== Construction of the arsenal ==
On July 2, 1836, President Andrew Jackson signed a bill authorizing construction of an arsenal on the western frontier of Missouri, and on June 30, 1837, the Federal government obtained a deed to ten acres of land near Liberty. Construction of the arms depot was completed in 1839 and on September 30, 1841, the War Department reported that the arsenal consisted of one building for officers' quarters, one building for men's quarters, one storehouse, one magazine, three workshops, one armory, two gun sheds and two laboratories. At that time the whole amount, expended for the Liberty Arsenal from its first establishment amounted to $26,435.96.

== Bleeding Kansas ==
During the period when the free or slave state status of Kansas was still an open question, pro-slavery residents of Clay County frequently crossed the border to vote in Kansas territorial elections and participated in armed incursions to oppose Free State elements in the territory. This is known as the "Bleeding Kansas" period. On December 4, 1855, during the "Wakarusa War", a company of over 100 armed Clay County volunteers, led by Judge James Turner Vance Thompson and Missouri Maj. Ebenezer Price, seized the arsenal. The custodian of the facility, U.S. Maj. Luther Leonard, and his six employees were placed under arrest, while much of the arms and equipment were removed. The arsenal at that time contained: three brass six-pounder cannon, 55 rifles, 67 cavalry sabres, 100 dragoon pistols, 20 Colt revolvers, accoutrements, equipment, and ammunition.

On December 10, 1855, Captain William N. R. Beall of the 1st U.S. Cavalry moved to the arsenal with a cavalry company to prevent another raid and to recover what had already been taken. The pro-slavery forces had concluded their foray against Lawrence, Kansas, and the Wakarusa War had ended with a treaty a few days before. Therefore, after Capt. Beall discussed the matter of the arsenal weapons with prominent local citizens, most of the material was returned.

== American Civil War ==
After states began seceding from the Union, the Missouri Constitutional Convention of 1861 voted, 98–1, on March 21, 1861, to stay in the Union but not to supply men or money to either side. On April 12, 1861, the Civil War officially began with the firing on Fort Sumter.

Ardent secessionists in western Missouri again eyed the Liberty Arsenal. A large company of Clay County militia led by Colonel Henry Lewis Routt and a Jackson County militia company captained by John H. McMurray of Independence, about 200 men in all, forced their way into the arsenal on April 20, 1861. The depot's caretaker, Major Nathaniel Grant, with only two employees, could do nothing but protest the forcible takeover. The event has sometimes been called the "Missouri Fort Sumter." This was the first armed action against the Federal Government in Missouri and was one of the earliest actions of the Civil War west of the Mississippi River. The raid left the St. Louis Arsenal as the only other Federal military arsenal in the entire state.

The Southern sympathizers captured three six-pounder brass cannons and carriages; 12 unmounted six-pounder iron guns; one three-pounder iron gun; two battery wagons; five caissons; two forges, artillery equipment and several hundred rounds of artillery ammunition (mostly solid shot and canister.) They also took 1,180 percussion muskets, 243 percussion rifles, 121 rifle carbines, 923 percussion pistols, 419 cavalry sabers, 39 cavalry swords, 20 cavalry and artillery musketoons, 400,000 cartridges, 1,000 pounds of cannon powder, 9,900 pounds of musket powder, and 1,800 pounds of rifle powder. While substantial, this pales compared to the 37,000 muskets and rifles believed to have been kept at St. Louis.

A portion of the secessionist force held the depot for a week as they removed the materials. Some was taken to Routt's home on East Franklin Street in Liberty, Missouri near what is now William Jewell College. His ice-house was converted into an armory for distributing weapons to Missouri Militiamen and later to the Missouri State Guard. The brass field pieces became Capt. Henry Guibor's State Guard battery. The kegs of powder were hidden throughout the countryside. A portion of the arms were shipped upriver to the charge of St. Joseph mayor M. Jeff Thompson. Because of this and other activities, Routt was captured in March 1862, tried for treason, and sentenced to hang, but was pardoned in April by Lincoln citing Missouri Governor Gamble's amnesty program.

Union Captain Nathaniel Lyon, fearing that the much larger St. Louis Arsenal could also fall, secured the St. Louis Arsenal on April 29 and in May began sending most of its munitions safely to Illinois, out of the reach of Missouri's secessionists.

Capt. O.P. Moss, a Mexican War veteran and leader of the Unionist Liberty Home Guards (formed only a few days later, on April 24) characterized the seizure of the arsenal this way: "Col. Routt had no more right to capture the Liberty Arsenal, with its government arms and munitions, than John Brown had to seize the one at Harper's Ferry."

== Closure and historic marker ==
Major Grant continued as custodian of the depot until it was sold in 1869 (via a July 25, 1868 act of Congress.)

The Arsenal was sold at auction on December 18, 1869, to Amos S. Kimball for $8,012.50. In the years that followed, the property was used for farming, and the buildings were gradually demolished. The bricks were salvaged and sold for reuse in homes and other buildings in Liberty and nearby communities.

On October 6, 2012, an historic marker was placed at the highway intersection near the site once occupied by the arsenal. None of the buildings remain and the land is privately owned.
