= Edwin Williamson Price =

Confederate States Army officer (1834–1908)

Edwin W. Price
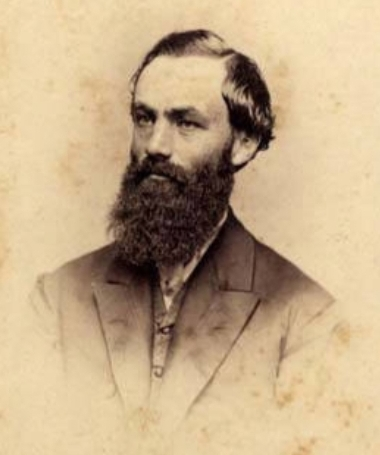
- Born: 1834 or 1835; Missouri, US
- Died: January 4, 1908 (aged 73); St. Louis, Missouri, US
- Relatives: Sterling Price (father)
- Military career
- Allegiance: Confederate States
- Branch: Missouri State Guard
- Rank: Brigadier general
- Battles: American Civil War; Battle of Carthage; Battle of Dry Wood Creek; First Battle of Lexington

Edwin Williamson Price (1834 or 1835 – January 4, 1908) was a Missouri State Guard officer during the American Civil War, rising to the rank of brigadier general.

== Early life ==
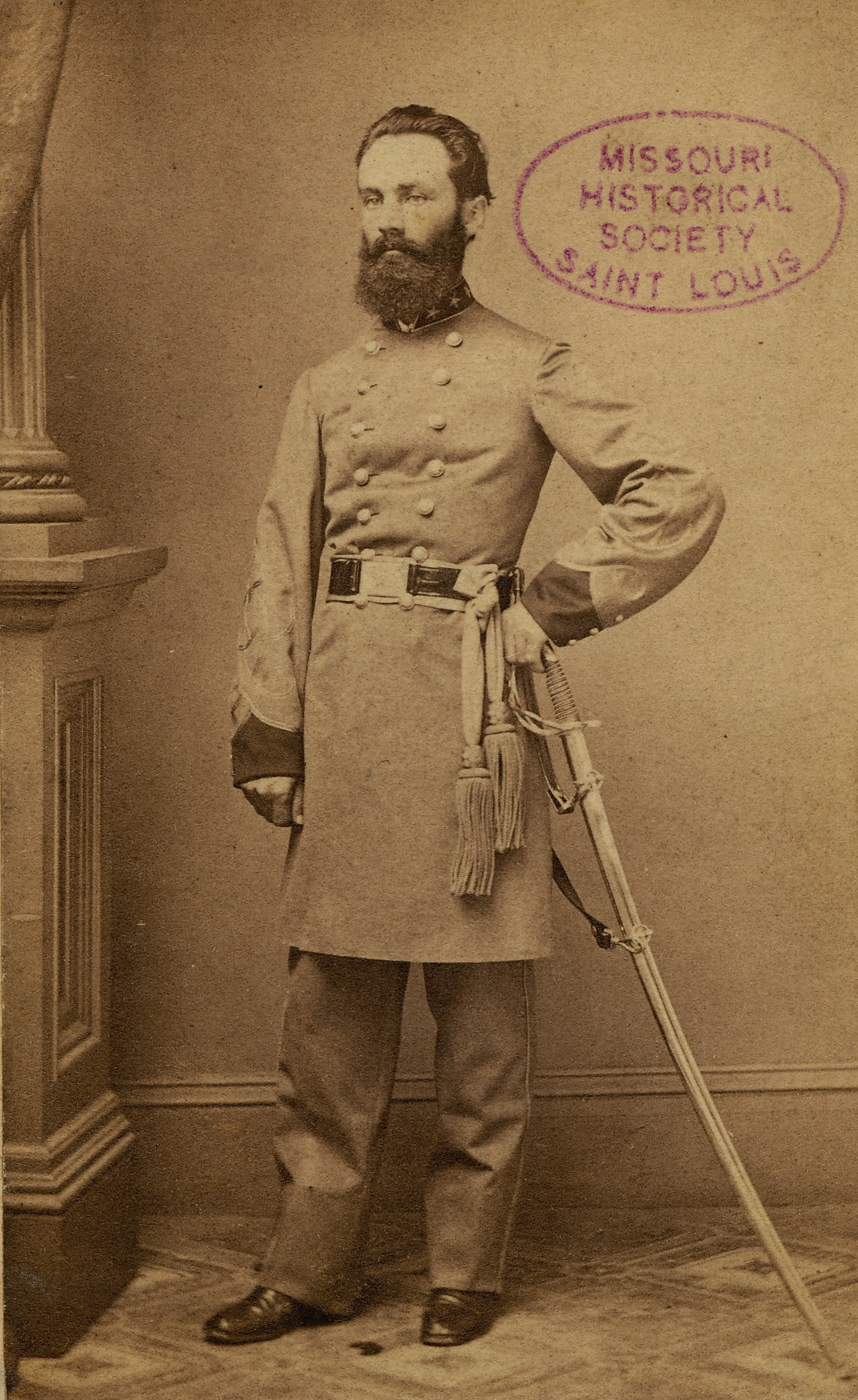
Gen. Ed. Price, 1861–1865

Edwin W. Price, eldest child of General Sterling Price, was a native Missourian. He was educated in the common schools of his county and the State University at Columbia. Upon leaving the university he married Miss Kittie Bradford, of Boone County, on May 1, 1855. He took his young wife to his farm in Chariton County, where they lived until the breaking out of the American Civil War in 1861.

== Civil War ==
He volunteered in the first company raised in his county, and was elected captain by acclamation. He and his lieutenants immediately went to St. Louis and reported to General Frost, who was in command of a camp of instruction under the State law, and remained there until the day Camp Jackson surrendered. On the morning of May 10, 1861, Captain Price, not anticipating any trouble in camp that day, asked permission of General Frost to allow him and his officers to visit the city for the purpose of purchasing a uniform for his company. The request was granted, and by noon they had accomplished their mission. Captain Price invited his officers to dine with him and his father at the Planters' Hotel. His father was then State Bank Examiner and boarding there.

Upon reaching the hotel they met General Sterling Price, who, upon seeing his son and his lieutenants, asked what they were doing there, and when informed that they had come to dine with him remarked: "Gentlemen, you have no time to dine. Lyon is marching upon your camp." There was a carriage in front of the hotel. He pointed to the carriage and said: "Go with all possible speed to Gen. Frost, and ascertain from him if he intends to fight. If so, take a musket and stay with him. If not, however, say to the General that I have advised you to make your escape, if possible, and return to your company." Upon their return to camp General Frost told them he was sorry they had returned, for he felt it was impossible to get away. They replied that with his permission they would make the effort. He told them to go if they could. They did not take time to go to their tent for their baggage, but entered a carriage and drove leisurely between the lines of the Union forces to the nearest railway station, and made their escape from the city. As soon as a battalion was raised in Chariton County Captain Price was elected lieutenant colonel. After taking part, with his command, at the battles of Carthage, Drywood, and Lexington, he was elected colonel, and soon after the election of General John B. Clark, Sr., to the Confederate States Senate Colonel Price was elected brigadier general of his brigade. At that time he was twenty-seven years old.

== Later life ==
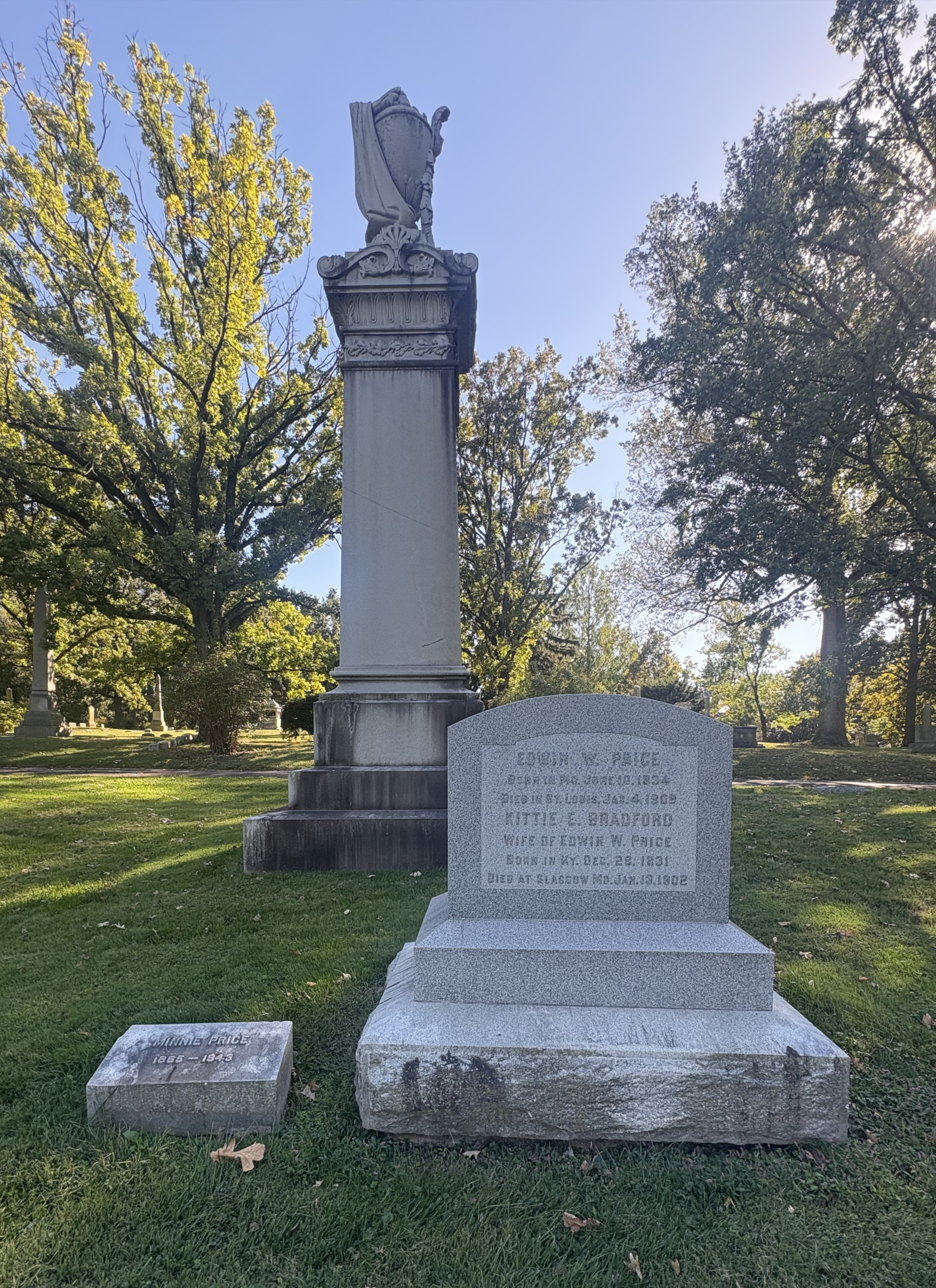
Price's grave at Bellefontaine Cemetery

In January 1903 he was living upon his farm in Chariton County, and was active in business. In 1908, Price's home was in Keytesville, where he had banking and farming interests. He died in St. Louis in the night of January 4, 1908, aged seventy-three years. He was buried at Bellefontaine Cemetery.

== See also ==
- List of Missouri Confederate Civil War units

== Sources ==
- Wallace, J. C. (December 1903). "Gen. E. W. Price". Confederate Veteran. Vol. 11, No. 12. p. 544.
- "'Pap' Price's Son". St. Joseph News-Press. January 6, 1908. p. 2.
