= Henry Lewis Routt =

American soldier

Henry L. Routt
- Born: April 24, 1824; Woodford County, Kentucky U.S.
- Died: February 23, 1881 (aged 56); Clay County, Missouri, U.S.
- Burial place: Fairview Cemetery Liberty, Missouri
- Military career
- Conflicts: Mexican–American War; Bleeding Kansas; American Civil War

Henry L. Routt (April 24, 1824 – February 23, 1881) was a veteran of the Mexican–American War and a Border Ruffian during the Bleeding Kansas troubles. He was one of those present in the first seizure of the Liberty Arsenal in 1855 and was the leader of the second seizure of the arsenal in 1861 during the American Civil War. For this and other acts, he was captured, tried by a military court, sentenced to hang, but spared by Abraham Lincoln.

== Biography ==
=== Early life ===
Henry Routt was born in Woodford County, Kentucky. His grave monument and an obituary imply that he was born in 1817 or 1818, although other sources give his date of birth as April 22, 1824.

=== Pre-war business ===
Henry was an attorney in Liberty Missouri. He is described as standing 6 ft 2.5 inches and having wavy, dark red hair.

He did not have red hair, it was dark brown

=== Mexican-American War ===
Routt served as adjutant to Lt. Col. William Gilpin the Santa Fe Trace Battalion of Missouri volunteers during the Mexican War. This unit was formed to keep the Santa Fe trail open. Becoming ill during the campaign, Routt was left with the garrison at Fort Mann (Kansas Territory). When friendly Pawnees approached and entered the Fort, Routt ordered them arrested until the commander returned. When they attempted to flee, nine were killed.

=== Arsenal seizures ===
Routt was a participant in the first Liberty Arsenal raid in 1855, when Missouri border ruffians seized weapons from the arsenal to use against Lawrence, Kansas during the "Wakarusa War". The matter was resolved shortly thereafter and most of the weapons were returned to Federal authorities.

He agitated heavily against opponents to slavery. This included an attack with a revolver and Bowie knife on a Union man because the man would not sell his military outfit goods on credit. On April 20, 1861, he led approximately 200 men in yet another seizure of the Liberty arsenal. This time the arms were not returned and were instead used to arm secessionist militia and later Missouri State Guard.

=== Battle of Lexington ===
Prior to the Siege of Lexington, before Col. James A. Mulligan arrived and when only a few companies of Home Guard were present, Routt acting as a colonel with around 800 recruits arrived in the vicinity and arrested several prominent Unionists including former Missouri Governor Austin A. King. Routt's force swelled to around 1200 and he demanded the Home Guard's surrender, but they refused. When it was learned that Union cavalry had been dispatched to relieve the post, Routt withdrew and eventually linked with Sterling Price. Routt's recruits were absorbed into other units and he returned home in autumn of 1861.

=== Capture, trial, and pardon ===
Routt was arrested on March 17, 1862, and tried by a military tribunal for treason and inciting rebellion. He was found guilty of the charges and sentenced to death by hanging. However, Union governor of Missouri Hamilton Rowan Gamble had offered clemency for those who had peacefully returned home. President Lincoln pardoned Routt on April 16, 1862.

=== Death ===
Despite his dubious history, Routt became a judge post-war. Henry Routt died peacefully at his home on February 23, 1881.

== See also ==
- Lexington Historical Museum

Clay County Museum, Liberty, MO
