= Emmett MacDonald =

American Confederate military officer

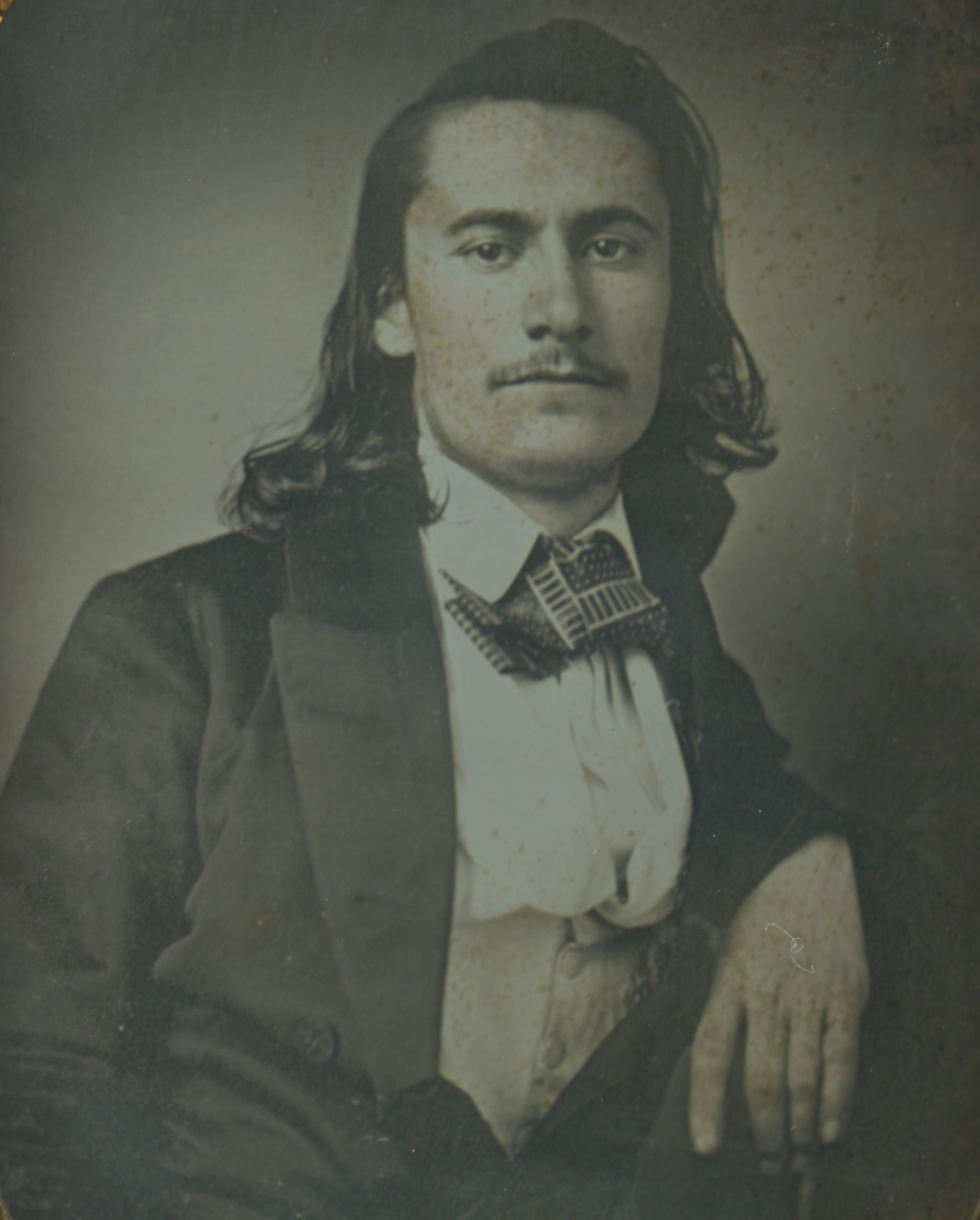
- Born: 1834; Steubenville, Ohio
- Died: January 11, 1863 (aged 28–29); Hartville, Missouri
- Burial place: Bellefontaine Cemetery
- Military career
- Allegiance: Confederate States of America
- Branch: Missouri State Guard; Confederate States Army
- Service years: 1861–1863
- Rank: Colonel
- Commands: MacDonald's Missouri Battery; MacDonald's Missouri Cavalry Battalion
- Conflicts: American Civil War; Battle of Boonville; Battle of Carthage; Battle of Wilson's Creek; Siege of Lexington; Battle of Pea Ridge; Siege of Corinth; Battle of Cane Hill; Battle of Prairie Grove; Second Battle of Springfield; Battle of Hartville
- Other work: Attorney

Emmett MacDonald was a military officer who served in the Confederate States Army during the American Civil War. MacDonald was born in Ohio in 1834, but moved to Missouri in the early 1850s. A lawyer in St. Louis, MacDonald participated in a pro-secession militia gathering that ended in the Camp Jackson affair in May 1861; MacDonald was imprisoned for a time after he refused to take parole. After his release, McDonald joined a new pro-secession and pro-Confederate militia unit known as the Missouri State Guard. While with the Missouri State Guard, MacDonald served as a captain of artillery and was a staff officer to Sterling Price. In October, he joined what became the 3rd Missouri Light Battery and was its first commander, fighting at the Battle of Pea Ridge and the Siege of Corinth.

In mid-1862, MacDonald was transferred to the Trans-Mississippi Department where he served as a provost marshal and attempted to recruit a cavalry unit. While his recruiting was unsuccessful, MacDonald took command of John S. Marmaduke's provost guard in November after it was reorganized. MacDonald led his command in the Battle of Cane Hill and then led a brigade in the Battle of Prairie Grove. In January 1863, MacDonald and his unit participated in Marmaduke's First Missouri Raid. After fighting in the Second Battle of Springfield, MacDonald was killed on January 11 while leading a different command in a charge in the Battle of Hartville.

== Biography ==
Emmett MacDonald was born to immigrant parents in Steubenville, Ohio, in 1834, as the fifth of eight children. MacDonald's father was related to the Scottish families Clan Campbell and Clan MacDonald. The MacDonalds moved to Missouri in the early 1850s. Emmett entered the legal profession at St. Louis and served with the Missouri Volunteer Militia, including in patrols along the Missouri-Kansas border in 1860. He was back in St. Louis by April 1861. In May, pro-secession state militia mustered near St. Louis, with MacDonald participating. In the Camp Jackson affair, the militia was captured by Federal forces led by Nathaniel Lyon. MacDonald was the only militiaman present who would not accept the terms of parole offered, and he was imprisoned in Illinois until ordered released by a judge who ruled that the militia muster had been legal. Once released, MacDonald joined the Missouri State Guard, which was a new pro-secession and pro-Confederate militia organization.

As part of the Missouri State Guard, MacDonald fought at the Battles of Boonville, Carthage, Wilson's Creek, and Lexington as a captain of artillery and staff officer for Sterling Price. After Wilson's Creek, MacDonald commanded the escort given to Federal general Nathaniel Lyon's body. In October, MacDonald joined the unit that became the 3rd Missouri Light Battery, becoming the battery's first commander. MacDonald's battery transferred to the Confederate Army in January 1862, and the unit saw action in the Battle of Pea Ridge and the Siege of Corinth.

Promoted to colonel in July 1862, MacDonald was assigned to recruiting the next month. As MacDonald was transferred to the Trans-Mississippi Department, he did not return to his artillery battery, which was reorganized in September; MacDonald was dropped from the unit's rolls and a new commander was appointed. In August, he had been appointed provost marshal for Missouri by Confederate general Thomas C. Hindman. At that time, Missouri was subject to disorganized recruiting by both Confederate and Missouri State Guard officials, and both the recruiters and partisan rangers operating in the area committed outrages against civilians, particularly theft. MacDonald's task was to bring order out of chaos. Anxious to retake Missouri for the Confederacy, MacDonald also presented Hindman with far-fetched and unrealistic plans, including one that suggested bringing a force into Kansas in order to leave "the whole Country devastated and laid waste", and then moving into Missouri, where MacDonald believed that 80,000 men could be recruited and armed with pikes. Other service performed by MacDonald for Hindman included conducting interviews to produce a report on a Confederate defeat at the Battle of Old Fort Wayne.

MacDonald had failed to recruit enough men to form a cavalry regiment, so he found himself commanding John S. Marmaduke's provost guard in November. On November 8, MacDonald commanded a small force that was defeated by Federal forces near Cane Hill, Arkansas. Later that month, Marmaduke was given permission to reorganize his provost guard into a regular unit to be commanded by MacDonald; this reorganization occurred on November 16. While the unit was generally referred to as a regiment, it was technically too small to be a regiment under Confederate law and was instead actually a battalion. (Note: This unit would eventually become the 10th Missouri Cavalry Regiment.) On November 28, MacDonald led his cavalry unit in the Battle of Cane Hill, and on December 7, he commanded a brigade at the Battle of Prairie Grove. Early in the action at Prairie Grove, MacDonald and his men saved Colonel Joseph O. Shelby from capture by Federal forces.

MacDonald then participated in Marmaduke's First Missouri Raid in January 1863. On January 7, his men captured a Federal fort between Forsyth, Missouri and Hartville, Missouri. Fighting in the Second Battle of Springfield on January 8, MacDonald's men were part of the left side of the Confederate line. On January 11, during the Battle of Hartville, MacDonald was impatient with the inactive role his unit was playing in the battle, and asked for and received permission to lead a different unit in a planned charge. Confederate forces later attempted to deploy two cannons, but after coming under Federal fire, the pieces were abandoned by their crews. MacDonald saw the abandoned pieces and led a charge to recover them. While the guns were brought back to Confederate lines, MacDonald was killed during the attack. He had been shot in the thigh.

The Federal authorities allowed MacDonald's body to be returned to his family, but a Federal provost in St. Louis prevented MacDonald from receiving a public burial. At first, he was buried in a potter's field cemetery, but was later moved to the Bellefontaine Cemetery by those close to him. Legend states that he had sworn not to have his hair cut until after the war.

== Sources ==
- Ingenthron, Elmo (1980). Borderland Rebellion: A History of the Civil War on the Missouri–Arkansas Border. Forsyth, Missouri: The Ozarks Mountaineer. OCLC 7157026.
- Kennedy, Frances H., ed. (1998). The Civil War Battlefield Guide (2nd ed.). Boston/New York: Houghton Mifflin. ISBN 978-0-395-74012-5.
- McGhee, James E. (2008). Guide to Missouri Confederate Regiments, 1861–1865. Fayetteville, Arkansas: University of Arkansas Press. ISBN 978-1-55728-870-7.
- Piston, William Garrett; Hatcher, Richard W. (2000). Wilson's Creek: The Second Battle of the Civil War and the Men Who Fought It. Chapel Hill, North Carolina: University of North Carolina Press. ISBN 0-8078-2515-8.
- Piston, William Garrett; Rutherford, John C. (2021). "We Gave Them Thunder": Marmaduke's Raid and the Civil War in Missouri and Arkansas. Springfield, Missouri: Ozarks Studies Institute. ISBN 978-1-7346290-1-9.
- Shea, William L. (2009). Fields of Blood: The Prairie Grove Campaign. Chapel Hill, North Carolina: University of North Carolina Press. ISBN 978-0-8078-3315-5.
- Sweeney, Thomas P.; Piston, William Garrett (2009). Portraits of Conflict: A Photographic History of Missouri in the Civil War. Fayetteville, Arkansas: University of Arkansas Press. ISBN 978-155728-913-1.
