= Henry Guibor =

- Born: c. 1823
- Died: October 17, 1899 (aged 75–76)
- Military career
- Allegiance: Confederate States
- Branch: Confederate States Army
- Rank: Captain
- Unit: Missouri State Guard
- Conflicts: U.S.-Mexican War; American Civil War

Henry Guibor (c. 1823 – October 17, 1899) was a Confederate artillery captain in the American Civil War.

Guibor hailed from St. Louis, Missouri, and served in the U.S.-Mexican War.

By the Civil War, Guibor was serving as an officer in the state militia artillery battery. Guibor, like many state militiamen, were arrested in the seizure of Camp Jackson in St. Louis by Nathaniel Lyon, but was soon paroled. Guibor eventually traveled southeast from St. Louis and joined Governor Claiborne Fox Jackson's Missouri State Guard. He received command of a battery of four six-pound smoothbore guns. Not long afterward, Guibor's battery saw action in the battles of Carthage, Wilson's Creek, Dry Wood Creek, and Lexington.

The battery was reorganized and mustered into Confederate service at Memphis, Tennessee, by December 1861. It was soon re-attached to Sterling Price's army and again saw action at the battles of Pea Ridge, Iuka, and Corinth.

Guibor's command then was transferred to John C. Pemberton's Confederate army securing portions of Mississippi. Guibor was wounded in an artillery duel with a Federal river squadron in the Battle of Grand Gulf. Guibor was captured with Pemberton's army in the fall of Vicksburg, Mississippi. Paroled, Guibor's command shifted to the defense of northern Georgia where he saw extensive action, including fighting around Atlanta, Georgia, where he was again wounded. His battery joined with John Bell Hood's army in the sweep north into Tennessee and was engaged in the battles of Franklin and Murfreesboro. Finally, Guibor and his men surrendered with remnants of Joseph E. Johnston's army in North Carolina on April 26, 1865.
