= Battle of Carthage =

Battle of Carthage may refer to:

- Siege of Carthage (Third Punic War)
- Battle of Carthage (238)
- Capture of Carthage (439)
- Battle of Ad Decimum
- Siege of Carthage (536)
- Battle of Carthage (698)
- Battle of Cartagena de Indias
- Battle of Carthage, Missouri
