= Battle of Carthage order of battle: Union =

List of the Union Army units in the Battle of Carthage of the American Civil War

The following Union Army units and commanders fought in the Battle of Carthage of the American Civil War. The Confederate order of battle is listed separately.

== Abbreviations used ==
=== Military Rank ===
- Col = Colonel
- Ltc = Lieutenant Colonel
- Maj = Major
- Cpt = Captain

== Union Forces ==
Col Franz Sigel

Units	
Infantry	3rd Missouri: Col Franz Sigel, Ltc Francis Hassendeubel; 5th Missouri: Col Charles E. Salomon
Artillery Maj Franz Backoff	Battery (4 guns): Cpt Christian Essig; Battery (4 guns): Cpt Theodore Wilkins

== See also ==
- Missouri in the American Civil War
