= 3rd Missouri Light Battery =

Artillery battery of the Confederate States Army

3rd Missouri Light Battery MacDonald's Missouri Battery Dawson's Missouri Battery St. Louis Artillery
- Active: January 28, 1862–May 4, 1865
- Allegiance: Confederate States of America
- Branch: Confederate States Army
- Type: Artillery
- Size: 100 (May 5, 1862)
- Equipment: 4 × 6-pounder smoothbore cannons (1862–1863); 4 × 20-pounder Parrott rifles (1864–1865)
- Engagements: American Civil War: Battle of Pea Ridge; Battle of Farmington, Mississippi; Battle of Iuka; Second Battle of Corinth; Battle of Davis Bridge; Battle of Champion Hill; Battle of Big Black River Bridge; Siege of Vicksburg; Battle of Spanish Fort

The 3rd Missouri Light Battery (also known as MacDonald's Missouri Battery and Dawson's Missouri Battery) was an artillery battery of the Confederate States Army during the American Civil War. The battery originated as a Missouri State Guard unit active in late 1861, and was officially transferred to the Confederate States Army on January 28, 1862. The battery provided artillery support at the Battle of Pea Ridge in March 1862, and was lightly engaged at the Battle of Iuka in September. In October 1862, the battery was lightly engaged at the Second Battle of Corinth and saw action at the Battle of Davis Bridge, where it lost at least one cannon. The 3rd Light Battery saw action at the Battle of Champion Hill on May 16, 1863, and had its cannons captured at the Battle of Big Black River Bridge the next day. After participating in the Siege of Vicksburg, the battery was captured on July 4, 1863, and was paroled and exchanged. The battery was then consolidated with the Jackson Missouri Battery; the 3rd Light Battery designation was continued. In early 1864, the battery received replacement cannons and was assigned to the defense of Mobile Bay. The 3rd Light Battery saw action at the Battle of Spanish Fort in March and April 1865. When the Confederate Department of Alabama, Mississippi, and East Louisiana surrendered on May 4, 1865, the battery was again captured; the men of the battery were paroled on May 10, ending their military service.

== Organization ==
Beginning on October 6, 1861, men of the Missouri State Guard were recruited to join an artillery battery that was being formed near Osceola, Missouri. Many of the men who joined the battery originated from the St. Louis, Missouri area, leading to the battery's informal name of the St. Louis Artillery. The battery was equipped with three 6-pounder smoothbore cannons and joined the 7th Division of the Missouri State Guard on November 1, at Cassville, Missouri. The battery, commanded by Captain Emmett MacDonald, officially transferred from the Missouri State Guard to the Confederate States Army on January 28, 1862, while stationed in Springfield, Missouri.

== Service history ==
=== 1862 ===
==== Pea Ridge and First Corinth ====
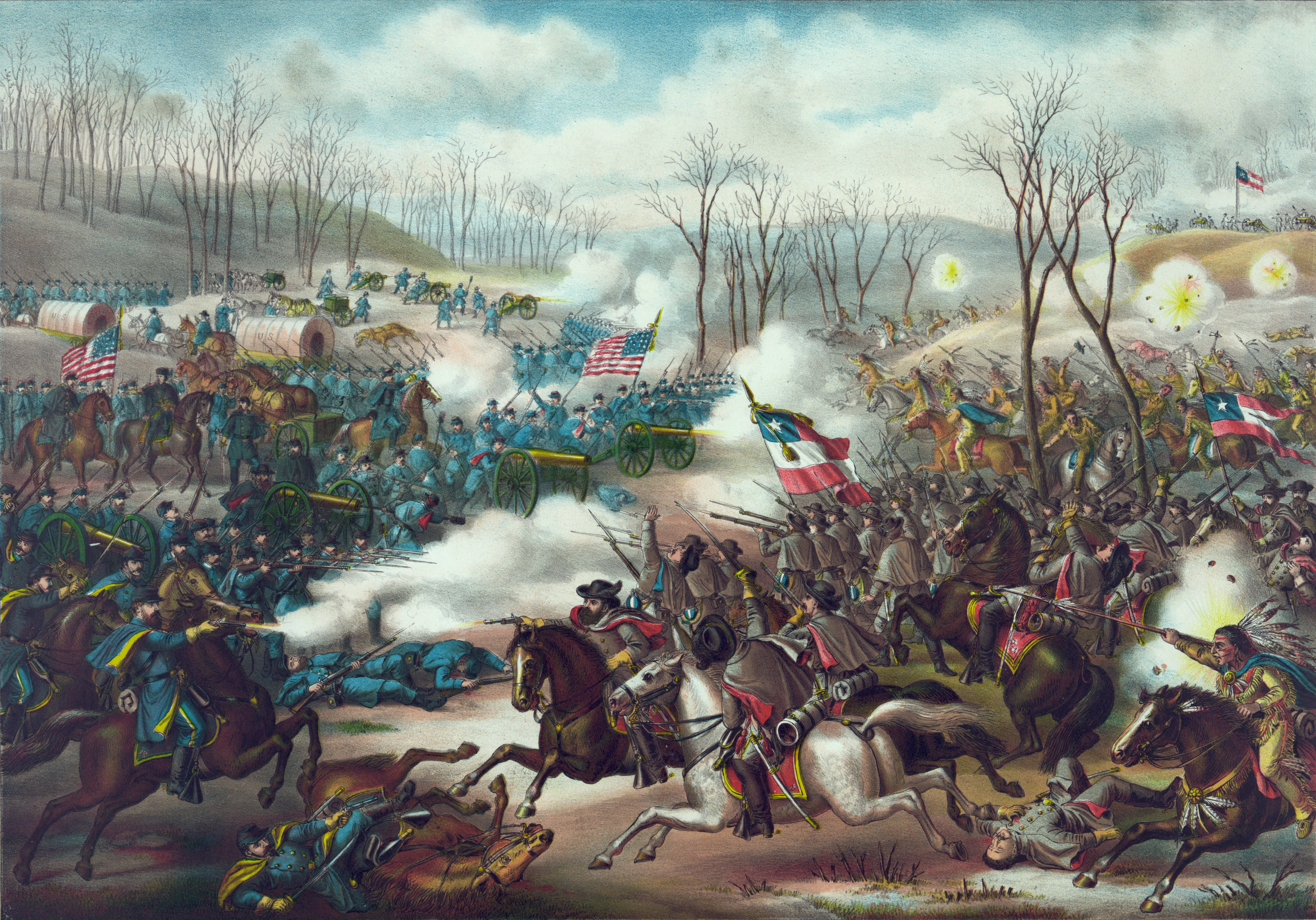
Battle of Pea Ridge

At the Battle of Pea Ridge on March 7 and 8, 1862, the battery was assigned to the command of Brigadier General Daniel M. Frost, along with Guibor's Missouri Battery and several units of the Missouri State Guard as part of the Confederate Army of the West. On the first day at Pea Ridge, the battery, along with Wade's Missouri Battery, Guibor's Battery, Clark's Missouri Battery, and a battery commanded by Lieutenant Charles W. Higgins, participated in an artillery duel with the 1st Iowa Battery. Later that day, the battery, as well as Clark's Battery and Higgin's Battery, provided artillery support for a charge made by elements of the Missouri State Guard. The fire from the batteries was described by a Union soldier as a "most terrific cannonading", but the infantry charge failed. When a Union counterattack broke the Confederate line on March 8, the 3rd Light Battery provided covering fire for the Confederate retreat before falling back as well. The battery's flag was almost left on the field, but MacDonald retrieved it before Union soldiers could capture it. After barely avoiding pursuing Union troops, the battery escaped with the rest of the Army of the West. At Pea Ridge, the battery suffered at least two casualties (Note: Two men in the battery were killed, but the number of wounded men is unknown.) and fired around seven hundred rounds of ammunition. After Pea Ridge, the battery was assigned another cannon, a 6-pounder captured from Union forces during the battle.

After Pea Ridge, the battery was transferred across the Mississippi River to Memphis, Tennessee, and later moved to Corinth, Mississippi. A muster was conducted at the latter location on May 5; the battery's strength at that time was 100 men. As part of Colonel Louis Hébert's brigade, the battery was engaged during early stages of the Siege of Corinth, and saw action at the Battle of Farmington on May 9. After the evacuation of Corinth, the battery was assigned to various points in northern Mississippi. MacDonald was assigned to the Trans-Mississippi Department to lead cavalry; an election held by the battery elevated William Dawson to battery command on September 10.

==== Iuka and Second Corinth ====
At the Battle of Iuka on September 19, the battery was assigned to Hébert's brigade of Brigadier General Lewis Henry Little's division, which was part of Major General Sterling Price's Army of the West. The battery came under enemy fire at Iuka, suffering one casualty, although it did not have the opportunity to fire its cannons. At the Second Battle of Corinth on October 3 and 4, the battery was in the brigade of Colonel W. Bruce Colbert; Hébert had been elevated to division command to replace Little, who had been killed at Iuka. A portion of the battery saw light duty at Corinth. On October 5, the battery was engaged at the Battle of Davis Bridge, fending off a Union pursuit as the Confederates retreated from Corinth. The 3rd Missouri Light Battery was positioned in the middle of the Confederate line and attracted heavy Union artillery fire. The battery fired in response, but eventually ran out of ammunition. When a Union infantry charge broke the Confederate line, the battery was unable to withdraw some of their pieces, losing either three or one cannon to capture. After Davis Bridge, the battery was transferred to Holly Springs, Mississippi and then Grenada, Mississippi.

=== 1863 ===
At the Battle of Grand Gulf on April 29, 1863, the battery was stationed at a point 4 miles (6.4 km) away from Fort Wade on the Big Black River. At the Battle of Champion Hill on May 16, the battery was in the brigade of Brigadier General Martin E. Green. After fighting at Champion Hill, the battery lost its cannons at the Battle of Big Black River Bridge on May 17; after which it entered the defenses of Vicksburg, Mississippi. The battery was present during the Siege of Vicksburg and was captured when the Confederate garrison surrendered on July 4. The 64 surviving men of the battery were paroled and exchanged and reported to Demopolis, Alabama. On October 3, the 3rd Missouri Light Battery was consolidated with the Jackson Missouri Battery and assigned to Brigadier General John C. Moore's brigade. The combined battery was generally treated as a continuation of the 3rd Light Battery. At the Battle of Missionary Ridge on November 25, the battery was available, but did not see action; replacement cannons for those lost at Big Black River Bridge had not yet arrived. After Missionary Ridge, the battery was stationed at Meridian, Mississippi and then Mobile, Alabama.

=== 1864–1865 ===
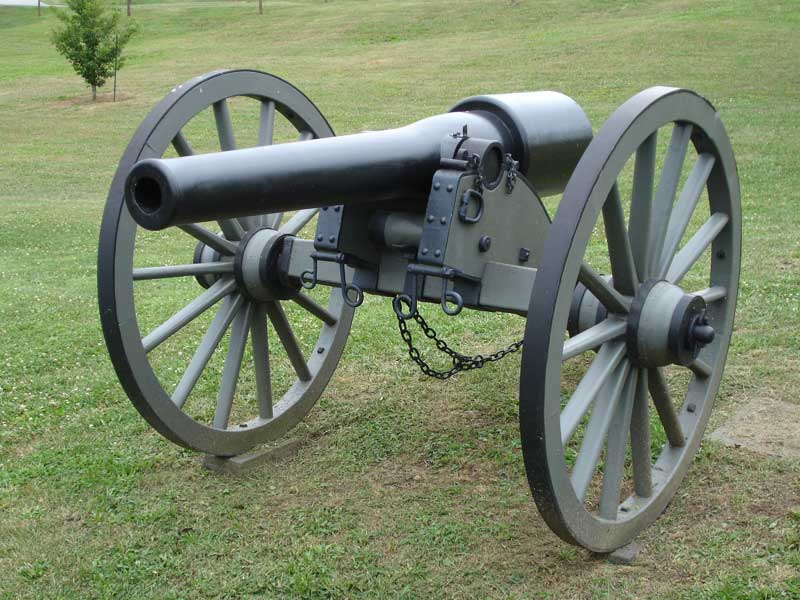
20-pounder Parrott rifle, similar to those used by the 3rd Missouri Light Battery

In February 1864, the battery received replacement cannons in the form of four 20-pounder Parrott rifles. For much of the rest of 1864, the battery guarded a portion of Mobile Bay, at one point firing at a Union Navy gunboat. Captain Dawson died of illness on March 26; Captain Schuyler Lowe, former commander of the Jackson Missouri Battery, replaced Dawson. In March and April 1865, the battery fought at the Battle of Spanish Fort. During the Mobile Campaign, the 3rd Light Battery fired an estimated 700 shots. After the Confederate forces left Mobile, the battery was sent to Meridian, Mississippi, where it remained until Lieutenant General Richard Taylor surrendered the Confederate Department of Alabama, Mississippi, and East Louisiana on May 4, 1865. The men of the battery were paroled on May 10.

== See also ==
- List of Missouri Confederate Civil War units

== Sources ==
- Cozzens, Peter (1997). The Darkest Days of the War: The Battles of Iuka and Corinth. Chapel Hill, North Carolina: University of North Carolina Press. ISBN 0-8078-2320-1.
- Gottschalk, Phil (1991). In Deadly Earnest: The Missouri Brigade. Columbia, Missouri: Missouri River Press. ISBN 0-9631136-1-5.
- Kennedy, Frances H. (1998). The Civil War Battlefield Guide (2nd ed.). Boston/New York: Houghton Mifflin. ISBN 978-0-395-74012-5.
- McGhee, James E. (2008). Guide to Missouri Confederate Regiments, 1861–1865. Fayetteville, Arkansas: University of Arkansas Press. ISBN 978-1-55728-870-7.
- Shea, William L.; Hess, Earl J. (1992). Pea Ridge: Civil War Campaign in the West. Chapel Hill, North Carolina: University of North Carolina Press. ISBN 0-8078-4669-4.
- Smith, Timothy B. (2012). Champion Hill: Decisive Battle for Vicksburg (1st paperback ed.). El Dorado Hills, California: Savas Beatie. ISBN 978-1-932714-19-7.
