= Battle of Dug Springs =

US Civil War battle

- Part of the Trans-Mississippi Theater of the American Civil War
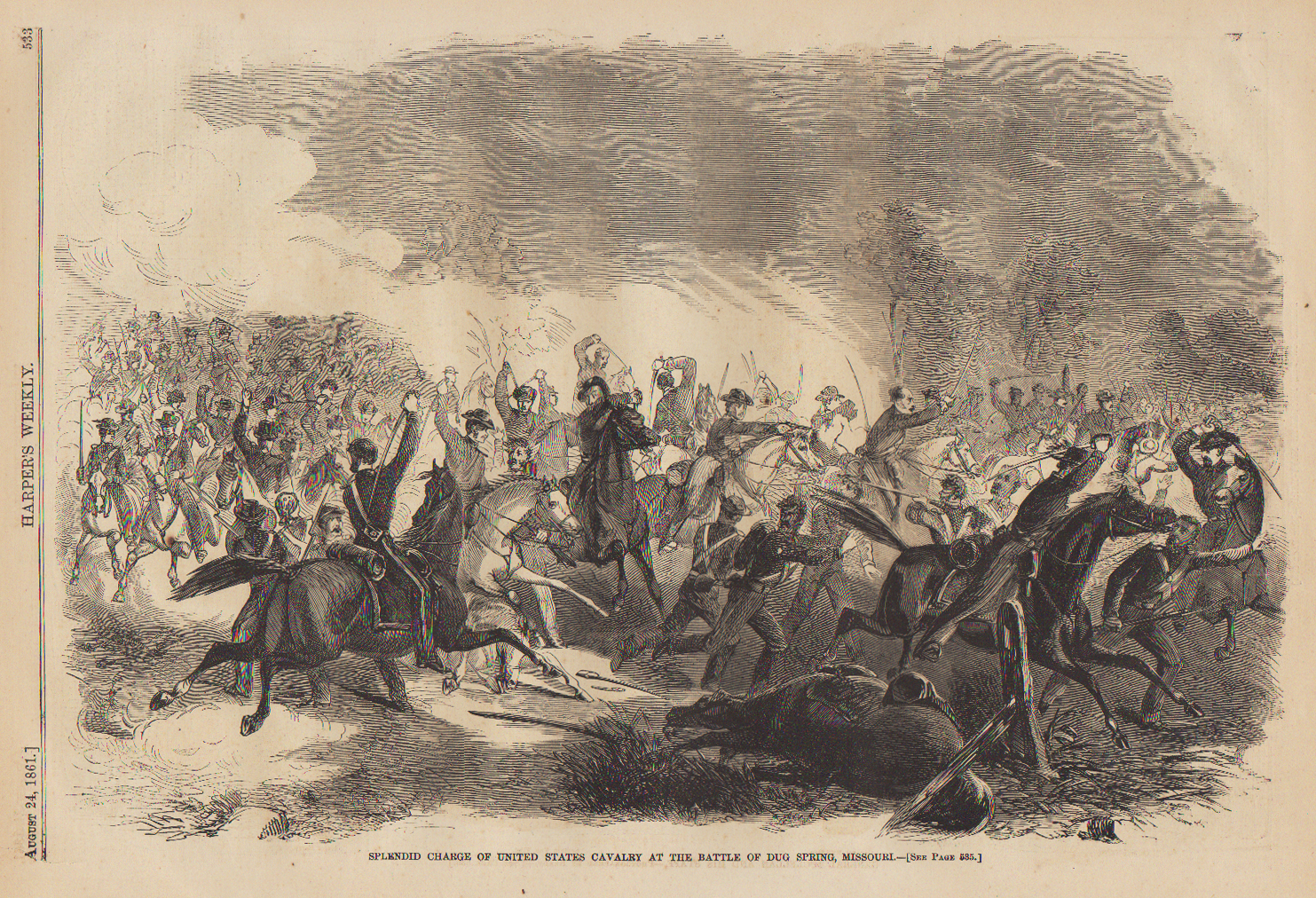
- Splendid Charge of Union Cavalry at the Battle of Dug Spring, Missouri
Date	August 2, 1861
Location	Dug Springs, near Clever, Missouri
Result	Union victory

Belligerents
United States	Missouri (Confederate); Confederate States

Commanders and leaders
(United States) Capt. Frederick Steele (United States) Capt. David S. Stanley (United States) Capt. James Totten (United States) Lt. Lathrop	Brig. Gen. James S. Rains; Capt. Americus V. Reiff

Casualties and losses
38 (8 killed 30 wounded)	84 (40 killed 44 wounded)

The Battle of Dug Springs, also known as the Rains Scare, was a part of the Trans-Mississippi Theater of the American Civil War. It was fought on August 2, 1861, near Clever, Missouri.

The battle was fought between several Union companies under the command of Nathaniel Lyon and Missouri State Guardsmen, supported by Confederate Regulars. The Union forces were led by Capt. Frederick Steele, the Fourth artillery under Lieutenant Lathrop, and a company of cavalry under Captain Stanley, and finally Totten's battery, with two pieces from Sigel's brigade. The Missouri forces were led by Brig. Gen. James S. Rains, and the Confederate support was made up of men from the 17th Arkansas Infantry Regiment, commanded by Capt. Americus V. Reiff.

Future Congressman Jordan E. Cravens fought with Capt. Reiff's company.

== Battle ==
News reached Brigadier General Nathaniel Lyon on August 1 that the Confederates were advancing on his force, in three columns, numbering 12,000 men. He immediately led his 5,800 soldiers out of Springfield, where they had been encamped. Lyon's force reached Dug Springs on August 2. Confederate pickets encountered Lyon's advance force made up of four companies. The Southerners quickly retreated before Union artillery could be fired at them, and rejoined an advance force led by Capt. Americus V. Reiff. Reiff's force of 120 men began to skirmish with Federal forces. Brigadier General Rains was encamped just south of Dug Springs, with a 400-man advance guard. Around 5pm, Rains started advancing his troops toward Dug Springs, and started fighting on the opposite side of the road from Reiff. The Federal troops held firm, so Reiff sent an aide to Rains to coordinate an assault on the Federals. Reiff advanced his men, and the Federals began to retreat. At the same time, a portion of Company C, 1st U.S. Cavalry charged Reiff. The cavalry broke through Reiff's command. Reiff later recalled "the most gallant act I saw during the war" about the charge. Federal artillery began again, causing the Missouri State Guardsmen and Confederate Regulars to flee, which resulted in a Union victory.

The battle served as an important milestone culminating in the Battle of Wilson's Creek.

== See also ==
- Missouri in the American Civil War
- Troop engagements of the American Civil War, 1861
