= 1878 Texas lieutenant gubernatorial election =

- November 5, 1878
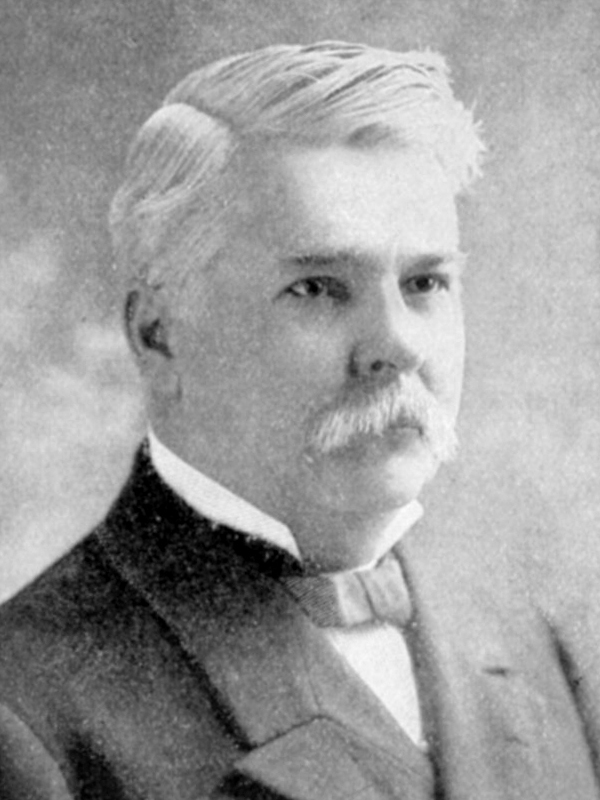

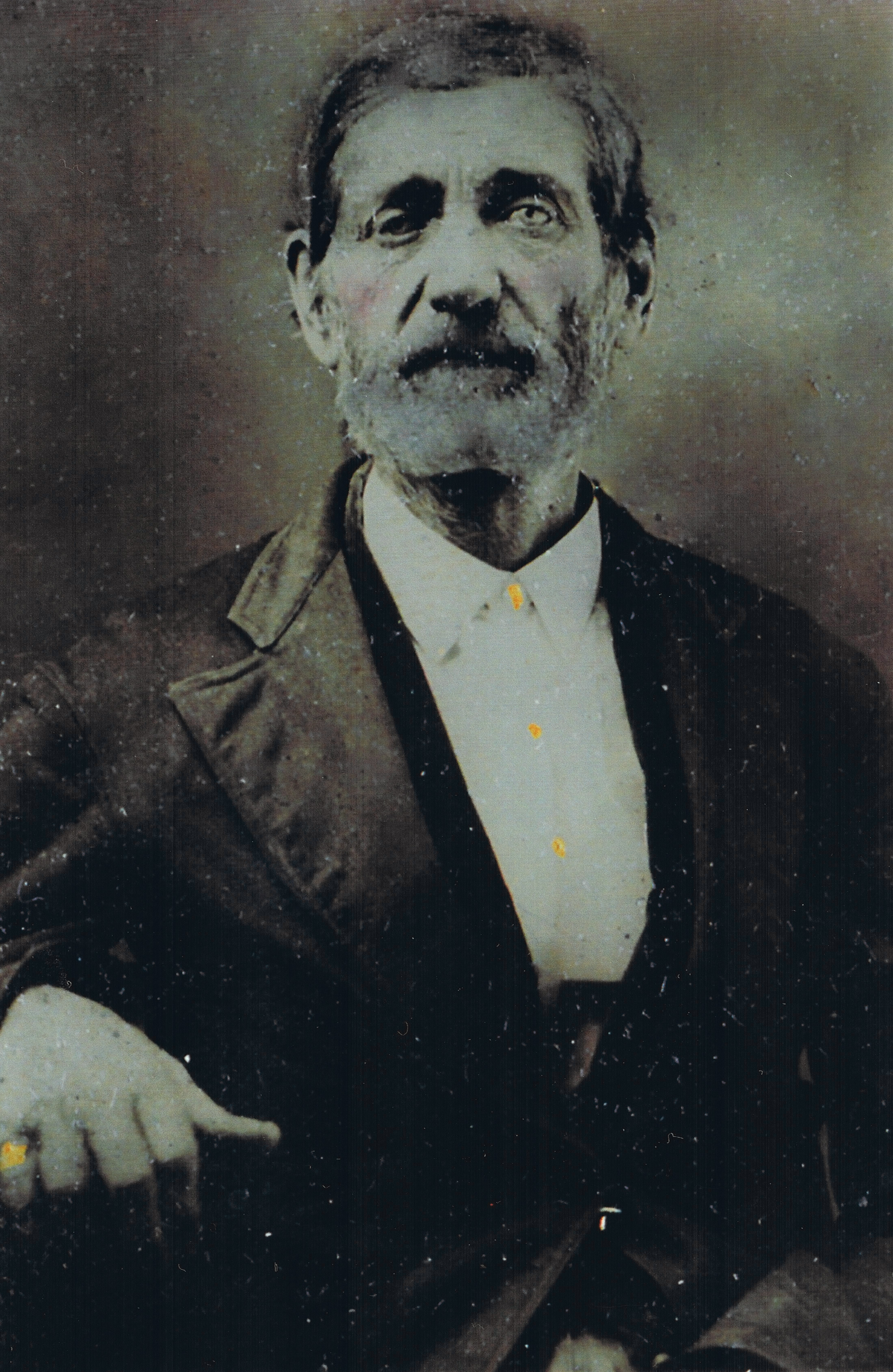

Nominee	Joseph D. Sayers	James S. Rains	Richard Allen
Party	Democratic	Greenback	Republican
Popular vote	158,850	50,388	23,001
Percentage	68.28%	21.66%	9.89%
Lieutenant Governor before election
Vacant
Democratic
Elected Lieutenant Governor
Joseph D. Sayers
Democratic

The 1878 Texas lieutenant gubernatorial election was held on November 5, 1878, in order to elect the lieutenant governor of Texas. Democratic nominee and former state senator Joseph D. Sayers defeated Greenback nominee and former Confederate General James S. Rains and Republican nominee and former state representative Richard Allen. Allen, a formerly enslaved person, was the first African American to run for statewide office in the state of Texas.

== General election ==
The previous lieutenant governor, Richard B. Hubbard had ascended to the governorship following the resignation of Richard Coke, who left the office to become U. S. Senator in 1876. This shuffling of the executive had left the office vacant since December 1876 with no incumbent to run in the race.

The newly formed Greenback Party, a populist agrarian party focused on monetary issues, ran their first ticket for state offices and nominated James Rains to be their nominee for lieutenant governor.

The leadership of the state Republican Party initially contemplated supporting the Greenback ticket instead of running their own slate of candidates and splitting the opposition vote, but a convention was held and a full ticket nominated.

The national questions of protective tariffs, the monetary questions of silver and greenbacks, and immigration were the focus of the campaigns.

Following the end of Reconstruction in the South, the Democratic party became the dominant political party in the state. On election day, November 5, 1878, Democratic nominee Joseph D. Sayers won the election handedly. Sayers was sworn in as the 12th lieutenant governor of Texas on January 21, 1879.

=== Candidates ===
- Joseph D. Sayers, chairman of the Texas State Democratic Executive Committee, former state senator from the 26th district (Democrat)
- James S. Rains, civil war veteran (Greenback)
- Richard Allen, former state representative from the 14th district (Republican)

=== Results ===
Texas lieutenant gubernatorial election, 1878
Party	Candidate	Votes	%	±%
Democratic	Joseph D. Sayers	158,850	68.28	▼7.29
Greenback	James S. Rains	50,388	21.66	N/A
Republican	Richard Allen	23,001	9.89	▼14.54
Write-in		408	0.18	N/A
Total votes		232,647	100.00	
Democratic hold				
