= Richard Allen (Texas politician) =

American politician (1830–1909)

Texas State Representative for District 14 (Harris County)
- In office February 8, 1870 – March 22, 1873
- Succeeded by: Gustave Cook

Personal details
- Born: June 10, 1830 Richmond, Virginia, US
- Died: May 16, 1909 (aged 78) Houston, Texas, US
- Resting place: Houston, Texas, US
- Party: Republican
- Spouse: Nancy Allen
- Children: 5
- Occupation: Businessman, carpenter, contractor, politician

Richard Allen (June 10, 1830 – May 16, 1909) was an American carpenter, contractor, businessman and, after the Civil War, a Republican politician in Texas. He was elected to two terms in the Texas House of Representatives. In 1878, he was the first African American in Texas to run for statewide office, but was unsuccessful in his campaign for Lieutenant Governor of Texas.

== Early life ==
Richard Allen was born into slavery on June 10, 1830, in Richmond, Virginia. Allen was taken to Texas as a child when his enslaver migrated there in 1837. While still enslaved, Allen gained a reputation as a skilled carpenter.

== Career ==
After emancipation following the American Civil War, Allen went into business as a contractor. He built a mansion for Joseph R. Morris, Mayor of Houston. He also built one of the first bridges across Buffalo Bayou.

Allen first entered public service in 1867, elected councilman in the Texas House of Councils while working as an agent for the Freedmen's Bureau, a federal organization created to assist emancipated slaves.

He joined the Republican Party. In 1868, he won a seat to represent Harris and Montgomery counties in the Texas Legislature, serving in the Twelfth Legislature in 1869. He was re-elected to the Thirteenth Texas Legislature, but the election was contested. The increasingly Democratic-dominated legislature seated his Democratic opponent, Gustave Cook, instead. Allen worked to improve public education and to establish state pensions for Civil War veterans. He served on the Texas House Roads and Bridges Committee.

In 1870, Allen entered the race for the United States House of Representatives from his district, but withdrew his candidacy during the early part of the Republican nominating process.

In his business life, that year Allen co-founded the Bayou City Bank in Houston. In 1872 he won a street paving contract with the City of Houston.

Allen co-founded Houston's Emancipation Park in 1872.

In 1878, Allen unsuccessfully ran for lieutenant governor; he was the first African American in Texas to run as a candidate for a statewide office. After leaving the legislature, he continued to be active in the Republican Party. He attended state and national conventions as a delegate until 1896 (for more than two and a half decades).

From 1881 to 1882, Allen was quartermaster for the Black regiment of Texas militia. Between 1882 and 1885 he was a storekeeper and inspector and deputy collector of United States customs at Houston during a Republican presidential administration.

== Personal life ==
Allen was born into slavery in Richmond, Virginia. He was brought to Harris County, Texas in 1837 where he remained enslaved until emancipation in 1865. Allen was a skilled carpenter and is credited with designing and building the home of Houston's mayor, Joseph R. Morris. Upon emancipation, he worked as a contractor and bridge builder.

Allen married and had five children. His daughter V. Nora Allen married businessman and real estate investor John Brown Bell in 1900. He was a Baptist, and was active in his church and in local community organizations.

== Death ==
Upon his death on May 16, 1909, in Houston, Allen was interred at the Olivewood Cemetery in Houston.

== See also ==
- History of the African Americans in Houston
- African American officeholders from the end of the Civil War until before 1900
