= Gustave Cook =

American politician and judge

Gustave Cook (1835–1897) was an American politician and judge.

Born on 3 July 1835 in Lowndes County, Alabama, to parents Nathaniel and Harriet Anthony (Herbert) Cook, Gustave Cook moved to Texas in 1850. While employed at a pharmacy, he studied law under John B. Jones. After his admittance to the bar, Cook served as district court clerk in Fort Bend County and was county judge between 1856 and 1858. During the American Civil War, Cook served with Terry's Texas Rangers and attained the rank of colonel.

In 1870, Cook settled in Houston. He contested the 1872 Texas legislative election, and was awarded the seat held by Richard Allen. Cook was affiliated with the Democratic Party and represented district 14 of the Texas House of Representatives from 22 March 1873 to 13 January 1874. Later that year, Cook was appointed to a criminal court judgeship representing Harris and Galveston County, Texas. He resigned the judgeship on 1 October 1888. Cook attended the Philadelphia Peace Convention of 1866 to represent Texas, and ten years later, served as a delegate to the Democratic Party's state convention, held in the city of Galveston. From 1887, he actively opposed prohibition-related measures. Cooke supported the 1888 reelection campaign of Roger Q. Mills, and subsequently sought the Democratic gubernatorial nomination in 1890. The party's eventual nominee, Jim Hogg, won the governorship. Cooke moved to San Marcos in 1892, and died there in July 1897.
