= Dry Wood Creek =

Stream in the American state of Missouri

Coordinates: 37°50′48″N 94°29′08″W

Dry Wood Creek is a stream in Bourbon County, Kansas and Vernon County, Missouri. It is a tributary of the Marmaton River. The confluence is approximately 1.5 miles northeast of Deerfield.

Dry Wood Creek was named for the dried-out wood that burned there during a period of drought, according to local history.

The Battle of Dry Wood Creek was fought on the Missouri side in 1861.

== See also ==
- List of rivers of Kansas
- List of rivers of Missouri
