= Deerfield, Missouri =

- Village
- Location of Deerfield, Missouri
- Coordinates: 37°50′19″N 94°30′28″W
- Country: United States
- State: Missouri
- County: Vernon
- Incorporated: 1963

Area
  - Total: 0.10 sq mi (0.26 km^{2})
  - Land: 0.10 sq mi (0.26 km^{2})
  - Water: 0 sq mi (0.00 km^{2})
- Elevation: 787 ft (240 m)

Population (2020)
  - Total: 40
  - Density: 393.1/sq mi (151.76/km^{2})
- Time zone: UTC-6 (Central (CST))
  - Summer (DST): UTC-5 (CDT)
- ZIP code: 64741
- Area code: 417
- FIPS code: 29-18802
- GNIS feature ID: 2398707

Deerfield is a village in Vernon County, Missouri, United States. The population was 40 at the 2020 census.

== History ==
Deerfield was first settled in the 1830s. The town site was platted in 1871, taking its name from Deerfield Township. A post office called Deerfield has been in operation since 1856.

== Geography ==
Deerfield is located on US Route 54 approximately seven miles west of Nevada. The Marmaton River flows past along the north side of Route 54 and Dry Wood Creek flows past the east side of the town to enter the Marmaton approximately one mile northeast.

According to the United States Census Bureau, the village has a total area of 0.10 square miles (0.26 km^{2}), all land.

== Demographics ==
Historical population
| Census | Pop. | Note | %± |
|---|---|---|---|
| 1890 | 239 | | — |
| 1900 | 222 | | −7.1% |
| 1910 | 129 | | −41.9% |
| 1920 | 238 | | 84.5% |
| 1930 | 165 | | −30.7% |
| 1940 | 187 | | 13.3% |
| 1950 | 138 | | −26.2% |
| 1960 | 122 | | −11.6% |
| 1970 | 112 | | −8.2% |
| 1980 | 95 | | −15.2% |
| 1990 | 85 | | −10.5% |
| 2000 | 75 | | −11.8% |
| 2010 | 81 | | 8.0% |
| 2020 | 40 | | −50.6% |
U.S. Decennial Census

=== 2010 census ===
As of the census of 2010, there were 81 people, 33 households, and 24 families living in the village. The population density was 810.0 inhabitants per square mile (312.7/km^{2}). There were 34 housing units at an average density of 340.0 per square mile (131.3/km^{2}). The racial makeup of the village was 95.1% White, 1.2% Native American, 1.2% Asian, and 2.5% from two or more races.

There were 33 households, of which 36.4% had children under the age of 18 living with them, 66.7% were married couples living together, 6.1% had a male householder with no wife present, and 27.3% were non-families. 21.2% of all households were made up of individuals, and 9.1% had someone living alone who was 65 years of age or older. The average household size was 2.45 and the average family size was 2.88.

The median age in the village was 39.6 years. 23.5% of residents were under the age of 18; 9.8% were between the ages of 18 and 24; 23.3% were from 25 to 44; 28.4% were from 45 to 64; and 14.8% were 65 years of age or older. The gender makeup of the village was 53.1% male and 46.9% female.

=== 2000 census ===
As of the census of 2000, there were 75 people, 33 households, and 19 families living in the village. The population density was 727.6 inhabitants per square mile (280.9/km^{2}). There were 38 housing units at an average density of 368.7 per square mile (142.4/km^{2}). All residents were White. 1.33% of the population were Hispanic or Latino.

There were 33 households, out of which 27.3% had children under the age of 18 living with them, 48.5% were married couples living together, 9.1% had a female householder with no husband present, and 42.4% were non-families. 39.4% of all households were made up of individuals, and 30.3% had someone living alone who was 65 years of age or older. The average household size was 2.27 and the average family size was 3.11.

In the village, the population was spread out, with 24.0% under the age of 18, 10.7% from 18 to 24, 26.7% from 25 to 44, 20.0% from 45 to 64, and 18.7% who were 65 years of age or older. The median age was 36 years. For every 100 females, there were 97.4 males. For every 100 females age 18 and over, there were 90.0 males.

The median income for a household in the village was $26,667, and the median income for a family was $31,667. Males had a median income of $18,542 versus $23,750 for females. The per capita income for the village was $11,065. There were no families and 9.3% of the population living below the poverty line, including 15.0% of under eighteens and 35.7% of those over 64.
