= 1st Iowa Independent Battery Light Artillery =

1st Iowa Light Artillery Battery
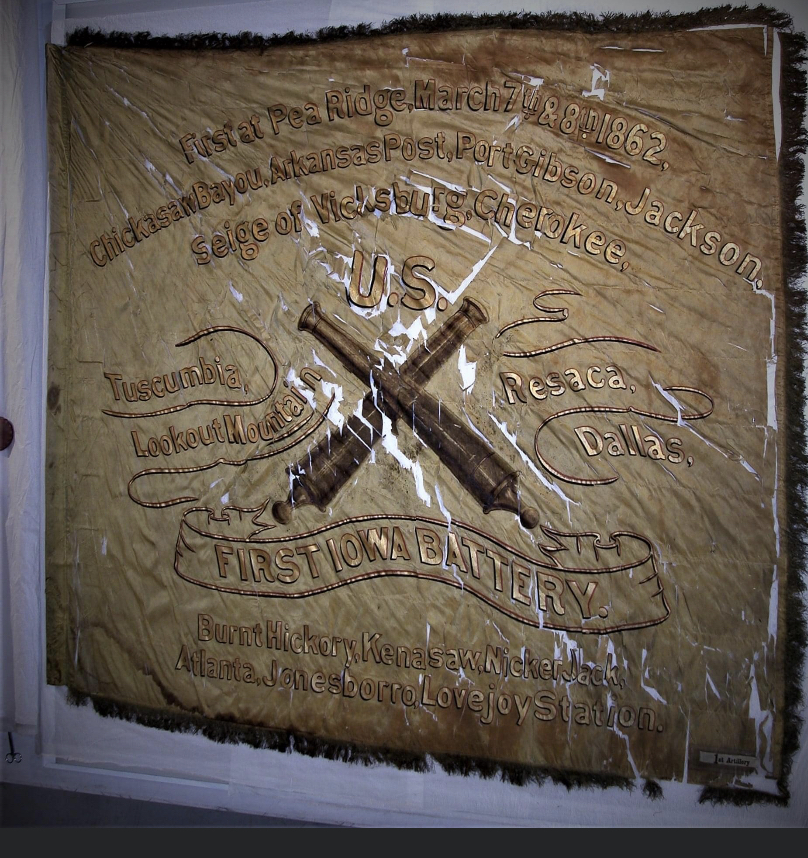
- 1st Iowa Light Artillery Battery flag
- Active: August 17, 1861 – July 5, 1865
- Disbanded: July 5, 1865
- Country: United States
- Allegiance: Union
- Branch: Artillery
- Size: Battery
- Engagements: American Civil War: Battle of Pea Ridge; Siege of Vicksburg; Battle of Lookout Mountain; Battle of Missionary Ridge; Battle of Resaca; Battle of Kennesaw Mountain; Battle of Atlanta; Battle of Nashville

Commanders
- Captain: Charles H. Fletcher; Junius A. Jones; Henry H. Griffiths; William H. Gay
- 1st Lieutenant: Virgil J. David; Orrin W. Gambell; Thomas A. Ijams; James W. Williams

The 1st Iowa Light Artillery Battery was a light artillery battery from Iowa that served in the Union Army between August 17, 1861, and July 5, 1865, during the American Civil War.

== Service ==
The 1st Iowa Light Artillery was mustered into Federal service at Burlington, Iowa for a three-year enlistment on August 17, 1861. The regiment was mustered out of Federal service on July 5, 1865.

== Total strength and casualties ==
A total of 266 men served in the 1st Iowa Battery at one time or another during its existence. It suffered 10 enlisted men who were killed in action or who died of their wounds and 1 officer and 50 enlisted men who died of disease, for a total of 61 fatalities#

== Bibliography ==
- The Civil War Archive
