= Battle of Carthage, Missouri =

Battle of the American Civil War

Battle of Carthage
- Part of the Trans-Mississippi Theater of the American Civil War
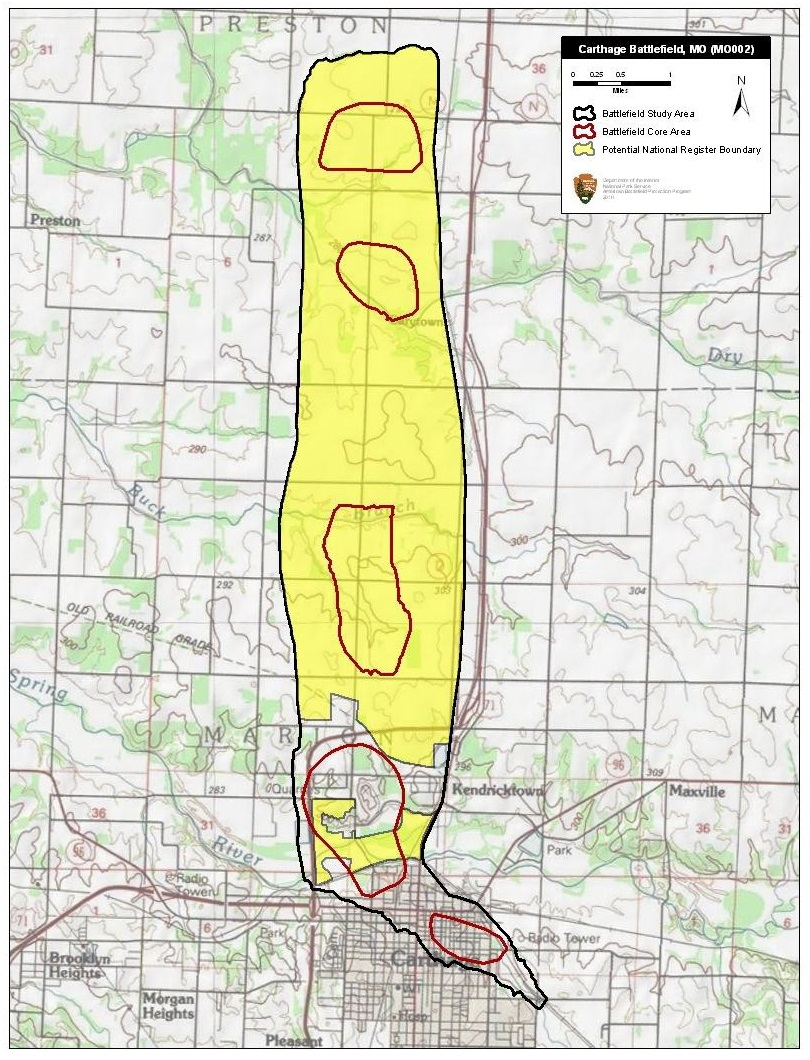
- Carthage Battlefield
Date	July 5, 1861
Location	Carthage, Missouri 37°11′42″N 94°19′39″W
Result	Confederate victory

Belligerents
Missouri (Confederate)	United States

Commanders and leaders
Claiborne F. Jackson	(United States) Col. Franz Sigel

Units involved
Missouri State Guard	3rd Missouri Infantry Regiment 5th Missouri Infantry Regiment

Strength
4,000 armed 2,000 unarmed	1,100

Casualties and losses
200	44

The Battle of Carthage, also known as the Engagement near Carthage, took place at the beginning of the American Civil War on July 5, 1861, near Carthage, Missouri. The experienced Colonel Franz Sigel commanded 1,100 Federal soldiers intent on keeping Missouri within the Union. The Missouri State Guard was commanded by Governor Claiborne F. Jackson himself and numbered over 4,000 soldiers led by a hero of Mexico, Sterling Price, along with 2,000 unarmed troops who did not participate in the battle.

== Background ==
Political views in Missouri were divided before the American Civil War. St. Louis and its surrounding counties generally sympathized with the Northern states because that region was connected economically with the North. The area also had few slaves and contained a large German immigrant population, most of whom opposed slavery. Missouri Governor Claiborne F. Jackson was pro-Southern, and the rest of the state was very heavily divided. Publicly Jackson tried to stay neutral, but he was suspected by the Union men of secretly preparing the state militia to seize the Federal Arsenal in St. Louis.

In April 1861, after the firing on Fort Sumter, President Abraham Lincoln called for troops from all of the states to defeat the Confederacy. Missouri was asked to send four regiments. Governor Jackson refused the request. Instead, he called up the Missouri State Militia, possibly to seize the St. Louis Arsenal. If this was his intention, it was thwarted by the newly appointed commander of the arsenal, Captain Nathaniel Lyon of the 2nd U. S. Infantry.

Lyon had previously been stationed in Kansas Territory and had developed well-known abolitionist views. Arriving in February 1861, Lyon quickly became associated with the "Unconditional Unionist" faction in St. Louis. Lyon, like many St. Louis Unionists, feared that Governor Jackson would employ the city's secessionist Minutemen paramilitary organization and the local Missouri Volunteer Militia to capture the Arsenal.

Beginning on April 22, 1861, on the orders of President Lincoln, Lyon mustered in four regiments of Federal Missouri Volunteers (mostly former members of Republican Wide Awake marching clubs), issuing them weapons drawn from the Arsenal stocks. Lincoln followed up with orders to remove most of the Arsenal's remaining weapons to Illinois, a transfer which was carried out in secret on the night of April 24–25, 1861.

The crisis grew worse when a shipment of Confederate siege artillery arrived at the state Militia encampment, Camp Jackson, on May 8–9, 1861. Presented with proof of treasonous plotting at Camp Jackson, Lyon marched the Federal regulars and his new Missouri Volunteers to the camp to arrest the militia. Surrounding the camp, Lyon forced the militia's surrender and marched the prisoners to and through St. Louis, leading to the deadly and riotous Camp Jackson Affair.

The action drew great protests from Missourians, and even representatives of the City of St. Louis petitioned Lincoln for Lyon's dismissal. However, Lyon's action was supported by most of St. Louis' Unconditional Unionists, including Congressman Francis P. Blair Jr., brother to Lincoln's Postmaster General Montgomery Blair. The Blair brothers arranged for Lyon's promotion to brigadier general. Continued Unconditional Unionist concerns over the accommodation of state authorities by Gen. William S. Harney, commander of the Department of the West, led to Harney's removal on May 31, 1861.

== Prelude ==
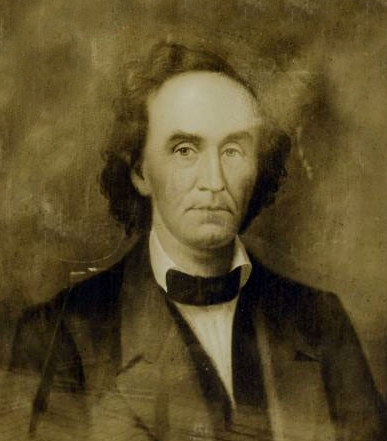
Led by Governor Jackson, the Missouri State Guard fought a strong defensive campaign and stopped the Union advance at Carthage.

On June 10, 1861, Lyon met with Governor Jackson and Missouri State Guard Major-General Sterling Price at St. Louis' Planter's House hotel in a last attempt to solve conflicting claims for state and federal sovereignty. The conference proved futile, with both parties making mutually unacceptable demands. After four hours, Lyon abruptly ended the meeting, and Jackson and Price retreated to Jefferson City, ordering railroad bridges burned behind them.

Lyon moved elements of his St. Louis garrison up the Missouri River by steamer to capture the state capital at Jefferson City. Colonel Franz Sigel took command of a second element of Federal troops moving from St. Louis into southwest Missouri to cut off Missouri State Guard forces who might retreat south in the face of Lyon's advance. On June 12 he started to move his First and Second Battalions, along with five infantry companies, two rifle companies, and an artillery battery towards Springfield.

The Missouri State Guard in Jefferson City retreated to Boonville, where a pivotal skirmish took place on June 17. Lyon quickly took the town and chased the Missouri State Guard south. Due to logistical difficulties, Lyon could not keep up with the retreating Guardsmen. Another group of State Guardsmen in Lexington also moved south under Sterling Price, after learning of the defeat at Boonville. Sigel's troops arrived in Springfield and quickly took the town. They prepared to march to Carthage, hoping to catch up with the retreating State Guardsmen.

Jackson's and Price's units met in Lamar on July 3 and started to organize. Jackson's army grew to 6,000 men, a large number of whom joined along the march south. However, the force in Lamar was, for the most part, armed only with hunting rifles, shotguns, knives or, in some cases, no weapons at all. The next day, July 4, Sigel arrived at Carthage with 1,100 men. By July 4, Sigel had intelligence that the Missouri State Guard was camped near Lamar, about 18 miles north of Carthage. On the night of July 4, State Guard skirmishers collided with Sigel's pickets outside of Carthage. So both sides were aware of each other’s presence.

== Battle ==
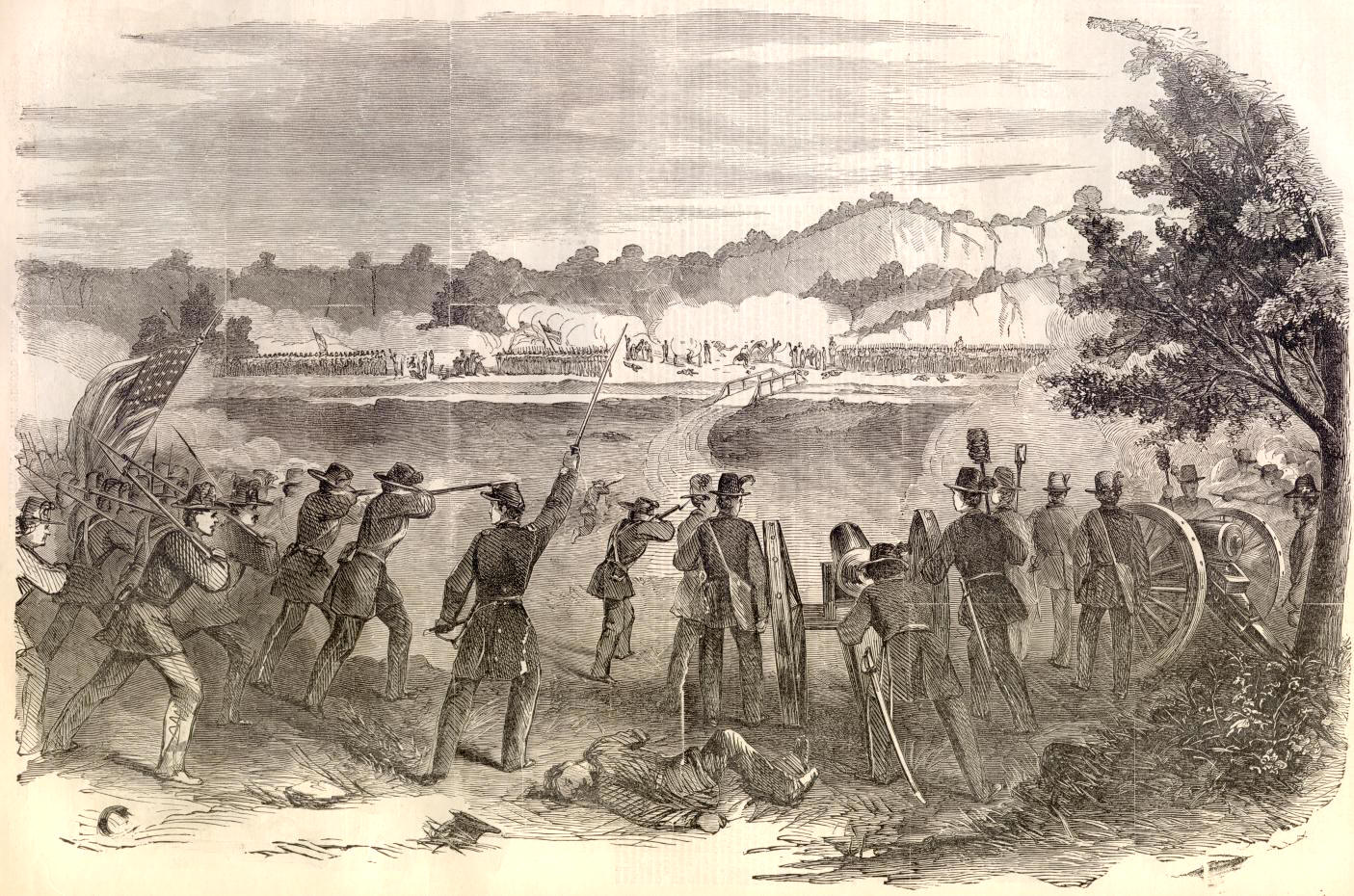
The battle as depicted in Harper's Weekly

Learning that Sigel had encamped at Carthage, Governor Jackson took command and made plans to attack the smaller but better armed Union force. On the morning of July 5, Jackson marched his green soldiers south. The rival armies met 10 miles north of Carthage, and the State Guard raised two Confederate stars and bars flags on either side of their line, which stretched over half a mile. Sigel's men provided an impressive display as they formed a line of battle and moved within 800 yards of the State Guard troops.

Opening the action with his artillery, Sigel closed to the attack. Jackson replied with his own artillery. Jackson and the State Guard then chased after Sigel's brigade, engaging them in battle as they pushed them 10 miles southward until they reached the outskirts of Carthage. Jackson had his men divide up and attempt to surround Sigel's force; the battle went on steadily through the day until both forces faced off in the Carthage town square. Both sides then engaged in some skirmishing. At this point, Sigel learned of a large body of Guardsmen—actually all unarmed recruits—moving into the woods on his left outside of town. Fearing this force would turn his flank, he ordered a retreat. The State Guard pursued, but Sigel conducted a successful rearguard action. By evening, Sigel was back in Carthage. Under cover of darkness, he retreated further to Sarcoxie.

== Aftermath ==
The battle was a strategic victory by the Missouri State Guard in large part owing to new tactics introduced on the battlefield by independent partisan rangers serving with Captain Jo Shelby. Carthage played a part in determining Missouri's course during the war, as it helped spark recruitment for the Southern regiments. A founder of the county who fought in the battle and was then elected Lieutenant Colonel of the 13th Missouri Cavalry Regiment and 5th Missouri Infantry, attorney Robert Wells Crawford, served as a recruiter for the Confederate States Army in Missouri, a post he was nominated for by Waldo P. Johnson, formerly a United States Senator from Missouri in a letter to Missouri governor-in-exile Jackson dated October 24, 1862.

== Significance ==
Chronologically the first major battle after Lincoln invoked "the war power" in lieu of a Declaration of War in his Message to Congress on July 4, 1861, the Battle of Carthage was strategically and tactically significant. The battle marks the only time a sitting U.S. State governor has led troops in the field, and then, against the Union to which his state belonged. Serving at the vanguard of Governor Jackson's army, a band of 150 independent partisan rangers were under the command of Captain Jo Shelby, a Missouri farmer. From tactical battlefield maneuvers under fire by Sigel's batteries to pressing his retreat to Sarcoxie, Shelby's rangers "snatched the victory at Carthage from Sigel's grasp", and pro-Confederate elements in Missouri celebrated their first victory. The depopulation of mineral-rich Jasper County and the destruction of Carthage by sustained hostilities throughout the war paved the way for Victorian-era resettlement.

== Battlefield preservation ==
The American Battlefield Trust and its partners in battlefield land preservation have acquired and preserved 181 acres (0.73 km^{2}) of the Carthage battlefield through mid-2023.
