= Provisional Government of Missouri =

Interim government of Missouri during the American Civil War

The Provisional Government of Missouri was established on August 1, 1861 by the members of the Missouri Constitutional Convention after the evacuation of Missouri's pro-Secessionist Governor Clairborne Fox Jackson and elements of the Legislature to the southern part of the state. The Missouri State Convention, acting under authorities granted to it by the special election earlier that year, declared the office of Governor vacant, and appointed former Missouri Supreme Court Justice Hamilton Gamble Governor. Even opponents of Federal action in Missouri generally respected Gamble.

== Political ==
As the secession crisis deepened, Missouri attempted to follow a policy of armed neutrality, in which the state would not support either side in the war but remain in the Union. A special election in February established a Missouri Constitutional Convention to determine the relationship between Missouri and the United States. The convention voted against secession and affirmed the state's neutrality.

The outbreak of hostilities at Fort Sumter led to unrest in Missouri. Secessionists seized the Liberty Arsenal a week later. Governor Claiborne Jackson called up the state militia for drill in St. Louis and to receive some arms clandestinely obtained from the Confederacy. This resulted in a confrontation with the aggressive Union commander Nathaniel Lyon, who forced the surrender of the militia, in what was called the Camp Jackson Affair. After a deadly riot ensued, the Missouri legislature authorized the reorganization of the militia into the Missouri State Guard, controlled by the governor. General William Harney reached an agreement with the new Missouri State Guard commander Sterling Price, known as the Price-Harney Truce.

Lincoln appointed Lyon to replace Harney as commander of the Department of the West. During negotiations among the governor, Lyon, and Price, Lyon would not accept the governor's proposed limitations on Federal troops and volunteers. The meeting ended abruptly with Lyon declaring, "Rather than concede to the State of Missouri for one single instant the right to dictate to my government in any matter however important, I would see you, and you, and you, and you, and every man, woman, and child in the State, dead and buried! This means war. In an hour one of my officers will call on you and conduct you out of my lines." As the Missouri government fled into exile Lyon moved rapidly capturing the capitol at Jefferson City, Missouri a few days later in mid-June 1861.

The Missouri Constitutional Convention reconvened to consider the status of the state in July. The convention declared the governor's office and state legislative offices to be vacant and appointed Gamble as governor of a provisional government of Missouri on August 1. Gov. Jackson called a rump session of the exiled General Assembly in Neosho, Missouri, and in late October with a dubious quorum passed an ordinance of secession. Although secessionists considered Gamble an unelected puppet of the Union forces, he opposed harsh Union treatment of the state. For instance, he protested to President Lincoln about the Fremont Emancipation, which unilaterally freed the state's slaves in 1861 and imposed martial law. Lincoln agreed to Gamble's request to overturn this decision, rescinded the emancipation and removed John C. Fremont from command.

== Military ==
The Provisional Government of Missouri, faced a difficult task, dealing with Missouri secessionists who considered Union men traitors, and Federal troops from outside the state who tended to view all Missourians as potential rebels.

Governor Gamble convinced President Lincoln that local units composed of Missourian, controlled by the (Provisional) State Government, would be the least disruptive way to deal with Missouri Guerrillas and would free out-state Federal regiments for other combat roles. This led Lincoln to authorized the creation of the (new) Missouri State Militia, a military force with a legal status unique in U.S. history. It was paid and equipped by the Federal government, but ultimately reported the Governor of Missouri, and had a service obligation limited to Missouri, and operations related to Missouri security. To integrate the MSM with federal forces in the region Governor Gamble commissioned Major General Henry W. Halleck, the Federal commander of the Department of the Mississippi as the Major General of the Missouri State Militia.

The Missouri State Militia, and the later Enrolled Militia and Provisional Enrolled Militia, did not fully suppress guerrilla activity in the state (neither could conventional Federal troops) but did contribute significant combat power (directly and indirectly) to Federal efforts in the Trans-Mississippi Theater Trans-Mississippi Theater.

Due to its internecine nature, the Civil War in Missouri would be longer and more brutal than anywhere else in the U.S. However, the Provisional Government managed to keep the majority of Missourians from embracing secessionism, and played a vital role in holding the state for the Union.
