= Missouri secession =

Issue before and during the American Civil War

During the lead-up to the American Civil War, the proposed secession of Missouri from the Union was controversial because of the state's disputed status. The Missouri state convention voted in March 1861, by 98-1, against secession, and was a border state until abolishing slavery in January 1865. Missouri was claimed by both the Union and the Confederacy, had two rival state governments, (its Confederate state “government” in exile, operating out of northern Texas), and sent representatives to both the United States Congress and the Confederate Congress.

Despite sporadic threats from pro-Confederate irregular armies and the Confederacy controlling Southern Missouri early in the war, the Union government had established permanent control of Missouri by 1862, with the Missouri Confederate government functioning only as a government in exile for the rest of the duration of the war after being driven from the state.

== Missouri Constitutional Convention ==
In the aftermath of the 1860 election, the governor of Missouri was Claiborne Fox Jackson, a Southern sympathizer who favored secession. At his inauguration, during the so called Secession Winter Jackson had requested the authorization of a state constitutional convention to consider the relationship between Missouri and the Federal government. A special referendum approved the Missouri Constitutional Convention and delegates were elected. Contrary to Jackson's expectations, no avowed secessionist delegates were elected. In February, Jackson unsuccessfully argued for Missouri's secession before the State Constitutional Convention convened to debate the issue under the leadership of former governor Sterling Price. Most of Missouri, like Price, held "conditional Unionist" beliefs at this point, meaning they neither favored secession nor supported the United States warring against the Confederacy. They voted against secession on March 19, 1861.

== St. Louis Arsenal ==
In early February, United States Army Captain Nathaniel Lyon, was transferred to Missouri and stationed at the St. Louis Arsenal. The arsenal was under the command of Brevet Major Peter V. Hagner and supervised by Brigadier General William S. Harney, commander of the U.S. Army's Department of the West. Both men were considered moderates on the issues of slavery and sectional conflict by pro-slavery and southern sympathizer President James Buchanan's administration. Both men believed a policy of appeasement would keep Missouri in the Union, with Harney in particular having deep ties to the Missouri elite through his wife's family. Lyon on the other hand believed conflict was inevitable in Missouri, and that appeasement was a dangerous mistake. He came to this position from his experience with the violence carried out by Missouri "border-ruffians" during Bleeding Kansas.

The St. Louis Arsenal, containing one of the largest caches of military supplies in the West, was of great strategic importance to any coming conflict in the state. During the Secession Winter a number of Southern States seceded from the Union. In addition, these states began to seize Federal military instillations within their borders, taking the arms and artillery held within them. While Missouri voted not to secede, many in the state were pro-secession and Lyon feared that the Arsenal was too poorly defended to resist an attempt to take it if one was made. Seeking to increase the number of Union troops who could be called on to defend the Arsenal, in early March of 1861 Lyon began to train and help arm a Pro-Union militia in secret. This militia was mostly made up of anti-slavery German immigrants and pro-republican members of the St. Louis chapter of the Wide Awakes. Lyon was supported by Congressman Frank Blair, an ally of Abraham Lincoln, with powerful connections to the incoming president through his brother Montgomery Blair.

After Lincoln called for Union troops in preparation for the Civil War, Lyon recognized an opportunity to strengthen the Arsenal garrison by mustering the pro-Union militia into the Federal army. Up until that point, the militia had limited arms, consisting only of what they successfully smuggled into Missouri from Illinois. As of late March, however, Hagner still supervised the arsenal and Harney still commanded the Department of the West. Neither Hagner nor Harney were supportive of Lyon's plans with the militia, and Hagner denied Lyon's attempts to release the arsenal's weapons to them. After this denial Lyon began exerting pressure on the president through the politically connected Blair to have himself named the new commander of the arsenal.

Blair promptly did so and, as the Battle of Fort Sumter began almost simultaneously, orders where sent to Harney to organize Federal militia in Missouri. After failing to act on these orders, and facing criticism from Blair, Harney was ordered by War Department to return to Washington by Simon Cameron. On April 21, 1861, with Lyon's control of the arsenal now unimpeded, he armed the militia at night and ordered them to take the rest of the Arsenal's weapons up river to Illinois. He did this in response to the seizure of the smaller Liberty Arsenal by pro-secession members of the Missouri State Militia the day before. Finally, on April 23 with the pro-Union militia armed and the guns safe, Lyon formally mustered the troops into the Federal Army.

== Camp Jackson Affair ==
At the same time, Governor Claiborne Fox Jackson began conspiring with the newly declared Confederacy to have arms and artillery given to pro-Confederate forces in the Missouri State Militia. Ordering the State Militia to begin mobilizing on May 1, an encampment was established outside of St. Louis called Camp Jackson. While the Governor claimed that this was only a training exercise, on May 9, the Confederate equipment was delivered to the camp to help them take the Arsenal by force.

This action set the stage for Lyon's arrest of a Missouri State Militia encampment on May 10 after discovering the Confederate artillery. This event, known as the Camp Jackson affair sparked a pro-secession riot when the State Militia were marched through town to be held in the Arsenal. The violence that ensued allowed Governor Jackson to force through a bill that gave him near dictatorial powers, and ordered a new Missouri State Guard under command of Sterling Price. Price had been the President of the now-adjourned Missouri Constitutional Convention, and had previously resisted Jackson's call for secession. After the Camp Jackson Affair however, Price joined Jackson in secretly asking for the Confederacy to send troops to occupy Missouri.

Harney returned from Washington on May 12 and immediately attempted to negotiate a truce. On May 16, responding to requests from the mayor of St. Louis to have Lyon relieved of his post in Missouri, Attorney General Edward Bates presented two representatives of the city to President Lincoln. Frank Blair's brother and Postmaster General Montgomery Blair and War Secretary Simon Cameron intervened on Lyon's behalf, urging Lincoln to retain him. Lincoln sided with the Blairs and Cameron. A week later, Harney met with Price and drafted the Price-Harney Truce, which read:

General Price, having by commission full authority over the militia of the State of Missouri, undertakes, with the sanction of the governor of the State, already declared, to direct the whole power of the State officers to maintain order within the State among the people thereof, and General Harney publicly declares that, this object being thus assured, he can have no occasion, as he has no wish, to make military movements, which might otherwise create excitements and jealousies which he most earnestly desires to avoid.

The truce temporarily alleviated the mounting hostilities in Missouri but also left Lyon and Blair discontent. The truce restricted Federal forces to St. Louis, while allowing Jacksons new pro-confederate Missouri State Guard to move freely in the rest of the state. Blair, however, had obtained a trump card the previous month when Lincoln authorized Blair to dismiss Harney from command at Blair's discretion. Blair did so on May 30, ensuring the promotion of Lyon to be Harney's successor. Facing reassignment, Harney pleaded with the Lincoln administration to continue cooperation in good faith with Price and protested the acts of unnamed persons—a likely reference to Blair and Lyon—"who clamored for blood have not ceased to impugn my motives."

== Capture of Jefferson City ==
After Harney's dismissal, agitations renewed between unionist and secessionist factions. Governor Jackson and now-General Lyon agreed to a last-ditch peace negotiation in St. Louis on June 11, 1861. Representing the state were Jackson, Price, and staffer Thomas Snead. Lyon was accompanied by Blair and his staff Maj. H. L. Conant. At the meeting Jackson and Price reasserted their position from the Price-Harney agreement and offered a position of Unionist neutrality in exchange for the withdrawal of Lyon's troops from the state. This was considered secession in all but name by Lyon, who suspected Jackson and Prices secret requests for Confederate intervention. After four hours of discussion, Lyon angrily rose and, pointing down Jackson, Price, and Snead, stated:

Rather than concede to the State of Missouri the right to demand that my government shall not enlist troops within her limits, or bring troops into the State whenever it pleases, or move troops at its own will into, out of, or through the State; rather than concede to the State of Missouri for one single instant the right to dictate to my government in any matter, however unimportant, I would [pointing at the three state officials] see you, and you, and you, and you and every man, woman and child in the State, dead and buried. This means war. In an hour one of my officers will call for you and conduct you out of my lines."

Jackson, Price, and their staff promptly returned to Jefferson City and prepared to face Lyon with the Missouri State Guard long enough for Confederate forces to reach them.

In the meantime, Lyon prepared for a rapid advance on Jefferson City. The State government and legislature, fearing for its safety, began an exodus to nearby Boonville, Missouri, which was deemed more defensible from a military perspective. Price, as commander of the state militia, followed from the rear, destroying bridges to slow Lyon's advance. Lyon captured the capital on June 15, but only two state officers, including the Attorney General, remained.

== Provisional Missouri Government organized ==
On July 22, the executive committee of the Missouri State Convention reconvened and called for the convention to reassemble in Jefferson City. On July 30, the Missouri State Convention declared the existing state offices vacant. It then installed Hamilton R. Gamble as the military governor of Missouri and appointed the remaining state officers. It also declared all the seats of the legislature vacant and set a date for new elections.

Knott, the elected Attorney General, was still in Jefferson City but soon found himself under arrest and then deposed for refusing to take an oath to the second state government.

A series of skirmishes and battles between the Missouri State Guard and Union troops dominated the summer as Jackson's government fled to the southwest. Confederate troops crossed into the state to reinforce them in early August, culminating in the Battle of Wilson's Creek in August 1861 near Springfield in which Lyon was killed.

== Neosho Legislature and Secession Ordinance ==
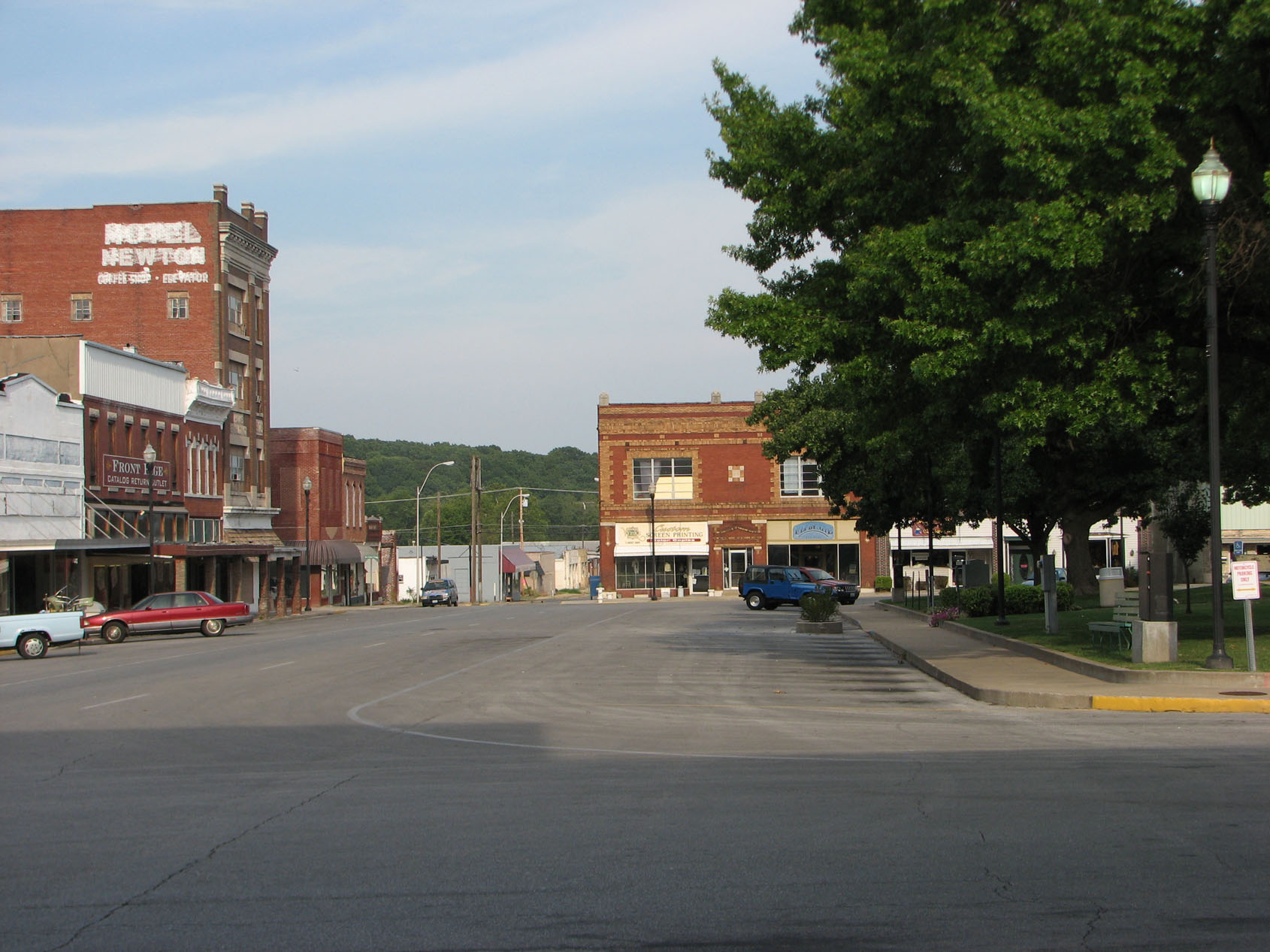
View of Neosho's town square. The building directly opposite was the site of the provisional Confederate state capitol building.

In the fall, Jackson's government set up a provisional capital and convened in the town of Neosho. On October 28, the legislature took up a bill for Missouri's secession from the Union, citing various "outrages" committed against the state and the overthrow of its government by Lyon. The bill was passed on October 30, and on October 31, it was signed by Governor Jackson, guaranteeing the secession of Missouri from the Union.

The Neosho Secession Ordinance has long been a source of mystery for historians due to the unusual circumstances surrounding it. Ironically, the authority to secede had originally been given by the legislature to the state convention based upon the idea that a constitutional rewrite might be needed for an ordinance of secession to be passed. It is unclear whether the legislature had the authority to secede under state, if not Federal, law without the direction of the convention. At the same time, however, it is questionable as to whether the State Constitutional Convention had the legal power to expel both the entire executive and legislature from office and appoint new state officers, especially considering that at that specific point in time, no ordinance of secession had been passed, and it was legally nebulous whether any of the previous officers had committed treason or any other impeachable offense. Questions remain unresolved to this day as to whether Jackson's secessionist government or Gamble's provisional government was the legitimate government of Missouri. Jackson supporters claimed their status as the popularly elected government of Missouri to bolster their legitimacy, whereas Gamble had control of the old state capitol and had also been placed in office by a body elected by the state to determine the state's place in the Union.

Perhaps the biggest mystery of Neosho is whether Jackson's legislature had a quorum to permit it to convene—a mystery that has prompted many historians to dismiss the Neosho government as a "rump legislature". The controversy exists for two reasons. First, surviving letters from earlier in the fall indicate that the vote was delayed until the end of October to obtain a quorum, which had been lacking. Second, the journals of the legislature which might have contained that information disappeared sometime during the war. The Senate journal was rediscovered in recent years among artifacts at the Wilson's Creek National Battlefield, and the House journal has only recently been found.

=== Evidence ===
In addition to the Senate journal, evidence of a House quorum has been speculated about on several grounds. Records of the secession bill itself show that Speaker of the House John McAfee presided over the session that adopted the bill. Clerk of the House Thomas H. Murry's signature also attests to the document's engrossment. The bill is also known to have been sponsored in the House by legislator George Graham Vest.

Reports of a quorum and even vote totals for both bodies also appeared quickly in some newspapers. Their reliability, however, is unknown. The [Columbia] Missouri Statesman on November 15, 1861, claimed a quorum was reached by October 22. The Charleston Mercury of November 25, 1861, reported the session as follows:

The meeting of the Missouri State Legislature, which passed the ordinance of secession at Neosho on the 2d inst. Was well attended—a full quorum being present, including 23 members of the Upper and 77 of the Lower House; 19 of the former and 68 of the latter constitute a quorum. The ordinance of secession was passed unanimously, and without a dissenting voice. It was dispatched to Richmond by a special messenger to the President, leaving Memphis yesterday morning en route.

One of the earliest historical accounts of Missouri's role in the Civil War written by former Confederate Col. John C. Moore, who also states that a quorum was present at the session:

In every particular it complied with the forms of law. It was called together in extraordinary session by the proclamation of the governor. There was a quorum of each house present. The governor sent to the two houses his message recommending, among other things, the passage of an act "dissolving all political connection between the State of Missouri and the United States of America." The ordinance was passed strictly in accordance with law and parliamentary usage, was signed by the presiding officers of the two houses, attested by John T. Crisp, secretary of the senate, and Thomas M. Murray, clerk of the house, and approved by Claiborne F. Jackson, governor of the State.

The House Journal, recently discovered in the collections of the State Historical Society of Missouri, casts doubt on such assertions of quorum. Complete from the beginning of the session to end, the handwritten document never reports a roll call vote, so there is no authentication of the quorum. Newspaper accounts of the claims of the lone House member who the Journal reports as having voted no on both the articles of secession and affiliation with the Confederacy, Isaac N. Shambaugh of DeKalb County, further cloud the earlier claims of legitimacy. The [Columbia] Missouri Statesman of January 31, 1862, offered coverage of Shambaugh's speech to constituents in which he claimed that the legislative quorum was fraudulent, with at best only 39 House members and 10 members of the Senate present at either Neosho or Cassville, and that the names of affirmative voting members were deliberately excluded from both House and Senate journals. He corroborated the House Journal by claiming to have been the lone no votes on the two bills.

== During and after the war ==
Acting on the ordinance passed by the Jackson government, the Confederate Congress admitted Missouri as the 12th confederate state on November 28, 1861. The Jackson government subsequently named Senators to the Confederate Congress. It was driven into exile from Missouri after Confederates lost control of the state and Jackson died a short while later in Arkansas. The secessionist government continued in exile, eventually setting up a legislature in Marshall, Texas, until the end of the war.

At the war's conclusion, the successors to the provisional (Union) government continued to govern the state of Missouri.

== See also ==
- Confederate government of Missouri
