= Nathaniel W. Watkins =

American politician

- Born: January 28, 1796; Kentucky
- Died: March 20, 1876 (aged 80)
- Alma mater: Transylvania College
- Spouse: Eliza Margaret Watson
- Relatives: Henry Clay (half-brother)
- Military career
- Allegiance: Confederate government of Missouri
- Branch: Missouri State Guard
- Rank: Brigadier general
- Commands: First District, Missouri State Guard
- Conflicts: American Civil War
- Other work: Soldier, lawyer, and Missouri politician

Nathaniel W. Watkins (January 28, 1796 – March 20, 1876) was a Kentucky-born soldier, lawyer, and Missouri politician who was also a half-brother to prominent nineteenth-century Kentucky politician Henry Clay. He served as a Confederate militia brigadier general during the American Civil War and before that in the War of 1812 and the Mexican–American War. He was a member of the Missouri State Senate and a Speaker of the Missouri House of Representatives. Watkins was also a founder of the city of Morley, Missouri.

Nathaniel Watkins was the son of Captain Henry Watkins and Elizabeth Clay Watkins, who was previously married to the Reverend John Clay and was the mother of 16 children including statesman Henry Clay. Watkins studied law at Transylvania College. After college he moved to Jackson, Missouri, in 1819. During the Civil War he briefly served as a brigadier general in the Missouri State Guard, the first Confederate unit in Missouri. Governor Claiborne Fox Jackson appointed him along with Meriwether Lewis Clark, Sr.; John Bullock Clark, Sr.; William Y. Slack; Alexander William Doniphan; Mosby Parsons; James H. McBride; James S. Rains; and Thomas Beverly Randolph as district/division commanders for the state. Watkins was appointed brigadier general and commander of the first military district which consisted of the Southeast Missouri. He resigned his commission in July 1861. In 1875, Watkins served as vice president of the Missouri Constitutional Convention.

Watkins was married to Eliza Margaret Watson, a daughter of a man named Goah Watson from New Madrid, Missouri. Their children included Nathaniel W. Watkins, Jr., John C., Henry Clay, Washington E., Richard Jones, William B., Amanda J., and Elizabeth.

== See also ==
- List of American Civil War generals (Acting Confederate)
