= Missouri Constitutional Convention of 1861–1863 =

The Missouri Constitutional Convention of 1861–1863 was a constitutional convention held in the state of Missouri during the American Civil War. The convention was elected in early 1861, and voted against secession. When open fighting broke out between Pro-Confederate governor Claiborne Fox Jackson and Union authorities, and Union forces occupied the state capital, the convention formed a provisional state government, and functioned as a quasi-legislature for several years. The convention never did produce a new constitution; that task was delegated to a new convention, elected in 1864.

== Background ==
Missouri has had four constitutions:

- 1820 (when the state entered the Union)
- 1865 (at the conclusion of the Civil War)
- 1875 (at the end of Reconstruction)
- 1945 (in the wake of the toppling of the Pendergast Machine).

The 1820 constitution provided for minor revisions to be made by amendment, but required that any general revision be carried out by an elected special convention. When secession was proposed, the Missouri General Assembly (the state legislature) voted that such a drastic change in the status of Missouri was comparable to such a general revision, that the General Assembly was not empowered to decide the issue, and called a convention.

The bill calling the convention passed on January 17. The election was scheduled for February 18, with three delegates chosen from each state senate district (99 total). In addition, by an amendment submitted by Charles H. Hardin, a secession declaration by the convention would have to be ratified in a referendum by a majority vote of the state's qualified voters. Hardin's amendment passed the state senate by only two votes, 17 to 15.

Three groups contended for the convention seats:

- One group called for Missouri to follow the Deep South slave states such as South Carolina by declaring secession immediately - not even waiting for Abraham Lincoln to take office as President.
- Another group opposed secession at any time; they were called unconditional unionists.
- A third group opposed immediate secession, but was willing to consider secession unless the various slavery-related political questions were resolved on terms acceptable to the slave states. These men were "conditional unionists".

The two unionist factions won nearly all the seats.

At that time, both outgoing governor Robert Marcellus Stewart and incoming governor Jackson had declared that Missouri should remain neutral in any conflict between the Union and Confederacy.

== First session ==
The State Convention of 1861, sometimes called the Gamble Convention, met on February 28, 1861, in the state's capital Jefferson City. 82 of the 99 delegates had been born in slave states, including 53 from Virginia and Kentucky. On March 1st, the convention chose as chairman former governor Sterling Price, a conditional unionist.

The convention then adjourned, and reassembled on March 4th in Mercantile Library in St. Louis. On March 19 the convention voted 89–1 against secession. The convention resolved:

That at present there is no adequate cause to impel Missouri to dissolve her connection with the Federal Union, but on the contrary she will labor for such an adjustment of existing troubles as will secure the peace, as well as the rights and equality of all the States.

The convention established a Federal relations committee, with unconditional unionist Hamilton Rowan Gamble as chairman. The committee declared that while most Missourians might sympathize with the South, secession from the Union was too dangerous.

The position of Missouri in relation to the adjacent States which would continue in the Union, would necessarily expose her, if she became a member of a new confederacy, to utter destruction whenever any rupture might take place between the different republics. In a military aspect, secession and connection with a Southern confederacy is annihilation for Missouri. The true position for her to assume is that of a State whose interests are bound up in the maintenance of the Union, and whose kind feelings and strong sympathies are with the people of the Southern States with whom they are connected by ties of friendship and blood.

The convention then adjourned.

== Second session ==
Missouri could remain inactive and effectively neutral, as long there was no fighting between the Union and the Confederacy. However, on April 13-14, Confederate forces bombarded and captured Fort Sumter in South Carolina. The following day Abraham Lincoln declared a state of rebellion existed and called for the states to provide troops to put down rebellion. This included a request for several regiments from Missouri.

Governor Jackson rejected the request, declaring it to be illegal, arguing that the constitution gave no authority to the federal government to make war on the states. On April 20th, secessionist militia companies seized the U.S. Arsenal in Liberty, Missouri. Governor Jackson plotted to seize the St. Louis Arsenal. He called out the state militia, appointed pro-secession officers to command it, and obtained artillery from the Confederacy.

Union forces under U.S. Army Captain Nathaniel Lyon reacted on May 10 surrounding the militia and taking them prisoner in the Camp Jackson Affair.

This drastic action prompted the General Assembly to pass a military bill proposed by Governor Jackson, which reorganized the militia as the Missouri State Guard. Jackson appointed Sterling Price as commander of the Guard.

Price and General William S. Harney, the top Union commander in Missouri, agreed to the Price-Harney Truce, which lasted until Lyon replaced Harney. Lyon met with Governor Jackson and General Price. He gave them one hour to leave the city, telling them he intended to seize control of the state from them.

Lyon then marched his forces on Jefferson City, entering the undefended state capital on June 15. The executive committee of the convention called a new session to meet on July 22. Twenty of the members were now in retreat with Jackson and Price (the original chairman). Pro-Union vice chairman Robert Wilson became the chairman.

The remaining convention members declared all of the state's elective offices to be vacant and appointed pro-Union provisional officers, some of whom were not even in the state at the time. These included:

- Governor - Hamilton Rowan Gamble
- Lt. Governor - Willard P. Hall
- Secretary of State - Mordecai Oliver
- Treasurer - George Caleb Bingham

The convention also declared all offices of the Missouri General Assembly vacant, and ordered an election to be held in November to fill the executive and legislative offices.

The convention adjourned on July 31.

== Third session ==
The constitutional convention met for the third time in St. Louis on October 10, 1861. It abolished many state offices, cut the salaries of state employees by 20 percent, postponed the planned state election to August 1862, created provisions for a new pro-Union state militia, and enacted a loyalty oath requirement for all state officials.

== Fourth session ==
The convention held its fourth session time in Jefferson City in June 1862. In this session, the convention imposed its loyalty oath on teachers, attorneys, bank officers, and preachers, and on voters, thereby ensuring a strong Union vote in future elections. (Lincoln, who had received 10.3% of the Missouri vote in the 1860 election, received 70% in the 1864 election.)

In 1861, General John C. Frémont had issued an emancipation decree for Missouri. Lincoln rescinded it as a dangerous measure that would alienate unionists in Missouri and Kentucky. In 1862, the convention tried unsuccessfully to abolish slavery in Missouri.

== Fifth session ==
Lincoln's Emancipation Proclamation declared free all slaves in Confederate-held territory, but not those in Union-held territory such as states that had not seceded. The final session of the convention met in June 1863 with the aim of eliminating slavery in the state. The major obstacle was a provision in the constitution that required consent of the slave's owner and payment of compensation. The state did not have enough money to do so. Therefore, the convention passed an ordinance for gradual emancipation with compensation, a process to be completed on 4 July 1870.

== Constitutional convention of 1865 ==
This plan for gradual emancipation infuriated the Radical Republicans, who wanted slavery abolished immediately. They took their grievances to Lincoln, who refused to take sides in the dispute. Provisional governor Gamble offered to resign, but the convention would not accept it. He died in office on January 31, 1864.

Lincoln's inaction became a grievance for the Radicals, and in the election of 1864, they nominated John C. Frémont for President, hoping to replace Lincoln. (Frémont dropped out of the campaign a few weeks later).

The Radicals also arranged for elections to a new constitutional convention. In November 1864, the Radicals won two-thirds of the seats to the convention, which elected Radical leader Thomas Clement Fletcher as governor of Missouri.

The convention met in the Mercantile Library on January 6, 1865. On 11 January, the convention, by a 60 to 4 vote, abolished slavery in the state with no compensation for owners. A month later the convention approved the Thirteenth Amendment to the United States Constitution to abolish slavery throughout the U.S. The convention also wrote a new constitution for the state, which remained in force until 1875.
