= Hamilton Rowan Gamble =

American jurist and politician (1798–1864)

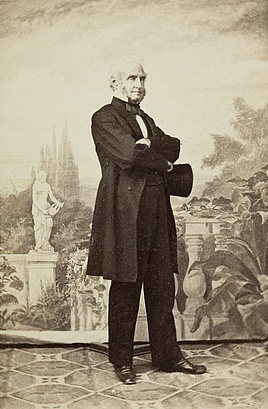

16th Governor of Missouri
- In office July 31, 1861 – January 31, 1864
- Lieutenant: Willard Preble Hall
- Preceded by: Claiborne Fox Jackson
- Succeeded by: Willard Preble Hall

Chief Justice of the Missouri Supreme Court
- In office 1852

Justice of the Missouri Supreme Court
- In office 1851–1855

Missouri Secretary of State
- In office 1824–1826
- Governor: Frederick Bates; Abraham J. Williams
- Preceded by: William Grymes Pettus
- Succeeded by: Spencer Darwin Pettis

Personal details
- Born: November 29, 1798 Winchester, Virginia, U.S.
- Died: January 31, 1864 (aged 65) St. Louis, Missouri, U.S.
- Resting place: Bellefontaine Cemetery, St. Louis, Missouri
- Party: Republican
- Profession: Judge, politician

Military service
- Allegiance: United States
- Branch/service: Missouri State Militia
- Years of service: 1832; 1861–1862
- Battles/wars: Black Hawk War; American Civil War

Hamilton Rowan Gamble (November 29, 1798 – January 31, 1864) was an American jurist and politician who served as the Chief Justice of the Missouri Supreme Court at the time of the Dred Scott case in 1852. Although his colleagues voted to overturn the 28-year precedent in Missouri of "once free always free," Gamble wrote a dissenting opinion. During the American Civil War, he was appointed as the 16th governor of Missouri by a Constitutional Convention after Union forces captured the state capital at Jefferson City and deposed the elected governor, Claiborne Jackson.

== Early life and education ==
Hamilton Gamble was born in 1798 in Winchester, Virginia, in the Shenandoah Valley, the youngest of seven children of Joseph and Anne Hamilton Gamble. His parents were Scots-Irish immigrants who had reached Virginia in 1784 from northern Ireland. Gamble first studied locally and at age 13 went to Hampden-Sydney College, a Presbyterian seminary or secondary academy. In the practice of the time, he read the law to practice with an established firm, and by 1817 was accepted to the bar in Virginia.

== Move to Missouri and career ==
In 1818 as a young man of 20, he moved to St. Louis, Missouri to join his older brother Archibald Gamble, an attorney who had moved there earlier and was established as a clerk of the St. Louis Circuit Court.

After practicing in Franklin in the middle of the state, Gamble became prosecuting attorney of the Circuit Court of Howard County, Missouri. In 1824, Governor Frederick Bates appointed him as Missouri Secretary of State and he moved to the capital, then located at St. Charles, Missouri.

When the capital was moved to Jefferson City, Gamble returned to St. Louis in 1826, settling in what was the major city of the state. He set up a private legal practice there.

Although a slaveholder, he at times was appointed to represent enslaved persons in court, especially in what were called freedom suits, which they filed to challenge their captivity. If the court accepted a case, it assigned an attorney from the bar to represent the slave. In the antebellum period, a majority of known cases in Missouri were settled in the slave's favor, often as a result of a slave having been held in a free state by a master, which caused them to forfeit their property rights.

Gamble was influenced by current movements that proposed another alternative for freed slaves to staying in American society. He became a member of the American Colonization Society, which supported the "resettlement" of free blacks from the US to the new colony of Liberia. While some supporters suggested this was an effort to return such individuals to their homeland, by this time, most African Americans in the US were native born, some with generations of history in the nation. Many wanted to gain legal rights here rather than to leave the country.

== Marriage and family ==
In 1827, Gamble married Caroline J. Coalter of Columbia, South Carolina. He likely met her when she was visiting St. Louis, as both her brother David Coalter and a sister lived there. Her sister had married attorney Edward Bates of St. Louis. In addition to representing some slaves in freedom suits, Bates later served as a judge and as US Attorney General under President Abraham Lincoln.

Hamilton and Caroline had three children: Hamilton, David, and Mary Coalter Gamble.

== Judicial and later career ==
In 1846, Gamble was elected to the Missouri Supreme Court by the Whig Party, the first justice from this party. He was quickly elected as chief justice, on a rotating term. Though a slaveholder, he dissented in the Missouri Supreme Court decision of the Dred Scott v. Emerson case. He supported the 28-year-old precedent set in the 1824 ruling of "once free always free" in Winny v. Whitesides. He maintained that Scott (and his family) were free because he had been held illegally as a slave while resident in a free state.

Gamble resigned his judgeship in 1855 due to failing health, and in 1858 moved to Pennsylvania.

== Provisional Governor of Missouri ==
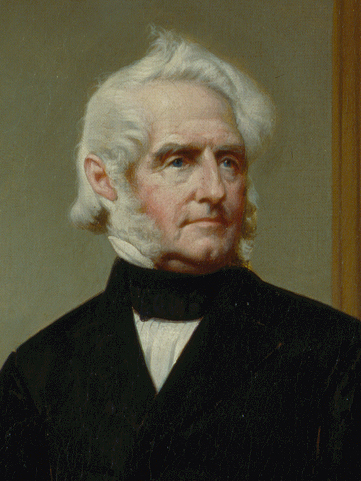
Governor Hamilton Rowan Gamble, painting from 1865

As the secession crisis deepened, Missouri attempted to follow a policy of armed neutrality, in which the state would not support either side in the war but remain in the Union. A special election in February established a Missouri Constitutional Convention to determine the relationship between Missouri and the United States. The convention voted against secession and affirmed the state's neutrality.

The outbreak of hostilities at Fort Sumter led to unrest in Missouri. Secessionists seized the Liberty Arsenal a week later. Governor Claiborne Jackson called up the state militia for drill in St. Louis and to receive some arms clandestinely obtained from the Confederacy. This resulted in a confrontation with the aggressive Union commander Nathaniel Lyon, who forced the surrender of the militia, in what was called the Camp Jackson Affair. After a deadly riot ensued, the Missouri legislature authorized the reorganization of the militia into the Missouri State Guard, controlled by the governor. General William Harney reached an agreement with the new Missouri State Guard commander Sterling Price, known as the Price-Harney Truce.

Lincoln appointed Lyon to replace Harney as Commander of the Department of the West. During negotiations among the governor, Lyon, and Price, Lyon would not accept the governor's proposed limitations on Federal troops and volunteers. The meeting ended abruptly with Lyon declaring, "Rather than concede to the state of Missouri….the right to dictate to my government in any matter however unimportant, I would see you, and you, and you, and you, and you, and every man, woman, and child in the state dead and buried. This means war." As the Missouri government fled into exile, Lyon rapidly captured the capitol at Jefferson City, Missouri a few days later in mid-June 1861.

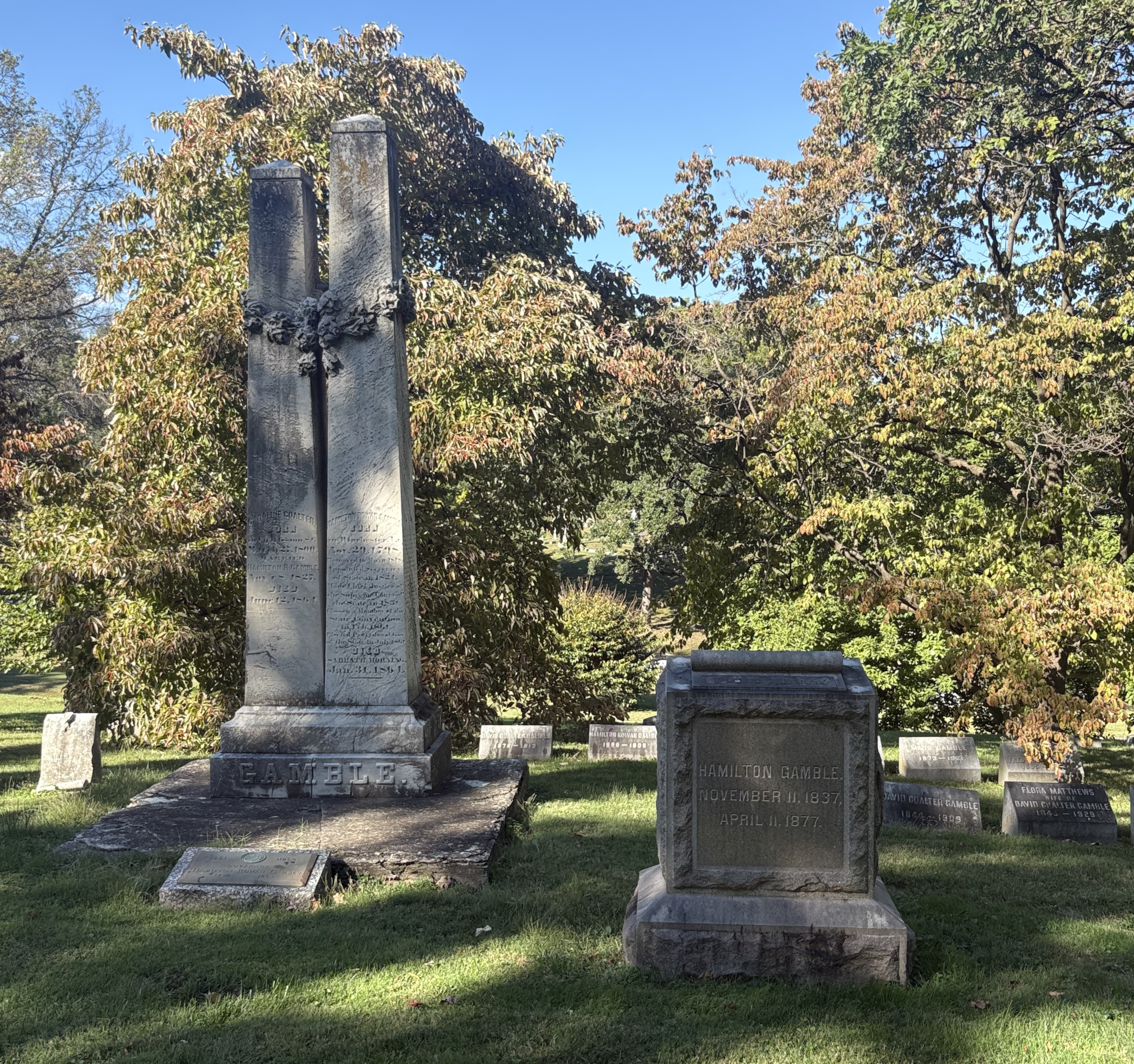
Gamble's grave at Bellefontaine Cemetery

The pro-Union members of the Missouri Constitutional Convention reconvened in July 1861 to consider the status of the state. The convention declared the governor's office and state legislative offices to be vacant and appointed Gamble as governor of a provisional government of Missouri on August 1. Gov. Jackson called a session of the General Assembly in Neosho, Missouri, and, in late October with a dubious quorum, passed an ordinance of secession. Although secessionists considered Gamble an unelected puppet of the Union forces, he opposed harsh Union treatment of the state. For instance, he protested to President Lincoln about the Fremont Emancipation, which unilaterally freed the state's slaves in 1861 and imposed martial law. Lincoln agreed to Gamble's request to overturn this decision, rescinded the emancipation, and removed John C. Fremont from command.

Gamble died in office at his home in St. Louis on January 31, 1864, after suffering complications from an infection of a broken arm. He is buried at Bellefontaine Cemetery in St. Louis.

Political offices
Preceded by William Grymes Pettus	Missouri Secretary of State; 1824–1826	Succeeded by Spencer Darwin Pettis
Preceded by Claiborne Fox Jackson as the undisputed Governor	Unionist Governor of Missouri; 1861–1864	Succeeded by Willard Preble Hall
