= Missouri Volunteer Militia =

Former state militia of Missouri, United States

The Missouri Volunteer Militia (MVM) was the state militia organization of Missouri, before the formation of the Missouri State Guard in the American Civil War.

Prior to the Civil War, Missouri had an informal state militia that could be called up by the governor for emergencies or annual drill "in accordance with the Missouri State Statutes of 1854."

Larger militia elements, such as brigades or the element employed in the November 1860 Southwest Expedition of James Montgomery, were composed of independent regularly drilling volunteer companies, such as the St. Louis Grays, the National Guards, and the Washington Blues. Each of these companies wore its own distinctive, and highly ornate, uniform. Antebellum esprit de corps was enhanced by drill competitions among the independent companies.

== Secession ==
On 21 March 1861, the Missouri Constitutional Convention voted against secession.

After the start of the Civil War, Governor Claiborne Jackson called up part of the MVM under Frost, and sent them to Camp Jackson for training. Fearing Missouri would join in Second Wave Secession, Union forces under General Lyon attacked the Camp in what is known as the "Camp Jackson Affair". Union forces then marched into the city of St. Louis, and the cities residents began protesting the attack on their state. The Union Army opened fire on the crowds as they went through the city, killing 28 civilians and wounding around 100 more, making it one of the largest killings of American civilians by the military in US history.

On June 11, Governor Jackson met with Francis Preston Blair Jr. and Nathaniel Lyon, who on Blair's suggestion was appointed by the U.S. War Department as Commander of the Western Department of the U.S. Army, at St. Louis' Planter's House Hotel to negotiate. A compromise was not reached and both sides afterwards blamed each other. On June 12, 1861, Governor Jackson issued a Proclamation to the State:

Now, therefore I, C.F. JACKSON, Governor of the State of Missouri, do, in view of the foregoing facts, and by virtue of the powers vested in me by the Constitution and laws of this Commonwealth, issue this, my proclamation, calling the militia of the State, to the number of 50,000, into active service of the State, for the purpose of repelling such invasions, and for the protection of the lives, liberties and property of the citizens of this State, and I earnestly exhort all good citizens of Missouri to rally to the flag of their State for the protection of their endangered homes and firesides, and for the defence of their most sacred rights and dearest liberties.

Failure to restore the Price–Harney Truce conditions escalated tensions, and Missouri became engulfed in guerrilla warfare and went through a series of bitter battles at the end of the Civil war.

== See also ==
- Enrolled Missouri Militia
- Home Guard (Union)
- Missouri State Guard
- Missouri State Militia (Union)
- Provisional Enrolled Missouri Militia
