= Confederate government of Missouri =

Government of Missouri in exile (1861–1865)

Missouri
- 1861–1865
- Flag Coat of arms

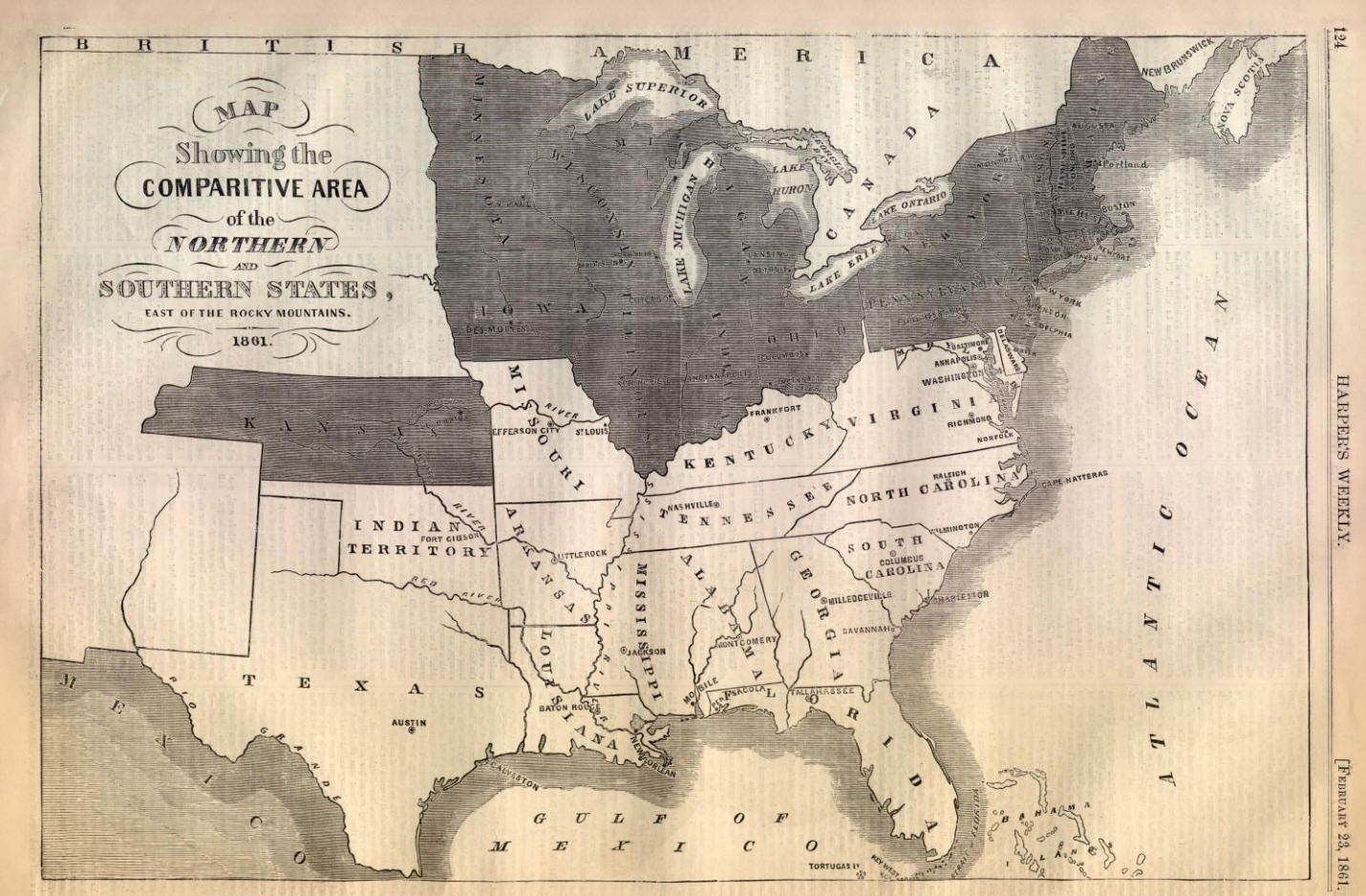
- Status: Confederate state
- Capital: Neosho, Missouri (1861)
- Capital-in-exile: Marshall, Texas
- Government: Single-executive system
- Governor
  - 1861–1862: Claiborne F. Jackson
  - 1862–1865: Thomas C. Reynolds
- History
  - Seccession: 28 October 1861
  - Joined Confederate: November 28, 1861
  - Surrender: 26 May 1865
- Today part of: Missouri

The Confederate government of Missouri was a continuation in exile of the government of pro-Confederate Governor Claiborne F. Jackson. It existed until General E. Kirby Smith surrendered all Confederate troops west of the Mississippi River at New Orleans, May 26, 1865.

== History ==
The Confederate "Battle Flag", numbering 12 and 13 stars for Missouri and Kentucky

As the Civil War began, many leading citizens were hoping the state could remain neutral in the growing conflict. These hopes were encompassed in the so-called Price–Harney Truce of May 21, 1861. Implementation of the truce fell prey, however, to the growing conflict. At a meeting held at Planters' House in St. Louis, June 11, 1861, it became clear that leading Missourians would have to choose sides. In the fall of 1861, Governor Claiborne Jackson and other leading Missouri secessionists met in Neosho, Missouri. Acting as the Missouri General Assembly, this body enacted an ordinance of secession on October 28, 1861; however, the legal status of this ordinance was not accepted by Missouri's Union supporters, then or later.

The secession government applied for and, on November 28, 1861, was granted admission to the Confederacy as its purported 12th state. As a result of military operations, however, particularly the Battle of Pea Ridge in March 1862, the Confederate government of Missouri was not able to establish control over much of the state; its jurisdiction extended only as far as Confederate military strength could reach. Governor Jackson and his government were forced into exile. The exiled government established operations in Marshall, Texas, as part of the Trans-Mississippi bloc of Southern civil governments.

Although Confederate supporters in Missouri were unable to make good on their secession, the Southern government-in-exile sent legislators to the Congress of the Confederate States, and Missouri was represented by the twelfth star on the Confederate flag.

== See also ==
- Missouri in the American Civil War
- Confederate government of Kentucky, one of two rival state governments in Kentucky
- Restored Government of Virginia, one of two rival state governments in Virginia
- Confederate government of West Virginia, a rival government to the Restored Government of Virginia

Preceded by Tennessee	List of C.S. states by date of admission to the Confederacy; Admitted on November 28, 1861 (12th)	Succeeded by Kentucky
