= William Grymes Pettus =

American politician (1794–1867)

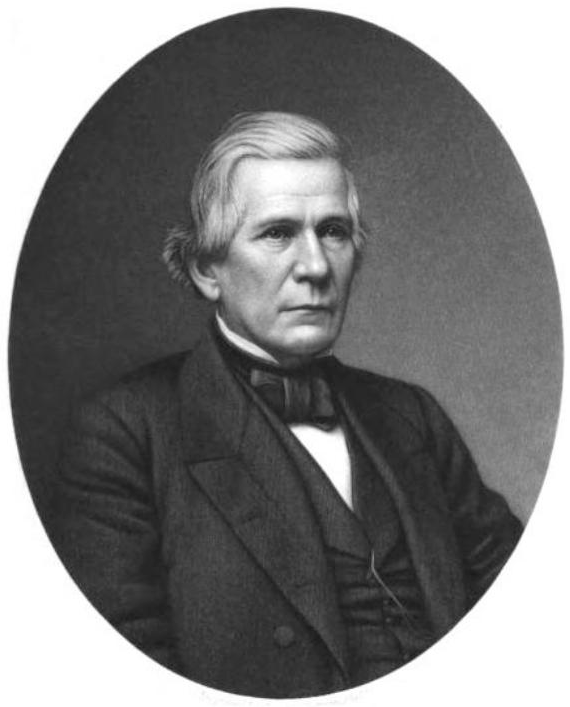

Member of the Missouri Senate
- In office 1832
- Constituency: St. Charles District

Secretary of State of Missouri
- In office 1821–1824

Personal details
- Born: December 31, 1794 Mecklenburg County, Virginia
- Died: December 25, 1867 (aged 72) St. Louis, Missouri
- Resting place: Bellefontaine Cemetery
- Party: Democratic-Republican
- Spouse: Caroline R. Morrison (m. 1826)

William Grymes Pettus (1794–1867) was a Missouri politician.

== Biography ==
William Grymes Pettus was born in Mecklenburg County, Virginia on December 31, 1794. In 1818, he arrived in St. Louis, where he served in the War of 1812. While a United States General Land Office clerk in St. Louis, he was elected secretary of the State Convention which wrote the Missouri Constitution when it was admitted into the United States in 1821.

His public service included Secretary of State in the Alexander McNair administration, Probate Judge of St. Louis County, and in 1832 he was elected a member of the Missouri Senate for the St. Charles District.

He married Caroline R. Morrison on December 31, 1826.

He died in St. Louis on December 25, 1867. He was buried at Bellefontaine Cemetery.

Political offices
Preceded by Joshua Barton	Missouri Secretary of State; 1821–1824	Succeeded by Hamilton Rowan Gamble
