= Camp Jackson affair =

Massacre during American Civil War

Coordinates: 38.636551°N 90.236721°W

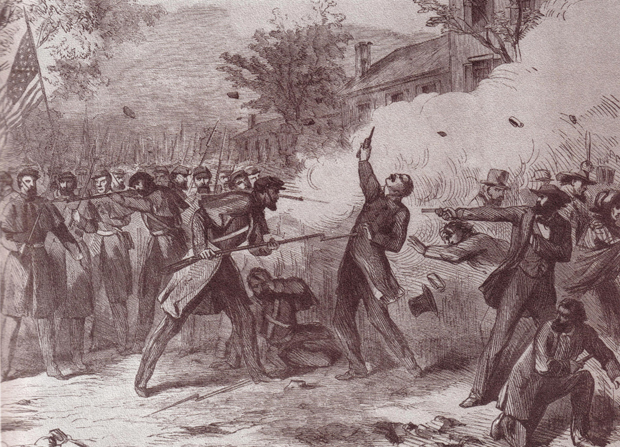
"Terrible Tragedy at St. Louis, Mo.", wood engraving originally published in the New York Illustrated News, 1861

The Camp Jackson affair, also known as the Camp Jackson massacre, occurred during the American Civil War on May 10, 1861, when a volunteer Union Army regiment captured a unit of the Missouri Volunteer Militia at Camp Jackson, outside the city of St. Louis, in the divided slave state of Missouri.

The newly appointed Union commander in Missouri, Brigadier General Nathaniel Lyon, had learned that the ostensibly-neutral state militia training in Camp Jackson was planning to raid the federal arsenal in St. Louis. That led to him and his regiments, consisting mostly of pro-Union German immigrants, marching into St. Louis and capturing the rebels. After capturing the entire unit, Lyon marched the captives into town to parole them. En route, hostile secessionist crowds gathered and began throwing rocks and shouting ethnic slurs at Lyon's regiments. After a drunk man fired into their ranks, fatally wounding a soldier, Lyon's men opened fire on the mob, killing at least 28 people and injuring dozens of others. Several days of rioting throughout St. Louis followed. The violence ended only after martial law had been imposed and Union regulars dispatched to the city.

Lyon's actions ensured Union control of St. Louis and Missouri for the rest of the war but also deepened the ideological divisions within a state that had initially sought to remain neutral in the larger conflict.

== Background ==
Missouri was a slave state, and many of its leaders were Southern sympathizers who favored secession and joining the Confederacy when the Civil War began. However, only a minority initially favored secession.

Nevertheless, by early 1861, both pro- and anti-secession factions in Missouri were organizing military and paramilitary forces. Secessionists organized as "Minutemen" and were often assisted by state officials. On February 13, Brigadier General Daniel M. Frost enrolled five companies of St. Louis-area Minutemen as the new 2nd Regiment of the Missouri Volunteer Militia. The same month, a new law banned militia activity outside the framework of that militia, which forced pro-Union activists to organize in secret.

On February 28, Missouri elected a Constitutional Convention to amend the state constitution and decide the issue of secession. On March 21, the Convention voted 98 to 1 against secession but also voted not to supply weapons or men to either side if war broke out. The Convention then adjourned.

On April 20, several days after the Battle of Fort Sumter, a pro-Confederate mob seized the Liberty Arsenal in Liberty, Missouri, and stole about 1000 rifles and muskets. This sparked fears that Confederates would also seize the much larger St. Louis Arsenal, which had nearly 40,000 rifles and muskets, the largest stockpile in any slave state.

== Initial Unionist actions ==
Missouri was within the Department of the West, a geographical command of the United States Army that was commanded by Brigadier General William S. Harney, with its headquarters at Jefferson Barracks in St. Louis. Harney, an elderly career officer, wished to avoid open conflict with secessionist forces.

On April 23, the War Department replaced Harney with Captain Nathaniel Lyon as acting commander. Lyon, a passionate Unionist, immediately began enlisting and arming St. Louis Unionists as home guard "Missouri Volunteers," an action that had been ordered by the Secretary of War but not acted upon by Harney. Most of Lyon's early recruits were "Forty-Eighters" and "Wide Awakes," a marching society formed during the 1860 election by the Republican Party. According to one estimate, 80% of the volunteers in the first Missouri Volunteer regiments were German-American immigrants. Pro-slavery native-born Missourians prejudicially targeted the anti-slavery foreign-born Germans.

By order of the War Department, Lyon's next action was to move the arms held in the St. Louis Arsenal out of reach of Missouri secessionists. Early in the morning of April 26, 1861, nearly 21,000 rifles were loaded on the steamer City of Alton, which carried them across the Mississippi River to Illinois. The remainder were held for issue to Lyon's Missouri Volunteers.

== Secessionist actions ==
Missouri Governor Claiborne Fox Jackson had been elected in 1860 on the ticket of the pro-Union Douglas faction of the Democratic Party but privately supported secession. Since the Constitutional Convention had voted against secession, Jackson and his fellow secessionists decided to carry it out by seizing St. Louis by force and presenting the people of Missouri with a fait accompli. The most significant obstacle was the St. Louis Arsenal, which was heavily fortified with thick walls.

In mid-April 1861, Jackson wrote to Confederate President Jefferson Davis and asked for heavy artillery to breach the walls of the arsenal. His letter was carried by militia officers Colton Greene and Basil Wilson Duke. Around May 1, Jackson called out part of the Missouri Volunteer Militia for "maneuvers" near St. Louis, under the command of Brigadier General Daniel M. Frost. The militia set up "Camp Jackson", about 4.5 miles (7.2 km) northwest of the arsenal. The campsite was located at Lindell's Grove (then outside the city of St. Louis, and today part of the campus of St. Louis University on Lindell Boulevard).

Davis agreed to Jackson's request. On May 9, the steamer J. C. Swan delivered the Confederate aid: two 12-pound howitzers, two 32-pound siege guns, 500 muskets, and ammunition in crates marked as Tamoroa marble. The Confederates had captured these munitions when they seized the Federal Baton Rouge Arsenal. Militia officers met the shipment at the St. Louis riverfront and transported it to Camp Jackson, 6 miles (9.7 km) inland.

== Conflict ==
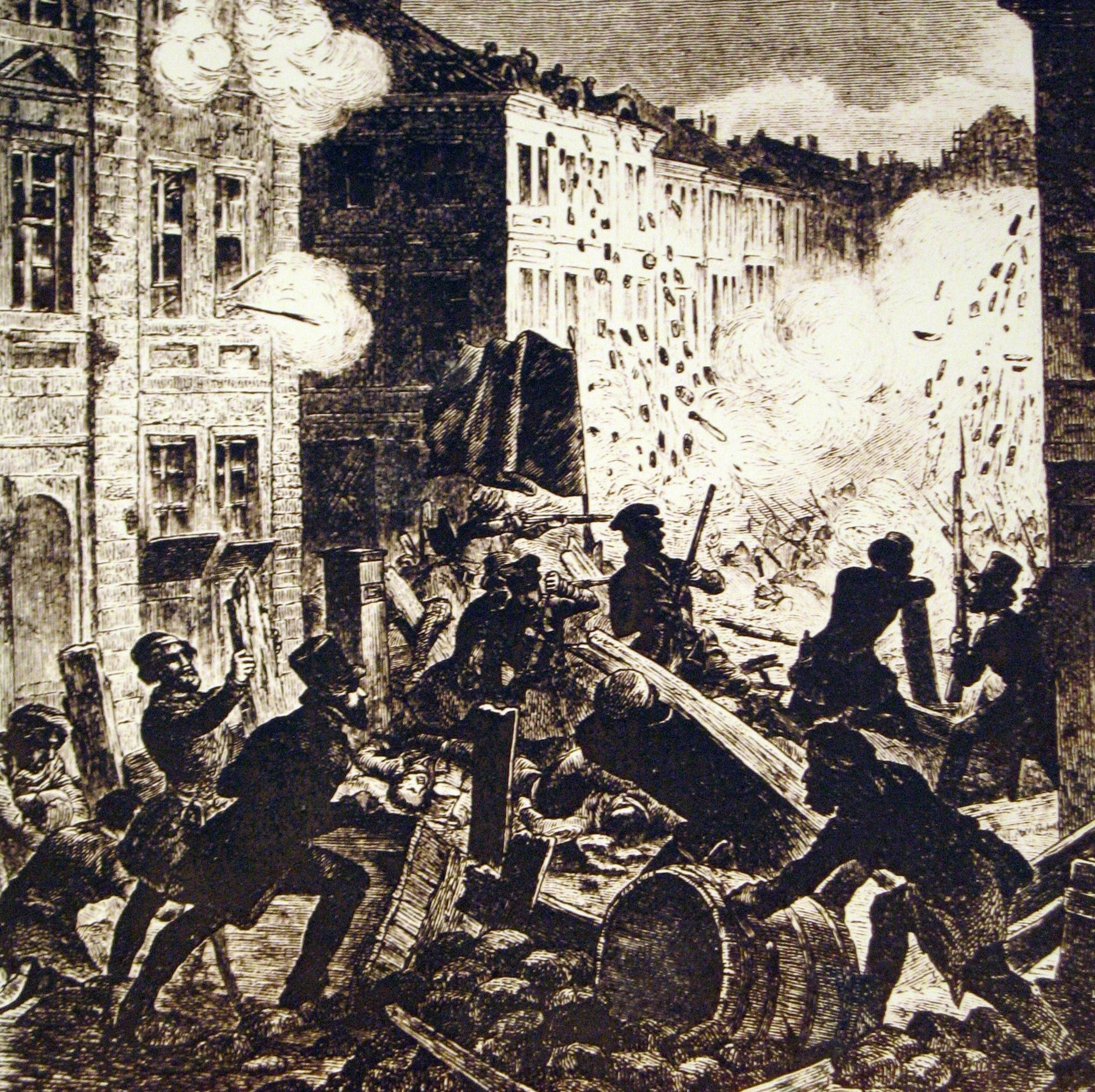
St. Louis Riot

Lyon suspected the Camp Jackson forces of conspiring to attack the arsenal. His suspicions were confirmed by personal investigation after he visited Camp Jackson, allegedly disguised as an older woman. On May 10, Lyon marched on Camp Jackson with about 6,000 Missouri Volunteers and U.S. Regulars. Lyon forced the surrender of the militia, taking 669 prisoners.

Lyon placed the captured soldiers under arrest and began marching them under guard to the arsenal, where they were paroled and ordered to disperse. But the long march was seen as humiliating by pro-secession residents of the city. Angry secessionists shouted insults at the Union troops and threw rocks and debris at them. Units composed predominantly of ethnic Germans were particularly targeted, with shouts of "Damn the Dutch!"

This eventually led to gunfire. Exactly what provoked the shooting remains unclear, but the most common explanation is that a drunkard stumbled into the path of Lyon's marching soldiers and fired a pistol into their ranks, fatally wounding Captain Constantin Blandowski of the 3rd Missouri Volunteer Infantry. (Note: Although usually described as "German", Blandowski was ethnically Polish, born in Upper Silesia, on the German side of the Russo-German frontier. He received his military training in Germany, served with the French Foreign Legion, and fought for the Hungarian rebels in the failed Hungarian Revolution of 1848. After emigrating to the U.S., he was active in the Turnverein movement in St. Louis. Despite his Polish ethnicity, he was embraced by the German-American community as a martyr and a symbol of ethnic-German devotion to the Union.) The Volunteers, in reaction, fired over the heads of the crowd, and then into the crowd. Some 28 people were killed, including women and children. Over 75 others were wounded.

The incident sparked several days of civil unrest in St. Louis. On May 11, Volunteers were fired upon from windows at 5th and Walnut streets; they returned fire at the mob. Colonel Henry Boernstein, commander of the 2nd Missouri Volunteer Infantry and publisher of the Anzeiger des Westens, a German-language newspaper in St. Louis, remarked in his memoirs that he gave several of his men leave to visit their families on the morning of May 11 and that "Most of them did not return... until it grew dark, with clothing torn, faces beaten bloody, and all the signs of having suffered mistreatment... Two of them never returned and they were never heard of again."

Rumors spread throughout the city that the Germans were planning to murder the American population of the city; many wealthy St. Louisans fled to Illinois or the Missouri interior. Martial law was imposed, and with the arrival of federal regulars to relieve the German volunteers, the violence came to an end.

== Aftermath ==
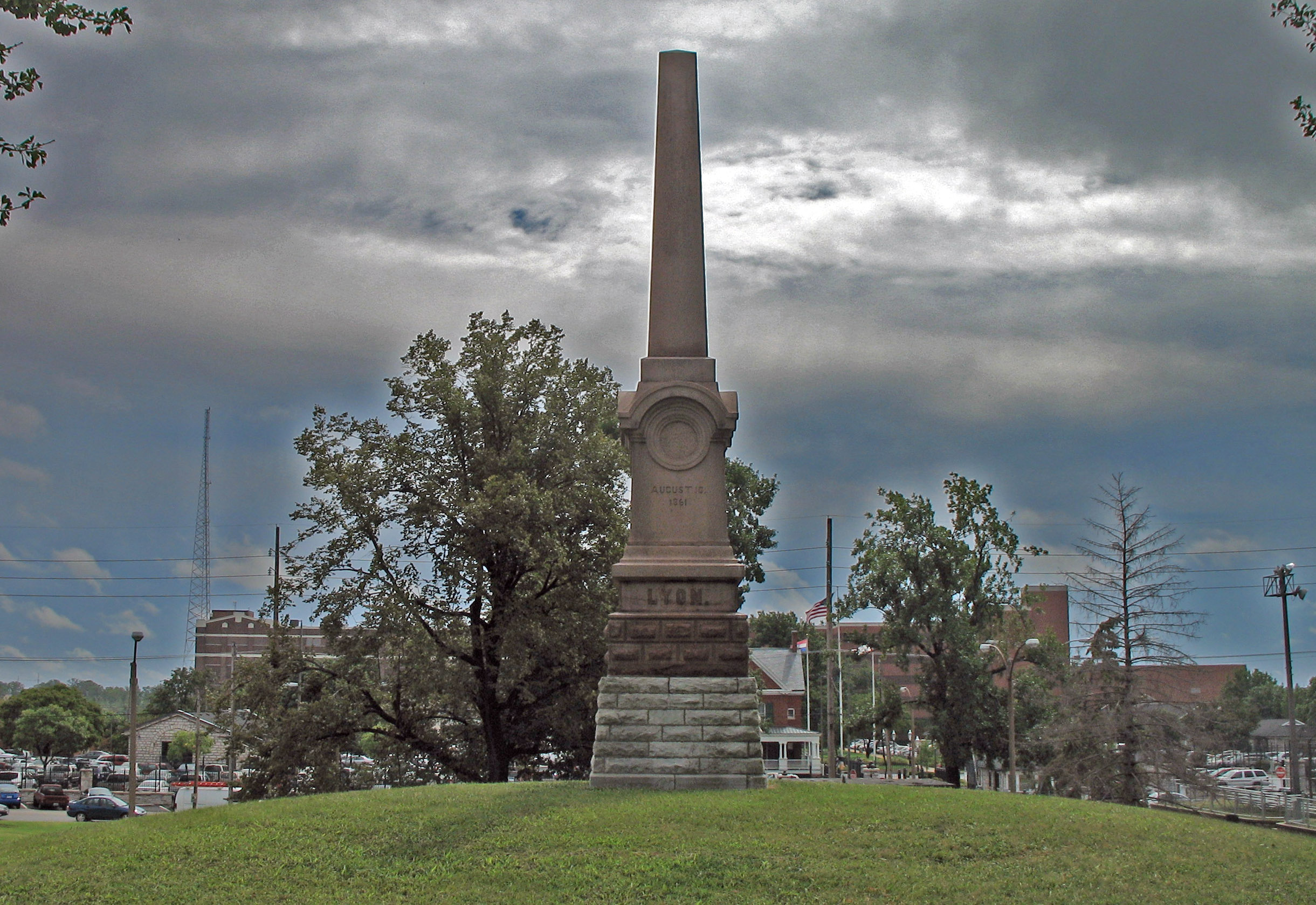
Monument to Nathaniel Lyon with the arsenal in the background

Governor Jackson had previously proposed a "Military Bill," which would put the state on a war footing, create a new state military force, and grant the Governor broad executive powers. The bill had stalled at first, but on May 11, the day after the Camp Jackson affair, it was passed by the Missouri General Assembly, which created the Missouri State Guard with Major General Sterling Price as its commander. Unionists described the bill as a "secession act in all but name." Critics also observed that since it stated that all adult men were to be considered reserves of the State Guard and granted the governor vast powers as commander of the Guard, it made Jackson dictator of the state.

William S. Harney was reinstated as Commander of the Western District and met with Price on May 21. They signed the Price–Harney Truce, which left the federal military in charge of St. Louis and allowed Price's state militia to maintain order in the rest of the state. Many Missouri Unionists considered the agreement a capitulation to Jackson and the secessionists and lobbied President Abraham Lincoln for Harney's removal from command. Unionists outside St. Louis reported harassment by secessionists, despite Harney's implicit understanding that the Missouri State Guard would protect them, and many fled to St. Louis for refuge.

Frank Blair was a well-known Republican leader and former U.S. Representative from St. Louis, as well as a recently promoted colonel. Lincoln authorized him to relieve Harney at his discretion. On May 30, Blair relieved Harney and permanently replaced him with Lyon. Lyon was promoted to brigadier general and assigned command of all Union forces in Missouri.

On June 11, Lyon met with Jackson, Price, and their aides at the Planter's House hotel in St. Louis. They argued for four hours (much of it over Jackson's powers under the "Military Bill") before Lyon abruptly ended the meeting by declaring, "Rather than concede to the State of Missouri for one single instant the right to dictate to my government in any matter however important, I would see you, and you, and you, and you, and every man, woman, and child in the State, dead and buried! This means war. In an hour one of my officers will call on you and conduct you out of my lines."

Jackson returned to the state capital at Jefferson City. Lyon delivered federal troops by steamboat to Jefferson City on June 12, and Jackson fled west to join newly assembled State Guard troops near Boonville. Lyon's men occupied the capital without resistance and pursued Jackson with approximately 1,400 volunteers and US Army regulars. Against the advice of his senior officers, Jackson exercised his authority as commander-in-chief and ordered the State Guard to make a stand at Boonville. In the resulting Battle of Boonville on June 17, Lyon's troops routed the State Guard. Jackson, the State Guard, and a few secessionist state legislators escaped to southwest Missouri, near the Arkansas border, which left most of the state under federal control.

The Constitutional Convention reconvened on July 22 and declared the office of Governor vacant because of Jackson's absence. (Note: 20 of the 99 members of the Constitutional Convention were not present since they had retreated to the southwest with Jackson and so did not participate in the vote.) The Convention then voted to appoint former Chief Justice of the Missouri Supreme Court and conservative Unionist Hamilton Rowan Gamble as Governor of the Provisional Government of Missouri. The Lincoln administration recognized Gamble's government.

Nativism, mistrust of the federal government, fears for and of slavery, and states' rights issues all played roles in provoking the Camp Jackson affair. The incident immediately polarized the state between Union and Confederate supporters. Previously, most Missourians had advocated neutrality, but many were now forced to take sides.

Some Missourians had attempted to find a compromise as "Conditional Unionists," who opposed secession but with conditions: slavery would not be interfered with, and no "coercion" or military force be used against the seceding states of the Confederacy. After the Camp Jackson affair, many of the "Conditional Unionists" became full Confederate supporters, such as former Governor Sterling Price.

== See also ==
- List of incidents of civil unrest in the United States
- St. Louis in the American Civil War
- Missouri in the American Civil War

== Sources ==
- Parrish, William E. (1998). Frank Blair: Lincoln's Conservative. Columbia and London: University of Missouri Press. ISBN 0-8262-1156-9.
- Cutrer, Thomas E. (2022). Theater of a Separate War: The Civil War West of the Mississippi River, 1861–1865. Chapel Hill, North Carolina: University of North Carolina Press. ISBN 9781469666280.
