= Willard P. Hall =

American lawyer and politician (1820–1882)

Willard Preble Hall
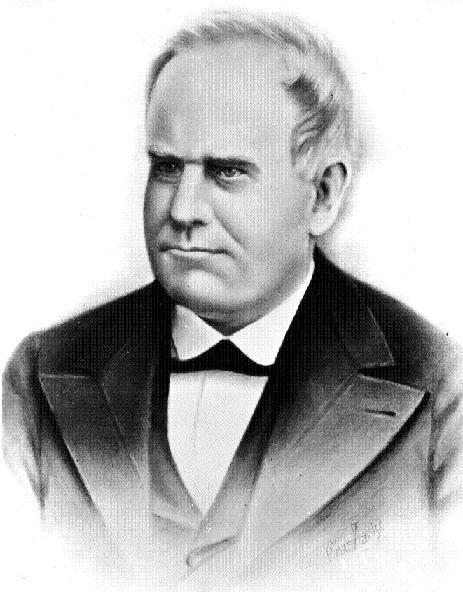

17th Governor of Missouri
- In office January 31, 1864 – January 2, 1865
- Lieutenant: Vacant
- Preceded by: Hamilton Rowan Gamble
- Succeeded by: Thomas Clement Fletcher

Member of the U.S. House of Representatives from Missouri's 4th district
- In office March 4, 1847 – March 3, 1853
- Preceded by: none
- Succeeded by: Mordecai Oliver

Lieutenant Governor of Missouri
- In office 1861–1864
- Governor: Hamilton Rowan Gamble
- Preceded by: Thomas Caute Reynolds
- Succeeded by: George Smith

Personal details
- Born: May 9, 1820 Harpers Ferry, West Virginia, U.S.
- Died: November 2, 1882 (aged 62) St. Joseph, Missouri, U.S.
- Party: Republican
- Education: Yale College
- Profession: lawyer

Military service
- Branch/service: First Missouri Cavalry Regiment
- Rank: Lieutenant
- Battles/wars: Mexican–American War

William Willard Preble Hall (May 9, 1820 – November 2, 1882) was an American lawyer and politician. He served as the 17th governor of Missouri from 1864 to 1865 during the last years of the American Civil War.

== Early years ==
Hall was born in Harpers Ferry, then in Virginia. He attended a private school in Baltimore, Maryland, and graduated from Yale University in 1839.

He accompanied his father, John H. Hall, to Randolph County, Missouri, in 1840. He studied law and was admitted to the bar at Huntsville in 1841, commencing his law practice in Sparta, Buchanan County, Missouri in 1842. He was appointed circuit attorney in 1843 and served for several years. He was a presidential elector on the Democratic ticket in 1844.

During the Mexican–American War, Hall enlisted as a private in the First Missouri Cavalry Regiment and later was promoted to lieutenant. He was appointed by General Kearny, together with Col. Alexander Doniphan, to construct the code of civil laws known as the Kearny code in both English and Spanish for the territory annexed from Mexico. In October he accompanied the famous Mormon Battalion on its march to California, thereafter he returned to Missouri and assumed his seat in Congress.

Hall was elected as a Democrat to the Thirtieth, Thirty-first, and Thirty-second Congresses, serving from March 4, 1847, to March 3, 1853. During his Congressional service he was the chairman of the Committee on Private Land Claims (Thirty-first Congress), and of the Committee on Public Lands (Thirty-second Congress).

He moved to St. Joseph, Missouri in 1854 and continued practicing law. He was an unsuccessful candidate for the United States Senate in 1856.

== Civil War ==
In 1861 Hall was a member of the constitutional convention, which affirmed the policy of armed neutrality put forth by outgoing governor Robert Marcellus Stewart: that Missouri would remain in the Union but would not send troops or supplies to either side.

Governor Claiborne Jackson and lieutenant governor Thomas C. Reynolds refused the call from President Abraham Lincoln for troops to put down secession, and conspired with the Confederacy. Union General Nathaniel Lyon seized the state capital and deposed Jackson. The constitutional convention reconvened, minus pro-Southern delegates, and declared the office of governor and lieutenant governor vacant.

Hamilton Rowan Gamble was named provisional governor and Hall made lieutenant governor.

Hall also became a brigadier general in the Missouri Militia, as formed under Union control. He commanded the northwestern Missouri district until 1863.

Hall succeeded Gamble as governor when Gamble died in 1864.

== Later years ==
After leaving his unelected office at the war's end, Hall resumed his law practice in St. Joseph. He died there in 1882 and was buried in Mount Mora Cemetery.

U.S. House of Representatives
Preceded by None (new district)	Member of the U.S. House of Representatives from Missouri's 4th congressional district 1847–1853	Succeeded by Mordecai Oliver
Political offices
Preceded by Thomas Caute Reynolds	Lieutenant Governor of Missouri; 1861–1864	Succeeded by George Smith
Preceded by Hamilton Rowan Gamble	Governor of Missouri; 1864–1865	Succeeded by Thomas Clement Fletcher
