= Price–Harney Truce =

1861 American Civil War truce in MIssouri

The Price–Harney Truce was a document signed on May 21, 1861, between United States Army General William S. Harney (Commander of the U.S. Army's Western Department) and Missouri State Guard commander Sterling Price at the beginning of the American Civil War.

The truce sought to forestall the outbreak of violence in the state of Missouri following the Camp Jackson Affair, in which Union army troops under the command of Captain Nathaniel Lyon had captured Missouri State Militia mustered on the outskirts of St. Louis. While Lyon marched the captured militia to the St. Louis Arsenal through a crowd, a civilian riot ensued. The soldiers fired into the crowd and killed several people. In the aftermath of the riot, the Missouri State Legislature enacted the governor's "Military Bill" replacing the Missouri State Militia with a new Missouri State Guard. The governor appointed Sterling Price major general and commander of the State Guard.

General Harney had been away from St. Louis during the Camp Jackson affair. Upon his return, he met with Price to sign a joint statement "for the purpose of removing misapprehensions and allaying public excitement," its object being "that of restoring peace and good order to the people of the State in subordination to the laws of the General and State Governments." OR, SI, VIII, p.375. Harney-Price Truce

The Price–Harney Truce made federal forces responsible for order in the St. Louis area, and state forces responsible for order in the rest of the state. Under the terms of the truce, as understood by Harney, the agreement obligated the Missouri State Guard to protect Unionist Missourians from harassment and to hold the state for the Union. Harney also informed Price that several clauses in Missouri's recently enacted "Military Bill" would have to be modified to remove potential conflicts with the federal government's legal authority.

The truce drew the immediate ire of a wide variety of Missouri Unionists (including the politically powerful Congressman Frank Blair), who lobbied President Lincoln and the War Department to have Harney relieved of command. In the face of reports of abuses against Missouri Unionists, and continued negotiations between Governor Jackson and the Confederate Government, Lincoln approved Harney's replacement as commander of the Western District by newly promoted Brigadier General Nathaniel Lyon. The change of command took place on May 30. Whereas Harney was recognized as a legalistic and cautious Unionist, Lyon was an outspoken Abolitionist, with a long-standing relationship with several militant Missouri Unionist organizations. Lyon's elevation effectively ended the truce with Price.

On June 11 Missouri Governor Claiborne Fox Jackson held a last-ditch meeting at the Planter's House Hotel in St. Louis to delay open conflict in the State. Jackson was an open Confederate sympathizer and Price had been a conditional Unionist until the Camp Jackson Affair. During the meeting, Lyon angrily refused Price's requests to limit federal forces to the metropolitan St. Louis area, and to disband "Home Guard" companies established by Missouri Unionists. Lyon refused to accept any limitations on his military actions in the state, and eventually halted the meeting, informing Governor Jackson and MG Price that such limitations on federal authority "means war". Price and Jackson returned to the State Capitol at Jefferson City, and worked to concentrate State Guard forces in anticipation of open warfare with Unionist forces. Three days later Lyon landed troops at the state capital from steamboats and occupied the city without a shot fired. Lyon's mixed force of volunteers and Regulars subsequently routed the State Guard at the June 17, 1861 Battle of Boonville which gave Unionist forces control of Jefferson City, the Missouri River line and the strategic North Missouri Railroad.

In the absence of Governor Jackson, who had fled to the southern part of the state with the Guardsmen, the State Constitutional Convention called itself into session, declared the office of governor vacant, and appointed Hamilton Gamble, former state chief justice, as governor of the Provisional Government of Missouri. Gamble served from 1861 to 1864, when he died in office.

== See also ==
- Missouri Secession
