= Missouri State Guard =

Military force of the U.S. state of Missouri from 1861 to 1865

- State flag (Confederate)
- Active: 1861–1865
- Disbanded: May 11, 1865 (Note: On this date, Missouri Brig. Gen. M. Jeff Thompson surrendered the State Guard’s forces in Arkansas to Lieut. Col. Charles W. Davis, assistant provost marshal general for Maj. Gen. Grenville M. Dodge.)
- Country: Confederate States
- Allegiance: Missouri
- Type: State Guard
- Size: 23,000–28,000 (1861)
- Engagements: American Civil War: Battle of Boonville; Battle of Cole Camp; Battle of Carthage; Battle of Athens; Battle of Dug Springs; Battle of Wilson's Creek; Battle of Dry Wood Creek; Action at Blue Mills Landing; First Battle of Lexington; Battle of Fredericktown; First Battle of Springfield; Skirmish at Blackwater Creek; Skirmish at Island Mound; Battle of Roan's Tan Yard; Battle of Pea Ridge; Price's Missouri Expedition

Commanders
- Commander in Chief: 1861–1862 Claiborne F. Jackson; 1862–1865 Thomas C. Reynolds
- Major-General: Maj. Gen. Sterling Price
- Adjutant-General: Brig. Gen. Warwick Hough

The Missouri State Guard (MSG) was a military force established by the Missouri General Assembly on May 11, 1861. While not a formation of the Confederate States Army, the Missouri State Guard fought alongside Confederate troops and, at various times, served under Confederate officers.

== Background ==
The Missouri General Assembly passed the "Military Bill" on May 11, 1861, in direct response to the Camp Jackson Affair in St. Louis the previous day. The final version of the act approved on May 14 authorized the Governor of Missouri, Claiborne Fox Jackson, to disband the old Missouri Volunteer Militia and reform it as the Missouri State Guard to resist a feared invasion by the Union Army. It also outlawed or prohibited other militia organizations except those authorized by the Guard's district commanders. This was primarily aimed at preventing Unionist Missourians from organizing "Home Guard" companies in the areas outside the metropolitan St. Louis area. This prohibition included the predominantly unionist German United States Reserve Corps regiments mustered in St. Louis in excess of the Missouri requirement under the Federal Militia Act of 1792. The law did allow for formation of new local Home Guards under the auspices of the MSG, but these were limited to 14–17 and 45+ year olds. It also specified that the language of all spoken commands was to be English, a specification intended to exclude ethnic Germans, who were predominantly Unionist in their political orientation. The act divided the state into nine Military Districts based on the Federal Congressional Districts and made men ages 18 to 45 years of age eligible for MSG service unless exempted due to occupation, office or other reasons. While the act termed each district a "division", they were organized along brigade lines. The actual forces of a district consisted of all the regiments, not of brigades of these regiments. Each district's division was to be commanded by a brigadier general who was a resident of the district, and elected by the commissioned officers of the district. An act was passed on May 15 for the appointment of a major general to act as field commander; the first to be commissioned Major General was Sterling Price, the popular former governor and one of the most influential men in Missouri.

== History ==
Recruits for the Missouri State Guard began to quickly assemble in Jefferson City in mid-May. However, after an agreement, the Price–Harney Truce on May 20 between Price and the Federal department commander William S. Harney, the movement of Guardsmen to the state capitol was halted. The State Guard continued to be mobilized in their home districts. On May 30, Harney was relieved and Nathaniel Lyon took command of the department. On June 11, a meeting to resolve some disagreements resulted in the collapse of the truce. Price and Jackson fled St. Louis for Jefferson City. The next day Governor Jackson called for 50,000 volunteers to defend Missouri from the Union army; thousands of additional men answered the proclamation and enlisted in their respective districts/divisions.

The embryonic Missouri State Guard suffered a serious initial setback in a skirmish at Boonville on June 17 and began a retreat toward extreme southwestern Missouri. Two days later the Guard's path was cleared when a local MSG infantry and cavalry battalion under Lieutenant Colonel Walter S. O'Kane decisively defeated and captured the Benton County Home Guard at Cole Camp. Another victory on July 5 at the Battle of Carthage bought time for Price to begin training and organizing his raw recruits, many of whom had reported for military duty carrying only farm implements or antiquated hunting weapons. MSG organization and training was conducted at Cowskin Prairie, a former livestock auction site in southwest Missouri. A key figure in efforts to impose order on the embryonic organization was Adjutant General Lewis Henry Little, a native of Maryland and career Army officer.

Price, along with Confederate regulars and members of the Arkansas State Troops, defeated a smaller Union force under Nathaniel Lyon at Wilson's Creek on August 10, killing Lyon and driving back his army. Price, with 10,000 men, defeated a 600-man battalion of Kansas volunteer cavalry led by Senator James Lane at Big Dry Wood Creek on September 1–2, and then besieged and captured 3,600 Federal troops in the First Battle of Lexington (Battle of the Hemp Bales) in mid-month. As Frémont's Union army finally advanced toward Springfield, the Guard withdrew. A bold dash by Major Charles Zagonyi's mounted vanguard routed local MSG troops waiting in ambush on October 25, 1861, at the First Battle of Springfield. Fremont's offensive was subsequently recalled before engaging the main southern force when Fremont was relieved from command by order of President Lincoln.

Shortly afterwards, a session of exiled elements of the Missouri legislature convened in the southwest Missouri town of Neosho and claimed to have passed an Ordinance of Secession on October 30, with the Governor-in-Exile Jackson signing on October 31, 1861. While the vote was not endorsed by a statewide plebiscite, the Confederate Congress officially admitted Missouri as the 12th Confederate State on November 28, 1861.

While in winter camp, Price began enrolling many of his men into the regular Confederate service. Two brigades of the MSG participated in the Battle of Pea Ridge (Elkhorn Tavern), where Brig. Gen. William Y. Slack, the former commander of the 4th Division, was mortally wounded.

On March 17, 1862, Price merged the Missouri State Guard into the Confederate Army of the West. Later, former Missouri State Guard troops would make up the core of the Army of Missouri, which participated in Price's Missouri Expedition in 1864 in an attempt to capture the state. A small number of Guard units remained independent until the end of the war in 1865, seeing action in several engagements in the Trans-Mississippi Theater under generals Mosby M. Parsons and James S. Rains.

== Strength ==
In 2007, the foremost authorities on the Missouri State Guard estimated that at least 34,000 and probably close to 40,000 Missourians served in the Guard at one point or another. The Guard's strength peaked at about 23,000 to 28,000 in September 1861 with about 5,000 in Southeast Missouri in M. Jeff Thompson's First Division operating independently of the main body surrounding Price near Lexington.

== Divisions ==
A map of the divisions of the Missouri State Guard, based on modern (2023) county boundaries

The Guard's divisions were based on congressional districts and composed of the following counties: (Commanders are listed in parentheses)

- First District/First Division: St Francois, Ste. Genevieve, Perry, Cape Girardeau, Bollinger, Madison, Iron, Wayne, Stoddard, Scott, Mississippi, New Madrid, Butler, Dunklin, and Pemiscot. (Nathaniel W. Watkins, M. Jeff Thompson)
- Second District/Second Division: Scotland, Clark, Knox, Lewis, Shelby, Marion, Monroe, Ralls, Pike, Audrain, Callaway, Montgomery, Lincoln, Warren, and St. Charles. (Thomas A. Harris, Martin E. Green)
- Third District/Third Division: Putnam, Schuyler, Sullivan, Adair, Linn, Macon, Chariton, Randolph, Howard, and Boone. (John B. Clark, Sr.)
- Fourth District/Fourth Division: Gentry, Harrison, Mercer, Grundy, De Kalb, Daviess, Livingston, Clinton, Caldwell, Ray, Carroll, and Worth. (William Y. Slack)
- Fifth District/Fifth Division: Atchison, Nodaway, Holt, Andrew, Buchanan, Platte, and Clay. (Alexander E. Steen, Col. James P. Saunders)
- Sixth District/Sixth Division: Saline, Pettis, Cooper, Moniteau, Cole, Osage, Gasconade, Maries, Miller, Morgan, Camden, Pulaski, and Phelps. (Mosby Parsons)
- Seventh District/Seventh Division: Dallas, Laclede, Texas, Dent, Reynolds, Shannon, Wright, Webster, Greene, Christian, Stone, Taney, Douglas, Ozark, Howell, Oregon, Carter, and Ripley. (James H. McBride)
- Eighth District/Eighth Division: Jackson, Lafayette, Cass, Johnson, Bates, Henry, Benton, Hickory, Polk, St. Clair, Vernon, Cedar, Dade, Barton, Jasper, Lawrence, Newton, McDonald, and Barry. (James S. Rains)
- Ninth District/Ninth Division: St. Louis, Washington, Franklin, Jefferson, and Crawford. (Never formally organized following the Camp Jackson Affair, units served with other commands.) (Meriwether Lewis Clark, Sr., Daniel M. Frost)

== State flag ==
Missouri did not have an official flag until Major-General Sterling Price, commander of the Missouri State Guard, ordered on June 5, 1861:

Each regiment will adopt the State flag, made of blue merino, 6 by 5 feet, with the Missouri coat-of-arms in gold gilt on each side. Each mounted company will have a guidon, the flag of which will be of white merino, 3 by 2 1/2 feet, with the letters M. S. G. in gilt on each side. The length of the pike for colors and guidons will be nine feet long, including spear and ferule. Each company of infantry will have one drum and one fife. Each company of mounted men will have two bugles or trumpets. If the colors, guidons, drums, fifes, and bugles cannot be procured in the district requisitions will be made on the quartermaster-general of the State.

== See also ==
- Army of the West
- List of Missouri Confederate Civil War units
- Missouri in the American Civil War
