= William S. Harney =

United States Army general (1800–1889)

William Selby Harney
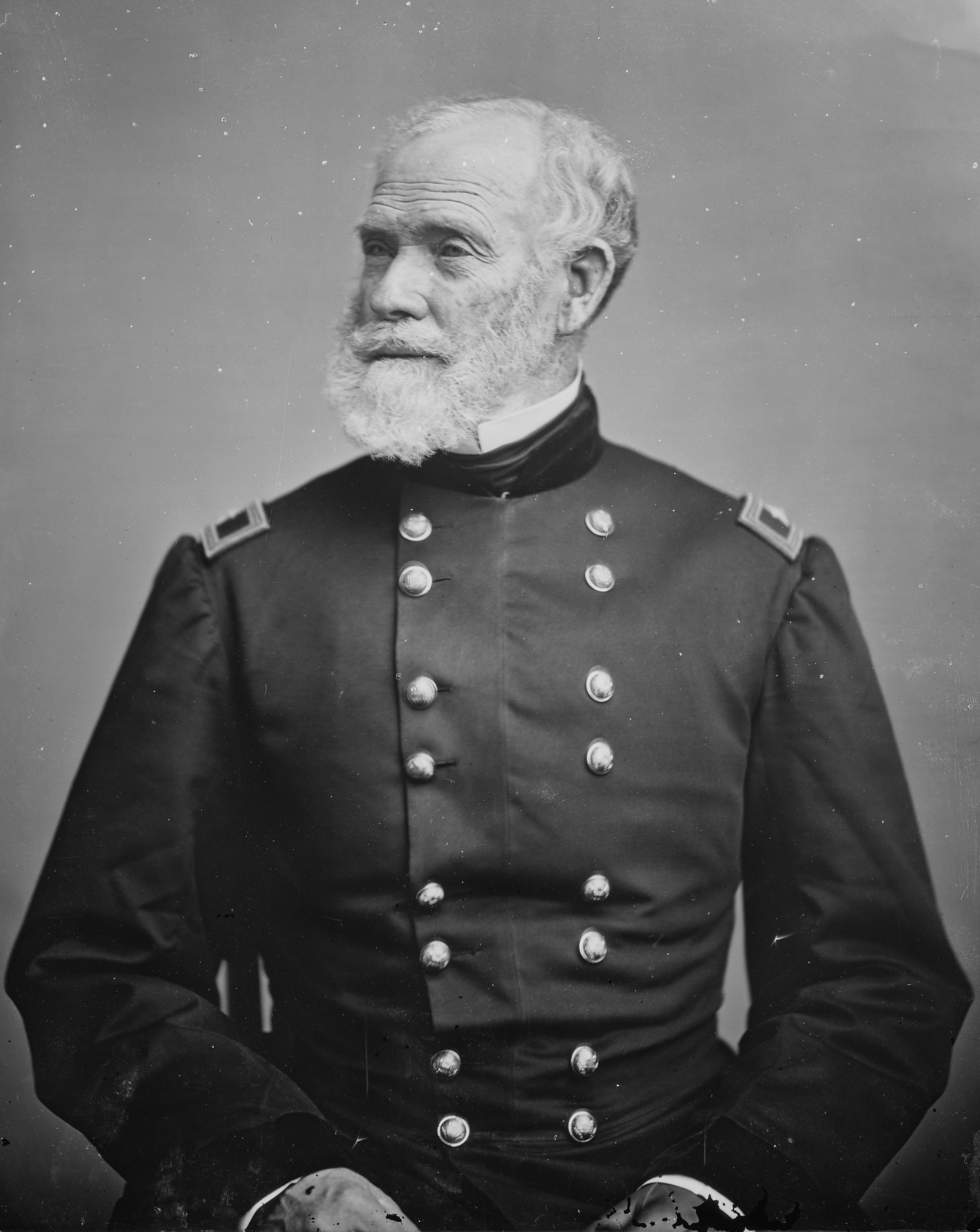
- Bvt. Maj. Gen. William S. Harney
- Born: August 22, 1800; Madison, Tennessee, U.S.
- Died: May 9, 1889 (aged 88); Orlando, Florida, U.S.
- Burial place: Arlington National Cemetery
- Military career
- Allegiance: United States; Union
- Branch: United States Army; Union Army
- Service years: 1818–1863
- Rank: Brigadier General; Brevet Major General
- Unit: 1st U.S. Infantry
- Commands: 2nd U.S. Dragoons; Military Department Number Five; Department of Oregon; Department of the West
- Conflicts: American Indian Wars; Seminole Wars; Black Hawk War; Sioux Wars; Mexican–American War; Pig War; Utah War; Bleeding Kansas; American Civil War

William Selby Harney (August 22, 1800 – May 9, 1889), otherwise known among the Lakota as "Woman Killer" and "Mad Bear," was an American cavalry officer in the US Army, who became known during the Indian Wars and the Mexican–American War for his brutality and ruthlessness. During his service, Harney commanded key frontier military operations in Florida, Texas, and the northern Great Plains, his aggressive actions in the Pacific Northwest also nearly sparked a potential war with the United Kingdom.

One of five general officers (including Winfield Scott, David Twiggs, John Wool, and Joseph E. Johnston) in the US Army at the beginning of the American Civil War, he was removed from overseeing the Department of the West because of his Southern sympathies early in the war, although he kept Missouri from joining the Confederacy. Under President Andrew Johnson, he served on the Indian Peace Commission, negotiating in several treaties before spending his retirement partly in Missouri and partly trading reminiscences with Jefferson Davis and Ulysses S. Grant in Mississippi, eventually moving to Florida afterwards, where he spent the last few years of his life.

== Early life ==
William S. Harney was born on August 27, 1800, in Haysborough (Haysboro), a community on the Cumberland River (then a few miles above Nashville, Tennessee, now incorporated in the city), Harney attended a local private academy. His father Thomas Harney had been an army officer.

== Early military career ==
In 1817, Harney's brother, Dr. Benjamin F. Harney, an Army surgeon in Baton Rouge, Louisiana, asked Andrew Jackson, a hero of the War of 1812 and the current commander of the Army of the South, to write a letter to the Secretary of the Navy to ask for Harney's acceptance into the Navy, which occurred July 23, 1817. Harney visited his brother and met high-ranking military officers. He so impressed them that they arranged a commission for him as a U.S. Navy second lieutenant, which President James Monroe signed. However, Harney chose to serve under Jackson in the army. His first military assignment under Jackson was in 1818, as a second lieutenant in the 1st U.S. Infantry. He helped to force the pirate Jean Lafitte to move his operations from the Louisiana Territory to the Spanish Main.

Harney began his many years of interactions with American Indians on the Great Plains in 1825, when he accompanied Colonel Henry Atkinson and Benjamin O'Fallon on an expedition to sign treaties with the Upper Missouri tribes. In 1832, Harney fought in the Black Hawk War against the Sauk and Fox tribes, serving as General Zachary Taylor's assistant inspector. There he met, fought, and befriended Jefferson Davis, Taylor's son-in-law and a fellow army officer.

=== Murder of Hannah ===
In June 1834, while he was a major in the Paymaster Corps at the Jefferson Barracks in St. Louis, Missouri, Harney was charged with beating an enslaved woman named Hannah to death. Upset by the loss of keys to his office, Harney suspected Hannah of having stolen them. In a fit of anger, he fiercely beat her with a piece of rawhide. Hannah died from her injuries three days later. Harney then fled to avoid arrest, meanwhile seeking formal transfer to another state by the army. The coroner ruled that Hannah died as a result of Harney's violent actions, and he was indicted for murder by a grand jury in July. The trial was moved to Union, Missouri, and scheduled for the spring of 1835. Overseen by a judge with "a reputation in which Harney could take comfort" (according to biographer George Rollie Adams), fifteen witnesses spoke in court, their testimony going unrecorded, and Harney, "although clearly responsible for Hannah's death," was acquitted.

This was not the only instance of Harney brutalizing slaves. He owned a group of muscular male slaves whom he enjoyed provoking into fistfights with soldiers.

=== Second Seminole War ===
During the Second Seminole War (1835–1842), Harney gained a reputation as an Indian fighter for his daring and ruthless raids. Harney and troops under his command often fought the Seminole war leader and mystic Sam Jones, also known as Abiaka. Harney first fought against Abiaka in January 1838 at the Second Battle of the Loxahatchee. In July 1839, Abiaka's warriors attacked Harney and his soldiers at the Battle of the Caloosahatchee.

=== Mexican–American War ===
During the Mexican–American War, Harney was appointed colonel and commanded the 2nd Dragoons. They were attached to John E. Wool's command during the Chihuahua Expedition and the Battle of Buena Vista. Harney joined Winfield Scott's army as senior cavalry officer at the siege of Veracruz. However, Harney's headstrong and insubordinate temperament caused losses and embarrassment. So when Harney refused to leave Monterrey, despite orders to do so, he was replaced by Major Edwin V. Sumner, and Brevet Major General William J. Worth placed Harney under court-martial, and Harney was ultimately convicted. However, President James K. Polk overrode Scott's judgment to remove Harney from command and concluded that Harney's only fault was being in the Democratic Party. The incident damaged the relationship between the general and Commander-in-Chief.

Placed in temporary command of the 1st Brigade in David Twiggs's division, Harney fought with distinction at the Battle of Cerro Gordo and received a promotion to brevet brigadier general. He returned to cavalry command during the Battle of Contreras, the Battle of Churubusco, and the Battles for Mexico City. However, he was accused of mistreatment of captured prisoners from the St. Patrick's Battalion, which included US Army deserters and escaped slaves.

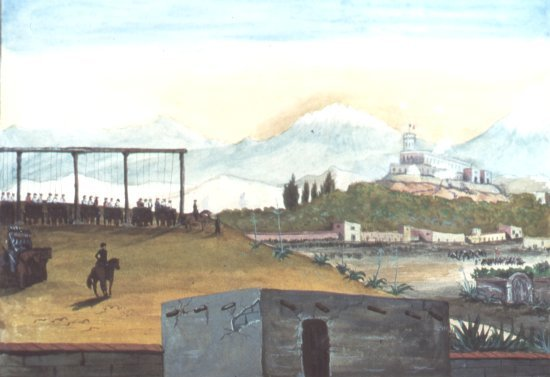
The mass hanging of San Patricios deserters, September 1847 (painting by Samuel Chamberlain)

By order of Gen. Winfield Scott, thirty San Patricios were to be executed at the Battle of Chapultepec in full view of the two armies, and at the precise moment that the flag of the U.S. replaced the flag of Mexico atop the citadel. Harney was ordered to carry out the execution but was taunted and jeered by the condemned men. One of the condemned, Francis O'Connor, was ordered by Harney to be hanged even though both his legs had been amputated the previous day. When the army surgeon informed Colonel Harney that the absent soldier had lost both his legs in battle, Harney was said to have replied: "Bring the damned son of a bitch out! My order was to hang 30 and by God I'll do it!" In the aftermath of the executions, it was reported that Harney refused to cut the bodies down, stating that "I was ordered to have them hanged, and have no orders to unhang them".

Harney became an original member of the Aztec Club of 1847, which was composed of American officers who had served in Mexico.

=== First Sioux War ===
On May 14, 1849, on the death of Brevet Major General William J. Worth, Harney assumed command of Military Department Number Five, which comprised almost all of the settled portion of Texas. He was assigned to control Indian raids, which led to the First Sioux War (discussed in part below), although Harney actually commanded Military Department No. 5 for only three short periods, having been replaced by Colonel George N. Brooke on July 7, 1849; after Brooke's death from March 9 until September 15, 1851, when he was replaced by Colonel Persifor N. Smith, and then from December 3, 1852, until he was again relieved by Smith on May 11, 1853.

Recalled from leave after he had attempted to visit his family in Paris in 1854, Harney led a punitive expedition against the Sioux after they killed a small US Army detachment in Nebraska Territory, an event called the Grattan massacre. He led attacks against the Brulé Lakota, who were involved in conflicts with immigrant travelers on the Oregon Trail. In the Battle of Ash Hollow, on September 2 and 3, 1855, Harney's troops routed Little Thunder's village at Blue Water Creek (now known as Ash Hollow), in western Nebraska, killing about half of the 250 band members. Among the victims were women and children who had hidden in a cave, into which cannons were fired under the pretense that they were warriors. Following this massacre the Sioux gave Harney the nicknames of “The Butcher” and “The Big Chief who Swears”. Harney earned a Lakota name translated as "Mad Bear" because after the attack, he marched across the Badlands to Fort Pierre, the largest trading post in Dakota Territory, and challenged the Lakotas to a winter fight. The success of the campaign encouraged Harney to suggest that mobile units might replace permanent army posts.

Harney briefly commanded troops during the Utah War and was again recalled and placed in command of troops sent to deal with the guerrilla warfare of Bleeding Kansas.

Next, he was assigned command of the Department of Oregon. Harney sent Captain George E. Pickett and troops to San Juan Island, precipitating the so-called Pig War of 1859 with British forces. The Army recalled Harney to St. Louis after the altercations with the British.

Promoted to brigadier general on June 14, 1858, Harney was, at 57, the youngest of the four general officers in the regular army at the time, (alongside the War of 1812 veterans Winfield Scott, John Wool, and David Twiggs, the next-youngest, at 70, because of the lack of a fixed retirement age).

== American Civil War ==
As the American Civil War began, Harney was still in command of the Army's Department of the West based at Jefferson Barracks in St. Louis, Missouri, and his wife's family was prominent in the area. General Twiggs accepted a Confederate commission to head the Department of Louisiana and was accordingly dismissed from the US Army and replaced by Edwin V. Sumner. Missouri Governor Claiborne Jackson was pro-secession, but the majority of Missourians favored the Union. After the bombardment of Fort Sumter, President Abraham Lincoln called for troops to suppress the rebellion. Jackson refused and began plotting with Confederate authorities to bring about Missouri's secession by a military coup.

On May 10, 1861, Captain Nathaniel Lyon, commander of the St. Louis Arsenal, led a force of unofficial Unionist "Home Guards" to capture a force of state militia that were poised to seize the Arsenal by acting without any authorization from Harney, his superior. The Camp Jackson Affair resulted in a bloody riot in St. Louis, which horrified Harney.

The state legislature responded by reorganizing the militia as the Missouri State Guard and authorizing it to resist an invasion by federal troops. Harney tried to calm the situation and agreed to the Price–Harney Truce with Guard Commander Sterling Price, who was married to Harney's wife's niece. They agreed that the State Guard would control most of Missouri while federal troops stayed near St. Louis. The deal also involved Missouri Governor Claiborne Jackson, who was pro-secession and declared Missouri as seceding from the Union on August 5, 1861, despite the majority of the citizens of Missouri being pro-Union, resulting in Jackson being impeached by the people and replaced by a provisional governor, as was the lieutenant governor, secretary of state and some of the legislature. Despite the majority of the population being pro-Union, the Confederacy admitted Missouri as state, this resulted in Jackson and the southern sympathizing members of the state government being forced to flee south to Arkansas, where they lead a government-in-exile.

That was not acceptable to Unionist leaders in Missouri, including the Republican leader Francis Preston Blair Jr., since Price did nothing to prevent the organization of pro-Confederate forces or to protect Unionists in his territory. Worsening matters was Harney's Tennessee heritage, which made his loyalty to the Union suspect. Blair reported all to the Lincoln administration in Washington, DC, and was authorized to replace Harney with Lyon, which Blair did on 30 May.

Recalled to Washington to discuss the situation, Harney was captured by Confederates at Harper's Ferry on April 25, 1861. He was offered a command by Confederate General Robert E. Lee but turned down the offer. However, because he was a Tennessean, his captors released him and allowed him to continue on to Washington.

Harney remained in Washington and served in various administrative positions. When it became clear that he would not receive another field command, he retired in 1863 and lived in St. Louis. In recognition of his long and distinguished career, he was awarded and breveted to major general in 1865.

== Later years ==
President Andrew Johnson appointed Harney to the Indian Peace Commission and so he returned to the Great Plains in 1865 and 1867 to negotiate treaties. In part because Harney urged the US Congress to honor past treaties. He helped secure the Little Arkansas Treaty with the Comanche and Kiowa in 1865, the Medicine Lodge Treaty in 1867 and the Fort Laramie Treaty with the Brule Sioux in 1868. In 1868, Harney established three Sioux agencies on the Missouri River, which he did at Whetstone Creek, Cheyenne River, and Grand River.

Harney then retired to Pass Christian, Mississippi, on the Gulf Coast and often reminisced with his old friend Jefferson Davis about their old service at Fort Crawford, including their near duel; they forgot their opposite service during the American Civil War. After Davis's death, Harney moved to the Orlando, Florida area, where he died.

== Personal life ==
In 1833, in St. Louis, he married Mary Mullanphy, daughter of John Mullanphy, an Irish immigrant who became a wealthy merchant in Baltimore and St. Louis' first millionaire. Harney converted to Catholicism, and they had three children including John Mullanphy Harney (1847–1905). However, Harney only saw his wife twice after 1850, and she would relocate to France with their children in 1853, where she died in 1860. Her children would return to St. Louis, and their granddaughter Marie Antoinette Harney Beauregard (1868–1940) would marry the son of Confederate general Pierre Beauregard. In 1884, Harney married Mary St. Cyr (1826–1907).

== Death ==
Harney died at his home near Orlando, Florida, in 1889, just months after Harney County, Oregon was named for him. He was interred at Arlington National Cemetery, as would be his widow in 1907. His will, witnessed by Ulysses S. Grant and filed in St. Louis, gave his son "John Hearney" and daughter "Eliza Hearney" $5 each, and the rest of his property, wherever located, to his widow. Harney represented an individualist standing apart, in an age of rough dichotomies. The one-time renowned "Indian Fighter" had also served on an Indian Peace Commission due to his familiarity with native people. The appointment was made not due to his advocacy of Indians, but rather because he had been one of the few men to successfully wage war against them and was someone who could gain their attention.

Harney was known among the Sioux as "Woman Killer" due to his actions (known as the "Harney Massacre") at an Indian village in 1855 at Blue Water Creek, south of the Black Hills: "While engaged in a delaying parley with Chief Little Thunder" Harney's troops "circled undetected" toward the village, "where the infantry opened fire and forced the Indians toward mounted soldiers, who inflicted terrible casualties. Initial reports stated 86 Indians were killed and 70 women and children were captured; however, the totals were later determined to be higher as additional casualties were found in the following days. The Indians tipis were looted and burned by Harney’s troops.

== Legacy and honors ==
=== Historic site ===
The Maj. Gen. William S. Harney Summer Home in Sullivan, Crawford County, Missouri, is privately owned by the Harney Mansion Foundation. The Sullivan Chamber of Commerce cooperates with the foundation and can arrange visits to the home, which is listed on the National Register of Historic Places.

=== Places named for Harney ===
- Harney Park, Portland, Oregon
- Harney Channel, waterway between Orcas and Shaw Islands in the San Juan archipelago (renamed Cayou Channel in July 2022)
- Harney, Nevada
- Harney County, Oregon
- Harney Lake in Oregon
- Harney Street in Omaha, NE
- Harney Peak in South Dakota (Later renamed Black Elk Peak in August 2016)
- Harney Point in Cape Coral, Florida
- Lake Harney in central Florida
- Harney Sports Complex at Fort Leavenworth, Kansas
- Harney River located in Everglades National Park
