= Claiborne Fox Jackson =

American politician (1806–1862)

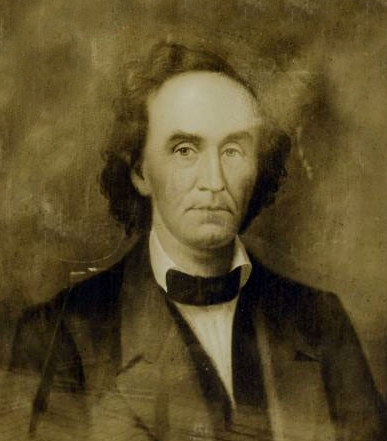

15th Governor of Missouri
- In office January 3, 1861 – July 31, 1861; In exile July 31, 1861 – December 6, 1862
- Lieutenant: Thomas C. Reynolds
- Preceded by: Robert M. Stewart
- Succeeded by: Hamilton R. Gamble (in Missouri); Thomas C. Reynolds (in exile)

Member of the Missouri Senate
- In office 1848–1852

Member of the Missouri House of Representatives from Saline County
- In office 1836–1848

Personal details
- Born: April 4, 1806 Fleming County, Kentucky, U.S.
- Died: December 6, 1862 (aged 56) Little Rock, Arkansas, U.S.
- Cause of death: Pneumonia
- Resting place: Sappington Cemetery State Historic Site; 39°01′58″N 93°00′27″W
- Party: Democratic
- Spouses: Jane Breathhitt Sappington (m. 1831; died 1831); Louisa Catherine Sappington (m. 1833; died 1838); Elza Sappington (m. 1838–1862)

Military service
- Allegiance: United States
- Branch/service: United States Volunteers
- Years of service: 1832
- Rank: Captain
- Battles/wars: American Indian Wars: Black Hawk War

Claiborne Fox Jackson (April 4, 1806 – December 6, 1862) was an American politician of the Democratic Party in Missouri. He was elected as the 15th governor of Missouri, serving from January 3, 1861, until July 31, 1861, when he was forced out by the Unionist majority in the Missouri General Assembly after planning to force the secession of the state.

Before the war, Jackson worked with his father-in-law, John Sappington, to manufacture and sell patent medicines, in the form of quinine pills, to treat and prevent malaria.

He became quite wealthy and politically influential, deeply involved in the Democratic party in Saline County and central Missouri. He served twelve years in the Missouri House of Representatives, twice as Speaker. In 1848 he was elected to the State Senate. During the 1860 election, Jackson professed to be a Unionist. However, in 1861, after the Missouri Convention rejected secession, Jackson secretly planned a secessionist coup in league with the Confederate government.

In 1860 Jackson successfully ran for governor as a moderate on the issue of secession. During his inaugural speech of January 3, 1861, however, he declared that Missouri would resist any Union coercion by force of arms. He then called for a convention to pass a secession ordinance, but that body, dominated by Unionists, defeated the measure. After the fall of Fort Sumter, South Carolina, in April 1861, Jackson denounced President Abraham Lincoln's call for volunteers and began plotting to seize the U.S. Arsenal in St. Louis. To that end he dispatched secret emissaries to Confederate president Jefferson Davis and received four large cannon.

But Jackson's scheme was defeated by the prompt actions of Cap. Nathaniel Lyon, who attacked and scattered Jackson's “State Guard” at Camp Jackson on May 10, 1861. Jackson fled the state capital, Jefferson City, as Lyon's forces approached and established a rump legislature at Neosho; this body formally voted to secede the following October. However, continuing Union successes under Gen. Samuel R. Curtis sent the secessionist governor and his followers fleeing again, this time into Arkansas, where they erected a temporary capital at Camden.

Jackson died of pneumonia, resulting from complications from stomach cancer on December 7, 1862, in Little Rock, Arkansas.

He was replaced by Lieutenant Governor Thomas C. Reynolds.

The exile government continued, setting up shop in Shreveport, Louisiana and then Marshall, Texas. The government took part in and sent representatives to the Confederate government. The exile government was formally disbanded at the conclusion of the Civil War.

== Early life ==
Claiborne Fox Jackson, son of Dempsey Carroll and Mary Orea "Molly" (née Pickett) Jackson, was born in 1806 in Fleming County, Kentucky. He had several older brothers. His father, Dempsey Carroll Jackson, was a wealthy tobacco planter and slaveholder. He was likely tutored at home and taught to be a planter. Claiborne Fox's second cousin was John Jackson and his third cousin was Jarvis Jackson Jr, father and brother of Hancock Lee Jackson (respectively). Hancock Lee Jackson, the 13th governor of Missouri, was also Claiborne Fox Jackson's 3rd cousin. The two shared a great-grandfather, Joseph Jackson Sr. John and Jarvis Jr. later sold the land that would become Laurel County, Kentucky.

== Migration to Missouri – career and marriages ==
In 1826 Jackson moved with several of his older brothers to Missouri, settling in the Howard County town of Franklin. The Jackson brothers established a successful general mercantile store.

In early 1831, Jackson married Jane Breathitt Sappington, daughter of Dr. John Sappington, a prominent frontier physician, and his wife, Jane, in Arrow Rock, Missouri. From Maryland and Nashville, Tennessee, Sappington had met his wife in Kentucky. She was a sister of future Kentucky Governor John Breathitt and two other politically connected brothers. After living in Franklin, Tennessee, they migrated to Missouri in 1817, settling in Arrow Rock a couple of years later. In addition to developing businesses, Sappington eventually acquired thousands of acres of land and became a major slaveholder.

But Jane Jackson died a few months after the wedding. That year her father established the Sappington Cemetery on his plantation for family burials, perhaps because of his daughter Jane's death.

Claiborne Jackson continued to work with his brothers after his wife's death, until 1832 and the outbreak of hostilities in the Black Hawk War. As a young widower, Claiborne Jackson organized, and was elected captain of, a unit of Howard County volunteers for the conflict.

After returning from the war, Jackson decided to make a change, moving to nearby Saline County, where his father-in-law lived. He worked for him for a time in the family businesses. This was also part of the region along the Missouri River known as "Little Dixie."

In 1833 Jackson married Louisa Catherine Sappington, a younger sister of his late wife. He worked with his father-in-law and brother-in-law Erasmus Sappington in the manufacture and sale of "Dr. Sappington's Anti-Fever Pills", a patent medicine preventative and treatment for malaria. The pills were filled with quinine, which Sappington manufactured from ground cinchona bark imported from Peru. He developed wide distribution of the pills, which became best sellers. Malaria was prevalent throughout the Missouri and Mississippi valleys, as were yellow fever, scarlet fever, and influenza. Saline County was relatively near the head of the Santa Fe Trail in neighboring Howard County. Traders and emigrants traveling through the area were also eager to buy pills to treat malaria.

Subsequently, both men and their entwined, extended families became quite wealthy and influential in the region. In May 1838, Jackson's second wife, Louisa, died, likely from complications of childbirth. Their infant son, Andrew Jackson, died the next month. That same year Jackson married again, to the widowed Elizabeth (Eliza) Whitsett (Sappington) Pearson, also a daughter of his parents-in-law. They had two daughters together, Louisa Jane (1841–1918) and Annie E. Jackson (1844–1926).

== Political career ==
Through his family connections with Dr. Sappington, Jackson, along with his brother-in-law Meredith M. Marmaduke, became deeply involved with Missouri Democratic Party politics. Jackson was first elected in 1836 to the Missouri House of Representatives, where he represented Saline County.

He moved to the Howard County seat of Fayette, Missouri—then a center of political power in the state—in 1838 and worked for the local branch of the state bank. This would pay great political dividends later in his career. Claiborne Jackson served a total of twelve years in the Missouri House, including terms as Speaker in 1844 and 1846.

In 1840 Jackson nearly became involved in a duel over politics; duels had been prohibited. Writing anonymously to a Fayette, Missouri newspaper, Jackson made accusations that John B. Clark, the Whig candidate for Missouri Governor that year, was guilty of election fraud. The men exchanged more harsh words, and Clark challenged Jackson to a duel. The matter was settled without gunplay. Later, after Clark had switched party allegiance to the Democrats, he and Jackson became political allies.

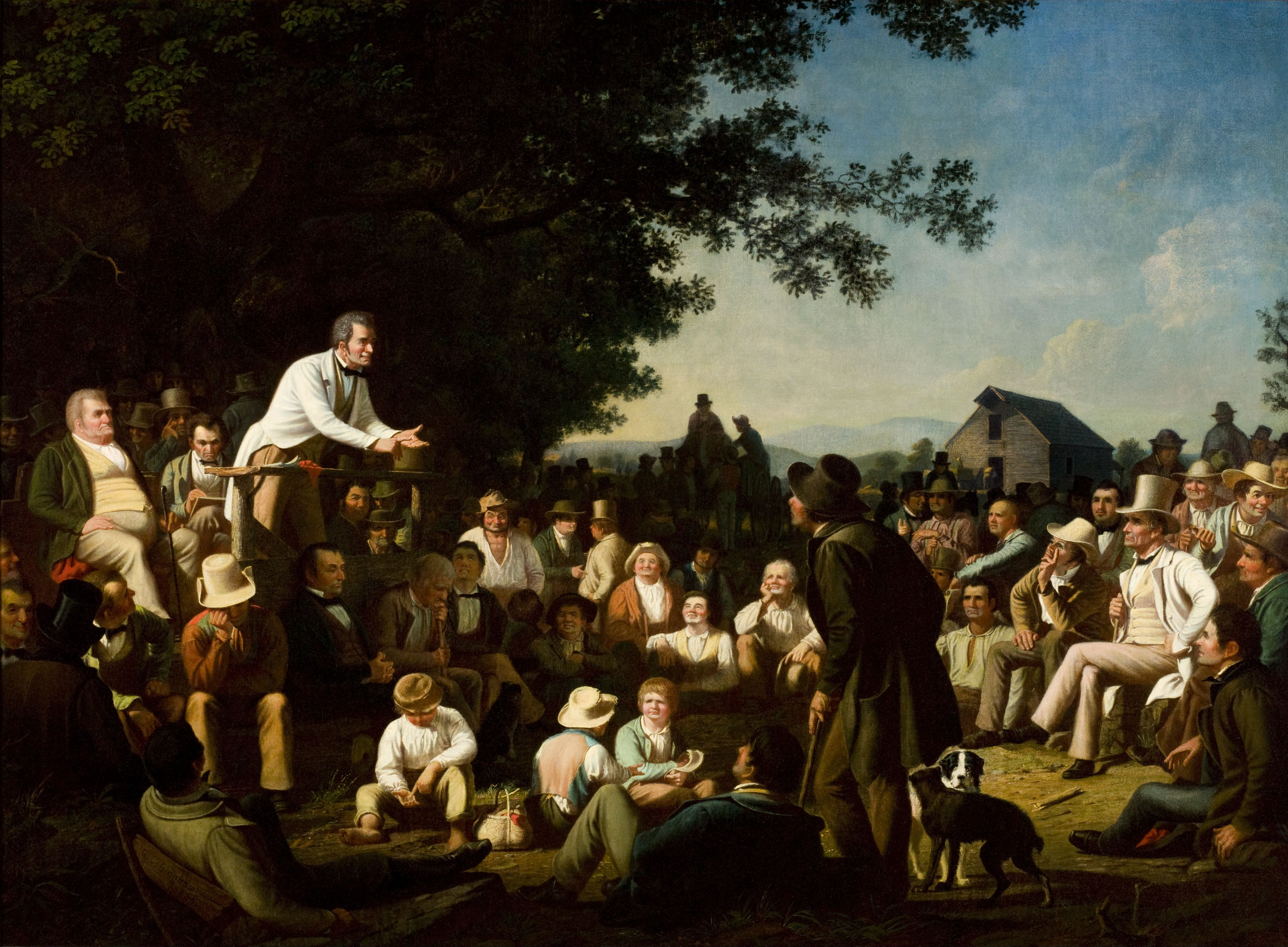
Stump Speaking, 1853–54 by George Caleb Bingham; the outstanding citizen sitting at right opposite the Stump Orator is Claiborn Fox Jackson while the Stump Orator is his nephew by marriage Erasmus D Sappington

Jackson was elected to the state senate in 1848. As leader of the pro-slavery Democrats, he headed efforts to defeat US Senator Thomas H. Benton, a powerful politician who was pro-Union. This was an event with both personal and political implications for Jackson, as his father-in-law and Benton had a longtime friendship. Until that time, like his father-in-law and brother-in-law Marmaduke, Jackson had been an ardent backer of Benton.

Marmaduke chose to side with Benton, as his views on slavery and related issues had changed since the 1840s. This likely cost him the chance to be elected governor in his own right (he had served ten months in the role to fill the term following the suicide of Thomas Reynolds.) The estrangement with Jackson and his other in-laws led to disruption in the extended family.

Amidst increasing tensions related to slavery in the state and nation, Missouri State Senator and Judge Carty Wells of Marion County introduced what were first known as the Calhoun resolutions, developed by US Senator John C. Calhoun (D-SC) for all slaveholding states. These were referred to the committee on foreign relations, which Jackson chaired. He is credited with introducing them to the whole state senate on January 15, 1849. They were afterward known as the "Jackson Resolutions." Asserting that Congress had no constitutional right to legislate on slavery in the states, the resolutions rejected the Missouri Compromise and any effort by outside forces to determine slavery in a territory, but said to preserve harmony it would accept extension of the Compromise to all new territories. It stated that Missouri had much in common with other slaveholding states and needed to resist Northern encroachment. It mandated that the state's U.S. Senators and Congressmen support these resolutions. US Senator Thomas Hart Benton had rejected Calhoun's resolutions in the Senate and strongly opposed the effort to introduce them at the state. But Jackson and the anti-Benton faction had their way. The joint convention of the legislature to vote for US Senator (as was the custom at the time) voted for Whig Henry S. Geyer, and Benton lost his office. Benton supporters retaliated by derailing Jackson's attempts to secure the Democratic nomination for U.S. Congress in 1853 and again in 1855.

In 1857, Jackson was appointed by the governor as Banking Commissioner of Missouri. In that position he established a system of six State Banks, with branch locations. This proved an advantage to business and the general public alike by stabilizing temporary currency shortages that had happened from time to time, especially in the more rural areas of the state. As Commissioner, Jackson traveled to various locations around the state inspecting banking facilities. He used these occasions to build a power base for his next attempt at elected office, as a candidate for Governor of Missouri.

=== Governor of Missouri ===
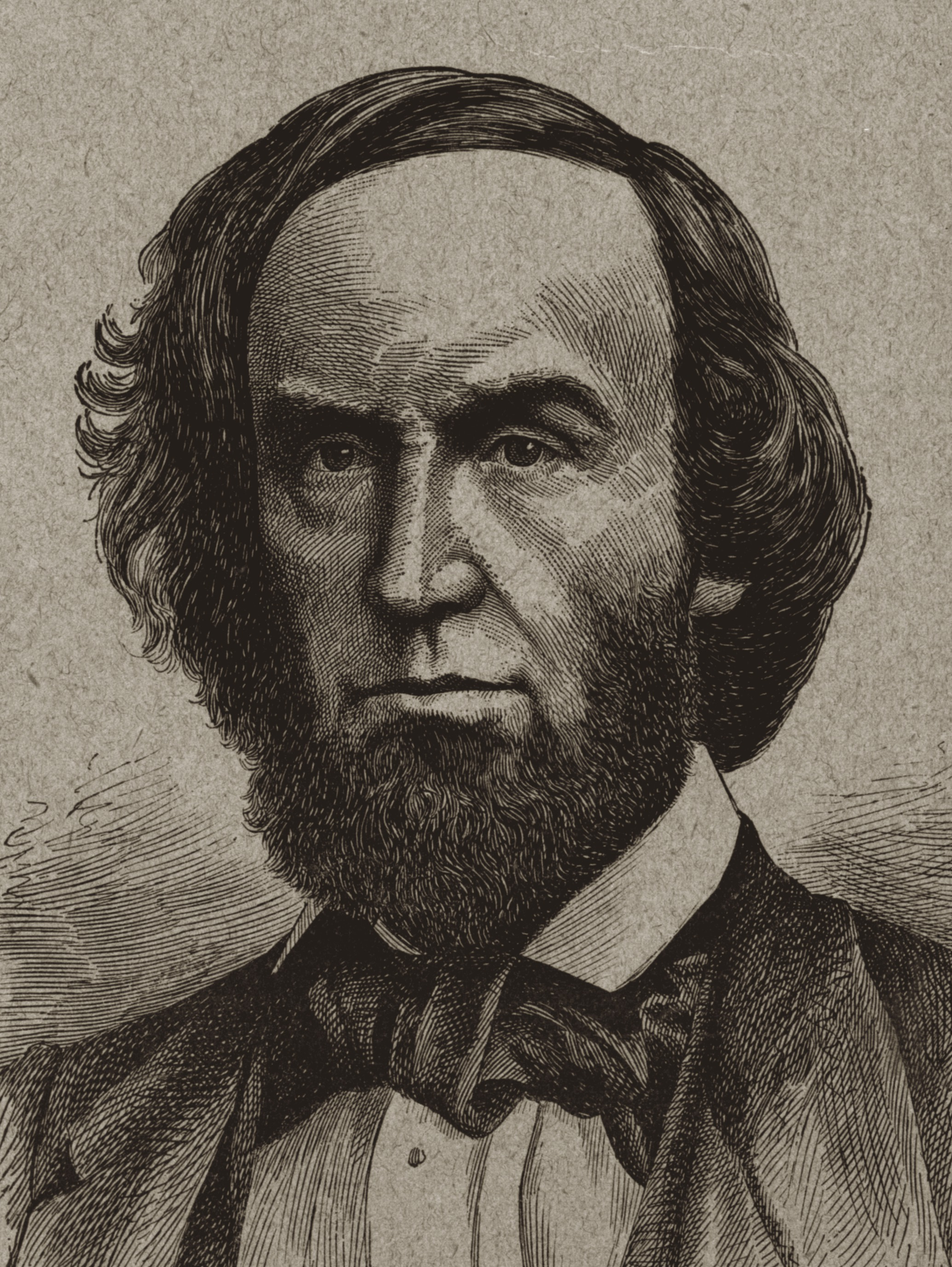
Claiborne Fox Jackson in an 1893 book.

In the fall of 1860 Jackson resigned as Banking Commissioner to run for governor. Jackson campaigned, and was elected as, a Douglas Democrat, supporting presidential candidate Stephen A. Douglas's anti-secession platform. Jackson defeated his nearest challenger, Sample Orr, by nearly ten thousand votes. Immediately after his election, however, Jackson began working behind the scenes for Missouri's secession. Jackson assumed the governor's office on January 3, 1861. During his inaugural address, he declared that Missouri shared a common bond and interest with other states that allowed slavery and could not separate herself from them if the Union should be dissolved. He called for a state convention to decide the issue.

On February 18, Missourians voted to have a special state convention to decide on secession and other matters. The convention delegates voted overwhelmingly 98–1 against secession, despite lobbying by Jackson. Jackson announced that he would continue the policy of his predecessor, Governor Robert M. Stewart, whereby Missouri would be an "armed neutral." The state would refuse to provide arms or men to either side in the approaching Civil War.

After the Confederate bombardment of Fort Sumter in South Carolina on April 12–13, President Abraham Lincoln issued a proclamation for the states to call up their militia and provide 75,000 troops to the Federal government to suppress the rebellion. He sent specific requests to all states, including Missouri.

Jackson responded,

Sir: Your dispatch of the 15th instant, making a call on Missouri for four regiments of men for immediate service, has been received. There can be, I apprehend, no doubt that the men are intended to form a part of the President's army to make war upon the people of the seceded states. Your requisition, in my judgment, is illegal, unconstitutional, and revolutionary in its object, inhuman, and diabolical and cannot be complied with. Not one man will the State of Missouri furnish to carry on any unholy crusade.

In this period, Jackson was carrying on secret correspondence with Confederate President Jefferson Davis, making plans to take Missouri out of the Union by a military coup. The key asset was the U.S. Arsenal in St. Louis, which contained large stocks of arms and ammunition. Jackson plotted to seize the Arsenal, and asked Davis to send artillery to breach the Arsenal's walls.

The commander of the Arsenal was Captain Nathaniel Lyon, a pro-Union regular Army officer. On April 26, 1861, under orders from Secretary of War Simon Cameron, Lyon worked with Missouri Volunteers and Illinois troops to secretly move 21,000 weapons (of 39,000 small arms held in the Arsenal) across the Mississippi River to Alton, Illinois, in order to protect them.

=== Capture of Camp Jackson ===
On May 3, 1861, Jackson ordered the Missouri Volunteer Militia to assemble at various encampments throughout Missouri, including St. Louis, for six days of training. They assembled in Lindell's Grove on the city's western outskirts, in an encampment now called Camp Jackson. Governor Jackson's order to assemble the militia was legal according to the Missouri state constitution, if the encampment was intended only for training, and not for offensive action against Federal forces. But, the St. Louis Militia was commanded largely by secessionists, and had recently enlisted a new regiment (2nd Regiment MVM) composed almost completely of secessionists. Also, Confederates had shipped artillery seized from the U.S. Arsenal in Baton Rouge. Arriving by steamboat, the artillery was secretly delivered to Camp Jackson.

Lyon responded to the perceived threat to control of the Arsenal with force. On May 10, 1861, Lyon surrounded Camp Jackson with pro-Union volunteer "Home Guards" (mostly drawn from the German immigrants of St. Louis), and took the Militia prisoner. As the prisoners were marched to the Arsenal, a riot broke out on the streets. During two days of rioting and gunfire, several soldiers, prisoners, and civilian bystanders were killed. Alarmed by the incident, the Missouri Legislature immediately acted on Governor Jackson's call for a bill dividing the state into military districts and authorizing a State Guard.

=== American Civil War ===
On May 11, 1861, Jackson appointed Sterling Price to be Major General of the Missouri State Guard; he ordered him to resist action by federal forces and Missouri Unionist Volunteers in Federal service. On May 12, Price met with General William S. Harney, the Federal commander in Missouri. They agreed to the Price-Harney Truce, which permitted Missouri to remain neutral for the moment.

Theoretically, Price promised that the state forces, and the state government, would hold the state for the Union and prevent the entry of Confederate forces. But, at the same time Governor Jackson had secretly dispatched envoys to CSA President Jefferson Davis and Confederate commanders in Arkansas asking for an immediate invasion of the state. He promised that the State Guard would cooperate with the Confederate Army in a campaign against Federal forces to effect the "liberation" of St. Louis. In addition, Lieutenant Governor Thomas C. Reynolds traveled to Richmond, with the agreement of Major General Price, to ask President Davis to order an invasion of the state. Missouri Unionists were dismayed at what they perceived as Harney's one-sided adherence to the "truce," and petitioned for Harney's removal from command. Harney was removed on May 30, and temporarily replaced with Lyon. He was promoted from captain to brigadier general of volunteers.

On June 11, 1861, Jackson met with Lyon, hoping to extend the truce, but Lyon refused. Lyon marched on Jefferson City with his forces, entering on June 13. Jackson and other pro-Confederate officials fled to Boonville, Missouri. Union forces routed the State Guard, commanded by Jackson's nephew John Sappington Marmaduke, at Boonville on June 17. At Carthage on July 5, Jackson took command of 6,000 State Guardsmen (becoming the second sitting U.S. Governor to lead troops in battle after Isaac Shelby of Kentucky did so during the War of 1812), and drove back a much smaller Union detachment led by Colonel Franz Sigel. But, the Union forces held a dominating position, and Lyon chased Jackson and Price to the far southwest of the state.

== Exile ==
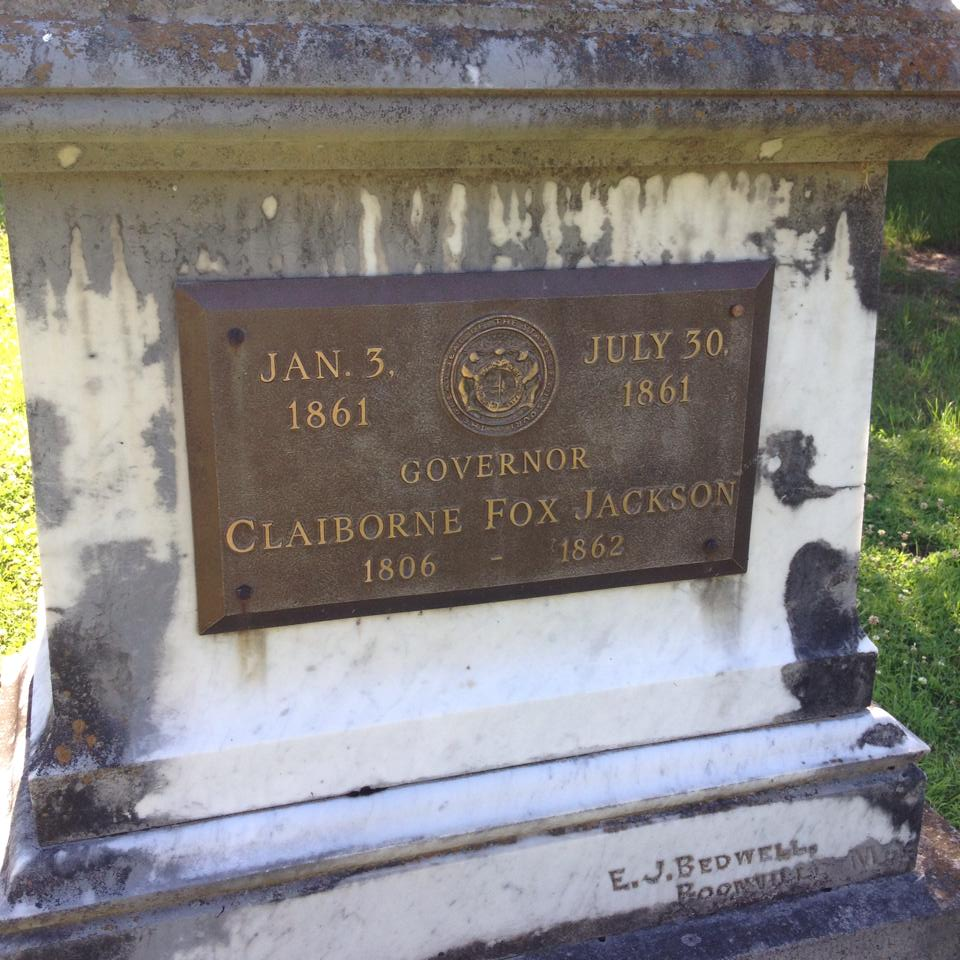
Jackson's tomb in the Sappington Cemetery, Saline County, Missouri

On July 22, 1861, the Missouri State Convention reconvened in Jefferson City. The convention again voted against secession, and on July 31, it declared the governor's office vacant. The same day the convention appointed Hamilton R. Gamble, former Chief Justice of the State Supreme Court, as provisional governor. He acted as governor for the remainder of the war.

Jackson did not recognize their actions; on August 5 he issued a proclamation declaring that Missouri was a free republic, and dissolving all ties with the Union. He traveled to Richmond, Virginia, to meet with Confederate President Davis to seek support for General Price's militia forces and official recognition by the Confederate government.

On October 28, 1861, in Neosho, Missouri, some secessionist members of the Missouri General Assembly met (with Jackson present) and passed an ordinance of secession. On November 28, 1861, the Confederacy recognized Missouri as its twelfth state, with Jackson as governor. The Neosho group elected senators and representatives to the Confederate Congress. But, Union forces occupied almost all of Missouri at the time, making the recognition and elections moot.

Jackson took refuge in Arkansas with General Price and the Missouri militia. They were soundly defeated by Union forces at the Battle of Pea Ridge in March 1862. Jackson traveled to southern Arkansas in the spring of 1862 to regroup and meet with other wealthy Missouri secessionists who had fled south. They discussed organizing a new campaign to retake Missouri, but Jackson died of pneumonia and stomach cancer before such actions took place. The invasion was never mounted.

== Death ==
His health grew increasingly poor throughout 1862, Jackson traveled to Little Rock, Arkansas, in November of that year for military planning meetings for the aforementioned campaign. On December 6, 1862, Jackson died from pneumonia at age 56 in a Little Rock rooming house, as he had become weakened from stomach cancer.

He was initially denied a burial in Missouri because of having led a secession movement. Jackson was buried in Little Rock's Mount Holly Cemetery. Following the end of the Civil War, he was exhumed, and reinterred in the family Sappington Cemetery of his in-laws in Saline County, Missouri. All three of his wives are buried there as well.

In 1967 the cemetery was acquired by the state as part of an effort to recognize the burial places of the state's governors. It has been preserved as a State Historic Site. Jackson's brother-in-law and governor Meredith Miles Marmaduke also died during the Civil War and was buried here. Their father-in-law, John Sappington, had founded the two-acre cemetery in 1831, and it has 111 plots.

== Legacy ==
A provisional camp of the Sons of Confederate Veterans in Caimito, Panama, was named after Claiborne Jackson.

== See also ==
- List of governors of Missouri
- List of people from Kentucky

Missouri House of Representatives
Preceded by Sterling Price	Speaker of the Missouri House of Representatives; 1844–1847	Succeeded by Alexander M. Robinson
Party political offices
Preceded by Robert M. Stewart	Democratic nominee for Governor of Missouri; 1860	Succeeded by Thomas L. Price
Political offices
Preceded by Robert M. Stewart	Governor of Missouri; 1861; In exile 1861–1862	Succeeded by Hamilton R. Gamble
Preceded by Robert M. Stewart	Governor of Missouri; 1861; In exile 1861–1862	Succeeded by Thomas C. Reynolds as Governor of Missouri (Confederate); In exile
