= Battle of Pea Ridge order of battle: Union =

The following Union Army units and commanders fought in the Battle of Pea Ridge. The Pea Ridge Confederate order of battle is shown separately.

== Abbreviations used ==
=== Military rank ===
- BG = Brigadier General
- Col = Colonel
- Ltc = Lieutenant Colonel
- Maj = Major
- Cpt = Captain
- Lt = 1st Lieutenant

=== Other ===
- k = killed
- w = wounded
- c = captured

== Army of the Southwest ==
=== Army Headquarters ===
BG Samuel R. Curtis

Units attached to Army Headquarters
Division	Brigade	Unit	Commander	Killed	Wounded	Missing	Casualties
Headquarters	Not Brigaded	24th Missouri Volunteer Infantry; Companies A, B, F, H, I	Maj Eli W. Weston	3	16	7	26
Headquarters	Not Brigaded	3rd Regiment Iowa Volunteer Cavalry; Companies A, B, C, D, M	Col Cyrus Bussey	24	17	9	50
Headquarters	Not Brigaded	Bowen’s Missouri Cavalry Battalion, 4 companies 4 12-pounder mountain howitzers	Maj William D. Bowen	1	3	2	6

=== First and Second Divisions ===
BG Franz Sigel

1st and 2nd Divisions: Franz Sigel
Division	Brigade	Unit	Commander	Killed	Wounded	Missing	Casualties
First Division; Col Peter J. Osterhaus	First Brigade; Col Peter J. Osterhaus	25th Illinois Volunteer Infantry Regiment	Col William N. Coler	3	18	3	24
First Division; Col Peter J. Osterhaus	First Brigade; Col Peter J. Osterhaus	44th Illinois Volunteer Infantry Regiment	Col Charles Knobelsdorff	1	2	0	3
First Division; Col Peter J. Osterhaus	First Brigade; Col Peter J. Osterhaus	17th Missouri Volunteer Infantry, Company A detached	Maj August H. Poten	0	2	8	10
First Division; Col Peter J. Osterhaus	Second Brigade; Col Nicholas Greusel	36th Illinois Volunteer Infantry Regiment; Company F detached	Col Nicholas Greusel	4	37	34	75
First Division; Col Peter J. Osterhaus	Second Brigade; Col Nicholas Greusel	12th Missouri Volunteer Infantry, Company E detached	Maj Hugo Wangelin	3	29	2	34
First Division; Col Peter J. Osterhaus	Artillery	4th Independent Battery, Ohio Light Artillery; 4 rifled 6-pounder guns & 2 12-pounder howitzers	Cpt Louis Hoffman	1	4	0	5
First Division; Col Peter J. Osterhaus	Artillery	Welfley’s Independent Battery, Missouri Light Artillery; 3 12-pounder howitzers & 2 12-pounder Napoleons	Cpt Martin Welfley	0	5	0	5
Second Division; BG Alexander Asboth (w)	First Brigade Col Frederick Schaefer	2nd Missouri Infantry Regiment	Ltc Bernard Laiboldt	8	34	12	54
Second Division; BG Alexander Asboth (w)	First Brigade Col Frederick Schaefer	15th Missouri Volunteer Infantry, Company B detached	Col Francis J. Joliat	0	0	11	11
Second Division; BG Alexander Asboth (w)	Not Brigaded	3rd Missouri Volunteer Infantry, Companies B, C, E	Maj Joseph Conrad	0	0	0	0
Second Division; BG Alexander Asboth (w)	Not Brigaded	4th Missouri Volunteer Cavalry; Companies A, C, D, E, F, I	Maj Emeric Meszaros	5	8	3	16
Second Division; BG Alexander Asboth (w)	Not Brigaded	5th Missouri Volunteer Cavalry	Col Joseph Nemett	3	11	3	17
Second Division; BG Alexander Asboth (w)	Artillery	1st Missouri Flying Artillery Battery; 4 rifled 6-pounder guns & 2 12-pounder howitzers	Cpt Gustavus M. Elbert	3	8	8	19
Second Division; BG Alexander Asboth (w)	Artillery	2nd Independent Battery, Ohio Light Artillery; 4 6-pounder guns & 2 12-pounder howitzers	Lt William B. Chapman	1	2	0	3

=== Third and Fourth Divisions ===
3rd and 4th Divisions: Independent
Division	Brigade	Unit	Commander	Killed	Wounded	Missing	Casualties
Third Division; Col Jefferson C. Davis	First Brigade; Col Thomas Pattison	8th Indiana Infantry Regiment	Col William P. Benton	5	27	0	32
Third Division; Col Jefferson C. Davis	First Brigade; Col Thomas Pattison	18th Indiana Infantry Regiment	Ltc Henry D. Washburn	3	23	0	26
Third Division; Col Jefferson C. Davis	First Brigade; Col Thomas Pattison	22d Indiana Infantry Regiment; Company B detached	Ltc John A. Hendricks (k); Maj David W. Daily, Jr.	9	33	0	42
Third Division; Col Jefferson C. Davis	First Brigade; Col Thomas Pattison	1st Battery, Indiana Light Artillery; 4 rifled 6-pounder guns & 2 6-pounder guns	Cpt Martin Klauss	0	5	6	11
Third Division; Col Jefferson C. Davis	Second Brigade; Col Julius White	37th Illinois Volunteer Infantry Regiment	Ltc Myron Barnes	20	121	3	144
Third Division; Col Jefferson C. Davis	Second Brigade; Col Julius White	59th Illinois Volunteer Infantry Regiment	Ltc Calvin H. Frederick	9	57	0	66
Third Division; Col Jefferson C. Davis	Second Brigade; Col Julius White	Battery A, 2d Illinois Light Artillery; 2 rifled 6-pounder guns & 2 6-pounder guns & 2 12-pounder howitzers	Cpt Peter Davidson	0	17	0	17
Third Division; Col Jefferson C. Davis	Not Brigaded	1st Missouri Cavalry Regiment; Companies B, F, G, H, I, K, L, M	Col Calvin A. Ellis	2	2	2	6
Fourth Division; Col Eugene A. Carr (w)	First Brigade; Col Grenville M. Dodge (w)	4th Iowa Volunteer Infantry Regiment	Ltc John Galligan (w)	18	139	3	160
Fourth Division; Col Eugene A. Carr (w)	First Brigade; Col Grenville M. Dodge (w)	35th Illinois Volunteer Infantry Regiment	Col Gustavus A. Smith (w); Ltc William P. Chandler (w)	14	47	52	113
Fourth Division; Col Eugene A. Carr (w)	First Brigade; Col Grenville M. Dodge (w)	3rd Illinois Volunteer Cavalry Regiment	Maj John McConnell	9	36	13	58
Fourth Division; Col Eugene A. Carr (w)	First Brigade; Col Grenville M. Dodge (w)	1st Independent Battery, Iowa Light Artillery; 4 6-pounder guns & 2 12-pounder howitzers	Cpt Junius A. Jones (w); Lt Virgil A. David	3	14	0	17
Fourth Division; Col Eugene A. Carr (w)	Second Brigade; Col William Vandever	9th Iowa Volunteer Infantry Regiment	Ltc Francis J. Herron (w/c); Maj William H. Coyl (w)	38	176	4	218
Fourth Division; Col Eugene A. Carr (w)	Second Brigade; Col William Vandever	Phelp's Independent Infantry Regiment	Col John S. Phelps (w)	12	71	11	94
Fourth Division; Col Eugene A. Carr (w)	Second Brigade; Col William Vandever	3d Independent Battery, Iowa Light Artillery; 4 6-pounder guns & 2 12-pounder howitzers	Cpt Mortimer M. Hayden	2	17	3	22
