= Battle of Pea Ridge order of battle =

The order of battle for the Battle of Pea Ridge includes:

- Battle of Pea Ridge order of battle: Confederate
- Battle of Pea Ridge order of battle: Union
