= Battle of Cotton Plant =

1862 battle of the American Civil War

Coordinates: 35.0365°N 91.293°W

- Part of the American Civil War
Date	July 7, 1862
Location	Woodruff County, Arkansas
Result	Union victory

Belligerents
United States	(Confederate States of America) Confederate States

Commanders and leaders
Samuel Ryan Curtis; Charles E. Hovey; William P. Benton	Thomas C. Hindman; Albert Rust; William H. Parsons

Units involved
Army of the Southwest	12th Texas Cavalry; 16th Texas Cavalry

Strength
10,000; Engaged: 600+	5,000; Engaged: Two regiments

Casualties and losses
63	90–250

Arkansas campaigns, March–July 1862

The Battle of Cotton Plant also known as Action at Hill's Plantation or Action at Cache River or Action at Round Hill (July 7, 1862) was fought during the American Civil War in Woodruff County, Arkansas. Frustrated in its attempt to march to Little Rock by a lack of supplies, the Union Army of the Southwest under the command of Samuel Ryan Curtis moved south down the White River. Curtis's army encountered a Confederate force led by Albert Rust on the east bank of the Cache River near Cotton Plant. Rust was only able to bring two Texas cavalry regiments into action. These horsemen attacked the Federal advance guard under Charles Edward Hovey, but after a spirited fight, Union reinforcements arrived and drove off the Texans. Rust's force made a disorderly retreat and Curtis's army was able to march south to Clarendon before veering east to occupy Helena on the Mississippi River.

== Background ==
=== Strategic situation ===
A few weeks after the Union victory at the Battle of Pea Ridge on March 7–8, 1862, Union General Curtis received reports that General Earl Van Dorn's Confederate army was moving east. On April 5, Curtis's department commander General Henry Halleck authorized a move eastward to block a possible offensive by Van Dorn. Accordingly, the Army of the Southwest marched east through the Missouri towns of Cassville, Forsyth, and West Plains. In fact, on March 23, General Albert Sidney Johnston ordered Van Dorn's troops to move to Corinth, Mississippi where a large Confederate army was assembling. In his zeal to execute the new instructions, Van Dorn denuded Arkansas of soldiers, weapons, ammunition, and other military supplies. Ironically, Van Dorn's troops arrived too late to fight in the Battle of Shiloh on April 6–7, a Confederate defeat.

=== Advance on Little Rock fails ===
After Shiloh, Halleck instructed Curtis to move into northeast Arkansas and rendezvous with another Federal force under General Frederick Steele. Curtis's army marched south from White Plains, crossing the state line on April 29 and reaching Batesville, Arkansas on May 2. Steele's soldiers arrived in nearby Jacksonport on May 4. However, Halleck directed Curtis to move half of his infantry to Cape Girardeau, Missouri where they would be transferred east of the Mississippi River. Dutifully, Curtis gathered seven Illinois, two Missouri, and one Indiana regiments, placed them under Generals Jefferson C. Davis and Alexander Asboth and sent them to Halleck. Curtis reorganized his remaining soldiers into three divisions: the Indiana regiments in the 1st under Steele, the Illinois and Iowa regiments in the 2nd under General Eugene Asa Carr, and the Missouri regiments in the 3rd under General Peter J. Osterhaus. Halleck then ordered Curtis to occupy Little Rock, about 100 mi (161 km) south. Curtis's May strength returns listed 6,000 infantry, 3,000 cavalry, and 1,000 artillerymen.

The Federal occupation of Batesville prompted Arkansas Governor Henry Massey Rector to call out the militia and move the state archives from Little Rock. Confederate General John Selden Roane complained that he was left to fight with "No troops - no arms - no powder" and vowed to detain all Texas units in transit through the state. P. G. T. Beauregard responded to Roane's request for a new leader by naming General Thomas C. Hindman to take charge of the Trans-Mississippi Department. Hindman's methods were high-handed, but he quickly managed to amass a field army of 4,000 Texas cavalry, 1,500 Arkansas infantry, and a battery of light artillery. Osterhaus's 3rd Division crossed the White River on May 7 and four days later it reached the Little Red River near Searcy. In the Battle of Whitney's Lane on May 19, 1862, Texas cavalrymen attacked a Federal foraging party of the 17th Missouri Volunteer Infantry and inflicted a loss of 15 killed, 32 wounded, and two missing. The next day, Carr's 2nd Division arrived on the Little Red River, ready to continue the advance. That day a message reached Curtis from the army's quartermaster that stated the army could no longer be supplied over the 300 mi (483 km) distance to the railhead at Rolla, Missouri. Curtis abandoned the drive on Little Rock.

=== Down the White River ===
On May 27, Curtis ordered the cavalry of Osterhaus and Carr to raid Confederate-held territory south of the Little Red River. Under cover of this operation, Union foraging parties collected more supplies. However, on June 4 the Federals fell back to Batesville. Curtis warned Halleck that the logistical situation was so dire that he might have to retreat to Missouri. The Siege of Corinth successfully ended on May 30, so Halleck responded by sending an expedition under Graham N. Fitch of the army and James Shirk of the navy up the White River. Aside from several regiments of infantry, the transports carried 100,000 bushels of grain and 2,500 bales of hay for Curtis's army. In the Battle of Saint Charles on June 17, the expedition suffered a setback when a Confederate round shot pierced the steam drum of the USS Mound City killing half its crew and injuring most of the survivors. Nevertheless, the expedition pushed upriver and reached Clarendon where it was halted by low water. When Curtis found that the expedition had stalled he decided to move down the White River toward Clarendon. In order to make this move, the Union commander had to cut his supply line to Rolla and order his soldiers live off the countryside. The Army of the Southwest left Batesville at the end of June. As Curtis's army moved, they foraged, pillaged, and destroyed property to the amount of $1.5 million. Abetted by the soldiers, African-American slaves fled from their plantations and over 3,000 joined the army on its march while others headed for Missouri.

On 24 June 1862, Hindman received information that Curtis's army was moving south down the east bank of the White River. He sent the Colonel Sweet's 15th Texas Cavalry Regiment on a raid across the White River above Batesville. Hindman claimed that 200 Union soldiers were taken prisoner and some supply wagons were captured before Colonel Cadwallader C. Washburn's Federal cavalry brigade drove off the Texans. Hindman ordered General Rust to cross to the east bank of the White at Des Arc and move upstream to a blocking position behind the Cache River. Concentrating at Cotton Plant, Rust's force was increased to a strength of 5,000 troops. Rust was ordered to block the roads, burn bridges, and destroy all food supplies, but this instruction was not carried out. Hindman himself remained at DeVall's Bluff with about 2,000 soldiers to oppose the Union river expedition. He also armed the steamer Tom Sugg with an 8-inch Columbiad to guard the White River. Hindman intended to leave 500 men to hold Devall's Bluff and march with the rest to reinforce Rust, but by then it was too late. Curtis advanced over the Cache.

== Opposing forces ==
The Battle of Cotton Plant saw a 10,000-strong Union Army commanded by Samuel Ryan Curtis encounter a 5,000-man Confederate force led by Albert Rust. A Union advance guard commanded by Charles Edward Hovey did most of the fighting, repelling an attack by two Texas cavalry regiments led by William Henry Parsons. Union reinforcements under William P. Benton arrived and pressed the Texas cavalry and Arkansas infantry into a disorderly retreat. Curtis's army subsequently occupied Helena. At the Battle of L'Anguille Ferry near Marianna on August 3, 1862, the Texas cavalry overran a Union wagon convoy.

=== Union ===
The following Union Army units and commanders served in the campaign.

==== Abbreviations used ====
- MG = Major General
- BG = Brigadier General
- Col = Colonel
- Hovey = Col Charles E. Hovey's brigade

==== Army of the Southwest ====
MG Samuel Ryan Curtis

Army of the Southwest - District of Eastern Arkansas - May 1862 (Note: Dyer did not specify brigades or brigade commanders. Patrick stated that Hovey and Benton were brigade commanders in Steele's Division.)
Division	Unit
Unattached units MG Samuel Ryan Curtis	Bowen's Missouri Cavalry Battalion
Unattached units MG Samuel Ryan Curtis	24th Missouri Volunteer Infantry
Unattached units MG Samuel Ryan Curtis	1st Illinois Cavalry Regiment
Unattached units MG Samuel Ryan Curtis	5th Illinois Cavalry Regiment
Unattached units MG Samuel Ryan Curtis	9th Illinois Cavalry Regiment
Unattached units MG Samuel Ryan Curtis	13th Illinois Cavalry Regiment
Unattached units MG Samuel Ryan Curtis	5th Kansas Cavalry Regiment (joined June)
Unattached units MG Samuel Ryan Curtis	2nd Wisconsin Cavalry Regiment (joined June)
Unattached units MG Samuel Ryan Curtis	1st Nebraska Infantry Regiment (joined July)
First Division; BG Frederick Steele	11th Wisconsin Volunteer Infantry Regiment (Hovey)
First Division; BG Frederick Steele	33rd Illinois Infantry Regiment (Hovey)
First Division; BG Frederick Steele	8th Indiana Infantry Regiment
First Division; BG Frederick Steele	18th Indiana Infantry Regiment
First Division; BG Frederick Steele	Kane County Illinois Cavalry Company
First Division; BG Frederick Steele	1st Indiana Cavalry Regiment
First Division; BG Frederick Steele	3rd Iowa Volunteer Cavalry Regiment (6 companies)
First Division; BG Frederick Steele	1st Independent Battery Indiana Light Artillery
First Division; BG Frederick Steele	16th Ohio Battery
First Division; BG Frederick Steele	Battery A, 1st Missouri Light Artillery
Second Division; BG Eugene A. Carr	4th Iowa Volunteer Infantry Regiment
Second Division; BG Eugene A. Carr	9th Iowa Volunteer Infantry Regiment
Second Division; BG Eugene A. Carr	13th Illinois Infantry Regiment
Second Division; BG Eugene A. Carr	3rd Illinois Cavalry Regiment
Second Division; BG Eugene A. Carr	4th Iowa Volunteer Cavalry Regiment
Second Division; BG Eugene A. Carr	1st Missouri Cavalry Regiment (3 companies)
Second Division; BG Eugene A. Carr	1st Iowa Independent Battery Light Artillery
Second Division; BG Eugene A. Carr	Elbert's 1st Missouri Flying Artillery
Second Division; BG Eugene A. Carr	3rd Iowa Independent Battery Light Artillery
Third Division; BG Peter J. Osterhaus	3rd Missouri Volunteer Infantry
Third Division; BG Peter J. Osterhaus	12th Missouri Volunteer Infantry
Third Division; BG Peter J. Osterhaus	17th Missouri Volunteer Infantry
Third Division; BG Peter J. Osterhaus	4th Missouri Volunteer Cavalry (6 companies)
Third Division; BG Peter J. Osterhaus	5th Missouri Volunteer Cavalry (5 companies)
Third Division; BG Peter J. Osterhaus	2nd Ohio Battery
Third Division; BG Peter J. Osterhaus	4th Ohio Battery
Third Division; BG Peter J. Osterhaus	Battery A (Peoria), 2nd Illinois Light Artillery
Third Division; BG Peter J. Osterhaus	Battery B, 1st Missouri Light Artillery (Welfley's)

== Battle ==
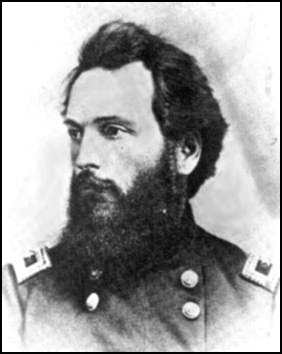
Charles E. Hovey

On July 7, 1862, the Army of the Southwest reached James Ferry on the Cache River, found that the water was low enough to ford, and began to cross. Colonel Charles Edward Hovey who led a brigade in Steele's 1st Division sent Colonel Charles Harris of the 11th Wisconsin Volunteer Infantry Regiment with 400 soldiers to scout ahead. Harris's advance force included four companies of the 11th Wisconsin, four companies of the 33rd Illinois Infantry Regiment, and a detachment of the 1st Indiana Cavalry Regiment including one cannon. Harris led his force south to a road intersection at Parley Hill's Plantation which was about 3 mi (4.8 km) northwest of Cotton Plant. Harris directed his troops down the Clarendon road which led toward Cotton Plant. However, Hovey learned that a Federal soldier was captured, recalled Harris, and ordered him to take the Des Arc road that led to the southwest.

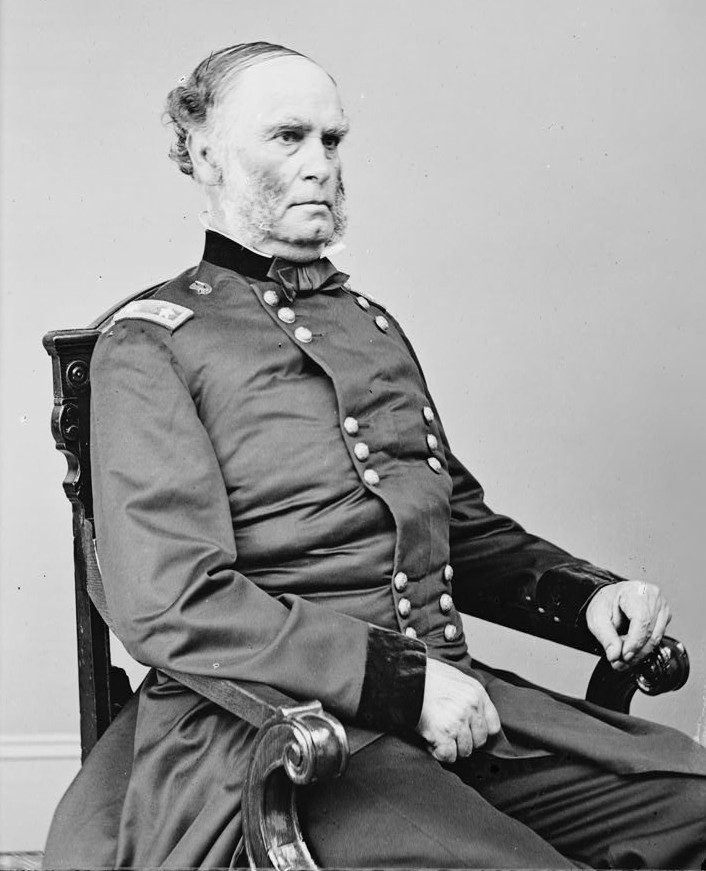
Samuel R. Curtis

Rust's force consisted of five regiments of Texas cavalry, three regiments of Arkansas infantry, and one battery of artillery. Rust ordered Colonel William H. Parsons with 1,000 troopers of Parson's own 12th Texas Cavalry Regiment and Colonel William Fitzhugh's 16th Texas Cavalry Regiments to hold the river crossing at James Ferry. The day before, the 12th Texas was prepared to advance. But Parsons decided to wait for the 16th Texas which was slow, so the 12th Texas camped about 6 mi (10 km) south of the crossing. About 9:00 am, Parsons learned that Union soldiers were crossing the Cache at James Ferry. He turned northeast to follow the Des Arc road and sent 20 horsemen ahead in skirmish formation across a cypress swamp.

Hovey held one Wisconsin company at the intersection and sent Harris forward with the rest. Harris's three Wisconsin companies passed the Hill house, a cornfield, and then entered a forest in skirmish formation. One Illinois company and the cannon backed-up the skirmishers. The other three Illinois companies were farther back. As the Wisconsin skirmishers groped through the underbrush they spotted Parsons's horsemen. The first firing started at 40 yd (37 m) range between the 20 Texas skirmishers and some Union cavalrymen. At least three Texans were hit right away. Harris pressed forward but his skirmishers were hit by a blast of fire when they bumped into the main body of the 12th Texas. Harris was wounded but kept directing his men. The Texas cavalry charged on horseback, driving back the Wisconsin troops. Edward M. Pike won the Medal of Honor for actions that saved the Union cannon from capture. Hovey ordered the three Wisconsin companies, the supporting Illinois company, and the gun to retreat toward the intersection. Hovey sent the remaining three Illinois companies to take cover in the cornfield. As Parsons's horsemen burst from the trees in pursuit of the Wisconsin soldiers, the Federals in the cornfield met them with a shattering volley followed by heavy fire. After many saddles were emptied, the Texas cavalry retreated into the forest. Hovey held his ground and waited for the next Confederate move. Parsons's horsemen pulled back behind the cypress swamp.

In an attempt to separate Hovey's force from Curtis's main body, Rust accompanied Colonel James R. Taylor's 17th Texas Cavalry Regiment in a wide sweep to the northeast. The horsemen circled through Cotton Plant and neared the road intersection. But as they approached, the Confederates heard the tap of a drum and a large number of Union soldiers rose to their feet. The Texas regiment withdrew. These Union troops were the four Wisconsin companies, the Illinois company, and the one gun which had rallied. Not long afterward, 200 Union reinforcements from the 1st Indiana Cavalry arrived plus two additional 3-inch Ordnance rifles. After an artillery barrage, Hovey organized another attack and after about 20 minutes of fighting, the Confederates fell back. Later, General William P. Benton's brigade from the 1st Division reached the battlefield and continued the pursuit. The Confederate retreat toward Des Arc became a rout. That evening, the Confederates got across the lower crossing of the Cache River and destroyed their boats, preventing further pursuit.

== Results ==
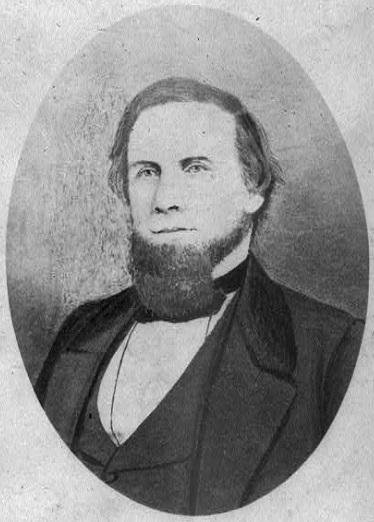
Albert Rust

The Federals admitted losing six killed and 57 wounded during the action. They claimed to have killed 138 Confederates and 66 horses. One estimate gave Confederate losses as 250. Another source estimated a Confederate loss of 30 killed and 50–60 wounded. One Texan reported that the 12th Texas lost 14 killed, 20 seriously wounded, 16 slightly wounded, and two missing. He guessed that the 16th Texas lost about the same.

Curtis proceeded to Clarendon which his troops reached on July 9, only to find that the flotilla had departed the previous day. Fitch and Shirk were not able to make contact with Curtis's army and would wait no longer. Curtis ordered cannons fired and sent couriers racing downstream, but the fleet disappeared downriver. Curtis had maintained a faint hope that he might renew his advance on Little Rock by basing on the White River. Now the Federal commander realized that resupplying his troops was the highest priority. Therefore, he turned his marching columns toward Helena which was about 45 mi (72 km) to the east. The Army of the Southwest occupied Helena without opposition on July 12 after a very difficult march in intense heat and clouds of dust. Union troops hailed passing transports in the Mississippi River and the army was soon resupplied. Curtis set up his headquarters in Hindman's mansion. In mid-summer 1862, Federal military operations in the Western theater ground to a halt. For several months, Curtis's troops remained unemployed while greedy cotton traders swarmed in Helena. The regiments from the Army of the Southwest were eventually absorbed into the Army of the Tennessee. Union forces held Helena for the duration of the war. On July 4, 1863, the Helena garrison repulsed an assault by Confederate forces in the Battle of Helena.

== Notes ==
Footnotes

Citations

== See also ==
- Nelson, Glenn T.; Squier, John D. (1989). "The Confederate Defense of Northeast Arkansas and the Battle of Cotton Plant, Arkansas, July 7, 1862". Rivers & Roads & Points in Between. 16: 5–27.
- Vicksburg Campaign Trail website
- National Park Service battle description
- CWSAC Report Update and Resurvey: Individual Battlefield Profiles
- Civil War’s “Teachers’ Regiment” faced hard slog during Arkansas campaign - Pantagraph (Bloomington, Illinois newspaper)
