= James M. Elson =

American Civil War Medal of Honor recipient (1838-1894)

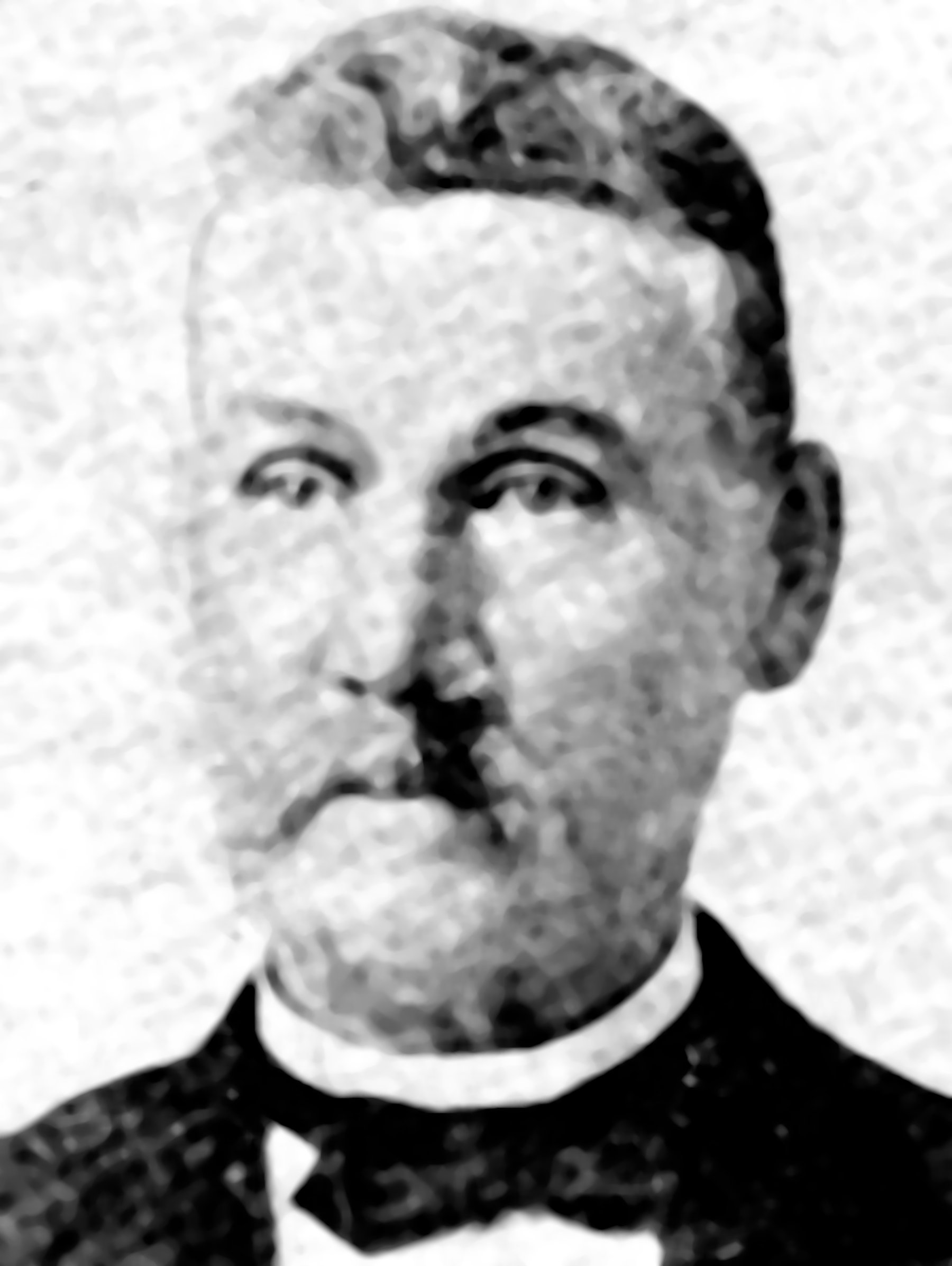
- Elson in 1891
- Born: November 6, 1838; Coshocton, Ohio, US
- Died: March 26, 1894 (aged 55); Shellsburg, Iowa, US
- Burial place: Oakwood Cemetery, Shellsburg, Iowa
- Military career
- Allegiance: United States
- Branch: US Army
- Rank: Sergeant
- Units: Company C, 9th Iowa Volunteer Infantry Regiment
- Awards: Medal of Honor

Sergeant James M. Elson (November 6, 1838 – March 26, 1894) was an American soldier who fought in the American Civil War. Elision received the country's highest award for bravery during combat, the Medal of Honor, for his action during the Battle of Vicksburg in Mississippi on 22 May 1863. He was honored with the award on 12 September 1891.

== Life and career ==
James M. Elson was born in Coshocton, Ohio, on November 6, 1838, the fourth of eight children of Samuel Elson (1809–1877) and Matilda Ann Cresap (1795–1873). He was raised on the family farm in Lafayette, Ohio during which time he received his education by attending the common schools. In 1852, the family moved to a new farm in Fayette, Iowa. By the 1860 census, he was working on the family farm with his parents and five of his siblings. The following year, he was working in some capacity of farming in Palo, Iowa.

=== Military service ===
On September 6, 1861, he enlisted in Company C, 9th Iowa Infantry in Shellsburg, Iowa. He spent 1862 with his regiment fighting in the victory at the Battle of Pea Ridge where they were in the 2nd Brigade of the 4th Division of Curtis's Army of the Southwest.

After the victory, they moved to eastern Arkansas where they joined 3rd Brigade, 11th Division, Right Wing 13th Army Corps (Old), Dept. of Tennessee, until reorganized the division became the 4th Division of Sherman's Corps during the Yazoo Expedition. In January, 1863, Grant reorganized the Army of the Tennessee and the 9th joined the 3rd Brigade, 1st Division, XV Corps, where they served during the Battle of Jackson and Siege of Vicksburg during the latter when Elson performed the act which would later gain him the Medal of Honor. In that action, a bullet passed through his right thigh.

After recovering from his wounds, Elson rejoined the 9th as part of the 2nd Brigade, 1st Division, XV Corps during the Chattanooga and Atlanta Campaigns. On leave between the two campaigns, he returned to Fayette to marry Margaret E Anderson (1843–1876) a Pennsylvania native, on January 2, 1864.

During the Atlanta campaign, Elson received a second wound, this in the right breast, the ball taking a downward course and lodging in his side, where it remained until his death in 1894. On August 25, 1864, he was promoted to 1st Lieutenant. He rejoined the 9th for Sherman's March to the Sea and the Carolinas campaign when the regiment switched back to the 3rd Brigade, 1st Division, XV Corps. Due to his length of service and two wounds, Elson was mustered out at Goldsboro, North Carolina, on April 6, 1865. The rest of the regiment would do so later on July 18, 1865, in Louisville, Kentucky.

=== Postwar life ===
Upon discharge, he resumed farming in Linn County. On the farm, two sons, Frank A (1866–1937) and Edward John (1868–1945) were born. In 1869 the family moved to Shellsburg, and he owned and operated a dry goods merchandising store for three years. By 1872, he started an insurance business. On November 26, 1876, he lost his wife Margaret shortly after the birth of their daughter, Maggie (1876–1877). Shortly after Maggie's death, he adopted an infant son, Harry Anderson Elson (1877–1939).

In December, 1879, he took for his second wife Adelaide C "Addie C. Lewis," a native of Vermont. In January, 1884, Elson was appointed Postmaster at Shellsburg, held this office until Oct. 1, 1885. He was frequently active in local politics. In 1876, he joined Ancient Order of United Workmen and due to his experience in the insurance industry, became his lodge's insurance agent.

During the ongoing review of official war records that the War Department carried out in the second half of the nineteenth century, Elson was nominated for the Medal of Honor. He received this on 12 September 1891.

Elson lost his second wife, Addie, on November 6, 1891, after fourteen years of marriage. In 1893 he was elected sheriff of Benton County, but died from a heart attack on March 26, 1894, at age 56.

== Medal of Honor citation ==
The President of the United States of America, in the name of Congress, takes pleasure in presenting the Medal of Honor to Sergeant James M. Elson, United States Army, for extraordinary heroism on 22 May 1863, while serving with Company C, 9th Iowa Infantry, in action at Vicksburg, Mississippi. Sergeant Elson carried the colors in advance of his regiment and was shot down while attempting to plant them on the enemy's works.

== See also ==
- List of American Civil War Medal of Honor recipients: A–F
- 9th Iowa Volunteer Infantry Regiment
- Battle of Pea Ridge
- Yazoo Expedition
- Battle of Jackson
- Siege of Vicksburg
- Chattanooga campaign
- Atlanta campaign
- Sherman's March to the Sea
- Carolinas campaign
- Ancient Order of United Workmen
