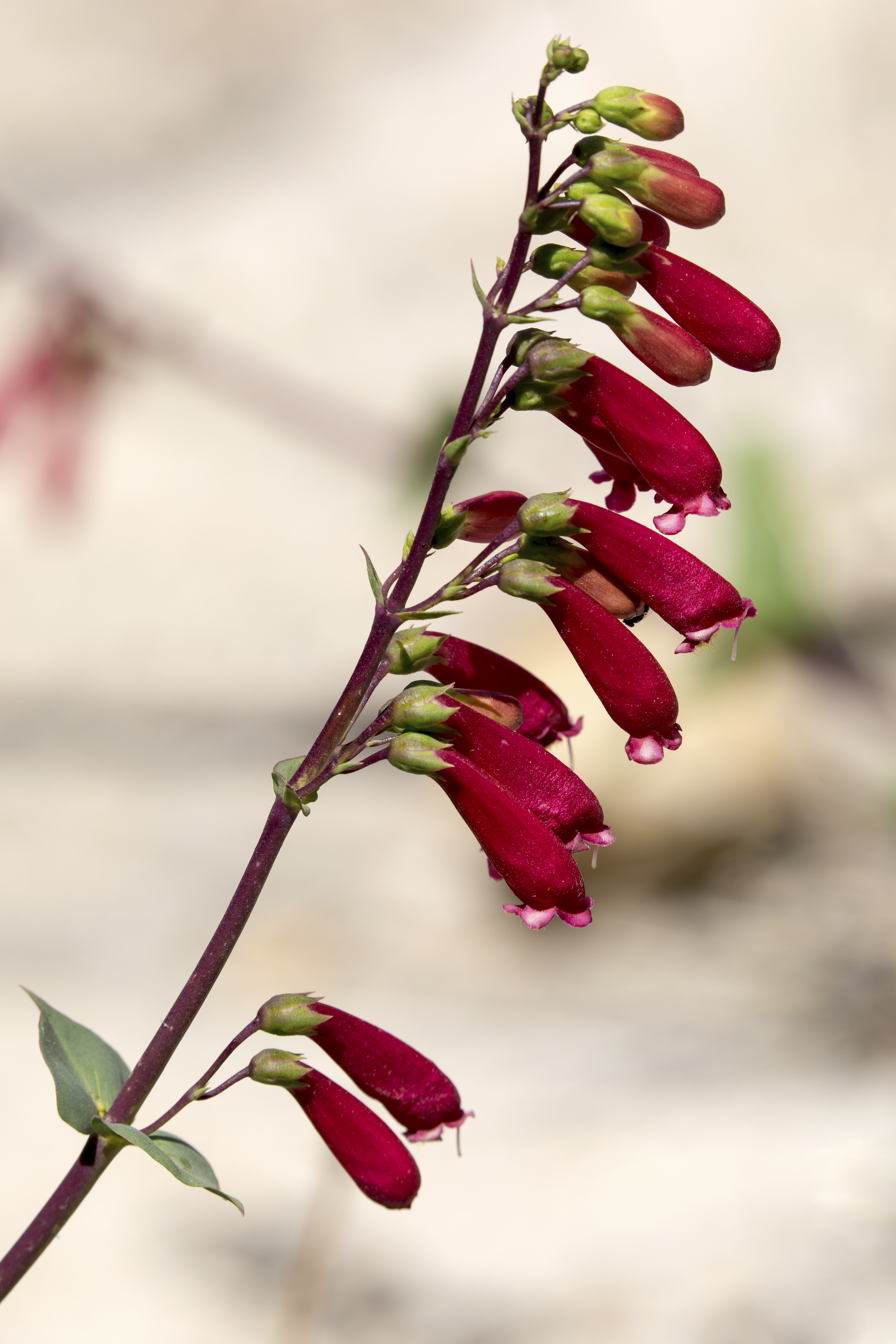
- Carlsbad Caverns National Park

Conservation status
- Vulnerable (NatureServe)

Scientific classification
- Kingdom: Plantae
- Clade: Tracheophytes
- Clade: Angiosperms
- Clade: Eudicots
- Clade: Asterids
- Order: Lamiales
- Family: Plantaginaceae
- Genus: Penstemon
- Species: P. cardinalis

Binomial name
- Penstemon cardinalis Wooton & Standl.

Subspecies
- P. c. var. cardinalis; P. c. var. regalis

Synonyms
- Penstemon crassulus; Penstemon regalis

= Penstemon cardinalis =

Plant species in the veronica family

Penstemon cardinalis, the cardinal penstemon, is a species of penstemon with red flowers that grows in New Mexico and Texas.

== Description ==
Cardinal penstemons are perennial plants that grow flowering stems that are 32 to 100 centimeters (12.5–39.5 in) tall. A plant can have just a few or several stems that are hairless and slightly glaucous.

The leaves are also hairless, but are not glaucous, with the lowest ones on the stems and the basal leaves measuring 4 to 15 centimeters (1.5–6 in) long and 1.4–6 cm (0.5–2.5 in) wide. The stems have three to seven pairs of leaves attached to opposite sides.

Flowering for variety cardinalis in New Mexico is in June or July, while variety regalis typically blooms in May or June, but occasionally as late as August in its native habitat. The flowers are dark red to blue-red tubes that are slightly swollen with a smaller mouth. The flowers measure 22–30 mm and are only weakly two lipped.

Its fruits are capsules that measure 10–15 millimeters long and 5–9 mm wide.

== Taxonomy ==
Penstemon cardinalis is classified in the Penstemon genus as part of the Plantaginaceae family. It was scientifically described and named in 1913 by E. O. Wooton and Paul Carpenter Standley. It has two accepted varieties.

=== Penstemon cardinalis var. cardinalis ===
The autonymic variety of the species is native to the state of New Mexico. It differs from the other variety of the species in having leaves that are not leathery in texture and sepal lobes that are much shorter, usually 1.6–3.5 mm long and only occasionally reaching 4 mm.

=== Penstemon cardinalis var. regalis ===
This variety was first described as a species by Aven Nelson in 1934. It was later reclassified as a subspecies and finally as a variety by Craig Carl Freeman in 2017. Its leaves have a leathery texture and the lobes of its sepals are 4–6 mm long.

Penstemon cardinalis has three synonyms of its two varieties.

Table of Synonyms
Name	Year	Rank	Synonym of:	Notes
Penstemon cardinalis subsp. regalis (A.Nelson) G.T.Nisbet & R.C.Jacks.	1960	subspecies	var. regalis	≡ hom.
Penstemon crassulus Wooton & Standl.	1913	species	var. cardinalis	= het.
Penstemon regalis A.Nelson	1934	species	var. regalis	≡ hom.
Notes: ≡ homotypic synonym; = heterotypic synonym

=== Names ===
The species name, cardinalis, is a reference to the deep red color of the flowers. Similarly Penstemon cardinalis is known by the common name cardinal penstemon. They are also known as cardinal beardtongue or scarlet beardtongue. Variety regalis is known by the common names royal red penstemon, Guadalupe penstemon, Guadalupe beard tongue, and royal beardtongue.

== Range and habitat ==
The variety cardinalis grows on two mountain ranges in New Mexico, the Capitan Mountains and Sacramento Mountains in Lincoln and Otero counties. Variety regalis also grows in New Mexico, but in the Guadalupe Mountains in just Eddy County. It is more widespread in Texas growing in the Davis Mountains, Guadalupe Mountains, and the Sierra Diablo. Variety cardinalis grows at a slightly higher elevation range of 2,100–2,700 m (6,900–8,900 ft) while regalis grows at 1,400–2,500 m (4,600–8,200 ft).

Variety cardinalis is associated with ponderosa pine forests and Rocky Mountain Douglas-firs, growing on Rocky slopes and in canyon bottoms. It also is found in pinyon-juniper woodlands. Variety regalis is similarly associated with Madrean pine–oak woodlands.

=== Conservation ===
When evaluated in 2012 NatureServe rated cardinal penstemon as vulnerable at the global level (G3), but rated it as apparently secure (S4) in New Mexico and imperiled (S2) in Texas.
