= Clock of the Long Now =

Clock designed to keep time for 10,000 years

Coordinates: 31.44841°N 104.90384°W

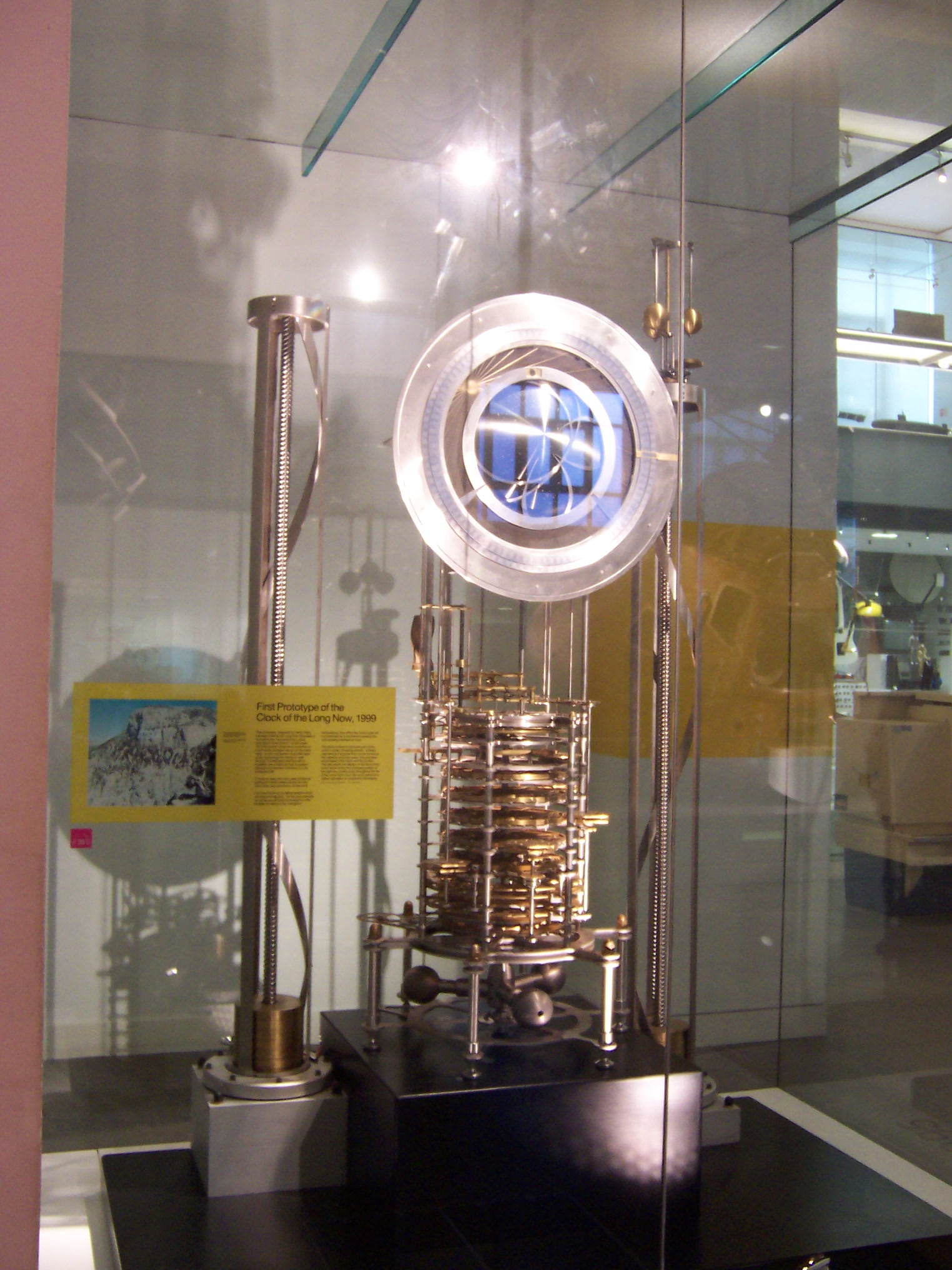
The first prototype, on display at the Science Museum in London, 2005

The Clock of the Long Now, also called the 10,000-year clock, is a mechanical clock under construction that is designed to keep time for 10,000 years. It is being built by the Long Now Foundation. A two-meter prototype is on display at the Science Museum in London. As of June 2018, two more prototypes are on display at The Long Now Museum & Store at Fort Mason Center in San Francisco.

The project was conceived by Danny Hillis in 1989. The first prototype of the clock began working on December 31, 1999, just in time to display the transition to the year 2000. At midnight on New Year's Eve, the date indicator changed from 01999 to 02000, and the chime struck twice.

The manufacture and site construction of the first full-scale prototype clock is being funded by Jeff Bezos's investment firm Bezos Expeditions, with $42 million, and is on land which Bezos owns in the Sierra Diablo mountains in Texas.

== Purpose ==
In the words of Stewart Brand, a founding board member of the foundation, "Such a clock, if sufficiently impressive and well-engineered, would embody deep time for people. It should be charismatic to visit, interesting to think about, and famous enough to become iconic in the public discourse. Ideally, it would do for thinking about time what the photographs of Earth from space have done for thinking about the environment. Such icons reframe the way people think."

== Design ==
I want to build a clock that ticks once a year. The century hand advances once every one hundred years, and the cuckoo comes out on the millennium. I want the cuckoo to come out every millennium for the next 10,000 years. If I hurry I should finish the clock in time to see the cuckoo come out for the first time.

— Danny Hillis, "The Millennium Clock", Wired Scenarios, 1995

The basic design principles and requirements for the clock are:

1. Longevity: The clock should be accurate even after 10,000 years, and must not contain valuable parts (such as jewels, expensive metals, or special alloys) that might be looted.
2. Maintainability: Future generations should be able to keep the clock working, if necessary, with nothing more advanced than Bronze Age tools and materials.
3. Transparency: The clock should be understandable without stopping or disassembling it; no functionality should be opaque.
4. Evolvability: It should be possible to improve the clock over time.
5. Scalability: To ensure that the final large clock will work properly, smaller prototypes must be built and tested.

Whether the clock will actually receive continued care and maintenance for such a long time is debatable. Hillis chose the 10,000-year goal to be just within the limits of plausibility. There are technological artifacts, such as fragments of pots and baskets, from 10,000 years in the past, so there is some precedent for human artifacts surviving this long, although very few human artifacts have been continuously tended for more than a few centuries.

=== Power considerations ===
Many options were considered for the power source of the clock, but most were rejected due to their inability to meet the requirements. For example, nuclear power and solar power systems would violate the principles of transparency and longevity. In the end, Hillis decided to require regular human winding of a falling weight design for updating the clock face because the clock design already assumes regular human maintenance.

However, the clock is designed to keep time even when not being wound: "If there is no attention for long periods of time the Clock uses the energy captured by changes in the temperature between day and night on the mountain top above to power its time-keeping apparatus."

=== Timing considerations ===
The timing mechanism for such a long lasting clock needs to be reliable and robust as well as accurate. The options considered but rejected as sources of timing for the clock included:

==== Self-contained clocks ====
Most of these methods are inaccurate (the clock will slowly lose the correct time), but are reliable (that is, the clock will not suddenly stop working). Other methods are accurate but opaque (meaning that the clock is difficult to read or understand).

- gravity pendulum (inaccurate over the long term, and requires many ticks, which creates wear)
- torsion pendulum (fewer ticks, but less accurate)
- balance wheel (less accurate than pendulum)
- water flow (inaccurate)
- solid material flow (inaccurate)
- wear and corrosion (very inaccurate)
- rolling balls (very inaccurate)
- diffusion (inaccurate)
- tuning fork (inaccurate)
- pressure chamber cycle (inaccurate)
- inertial governor (inaccurate)
- atomic oscillator (opaque, difficult to maintain)
- piezoelectric crystal oscillator (opaque, difficult to maintain)
- atomic decay (opaque, difficult to measure precisely)

==== External events that the clock could track or be adjusted by ====
Many of these methods are accurate (some external cycles are very uniform over huge stretches of time) but unreliable (the clock could stop working completely if it failed to track the external event properly). Others have separate difficulties.

- daily temperature cycle (unreliable)
- seasonal temperature cycle (imprecise)
- tidal forces (difficult to measure)
- Earth's rotating inertial frame (difficult to measure accurately)
- stellar alignment (unreliable because of weather)
- solar alignment (unreliable because of weather)
- tectonic motion (difficult to predict and measure)
- orbital dynamics (difficult to scale)

Hillis concluded that no single source of timing could meet the requirements. As a compromise the clock will use an accurate but unreliable timer to adjust an inaccurate but reliable timer, creating a phase-locked loop.

In the current design, a slow mechanical oscillator, based on a torsional pendulum, keeps time inaccurately, but reliably. At noon, the light from the Sun, a timer that is accurate but due to weather unreliable, is concentrated on a segment of metal through a lens. The metal buckles and the buckling force resets the clock to noon. The combination can, in principle, provide both reliability and long-term accuracy.

=== Displaying the time and date ===
Many of the usual units displayed on clocks, such as hours and calendar dates, may have little meaning after 10,000 years. However, every human culture counts days, months (in some form), and years, all of which are based on lunar and solar cycles. There are also longer natural cycles, such as the 25,765-year precession of Earth's axis. On the other hand, the clock is a product of our time, and it seems appropriate to pay homage to our current arbitrary systems of time measurement. In the end, it seemed best to display both the natural cycles and some of the current cultural cycles.

The center of the clock will show a star field, indicating both the sidereal day and the precession of the zodiac. Around this will be a display showing the positions of the Sun and the Moon in the sky, as well as the phase and angle of the Moon. Outside this will be a double dial with digits, showing the year according to our current Gregorian calendar system. This will be a five-digit display, indicating the current year in a format like "02000" instead of the more usual "2000" (to avoid a Y10K problem). Hillis and Brand plan, if they can, to add a mechanism whereby the power source generates only enough energy to keep track of time; if visitors want to see the time displayed, they would have to manually supply some energy themselves.

=== Time calculations ===
Options considered for the part of the clock that converts time source (for example, a pendulum) to display units (for example, clock hands) include electronics, hydraulics, fluidics, and mechanics.

A problem with using a conventional gear train (which has been the standard mechanism for the past millennium) is that gears necessarily require a ratio relationship between the timing source and the display. The required accuracy of the ratio increases with the amount of time to be measured. (For instance, for a short period of time the count of 29.5 days per lunar month may suffice, but over 10,000 years the number 29.5305882 is a much more accurate choice.)

Achieving such precise ratios with gears is possible, but awkward; similarly, gears degrade over time in accuracy and efficiency due to the deleterious effects of friction. Instead, the clock uses binary digital logic, implemented mechanically in a sequence of stacked binary adders (or as their inventor, Hillis, calls them, serial bit-adders). In effect, the conversion logic is a simple digital computer (more specifically, a digital differential analyser), implemented with mechanical wheels and levers instead of typical electronics. The computer has 32 bits of accuracy, with each bit represented by a mechanical lever or pin that can be in one of two positions. This binary logic can only keep track of elapsed time, like a stopwatch; to convert from elapsed to local solar time (that is, time of day), a cam subtracts from (or adds to) the cam slider, which the adders move.

Another advantage of the digital computer over the gear train is that it is more evolvable. For instance, the ratio of day to years depends on Earth's rotation, which is slowing at a noticeable but not very predictable rate. This could be enough to, for example, throw the phase of the Moon off by a few days over 10,000 years. The digital scheme allows that conversion ratio to be adjusted, without stopping the clock, if the length of the day changes in an unexpected way.

=== Location ===
The Long Now Foundation has purchased the top of Mount Washington near Ely, Nevada, which is surrounded by Great Basin National Park, for the permanent storage of the full-sized clock, once it is constructed. It will be housed in a series of rooms (the slowest mechanisms visible first) in the white limestone cliffs, approximately 10,000 feet (3,000 m) up the Snake Range. The site's dryness, remoteness, and lack of economic value should protect the clock from corrosion, vandalism, and development. Hillis chose this area of Nevada in part because it is home to a number of dwarf bristlecone pines, which the Foundation notes are nearly 5,000 years old. The clock will be almost entirely underground, and only accessed by foot traffic from the east once complete.

Before building the public clock in Nevada, the foundation is building a full-scale clock of similar design in a mountain of the Sierra Diablo range near Van Horn, Texas. The test drilling for the underground construction at this site was started in 2009. The site is on property owned by Amazon founder Jeff Bezos, who is also funding its construction. The lessons learned in the construction of this first full-scale 10,000-year clock will inform the final design of the clock in Nevada.

According to a FAQ published on the Foundation of the Long Now's website in 2024, the prototype clock in Texas has been designated as the primary location for the 10,000 year clock project due to the complexity and cost of the project.

== History ==
Hillis published the first public article describing the clock in Wired in 1995 and the Long Now Foundation was founded to support development of the clock and related projects in 1996. The foundations first employee, Alexander Rose, was hired to manage the clock project, which was then the Foundation’s source of funding. Rose later became the Foundation’s first executive director, and under his leadership its activities broadened to include other very long-term projects, such as the Rosetta Project (to preserve the world’s languages) and Long Bets.

Neal Stephenson’s 2008 novel Anathem was partly inspired by his involvement with the project, to which he contributed three pages of sketches and notes. The Long Now Foundation sells a soundtrack for the novel, with profits going to the Foundation.

Musician Brian Eno suggested the name “Clock of the Long Now” to Hillis and later wrote an essay describing his inspiration for the phrase. Eno also collaborated with Hillis on writing music for the chimes of the full-scale prototype.

== See also ==
- Astronomical clock
- Big History
- Deep time
- Jens Olsen's World Clock
- Rasmus Sørnes
- Beverly Clock
- Longplayer
