= Mount Washington (Nevada) =

Mountain in Nevada, United States

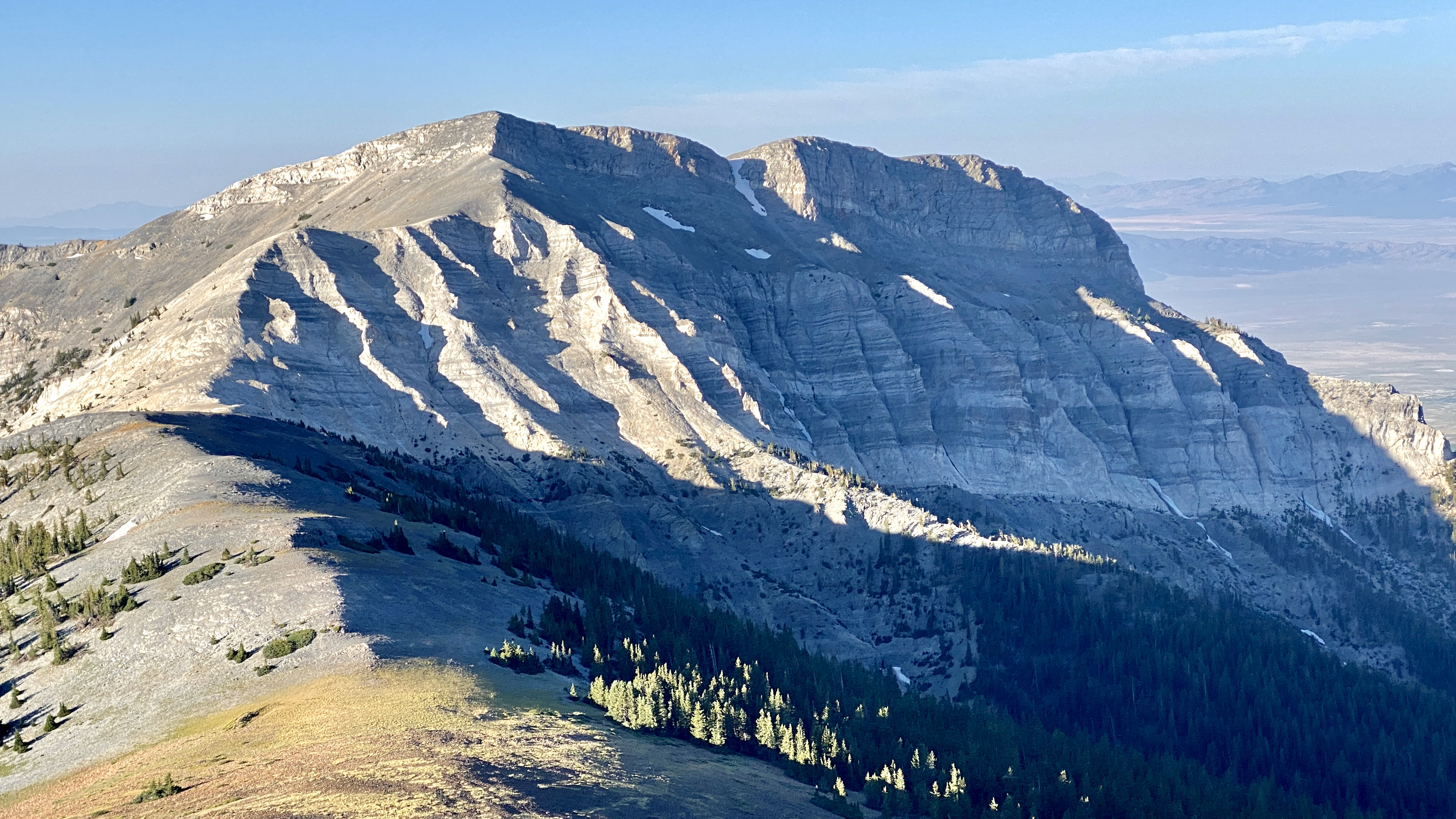
- North aspect

Highest point
- Elevation: 11,658 ft (3,553 m)
- Prominence: 498 ft (152 m)
- Coordinates: 38°54′54″N 114°18′33″W

Geography
- Location within Nevada
- Location: Great Basin National Park; White Pine County, Nevada, U.S.
- Parent range: Snake Range
- Topo map: USGS Wheeler Peak

Mount Washington is a mountain in White Pine County in the state of Nevada. The mountain climbs to an elevation of 11,658 feet (3,553 m) and is in Great Basin National Park.

Land near the summit and adjoining the national park was purchased in 2001 by The Long Now Foundation as a potential site for the Clock of the Long Now. The announcement of the land purchase was made at Baker, the gateway town of the national park, and in nearby Ely, Nevada, at a gathering of White Pine County officials sponsored by Ely's Economic Diversification Council. The property was described as 180.3 acres (73.0 ha) made up of eleven patented mining claims dating back to 1916.
