= Frederick Schaefer =

- Born: Grand Duchy of Baden
- Died: 1862; Murfreesboro, Tennessee
- Military career
- Allegiance: United States of America; Union
- Branch: United States Army; Union Army
- Service years: 1861 – 1862
- Rank: Colonel, U.S.V.
- Commands: 2nd Missouri Infantry
- Conflicts: American Civil War: Battle of Pea Ridge; Siege of Corinth; Battle of Stones River†

Frederick Schaefer was a German revolutionary and Union Army colonel during the American Civil War. He was a brigade commander at the battles of Pea Ridge and Stones River where he was killed in action.

== Biography ==
Schaefer was born in the Grand Duchy of Baden and served in the armed forces there. He came to the United States as a result of his participation in the Revolutions of 1848, and settled in Missouri. He was appointed colonel of the 2nd Missouri Infantry and assigned to the Army of the Southwest. His regiment was part of the understrength 2nd Division commanded by Brig. Gen. Alexander Asboth. By seniority of his rank, Schaefer assumed command of the 1st Brigade. During the battle of Pea Ridge, Asboth's division was primarily held in reserved. On the second day of the battle, Schaefer's brigade took part in Franz Sigel's counterattack.

After the Union victory at Pea Ridge much of the Army of the Southwest was transferred to the Western Army Group commanded by Henry Halleck. Asboth's division was decreased to a brigade status in the Army of the Mississippi. Schaefer returned to regimental command during the siege of Corinth. During the Kentucky Campaign, Schaefer was on sick leave and his regiment was led by Lieutenant Colonel Bernard Laiboldt. When Schaefer returned to command he was once again the ranking officer in his brigade. He assumed command of the 2nd Brigade in Philip H. Sheridan's 3rd Division of the XIV Corps. During the battle of Stones River Schaefer's brigade was initially held in reserve of Sheridan's division. His men were soon on the front lines and eventually began to run low on ammunition. Not having an adequate supply on hand, Sheridan ordered his brigade commanders to fix bayonets and continue to resist the Confederate attacks. Sheridan's division was hard pressed throughout the first day of the battle and Schaefer became Sheridan's fourth brigade commander to fall in battle.

== Notes ==
=== References ===
- Shea, William & Earl Hess. Pea Ridge: Civil War Campaign in the West University of North Carolina Press, 1992. ISBN 0-8078-4669-4.
