= Battle of the Diablo Mountains =

1854 battle in the Jicarilla War

- Part of the Apache Wars
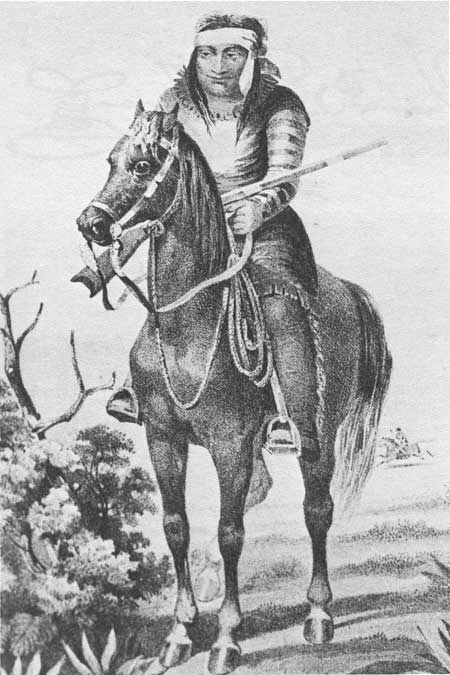
- A Lipan Apache, circa 1857
Date	October 3, 1854
Location	Sierra Diablo, Texas
Result	United States victory

Belligerents
United States	Apache

Commanders and leaders
(United States) John G. Walker	Unknown

Strength
~40 cavalry	~200+ warriors

Casualties and losses
Unknown, 1 known wounded	Unknown

The Battle of the Diablo Mountains was an October 1854 engagement between the U.S. Army and the Lipan Apache. A small force of Mounted Rifles attacked a much larger force of Lipan Apaches at the base of the Diablo Mountains in Texas.

== Battle ==
Setting out from Fort Inge in South Texas on October 1, 1854, Captain John G. Walker, in command of around 40 men of the Mounted Rifles, headed for the Diablo Mountains region along the Rio Grande border with Mexico.

Their mission was to investigate the reports from local settlers of stolen livestock, taken by Apache warriors. On the third day out, in the morning of October 3, 1854, Captain Walker and his men encountered well over 200 Lipan warriors near a herd of captured farm animals. Immediately Walker ordered an attack which surprised the Apaches significantly. A brief skirmish ensued and the Apaches quickly fled, leaving most of the stolen livestock. Casualties are unknown, except for Second Lieutenant Eugene Asa Carr who was wounded by an arrow and subsequently commended by General Persifor F. Smith for his "gallantry and coolness" and promoted to first lieutenant. This was the future general's first combat action.

== See also ==
- American Indian Wars
