= 5th Missouri Cavalry Regiment (Union) =

- Active: 14 Feb. 1862 – 15 Nov. 1862
- Country: United States
- Allegiance: (United States) Union; Missouri
- Branch: Union Army
- Type: Cavalry
- Size: Regiment
- Part of: Army of the Southwest
- Nickname(s): Benton Hussars
- Engagements: American Civil War; Engagement at Fredericktown (1861); Battle of Pea Ridge (1862); Battle of Cotton Plant (1862)

Commanders
- Notable commanders: Joseph Nemett

5th Missouri Cavalry Regiment, also known as the Benton Hussars, was a cavalry unit from Missouri that briefly served in the Union Army during the American Civil War. The regiment was formed on 14 February 1862. The regiment fought at the Battle of Pea Ridge in March 1862 and elements were present at the Battle of Cotton Plant in July 1862. The regiment was consolidated with the 4th Missouri Volunteer Cavalry Regiment on 15 November 1862. The Benton Hussars were organized on 18 September 1861 and fought at Fredericktown in October 1861.

== Previous units ==
=== Benton Hussars ===
Organized at St. Louis, Mo., September 18-December 23, 1861. Served unattached, Army of the West, to January, 1862. 2nd Division, Army Southwest Missouri, Dept. Missouri, to February, 1862, participating in skirmish at Hunter's Farm, near Belmont, Mo., September 26, 1861. At Bird's Point, Mo., October. Operations about Ironton-Fredericktown October 12–25. Engagement at Fredericktown October 21. Expedition from Bird's Point against Thompson's forces November 2–12. Duty in Southeast Missouri until January, 1862, and in District of Southwest Missouri to February, 1862. Assigned to 5th Missouri Cavalry February 14, 1862.

=== Hollan Horse ===
Organized at St. Louis and Warrenton, Mo., October 14, 1861, to February 1, 1862. Duty at Warrenton and St. Louis until February, 1862. Assigned to 4th and 5th Regiments, Missouri Cavalry, February, 1862.

== History ==
Organized by consolidation of Benton Hussars and 3 Companies of Hollan Horse February 14, 1862. Served unattached, 2nd Division, Army of Southwest Missouri, Dept. of Missouri, to October, 1862. Army of South- east Missouri, Dept. of Missouri, to November, 1862. SERVICE.--Curtis' Campaign in Missouri and Arkansas against Price February–March, 1862. Battles of Pea Ridge, Ark., March 6–8. Duty in District of South-west Missouri until October. Expedition to Blue Mountains June 19. Near Knight's Cove June 19. Expedition from Clarendon to Lawrenceville and St. Charles September 11–13. Ordered to Pilot Knob October. Consolidated with 4th Missouri Cavalry November 15, 1862.

Regiment lost during service 1 Officer and 4 Enlisted men killed and mortally wounded and 1 Officer and 36 Enlisted men by disease. Total 42.

== See also ==
- List of Missouri Union Civil War units
