= 2nd Missouri Infantry Regiment (Union) =

- Active: September 10, 1861, to October 1, 1864
- Country: United States
- Allegiance: Union
- Branch: Infantry
- Engagements: Fremont's Springfield Expedition; Battle of Pea Ridge; Siege of Corinth; Battle of Perryville; Battle of Stones River; Tullahoma Campaign; Battle of Chickamauga; Siege of Chattanooga; Battle of Orchard Knob; Battle of Missionary Ridge; Relief of Knoxville; Battle of Rocky Face Ridge (Assault at Buzzard's Roost); 2nd Battle of Dalton

The 2nd Missouri Infantry Regiment was an infantry regiment, formed from a voluntary regiment using the same name, that served in the Union Army during the American Civil War.

== 2nd Missouri Volunteer Infantry ==
Voluntary Infantry
- Active: April 22, 1861, to August 31, 1861
- Country: United States
- Allegiance: Union
- Branch: Infantry
- Engagements: Camp Jackson Affair; Battle of Boonville; Expedition to Mexico, Missouri; Battle of Wilson's Creek

A voluntary infantry regiment evolved from one of several unofficial pro-Unionist militia units formed semi-secretly in St. Louis in the early months of 1861 by Congressman Francis Preston Blair Jr. and other Unionist activists. The organization that would become the Second Missouri was largely composed of ethnic Germans, who were generally opposed to slavery and strongly supportive of the Unionist cause. Although initially without any official standing, beginning on April 22, 1861, four militia regiments Blair helped organize were sworn into Federal service at the St. Louis Arsenal by Captain John Schofield acting on the authority of President Lincoln.

The 2nd Missouri Infantry Regiment included a significant number of members with military experience from service in Europe. Many had also participated in drill and marksmanship competitions in St. Louis's many Turnverein societies. The Second Missouri was an unusually large regiment, having two dedicated "Rifle Companies" in addition to its ten companies of infantry. Upon entry into Federal service the members of the new Second Missouri elected Henry Boernstein colonel of the regiment. The new Missouri Volunteer regiments, subsequently elected (then) Captain Nathaniel Lyon as the brigadier general of the new brigade of Missouri volunteers. President Lincoln would later confirm Lyon's promotion from Captain to Brigadier general.

=== Military service ===
On May 10, 1861, the 2nd Missouri Infantry participated in the arrest of the Missouri Volunteer Militia drilling at Camp Jackson at Lindell Grove on the western border of St. Louis City. As the Missouri militiamen were being march under guard back to the Arsenal near the riverfront, angry crowds confronted the Federal forces and the confused situation soon devolved into rioting and gunfire. Over 27 people were killed and the Camp Jackson Affair helped to polarize the state and send Missouri down the road to its own internal civil war.

On June 15, 1861, the 2nd Missouri Infantry participated in the unopposed occupation of the Missouri state capitol at Jefferson City, Missouri, by Federal troops. Nine companies of the Second Missouri remained as the garrison at Jefferson City, under Colonel Boerstein who acted as interim military commandant of the city.

Company "B" and Rifle Companies "A" and "B" continued up river in pursuit of fugitive Governor Claiborne Fox Jackson and the Missouri State Guard. At Boonville the three company battalion of the Second Missouri, fighting under the command of Captain Peter J. Osterhaus helped defeat the newly organized Missouri State Guard on June 17 in the short, one-sided Battle of Boonville. While the Battle of Boonville was small by later war standards, it had major strategic consequences, driving the pro-secessionist forces into the southern part of the state and securing the Missouri River valley and communications across the state for the Federal government.

The Second Missouri garrison at Jefferson City made a number of expeditions and "scouts" into the counties near the state capital and the central Missouri River valley. A Second Missouri detachment from Jefferson City fought a small engagement with guerrillas at Mexico Missouri, on July 15, 1861.

Osterhaus' small battalion continued to campaign with Lyon, marching southwest to Springfield, eventually confronting a united Confederate and Missouri State Guard force near Springfield. The resulting Battle of Wilson's Creek fought ten miles south of the city on August 10, 1861, was a bloody affair, and the second costliest in American history up to that time. Osterhaus, by that time promoted to major, led his men in the fighting as part of Lyon's detachment of the Federal force on Bloody Hill. Isolated and outnumbered after a second Federal element under Colonel Franz Sigel was routed, the Federals on Bloody hill fought the Confederate forces to a stalemate. The battle ended only after General Lyon was killed leading the 1st Iowa Infantry against the Confederate right. As the senior U.S. Army regular officer present, command devolved to Major Samuel D. Sturgis. Concerned about his force's ammunition supply, Sturgis decided to withdraw towards Springfield.

Osterhaus' men withdrew with the battered Federal force to Springfield, then to Rolla, continuing on to St. Louis.

The regiment was mustered out of Federal service on August 31, and the members were reorganized as the Second Missouri Volunteers (3 Years Service) on September 10, 1861, under Colonel Friedrich Schaefer.

== Regiment service ==
The 2nd Missouri Infantry Regiment was organized at St. Louis, Missouri and mustered in for three years on September 10, 1861, under the command of Colonel Frederick Schaefer.

The regiment was attached to 5th Brigade, Army of Southwest Missouri, Department of Missouri, November 1861 to February 1862. 1st Brigade, 2nd Division, Army of Southwest Missouri, to May 1862. 2nd Brigade, 5th Division, Army of the Mississippi, to September 1862. 35th Brigade, 11th Division, Army of the Ohio, to October 1862. 35th Brigade, 11th Division, III Corps, Army of the Ohio, to November 1862. 2nd Brigade, 3rd Division, Right Wing, XIV Corps, Army of the Cumberland, to January 1863. 2nd Brigade, 3rd Division, XX Corps, to October 1863. 1st Brigade, 2nd Division, IV Corps, to October 1864.

=== Detailed service ===
Moved to Jefferson City, Mo., September 1861. Fremont's Campaign against Springfield, Mo., October 4-November 8. Moved to Rolla, Mo., November 8, and duty there until February 1862. Curtis' Campaign against Price in Missouri and Arkansas February and March. Advance on Springfield, Mo., February 2–11. Pursuit of Price into Arkansas February 14–29. Battles of Pea Ridge, Ark., March 6, 7 and 8. March to Batesville April 5-May 3. Moved to Cape Girardeau, Mo., May 11–22; thence to Pittsburg Landing, Tenn., May 23–26. Advance on and siege of Corinth, Miss., May 27–30. Pursuit to Booneville May 31-June 6. At Rienzi until August 26. Moved to Cincinnati, Ohio, August 26-September 4; thence to Louisville September 17–19. Pursuit of Bragg into Kentucky October 1–16. Battle of Perryville, Ky., October 8. March to Nashville, Tenn., October 16-November 7, and duty there until December 26. Reconnaissance to Mill Creek November 27. Advance on Murfreesboro, Tenn., December 26–30. Battle of Stones River December 30–31, 1862 and January 1–3, 1863. At Murfreesboro until June. Expedition toward Columbia March 4–14. Tullahoma Campaign June 23-July 7. Fairfield June 27 and 29. Estill Springs July 2. Occupation of middle Tennessee until August 16. Reconnaissance from Cowan to Anderson July 11–14. Passage of Cumberland Mountains and Tennessee River and Chickamauga Campaign August 16-September 22. Battle of Chickamauga September 19–20. Siege of Chattanooga September 24-November 23. Chattanooga-Ringgold Campaign November 23–27. Orchard Knob November 23–24. Missionary Ridge November 25. Pursuit to Graysville November 26–27. March to relief of Knoxville November 28-December 8. Campaign in eastern Tennessee December 1863 to February 1864. Charleston, Tenn., December 28, 1863. About Dandridge January 16–17, 1864. Moved to Chattanooga, thence to Cleveland, Tenn., and duty there until May. Demonstrations on Rocky Faced Ridge and Dalton, Ga., May 8–13. Buzzard's Roost Gap May 8–9. Assigned to garrison duty at Dalton, Ga., May 14 to September. Action at Dalton August 14–15.

The 2nd Missouri Infantry was mustered out of service on October 1, 1864.

=== Casualties ===
The regiment lost a total of 188 men during service; 6 officers and 85 enlisted men killed or mortally wounded, 3 officers and 94 enlisted men died of disease.

=== Commanders ===
- Colonel Frederick Schaefer - in brigade command at Pea Ridge and Stones River; killed at Stones River
- Lieutenant Colonel Bernard Laiboldt - commanded at the battles of Pea Ridge, Stones River, Missionary Ridge, Calhoun (Tenn.), Rocky Face Ridge, and Second Dalton.
- Major Francis Ehrler - commanded at the battle of Stones River
- Major Arnold Beck - commanded at the battle of Chickamauga
- Captain Walter Hoppe, Company H - commanded at the battle of Perryville where he was killed in action

== See also ==
- Missouri Civil War Union units
- Missouri in the Civil War
