= 9th Iowa Infantry Regiment =

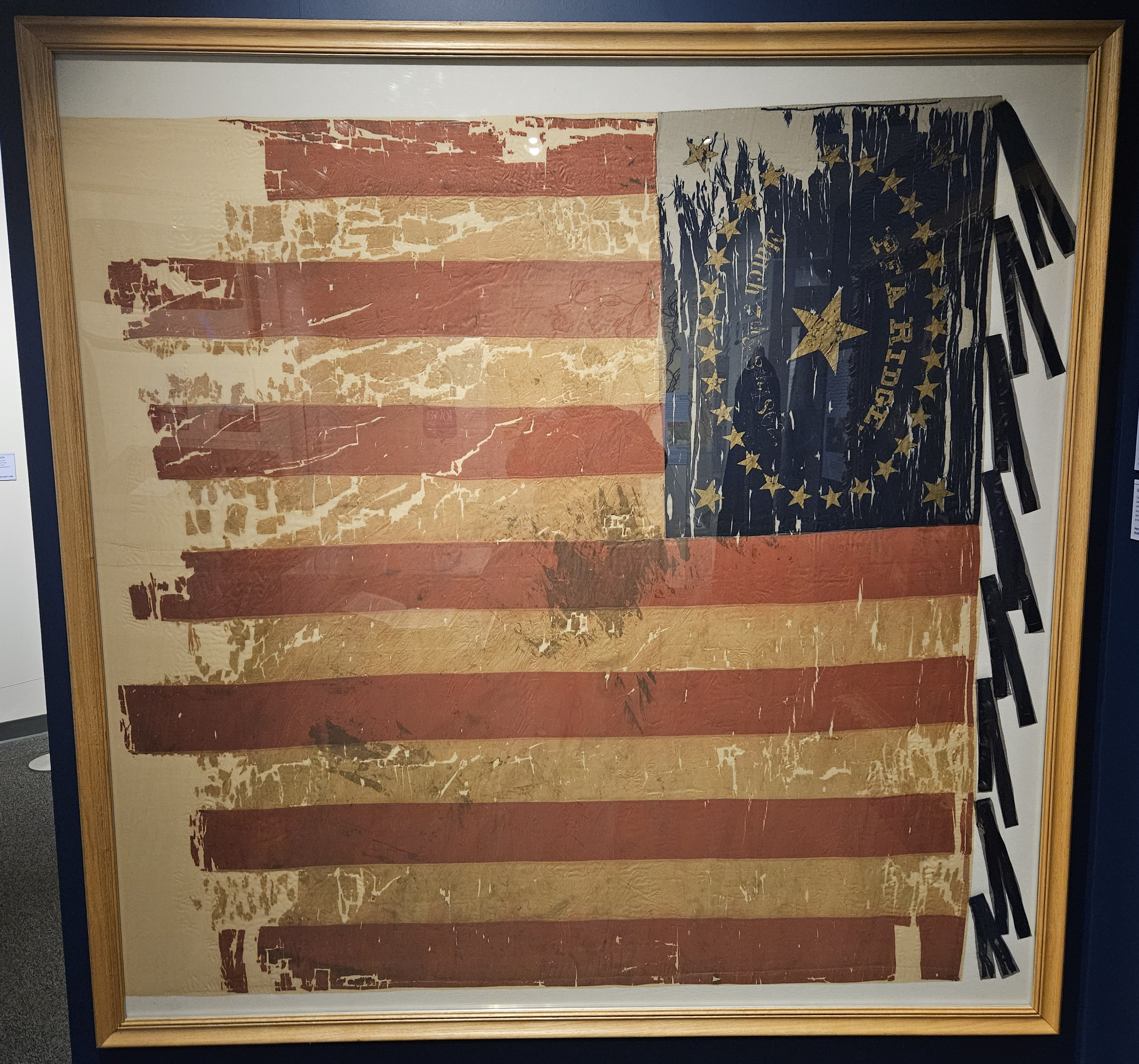
- 9th Iowa Infantry Regiment flag
- Active: September 24, 1861 – July 18, 1865
- Disbanded: July 18, 1865
- Country: United States
- Branch: Union
- Type: Infantry
- Size: Regiment
- Engagements: American Civil War: Battle of Pea Ridge; Battle of Jackson, Mississippi; Siege of Vicksburg; Battle of Lookout Mountain; Battle of Atlanta; Sherman's March to the Sea; Battle of Bentonville

The 9th Iowa Infantry Regiment was an infantry regiment that served in the Union Army during the American Civil War.

== Service ==
The 9th Iowa Infantry was organized at Dubuque, Iowa and mustered into Federal service on September 24, 1861. The Honorable William Vandever, Representative from the 2nd Congressional District, Iowa, was authorized by President Lincoln to organize this regiment from the counties in his district, and he was commissioned by Governor Samuel J. Kirkwood as its first Colonel. The regiment went without a standard of colors until a group of women from Massachusetts presented them with a regimental flag in 1862.

Service History:

- Ordered to St. Louis, Missouri, Attached to Dept. of Missouri October, 1861, to January, 1862.
- Unattached, Army of Southwest Missouri, to February, 1862.
- 2nd Brigade, 4th Division, Army of Southwest Missouri, to May, 1862. (Battle of Pea Ridge)
- 2nd Division, Army of Southwest Missouri, to July, 1862.
- District of Eastern Arkansas, Dept. of Missouri, to November, 1862.
- 3rd Brigade, 1st Division, District of Eastern Arkansas, Dept of Tennessee, to December, 1862.
- 3rd Brigade, 11th Division, Right Wing 13th Army Corps (Old), Dept. of Tennessee, to December, 1862.
- 3rd Brigade, 4th Division, Sherman's Yazoo Expedition, to January, 1863.
- 3rd Brigade, 1st Division, 15th Army Corps, Army of the Tennessee, to September, 1863. (Battle of Jackson, Siege of Vicksburg)
- 2nd Brigade, 1st Division, 15th Army Corps, to September, 1864. (Chattanooga Campaign, Atlanta campaign)
- 3rd Brigade, 1st Division, 15th Army Corps, to July, 1865. (Sherman's March to the Sea. Carolinas campaign)

The regiment was mustered out on July 18, 1865, in Louisville, Kentucky.

Before the regiment disbanded, the men gave their standard of colors to William Vandever as a memento. In 1886, Vandever presented the flag to veterans of the 9th Iowa Infantry at the annual encampment of the Grand Army of the Republic reunion in San Francisco and later wrote:

They gathered close around it and their manly bosoms heaved with emotion, and noble tears coursed down their cheeks. It is a sacred relic that I prize today more than anything else that I have in this world, coming to me as a memento of the sacrifices made to sustain this Union and as a freewill offering from the women of this country, and as a token of their sympathy in our struggle.

== Total strength and casualties ==
Total enrolment was 1,440. The regiment lost 12 officers and 142 enlisted men who were killed in action or who died of their wounds and 2 officers and 230 enlisted men who died of disease, for a total of 386 fatalities. 385 were wounded.

== Companies with the Counties of Origin ==
Company A - enrolled in Jackson County, Iowa
Company B - enrolled in Jones County, Iowa
Company C - enrolled in Dubuque County, Iowa
Company D - enrolled in Jones County, Iowa
Company E - enrolled in Clayton County, Iowa
Company F - enrolled in Fayette County, Iowa
Company G - enrolled in Black Hawk County, Iowa; Bremer County, Iowa
Company H - enrolled in Winneshiek County, Iowa
Company I - enrolled in Howard County, Iowa
Company K - enrolled in Linn County, Iowa

== Notable Officers ==
- William Vandever. Residence Dubuque. Appointed Colonel Aug. 30, 1861. Mustered Sept. 24, 1861. Promoted Brigadier General, March 16, 1863. Resigned March 16, 1863. Brevet Major General June 7, 1865
- Francis J. Herron. Residence Dubuque. Appointed Lieutenant Colonel Sept. 10, 1861. Mustered Sept. 24, 1861. Wounded March 7, 1862, Peas Ridge, Ark. Promoted Brigadier General July 30, 1862; Major General Nov. 29, 1863.
- David Carskaddon. Residence Marion, nativity Ohio. Enlisted Sept. 14, 1861. Appointed Captain Sept. 24, 1861. Mustered Sept. 24, 1861. Promoted Colonel March 19, 1863. Wounded slightly July 29, 1864, Atlanta, Ga. Discharged for disability Dec. 29, 1864.
- William H. Coyl. Residence Decorah. Appointed Major Aug 30, 1861. Mustered Sept 24, 1861. Wounded in shoulder severely March 7, 1862, Pea Ridge, Ark. Promoted Lieutenant Colonel July 1, 1862; Brevet Lieutenant Colonel March 13, 1865; Major and Judge Advocate May 18, 1865<
- William Scott. Residence Independence, nativity England. Appointed Adjutant Sept 2, 1861, from Second Lieutenant of company C. Mustered Sept. 24, 1861. Wounded in leg March 7, 1862, Pea Ridge Ark. Resigned for ill health Oct. 11, 1862
- Ferdinand S. Winslow. Residence Marion. Appointed Quartermaster Sept. 4, 1861. Mustered Sept. 24, 1861. Promoted Assistant United States Quartermaster, with rank as captain, Jan. 30, 1862.
- Jerome Bradley. Residence Dubuque, nativity Massachusetts. Appointed Quartermaster March 16, 1862, from Second Lieutenant of Battery. Commission declined March 16, 1862. Appears to have been appointed Captain A.Q.M. Volunteers Feb 19, 1863. See Official Army Registers, 1861-1867
- Benjamin McClure. Appointed Surgeon Sept. 19, 1861. Mustered Oct. 11, 1861. Promoted Assistant Surgeon of Volunteers Feb 4, 1864; Surgeon of Volunteers Sept. 30, 1864.

== Medal of Honor Awardee ==
Sergeant James M. Elson (later Lieutenant) received the Medal of Honor for his action during the Siege of Vicksburg. His citation notes that Elson, "Carried the colors in advance of his regiment and was shot down while attempting to plant them on the enemy's works."

== Flags ==
They were given their regimental flags in 1862, they were made after the Battle of Pea Ridge. The banners were constructed by a group of women from Massachusetts.

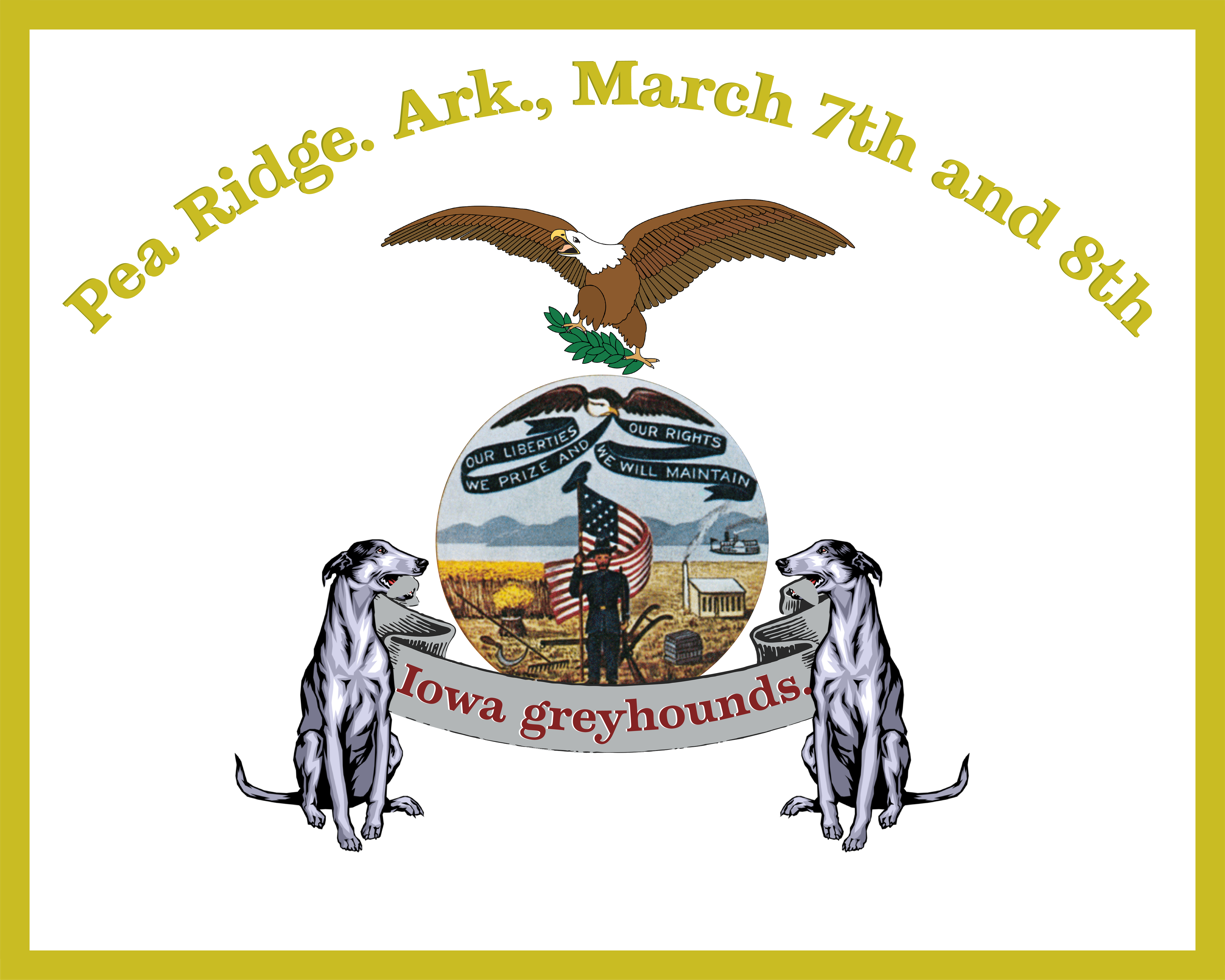
Digital reconstruction of the regimental flag (Obverse)

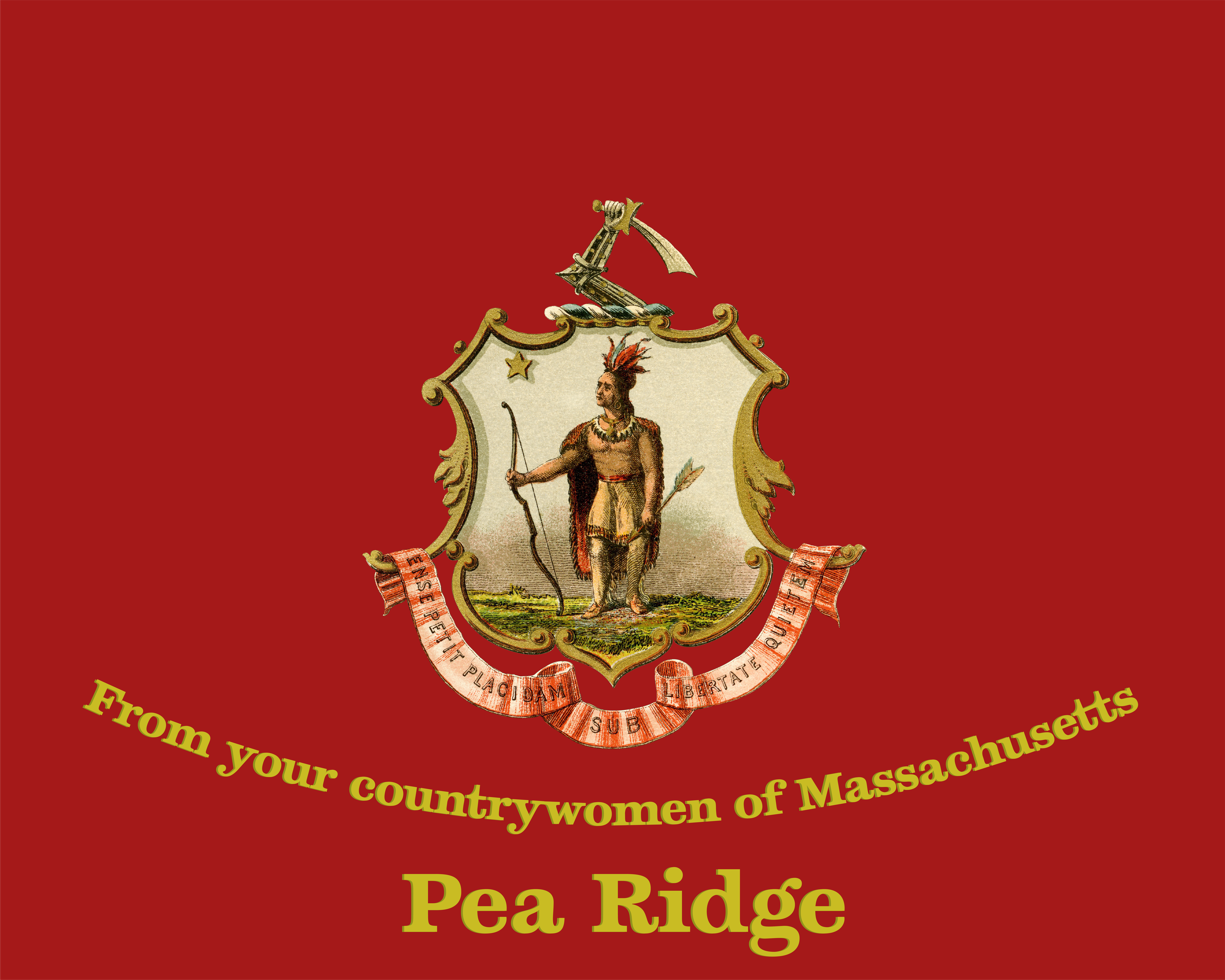
(Reverse)

== See also ==
- List of Iowa Civil War Units
- Iowa in the American Civil War
