= Sierra Diablo =

Mountain range in the Western United States

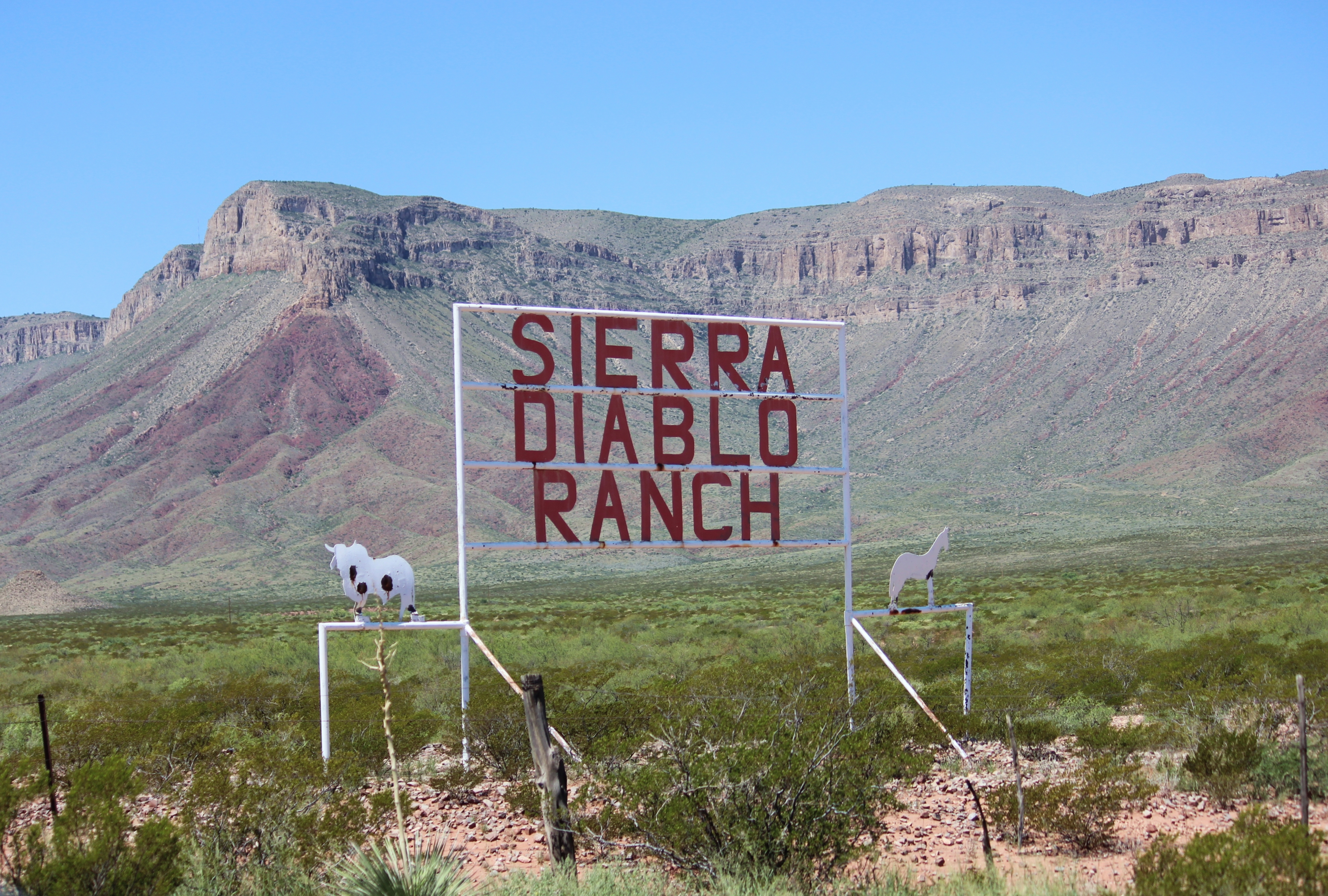
- Sierra Diablo range with eponymous ranch marker in the foreground

Highest point
- Elevation: 6,610 ft (2,010 m)

Dimensions
- Length: 43 mi (69 km)
- Width: 33 mi (53 km)

Naming
- Etymology: Spanish for "devil mountain range"

Geography
- Location within Texas
- Country: United States
- States: Texas
- Range coordinates: 31°25′00″N 104°54′00″W

The Sierra Diablo is a small mountain range in the US state of Texas, extending north and south along the border between Hudspeth and Culberson counties. It is in the Chihuahuan Desert, and is near Van Horn, Texas.

== Geography ==
The Sierra Diablo are a high mountainous plateau in West Texas. The highest peak in the range is 6,610 feet in elevation. The surface of the range slopes gently westward from its crest, but to the east, north, and south there are abrupt escarpments as high as 2,000 feet.

The range contains the Sierra Diablo Wildlife Management Area, designated in 1945 to conserve the last remaining desert bighorn sheep in Texas.

The highest peak in the range is known as Diablo Rim.

== Geology ==
The oldest rocks of the region, exposed in the southern foothills, date from the Precambrian. The most extensively exposed rocks in the Sierra Diablo date from the Permian period, and are about 3,000 feet thick. They consist mostly of Hueco, Bone Spring and Victorio Peak limestones. The range was given its present form and outlines by Cenozoic era geologic events.

Copper and silver have been mined in the region. Tungsten and beryllium are present in small amounts. Groundwater is scarce.

== History ==
Indigenous Lipan Apache people of the region were driven away and killed in the Battle of the Diablo Mountains in 1854 under the command of John George Walker. A last conflict of the Texas–Indian wars took place at Sierra Diablo in 1880, with Apache under the command of Victorio versus Texas Rangers under George W. Baylor. The site of the battle is now named Victorio Peak.

Dead bodies of two women were discovered in the mountains in 1938. The unsolved murders have been attributed by a reporter to a ring of Nazi spies operating in America.

A portion of the range is owned by Jeff Bezos, where a project known as Clock of the Long Now is being built inside a mountain.
