= Battle of Pea Ridge order of battle: Confederate =

These are the units and commanders who fought for the Confederacy in the Battle of Pea Ridge. The Pea Ridge Union order of battle is shown separately.

== Abbreviations used ==
=== Military rank ===
- MG = Major general
- BG = Brigadier general
- Col = Colonel
- Ltc = Lieutenant colonel
- Maj = Major
- Cpt = Captain
- Lt = Lieutenant

=== Other ===
- w = wounded
- mw = mortally wounded
- k = killed
- c = captured
- - = not reported, unknown

== Army of the West ==
Maj. Gen. Earl Van Dorn

=== Right Wing ===
Right Wing of the Army of the West
Division	Brigade	Unit	Commander	Killed	Wounded	Missing	Casualties
McCulloch's Division; BG Benjamin McCulloch (k); BG James M. McIntosh (k); Col Elkanah Greer; BG Albert Pike	Hébert's Infantry Brigade; Col Louis Hébert (c); Col Evander McNair (5,700 infantry)	3rd Louisiana Infantry Regiment	Maj Will F. Tunnard (c); Cpt W.L. Gunnells	10	15	42	67
McCulloch's Division; BG Benjamin McCulloch (k); BG James M. McIntosh (k); Col Elkanah Greer; BG Albert Pike	Hébert's Infantry Brigade; Col Louis Hébert (c); Col Evander McNair (5,700 infantry)	4th Arkansas Infantry Regiment	Col Evander McNair; Ltc Samuel Ogden	16	38	0	54
McCulloch's Division; BG Benjamin McCulloch (k); BG James M. McIntosh (k); Col Elkanah Greer; BG Albert Pike	Hébert's Infantry Brigade; Col Louis Hébert (c); Col Evander McNair (5,700 infantry)	14th Arkansas Infantry Regiment (Powers')	Col William C. Mitchell (c)	-	-	-	-
McCulloch's Division; BG Benjamin McCulloch (k); BG James M. McIntosh (k); Col Elkanah Greer; BG Albert Pike	Hébert's Infantry Brigade; Col Louis Hébert (c); Col Evander McNair (5,700 infantry)	15th Arkansas Infantry Regiment	Col Dandridge McRae	10	16	8	34
McCulloch's Division; BG Benjamin McCulloch (k); BG James M. McIntosh (k); Col Elkanah Greer; BG Albert Pike	Hébert's Infantry Brigade; Col Louis Hébert (c); Col Evander McNair (5,700 infantry)	16th Arkansas Infantry Regiment	Col John F. Hill	-	-	-	-
McCulloch's Division; BG Benjamin McCulloch (k); BG James M. McIntosh (k); Col Elkanah Greer; BG Albert Pike	Hébert's Infantry Brigade; Col Louis Hébert (c); Col Evander McNair (5,700 infantry)	17th (Griffith's) Arkansas Infantry Regiment	Col Frank A. Rector	5	9	12	26
McCulloch's Division; BG Benjamin McCulloch (k); BG James M. McIntosh (k); Col Elkanah Greer; BG Albert Pike	Hébert's Infantry Brigade; Col Louis Hébert (c); Col Evander McNair (5,700 infantry)	1st Arkansas Mounted Rifles (dismounted)	Col Thomas J. Churchill	5	0	0	5
McCulloch's Division; BG Benjamin McCulloch (k); BG James M. McIntosh (k); Col Elkanah Greer; BG Albert Pike	Hébert's Infantry Brigade; Col Louis Hébert (c); Col Evander McNair (5,700 infantry)	2nd Arkansas Mounted Rifles (dismounted)	Col Benjamin T. Embry	4	15	8	27
McCulloch's Division; BG Benjamin McCulloch (k); BG James M. McIntosh (k); Col Elkanah Greer; BG Albert Pike	Hébert's Infantry Brigade; Col Louis Hébert (c); Col Evander McNair (5,700 infantry)	4th Texas Cavalry Battalion (dismounted)	Maj John W. Whitfield	7	3	4	14
McCulloch's Division; BG Benjamin McCulloch (k); BG James M. McIntosh (k); Col Elkanah Greer; BG Albert Pike	McIntosh's Cavalry Brigade; BG James M. McIntosh (k); Col Elkanah Greer (3,000 cavalry)	3rd Texas Cavalry Regiment	Col Elkanah Greer; Ltc Walter P. Lane	2	12	0	14
McCulloch's Division; BG Benjamin McCulloch (k); BG James M. McIntosh (k); Col Elkanah Greer; BG Albert Pike	McIntosh's Cavalry Brigade; BG James M. McIntosh (k); Col Elkanah Greer (3,000 cavalry)	6th Texas Cavalry Regiment	Col B. Warren Stone	3	3	13	19
McCulloch's Division; BG Benjamin McCulloch (k); BG James M. McIntosh (k); Col Elkanah Greer; BG Albert Pike	McIntosh's Cavalry Brigade; BG James M. McIntosh (k); Col Elkanah Greer (3,000 cavalry)	9th Texas Cavalry Regiment	Col William B. Sims (w); Ltc William Quayle	1	1	0	2
McCulloch's Division; BG Benjamin McCulloch (k); BG James M. McIntosh (k); Col Elkanah Greer; BG Albert Pike	McIntosh's Cavalry Brigade; BG James M. McIntosh (k); Col Elkanah Greer (3,000 cavalry)	11th Texas Cavalry Regiment	Col William C. Young	-	-	-	-
McCulloch's Division; BG Benjamin McCulloch (k); BG James M. McIntosh (k); Col Elkanah Greer; BG Albert Pike	McIntosh's Cavalry Brigade; BG James M. McIntosh (k); Col Elkanah Greer (3,000 cavalry)	1st Arkansas Cavalry Battalion (Stirman's)	Maj William H. Brooks	11	30	0	41
McCulloch's Division; BG Benjamin McCulloch (k); BG James M. McIntosh (k); Col Elkanah Greer; BG Albert Pike	McIntosh's Cavalry Brigade; BG James M. McIntosh (k); Col Elkanah Greer (3,000 cavalry)	1st Texas Cavalry Battalion	Maj R. Phillip Crump	-	-	-	-
McCulloch's Division; BG Benjamin McCulloch (k); BG James M. McIntosh (k); Col Elkanah Greer; BG Albert Pike	Artillery (18 guns)	Hart's Arkansas Battery; 4 6-pounder guns	Cpt William Hart	-	-	-	-
McCulloch's Division; BG Benjamin McCulloch (k); BG James M. McIntosh (k); Col Elkanah Greer; BG Albert Pike	Artillery (18 guns)	Provence's Arkansas Battery; 2 6-pounder guns & 2 12-pounder howitzers	Cpt David Provence	-	-	-	-
McCulloch's Division; BG Benjamin McCulloch (k); BG James M. McIntosh (k); Col Elkanah Greer; BG Albert Pike	Artillery (18 guns)	Gaines' Arkansas Battery; 2 12-pounder rifled guns & 2 12-pounder howitzers	Cpt James J. Gaines	-	-	-	-
McCulloch's Division; BG Benjamin McCulloch (k); BG James M. McIntosh (k); Col Elkanah Greer; BG Albert Pike	Artillery (18 guns)	Good's Texas Battery; 4 12-pounder field guns & 2 12-pounder howitzers	Cpt John Jay Good	1	14	2	17
Pike's Brigade	Pike's Indian Brigade; BG Albert Pike (2,500 cavalry)	1st Cherokee Mounted Rifles	Col John Drew	2	1	0	3
Pike's Brigade	Pike's Indian Brigade; BG Albert Pike (2,500 cavalry)	2nd Cherokee Mounted Rifles	Col Stand Watie	-	-	-	-
Pike's Brigade	Pike's Indian Brigade; BG Albert Pike (2,500 cavalry)	1st Choctaw and Chickasaw (not engaged)	Col Douglas H. Cooper	-	-	-	-
Pike's Brigade	Pike's Indian Brigade; BG Albert Pike (2,500 cavalry)	1st Creek Mounted Rifles (not engaged)	Col Daniel N. McIntosh	-	-	-	-
Pike's Brigade	Pike's Indian Brigade; BG Albert Pike (2,500 cavalry)	Welch's Texas Cavalry Squadron	Cpt Otis G. Welch	-	-	-	-
Unassigned Units	Not Brigaded	19th Arkansas Infantry Regiment (Dawson's) (not engaged)	Ltc P. R. Smith	-	-	-	-
Unassigned Units	Not Brigaded	20th Arkansas Infantry Regiment (not engaged)	Col. George W. King	-	-	-	-

=== Left Wing (Missouri State Guard) ===
MG Sterling Price (w)

At the beginning of 1862, Price commanded about 8,000 soldiers. About half of these soldiers were organized as the 1st, 2nd, and 3rd Missouri Brigades while the rest remained in seven Missouri State Guard "Divisions" that were hardly larger than regiments.

Left Wing of the Army of the West
Division	Brigade	Unit	Commander	Killed	Wounded	Missing	Casualties
First (Price's) Division; MG Sterling Price (w)	Headquarters	Cearnal's Missouri Cavalry Battalion	Ltc James T. Cearnal (w); Maj D. Todd Samuels	2	6	12	20
First (Price's) Division; MG Sterling Price (w)	First Missouri Brigade; Col Lewis Henry Little	2nd Missouri Infantry	Col John Q. Burbridge	-	-	-	-
First (Price's) Division; MG Sterling Price (w)	First Missouri Brigade; Col Lewis Henry Little	3rd Missouri Infantry	Col Benjamin A. Rives (k); Ltc James A. Pritchard	26	45	33	104
First (Price's) Division; MG Sterling Price (w)	First Missouri Brigade; Col Lewis Henry Little	1st Missouri Cavalry Regiment	Col Elijah Gates	-	-	-	-
First (Price's) Division; MG Sterling Price (w)	First Missouri Brigade; Col Lewis Henry Little	Wade's Missouri Artillery Battery; 2 6-pounder guns & 4 12-pound howitzers	Cpt William Wade	-	-	-	-
First (Price's) Division; MG Sterling Price (w)	First Missouri Brigade; Col Lewis Henry Little	Clark's Missouri Artillery Battery; 4 6-pounder guns	Cpt Samuel Churchill Clark (k); Lt James L. Farris	-	-	-	-
First (Price's) Division; MG Sterling Price (w)	Second Missouri Brigade; Col William Y. Slack (mw); Col Thomas H. Rosser	Hughes' Missouri Infantry Battalion	Col John T. Hughes	1	3	4	8
First (Price's) Division; MG Sterling Price (w)	Second Missouri Brigade; Col William Y. Slack (mw); Col Thomas H. Rosser	Bevier's Missouri Infantry Battalion	Maj Robert S. Bevier	3	8	4	15
First (Price's) Division; MG Sterling Price (w)	Second Missouri Brigade; Col William Y. Slack (mw); Col Thomas H. Rosser	Rosser's Missouri Infantry Battalion	Col Thomas H. Rosser	-	-	-	-
First (Price's) Division; MG Sterling Price (w)	Second Missouri Brigade; Col William Y. Slack (mw); Col Thomas H. Rosser	Riggins' Missouri Cavalry Battalion	Col George W. Riggins	-	-	-	-
First (Price's) Division; MG Sterling Price (w)	Second Missouri Brigade; Col William Y. Slack (mw); Col Thomas H. Rosser	Landis' Missouri Artillery Battery; 2 12-pounder howitzers & 2 24-pounder howitzers	Cpt John C. Landis	-	-	-	-
First (Price's) Division; MG Sterling Price (w)	Second Missouri Brigade; Col William Y. Slack (mw); Col Thomas H. Rosser	Jackson's Missouri Artillery Battery; 4 6-pounder guns	Cpt William Lucas	-	-	-	-
First (Price's) Division; MG Sterling Price (w)	Third Missouri Brigade; Col Colton Greene	Brigade was composed of parts of Col Thomas Freeman's Regiment, Ltc John A. Schnable's Regiment, Cpt L.C. Campbell's cavalry company and partially organized Missouri State Guard units transferring into Confederate service.	Col Thomas Freeman et al.	6	59	0	65
Missouri State Guard	Second Division; BG Martin E. Green; Guarding army's trains	Unidentified infantry and cavalry units	BG Martin E. Green	-	-	-	-
Missouri State Guard	Second Division; BG Martin E. Green; Guarding army's trains	Kneisley's Missouri Battery; 5 6-pounder and 12-pounder guns	Cpt James W. Kneisley	-	-	-	-
Missouri State Guard	Third Division; Col John Bullock Clark Jr.	1st Infantry	Maj John F. Rucker	1	5	5	11
Missouri State Guard	Third Division; Col John Bullock Clark Jr.	2nd Infantry	Col Congreve Jackson	5	17	15	47 (Note: This should sum to 37. It appears to be a typo in the source.)
Missouri State Guard	Third Division; Col John Bullock Clark Jr.	3rd Infantry	Maj Robert R. Hutchinson	1	20	6	27
Missouri State Guard	Third Division; Col John Bullock Clark Jr.	4th and 5th Infantry	Col J.A. Poindexter	3	37	7	47
Missouri State Guard	Third Division; Col John Bullock Clark Jr.	6th Infantry	Ltc Quinton Peacher	2	23	8	33
Missouri State Guard	Third Division; Col John Bullock Clark Jr.	Tull's Missouri Battery; 2 6-pounder rifled guns & 2 6-pounder guns	Cpt Francis M. Tull	-	-	-	-
Missouri State Guard	Fifth Division; Col James P. Saunders	Unidentified infantry and cavalry units	Col James P. Saunders	9	32	0	41
Missouri State Guard	Fifth Division; Col James P. Saunders	Kelley's Battery; 5 6-pounder and 12-pounder guns	Cpt Joseph Kelly	-	-	-	-
Missouri State Guard	Sixth Division; Maj D. Herndon Lindsay	Unidentified infantry and cavalry units	Maj D. Herndon Lindsay	13	34	0	47
Missouri State Guard	Sixth Division; Maj D. Herndon Lindsay	Gorham's Battery; 4 6-pounder guns	Cpt James C. Gorham	-	-	-	-
Missouri State Guard	Seventh and Ninth Divisions; BG Daniel M. Frost	7th: Unidentified infantry and cavalry units	BG Daniel M. Frost	-	-	-	-
Missouri State Guard	Seventh and Ninth Divisions; BG Daniel M. Frost	Guibor's Missouri Battery; 2 6-pounder guns & 2 12-pounder howitzers	Cpt Henry Guibor	-	-	-	-
Missouri State Guard	Seventh and Ninth Divisions; BG Daniel M. Frost	9th: Unidentified infantry and cavalry units	BG James H. McBride	-	-	-	-
Missouri State Guard	Seventh and Ninth Divisions; BG Daniel M. Frost	MacDonald's Missouri Battery; 1 6-pounder gun & 2 12-pounder howitzers	Cpt Emmett MacDonald	-	-	-	-
Missouri State Guard	Eighth Division; BG James S. Rains	1st Infantry	Col William H. Erwin	2	26	0	28
Missouri State Guard	Eighth Division; BG James S. Rains	2nd Infantry	Ltc John P. Bowman	-	-	-	-
Missouri State Guard	Eighth Division; BG James S. Rains	3rd Infantry	Ltc A. J. Pearcy	-	-	-	-
Missouri State Guard	Eighth Division; BG James S. Rains	4th Infantry	Ltc John M. Stemmons	-	-	-	-
Missouri State Guard	Eighth Division; BG James S. Rains	Shelby's Cavalry Company	Cpt Jo Shelby	-	-	-	-
Missouri State Guard	Eighth Division; BG James S. Rains	Bledsoe's Missouri Battery; 3 12-pounder Napoleons & 1 12-pounder gun	Lt Charles W. Higgins	-	-	-	-

== See also ==
- Indian cavalry

== Notes ==
Footnotes

Citations
