= Eugene Asa Carr =

American Union Army general (1830–1910)

Eugene Asa Niel Carr
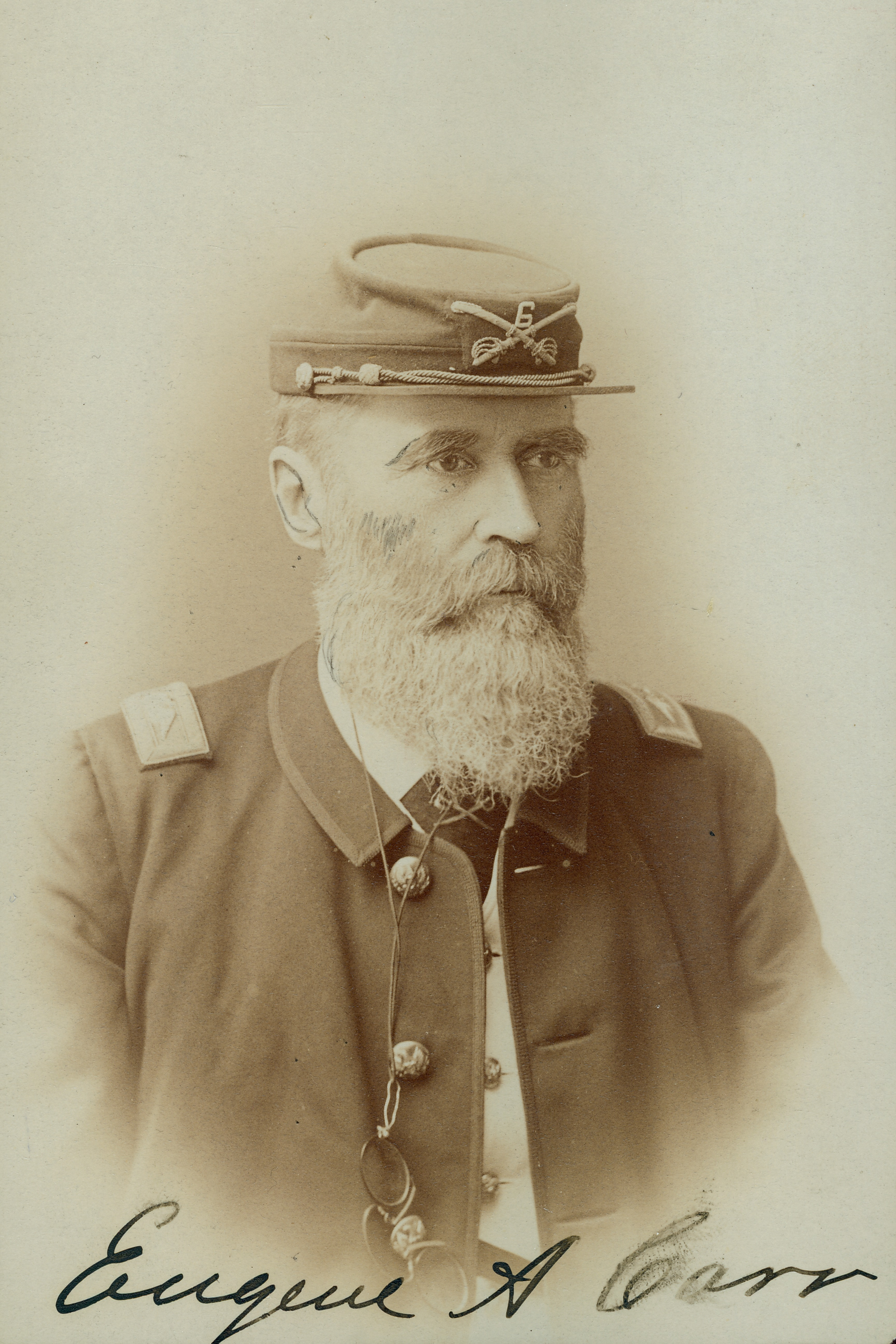
- Born: March 20, 1830; Hamburg, New York, US
- Died: December 2, 1910 (aged 80); Washington, D.C., US
- Burial place: West Point Cemetery
- Military career
- Allegiance: United States of America; Union
- Branch: United States Army; Union Army
- Service years: 1850–1893
- Rank: Brigadier General; Brevet Major General
- Unit: 3rd Regiment Illinois Volunteer Cavalry
- Commands: 3rd Regiment Illinois Volunteer Cavalry; Army of the Southwest; 6th Regiment U.S. Cavalry
- Conflicts: American Indian Wars; Rocky Mountains Campaign; Battle of the Diablo Mountains; Sioux Campaign; Bleeding Kansas; Utah War; American Civil War; Battle of Wilson's Creek; Battle of Pea Ridge; Battle of Port Gibson; Battle of Champion's Hill; Siege of Vicksburg; Camden Expedition; Battle of Spanish Fort; Battle of Fort Blakeley; American Indian Wars; Battle of Summit Springs; Battle of Slim Buttes; Battle of Cibecue Creek; Battle of Fort Apache
- Awards: Medal of Honor

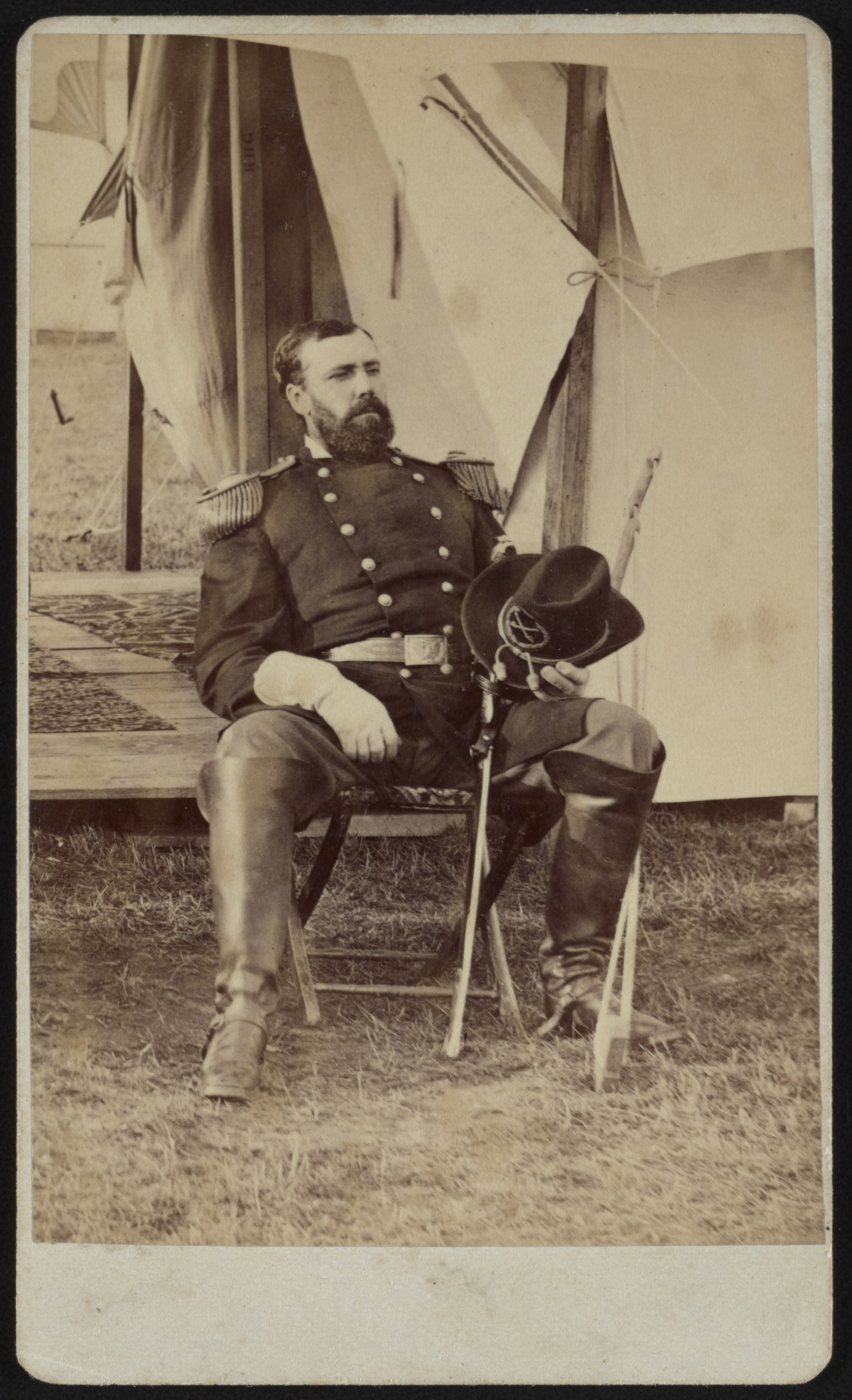
Major General Eugene Asa Carr of General Staff U.S. Volunteers Infantry Regiment, seated by a camp tent in uniform with sword. From the Liljenquist Family Collection of Civil War Photographs, Prints and Photographs Division, Library of Congress

Eugene Asa Niel Carr (March 20, 1830 – December 2, 1910) was a soldier in the United States Army and a general in the Union Army during the American Civil War. He was awarded the Medal of Honor for his actions at the Battle of Pea Ridge.

== Early life ==
Carr was born in Hamburg, New York. He graduated from the United States Military Academy at West Point, New York, in 1850, 19th in a class of 44 cadets. He was appointed a brevet second lieutenant in the Regiment of Mounted Riflemen and served in the Indian Wars until 1861. On October 3, 1854, Carr first saw combat in the Battle of the Diablo Mountains. By 1861, he had been promoted to captain (June 11, 1858) in the old 1st U.S. Cavalry (later designated the 4th U.S.) and command of Fort Washita in the Indian Territory.

== Civil War ==
During the Civil War, Carr's first combat was at the Battle of Wilson's Creek on August 10, 1861. He was appointed colonel of the 3rd Illinois Cavalry six days later and received a brevet promotion to lieutenant colonel in the regular army.

At the Battle of Pea Ridge in Arkansas, on March 7, 1862, Carr led the 4th Division of the Army of the Southwest in the fighting around Elkhorn Tavern. He was wounded in the neck, arm, and ankle and was later awarded a Medal of Honor for his actions. According to the official citation, Carr had "directed the deployment of his command and held his ground, under a brisk fire of shot and shell in which he was several times wounded." On April 30, 1862, President Abraham Lincoln appointed Carr brigadier general of volunteers, to rank from March 7, 1862. The President had submitted the nomination to the U.S. Senate on April 11, 1862, and the Senate had confirmed the appointment on April 28, 1862 Carr briefly commanded the Army of the Southwest from October 7 to November 12, 1863. He commanded the 2nd Division of the Army of Southeast Missouri before he and his division were transferred to the Army of the Tennessee as the 14th Division in the XIII Corps.

During the Vicksburg Campaign, Carr led the attack on Confederate forces at the Battle of Port Gibson. He fought in subsequent battles at Champion's Hill and Vicksburg. After the fall of Vicksburg, Carr was transferred back to Arkansas where he was placed in command of a division in the Army of Arkansas. Eventually, Carr commanded the Cavalry Division in the VII Corps during Frederick Steele's Camden Expedition. For the rest of 1864, he commanded the District of Little Rock. His final assignment of the war was to command of the 3rd Division of the XVI Corps in preparation for the Union campaign against Mobile, Alabama, where he subsequently fought in the Battle of Fort Blakeley. On March 11, 1865, President Lincoln nominated and the U.S. Senate confirmed Carr for appointment to the brevet grade of major general of volunteers to rank from March 11, 1865. Carr was mustered out of the volunteers on January 15, 1866. On July 17, 1866, President Andrew Johnson nominated Carr for appointment to the brevet grade of major general, USA (regular army), to rank from March 13, 1865, and the U.S. Senate confirmed the appointment on July 23, 1866.

== Postbellum service ==
Subsequently, Carr stayed in the Regular Army and conducted successful operations on the frontier against the Indians, including leading the Republican River Expedition in Kansas, Nebraska, and Colorado to a victory over the Cheyenne at the Battle of Summit Springs. He became Colonel of the 6th Cavalry Regiment in 1879; and Brigadier General in 1892. He was in command at the incident at Cibecue Creek with the Apache in 1881. He was the last commander of the District of New Mexico from November 26, 1888, to September 1, 1890.

Carr finally retired in 1893. His military nickname was "The Black-Bearded Cossack". Carr died in Washington, D.C. in 1910 and is buried in the West Point Cemetery, New York.

== Medal of Honor citation ==
Rank and organization: Colonel, 3d Illinois Cavalry. Place and date: At Pea Ridge, Ark., March 7, 1862. Entered service at: Hamburg, Erie County, N.Y. Born: March 10, 1830, Boston Corner, Erie County, N.Y. Date of issue: January 16, 1894.

Citation:

Directed the deployment of his command and held his ground, under a brisk fire of shot and shell in which he was several times wounded.

== See also ==
- List of Medal of Honor recipients
- List of American Civil War Medal of Honor recipients: A–F
- List of American Civil War generals (Union)
