= William Plummer Benton =

American lawyer and soldier

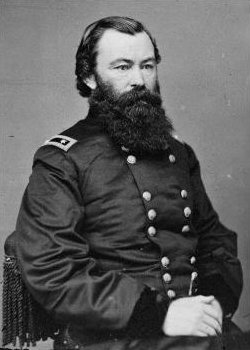
- Major General William P. Benton
- Born: December 25, 1828; New Market, Maryland, US
- Died: March 14, 1867 (aged 38); New Orleans, Louisiana, US
- Burial place: Greenwood Cemetery, New Orleans, Louisiana
- Military career
- Allegiance: United States of America; Union
- Branch: United States Army; Union Army
- Service years: 1846–1848, 1861–1865
- Rank: Brigadier General; Brevet Major General
- Conflicts: Mexican–American War; American Civil War

William Plummer Benton (December 25, 1828 – March 14, 1867) was an American lawyer and soldier who served in both the Mexican–American War and the American Civil War, where he would rise to the rank of brigadier general and, in 1866, after his service had ended, would be awarded the brevet grade of major general.

== Early life ==
Benton was born in New Market, Maryland. His father died when he was four months old and in 1836, he moved with his mother to Richmond, Indiana. Beginning at age 15, Benton spent 2–3 years in Cincinnati as a chairmaker. When Benton was 18 years old, he enlisted as a private in the Mexican War, and fought with gallantry in the mounted infantry at Contreras, Churubusco, Chapultepec and Mexico City.

Returning to Richmond at the war's end, he entered college to study law. He was admitted to the bar in Indiana in 1851 and began practice with Charles Clark. In 1852, he was elected district attorney of Wayne County on the Whig ticket and served until 1854. In 1854, he formed a partnership with J. B. Julian which continued until 1856, when he was elected judge of the Common pleas court, serving one term, until defeated for renomination in 1858.

In 1855, Benton was married to Sarah A. Wiggins, daughter of Daniel A. Wiggins of Richmond. He and Sarah had three children, Walter, Jessie, and Mary. His wife died of consumption in 1861 at the age of 27.

== Civil war ==
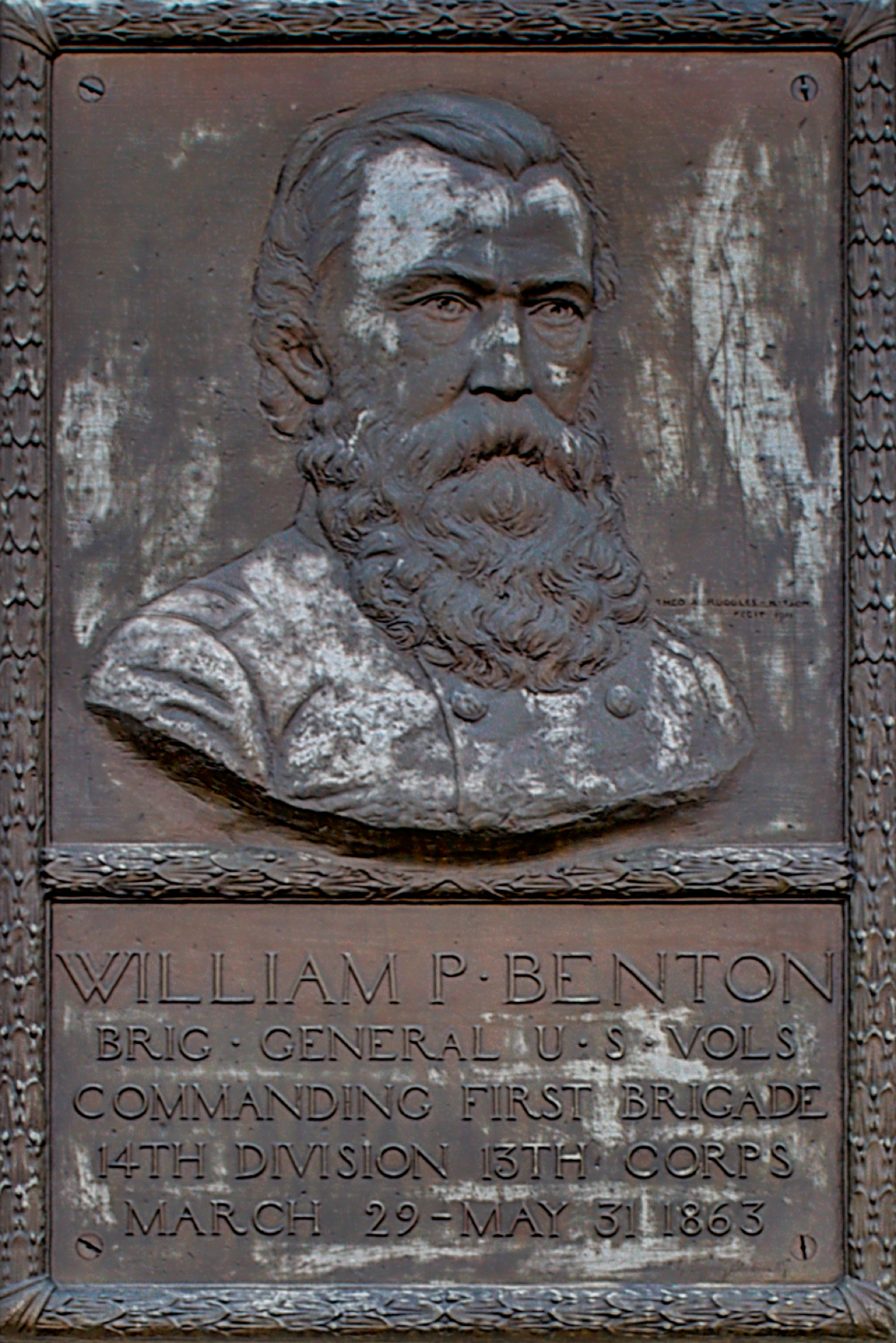
Relief portrait by Theo Alice Ruggles Kitson at Vicksburg National Military Park

Benton raised the first company from Wayne County following Lincolns call for 75,000 volunteers. He was its captain when the company became part of the 8th Indiana Volunteer Infantry Regiment, but was elected the regiment's colonel. He led the 8th Indiana in some the earliest fighting of the war during McClellan's Western Virginia campaign of 1861, including the Battle of Rich Mountain.

The regiment was then ordered to Missouri. Benton is said to have commanded a brigade at the Battle of Pea Ridge, although the Official Records lists another officer as the official commander, a member of the 33rd Illinois Volunteer Infantry Regiment described as "lacking in the fundamental requisites of leadership". While in Missouri, he was remarried to a war widow, Emma Adolphin Lenhart, after a ten-day courtship. (Emma's first husband, Dr. William Pettit, was killed in 1962 in Arkansas while transporting slaves to safe haven.) Also while in Missouri, future Buffalo Soldier Cathay Williams was impressed into serving Plummer's regiment, the 8th Indiana, as cook and laundress. At the Battle of Cotton Plant in July 1862, he led a brigade. His troops came on the field after most of the fighting was over and helped rout the beaten Confederate force.

In April 1862 Benton was promoted to brigadier general of volunteers. He served with distinction at the Battles of Port Gibson, Jackson (where he was wounded), Champion Hill, Big Black River, and at the Siege of Vicksburg.

He then served in various district commands with the XIII Corps in Texas and Louisiana throughout 1864, until he commanded a division in the campaign against Mobile, Alabama in early 1865. Benton was mustered out of the volunteer service on July 24, 1865. On January 13, 1866, President Andrew Johnson nominated Benton for the award of the brevet grade of major general of volunteers, to rank from March 26, 1865, and the U.S. Senate confirmed the award on March 12, 1866.

== Last years ==
After the war, Benton was appointed the Collector of Internal Revenue in the City of New Orleans. However, he died of yellow fever on March 14, 1867. He was interred at Greenwood Cemetery. Benton was a Freemason and member of Webb Lodge No. 24 at Richmond, Indiana, and King Solomon Chapter No 4 Royal Arch Masons in New Orleans.

== See also ==
- List of American Civil War generals (Union)
