= Army of the Southwest =

Union Army from the American Civil War

- Country: United States of America
- Branch: United States Army
- Engagements: American Civil War

The Army of the Southwest was a Union Army that served in the Trans-Mississippi Theater during the American Civil War. This force was also known as the Army of Southwest Missouri.

== History ==
=== Army of the Southwest ===
Created on Christmas Day, 1861, the Army of the Southwest was the field unit of the Dist. of Southwest Missouri, composed of troops from the Department of Missouri. The principal commander of the army was Brigadier General Samuel R. Curtis, but several other officers commanded the army for brief periods of time later in the war.

When Curtis assumed command of the Army there were three divisions commanded by Brig. Gen. Franz Sigel, Brig. Gen. Alexander Asboth and Col. Jefferson C. Davis. Sigel felt he had been passed over for command of the army and threatened to resign. More than half the Army of the Southwest was composed of German immigrants and Sigel (a German) carried a great deal of influence with them. Wishing to appease Sigel when he organized the army, Curtis named Sigel second-in-command and placed him in overall command of the 1st and 2nd Divisions which were composed of mostly German immigrants. Colonel Peter J. Osterhaus (another German immigrant) assumed command of the 1st Division and Gen. Alexander Asboth (a Hungarian immigrant) retained command of the 2nd Division. This left Col. Davis' 3rd Division as the only division composed of native born units (mostly from Midwestern States). So Curtis created the 4th Division with Colonel Eugene A. Carr in command to bring an ethnic balance to the army.

Curtis led the army into its greatest engagement of the war at the Battle of Pea Ridge. After capturing Helena, Arkansas, later that year, the army ceased to be of great significance for the rest of the war.

The 1st Division, now commanded by Frederick Steele was eventually transferred to the Army of the Tennessee after a brief stint in the Dist. of Eastern Arkansas. Asboth's 2nd Division and Davis' 3rd Division were transferred to the Army of Mississippi during the siege of Corinth.

=== Army of Southeast Missouri ===
On December 3, 1862, much of the 4th Division was re-designated the Army of Southeast Missouri under the command of General John W. Davidson. This formation had two divisions commanded respectively by Col. William P. Benton and Col. Chester A. Harding, Jr. (later General Carr). This army was short-lived as the troops were transferred to the Army of the Tennessee in preparation for the Vicksburg campaign, where they became part of the 14th Division, XIII Corps under the command of General Carr.

== Commanders ==
- Major General Samuel R. Curtis (December 25, 1861 – August 29, 1862)
- Major General Frederick Steele (August 29, 1862 – October 7, 1862)
- Major General Eugene A. Carr (October 7, 1862 – November 12, 1862)
- Major General Willis A. Gorman (November 12, 1862–December 13, 1862) Also in command of the Dist of Eastern Arkansas from December 3

== Major Battles ==
- Battle of Pea Ridge (Curtis)
- Battle of Cotton Plant (Curtis) only units from the 1st Division were engaged
- Capture of Helena (Curtis)

== See also ==
- Pea Ridge Union order of battle
