= Missouri in the American Civil War =

Coordinates: 38.5°N 92.5°W

During the American Civil War, Missouri was a hotly contested southern border state populated by both Union and Confederate sympathizers. It sent armies, generals, and supplies to both sides, maintained dual governments, and endured a bloody neighbor-against-neighbor intrastate war within the larger national war.

A slave state since statehood in 1821, Missouri's geographic position in the central region of the country and at the rural edge of the American frontier ensured that it remained a divisive battleground for competing Northern and Southern ideologies in the years preceding the war. When the war began in 1861, it became clear that control of the Mississippi River and the burgeoning economic hub of St. Louis would make Missouri a strategic territory in the Trans-Mississippi Theater.

By the end of the war in 1865, nearly 110,000 Missourians had served in the Union Army and at least 40,000 in the Confederate Army; many had also fought with bands of pro–Confederate partisans known as "bushwhackers". The war in Missouri was continuous between 1861 and 1865, with battles and skirmishes in all areas of the state, from the Iowa and Illinois borders in the northeast to the Arkansas border in the southeast and southwest. Counting minor actions and skirmishes, Missouri saw more than 1,200 distinct engagements within its boundaries; only Virginia and Tennessee exceeded this total.

The first major Civil War battle west of the Mississippi River took place on August 10, 1861, at Wilson's Creek, Missouri, while the largest battle west of the Mississippi River was the Battle of Westport in Kansas City in 1864.

== Origins ==
=== Missouri Compromise ===
Missouri was initially settled predominantly by Southerners, who traveled up the Mississippi River. Many brought slaves with them. Missouri entered the Union in 1821 as a slave state following the Missouri Compromise of 1820, in which Congress agreed that slavery would be illegal in all territory north of 36°30' latitude, except Missouri. The compromise was that Maine would enter the Union as a free state to balance Missouri. The compromise was proposed by Henry Clay.

=== Bleeding Kansas ===
The Underground Railroad, a network of safe houses through which runaway slaves could find protection and refuge while heading north, was already established in the state, and slave owners were worried about the possibility of Missouri's entire western border becoming a conduit for the Underground Railroad if adjacent territories were made free states.

In 1854, the Kansas–Nebraska Act nullified the policy set by the Missouri Compromise by permitting the Kansas and Nebraska Territories to vote on whether they would join the Union as free or slave states. The result was a de facto war between pro-slavery residents of Missouri, called "Border Ruffians", and anti-slavery "Free-Staters" of Kansas, each of which sought to influence how Kansas entered the Union. The conflict involved attacks and murders of supporters on both sides, with the Sacking of Lawrence by pro-slavery forces and the Pottawatomie massacre led by abolitionist John Brown the most notable. Kansas initially approved a pro-slavery constitution called the Lecompton Constitution, but after the U.S. Congress rejected it, the state approved the anti-slavery Wyandotte Constitution and was admitted to the Union in January 1861. The violence along the Kansas–Missouri border foreshadowed the national violence to come, and indeed continued throughout the Civil War.

=== Dred Scott decision ===
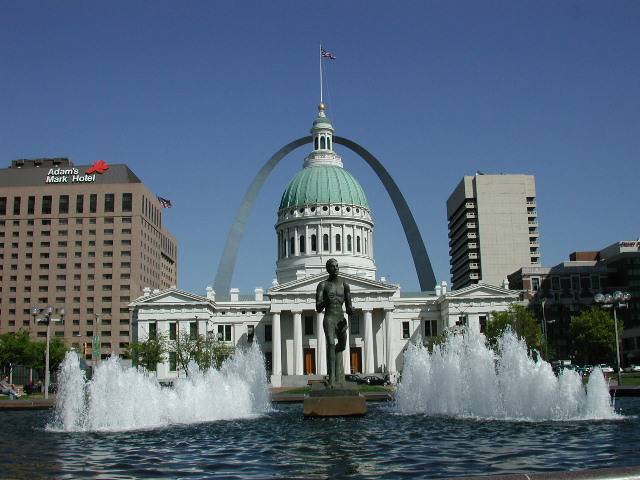
Old Courthouse in St. Louis where the Dred Scott case was argued

Against the background of Bleeding Kansas, the case of Dred Scott, a slave who in 1846 had sued for his family's freedom in St. Louis, reached the U.S. Supreme Court. In 1857, the Supreme Court handed down its decision, ruling not only that slaves were not automatically made free simply by entering a free state, but more controversially that no one of African ancestry was considered a U.S. citizen and therefore that African-Americans could not initiate legal action in any court, even when they clearly had what would otherwise be a valid claim. The decision calmed the skirmishes between Missouri and Kansas partisans, but its publicity enraged abolitionists nationwide and contributed to the vitriolic rhetoric that led to the Civil War. The judge present was Supreme Court Chief Justice Roger B. Taney.

=== Armed neutrality ===
By 1860, Missouri's initial southern settlers had been supplanted with a more diversified non-slave-holding population, including northerners and immigrants from Europe, particularly Germans and Irish. With war seeming inevitable, Missouri hoped to stay out of the conflict by remaining a part of the Union but militarily neutral – not sending men or supplies to either side and pledging to fight troops from either side who entered the state. The policy was first put forth in 1860 by outgoing Governor Robert Marcellus Stewart, who had Northern leanings. It was reaffirmed by incoming Governor Claiborne Fox Jackson, who had Southern leanings. Jackson, however, stated in his inaugural address that in case of federal "coercion" of southern states, Missouri should support and defend her "sister southern states". A Constitutional Convention to discuss secession was convened with Sterling Price presiding. The delegates voted to stay in the Union and supported the neutrality position.

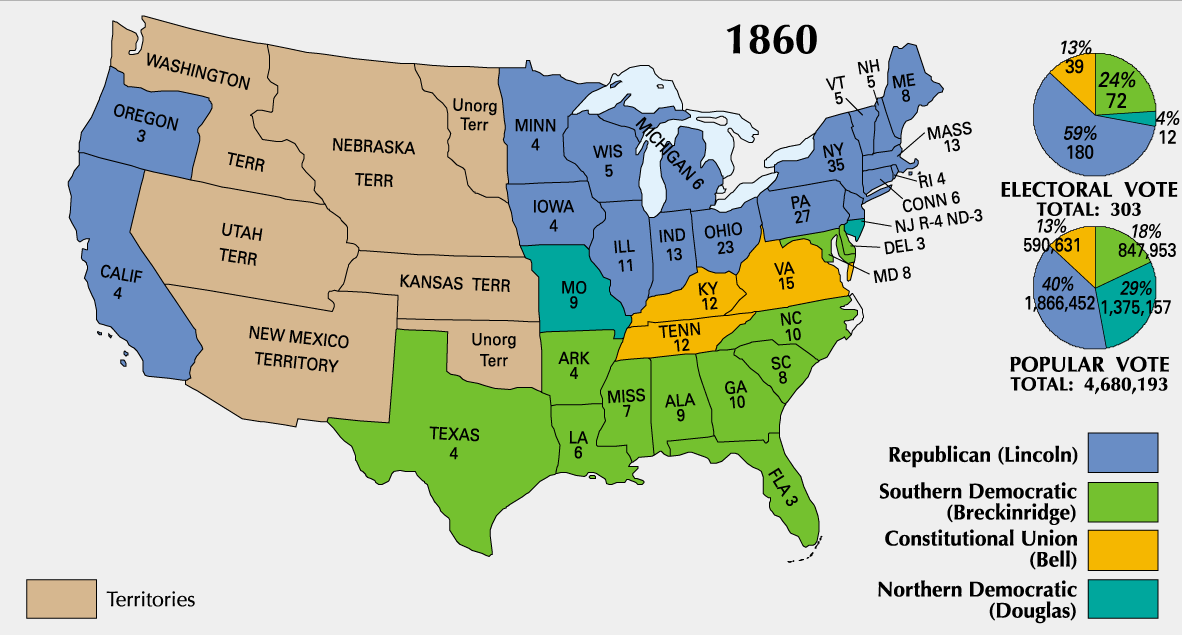
Presidential electoral votes by state in 1860

In the United States presidential election of 1860, Abraham Lincoln received only 10 percent of Missouri's votes, while 71 percent favored either John Bell or Stephen A. Douglas, both of whom wanted to maintain the status quo. Douglas won the Missouri vote over Bell, making it the only state Douglas carried outright (he also won the popular vote in New Jersey, but split that state's electoral votes with Lincoln), with the remaining 19 percent siding with Southern Democrat John C. Breckinridge.

At the time of the 1860 U.S. census, Missouri's total population was 1,182,012, of which 114,931 (9.7%) were slaves. Most of the slaves lived in rural areas rather than cities. Of the 299,701 responses to "Occupation", 124,989 people listed "Farmers" and 39,396 listed "Farm Laborers". The next highest categories were "Laborers" (30,668), "Blacksmiths" (4,349), and "Merchants" (4,245).

Less than half the state's population was listed as native-born (475,246, or 40%). Those who had migrated from other states were predominantly from Kentucky (99,814), Tennessee (73,504), Virginia (53,937), Ohio (35,380), Indiana (30,463), and Illinois (30,138), with fewer numbers from other states. 906,540 people (77%) were listed as born in the United States. Of the 160,541 foreign-born residents of Missouri, most came from the German states (88,487), Ireland (43,481), England (10,009), France (5,283), and Switzerland (4,585).

Most populous cities
Population	City
160,773	St. Louis
9,485	District No. 18 in Callaway County (Note: Fulton, by far the current largest city, was not listed in the printed list. Other cities/towns in Callaway were Bourbon (1,689); Cedar (1,639); Cotesansdissein (1,993); Liberty (1,448); and Round Prairie (955).)
8,932	St. Joseph
6,503	Hannibal
5,848	Central St. Louis County
4,789	St. Ferdinand in St. Louis County
4,474	Blue in Jackson County
4,418	Kansas City
4,122	Lexington

Most populous counties
Population	County
190,524	St. Louis County
23,861	Buchanan County
22,896	Jackson County
20,038	Lafayette County
19,486	Boone County
18,838	Marion County
18,417	Pike County
18,350	Platte County

Counties with the most slaves
Slaves	County
6,374	Lafayette County
5,886	Howard County
5,034	Boone County
4,876	Saline County
4,523	Callaway County
4,346	St. Louis County
4,055	Pike County
3,944	Jackson County
3,313	Platte County
3,021	Monroe County
3,017	Marion County

== Commencement of hostilities ==
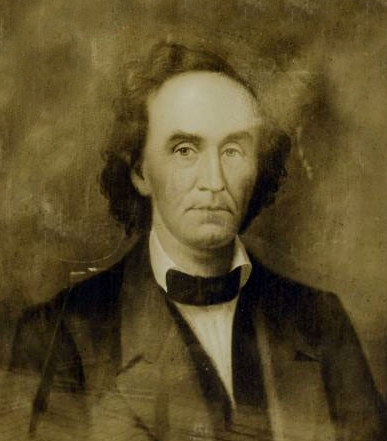
Governor Claiborne Fox Jackson

In the election of 1860, Missouri's newly elected governor was Claiborne Fox Jackson, a career politician and an ardent supporter of the South. Jackson campaigned as a Douglas Democrat, favoring a conciliatory program on issues that divided the country. After Jackson's election, however, he immediately began working behind the scenes to promote Missouri's secession. In addition to planning to seize the federal arsenal at St. Louis, Jackson conspired with senior Missouri bankers to illegally divert money from the banks to arm state troops, a measure that the Missouri General Assembly had so far refused to take.

=== The capture of Camp Jackson ===
Missouri's nominal neutrality was tested early on in a conflict over the St. Louis Arsenal. The Federal Government reinforced the Arsenal's tiny garrison with several detachments, most notably Company B of the US 2nd Infantry under Captain Nathaniel Lyon. The other federal arsenal in Missouri, Liberty Arsenal, had been captured on April 20, by secessionist militias. Concerned by widespread reports that Governor Jackson intended to use the Missouri Volunteer Militia to attack the St. Louis Arsenal and capture its stock of 39,000 small arms, Secretary of War Simon Cameron ordered Lyon (by that time a brevet general in acting command) to evacuate the majority of the munitions out of the state. 21,000 guns were secretly evacuated to Alton, Illinois, on the evening of April 29.

Lyon also organized a pro-Union "Home Guard", mainly composed of German immigrants. Many of these were "Forty-eighters" (radical political refugees).

Meanwhile, Governor Jackson called up the State Militia under Brigadier General Daniel M. Frost for maneuvers at Camp Jackson in suburban St. Louis. These maneuvers were recognized by Lyon as preparation to seize the Arsenal. Lyon learned that Confederate artillery had been secretly delivered to Camp Jackson on May 9. The next day, Lyon led the Home Guard to surprise Camp Jackson and capture the Militia. While the Militia were marching under guard to the Arsenal, a riot erupted. Lyon's troops opened fire on the attacking crowd, killing 28 people and injuring 100.

The next day, the Missouri General Assembly authorized the formation of a Missouri State Guard with Major General Sterling Price as its commander, supposedly to resist invasions from either side. However, Governor Claiborne and Price had both sent envoys requesting Confederate troops come to Missouri and aid in driving out the Union forces. William S. Harney, federal commander of the Department of the West, moved to quiet the situation by agreeing to Missouri neutrality in the Price-Harney Truce. This led to Confederate sympathizers taking over most of Missouri, with pro-Unionists being harassed and forced to leave. President Lincoln overruled the truce agreement and relieved Harney of command, replacing him with Lyon.

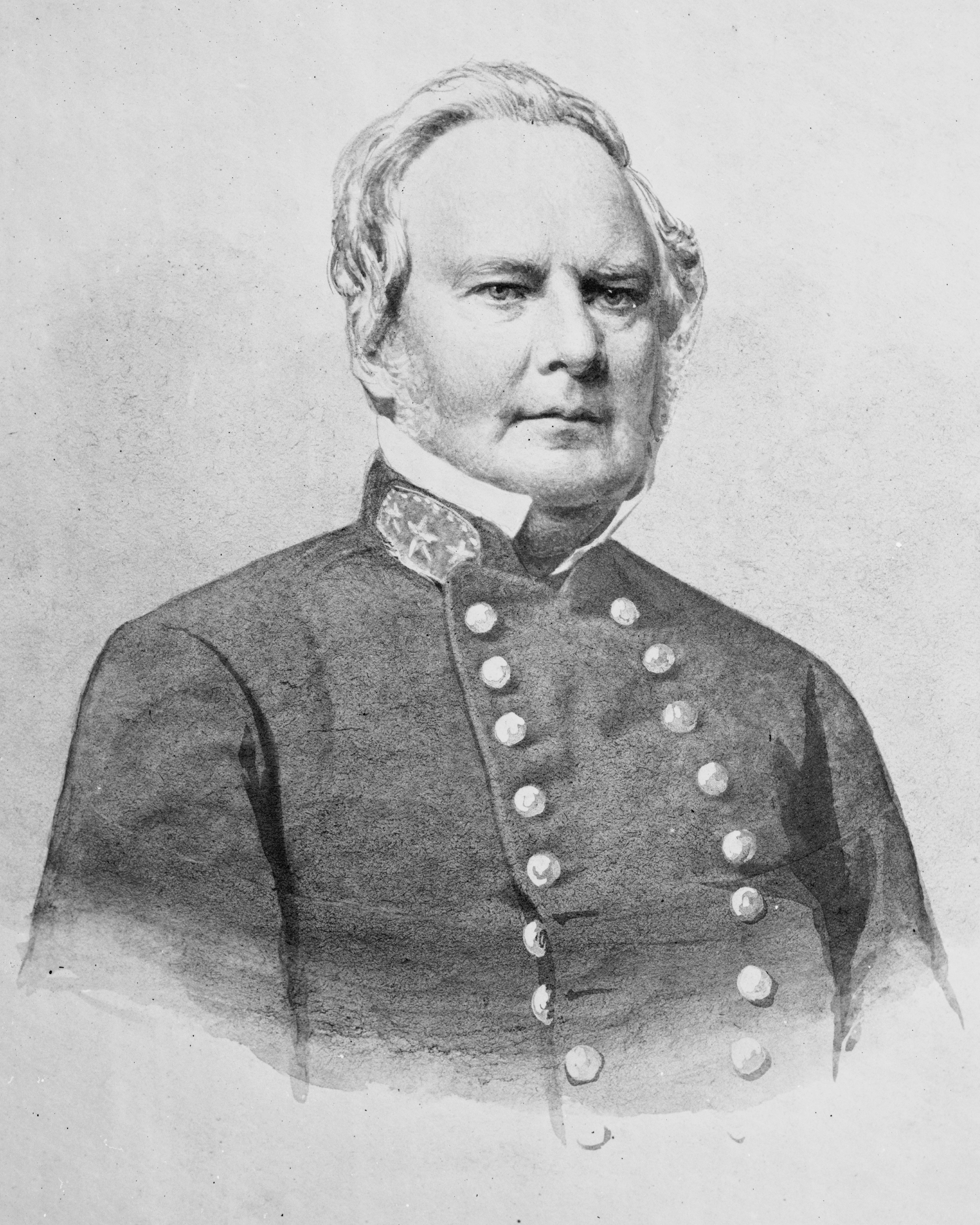
Maj. Gen. Sterling Price

On June 11, Lyon met with Governor Jackson and Price at St. Louis' Planter's House Hotel. The meeting, theoretically to discuss the possibility of continuing the Price-Harney Truce between U.S. and state forces, quickly deadlocked over basic issues of sovereignty and governmental power. Jackson and Price, who were working to construct the new Missouri State Guard in nine military districts statewide, wanted to contain the federal toe-hold to the Unionist stronghold of St. Louis. Jackson demanded that federal forces be limited to the boundaries of St. Louis, and that pro-Unionist Missouri "Home Guards" in several Missouri towns be disbanded. Lyon refused, and stated that if Jackson insisted on so limiting the power of the federal government, "This means war". Lyon marched into the state capital, Jefferson City, on June 15, and routed State Guard troops at Boonville on June 17. Jackson and other pro-Confederate politicians fled to the southern part of the state. Jackson and a rump of the General Assembly eventually set up a government-in-exile in Neosho, Missouri, and enacted an Ordinance of Secession. This government was recognized by the rest of the Confederacy despite the fact that the "Act" was not endorsed by a plebiscite (as required by Missouri state law) and that Jackson's government was all but powerless inside Missouri.

=== The Constitutional Convention ===
On July 22, 1861, following Lyon's capture of the Missouri capital at Jefferson City, the Missouri Constitutional Convention reconvened and declared the Missouri governor's office to be vacant. On July 28, it appointed former Missouri Supreme Court Chief Justice Hamilton Rowan Gamble as governor of the state and agreed to comply with Lincoln's demand for troops. The provisional Missouri government began organizing new pro-Union regiments. Some, like the 1st Missouri Cavalry Regiment, organized on September 6, 1861, fought through the entire Civil War. By the war's end, some 447 Missouri Regiments had fought for the Union, with many men serving in more than one regiment.

=== Missouri's government in exile ===
In October 1861, the remnants of the elected state government that favored the South, including Jackson and Price, met in Neosho and voted to formally secede from the Union. The measure gave them votes in the Confederate Congress, but otherwise was symbolic, since they did not control any part of the state. The exiled Southern state leadership was forced to move their capital to Marshall, Texas. When Jackson died in office in 1862, his lieutenant governor, Thomas Caute Reynolds, succeeded him.

== Early military actions, 1861–1862 ==
Military actions in Missouri are generally divided into three phases, starting with the Union removal of Governor Jackson and pursuit of Sterling Price and his Missouri State Guard in 1861; a period of neighbor-versus-neighbor bushwhacking guerrilla warfare from 1862 to 1864 (which actually continued long after the war had ended everywhere else, until at least 1889); and finally Sterling Price's attempt to retake the state in 1864.

=== Operations to control Missouri ===
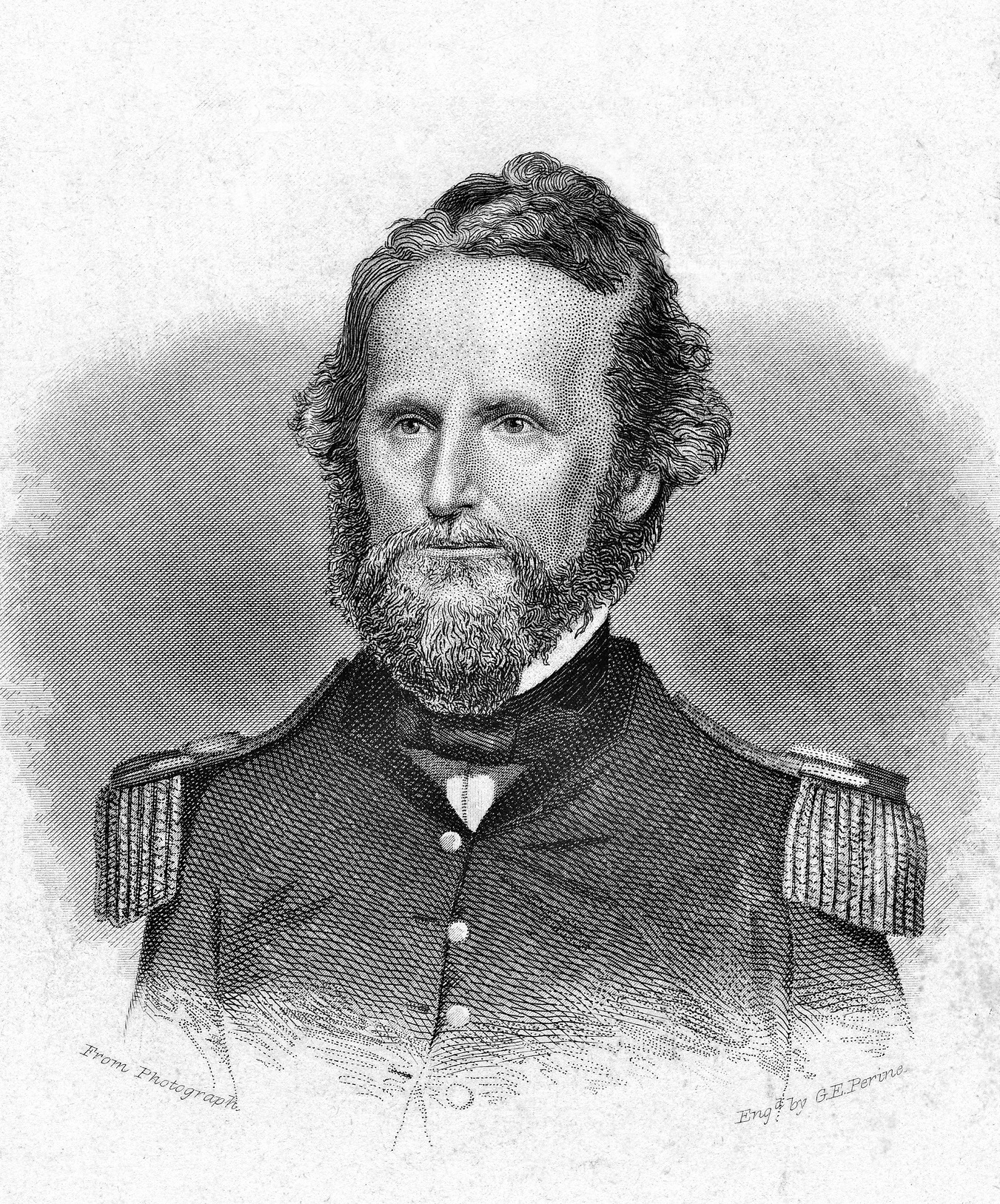
Nathaniel Lyon

The largest battle in the campaign to evict Jackson was the Battle of Wilson's Creek near Springfield, Missouri, on August 10, 1861. The battle marked the first time that the Missouri State Guard fought alongside Confederate forces. A combined force of over 12,000 Confederate soldiers, Arkansas State Troops, and Missouri State Guardsmen under Confederate Brigadier Benjamin McCulloch fought approximately 5,400 Federals in a punishing six-hour battle. Union forces suffered over 1,300 casualties, including Lyon, who was fatally shot. The Confederates lost 1,200 men. The exhausted Confederates did not closely pursue the retreating Federals. In the aftermath of the battle, Southern commanders disagreed as to the proper next step. Price argued for an invasion of Missouri. McCulloch, concerned about the security of Arkansas and Indian Territory and skeptical about finding enough supplies for his army in central Missouri, refused. The Confederate and Arkansas troops fell back to the border, while Price led his Guardsmen into northwestern Missouri to attempt to recapture the state.

Price's emboldened Missouri State Guard marched on Lexington, besieging Colonel James A. Mulligan's garrison at the Siege of Lexington on September 12–20. Deploying wet hemp bales as mobile breastworks, the rebel advance was shielded from fire, including heated shot. By early afternoon on the 20th, the rolling fortification had advanced close enough for the Southerners to take the Union works in a final rush. By 2:00 p.m., Mulligan had surrendered. Price was reportedly so impressed by Mulligan's demeanor and conduct during and after the battle that he offered him his own horse and buggy, and ordered him safely escorted to Union lines. Years later, in his book The Rise and Fall of the Confederate Government, Confederate president Jefferson Davis opined that "The expedient of the bales of hemp was a brilliant conception, not unlike that which made Tarik, the Saracen warrior, immortal, and gave his name to the northern pillar of Hercules."

The hopes of many Southern-leaning, mostly farming-dependent families, including Jesse James and family in Liberty, Missouri, rose and fell by news of Price's battles. "If Price succeeded, the entire state of Missouri might fall into the hands of the Confederacy. For all anyone knew, it would force Lincoln to accept the South's independence, in light of earlier rebel victories. After all, no one expected the war to last much longer." The Siege and Battle of Lexington, also called the Battle of the Hemp Bales, was a huge success for the rebels, and meant rebel ascendancy, albeit temporarily, in western and southwest Missouri. Combined with the loss of such a pivotal leader of the federals' western campaign in Nathaniel Lyon, and the Union's stunning defeat in the war's first major land battle at Bull Run, Missouri's secessionists were "jubilant". Exaggerated stories and rumors of Confederate successes spread easily in this era of slower, often equine-based communication. St. Louis' (ironically named) Unionist-Democrat Daily Missouri Republican reported some of the secessionist scuttlebutt a week after the rebel victory at Lexington:

A party with whom I have conversed, says no one has any idea how much the secession cause has been strengthened since PRICE'S march to Lexington, and particularly since its surrender. The rebels are jubilant, and swear they will drive the Federalists into the Missouri and Mississippi before two months are over.

A party of rebels recently stated that Lincoln had been hanged by Beauregard, and that for weeks past the National Congress had been held in Philadelphia.

Reports are rife in Western Missouri that the Southern Confederacy has been recognized by England and France, and that before the last of October the blockade will be broken by the navies of both nations. The rebels prophesy that before ten years have elapsed the Confederacy will be the greatest, most powerful, and prosperous, nation on the globe, and that the United States will decay, and be forced to seek the protection of England to prevent their being crushed by the South.

Rebel ascendancy in Missouri was short-lived, however, as General John C. Frémont quickly mounted a campaign to retake Missouri. And "without a single battle, the momentum suddenly shifted". On September 26, "Frémont moved west from St. Louis with an army of thirty-eight thousand. Soon, he arrived at Sedalia, southeast of Lexington, threatening to trap the rebels against the river." On September 29, Price was forced to abandon Lexington, and he and his men moved into southwest Missouri; "their commanders do not wish to run any risk, their policy being to make attacks only where they feel confident, through superiority of numbers, of victory." Price and his generals stuck firmly to this cautious strategy, and similar to General Joseph E. Johnston's retreat toward Atlanta, Price's Missouri State Guard fell back hundreds of miles in the face of a superior force. They soon retreated from the state and headed for Arkansas and later Mississippi.

Small remnants of the Missouri Guard remained in the state and fought isolated battles throughout the war. Price soon came under the direct command and control of the Confederate Army. In March 1862, any hopes for a new offensive in Missouri were dimmed with a decisive Union victory at the Battle of Pea Ridge just south of the border in Arkansas. The Missouri State Guard stayed largely intact as a unit through the war, but suffered heavy casualties in Mississippi in the Battle of Iuka and the Second Battle of Corinth.

=== Fremont's Proclamation ===
John C. Frémont replaced Lyon as commander of the Department of the West. A few weeks following the Battle of Wilson's Creek, he issued his namesake Proclamation, which imposed martial law in the state, threatened to execute prisoners of war, seize their property and, if they had any, free their slaves.

Missouri State Guard General M. Jeff Thompson threatened to execute a captured Union soldier for every Missourian executed by the proclamation. Lincoln, seeking to stop the senseless execution of prisoners of war by both sides, stopped the pending bloodshed by rescinding the proclamation.

=== Ironclad Navy and Riverine Campaigns ===
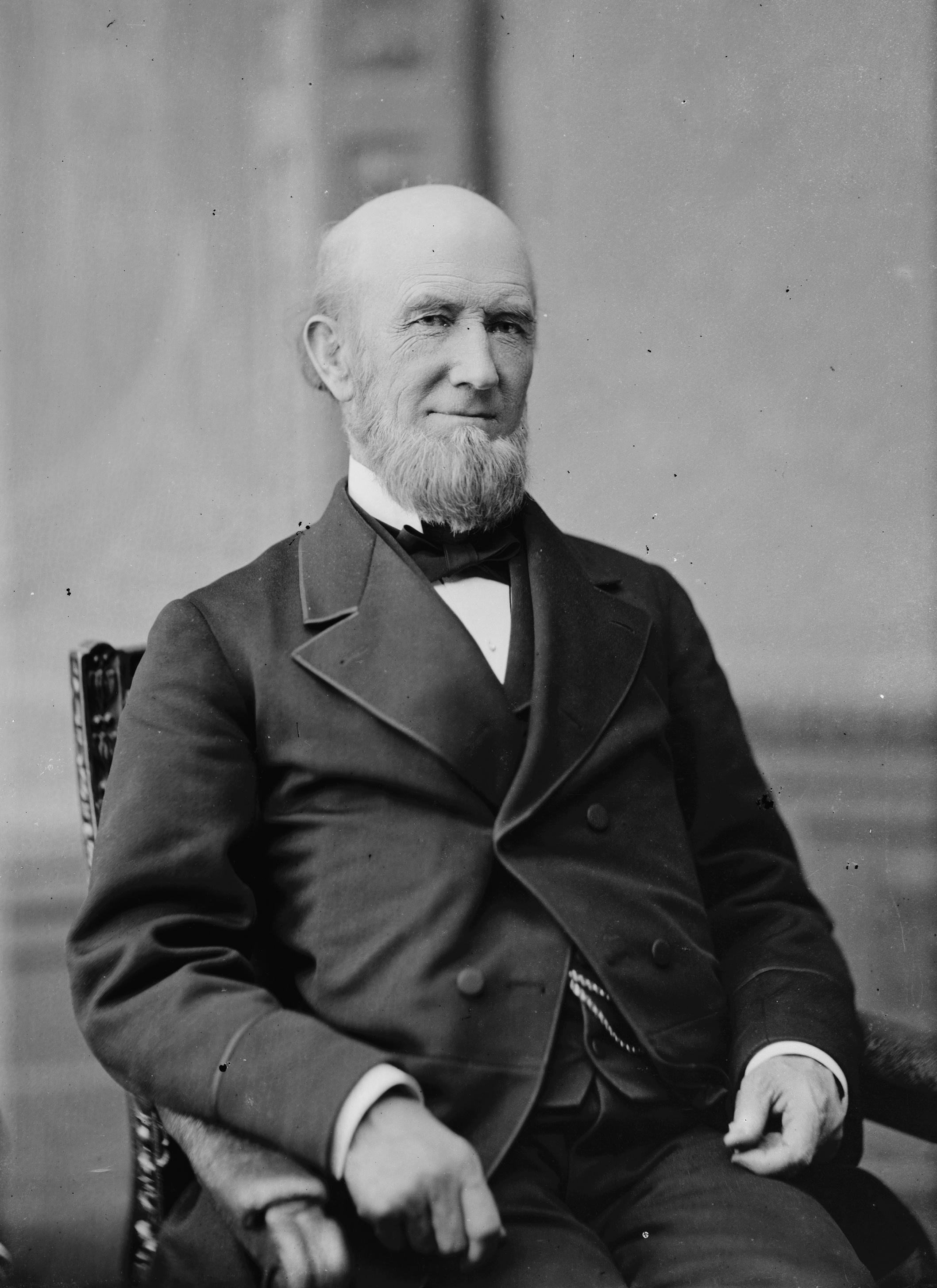
Captain James B. Eads

While various forces battled inconclusively for southwest Missouri, a unique cooperative effort between the U.S. Army, U.S. Navy, and civilian resources was established to build a brown-water navy. St. Louis river salvage expert and engineer James Buchanan Eads won a contract to build a fleet of shallow-draft ironclads for use on the western rivers. A cooperative relationship between Army officials, who would own the vessels, and Navy officers, who would command them, helped speed the work along. Drawing on his reputation and personal credit as well as that of St. Louis Unionists, Eads used subcontractors throughout the Midwest (and as far east as Pittsburgh) to produce nine ironclads in just over three months. Built at Eads' own Union Marine Works in the St. Louis suburb of Carondelet and at a satellite yard in Cairo, Illinois, the seven City-class ironclads, (Note: The City-class ironclads were named after river cities and towns: Cairo, Carondelet, Cincinnati, Louisville, Mound City, Pittsburgh, and St. Louis. They were initially commissioned by the War Department (Army) rather than the Navy, and even after transfer to Navy control were referred to as "U.S. Gunboat" rather than "United States Ship" (U.S.S.) in official correspondence. (In subsequent official U.S. Navy history, however, they are referred to as "U.S.S." and considered commissioned warships and part of fleet lineage.) When the river fleet was transferred to the Navy in the autumn of 1862, the U.S. Gunboat St. Louis was renamed Baron DeKalb, there already being a sloop-of-war named St. Louis in naval service.) Essex, and the heavy ironclad Benton were the first U.S. ironclads and the first to see combat.

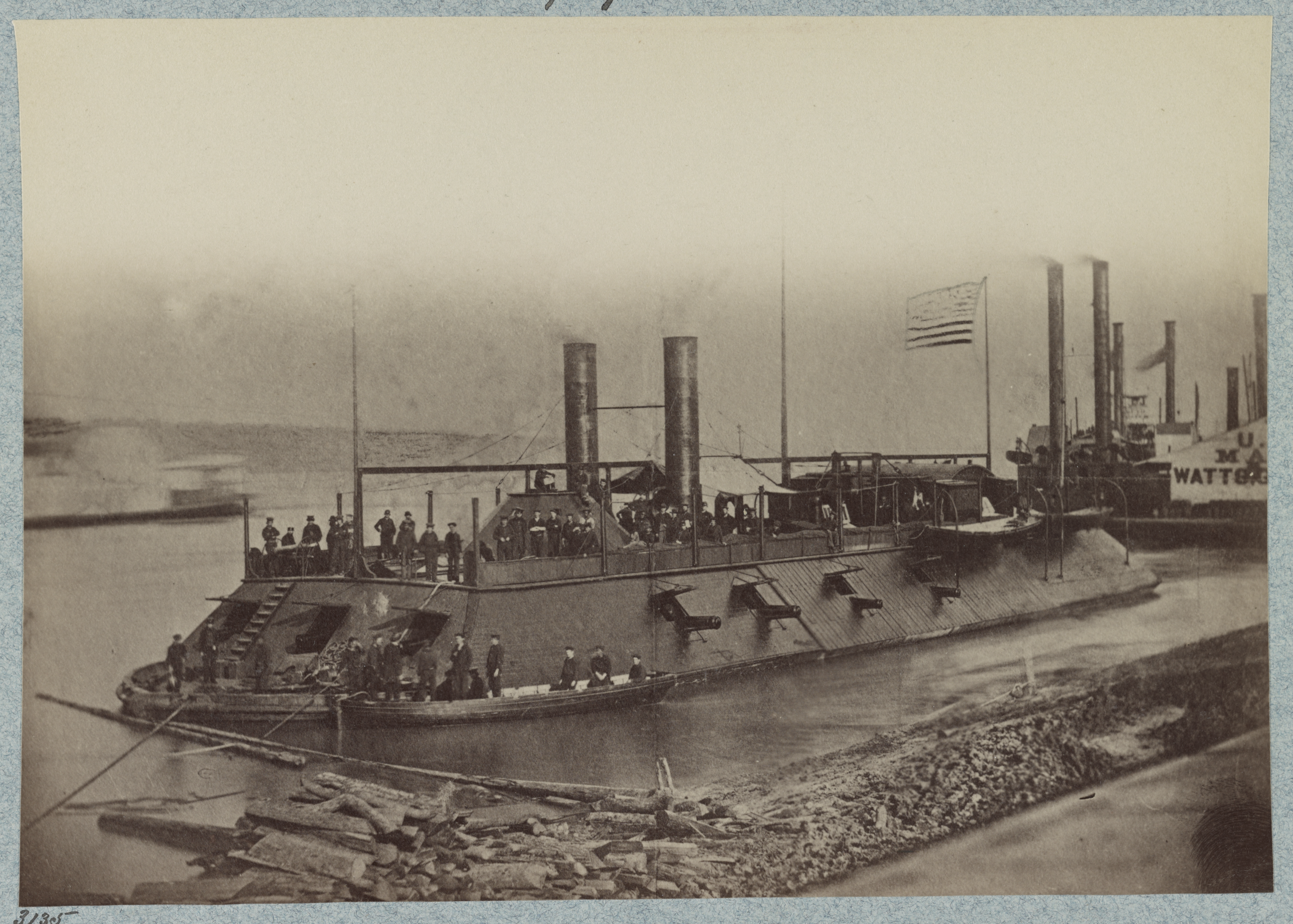
City-class gunboat USS Cairo

St. Louis' Benton Barracks became the mustering depot for western troops, and in February 1862, Department of Missouri commander Henry Halleck approved a joint invasion of west Tennessee along the Tennessee and Cumberland Rivers. Army troops under Brigadier General Ulysses S. Grant, alongside the newly built Western Gunboat Flotilla commanded by Navy Flag Officer Andrew Hull Foote, captured Fort Henry and Fort Donelson, unhinging the Confederate defensive perimeter in the west. After the subsequent Battle of Shiloh, the Federal Army pushed into northern Mississippi, while the Gunboat fleet moved down the Mississippi with cooperating Federal troops, systematically capturing every Confederate position north of Vicksburg, Mississippi.

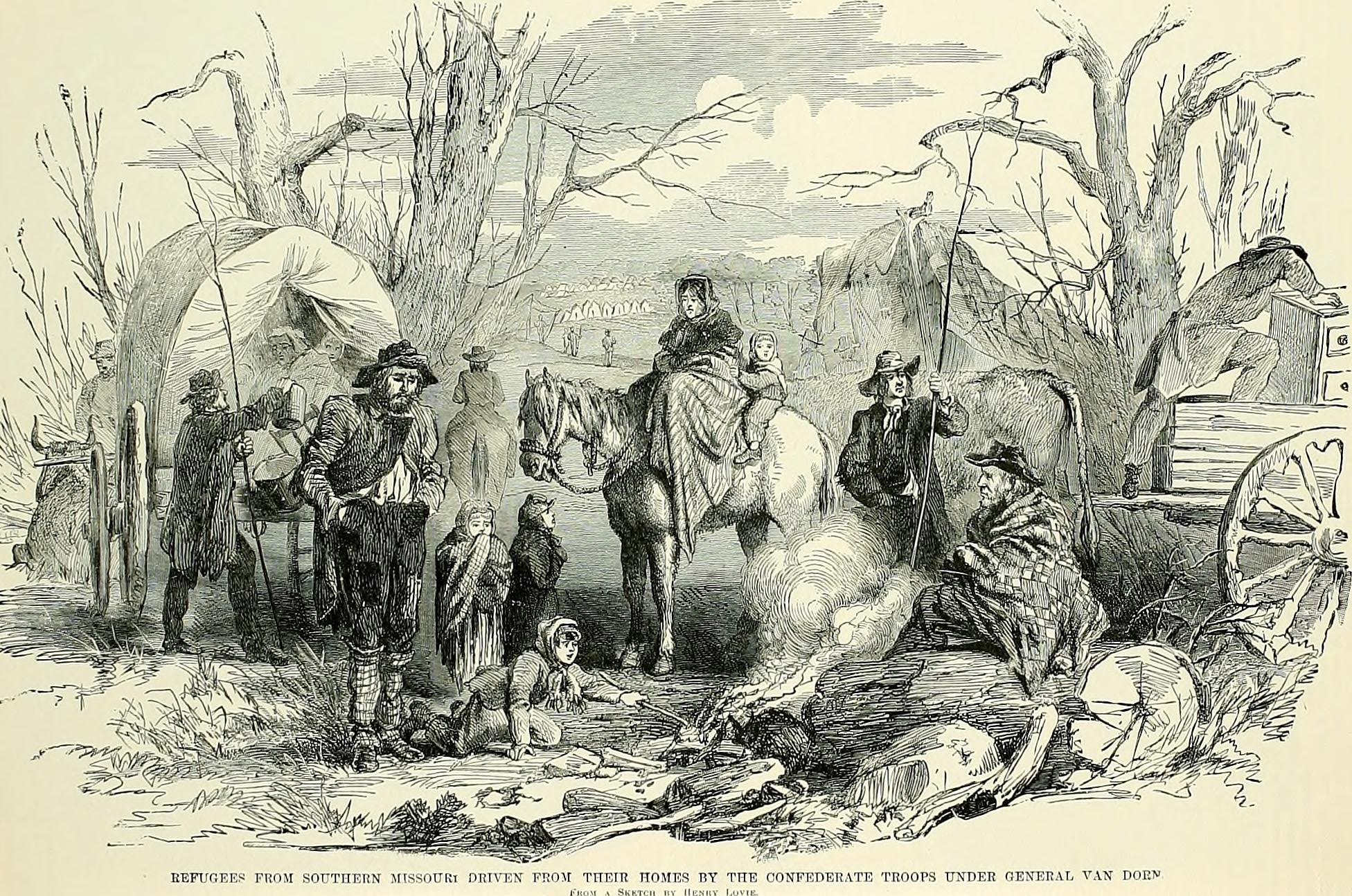
Union refugees, 1862

The riverine strategy put the Confederacy on the defensive in the west for the rest of the war, and effectively ended meaningful Confederate efforts to recapture Missouri. The defeat of the Confederate army under Earl Van Dorn, Benjamin McCulloch, and Price in northwestern Arkansas at the Battle of Pea Ridge further discouraged the Confederate leadership as to the wisdom, or possibility, of occupying Missouri. Subsequent Confederate military action in the state would be limited to a few large raids (notably Shelby's Raid of 1863 and Price's Missouri Expedition of 1864), and partial endorsement of the activities of Missouri guerrillas.

=== Western Sanitary Commission ===
During the war, thousands of black refugees poured into St. Louis, where the Freedmen's Relief Society, the Ladies Union Aid Society, the Western Sanitary Commission, and the American Missionary Association (AMA) set up schools for their children.

The Western Sanitary Commission was a private agency based in St. Louis and a rival of the larger U.S. Sanitary Commission. It operated during the war to help the U.S. Army deal with sick and wounded soldiers. It was led by abolitionists and especially after the war focused more on the needs of freedmen. It was founded in August 1861, under the leadership of Reverend William Greenleaf Eliot, to care for wounded soldiers after the opening battles. It was supported by private fundraising in the city of St. Louis, as well as from donors in California and New England. Parrish explains it selected nurses, provided hospital supplies, set up several hospitals, and outfitted several hospital ships. It also provided clothing and places to stay for freedmen and refugees, and set up schools for black children. It continued to finance various philanthropic projects until 1886.

== Guerrilla warfare, 1862–1864 ==
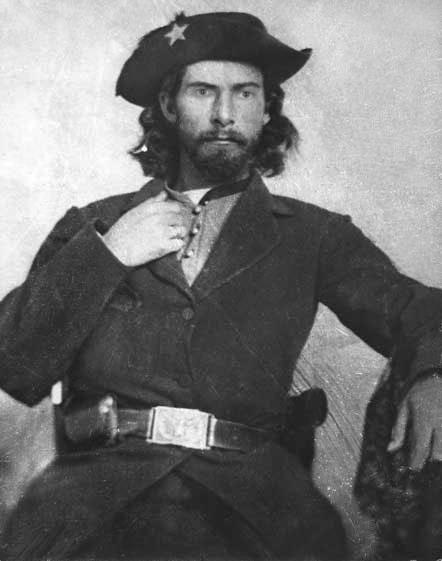
William T. "Bloody Bill" Anderson

The Battle of Wilson's Creek was the last large-scale engagement in Missouri until Sterling Price returned in 1864 in a last-ditch attempt to recapture the state. In the intervening time, the state endured widespread guerrilla warfare in which Southern partisan rangers and bushwhackers battled Kansas-based irregulars known as Jayhawkers and Redlegs or "Redleggers" (from the red gaiters they wore around their lower legs) and their Union allies.

Jayhawker raids against perceived civilian "Confederate sympathizers" alienated Missourians and made maintaining the peace even harder for the Unionist provisional government. As Major General Henry Halleck wrote General John C. Frémont in September 1861, Jayhawker raider Jim Hale had to be removed from the Kansas border as "A few more such raids" would render Missouri "as unanimous against us as is Eastern Virginia". While Jayhawker violence alienated communities that otherwise might have been loyal supporters of the Union, marauding bands of pro-secession bushwhackers sustained guerrilla violence and outright banditry, especially in Missouri's northern counties. Major General John Pope, who oversaw northern Missouri, blamed local citizens for not doing enough to put down bushwhacker guerrillas and ordered locals to raise militias to counter them. "Refusal to do so would bring an occupying force of federal soldiers into their counties." Pope's, Ewing's and Frémont's heavy-handed approach alienated even those civilians who were suffering at the hands of the bushwhackers.

Although guerrilla warfare occurred throughout much of the state, the most notable incidents occurred in northern Missouri and were characterized by ambushes of individuals or families in rural areas. These incidents were particularly nefarious because their vigilante nature was outside the command and control of either side and often pitted neighbor against neighbor. Civilians on all sides faced looting, violence and other depredations.

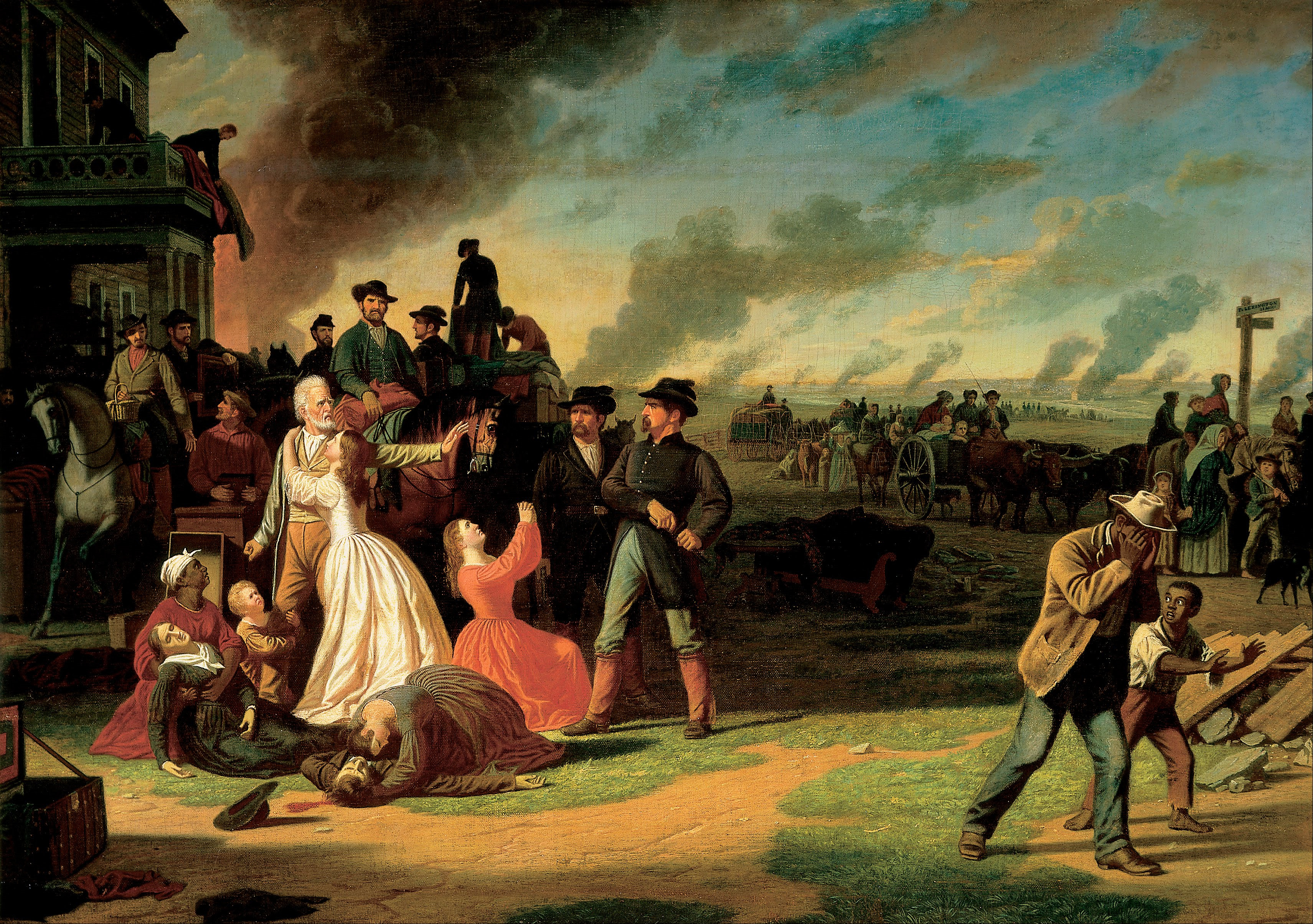
George Caleb Bingham painting of General Order No. 11. In this famous propaganda work General Thomas Ewing is seated on a horse watching the Red Legs.

Perhaps the costliest incidents of guerrilla warfare were the Sacking of Osceola, the burning of Platte City, and the Centralia Massacre. Among the most notorious bushwhackers were William C. Quantrill's raiders, Silas M. Gordon, William "Bloody Bill" Anderson, and a young Jesse James.

=== General Order No. 11 ===
In 1863, following the Lawrence Massacre in Kansas, Union General Thomas Ewing Jr. accused farmers in rural Missouri of either instigating the massacre or supporting it. He issued General Order No. 11 which forced all residents of the rural areas of four counties (Jackson, Cass, Bates and Vernon) south of the Missouri River on the Kansas border to leave their property, which was then burned. The order applied to farmers regardless of loyalty, although those who could prove their loyalty to the Union could stay in designated towns and those who could not were exiled entirely. Among those forced to leave were Kansas City founder John Calvin McCoy and its first mayor, William S. Gregory.

== Later military actions, 1864–1865 ==
=== Price's Missouri Expedition ===
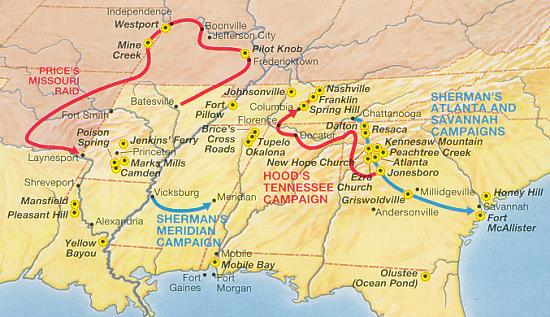
Price's Missouri Raid in the Western Theater of the War, 1864

By 1864, with the Confederacy losing the war, Sterling Price reassembled his Missouri Guard and launched a last-ditch offensive to take Missouri. However, Price was unable to repeat his victorious 1861 campaigns in the state. Striking in the southeastern portion of the state, Price moved north and attempted to capture Fort Davidson but failed. Next, Price sought to attack St. Louis but found it too heavily fortified and thus broke west in a parallel course with the Missouri River. This took him through the relatively friendly country of the "Boonslick", which had provided a large percentage of the Missouri volunteers who had joined the CSA. Ironically, although Price had issued orders against pillage, many of the pro-Confederate civilians in this area (which would be known as "Little Dixie" after the war) suffered from looting and depredations at the hands of Price's men. (Note: After Price's return south, the issue of looting and murder during "independent scouting" would become a major embarrassment during the court martial inquest into the failure of Price's Missouri Expedition. His officers blamed these bad actions on the low quality of some of the men who composed Price's force.)

The Federals attempted to retard Price's advance through both minor and substantial skirmishing such as at Glasgow and Lexington. Price made his way to the extreme western portion of the state, taking part in a series of bitter battles at the Little Blue, Independence, and Byram's Ford. His Missouri campaign culminated in the Battle of Westport, in which over 30,000 troops fought, leading to the defeat of his army. Price's Confederates retreated through Kansas and Indian Territory into Arkansas, where they stayed for the remainder of the war.

== Aftermath ==
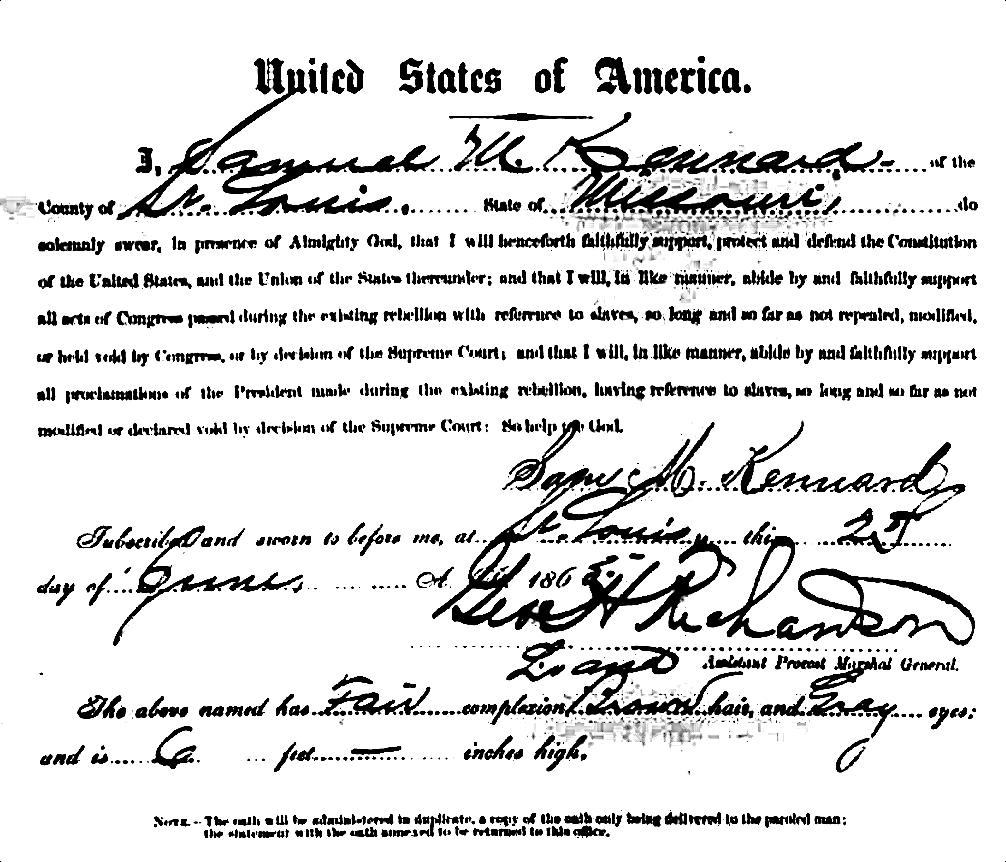
Oath to defend the Constitution of the United States and, among other promises, to "abide by and faithfully support all acts of Congress passed during the ... rebellion having reference to slaves" signed by former Confederate officer Samuel M. Kennard on June 27, 1865

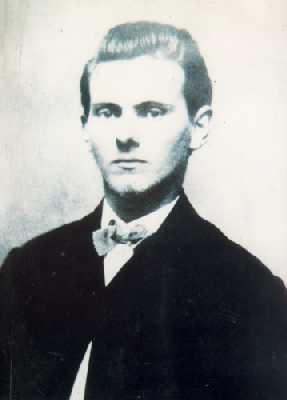
Jesse James

Since Missouri had remained in the Union, it did not see an outside military occupation similar to that seen by other slave states during the Reconstruction era. The immediate post-war state government was controlled by Republicans, who attempted to execute an "internal reconstruction", banning politically powerful former secessionists from the political process and empowering the state's newly emancipated African-American population. This led to major dissatisfaction among many politically important groups, and provided opportunities for reactionary elements in the state.

The Democrats returned to being the dominant power in the state by 1873 through an alliance with returned ex-Confederates, almost all of whom had been part of the pro-slavery anti-Benton wing of the Missouri Democratic Party prior to the Civil War. The reunified Democratic Party exploited themes of racial prejudice and their own version of the South's "Lost Cause", which portrayed Missourians as victims of Federal tyranny and outrages, and depicted Missouri Unionists and Republicans as traitors to the state and criminals. This capture of the historical narrative was largely successful, and secured control of the state for the Democratic Party through the 1950s. The ex-Confederate/Democratic resurgence also defeated efforts to empower Missouri's African-American population, and ushered in the state's version of Jim Crow legislation. This was motivated both by widespread racial prejudice and concerns that former slaves were likely to be reliable Republican voters.

Many newspapers in 1870s Missouri were vehement in their opposition to national Radical Republican policies, for political, economic, and racial reasons. The notorious James-Younger gang capitalized on this and became folk heroes as they robbed banks and trains while getting sympathetic press from the state's newspapers—most notably the Kansas City Times under founder John Newman Edwards. Jesse James, who had fought beside bushwhacker "Bloody Bill" Anderson at Centralia, attempted to excuse his murder of a resident of Gallatin during a bank robbery, saying he thought he was killing Samuel P. Cox, who had hunted down Anderson after Centralia. In addition, the vigilante activities of the Bald Knobbers in southwest Missouri during the 1880s have been interpreted by some as a continuation of Civil War-related guerrilla warfare. (Note: The political orientation of post-war "armed resistance" was different in the rugged south-central part of the state. In this case, notionally pro-Union "Bald Knobbers" were (supposedly) resisting the political resurgence of formerly pro-secessionist "anti-Bald Knobbers". This violence may have had more to do with struggles for local power by group and family alliances than with war-time politics.)

== See also ==
- Confederate States of America § States – animated map of state secession and Confederacy
- List of battles fought in Missouri
- List of Missouri Confederate Civil War units
- List of Missouri Union Civil War units
- Missouri State Guard
- St. Louis in the Civil War

== Notes ==
Preceded by Tennessee	List of C.S. states by date of admission to the Confederacy; Admitted on November 28, 1861 (12th)	Succeeded by Kentucky
