= Theophilus Parsons (professor) =

American law professor (1797–1882)

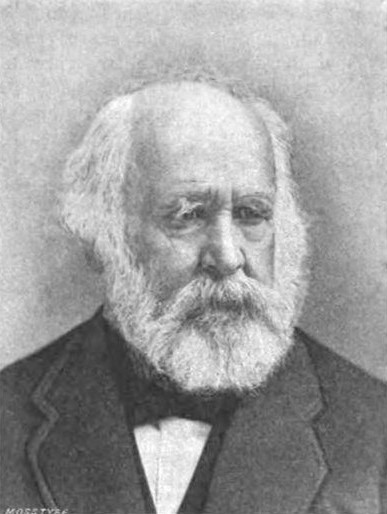
- Born: 1797
- Died: 1882 (aged 84–85)
- Education: Harvard College (1815)
- Children: Emily Elizabeth Parsons
- Father: Theophilus Parsons

Dane Professor of Law at Harvard Law School
- In office 1848–1870
- Succeeded by: Christopher Columbus Langdell

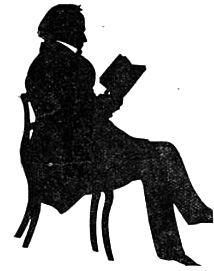
Portrait of Theophilus Parsons, by August Edouart, ca.1842

Theophilus Parsons (1797–1882) was Dane Professor of Law at Harvard from 1848 to 1870.

Parsons is remembered chiefly as the author of a series of useful legal treatises and some books in support of Swedenborgian doctrines. In 1824, he took a position as editor of the new United States Literary Gazette. He wrote a biography of his father, an American jurist who was also named Theophilus Parsons (1749–1813). It was published in Boston in 1859. He also edited and published the Civil War letters of his daughter, Emily Elizabeth Parsons, a nurse and administrator of Benton Barracks military hospital in St. Louis, Missouri.

He graduated from Harvard College in 1815.

== Works ==
- "Distinguished Lawyers," Albany Law Journal Aug. 20, 1870, pp 126-7 online.
- A treatise on the law of partnership (1866) online
- Outlines of the religion and philosophy of Swedenborg (1876) online
- A treatise on maritime law (1859) online
- Address Commemorative of Rufus Choate (1859)
