= Belle Coddington =

Iowan teacher and Civil War nurse (1842–1920)

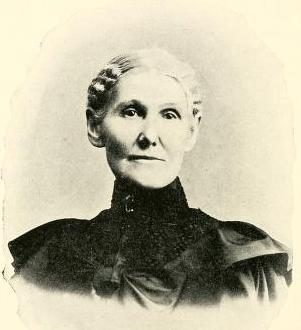
- Belle Coddington, from an 1895 publication.
- Born: Arabella Letitia Graham; December 30, 1842; Champaign County, Ohio
- Died: December 26, 1920 (aged 77); California
- Other names: Arabella Graham, Arabella Graham Tannehill, Arabella G. Coddington
- Known for: nurse during American Civil War

Arabella Letitia Graham Tannehill Coddington (December 30, 1842 – December 26, 1920) was a teacher in Iowa, and a nurse during the American Civil War.

== Wartime service ==
Belle Graham Tannehill was a schoolteacher in Iowa as a young woman. She applied to the Army Nurses' Corps soon after she became a widow at age 20, in 1863. "I do not suppose an officer in the army, from general down to second lieutenant, ever received his commission with greater delight or enthusiasm," she recalled of her acceptance. Early in 1864 she was assigned to Benton Barracks in St. Louis, Missouri, as a ward matron under the supervision of Emily Elizabeth Parsons. She also worked at the Union hospital in Nashville, Tennessee, before returning to St. Louis in 1865, doing work with the United States Christian Commission to assist soldiers mustering out and re-entering civilian life.

Coddington experienced longterm health effects from measles, which she contracted at Benton Barracks. Her pension as a disabled veteran's widow was increased by Congress in 1888, with acknowledgment of her own service: "Prior to her marriage with the soldier she was a hospital nurse, served faithfully as such, and was exposed to and contracted a contagious disease (measles), with which she was seriously and dangerously sick, from which and its results her health was so seriously and permanently impaired that she is a suffering invalid at the present time, and largely disabled from doing any labor for her own support."

== After the war ==
Tannehill's service as an army nurse was mentioned in pro-suffrage literature, as an example of Iowa women's contributions to the nation. After the war and her second marriage, Belle Coddington was active in the National Woman's Relief Corps in Iowa. She wrote a memoir of her time as a war nurse for Mary A. Gardner Holland's Our Army Nurses (1895). She was active in church work for many years in Mount Pleasant, before resigning in 1899. In 1900 and 1901, she spent the school year in Chelan, Washington, with her daughter, who was a teacher.

Coddington's name is included on the bronze plaques in the Henry County courthouse, recording the names of those from the county who served in the American Civil War. In 1925 a chapter of the Daughters of Union Veterans was named for Belle Coddington.

== Personal life ==
Belle Graham married twice. Her first husband was Ninnian H. Tannehill; they married in 1862, and he died from typhoid fever in 1863, at a military hospital in Louisiana. After the war, in 1866, she married Eli Helmick Coddington, a disabled veteran and a Methodist Episcopal minister from Mount Pleasant, Iowa. They raised two children, Clinton and Laura; two other sons died in infancy. She was widowed again when Eli Coddington died in 1877; their only surviving son died in 1894, in Colorado. Belle Graham Coddington died in 1920, while visiting her brother Andrew M. Graham (1847–1928) in California. Her grave is with her husband's and her children's, in Iowa.
