= Barclay and Edwin Coppock =

American rebel

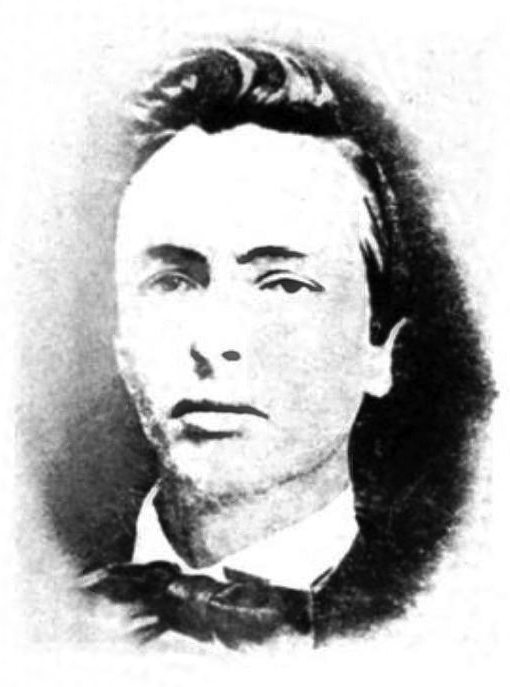
Barclay Coppock

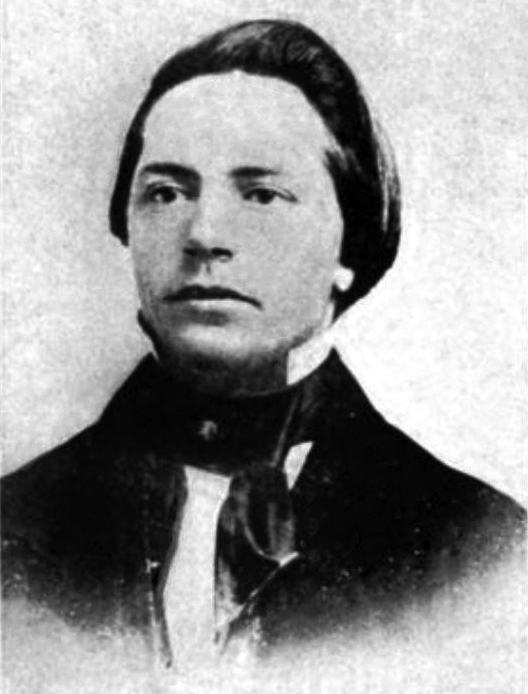
Edwin Coppock

Barclay Coppock (January 4, 1839 – September 4, 1861), also spelled "Coppac", "Coppic", and "Coppoc", was a follower of John Brown. Along with his brother Edwin Coppock (June 30, 1835 – December 16, 1859), he participated in Brown's raid on Harpers Ferry.

Edwin and Barclay Coppock were born of Quaker parentage in Winona, Ohio, near the intensely abolitionist town of Salem. After their father died early in their lives, they were raised by John Butler, described as "a benevolent Quaker", who has left us his recollections of Edwin. In 1857 Edwin was expelled from the church, as he refused to give up dancing. As teenagers they moved to Springdale, Iowa, where their mother was living. It was here that they met John Brown as he passed through in early 1859, transporting people who had been enslaved in Missouri to freedom. That summer, the two boys bade their mother goodbye, despite her fears of the violence they would encounter, and traveled to Chambersburg, Pennsylvania, to meet Brown's growing army.

== Edwin Coppock captured, tried, and hanged ==
For his participation in John Brown's raid on Harpers Ferry, Edwin was tried and convicted of treason, murder, and fomenting a slave insurrection, and was hanged in Charles Town, Virginia (since 1863, West Virginia), on December 16, 1859. He wrote to his uncle, Joshua Coppock, two days before his execution. The uncle went to Charles Town and brought Edwin's body to Salem; the "rude coffin" in which it was transported is held by the Ohio History Connection at its Museum in Columbus.

The body was laid out three nights, with armed guard; the guard was to prevent anti-abolitionists from stealing the body to prevent the funeral. Attendance was described as "immense"; hundreds came for the funeral and to hear the "eulogistic speeches". The body was moved to City Hall. His remains were first buried in the Friends Burying Ground, New Garden, Ohio. Attendance at the burial was estimated to have been from two to three thousand.

By 1888 he had been reburied in Hope Cemetery, about 10 miles (16 km) away in Salem, his grave marked by a plain brownstone monument some 12 feet (3.7 m) in height, marked only with his name and his birth and death dates.

This monument was erected through the liberality of an eccentric old Scotchman named [Daniel] Howell Hise, who was at that time living near Salem, and to his honor be it said, was a prominent "Conductor" on the "Underground Railway," helping many a runaway slave on his way through Ohio to Canada and liberty. It is a fact worthy of note that on each recurring Decoration Day Coppic's [sic] grave is marked, through the courtesy of the Grand Army post of Salem, with the little flag entltling it to be decorated with wreaths and bouquets of flowers by the comrades and little girls detailed for that purpose, just the same as the graves of tha Union soldiers whose remains to the number of 200 are burled in the beautiful old village cemetery.

== Barclay Coppock, in the Union Army ==
Barclay, like Owen Brown and Francis Jackson Meriam, did not enter Harpers Ferry; they remained at the Kennedy Farm guarding the weapons. When it became clear that the raid was failing, they escaped northward, after much difficulty reaching John Brown, Jr.'s house in Ashtabula County, Ohio. Barclay continued to Canada, later returning to Springdale, Iowa, where his mother lived. On January 23, 1860, about three months after the Harpers Ferry raid, Iowa governor Samuel Kirkwood received from the governor of Virginia a requisition "for one Barclay Coppock, reputed to be a fugitive from the justice of Virginia". Kirkwood found the requisition deficient in legal form and returned it to Virginia. Barclay was gone to Canada by the time Kirkwood received the corrected papers.

He later returned to Ashtabula County, Ohio, where John Brown Junior lived, and where raiders Owen Brown and Francis Merriam were taking refuge. A newspaper story reports that they were all registered to vote there. Barclay, along with Owen, addressed a meeting the day of Hazlett's and Stevens' executions.

Barclay later joined the Union Army during the American Civil War and served as a recruiting officer. He was killed in action when Confederate sabotage derailed his train over the Platte River, an incident called the Platte Bridge Railroad Tragedy.

== See also ==
- John Brown's raiders

== Further reading (most recent first) ==
- Lord, Jeannette Mather (April 1959). "John Brown: They Had a Concern". West Virginia History. 20 (3): 163–183. Archived from the original on May 28, 2022.
- Teakle, Thomas (January 1928). "Rendition Foiled". The Palimpsest. 9 (11): 427–433. doi:10.17077/0031-0360.21907. S2CID 265391427.
- Galbreath, C. B. (October 1921). "Edwin Coppoc". Ohio History Journal. 30 (4): 396–451. Archived from the original on March 11, 2022.
- Mendenhall, Thomas C. (October 1921). "The Coffin of Edwin Coppock". Ohio History Journal. 30 (4): 452–456. Archived from the original on July 20, 2021.
- Galbreath, C. B. (October 1921). "Barclay Coppoc". Ohio History Journal. 30 (4): 459–481. Archived from the original on May 31, 2022.
- Teakle, Thomas (October 1912). "The Rendition of Barclay Coppoc". The Iowa Journal of History and Politics. 10 (4): 502–566. Archived from the original on May 31, 2022.
- Coppock, Edwin (December 31, 1859) [December 13, 1859]. "Letter from Edwin Coppock to his Uncle Joshua Coppock". Anti-Slavery Bugle. Lisbon, Ohio. p. 2. Archived from the original on February 17, 2022 – via newspapers.com.
- Coppoc, Edwin (December 22, 1859) [November 22, 1859]. "Letter to friends". Letters from Virginia. p. 1. Archived from the original on June 3, 2021 – via newspapers.com.
