= Lucy Kaiser =

American Civil War nurse

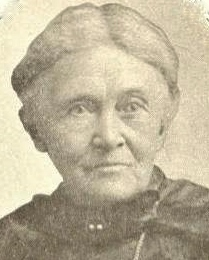

Lucy Kaiser was a volunteer Union nurse during the American Civil War. Kaiser's service began in April 1861 as she left for St. Louis, Missouri. She soon after witnessed the battle of Carthage and felt inspired to get involved in the war effort. Kaiser soon found a service opportunity at the United States Post Hospital where she left her name to be called upon if needed. In the meantime, she remained in St. Louis to help the soldiers as she could. For example, Kaiser often wrote letters to prominent community members asking for supplies. During this time, Kaiser stayed at a hotel in St. Louis and served out of her own good will and expense.

On August 29, 1861, Kaiser traveled to Rolla, Missouri for service. Upon her arrival, Kaiser immediately noticed rampant disease: measles, fevers, colds, and even homesickness. Much like in St. Louis, supplies were incredibly scarce. In September of the same year, Kaiser committed to service in the Jefferson Barracks Hospital where she saw a great need for assistance. Once again, she took it upon herself to garner supplies for the severely under-stocked hospital. Kaiser also took up the cleaning of the ward. Though there weren't many injured or ill patients, Kaiser did not a fear that men from the regiments had been taken as prisoners of war. As new patients arrived, however, Kaiser took on work that typically was completed by the doctor in addition to her nursing duties. Despite her best efforts, on November 1, a soldier reported Kaiser, alleging that she did not give him enough food despite the scarcity of food and rations. Kaiser persisted in her efforts. A new doctor and steward arrived during her service, but they weren't attentive to the needs of their patients. Kaiser, once again, took on the extra work without complaint.

Even with all of her work, the hospital was severely neglected, which was frustrating for Kaiser. In February 1862, Kaiser transferred to the Benton Barracks. Her work load did not decrease, however; Kaiser acted as a supervisor and a nurse, as well as overseeing kitchen and laundry operations.

When the opportunity presented itself, Kaiser followed the regiment to Pittsburg Landing, Tennessee to battle. Despite numerous objections, Kaiser boarded a hospital ship heading to the battleground. Once the battle at Shiloh completed, Kaiser remained at the battlefield to help evacuate and treat the wounded soldiers. Kaiser soon repeated this experience at the Battle of Vicksburg: she left for battle on May 17, 1863. During her service at Vicksburg, Kaiser met both General Grant and General Sherman. Once again, Kaiser helped evacuate wounded soldiers via hospital ship.

Kaiser resigned from the service in June 1864 after over three years of service. The saddest part of her entire experience, according to Kaiser, was not only seeing the horror of war first hand, but especially writing letters to the wives and mothers of deceased servicemen.
