= Burning of Platte City =

The first Burning of Platte City, Missouri occurred during the American Civil War on December 16, 1861, after Union troops attempted to capture the bushwhacker Silas M. Gordon.

Gordon, who lived in Platte County, Missouri, had been conducting numerous raids and was suspected of masterminding the September 3, 1861, Platte Bridge Railroad Tragedy in which a Hannibal & St. Joseph Railroad train was derailed on a sabotaged bridge across the Platte River (Iowa and Missouri) by St. Joseph, Missouri, killing 17 to 20 and injuring 100.

Union troops went to capture Gordon in November 1861 but were stopped in a brief skirmish at Bee Creek, in which two Federals were killed and Gordon and his men left after running out of ammunition.

Gordon with 30 to 40 men captured Weston, Missouri, in early December and carried off two Federal soldiers as captives. They camped on the lawn of the Platte County Courthouse in Platte City and Gordon was said to swagger around the square with a large sword at his side.

Gordon stole county records from the courthouse and threatened to kill the district judge if he came to Platte City. Union General David Hunter issued an order from neighboring Fort Leavenworth, Kansas, for Platte County to either deliver Gordon or have the city burned. In early December, Colonel W. James Morgan of the 18th Missouri Infantry USA marched from St. Joseph to Platte City and set fire to the city and courthouse and captured three Confederate soldiers either home on furlough or returned home following the expiration of the terms of their enlistment.

On December 17 Morgan ignored the pleas for leniency from the father of one of the prisoners named Black Triplett. Instead, Morgan took Triplett and prisoner Gabriel Close to the Bee Creek site where the Federals had been killed. Triplett was executed outright and Close was bayonetted as he fled. The letters "U.S." were scrawled in Triplett's blood on the Bee Creek bridge. (See Bee Creek Massacre.)

Gordon was to engage in further guerrilla activities elsewhere in Missouri and Texas. In 1864 he returned to Platte City and Union troops once again burned the city.
