= Madison Miller =

American soldier (1811–1896)

- Born: February 6, 1811; Mercer, Pennsylvania, U.S.
- Died: February 27, 1896 (aged 85); St. Louis, Missouri, U.S.
- Burial place: Bellefontaine Cemetery
- Military career
- Allegiance: United States; Union
- Branch: United States Army; Union Army
- Rank: Colonel; Bvt. Brigadier General; Brigadier General (Militia)
- Unit: 2nd Regiment of Illinois Volunteers
- Commands: 18th Missouri Volunteer Infantry
- Conflicts: Mexican–American War: Battle of Buena Vista; American Civil War: Battle of Wilson's Creek; Battle of Shiloh
- Other work: real estate agent

Madison Miller (1811–1896) was an American soldier, military officer and railroad manager.

== Biography ==
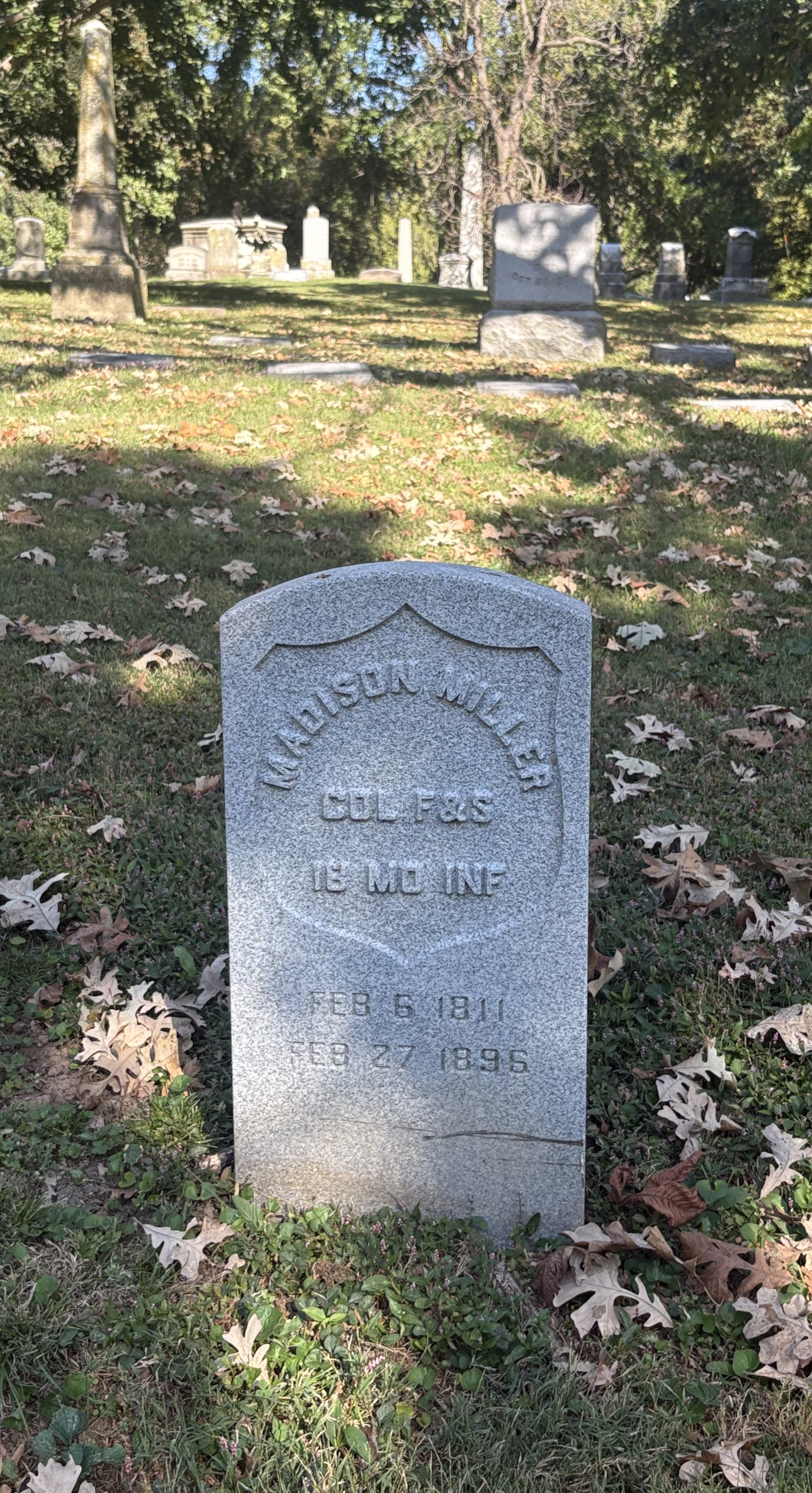
Miller's grave at Bellefontaine Cemetery

In the Mexican–American War, Miller held a captaincy within the 2nd Illinois Regiment of Volunteers and was wounded at the Battle of Buena Vista.

By the Civil War, Miller had already held posts as the mayor Carondelet, Missouri, president of the St. Louis and Iron Mountain Railroad, and Missouri State Legislator. Mayor Miller was a passenger on the Pacific Railroad excursion train that crashed through the temporary bridge over the Gasconade River on November 1, 1855. He was badly injured in the accident. He then organized the 1st Missouri Light Artillery and was made commanding captain of the unit. Miller soon distinguished himself in the Union defeat at the Battle of Wilson's Creek.

In February 1862, Miller was given the command of the 18th Missouri Volunteer Infantry following the removal of W. James Morgan as colonel. In the Battle of Shiloh, Miller commanded the 2nd Brigade in Benjamin Prentiss' division and took part in the fighting in the Hornet's Nest. Despite his courage in battle, he was taken prisoner when the men of the Hornet's Nest defense were captured. He was exchanged and returned to briefly command a brigade in the XVI Corps during the winter of 1863–1864. He resigned in March 1864 but was appointed Brigadier General in the Missouri State Militia in September 1864. He commanded a militia brigade during Price's Raid. On March 13, 1865, he was given a brevet promotion to brigadier general of U.S. volunteers for his service at Shiloh.

Following the war, he managed portions of the Pacific Railroad, dabbled in St. Louis, Missouri area real estate and held the position of vice-president within the Society of the Army of the Tennessee in 1893.

He died at his home in St. Louis on February 27, 1896, and was buried at Bellefontaine Cemetery.
