= St. Louis in the American Civil War =

The city of St. Louis was a strategic location during the American Civil War, holding significant value for both Union and Confederate forces. As the largest city in the fiercely divided border state of Missouri and the most important economic hub on the upper Mississippi River, St. Louis was a major launching point and supply depot for campaigns in the Western and Trans-Mississippi Theaters.

== Background ==
Located at the junction of the Missouri, Illinois and Mississippi Rivers, St. Louis was a major port and commercial center with a rapidly growing industrial base. The population reached 160,000 in 1860 and consisted mostly of recent immigrants, especially Catholic German Americans and Irish Americans. Early Union volunteer regiments in St. Louis were composed largely of the dominant German immigrants.

The only major city west of the Mississippi River in the geographic center of the country, St. Louis had also emerged as the gateway to the new American frontier. It had long served as the starting point for voyages of exploration and emigration into the unsettled West and as the westernmost terminus of many early efforts to construct transcontinental lines of transportation and communication.

== Camp Jackson Affair ==
In March 1861, Captain Nathaniel Lyon arrived in St. Louis in command of Company B of the U.S. 2nd Infantry Regiment. At the time, the state of Missouri was relatively neutral in the dispute between North and South, but newly elected Missouri Governor Claiborne Fox Jackson was a strong Southern sympathizer. Lyon was concerned that Jackson meant to seize the federal arsenal in St. Louis if the state seceded and that the Union had insufficient defensive forces to prevent its capture. He attempted to strengthen the defenses, but came into opposition with his superiors, including Brigadier General William S. Harney of the Department of the West. Lyon employed his friendship with Francis P. Blair Jr. to have himself named commander of the arsenal. When the Civil War broke out and President Abraham Lincoln called for troops to put down the Confederacy, Missouri was asked to supply four regiments. Governor Jackson refused the request and ordered the Missouri militia to muster outside St. Louis under the stated purpose of training for home defense.

Lyon allegedly disguised himself as a farm woman to spy on the militia camp and confirmed the presence of artillery stolen from a federal arsenal. Lyon himself had been extensively involved in the St. Louis Wide Awakes, a pro-Union paramilitary organization that he intended to arm with the arsenal's supplies and muster into the ranks of the federal army. Upon obtaining command of the arsenal, Lyon armed the Wide Awake units under guise of night. Lyon had most of the weapons in the arsenal secretly moved across the river to Illinois, and on May 10, he led the 2nd Infantry to the camp, forcing its surrender. Riots broke out in St. Louis after Lyon marched his prisoners through the city. The event provoked the Camp Jackson Affair of May 10, 1861, in which Lyons' troops opened fire on a crowd of civilians, killing 28 and injuring at least 90. The Camp Jackson Affair polarized the population of Missouri, leading many once-neutral citizens to advocate secession and setting the stage for sustained violence between the opposing factions.

== St. Louis Riot ==
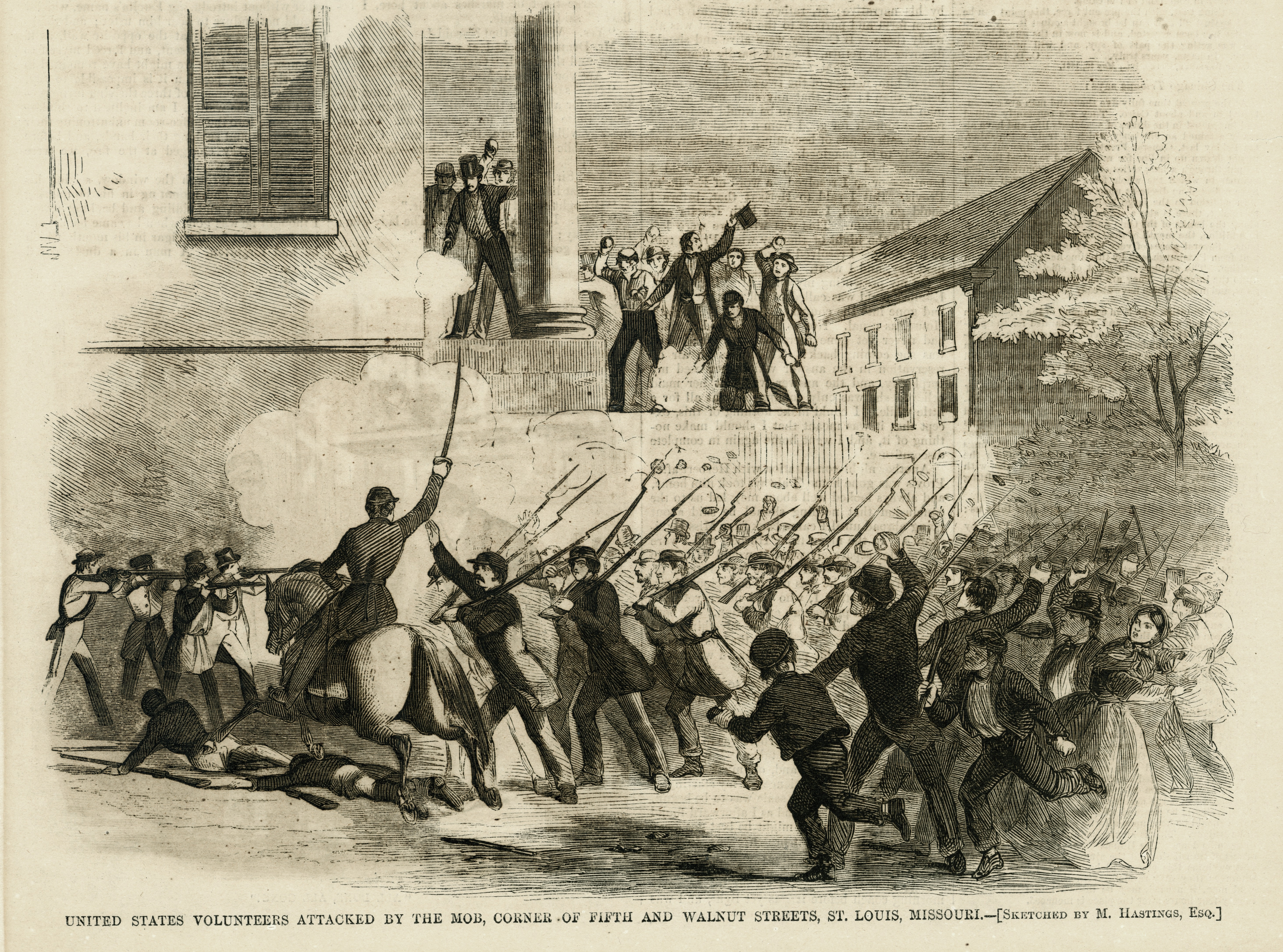
The St. Louis Riot

The division of loyalties between Union and Confederacy resulted in further loss of life on May 11, 1861. Union soldiers of the Fifth Regiment, United States Reserve Corps, Missouri Volunteers were attacked by Confederate sympathizers within hours of being mustered into service. The regiment was marching from the federal arsenal when it was attacked on the corner of Walnut and Broadway. Shots were exchanged, and six persons were killed. The Fifth Regiment consisted primarily of loyal Germans, having been recruited from the city's Tenth Ward.

== Civil War ==
During the Civil War, St. Louis stayed under Union control because of the strong military base and public support from loyal Germans. The largest percentage of volunteers served in the Union army, though many also went south to fight for the Confederacy. Some people who stayed in the city during the war and supported the South smuggled supplies, medicine, and otherwise assisted Confederate soldiers.

No major battles were fought in or near the city, but the Mississippi River was a vital highway during the war. Divided loyalties to the Union and Confederacy caused rifts in some families in St. Louis. This divide remained consistent throughout the entirety of the war. Though many believed in the cause of abolition, others were concerned about the economic response and potential destruction of critical infrastructure in the blossoming city.

Benton Barracks was a Union Army military encampment established during the war at the present site of the St. Louis Fairground Park. After the Battle of Lexington, the Post and Convalescent Hospitals were added to the training barracks, in order to assist in treating hundreds of incoming wounded troops. Eventually, the Benton Barracks Hospital, under the direction of Emily Elizabeth Parsons, became the largest Civil War hospital in the American West, housing 2,000 black and white Union soldiers.

== Refugees ==
In the early years of the war, large amounts of child refugees came into St. Louis and continued to for the next few years. It is believed that about half of the refugees that entered St. Louis were adolescents, and a majority of the rest claimed to be loyal to the Union or were escaped slaves.

Thousands of black refugees poured into St. Louis, where the Freedmen's Relief Society, the Ladies Union Aid Society, the Western Sanitary Commission, and the American Missionary Association (AMA) set up schools for the children. They were also assisted by political organizations of St. Louis' free black community, such as the Equal Rights League. Returning black Union soldiers like James Milton Turner and Moses Dickson were instrumental in setting up Lincoln University after the Civil War.
