= Bee Creek Massacre =

Coordinates: 39.382°N 94.867°W

The Bee Creek Massacre occurred in December 1861, when Union Army troops of the 18th Missouri Infantry Regiment summarily executed two Confederate prisoners of war.

Southern bushwhacker Silas M. Gordon had been operating out of Platte County, Missouri for several months before regional Federal military authorities attempted to capture him and his followers. In November 1861, two Federal soldiers were killed near the Bee Creek Bridge, a few miles north of Weston, Missouri.

By mid-December, elements of the 18th Missouri Infantry had seized neighboring Platte City and captured three Confederate soldiers: Black Triplett, Gabriel Close, and William Kuykendall. The captives were either on furlough or had returned home after their enlistment ended. In his history of Platte County, W. M. Paxton, a resident, related that he spoke to the 18th Missouri's colonel, W. James Morgan, asking on behalf of Triplett's father that he be allowed to speak with his son. Morgan's reply was, "Yes, God damn him! Let him say now what he pleases, for he will never see him alive again."

Morgan took Triplett and Close near Bee Creek Bridge. Triplett stood and was shot. Close, with his arms bound, fled to the nearby creek bed, where he quickly became mired in the mud. A Federal soldier descended upon him and bayoneted him to death. The letters "U.S." were scrawled in Triplett's blood on the bridge. The third prisoner, William Kuykendall, was spared.

== Sources ==
- Anders, Leslie, The Eighteenth Missouri, 1968
- Paxton, W.M., Annals of Platte County, Missouri, 1897
