= Gordonville, Texas =

Unincorporated community in Texas, US

- Unincorporated community
- Location within Texas
- Coordinates: 33°47′44″N 96°51′10″W
- Country: United States
- State: Texas
- County: Grayson
- Named for: Silas M. Gordon

Area
  - Unincorporated community: 27.77 sq mi (71.9 km^{2})
  - Land: 22.63 sq mi (58.6 km^{2})
  - Water: 5.14 sq mi (13.3 km^{2})
  - Metro: 979 sq mi (2,536 km^{2})

Population (2010)
  - Unincorporated community: 1,714
  - Density: 76/sq mi (29/km^{2})
  - Metro: 120,877
  - Metro density: 130/sq mi (50/km^{2})
- Time zone: UTC-6 (Central (CST))
  - Summer (DST): UTC-5 (CDT)
- ZIP codes: 76245
- Area codes: 903, 430

Gordonville is an unincorporated community in northwestern Grayson County, Texas, United States.

== History ==
Gordonville is situated on Farm to Market Road 901, and sits on the shore of Lake Texoma. It was part of a sheep ranch until 1872. William Quantrill and his army often visited Gordonville during the American Civil War, and Quantrill named the town after his treasurer, Silas M. Gordon.
