= Theophilus Parsons =

American judge

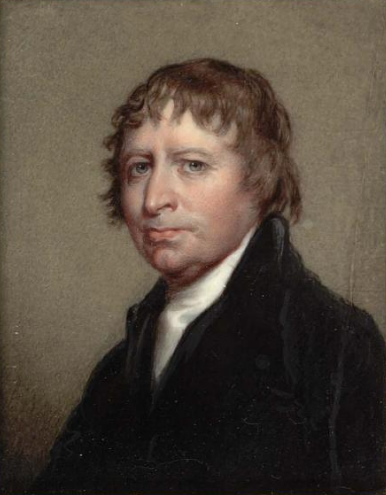
- portrait by Sarah Goodridge

Personal details
- Born: February 24, 1750 Newbury, Massachusetts Bay, British America
- Died: October 30, 1813 (aged 63) Boston, Massachusetts, U.S.
- Party: Federalist
- Spouse: Elizabeth Greenleaf
- Children: Theophilus Parsons
- Education: Harvard College
- Relatives: Emily Elizabeth Parsons (granddaughter)

Theophilus Parsons (February 24, 1750 – October 30, 1813) was an American jurist based in Massachusetts.

== Biography ==
Born in Newbury, Massachusetts, to a clergyman father, Parsons was one of the early students at the Dummer Academy (now The Governor's Academy) before matriculating to Harvard College. He graduated in 1769, was a schoolmaster in Falmouth (now Portland, Maine) from 1770 to 1773; he studied law, and was admitted to the bar in 1774. From 1787 to 1789, he tutored John Quincy Adams in law. In 1800, he moved to Boston.

Parsons served as chief justice of the Supreme Judicial Court of Massachusetts from 1806 until his death in Boston in 1813. In politics, he was active as one of the Federalist leaders in the state. He was a member of the Essex County convention of 1778—called to protest against the proposed state constitution—and as a member of the "Essex Junto" was probably the author of The Essex Result, which helped to secure the constitution's rejection at the polls. He was elected a Fellow of the American Academy of Arts and Sciences in 1781. He was also elected a member of the American Antiquarian Society in 1813.

Parsons was a member of the state constitutional convention of 1779–1780 and one of the committee of 26 who drafted the constitution. He was also a delegate to the state convention of 1788 which ratified the Federal Constitution. In 1792, he was a candidate for the U.S. House of Representatives. According to tradition, he was the author of the famous Conciliatory Resolutions, or proposed amendments to the constitution, which did much to win over Samuel Adams and John Hancock to ratification. His Commentaries on the Laws of the United States (1836) contains some of his more important legal opinions.

Parsons died in Boston in 1813. His son, also named Theophilus Parsons (1797–1882), was an author and a professor at Harvard.

Legal offices
Preceded by Francis Dana	Chief Justice of the Massachusetts Supreme Judicial Court; 1806–1813	Succeeded by Samuel Sewall
