= W. James Morgan =

W. James Morgan (died 1866) was a Union Army recruiter and officer in the American Civil War.

Born in New York, Morgan had experience as a member of militia units in both Ohio and Indiana. At the outbreak of the Civil War, Morgan was living as a grocer in Brunswick, Missouri and began to recruit men for a mounted infantry unit in Federal service to be known as the Morgan Rangers. Morgan was made full colonel and authorized to raise a full regiment of infantry, which was recruited predominantly in northern Missouri. The Morgan Rangers eventually molded into the 18th Missouri Volunteer Infantry which completed formation in December, 1861.

Morgan's decisions often appeared as inflammatory considering his early role as commander of occupation forces in Platte County, Missouri. At one point in late 1861, Morgan even wrote to Henry Halleck advocating that Morgan order two Confederate sympathizers shot to make an example for the rest of the local population. In December 1861, Morgan ordered two Confederate soldiers home either on furlough or on expiration of their terms of enlistment executed at Bee Creek Bridge and subsequently was responsible for the Burning of Platte City, Missouri.

By February 1862, Morgan was officially derided by higher command for the bombastic actions he had perpetrated while in command of the 18th Missouri in Platte County. Morgan was officially relieved of command of the regiment, which was then entrusted to veteran artillery captain Madison Miller.

Morgan died in Natchez, Mississippi in 1866.
