= Platte Bridge Railroad Tragedy =

Civil war attack in Missouri, U.S.

Coordinates: 39.7253°N 94.7059°W

The Platte Bridge Railroad Tragedy was a bushwhacker attack on the Hannibal and St. Joseph Railroad during the American Civil War on September 3, 1861, in which the train derailed on a bridge over the Platte River east of St. Joseph, Missouri, killing between 17 and 20 and injuring 100. The bridge crosses the river in Buchanan County, between Marion Township on the east, and Washington Township on the west.

Confederate partisans planned to burn the lower timbers of the 160-foot (49 m) bridge across the river, leaving the top looking intact. At 11:15 p.m. on a moonless night, the westbound passenger train from Hannibal, Missouri, to St. Joseph started to cross the bridge. The supports cracked and gave way. The locomotive flipped, falling 30 feet (9.1 m) into the shallow river and bringing with it the freight cars, baggage car, mail car and two passenger cars with 100 men, women and children. Bodies and the injured were taken to the Patee House near the St. Joseph depot. Union soldiers were ordered to track down and execute bushwhackers for their part in the incident.

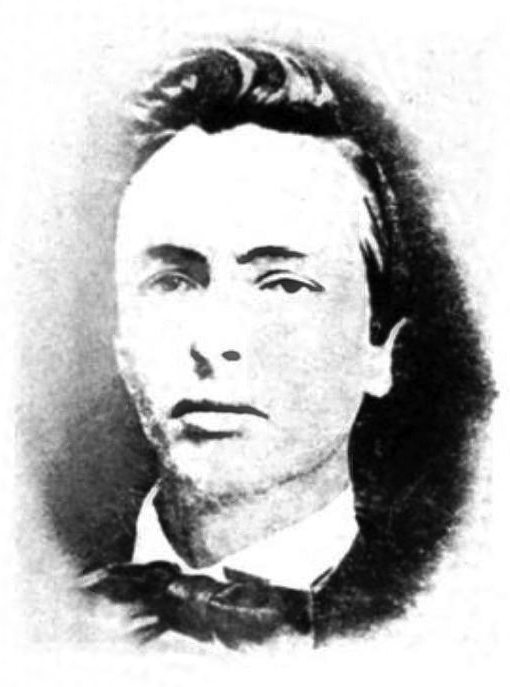
Barclay Coppock

Confederate Major General Sterling Price, who had been invading northern Missouri at the time, wrote Union commanding general Henry Wager Halleck to protest, stating the sabotage was "lawful and proper" according to the rules of warfare and that the captured men should be treated as prisoners of war. Halleck replied that the bushwhackers were "spies, marauders, robbers, incendiaries, guerrilla bands...in the garb of peaceful citizens". The bushwhackers were also to say that the train was a military target because there were soldiers on it bound for Fort Leavenworth, Kansas. One of the soldiers killed was Barclay Coppock, a member of John Brown's raid on Harper's Ferry. The bushwackers were also to claim that it was an attempt to assassinate former Missouri Governor Robert Marcellus Stewart.

The most prominent of the bushwhackers sought by the Federal troops was Silas M. Gordon. Union troops were to burn Platte City, Missouri twice (in December 1861 and July 1864) in unsuccessful attempts to force the townspeople to surrender him (see the Burning of Platte City).

The railroad at the time was the first to cross the state of Missouri and it was used to deliver mail to and from the Pony Express terminus in St. Joseph, Missouri. Col. Ulysses S. Grant's first commission in the Civil War had been guarding the trains. In August he was promoted to brigadier general on a new assignment.
