= Iowa Heritage Illustrated =

- Discipline: Iowa history
- Language: English

Publication details
- Former name: The Palimpsest (1920–96)
- History: 1920–2014
- Publisher: State Historical Society of Iowa (United States)
- Frequency: Quarterly (1987-2014); Bimonthly (1973–86); Monthly (1920–73)

Standard abbreviations
- ISO 4: Iowa Herit. Illus.

Indexing
- as The Palimpsest
- ISSN: 0031-0360
- as Iowa Heritage Illustrated
- ISSN: 1088-5943

Links
- Journal archive

Iowa Heritage Illustrated was the historical magazine of the State Historical Society of Iowa, published in Iowa City. It contained stories about Iowa history written for a lay audience, along photographs, reproductions of historic documents, and other media. Iowa Heritage Illustrated was first published in 1920 as The Palimpsest and renamed in 1996. It was originally published monthly, was bimonthly from 1973 to 1986, and then was a quarterly publication from 1987 onward. Its last issue was published in 2014.
