= Silas M. Gordon =

Silas M. Gordon (1835–1888) was an anti-United States Federal government guerrilla who indirectly caused Platte City, Missouri, to be burned twice by forces during the American Civil War. The town of Gordonville, Texas, is named for him. Confederate Silas "Si" Gordon was born in Montgomery County, Kentucky in 1835 and moved with his parents, William and Lucretia (Muir) Gordon, to Platte County, Missouri.

At the outbreak of the Civil War, Gordon engaged in various guerrilla actions, including kidnapping Union officers in Missouri. He was accused of masterminding the September 3 Platte Bridge Railroad Tragedy in which a Hannibal & St. Joseph Railroad train derailed on a sabotaged Platte River bridge at St. Joseph, Missouri.

Gordon and 30 to 40 of his followers set up camp in November 1861 by the Platte County Courthouse in Platte City. He was to engage Federal troops in November at Bee Creek, in which two Federals were killed. In December his band briefly captured Weston, Missouri.

Gordon stole county records from the courthouse and threatened to kill the district judge if he came to Platte City. Union General David Hunter issued an order from neighboring Fort Leavenworth, Kansas, to the Platte County trustees to either deliver Gordon within 10 days or have the city burned and the slaves in the county freed. In early December Col. James Morgan marched from St. Joseph to Platte City and set fire to the city and courthouse and captured three of Gordon's men on December 16 during the Burning of Platte City.

On December 17 Morgan ignored the pleas for leniency from the father of one of the prisoners, a man named Black Triplett. Instead, Morgan took Triplett and prisoner Gabriel Close to the Bee Creek site where the Federals had been killed. Triplett was executed outright and Close was bayonetted as he fled. The letters "U.S." were scrawled in Triplett's blood on the Bee Creek bridge.

Gordon joined the Missouri State Guard under Sterling Price and was in the Battle of Pea Ridge, Battle of Iuka, Second Battle of Corinth, and Battle of Vicksburg. He was reported to have joined guerrilla fighter William Quantrill and Quantrill's Raiders in Texas. He returned to guerrilla activities in Missouri in 1864 around Platte County. In July 1864, Union troops once again burned the city in an attempt to capture him (the courthouse was not to be rebuilt from the first fire until 1867).

Gordon returned to Texas and resided in Gordonville until his death in 1888.
