= Emily Elizabeth Parsons =

American hospital administrator

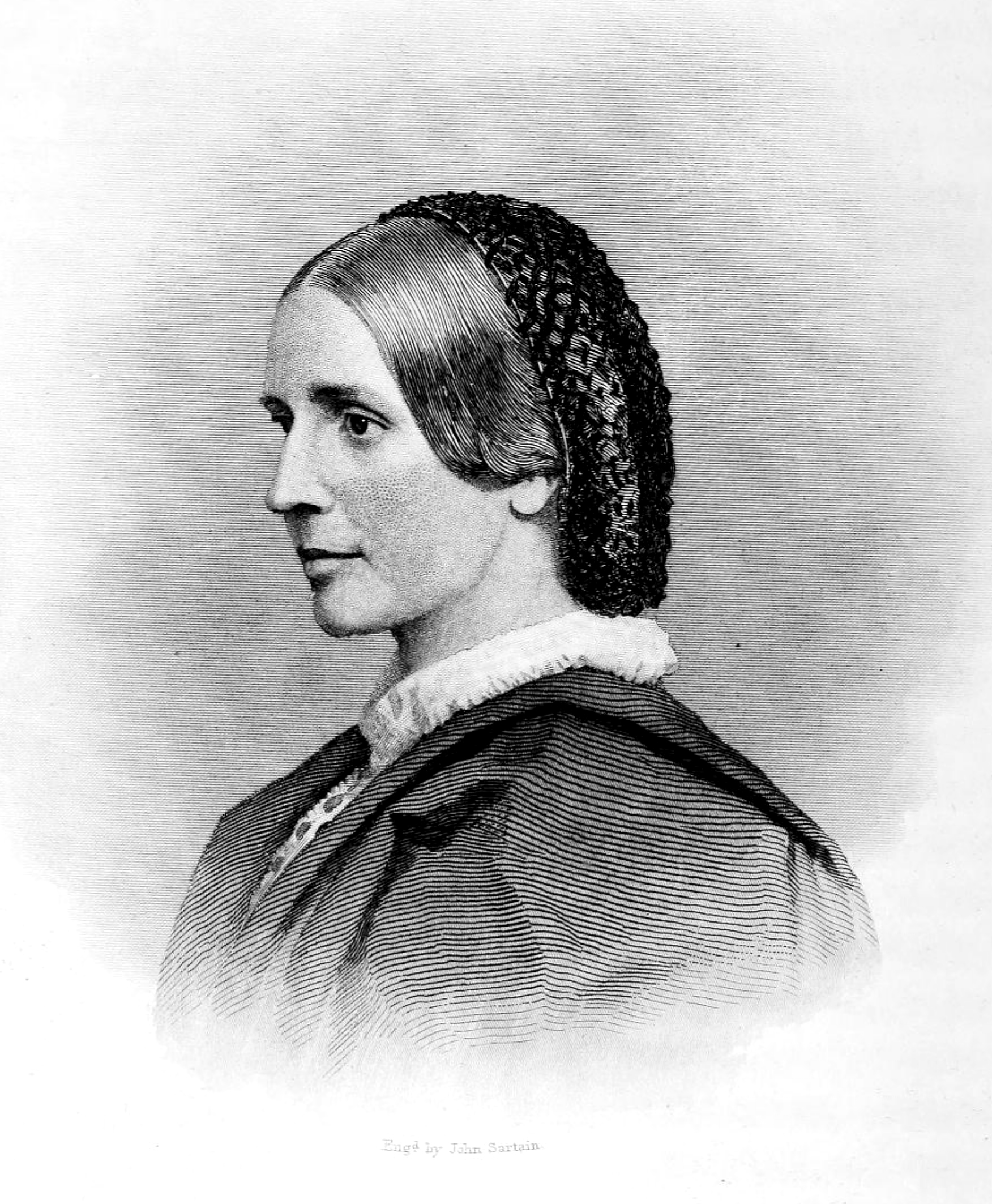
- Born: March 8, 1824; Taunton, Massachusetts
- Died: 1880 (aged 55–56); Cambridge, Massachusetts
- Burial place: Mount Auburn Cemetery
- Education: Cambridge High School
- Known for: Founder of Mount Auburn Hospital
- Father: Theophilus Parsons
- Relatives: Theophilus Parsons (grandfather)

Emily Elizabeth Parsons (1824 – 1880) was an American Civil War nurse, hospital administrator, and founder of Mount Auburn Hospital in Massachusetts. Her posthumous memoir, Fearless Purpose: Memoir of Emily Elizabeth Parsons, gives a rare glimpse of the American Civil War from a nurse's perspective as she describes her work tending to Union soldiers and managing the nursing staff at Benton Barracks Hospital in St. Louis, Missouri.

== Early years ==
Parsons was born in Taunton, Massachusetts, on March 8, 1824, the eldest of seven children. Her father was Theophilus Parsons, a lawyer and supporter of Abraham Lincoln, and Dane Professor of Law at Harvard University. Her mother was Catherine Amory (Chandler) Parsons. She grew up in Cambridge, Massachusetts, where she graduated from Cambridge High School.

During childhood, an accident left her blind in one eye and scarlet fever left her partially deaf. Because of an ankle injury she suffered as a young woman, she was unable to stand for prolonged periods of time.

== Training in Massachusetts and work at Ft. Schuyler ==
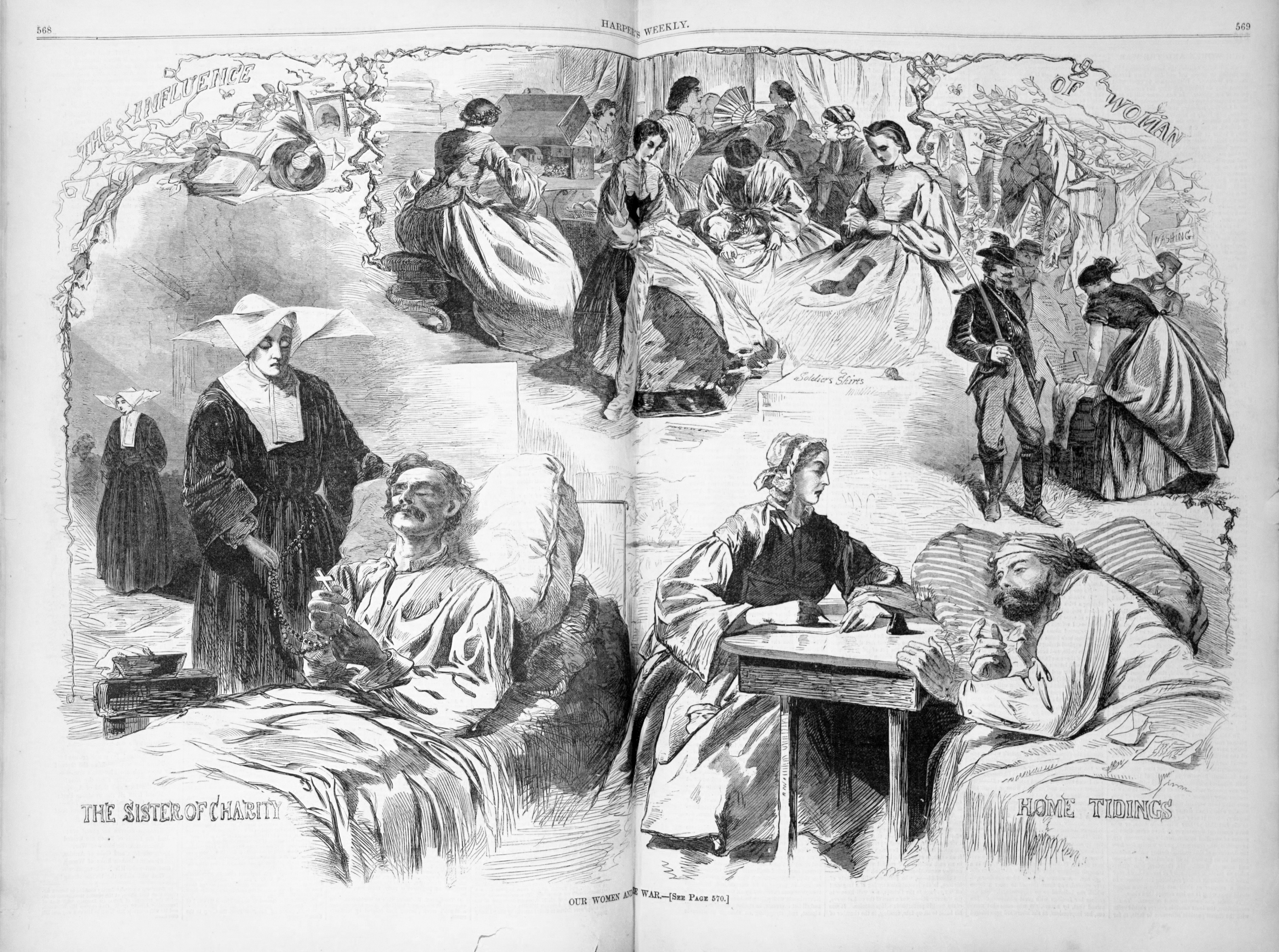
Harper's Magazine Illustration of Civil War Nurses

Before the American Civil War, military nursing in the United States was dominated by men and was not viewed as a good career for women. However, the massive amount of illness and number of casualties on both sides of the war brought women of all ages and economic classes to the sometimes makeshift hospitals that were set up during the war. When the Civil War broke out in 1861, Parsons, at the age of 37, expressed a desire to assist the Union army by working as a nurse. Her father tried to dissuade her, since he felt with all of her disabilities, she would not be very useful as a nurse and might put her own health in danger. Nonetheless, she began training as a volunteer at the Massachusetts General Hospital. After eighteen months, she was put in charge of a ward of fifty wounded Union soldiers at Fort Schuyler Military Hospital on Long Island in October 1862.

For two months, she performed nursing duties at Ft. Schuyler, sending letters back home that would later be published posthumously as her memoir. In her letters, she tells of preparing men for amputations and sometimes death while snow and rain poured in through the slats of the hospital roof, and the wind rocked the building outside. When her father again expresses concern that she is too sick to continue the life of a military nurse, she reminds him that she, like her brother, has committed to a military life: "Remember that I am in the army just as Chauncy is and I must be held to work just as he is; you would never think of requesting that he not be sent on picket duty because it was hard work." Despite her commitment, her health continued to deteriorate, and she had to take a break from her responsibilities and return home.

== St. Louis and the Battle of Vicksburg ==
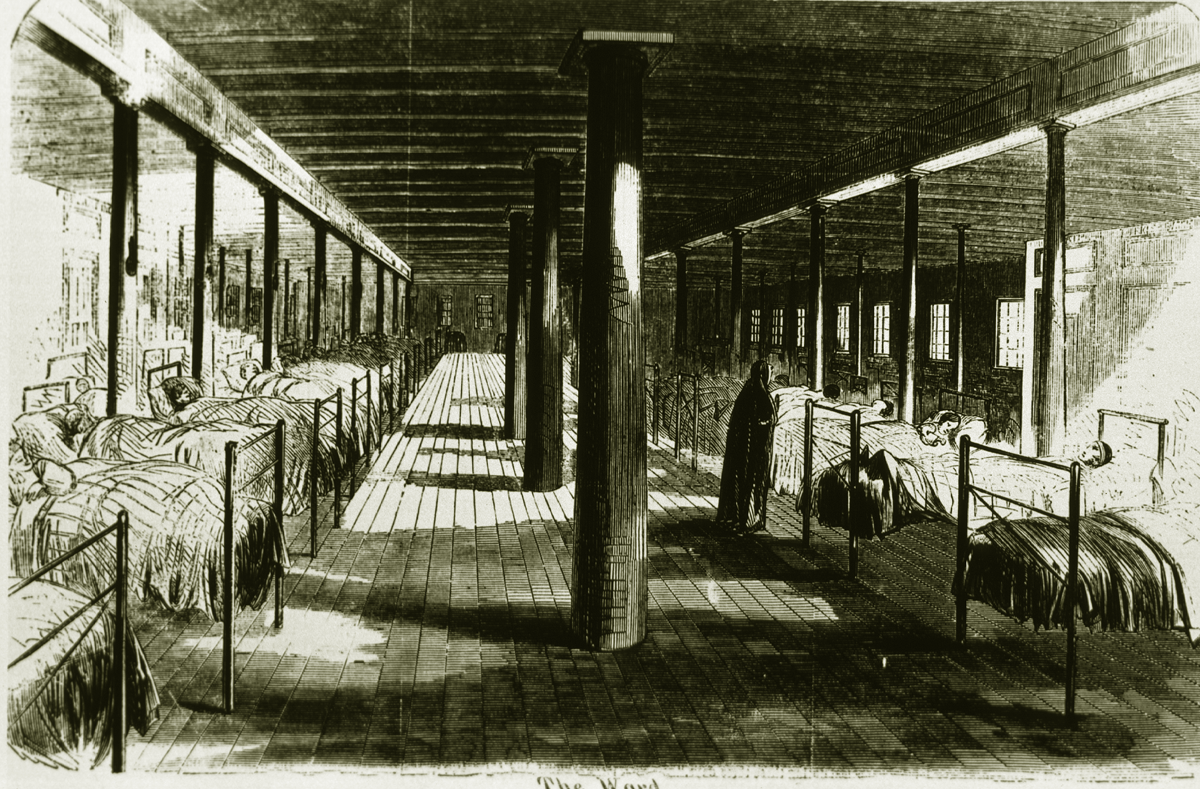
Interior of Red Rover Civil War hospital steamship published in Harper's Weekly

While recuperating, Parsons wrote to Dorothea Dix, superintendent of Union nurses who had actively campaigned for the rights of women to become military nurses, offering her services wherever they might be needed. She also befriended writer and political activist Jessie Benton Fremont, who recommended Parsons to the Western Sanitary Commission at St. Louis, and in January, 1863, Parsons left Massachusetts for St. Louis, Missouri. When she arrived, the city was crowded with sick and wounded soldiers, and available buildings were quickly being converted to hospitals. She was assigned to the Lawson Hospital.

She was only at the Lawson Hospital for a few weeks, when she was reassigned to the hospital steamship City of Alton, which travelled down the Mississippi River during the Vicksburg campaign. At Vicksburg, Mississippi, four hundred invalid soldiers were brought on board the ship, most of them sick with fever, many of them past recovery, and returned as far as Memphis, Tennessee. Black men and women escaping slavery were also brought on board. From the steamship, Parsons again sent letters home, writing of the clouds of exploding shells being fired back and forth between the Union and Confederate armies. In one anecdote, she tells of a freed slave walking past with creaking boots, and how another freedman calls out to her, "Ah Jane, your boots cry out for freedom!". Many of the wounded soldiers died on the passage up the river. During this period, Parsons contracted malaria. From that point on, she had recurrent bouts of fever. At Memphis, after the sick and wounded had been transferred to the hospitals, an order was received from General Ulysses S. Grant to load the boat with active soldiers and return immediately to Vicksburg. Parsons, along with the other female nurses, returned to St. Louis.

== Benton Barracks Hospital in St. Louis ==
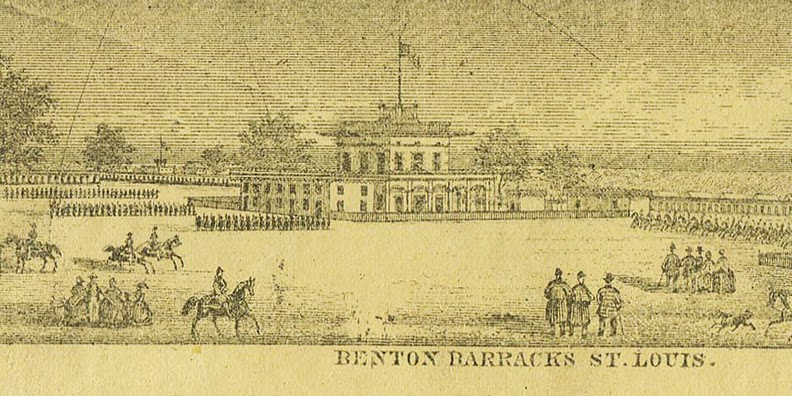
19th Century Illustration of Benton Barracks, St. Louis

In St. Louis, Parsons acted as supervisor of nurses at Benton Barracks Hospital, the largest hospital in the American West, with 2,000 patients. Wounded black and white soldiers were segregated, with the main amphitheater turned into the hospital for black troops. Parsons' letters describe both the conflict and the hope that the wounded black soldiers brought. "There is too much a feeling among many here that they must be treated like inferior beings," she says, "They are only inferior from neglect, that is, I hope I can see my way clear to do my duty by them and all.” As supervising nurse, she also spoke with women of the Colored Ladies Aid Society who had to fight for the right to sit on the street cars that travelled to the wounded black soldiers' hospital and told her "things that would make your blood boil." The hospital, she writes, is doing more than taking care of the bodies of the black soldiers, "it is bringing to the surface facts, and establishing precedents with the enemy. It is storming the citadel." She also trained the inexperienced women, black and white, who arrived at the hospital to volunteer their services as nurses. Under her management, the hospital's death rate was significantly reduced. Towards the end of the Civil War, the hospital began to treat the black freedmen and refugees of all races who were then pouring into St. Louis from the South. Even while she was suffering bouts of malaria, Parsons continued to direct the nurses at the hospital from her sick-bed. Though her decline in health eventually caused her to return to Cambridge, she continued to send boxes of gardening seeds and clothing to the freedmen and refugees at Barracks Hospital, so they could begin a new life in Missouri.

== Founding of Cambridge Hospital ==
After the war, Parsons returned to Cambridge, and devoted the next six years to raising money for a hospital there. In 1869, she obtained a charter for what was then called Cambridge Hospital, located in a rented house. The hospital was only open until 1872, when it was forced to close due to lack of funds. However, it was re-opened again in 1886 after Parson's death and the name was changed to Mt. Auburn Hospital.

== Death and legacy ==
Parsons died of apoplexy, or stroke, in 1880. She is buried at Mount Auburn Cemetery.

Her father published selected letters she wrote to her family as a memoir after her death, with an introduction. Her work has been cited along with writings by Clara Barton, Susie Taylor and Louisa May Alcott as one of the few memoirs available to researchers on the daily lives of the 3,000 women who served as military nurses during the American Civil War.

Mt. Auburn Hospital continues to serve patients in Cambridge, Massachusetts.
