= Benton Barracks =

Former barracks in Missouri, United States

Coordinates: 38.664°N 90.218°W

- St. Louis, Missouri
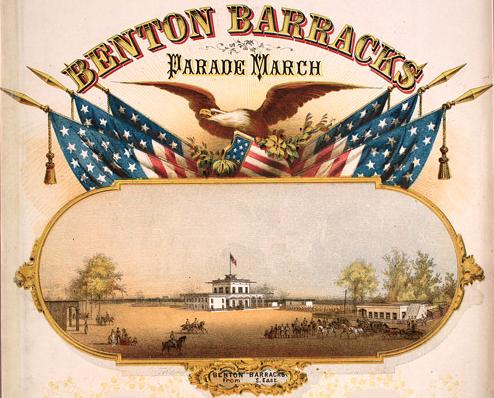
- Benton Barracks Parade March (1862)

Site information
- Type: Barracks
- Owner: United States Army

Site history
- Built: August 1861
- In use: 1861–1865
- Events: American Civil War

Garrison information
- Past commanders: John C. Frémont (1861); William T. Sherman (1861–62); Benjamin Bonneville (1862–65)

Benton Barracks, also known as Camp Benton, was a United States Army barracks in St. Louis, Missouri, located at present-day St. Louis Fairground Park. Before the American Civil War, the site was owned and used by the St. Louis Agricultural and Mechanical Association, which at the time was located on the outskirts of St. Louis. The installation was used primarily as a training facility for federal soldiers attached to the Western Division of the Union Army.

After the Battle of Lexington, the post and convalescent hospitals were added to the training barracks, in order to assist in treating hundreds of incoming wounded troops. Once the war ended, the barracks was dismantled, returning to its pre-war, civilian use as a fairground and race track. Nothing of the original barracks remains at this site today.

== History ==
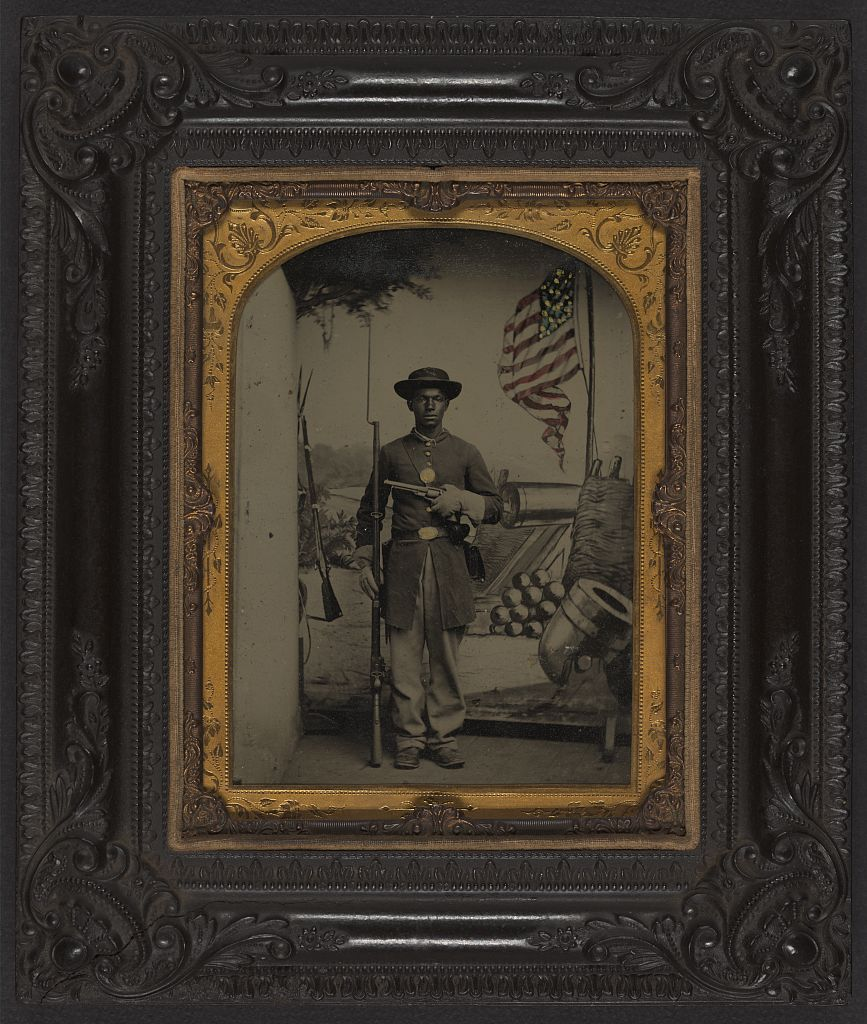
Portrait of African American Union soldier at Benton Barracks

In 1861, Major-General John C. Frémont assumed command of the Western Department of War for the Union Army. General Frémont ordered the establishment of a training barracks at the site of the St. Louis Fairgrounds. The barracks originally consisted of five buildings, 740 ft. in length and 40 ft. in width. Additionally, there was a two-story building erected for the headquarters of the Barracks Commander. The barracks could accommodate up to 30,000 soldiers. By 1863, Benton contained over a mile of barracks, as well as warehouses, cavalry stables, parade grounds, and a large military hospital. The hospital was built from the converted amphitheater on the fairground site and could accommodate 2,000 to 3,000 soldiers at a time. During the Civil War, under the administration of Emily Elizabeth Parsons, it was the largest hospital in the West. Parsons recorded many of her experiences at Benton Barracks in her memoir. Another nurse at Benton Barracks, Belle Coddington, wrote about her memories of the hospital in an 1895 reminiscence.
