= 18th Missouri Infantry Regiment =

- Active: July 1861 - July 1865
- Country: United States of America
- Allegiance: Union
- Branch: Union Army
- Type: Infantry
- Size: 705 men (at outset of first campaigning)
- Engagements: American Civil War: Siege of Island No. 10; Battle of Shiloh; Siege of Corinth; Second Battle of Corinth; Battle of Resaca; Battle of Dallas; Battle of Kennesaw Mountain; Atlanta campaign; March to the Sea; Selkehatchie; Bentonville; Bennett's House

Commanders
- Colonel of the Regiment: Madison Miller, Charles Sheldon

The 18th Missouri Infantry Regiment was a Union Army unit organized during the American Civil War.

== History ==
Organized at Laclede, Missouri, July to November, 1861. Attached to:

- District of St. Louis, Department of Missouri, to March, 1862.
- 2nd Brigade, 6th Division, Army of the Tennessee, to July, 1862.
- 2nd Brigade, 6th Division, District of Corinth, Miss., to November, 1862.
- 2nd Brigade, 6th Division, District of Corinth, 13th Army Corps (Old), Dept. of the Tennessee, November, 1862.
- 3rd Brigade, District of Corinth, 13th Army Corps, to December, 1862.
- 3rd Brigade, District of Corinth, 17th Army Corps, to January, 1863.
- 3rd Brigade, District of Corinth, 16th Army Corps, to March, 1863.
- 3rd Brigade, 2nd Division, 16th Army Corps, to November, 1863.
- Fuller's Brigade, 2nd Division, 16th Army Corps, to January, 1864.
- 3rd Brigade, 2nd Division, 16th Army Corps, to March, 1864.
- 1st Brigade, 4th Division, 16th Army Corps, to September, 1864.
- 1st Brigade, 1st Division, 17th Army Corps, to July, 1865.

== Detailed Service ==
In his report for 1863 the adjutant-general of Missouri says: "This regiment was formed in Aug., 1861, and has taken part in many of the most important engagements of the war in the West. The want of regimental reports prevents this office from giving that complete statement of its doings that is desired. It has lost largely in officers and men, especially at the Battle of Shiloh, but has been steadily recruited, and now has a good aggregate for a regiment that has been so depleted." During the first two months of 1864 it was mounted and employed in scouting the country about Florence, Ala. It then joined the army of Gen. Sherman, where it was assigned to the 17th Corps, and began the advance upon Atlanta, taking part in the engagements at Snake Creek Gap, Resaca, Kingston, Dallas, Big Shanty, Kennesaw Mountain, along the Chattahoochee River in front of Atlanta and at Jonesboro. When Gen. Hood evacuated Atlanta and started north this regiment was one of those in pursuit, drove the rear-guard of the enemy through Snake Creek Gap and skirmished with him at various other points. It then rejoined the main body of the army and was in the famous March to the Sea, participating in all the engagements in which the 17th Corps was brought into action. In the early part of 1865 the regiment marched with Sherman across the Carolinas. It was the 18th Mo. that forced the crossing of Whippy's Swamp and the Pedee River at Cheraw; was present at the Capture of Columbia and Fayetteville, N. C.; fought with its customary valor in the battle of Bentonville, N. C., and was present when Gen. Johnston surrendered to Sherman at Goldsboro. It then moved to Washington, D. C. where it took part in the Grand Review in May, after which it went by rail and river via Louisville, Ky., to St. Louis, where it was mustered out on July 18, 1865.

== Casualties ==
Regiment lost during service 6 Officers and 75 Enlisted men killed and mortally wounded and 164 Enlisted men by disease. Total 245.
