= Political party strength in Missouri =

Politics in the US state of Missouri

The following table indicates the party of elected officials in the U.S. state of Missouri:

- Governor
- Lieutenant Governor
- Secretary of State
- Attorney General
- State Treasurer
- State Auditor

The table also indicates the historical party composition in the:

- State Senate
- State House of Representatives
- State delegation to the U.S. Senate
- State delegation to the U.S. House of Representatives

For years in which a presidential election was held, the table indicates which party's nominees received the state's electoral votes.

Year	Executive offices						State Legislature		United States Congress			Electoral College
Year	Governor	Lt. Governor	Secretary of State	Attorney General	Treasurer	Auditor	Senate	House	Senator (Class I)	Senator (Class III)	House	Electoral College
1820	Alexander McNair (DR)	William H. Ashley (DR)	Joshua Barton (DR)	Edward Bates (DR)	John Peter Didier (I)	William Christy (DR)	[?]	[?]				Monroe/ Tompkins (DR) ✓ (Note: Electoral votes disputed due to Missouri's pending statehood status.)
1821	Alexander McNair (DR)	William H. Ashley (DR)	William Grymes Pettus (DR)	Rufus Easton (DR)	Nathaniel Simonds (DR)	William V. Rector (DR)	[?]	[?]	Thomas Hart Benton (DR)	David Barton (DR)	John Scott (DR)	Monroe/ Tompkins (DR) ✓
1822	Alexander McNair (DR)	William H. Ashley (DR)	William Grymes Pettus (DR)	Rufus Easton (DR)	Nathaniel Simonds (DR)	William V. Rector (DR)	[?]	[?]	Thomas Hart Benton (DR)	David Barton (DR)	John Scott (DR)	Monroe/ Tompkins (DR) ✓
1823	Alexander McNair (DR)	William H. Ashley (DR)	William Grymes Pettus (DR)	Rufus Easton (DR)	Nathaniel Simonds (DR)	Elias Barcroft (DR)	[?]	[?]	Thomas Hart Benton (DR)	David Barton (DR)	John Scott (DR)	Monroe/ Tompkins (DR) ✓
1824	Alexander McNair (DR)	William H. Ashley (DR)	Hamilton Rowan Gamble (DR)	Rufus Easton (DR)	Nathaniel Simonds (DR)	Elias Barcroft (DR)	[?]	[?]	Thomas Hart Benton (DR)	David Barton (DR)	John Scott (DR)	Clay/ Calhoun (DR) ✗
1825	Frederick Bates (DR)	Benjamin Harrison Reeves (DR)	Hamilton Rowan Gamble (DR)	Rufus Easton (DR)	Nathaniel Simonds (DR)	Elias Barcroft (DR)	[?]	[?]	Thomas Hart Benton (J)	David Barton (NR)	John Scott (NR)	Clay/ Calhoun (DR) ✗
1825	Abraham J. Williams (DR)	vacant	Hamilton Rowan Gamble (DR)	Rufus Easton (DR)	Nathaniel Simonds (DR)	Elias Barcroft (DR)	[?]	[?]	Thomas Hart Benton (J)	David Barton (NR)	John Scott (NR)	Clay/ Calhoun (DR) ✗
1826	John Miller (D)	vacant	Spencer Pettis (D)	Robert William Wells (D)	Nathaniel Simonds (DR)	Elias Barcroft (DR)	[?]	[?]	Thomas Hart Benton (J)	David Barton (NR)	John Scott (NR)	Clay/ Calhoun (DR) ✗
1827	John Miller (D)	vacant	Spencer Pettis (D)	Robert William Wells (D)	Nathaniel Simonds (DR)	Elias Barcroft (DR)	[?]	[?]	Thomas Hart Benton (J)	David Barton (NR)	Edward Bates (DR)	Clay/ Calhoun (DR) ✗
1828	John Miller (D)	vacant	Spencer Pettis (D)	Robert William Wells (D)	Nathaniel Simonds (DR)	Elias Barcroft (DR)	[?]	[?]	Thomas Hart Benton (J)	David Barton (NR)	Edward Bates (DR)	Jackson/ Calhoun (D) ✓
1829	John Miller (D)	Daniel Dunklin (D)	Priestly H. McBride (D)	Robert William Wells (D)	James Earickson (D)	Elias Barcroft (DR)	[?]	[?]	Thomas Hart Benton (J)	David Barton (NR)	Spencer Pettis (J)	Jackson/ Calhoun (D) ✓
1830	John Miller (D)	Daniel Dunklin (D)	John C. Edwards (D)	Robert William Wells (D)	James Earickson (D)	Elias Barcroft (DR)	[?]	[?]	Thomas Hart Benton (J)	David Barton (NR)	Spencer Pettis (J)	Jackson/ Calhoun (D) ✓
1831	John Miller (D)	Daniel Dunklin (D)	John C. Edwards (D)	Robert William Wells (D)	James Earickson (D)	Elias Barcroft (DR)	[?]	[?]	Thomas Hart Benton (J)	Alexander Buckner (J)	William H. Ashley (J)	Jackson/ Calhoun (D) ✓
1832	John Miller (D)	Daniel Dunklin (D)	John C. Edwards (D)	Robert William Wells (D)	James Earickson (D)	Elias Barcroft (DR)	[?]	[?]	Thomas Hart Benton (J)	Alexander Buckner (J)	William H. Ashley (J)	Jackson/ Buren (D) ✓
1833	Daniel Dunklin (D)	Lilburn Boggs (D)	John C. Edwards (D)	Robert William Wells (D)	John Walker (D)	Henry Shurlds (D)	[?]	[?]	Thomas Hart Benton (J)	Lewis F. Linn (J)	1J, 1NR (Note: Elected at large on a general ticket.)	Jackson/ Buren (D) ✓
1834	Daniel Dunklin (D)	Lilburn Boggs (D)	John C. Edwards (D)	Robert William Wells (D)	John Walker (D)	Henry Shurlds (D)	[?]	[?]	Thomas Hart Benton (J)	Lewis F. Linn (J)	1J, 1NR	Jackson/ Buren (D) ✓
1835	Daniel Dunklin (D)	Lilburn Boggs (D)	Henry Shurlds (D)	Robert William Wells (D)	John Walker (D)	Peter Garland Glover (D)	16D, 7W, 1?	47D, 22W, 3?	Thomas Hart Benton (J)	Lewis F. Linn (J)	2J	Jackson/ Buren (D) ✓
1836	Daniel Dunklin (D)	Lilburn Boggs (D)	Henry Shurlds (D)	William Barclay Napton (D)	John Walker (D)	Peter Garland Glover (D)	16D, 7W, 1?	47D, 22W, 3?	Thomas Hart Benton (J)	Lewis F. Linn (J)	2J	Buren/ Johnson (D) ✓
1836	Lilburn Boggs (D)	vacant	Henry Shurlds (D)	William Barclay Napton (D)	John Walker (D)	Peter Garland Glover (D)	16D, 7W, 1?	47D, 22W, 3?	Thomas Hart Benton (J)	Lewis F. Linn (J)	2J	Buren/ Johnson (D) ✓
1837	Lilburn Boggs (D)	Franklin Cannon (D)	John C. Edwards (D)	William Barclay Napton (D)	John Walker (D)	Peter Garland Glover (D)	20D, 4W	60D, 17W, 3?	Thomas Hart Benton (D)	Lewis F. Linn (D)	2D	Buren/ Johnson (D) ✓
1837	Lilburn Boggs (D)	Franklin Cannon (D)	Peter Garland Glover (D)	William Barclay Napton (D)	John Walker (D)	Hiram H. Baber	20D, 4W	60D, 17W, 3?	Thomas Hart Benton (D)	Lewis F. Linn (D)	2D	Buren/ Johnson (D) ✓
1838	Lilburn Boggs (D)	Franklin Cannon (D)	Peter Garland Glover (D)	William Barclay Napton (D)	John Walker (D)	Hiram H. Baber	20D, 4W	60D, 17W, 3?	Thomas Hart Benton (D)	Lewis F. Linn (D)	2D	Buren/ Johnson (D) ✓
1838	Lilburn Boggs (D)	Franklin Cannon (D)	Peter Garland Glover (D)	William Barclay Napton (D)	Abraham McClellan	Hiram H. Baber	20D, 4W	60D, 17W, 3?	Thomas Hart Benton (D)	Lewis F. Linn (D)	2D	Buren/ Johnson (D) ✓
1839	Lilburn Boggs (D)	Franklin Cannon (D)	James L. Minor (D)	Samuel M. Bay (D)	Abraham McClellan	Hiram H. Baber	20D, 13W	58D, 39W	Thomas Hart Benton (D)	Lewis F. Linn (D)	2D	Buren/ Johnson (D) ✓
1840	Lilburn Boggs (D)	Franklin Cannon (D)	James L. Minor (D)	Samuel M. Bay (D)	Abraham McClellan	Hiram H. Baber	20D, 13W	58D, 39W	Thomas Hart Benton (D)	Lewis F. Linn (D)	2D	Buren/ Johnson (D) ✗
1841	Thomas Reynolds (D)	Meredith Marmaduke (D)	James L. Minor (D)	Samuel M. Bay (D)	Abraham McClellan	Hiram H. Baber	18D, 15W	55D, 44W, 1?	Thomas Hart Benton (D)	Lewis F. Linn (D)	2D	Buren/ Johnson (D) ✗
1842	Thomas Reynolds (D)	Meredith Marmaduke (D)	James L. Minor (D)	Samuel M. Bay (D)	Abraham McClellan	Hiram H. Baber	18D, 15W	55D, 44W, 1?	Thomas Hart Benton (D)	Lewis F. Linn (D)	2D	Buren/ Johnson (D) ✗
1843	Thomas Reynolds (D)	Meredith Marmaduke (D)	James L. Minor (D)	Samuel M. Bay (D)	Peter Garland Glover (D)	Hiram H. Baber	23D, 10W	74D, 26W	Thomas Hart Benton (D)	David Rice Atchison (D)	5D	Buren/ Johnson (D) ✗
1844	Meredith Marmaduke (D)	vacant	James L. Minor (D)	Samuel M. Bay (D)	Peter Garland Glover (D)	Hiram H. Baber	23D, 10W	74D, 26W	Thomas Hart Benton (D)	David Rice Atchison (D)	5D	Polk/ Dallas (D) ✓
1845	John C. Edwards (D)	James Young (D)	Faulkland H. Martin (D)	Benjamin F. Stringfellow (D)	Peter Garland Glover (D)	William Monroe (D)	24D, 9W	56D, 44W	Thomas Hart Benton (D)	David Rice Atchison (D)	5D	Polk/ Dallas (D) ✓
1845	John C. Edwards (D)	James Young (D)	Faulkland H. Martin (D)	Benjamin F. Stringfellow (D)	Peter Garland Glover (D)	James W. McDearmon (D)	24D, 9W	56D, 44W	Thomas Hart Benton (D)	David Rice Atchison (D)	5D	Polk/ Dallas (D) ✓
1846	John C. Edwards (D)	James Young (D)	Faulkland H. Martin (D)	Benjamin F. Stringfellow (D)	Peter Garland Glover (D)	James W. McDearmon (D)	24D, 9W	56D, 44W	Thomas Hart Benton (D)	David Rice Atchison (D)	5D	Polk/ Dallas (D) ✓
1847	John C. Edwards (D)	James Young (D)	Faulkland H. Martin (D)	Benjamin F. Stringfellow (D)	Peter Garland Glover (D)	James W. McDearmon (D)	23D, 3W, 2KN, 5?	76D, 19W, 3KN, 2?	Thomas Hart Benton (D)	David Rice Atchison (D)	5D	Polk/ Dallas (D) ✓
1848	John C. Edwards (D)	James Young (D)	Faulkland H. Martin (D)	Benjamin F. Stringfellow (D)	Peter Garland Glover (D)	George W. Miller (D)	23D, 3W, 2KN, 5?	76D, 19W, 3KN, 2?	Thomas Hart Benton (D)	David Rice Atchison (D)	5D	Cass/ Butler (D) ✗
1849	Austin A. King (D)	Thomas L. Price (D)	Ephraim Brevard Ewing (D)	William A. Robards (D)	Peter Garland Glover (D)	Wilson Brown (D)	24D, 2W, 2KN, 5?	65D, 24W, 11?	Thomas Hart Benton (D)	David Rice Atchison (D)	5D	Cass/ Butler (D) ✗
1850	Austin A. King (D)	Thomas L. Price (D)	Ephraim Brevard Ewing (D)	William A. Robards (D)	Peter Garland Glover (D)	Wilson Brown (D)	24D, 2W, 2KN, 5?	65D, 24W, 11?	Thomas Hart Benton (D)	David Rice Atchison (D)	5D	Cass/ Butler (D) ✗
1851	Austin A. King (D)	Thomas L. Price (D)	Ephraim Brevard Ewing (D)	James B. Gardenhire (W)	Alfred William Morrison (D)	Wilson Brown (D)	13BD, 8A-BD, 12W	48A-BD, 27BD, 53W	Henry S. Geyer (W)	David Rice Atchison (D)	3W, 2D	Cass/ Butler (D) ✗
1852	Austin A. King (D)	Thomas L. Price (D)	Ephraim Brevard Ewing (D)	James B. Gardenhire (W)	Alfred William Morrison (D)	Abraham Fulkerson (D)	13BD, 8A-BD, 12W	48A-BD, 27BD, 53W	Henry S. Geyer (W)	David Rice Atchison (D)	3W, 2D	Pierce/ King (D) ✓
1853	Sterling Price (D)	Wilson Brown (D)	John M. Richardson (D)	James B. Gardenhire (W)	Alfred William Morrison (D)	William H. Buffington (D)	22D, 11W	86D, 39W, 5?	Henry S. Geyer (W)	David Rice Atchison (D)	4W, 3D	Pierce/ King (D) ✓
1854	Sterling Price (D)	Wilson Brown (D)	John M. Richardson (D)	James B. Gardenhire (W)	Alfred William Morrison (D)	William H. Buffington (D)	22D, 11W	86D, 39W, 5?	Henry S. Geyer (W)	David Rice Atchison (D)	4W, 3D	Pierce/ King (D) ✓
1855	Sterling Price (D)	Wilson Brown (D)	John M. Richardson (D)	James B. Gardenhire (W)	Alfred William Morrison (D)	William H. Buffington (D)	13A-BD, 8BD, 12W	46A-BD, 34BD, 48W, 2?	Henry S. Geyer (W)	vacant	5W, 1D, 1KN	Pierce/ King (D) ✓
1856	Sterling Price (D)	Wilson Brown (D)	John M. Richardson (D)	James B. Gardenhire (W)	Alfred William Morrison (D)	William H. Buffington (D)	13A-BD, 8BD, 12W	46A-BD, 34BD, 48W, 2?	Henry S. Geyer (W)	vacant	5W, 1D, 1KN	Buchanan/ Breckinridge (D) ✓
1857	Trusten Polk (D)	Hancock Lee Jackson (D)	Benjamin F. Massey (D)	Ephraim Brevard Ewing (D)	Alfred William Morrison (D)	William H. Buffington (D)	17A-BD, 4BD, 4W, 8KN	71A-BD, 32BD, 4W, 25KN, 1 vac.	Henry S. Geyer (W)	James S. Green (D)	3D, 2KN, 1W, 1R	Buchanan/ Breckinridge (D) ✓
1857	Hancock Lee Jackson (D)	vacant	Benjamin F. Massey (D)	Ephraim Brevard Ewing (D)	Alfred William Morrison (D)	William H. Buffington (D)	17A-BD, 4BD, 4W, 8KN	71A-BD, 32BD, 4W, 25KN, 1 vac.	Trusten Polk (D)	James S. Green (D)	3D, 2KN, 1W, 1R	Buchanan/ Breckinridge (D) ✓
1858	Robert Marcellus Stewart (D)	Hancock Lee Jackson (D)	Benjamin F. Massey (D)	J. Proctor Knott (D)	Alfred William Morrison (D)	William H. Buffington (D)	17A-BD, 4BD, 4W, 8KN	71A-BD, 32BD, 4W, 25KN, 1 vac.	Trusten Polk (D)	James S. Green (D)	3D, 2KN, 1W, 1R	Buchanan/ Breckinridge (D) ✓
1859	Robert Marcellus Stewart (D)	Hancock Lee Jackson (D)	Benjamin F. Massey (D)	J. Proctor Knott (D)	Alfred William Morrison (D)	William H. Buffington (D)	24D, 9O	87D, 46O	Trusten Polk (D)	James S. Green (D)	5D, 1ID, 1KN	Buchanan/ Breckinridge (D) ✓
1860	Robert Marcellus Stewart (D)	Hancock Lee Jackson (D)	Benjamin F. Massey (D)	J. Proctor Knott (D)	Alfred William Morrison (D)	William H. Buffington (D)	24D, 9O	87D, 46O	Trusten Polk (D)	James S. Green (D)	5D, 1ID, 1KN	Buchanan/ Breckinridge (D) ✓
1860	Robert Marcellus Stewart (D)	Hancock Lee Jackson (D)	Benjamin F. Massey (D)	J. Proctor Knott (D)	Alfred William Morrison (D)	William H. Buffington (D)	24D, 9O	87D, 46O	Trusten Polk (D)	James S. Green (D)	4D, 1ID, 1KN, 1R	Buchanan/ Breckinridge (D) ✓
1860	Robert Marcellus Stewart (D)	Hancock Lee Jackson (D)	Benjamin F. Massey (D)	J. Proctor Knott (D)	Alfred William Morrison (D)	William H. Buffington (D)	24D, 9O	87D, 46O	Trusten Polk (D)	James S. Green (D)	5D, 1ID, 1KN	Douglas/ Johnson (D) ✗
1861	Claiborne Fox Jackson (D)	Thomas Caute Reynolds (D)	Mordecai Oliver (U)	Aikman Welch (D)	Alfred William Morrison (D)	W. S. Moseley (D)	25D, 8CU	85D, 47CU	Trusten Polk (D)	Waldo P. Johnson (D)	5D, 1NU, 1R	Douglas/ Johnson (D) ✗
1861	Hamilton Rowan Gamble (R)	Willard P. Hall (R)	Mordecai Oliver (U)	Aikman Welch (D)	Alfred William Morrison (D)	W. S. Moseley (D)	25D, 8CU	85D, 47CU	Trusten Polk (D)	Waldo P. Johnson (D)	5D, 1NU, 1R	Douglas/ Johnson (D) ✗
1862	Hamilton Rowan Gamble (R)	Willard P. Hall (R)	Mordecai Oliver (U)	Aikman Welch (D)	George Caleb Bingham (D)	W. S. Moseley (D)	25D, 8CU	85D, 47CU	John B. Henderson (U)	Robert Wilson (U)	5D, 1NU, 1R	Douglas/ Johnson (D) ✗
1863	Hamilton Rowan Gamble (R)	Willard P. Hall (R)	Mordecai Oliver (U)	Aikman Welch (D)	George Caleb Bingham (D)	W. S. Moseley (D)	22R, 11D	59R, 38D, 28?, 11 vac.	John B. Henderson (UU)	Robert Wilson (UU)	6NU, 3R	Douglas/ Johnson (D) ✗
1864	Willard P. Hall (R)	vacant	Mordecai Oliver (U)	Thomas Theodore Crittenden (D)	George Caleb Bingham (D)	W. S. Moseley (D)	22R, 11D	59R, 38D, 28?, 11 vac.	John B. Henderson (UU)	B. Gratz Brown (UU)	6NU, 2R, 1D	Lincoln/ Johnson (NU) ✓
1865	Thomas Clement Fletcher (R)	George Rappeen Smith (R)	Francis A. Rodman (R)	Robert F. Wingate (D)	William Bishop (R)	Alonzo Thompson (R)	25R, 8D	103R, 26D, 6?, 3 vac.	John B. Henderson (R)	B. Gratz Brown (R)	6R, 2D, 1NU	Lincoln/ Johnson (NU) ✓
1866	Thomas Clement Fletcher (R)	George Rappeen Smith (R)	Francis A. Rodman (R)	Robert F. Wingate (D)	William Bishop (R)	Alonzo Thompson (R)	25R, 8D	103R, 26D, 6?, 3 vac.	John B. Henderson (R)	B. Gratz Brown (R)	6R, 2D, 1NU	Lincoln/ Johnson (NU) ✓
1867	Thomas Clement Fletcher (R)	George Rappeen Smith (R)	Francis A. Rodman (R)	Robert F. Wingate (D)	William Bishop (R)	Alonzo Thompson (R)	26R, 8D	92R, 40D, 3?, 3 vac.	John B. Henderson (R)	Charles D. Drake (R)	8R, 1D	Lincoln/ Johnson (NU) ✓
1868	Thomas Clement Fletcher (R)	George Rappeen Smith (R)	Francis A. Rodman (R)	Robert F. Wingate (D)	William Bishop (R)	Alonzo Thompson (R)	26R, 8D	92R, 40D, 3?, 3 vac.	John B. Henderson (R)	Charles D. Drake (R)	8R, 1D	Grant/ Colfax (R) ✓
1869	Joseph W. McClurg (R)	Edwin O. Stanard (R)	Francis A. Rodman (R)	Horace B. Johnson (R)	William Q. Dallmeyer (R)	Daniel Draper (R)	25R, 9D	92R, 36D, 5?, 5 vac.	Carl Schurz (R)	Charles D. Drake (R)	7R, 2D	Grant/ Colfax (R) ✓
1870	Joseph W. McClurg (R)	Edwin O. Stanard (R)	Francis A. Rodman (R)	Horace B. Johnson (R)	William Q. Dallmeyer (R)	Daniel Draper (R)	25R, 9D	92R, 36D, 5?, 5 vac.	Carl Schurz (R)	Charles D. Drake (R)	7R, 2D	Grant/ Colfax (R) ✓
1871	B. Gratz Brown (LR)	Joseph J. Gravely (LR)	Eugene F. Weigel (D)	Andrew Jackson Baker (R)	Samuel Hays (R)	Daniel Draper (R)	19R, 14D, 1?	78D, 23R, 20Lib, 16Fus, 1I	Carl Schurz (R)	Daniel T. Jewett (R)	4R, 4D, 1LR	Grant/ Colfax (R) ✓
1871	B. Gratz Brown (LR)	Joseph J. Gravely (LR)	Eugene F. Weigel (D)	Andrew Jackson Baker (R)	Samuel Hays (R)	Daniel Draper (R)	19R, 14D, 1?	78D, 23R, 20Lib, 16Fus, 1I	Carl Schurz (R)	Francis Preston Blair Jr. (D)	4R, 4D, 1LR	Grant/ Colfax (R) ✓
1872	B. Gratz Brown (LR)	Joseph J. Gravely (LR)	Eugene F. Weigel (D)	Andrew Jackson Baker (R)	Samuel Hays (R)	Daniel Draper (R)	19R, 14D, 1?	78D, 23R, 20Lib, 16Fus, 1I	Carl Schurz (R)	Francis Preston Blair Jr. (D)	4R, 4D, 1LR	Greeley/ Brown (LR) ✗
1873	Silas Woodson (D)	Charles Phillip Johnson (D)	Eugene F. Weigel (D)	Henry C. Ewing (D)	Harvey Wallis Salmon (D)	George B. Clark (D)	23D, 11R	94D, 37R	Carl Schurz (R)	Lewis V. Bogy (D)	9D, 4R	Greeley/ Brown (LR) ✗
1874	Silas Woodson (D)	Charles Phillip Johnson (D)	Eugene F. Weigel (D)	Henry C. Ewing (D)	Harvey Wallis Salmon (D)	George B. Clark (D)	23D, 11R	94D, 37R	Carl Schurz (R)	Lewis V. Bogy (D)	9D, 4R	Greeley/ Brown (LR) ✗
1875	Charles Henry Hardin (D)	Norman Jay Colman (D)	Michael K. McGrath (D)	John A. Hockaday (D)	Joseph Wayne Mercer (D)	Thomas Holloday (D)	28D, 6R	91D, 40R	Francis Cockrell (D)	Lewis V. Bogy (D)	13D	Greeley/ Brown (LR) ✗
1876	Charles Henry Hardin (D)	Norman Jay Colman (D)	Michael K. McGrath (D)	John A. Hockaday (D)	Joseph Wayne Mercer (D)	Thomas Holloday (D)	28D, 6R	91D, 40R	Francis Cockrell (D)	Lewis V. Bogy (D)	13D	Tilden/ Hendricks (D) ✗
1877	John S. Phelps (D)	Henry Clay Brockmeyer (D)	Michael K. McGrath (D)	Jackson L. Smith (D)	Elijah Gates (D)	Thomas Holloday (D)	28D, 6R	101D, 42R	Francis Cockrell (D)	Lewis V. Bogy (D)	9D, 4R	Tilden/ Hendricks (D) ✗
1877	John S. Phelps (D)	Henry Clay Brockmeyer (D)	Michael K. McGrath (D)	Jackson L. Smith (D)	Elijah Gates (D)	Thomas Holloday (D)	28D, 6R	101D, 42R	Francis Cockrell (D)	David H. Armstrong (D)	9D, 4R	Tilden/ Hendricks (D) ✗
1878	John S. Phelps (D)	Henry Clay Brockmeyer (D)	Michael K. McGrath (D)	Jackson L. Smith (D)	Elijah Gates (D)	Thomas Holloday (D)	28D, 6R	101D, 42R	Francis Cockrell (D)	David H. Armstrong (D)	9D, 4R	Tilden/ Hendricks (D) ✗
1879	John S. Phelps (D)	Henry Clay Brockmeyer (D)	Michael K. McGrath (D)	Jackson L. Smith (D)	Elijah Gates (D)	Thomas Holloday (D)	27D, 5R, 2GB	105D, 26GB, 11R, 1IR	Francis Cockrell (D)	James Shields (D)	12D, 1GB	Tilden/ Hendricks (D) ✗
1879	John S. Phelps (D)	Henry Clay Brockmeyer (D)	Michael K. McGrath (D)	Jackson L. Smith (D)	Elijah Gates (D)	Thomas Holloday (D)	27D, 5R, 2GB	105D, 26GB, 11R, 1IR	Francis Cockrell (D)	George Graham Vest (D)	12D, 1GB	Tilden/ Hendricks (D) ✗
1880	John S. Phelps (D)	Henry Clay Brockmeyer (D)	Michael K. McGrath (D)	Jackson L. Smith (D)	Elijah Gates (D)	Thomas Holloday (D)	27D, 5R, 2GB	105D, 26GB, 11R, 1IR	Francis Cockrell (D)	George Graham Vest (D)	12D, 1GB	Hancock/ English (D) ✗
1881	Thomas Theodore Crittenden (D)	Robert Alexander Campbell (D)	Michael K. McGrath (D)	Daniel H. McIntyre (D)	Phillip Edward Chappell (D)	John Walker (D)	25D, 7R, 2GB	98D, 42R, 3GB	Francis Cockrell (D)	George Graham Vest (D)	6D, 4GB, 3R	Hancock/ English (D) ✗
1882	Thomas Theodore Crittenden (D)	Robert Alexander Campbell (D)	Michael K. McGrath (D)	Daniel H. McIntyre (D)	Phillip Edward Chappell (D)	John Walker (D)	25D, 7R, 2GB	98D, 42R, 3GB	Francis Cockrell (D)	George Graham Vest (D)	6D, 4GB, 3R	Hancock/ English (D) ✗
1883	Thomas Theodore Crittenden (D)	Robert Alexander Campbell (D)	Michael K. McGrath (D)	Daniel H. McIntyre (D)	Phillip Edward Chappell (D)	John Walker (D)	28D, 6R	110D, 25R, 6GB, 1IR	Francis Cockrell (D)	George Graham Vest (D)	14D	Hancock/ English (D) ✗
1884	Thomas Theodore Crittenden (D)	Robert Alexander Campbell (D)	Michael K. McGrath (D)	Daniel H. McIntyre (D)	Phillip Edward Chappell (D)	John Walker (D)	28D, 6R	110D, 25R, 6GB, 1IR	Francis Cockrell (D)	George Graham Vest (D)	14D	Cleveland/ Hendricks (D) ✓
1885	John S. Marmaduke (D)	Albert P. Morehouse (D)	Michael K. McGrath (D)	Banton G. Boone (D)	James M. Seibert (D)	John Walker (D)	26D, 8R	100D, 40R	Francis Cockrell (D)	George Graham Vest (D)	12D, 2R	Cleveland/ Hendricks (D) ✓
1886	John S. Marmaduke (D)	Albert P. Morehouse (D)	Michael K. McGrath (D)	Banton G. Boone (D)	James M. Seibert (D)	John Walker (D)	26D, 8R	100D, 40R	Francis Cockrell (D)	George Graham Vest (D)	12D, 2R	Cleveland/ Hendricks (D) ✓
1887	John S. Marmaduke (D)	Albert P. Morehouse (D)	Michael K. McGrath (D)	Banton G. Boone (D)	James M. Seibert (D)	John Walker (D)	24D, 8R, 2GB	88D, 50R, 2UL	Francis Cockrell (D)	George Graham Vest (D)	12D, 2R	Cleveland/ Hendricks (D) ✓
1888	Albert P. Morehouse (D)	vacant	Michael K. McGrath (D)	Banton G. Boone (D)	James M. Seibert (D)	John Walker (D)	24D, 8R, 2GB	88D, 50R, 2UL	Francis Cockrell (D)	George Graham Vest (D)	12D, 2R	Cleveland/ Thurman (D) ✗
1889	David R. Francis (D)	Stephen Hugh Claycomb (D)	Alexander A. Lesueur (D)	John M. Wood (D)	Edward T. Noland (D)	James M. Seibert (D)	24D, 8R, 2UL	78D, 51R, 11Lab	Francis Cockrell (D)	George Graham Vest (D)	10D, 4R	Cleveland/ Thurman (D) ✗
1890	David R. Francis (D)	Stephen Hugh Claycomb (D)	Alexander A. Lesueur (D)	John M. Wood (D)	Lon Vest Stephens (D)	James M. Seibert (D)	24D, 8R, 2UL	78D, 51R, 11Lab	Francis Cockrell (D)	George Graham Vest (D)	10D, 4R	Cleveland/ Thurman (D) ✗
1891	David R. Francis (D)	Stephen Hugh Claycomb (D)	Alexander A. Lesueur (D)	John M. Wood (D)	Lon Vest Stephens (D)	James M. Seibert (D)	25D, 8R, 1UL	106D, 23R, 8FA, 1I, 2?	Francis Cockrell (D)	George Graham Vest (D)	14D	Cleveland/ Thurman (D) ✗
1892	David R. Francis (D)	Stephen Hugh Claycomb (D)	Alexander A. Lesueur (D)	John M. Wood (D)	Lon Vest Stephens (D)	James M. Seibert (D)	25D, 8R, 1UL	106D, 23R, 8FA, 1I, 2?	Francis Cockrell (D)	George Graham Vest (D)	14D	Cleveland/ Stevenson (D) ✓
1893	William J. Stone (D)	John Baptiste O'Meara (D)	Alexander A. Lesueur (D)	Robert F. Walker (D)	Lon Vest Stephens (D)	James M. Seibert (D)	28D, 6R	92D, 48R	Francis Cockrell (D)	George Graham Vest (D)	13D, 2R	Cleveland/ Stevenson (D) ✓
1894	William J. Stone (D)	John Baptiste O'Meara (D)	Alexander A. Lesueur (D)	Robert F. Walker (D)	Lon Vest Stephens (D)	James M. Seibert (D)	28D, 6R	92D, 48R	Francis Cockrell (D)	George Graham Vest (D)	14D, 1R	Cleveland/ Stevenson (D) ✓
1895	William J. Stone (D)	John Baptiste O'Meara (D)	Alexander A. Lesueur (D)	Robert F. Walker (D)	Lon Vest Stephens (D)	James M. Seibert (D)	19D, 15R	80R, 58D, 2Pop	Francis Cockrell (D)	George Graham Vest (D)	10R, 5D	Cleveland/ Stevenson (D) ✓
1896	William J. Stone (D)	John Baptiste O'Meara (D)	Alexander A. Lesueur (D)	Robert F. Walker (D)	Lon Vest Stephens (D)	James M. Seibert (D)	19D, 15R	80R, 58D, 2Pop	Francis Cockrell (D)	George Graham Vest (D)	11R, 4D	13 – Bryan/ Sewall (D) ✗ 4 – Bryan/ Watson (Pop) ✗
1897	Lon Vest Stephens (D)	August Bolte (D)	Alexander A. Lesueur (D)	Edward Coke Crow (D)	Frank L. Pitts (D)	James M. Seibert (D)	19D, 15R	79D, 47R, 14Pop	Francis Cockrell (D)	George Graham Vest (D)	12D, 3R	13 – Bryan/ Sewall (D) ✗ 4 – Bryan/ Watson (Pop) ✗
1898	Lon Vest Stephens (D)	August Bolte (D)	Alexander A. Lesueur (D)	Edward Coke Crow (D)	Frank L. Pitts (D)	James M. Seibert (D)	19D, 15R	79D, 47R, 14Pop	Francis Cockrell (D)	George Graham Vest (D)	12D, 3R	13 – Bryan/ Sewall (D) ✗ 4 – Bryan/ Watson (Pop) ✗
1899	Lon Vest Stephens (D)	August Bolte (D)	Alexander A. Lesueur (D)	Edward Coke Crow (D)	Frank L. Pitts (D)	James M. Seibert (D)	25D, 9R	80D, 58R, 2Pop	Francis Cockrell (D)	George Graham Vest (D)	12D, 3R	13 – Bryan/ Sewall (D) ✗ 4 – Bryan/ Watson (Pop) ✗
1900	Lon Vest Stephens (D)	August Bolte (D)	Alexander A. Lesueur (D)	Edward Coke Crow (D)	Frank L. Pitts (D)	James M. Seibert (D)	25D, 9R	80D, 58R, 2Pop	Francis Cockrell (D)	George Graham Vest (D)	12D, 3R	Bryan/ Stevenson ✗
1901	Alexander M. Dockery (D)	John Adams Lee (D)	Sam B. Cook (D)	Edward Coke Crow (D)	Robert P. Williams (D)	Albert O. Allen (D)	25D, 9R	88D, 51R, 1Pop	Francis Cockrell (D)	George Graham Vest (D)	13D, 2R	Bryan/ Stevenson ✗
1902	Alexander M. Dockery (D)	John Adams Lee (D)	Sam B. Cook (D)	Edward Coke Crow (D)	Robert P. Williams (D)	Albert O. Allen (D)	25D, 9R	88D, 51R, 1Pop	Francis Cockrell (D)	George Graham Vest (D)	13D, 2R	Bryan/ Stevenson ✗
1903	Alexander M. Dockery (D)	John Adams Lee (D)	Sam B. Cook (D)	Edward Coke Crow (D)	Robert P. Williams (D)	Albert O. Allen (D)	26D, 8R	82D, 60R	Francis Cockrell (D)	William J. Stone (D)	12D, 3R (Note: Republican George Chester Robinson Wagoner successfully contested James Joseph Butler's election and served the final week of his term.)	Bryan/ Stevenson ✗
1903	Alexander M. Dockery (D)	Thomas L. Rubey (D)	Sam B. Cook (D)	Edward Coke Crow (D)	Robert P. Williams (D)	Albert O. Allen (D)	26D, 8R	82D, 60R	Francis Cockrell (D)	William J. Stone (D)	15D, 1R	Bryan/ Stevenson ✗
1904	Alexander M. Dockery (D)	Thomas L. Rubey (D)	Sam B. Cook (D)	Edward Coke Crow (D)	Robert P. Williams (D)	Albert O. Allen (D)	26D, 8R	82D, 60R	Francis Cockrell (D)	William J. Stone (D)	15D, 1R	Roosevelt/ Fairbanks (R) ✓
1905	Joseph W. Folk (D)	John C. McKinley (R)	John E. Swanger (R)	Herbert S. Hadley (R)	Jacob F. Gmelich (R)	William W. Wilder (R)	24D, 10R	82R, 60D	William Warner (R)	William J. Stone (D)	9R, 7D	Roosevelt/ Fairbanks (R) ✓
1906	Joseph W. Folk (D)	John C. McKinley (R)	John E. Swanger (R)	Herbert S. Hadley (R)	Jacob F. Gmelich (R)	William W. Wilder (R)	24D, 10R	82R, 60D	William Warner (R)	William J. Stone (D)	9R, 7D	Roosevelt/ Fairbanks (R) ✓
1906	Joseph W. Folk (D)	John C. McKinley (R)	John E. Swanger (R)	Herbert S. Hadley (R)	Jacob F. Gmelich (R)	William W. Wilder (R)	24D, 10R	82R, 60D	William Warner (R)	William J. Stone (D)	10R, 6D (Note: Republican Harry M. Coudrey successfully challenged the election of Ernest E. Wood and served the remainder of his term.)	Roosevelt/ Fairbanks (R) ✓
1907	Joseph W. Folk (D)	John C. McKinley (R)	John E. Swanger (R)	Herbert S. Hadley (R)	Jacob F. Gmelich (R)	William W. Wilder (R)	23D, 11R	84D, 58R	William Warner (R)	William J. Stone (D)	12D, 4R	Roosevelt/ Fairbanks (R) ✓
1908	Joseph W. Folk (D)	John C. McKinley (R)	John E. Swanger (R)	Herbert S. Hadley (R)	Jacob F. Gmelich (R)	William W. Wilder (R)	23D, 11R	84D, 58R	William Warner (R)	William J. Stone (D)	12D, 4R	Taft/ Sherman (R) ✓
1909	Herbert S. Hadley (R)	Jacob F. Gmelich (R)	Cornelius Roach (D)	Elliott Woolfolk Major (D)	James Cowgill (D)	John P. Gordon (D)	23D, 11R	73R, 69D	William Warner (R)	William J. Stone (D)	10D, 6R	Taft/ Sherman (R) ✓
1910	Herbert S. Hadley (R)	Jacob F. Gmelich (R)	Cornelius Roach (D)	Elliott Woolfolk Major (D)	James Cowgill (D)	John P. Gordon (D)	23D, 11R	73R, 69D	William Warner (R)	William J. Stone (D)	10D, 6R	Taft/ Sherman (R) ✓
1911	Herbert S. Hadley (R)	Jacob F. Gmelich (R)	Cornelius Roach (D)	Elliott Woolfolk Major (D)	James Cowgill (D)	John P. Gordon (D)	22D, 12R	82D, 60R	James A. Reed (D)	William J. Stone (D)	14D, 2R (Note: A third seated Republican Theron E. Catlin's election was successfully contested by Democrat Patrick F. Gill.)	Taft/ Sherman (R) ✓
1912	Herbert S. Hadley (R)	Jacob F. Gmelich (R)	Cornelius Roach (D)	Elliott Woolfolk Major (D)	James Cowgill (D)	John P. Gordon (D)	22D, 12R	82D, 60R	James A. Reed (D)	William J. Stone (D)	14D, 2R	Wilson/ Marshall (D) ✓
1913	Elliott Woolfolk Major (D)	William Rock Painter (D)	Cornelius Roach (D)	John T. Barker (D)	Edwin P. Deal (D)	John P. Gordon (D)	25D, 9R	113D, 28R, 1Prog	James A. Reed (D)	William J. Stone (D)	15D, 1R	Wilson/ Marshall (D) ✓
1914	Elliott Woolfolk Major (D)	William Rock Painter (D)	Cornelius Roach (D)	John T. Barker (D)	Edwin P. Deal (D)	John P. Gordon (D)	25D, 9R	113D, 28R, 1Prog	James A. Reed (D)	William J. Stone (D)	15D, 1R	Wilson/ Marshall (D) ✓
1915	Elliott Woolfolk Major (D)	William Rock Painter (D)	Cornelius Roach (D)	John T. Barker (D)	Edwin P. Deal (D)	John P. Gordon (D)	26D, 8R	76D, 65R, 1Prog	James A. Reed (D)	William J. Stone (D)	14D, 2R	Wilson/ Marshall (D) ✓
1916	Elliott Woolfolk Major (D)	William Rock Painter (D)	Cornelius Roach (D)	John T. Barker (D)	Edwin P. Deal (D)	John P. Gordon (D)	26D, 8R	76D, 65R, 1Prog	James A. Reed (D)	William J. Stone (D)	14D, 2R	Wilson/ Marshall (D) ✓
1917	Frederick D. Gardner (D)	Wallace Crossley (D)	John L. Sullivan (D)	Frank W. McAllister (D)	George H. Middelkamp (D)	George E. Hackman (R)	26D, 8R	78D, 64R	James A. Reed (D)	William J. Stone (D)	14D, 2R	Wilson/ Marshall (D) ✓
1918	Frederick D. Gardner (D)	Wallace Crossley (D)	John L. Sullivan (D)	Frank W. McAllister (D)	George H. Middelkamp (D)	George E. Hackman (R)	26D, 8R	78D, 64R	James A. Reed (D)	William J. Stone (D)	14D, 2R	Wilson/ Marshall (D) ✓
1918	Frederick D. Gardner (D)	Wallace Crossley (D)	John L. Sullivan (D)	Frank W. McAllister (D)	George H. Middelkamp (D)	George E. Hackman (R)	26D, 8R	78D, 64R	James A. Reed (D)	Xenophon P. Wilfley (D)	14D, 2R	Wilson/ Marshall (D) ✓
1919	Frederick D. Gardner (D)	Wallace Crossley (D)	John L. Sullivan (D)	Frank W. McAllister (D)	George H. Middelkamp (D)	George E. Hackman (R)	22D, 12R	75R, 67D	James A. Reed (D)	Selden P. Spencer (R)	11D, 5R	Wilson/ Marshall (D) ✓
1920	Frederick D. Gardner (D)	Wallace Crossley (D)	John L. Sullivan (D)	Frank W. McAllister (D)	George H. Middelkamp (D)	George E. Hackman (R)	22D, 12R	75R, 67D	James A. Reed (D)	Selden P. Spencer (R)	11D, 5R	Harding/ Coolidge (R) ✓
1921	Arthur M. Hyde (R)	Hiram Lloyd (R)	Charles U. Becker (R)	Jesse W. Barrett (R)	Lorenzo Dow Thompson (R)	George E. Hackman (R)	19R, 15D	104R, 38D	James A. Reed (D)	Selden P. Spencer (R)	14R, 2D	Harding/ Coolidge (R) ✓
1922	Arthur M. Hyde (R)	Hiram Lloyd (R)	Charles U. Becker (R)	Jesse W. Barrett (R)	Lorenzo Dow Thompson (R)	George E. Hackman (R)	19R, 15D	104R, 38D	James A. Reed (D)	Selden P. Spencer (R)	14R, 2D	Harding/ Coolidge (R) ✓
1923	Arthur M. Hyde (R)	Hiram Lloyd (R)	Charles U. Becker (R)	Jesse W. Barrett (R)	Lorenzo Dow Thompson (R)	George E. Hackman (R)	19D, 15R	83D, 67R	James A. Reed (D)	Selden P. Spencer (R)	11D, 5R	Harding/ Coolidge (R) ✓
1924	Arthur M. Hyde (R)	Hiram Lloyd (R)	Charles U. Becker (R)	Jesse W. Barrett (R)	Lorenzo Dow Thompson (R)	George E. Hackman (R)	19D, 15R	83D, 67R	James A. Reed (D)	Selden P. Spencer (R)	11D, 5R	Coolidge/ Dawes (R) ✓
1925	Sam Aaron Baker (R)	Philip A. Bennett (R)	Charles U. Becker (R)	Robert W. Otto (R)	C. Eugene Stephens (R)	Lorenzo Dow Thompson (R)	22D, 12R	78R, 72D	James A. Reed (D)	Selden P. Spencer (R)	9D, 7R	Coolidge/ Dawes (R) ✓
1925	Sam Aaron Baker (R)	Philip A. Bennett (R)	Charles U. Becker (R)	North Todd Gentry (R)	C. Eugene Stephens (R)	Lorenzo Dow Thompson (R)	22D, 12R	78R, 72D	James A. Reed (D)	George H. Williams (R)	9D, 7R	Coolidge/ Dawes (R) ✓
1926	Sam Aaron Baker (R)	Philip A. Bennett (R)	Charles U. Becker (R)	North Todd Gentry (R)	C. Eugene Stephens (R)	Lorenzo Dow Thompson (R)	22D, 12R	78R, 72D	James A. Reed (D)	George H. Williams (R)	9D, 7R	Coolidge/ Dawes (R) ✓
1927	Sam Aaron Baker (R)	Philip A. Bennett (R)	Charles U. Becker (R)	North Todd Gentry (R)	C. Eugene Stephens (R)	Lorenzo Dow Thompson (R)	21D, 13R	79R, 71D	James A. Reed (D)	Harry B. Hawes (R)	12D, 4R	Coolidge/ Dawes (R) ✓
1928	Sam Aaron Baker (R)	Philip A. Bennett (R)	Charles U. Becker (R)	North Todd Gentry (R)	C. Eugene Stephens (R)	Lorenzo Dow Thompson (R)	21D, 13R	79R, 71D	James A. Reed (D)	Harry B. Hawes (R)	12D, 4R	Hoover/ Curtis (R) ✓
1929	Henry S. Caulfield (R)	Edward Henry Winter (R)	Charles U. Becker (R)	Stratton Shartel (R)	Larry Brunk (R)	Lorenzo Dow Thompson (R)	19D, 15R	103R, 47D	Roscoe C. Patterson (R)	Harry B. Hawes (R)	10R, 6D	Hoover/ Curtis (R) ✓
1930	Henry S. Caulfield (R)	Edward Henry Winter (R)	Charles U. Becker (R)	Stratton Shartel (R)	Larry Brunk (R)	Lorenzo Dow Thompson (R)	19D, 15R	103R, 47D	Roscoe C. Patterson (R)	Harry B. Hawes (R)	10R, 6D	Hoover/ Curtis (R) ✓
1931	Henry S. Caulfield (R)	Edward Henry Winter (R)	Charles U. Becker (R)	Stratton Shartel (R)	Larry Brunk (R)	Lorenzo Dow Thompson (R)	19D, 15R	86D, 64R	Roscoe C. Patterson (R)	Harry B. Hawes (R)	10D, 6R	Hoover/ Curtis (R) ✓
1932	Henry S. Caulfield (R)	Edward Henry Winter (R)	Charles U. Becker (R)	Stratton Shartel (R)	Larry Brunk (R)	Lorenzo Dow Thompson (R)	19D, 15R	86D, 64R	Roscoe C. Patterson (R)	Harry B. Hawes (R)	10D, 6R	Roosevelt/ Garner (D) ✓
1933	Guy Brasfield Park (D)	Frank Gaines Harris (D)	Dwight H. Brown (D)	Roy McKittrick (D)	Richard R. Nacy (D)	Forrest Smith (D)	27D, 7R	140D, 10R	Roscoe C. Patterson (R)	Bennett Champ Clark (D)	13D	Roosevelt/ Garner (D) ✓
1934	Guy Brasfield Park (D)	Frank Gaines Harris (D)	Dwight H. Brown (D)	Roy McKittrick (D)	Richard R. Nacy (D)	Forrest Smith (D)	27D, 7R	140D, 10R	Roscoe C. Patterson (R)	Bennett Champ Clark (D)	13D	Roosevelt/ Garner (D) ✓
1935	Guy Brasfield Park (D)	Frank Gaines Harris (D)	Dwight H. Brown (D)	Roy McKittrick (D)	Richard R. Nacy (D)	Forrest Smith (D)	32D, 2R	102D, 48R	Harry S. Truman (D)	Bennett Champ Clark (D)	12D, 1R	Roosevelt/ Garner (D) ✓
1936	Guy Brasfield Park (D)	Frank Gaines Harris (D)	Dwight H. Brown (D)	Roy McKittrick (D)	Richard R. Nacy (D)	Forrest Smith (D)	32D, 2R	102D, 48R	Harry S. Truman (D)	Bennett Champ Clark (D)	12D, 1R	Roosevelt/ Garner (D) ✓
1937	Lloyd C. Stark (D)	Frank Gaines Harris (D)	Dwight H. Brown (D)	Roy McKittrick (D)	Robert W. Winn (D)	Forrest Smith (D)	31D, 3R	105D, 45R	Harry S. Truman (D)	Bennett Champ Clark (D)	12D, 1R	Roosevelt/ Garner (D) ✓
1938	Lloyd C. Stark (D)	Frank Gaines Harris (D)	Dwight H. Brown (D)	Roy McKittrick (D)	Robert W. Winn (D)	Forrest Smith (D)	31D, 3R	105D, 45R	Harry S. Truman (D)	Bennett Champ Clark (D)	12D, 1R	Roosevelt/ Garner (D) ✓
1939	Lloyd C. Stark (D)	Frank Gaines Harris (D)	Dwight H. Brown (D)	Roy McKittrick (D)	Robert W. Winn (D)	Forrest Smith (D)	31D, 3R	98D, 52R	Harry S. Truman (D)	Bennett Champ Clark (D)	12D, 1R	Roosevelt/ Garner (D) ✓
1940	Lloyd C. Stark (D)	Frank Gaines Harris (D)	Dwight H. Brown (D)	Roy McKittrick (D)	Robert W. Winn (D)	Forrest Smith (D)	31D, 3R	98D, 52R	Harry S. Truman (D)	Bennett Champ Clark (D)	12D, 1R	Roosevelt/ Wallace (D) ✓
1941	Forrest C. Donnell (R)	Frank Gaines Harris (D)	Dwight H. Brown (D)	Roy McKittrick (D)	Wilson Bell (D)	Forrest Smith (D)	29D, 5R	85D, 65R	Harry S. Truman (D)	Bennett Champ Clark (D)	10D, 3R	Roosevelt/ Wallace (D) ✓
1942	Forrest C. Donnell (R)	Frank Gaines Harris (D)	Dwight H. Brown (D)	Roy McKittrick (D)	Wilson Bell (D)	Forrest Smith (D)	29D, 5R	85D, 65R	Harry S. Truman (D)	Bennett Champ Clark (D)	10D, 3R	Roosevelt/ Wallace (D) ✓
1943	Forrest C. Donnell (R)	Frank Gaines Harris (D)	Dwight H. Brown (D)	Roy McKittrick (D)	Wilson Bell (D)	Forrest Smith (D)	17D, 17R	95R, 55D	Harry S. Truman (D)	Bennett Champ Clark (D)	8R, 5D	Roosevelt/ Wallace (D) ✓
1944	Forrest C. Donnell (R)	Frank Gaines Harris (D)	Gregory C. Stockard (R)	Roy McKittrick (D)	Wilson Bell (D)	Forrest Smith (D)	17D, 17R	95R, 55D	Harry S. Truman (D)	Bennett Champ Clark (D)	8R, 5D	Roosevelt/ Truman (D) ✓
1945	Phil M. Donnelly (D)	Walter Naylor Davis (D)	Wilson Bell (D)	Buck Taylor (D)	Robert W. Winn (D)	Forrest Smith (D)	19R, 15D	80R, 70D	Frank P. Briggs (D) (Note: Appointed to office.)	Forrest C. Donnell (R)	7D, 6R	Roosevelt/ Truman (D) ✓
1946	Phil M. Donnelly (D)	Walter Naylor Davis (D)	Wilson Bell (D)	Buck Taylor (D)	Robert W. Winn (D)	Forrest Smith (D)	19R, 15D	80R, 70D	Frank P. Briggs (D)	Forrest C. Donnell (R)	7D, 6R	Roosevelt/ Truman (D) ✓
1947	Phil M. Donnelly (D)	Walter Naylor Davis (D)	Edgar C. Nelson (D)	Buck Taylor (D)	Robert W. Winn (D)	Forrest Smith (D)	19R, 15D	100R, 54D	James P. Kem (R)	Forrest C. Donnell (R)	9R, 3D	Roosevelt/ Truman (D) ✓
1948	Phil M. Donnelly (D)	Walter Naylor Davis (D)	Edgar C. Nelson (D)	Buck Taylor (D)	Robert W. Winn (D)	Forrest Smith (D)	19R, 15D	100R, 54D	James P. Kem (R)	Forrest C. Donnell (R)	9R, 3D	Truman/ Barkley (D) ✓
1948	Phil M. Donnelly (D)	Walter Naylor Davis (D)	Edgar C. Nelson (D)	Buck Taylor (D)	Richard R. Nacy (D)	Forrest Smith (D)	19R, 15D	100R, 54D	James P. Kem (R)	Forrest C. Donnell (R)	9R, 3D	Truman/ Barkley (D) ✓
1949	Forrest Smith (D)	James T. Blair Jr. (D)	Walter H. Toberman (D)	Buck Taylor (D)	Mount Etna Morris (D)	W. H. Holmes (D) (Note: Died in office.)	19D, 15R	99D, 55R	James P. Kem (R)	Forrest C. Donnell (R)	12D, 1R	Truman/ Barkley (D) ✓
1950	Forrest Smith (D)	James T. Blair Jr. (D)	Walter H. Toberman (D)	Buck Taylor (D)	Mount Etna Morris (D)	W. H. Holmes (D)	19D, 15R	99D, 55R	James P. Kem (R)	Forrest C. Donnell (R)	12D, 1R	Truman/ Barkley (D) ✓
1951	Forrest Smith (D)	James T. Blair Jr. (D)	Walter H. Toberman (D)	Buck Taylor (D)	Mount Etna Morris (D)	W. H. Holmes (D)	21D, 13R	85D, 69R	James P. Kem (R)	Thomas C. Hennings Jr. (D) (Note: Died in office.)	9D, 4R	Truman/ Barkley (D) ✓
1952	Forrest Smith (D)	James T. Blair Jr. (D)	Walter H. Toberman (D)	Buck Taylor (D)	Mount Etna Morris (D)	W. H. Holmes (D)	21D, 13R	85D, 69R	James P. Kem (R)	Thomas C. Hennings Jr. (D)	9D, 4R	Eisenhower/ Nixon ✓
1953	Phil M. Donnelly (D)	James T. Blair Jr. (D)	Walter H. Toberman (D)	John M. Dalton (D)	George Hubert Bates (D)	Haskell Holman (D)	18D, 16R	85R, 72D	Stuart Symington (D)	Thomas C. Hennings Jr. (D)	7D, 4R	Eisenhower/ Nixon ✓
1954	Phil M. Donnelly (D)	James T. Blair Jr. (D)	Walter H. Toberman (D)	John M. Dalton (D)	George Hubert Bates (D)	Haskell Holman (D)	18D, 16R	85R, 72D	Stuart Symington (D)	Thomas C. Hennings Jr. (D)	7D, 4R	Eisenhower/ Nixon ✓
1955	Phil M. Donnelly (D)	James T. Blair Jr. (D)	Walter H. Toberman (D)	John M. Dalton (D)	George Hubert Bates (D)	Haskell Holman (D)	19D, 15R	97D, 60R	Stuart Symington (D)	Thomas C. Hennings Jr. (D)	9D, 2R	Eisenhower/ Nixon ✓
1956	Phil M. Donnelly (D)	James T. Blair Jr. (D)	Walter H. Toberman (D)	John M. Dalton (D)	George Hubert Bates (D)	Haskell Holman (D)	19D, 15R	97D, 60R	Stuart Symington (D)	Thomas C. Hennings Jr. (D)	9D, 2R	Stevenson/ Kefauver ✗
1957	James T. Blair Jr. (D)	Edward V. Long (D)	Walter H. Toberman (D)	John M. Dalton (D)	Mount Etna Morris (D)	Haskell Holman (D)	21D, 13R	93D, 64R	Stuart Symington (D)	Thomas C. Hennings Jr. (D)	10D, 1R	Stevenson/ Kefauver ✗
1958	James T. Blair Jr. (D)	Edward V. Long (D)	Walter H. Toberman (D)	John M. Dalton (D)	Mount Etna Morris (D)	Haskell Holman (D)	21D, 13R	93D, 64R	Stuart Symington (D)	Thomas C. Hennings Jr. (D)	10D, 1R	Stevenson/ Kefauver ✗
1959	James T. Blair Jr. (D)	Edward V. Long (D)	Walter H. Toberman (D)	John M. Dalton (D)	Mount Etna Morris (D)	Haskell Holman (D)	26D, 8R	112D, 45R	Stuart Symington (D)	Thomas C. Hennings Jr. (D)	10D, 1R	Stevenson/ Kefauver ✗
1960	James T. Blair Jr. (D)	Edward V. Long (D)	Robert W. Crawford (D)	John M. Dalton (D)	Mount Etna Morris (D)	Haskell Holman (D)	26D, 8R	112D, 45R	Stuart Symington (D)	Thomas C. Hennings Jr. (D)	10D, 1R	Kennedy/ Johnson ✓
1961	John M. Dalton (D)	Hilary A. Bush (D)	Warren E. Hearnes (D)	Thomas Eagleton (D)	Milton Carpenter (D)	Haskell Holman (D)	28D, 6R	100D, 57R	Stuart Symington (D)	Edward V. Long (D)	9D, 2R	Kennedy/ Johnson ✓
1962	John M. Dalton (D)	Hilary A. Bush (D)	Warren E. Hearnes (D)	Thomas Eagleton (D)	Milton Carpenter (D)	Haskell Holman (D)	28D, 6R	100D, 57R	Stuart Symington (D)	Edward V. Long (D)	9D, 2R	Kennedy/ Johnson ✓
1963	John M. Dalton (D)	Hilary A. Bush (D)	Warren E. Hearnes (D)	Thomas Eagleton (D)	Milton Carpenter (D)	Haskell Holman (D)	23D, 11R	101D, 62R	Stuart Symington (D)	Edward V. Long (D)	8D, 2R	Kennedy/ Johnson ✓
1964	John M. Dalton (D)	Hilary A. Bush (D)	Warren E. Hearnes (D)	Thomas Eagleton (D)	Milton Carpenter (D)	Haskell Holman (D)	23D, 11R	101D, 62R	Stuart Symington (D)	Edward V. Long (D)	8D, 2R	Johnson/ Humphrey ✓
1965	Warren E. Hearnes (D)	Thomas Eagleton (D)	James Kirkpatrick (D)	Norman H. Anderson (D)	Mount Etna Morris (D)	Haskell Holman (D)	23D, 11R	124D, 39R	Stuart Symington (D)	Edward V. Long (D)	8D, 2R	Johnson/ Humphrey ✓
1966	Warren E. Hearnes (D)	Thomas Eagleton (D)	James Kirkpatrick (D)	Norman H. Anderson (D)	Mount Etna Morris (D)	Haskell Holman (D)	23D, 11R	124D, 39R	Stuart Symington (D)	Edward V. Long (D)	8D, 2R	Johnson/ Humphrey ✓
1967	Warren E. Hearnes (D)	Thomas Eagleton (D)	James Kirkpatrick (D)	Norman H. Anderson (D)	Mount Etna Morris (D)	Haskell Holman (D)	23D, 11R	107D, 56R	Stuart Symington (D)	Edward V. Long (D)	8D, 2R	Johnson/ Humphrey ✓
1968	Warren E. Hearnes (D)	Thomas Eagleton (D)	James Kirkpatrick (D)	Norman H. Anderson (D)	Mount Etna Morris (D)	Haskell Holman (D)	23D, 11R	107D, 56R	Stuart Symington (D)	Edward V. Long (D)	8D, 2R	Nixon/ Agnew (R) ✓
1969	Warren E. Hearnes (D)	William S. Morris (D)	James Kirkpatrick (D)	John Danforth (R)	William Edmond Robinson (D)	Haskell Holman (D)	23D, 11R	109D, 54R	Stuart Symington (D)	Thomas Eagleton (D)	9D, 1R	Nixon/ Agnew (R) ✓
1970	Warren E. Hearnes (D)	William S. Morris (D)	James Kirkpatrick (D)	John Danforth (R)	William Edmond Robinson (D)	Haskell Holman (D)	23D, 11R	109D, 54R	Stuart Symington (D)	Thomas Eagleton (D)	9D, 1R	Nixon/ Agnew (R) ✓
1971	Warren E. Hearnes (D)	William S. Morris (D)	James Kirkpatrick (D)	John Danforth (R)	William Edmond Robinson (D)	Kit Bond (R)	25D, 9R	112D, 51R	Stuart Symington (D)	Thomas Eagleton (D)	9D, 1R	Nixon/ Agnew (R) ✓
1972	Warren E. Hearnes (D)	William S. Morris (D)	James Kirkpatrick (D)	John Danforth (R)	William Edmond Robinson (D)	Kit Bond (R)	25D, 9R	112D, 51R	Stuart Symington (D)	Thomas Eagleton (D)	9D, 1R	Nixon/ Agnew (R) ✓
1973	Kit Bond (R)	Bill Phelps (R)	James Kirkpatrick (D)	John Danforth (R)	Jim Spainhower (D)	John Ashcroft (R)	23D, 11R	97D, 66R	Stuart Symington (D)	Thomas Eagleton (D)	9D, 1R	Nixon/ Agnew (R) ✓
1974	Kit Bond (R)	Bill Phelps (R)	James Kirkpatrick (D)	John Danforth (R)	Jim Spainhower (D)	John Ashcroft (R)	23D, 11R	97D, 66R	Stuart Symington (D)	Thomas Eagleton (D)	9D, 1R	Nixon/ Agnew (R) ✓
1975	Kit Bond (R)	Bill Phelps (R)	James Kirkpatrick (D)	John Danforth (R)	Jim Spainhower (D)	George W. Lehr (D) (Note: Resigned from office.)	23D, 11R	113D, 50R	Stuart Symington (D)	Thomas Eagleton (D)	8D, 2R	Nixon/ Agnew (R) ✓
1976	Kit Bond (R)	Bill Phelps (R)	James Kirkpatrick (D)	John Danforth (R)	Jim Spainhower (D)	George W. Lehr (D)	23D, 11R	113D, 50R	Stuart Symington (D)	Thomas Eagleton (D)	8D, 2R	Carter/ Mondale (D) ✓
1977	Joseph P. Teasdale (D)	Bill Phelps (R)	James Kirkpatrick (D)	John Ashcroft (R)	Jim Spainhower (D)	Thomas M. Keyes (D)	24D, 10R	111D, 52R	John Danforth (R)	Thomas Eagleton (D)	8D, 2R	Carter/ Mondale (D) ✓
1978	Joseph P. Teasdale (D)	Bill Phelps (R)	James Kirkpatrick (D)	John Ashcroft (R)	Jim Spainhower (D)	James Antonio (R)	24D, 10R	111D, 52R	John Danforth (R)	Thomas Eagleton (D)	8D, 2R	Carter/ Mondale (D) ✓
1979	Joseph P. Teasdale (D)	Bill Phelps (R)	James Kirkpatrick (D)	John Ashcroft (R)	Jim Spainhower (D)	James Antonio (R)	23D, 11R	116D, 47R	John Danforth (R)	Thomas Eagleton (D)	8D, 2R	Carter/ Mondale (D) ✓
1980	Joseph P. Teasdale (D)	Bill Phelps (R)	James Kirkpatrick (D)	John Ashcroft (R)	Jim Spainhower (D)	James Antonio (R)	23D, 11R	116D, 47R	John Danforth (R)	Thomas Eagleton (D)	8D, 2R	Reagan/ Bush (R) ✓
1981	Kit Bond (R)	Ken Rothman (D)	James Kirkpatrick (D)	John Ashcroft (R)	Mel Carnahan (D)	James Antonio (R)	24D, 10R	111D, 52R	John Danforth (R)	Thomas Eagleton (D)	6D, 4R	Reagan/ Bush (R) ✓
1982	Kit Bond (R)	Ken Rothman (D)	James Kirkpatrick (D)	John Ashcroft (R)	Mel Carnahan (D)	James Antonio (R)	24D, 10R	111D, 52R	John Danforth (R)	Thomas Eagleton (D)	6D, 4R	Reagan/ Bush (R) ✓
1983	Kit Bond (R)	Ken Rothman (D)	James Kirkpatrick (D)	John Ashcroft (R)	Mel Carnahan (D)	James Antonio (R)	22D, 12R	110D, 53R	John Danforth (R)	Thomas Eagleton (D)	6D, 3R	Reagan/ Bush (R) ✓
1984	Kit Bond (R)	Ken Rothman (D)	James Kirkpatrick (D)	John Ashcroft (R)	Mel Carnahan (D)	James Antonio (R)	22D, 12R	110D, 53R	John Danforth (R)	Thomas Eagleton (D)	6D, 3R	Reagan/ Bush (R) ✓
1984	Kit Bond (R)	Ken Rothman (D)	James Kirkpatrick (D)	John Ashcroft (R)	Mel Carnahan (D)	Margaret B. Kelly (R) (Note: Appointed by Gov. Bond; elected in 1986.)	22D, 12R	110D, 53R	John Danforth (R)	Thomas Eagleton (D)	6D, 3R	Reagan/ Bush (R) ✓
1985	John Ashcroft (R)	Harriett Woods (D)	Roy Blunt (R)	William L. Webster (R)	Wendell Bailey (R)	Margaret B. Kelly (R)	21D, 13R	108D, 55R	John Danforth (R)	Thomas Eagleton (D)	6D, 3R	Reagan/ Bush (R) ✓
1986	John Ashcroft (R)	Harriett Woods (D)	Roy Blunt (R)	William L. Webster (R)	Wendell Bailey (R)	Margaret B. Kelly (R)	21D, 13R	108D, 55R	John Danforth (R)	Thomas Eagleton (D)	6D, 3R	Reagan/ Bush (R) ✓
1987	John Ashcroft (R)	Harriett Woods (D)	Roy Blunt (R)	William L. Webster (R)	Wendell Bailey (R)	Margaret B. Kelly (R)	21D, 13R	111D, 52R	John Danforth (R)	Kit Bond (R)	5D, 4R	Reagan/ Bush (R) ✓
1988	John Ashcroft (R)	Harriett Woods (D)	Roy Blunt (R)	William L. Webster (R)	Wendell Bailey (R)	Margaret B. Kelly (R)	21D, 13R	111D, 52R	John Danforth (R)	Kit Bond (R)	5D, 4R	Bush/ Quayle (R) ✓
1989	John Ashcroft (R)	Mel Carnahan (D)	Roy Blunt (R)	William L. Webster (R)	Wendell Bailey (R)	Margaret B. Kelly (R)	22D, 12R	104D, 59R	John Danforth (R)	Kit Bond (R)	5D, 4R	Bush/ Quayle (R) ✓
1990	John Ashcroft (R)	Mel Carnahan (D)	Roy Blunt (R)	William L. Webster (R)	Wendell Bailey (R)	Margaret B. Kelly (R)	22D, 12R	104D, 59R	John Danforth (R)	Kit Bond (R)	5D, 4R	Bush/ Quayle (R) ✓
1991	John Ashcroft (R)	Mel Carnahan (D)	Roy Blunt (R)	William L. Webster (R)	Wendell Bailey (R)	Margaret B. Kelly (R)	23D, 11R	98D, 65R	John Danforth (R)	Kit Bond (R)	6D, 3R	Bush/ Quayle (R) ✓
1992	John Ashcroft (R)	Mel Carnahan (D)	Roy Blunt (R)	William L. Webster (R)	Wendell Bailey (R)	Margaret B. Kelly (R)	23D, 11R	98D, 65R	John Danforth (R)	Kit Bond (R)	6D, 3R	Clinton/ Gore (D) ✓
1993	Mel Carnahan (D)	Roger B. Wilson (D)	Judith Moriarty (D) (Note: Impeached and removed from office.)	Jay Nixon (D)	Bob Holden (D)	Margaret B. Kelly (R)	20D, 14R	100D, 63R	John Danforth (R)	Kit Bond (R)	6D, 3R	Clinton/ Gore (D) ✓
1994	Mel Carnahan (D)	Roger B. Wilson (D)	Judith Moriarty (D)	Jay Nixon (D)	Bob Holden (D)	Margaret B. Kelly (R)	20D, 14R	100D, 63R	John Danforth (R)	Kit Bond (R)	6D, 3R	Clinton/ Gore (D) ✓
1994	Mel Carnahan (D)	Roger B. Wilson (D)	Richard Hanson (D)	Jay Nixon (D)	Bob Holden (D)	Margaret B. Kelly (R)	20D, 14R	100D, 63R	John Danforth (R)	Kit Bond (R)	6D, 3R	Clinton/ Gore (D) ✓
1995	Mel Carnahan (D)	Roger B. Wilson (D)	Bekki Cook (D) (Note: Appointed by Gov. Carnahan.)	Jay Nixon (D)	Bob Holden (D)	Margaret B. Kelly (R)	19D, 15R	87D, 76R	John Ashcroft (R)	Kit Bond (R)	6D, 3R	Clinton/ Gore (D) ✓
1996	Mel Carnahan (D)	Roger B. Wilson (D)	Bekki Cook (D)	Jay Nixon (D)	Bob Holden (D)	Margaret B. Kelly (R)	19D, 15R	87D, 76R	John Ashcroft (R)	Kit Bond (R)	6D, 3R	Clinton/ Gore (D) ✓
1997	Mel Carnahan (D)	Roger B. Wilson (D)	Bekki Cook (D)	Jay Nixon (D)	Bob Holden (D)	Margaret B. Kelly (R)	19D, 15R	88D, 75R	John Ashcroft (R)	Kit Bond (R)	5D, 4R	Clinton/ Gore (D) ✓
1998	Mel Carnahan (D)	Roger B. Wilson (D)	Bekki Cook (D)	Jay Nixon (D)	Bob Holden (D)	Margaret B. Kelly (R)	19D, 15R	88D, 75R	John Ashcroft (R)	Kit Bond (R)	5D, 4R	Clinton/ Gore (D) ✓
1999	Mel Carnahan (D)	Roger B. Wilson (D)	Bekki Cook (D)	Jay Nixon (D)	Bob Holden (D)	Claire McCaskill (D)	18D, 16R	85D, 78R	John Ashcroft (R)	Kit Bond (R)	5D, 4R	Clinton/ Gore (D) ✓
2000	Mel Carnahan (D)	Roger B. Wilson (D)	Bekki Cook (D)	Jay Nixon (D)	Bob Holden (D)	Claire McCaskill (D)	18D, 16R	85D, 78R	John Ashcroft (R)	Kit Bond (R)	5D, 4R	Bush/ Cheney (R) ✓
2000	Roger B. Wilson (D)	Joe Maxwell (D)	Bekki Cook (D)	Jay Nixon (D)	Bob Holden (D)	Claire McCaskill (D)	18D, 16R	85D, 78R	John Ashcroft (R)	Kit Bond (R)	5D, 4R	Bush/ Cheney (R) ✓
2001	Bob Holden (D)	Joe Maxwell (D)	Matt Blunt (R)	Jay Nixon (D)	Nancy Farmer (D)	Claire McCaskill (D)	18R, 16D	87D, 76R	Jean Carnahan (D) (Note: Appointed to fill seat won by her deceased husband, November 2000.)	Kit Bond (R)	5R, 4D	Bush/ Cheney (R) ✓
2002	Bob Holden (D)	Joe Maxwell (D)	Matt Blunt (R)	Jay Nixon (D)	Nancy Farmer (D)	Claire McCaskill (D)	18R, 16D	87D, 76R	Jean Carnahan (D)	Kit Bond (R)	5R, 4D	Bush/ Cheney (R) ✓
2002	Bob Holden (D)	Joe Maxwell (D)	Matt Blunt (R)	Jay Nixon (D)	Nancy Farmer (D)	Claire McCaskill (D)	18R, 16D	87D, 76R	Jim Talent (R) (Note: Elected in special election, November 2002.)	Kit Bond (R)	5R, 4D	Bush/ Cheney (R) ✓
2003	Bob Holden (D)	Joe Maxwell (D)	Matt Blunt (R)	Jay Nixon (D)	Nancy Farmer (D)	Claire McCaskill (D)	20R, 14D	90R, 73D	Jim Talent (R)	Kit Bond (R)	5R, 4D	Bush/ Cheney (R) ✓
2004	Bob Holden (D)	Joe Maxwell (D)	Matt Blunt (R)	Jay Nixon (D)	Nancy Farmer (D)	Claire McCaskill (D)	20R, 14D	90R, 73D	Jim Talent (R)	Kit Bond (R)	5R, 4D	Bush/ Cheney (R) ✓
2005	Matt Blunt (R)	Peter Kinder (R)	Robin Carnahan (D)	Jay Nixon (D)	Sarah Steelman (R)	Claire McCaskill (D)	23R, 11D	97R, 66D	Jim Talent (R)	Kit Bond (R)	5R, 4D	Bush/ Cheney (R) ✓
2006	Matt Blunt (R)	Peter Kinder (R)	Robin Carnahan (D)	Jay Nixon (D)	Sarah Steelman (R)	Claire McCaskill (D)	23R, 11D	97R, 66D	Jim Talent (R)	Kit Bond (R)	5R, 4D	Bush/ Cheney (R) ✓
2007	Matt Blunt (R)	Peter Kinder (R)	Robin Carnahan (D)	Jay Nixon (D)	Sarah Steelman (R)	Susan Montee (D)	21R, 13D	92R, 71D	Claire McCaskill (D)	Kit Bond (R)	5R, 4D	Bush/ Cheney (R) ✓
2008	Matt Blunt (R)	Peter Kinder (R)	Robin Carnahan (D)	Jay Nixon (D)	Sarah Steelman (R)	Susan Montee (D)	21R, 13D	92R, 71D	Claire McCaskill (D)	Kit Bond (R)	5R, 4D	McCain/ Palin (R) ✗
2009	Jay Nixon (D)	Peter Kinder (R)	Robin Carnahan (D)	Chris Koster (D)	Clint Zweifel (D)	Susan Montee (D)	23R, 11D	89R, 74D	Claire McCaskill (D)	Kit Bond (R)	5R, 4D	McCain/ Palin (R) ✗
2010	Jay Nixon (D)	Peter Kinder (R)	Robin Carnahan (D)	Chris Koster (D)	Clint Zweifel (D)	Susan Montee (D)	23R, 11D	89R, 74D	Claire McCaskill (D)	Kit Bond (R)	5R, 4D	McCain/ Palin (R) ✗
2011	Jay Nixon (D)	Peter Kinder (R)	Robin Carnahan (D)	Chris Koster (D)	Clint Zweifel (D)	Tom Schweich (R)	26R, 8D	106R, 57D	Claire McCaskill (D)	Roy Blunt (R)	6R, 3D	McCain/ Palin (R) ✗
2012	Jay Nixon (D)	Peter Kinder (R)	Robin Carnahan (D)	Chris Koster (D)	Clint Zweifel (D)	Tom Schweich (R)	26R, 8D	106R, 56D, 1I	Claire McCaskill (D)	Roy Blunt (R)	6R, 3D	Romney/ Ryan (R) ✗
2013	Jay Nixon (D)	Peter Kinder (R)	Jason Kander (D)	Chris Koster (D)	Clint Zweifel (D)	Tom Schweich (R)	24R, 10D	110R, 53D	Claire McCaskill (D)	Roy Blunt (R)	6R, 2D	Romney/ Ryan (R) ✗
2014	Jay Nixon (D)	Peter Kinder (R)	Jason Kander (D)	Chris Koster (D)	Clint Zweifel (D)	Tom Schweich (R)	24R, 10D	110R, 53D	Claire McCaskill (D)	Roy Blunt (R)	6R, 2D	Romney/ Ryan (R) ✗
2015	Jay Nixon (D)	Peter Kinder (R)	Jason Kander (D)	Chris Koster (D)	Clint Zweifel (D)	Nicole Galloway (D) (Note: Appointed as replacement in April 2015.)	25R, 9D	117R, 45D, 1I	Claire McCaskill (D)	Roy Blunt (R)	6R, 2D	Romney/ Ryan (R) ✗
2016	Jay Nixon (D)	Peter Kinder (R)	Jason Kander (D)	Chris Koster (D)	Clint Zweifel (D)	Nicole Galloway (D)	25R, 9D	117R, 45D, 1I	Claire McCaskill (D)	Roy Blunt (R)	6R, 2D	Trump/ Pence (R) ✓
2017	Eric Greitens (R)	Mike Parson (R)	Jay Ashcroft (R)	Josh Hawley (R)	Eric Schmitt (R)	Nicole Galloway (D)	25R, 9D	117R, 46D	Claire McCaskill (D)	Roy Blunt (R)	6R, 2D	Trump/ Pence (R) ✓
2018	Eric Greitens (R)	Mike Parson (R)	Jay Ashcroft (R)	Josh Hawley (R)	Eric Schmitt (R)	Nicole Galloway (D)	24R, 10D	117R, 46D	Claire McCaskill (D)	Roy Blunt (R)	6R, 2D	Trump/ Pence (R) ✓
2018	Mike Parson (R)	Mike Kehoe (R)	Jay Ashcroft (R)	Josh Hawley (R)	Eric Schmitt (R)	Nicole Galloway (D)	24R, 10D	117R, 46D	Claire McCaskill (D)	Roy Blunt (R)	6R, 2D	Trump/ Pence (R) ✓
2019	Mike Parson (R)	Mike Kehoe (R)	Jay Ashcroft (R)	Eric Schmitt (R)	Scott Fitzpatrick (R)	Nicole Galloway (D)	24R, 10D	116R, 47D	Josh Hawley (R)	Roy Blunt (R)	6R, 2D	Trump/ Pence (R) ✓
2020	Mike Parson (R)	Mike Kehoe (R)	Jay Ashcroft (R)	Eric Schmitt (R)	Scott Fitzpatrick (R)	Nicole Galloway (D)	24R, 10D	116R, 47D	Josh Hawley (R)	Roy Blunt (R)	6R, 2D	Trump/ Pence (R) ✗
2021	Mike Parson (R)	Mike Kehoe (R)	Jay Ashcroft (R)	Eric Schmitt (R)	Scott Fitzpatrick (R)	Nicole Galloway (D)	24R, 10D	114R, 49D	Josh Hawley (R)	Roy Blunt (R)	6R, 2D	Trump/ Pence (R) ✗
2022	Mike Parson (R)	Mike Kehoe (R)	Jay Ashcroft (R)	Eric Schmitt (R)	Scott Fitzpatrick (R)	Nicole Galloway (D)	24R, 10D	114R, 49D	Josh Hawley (R)	Roy Blunt (R)	6R, 2D	Trump/ Pence (R) ✗
2023	Mike Parson (R)	Mike Kehoe (R)	Jay Ashcroft (R)	Andrew Bailey (R)	Vivek Malek (R)	Scott Fitzpatrick (R)	24R, 10D	111R, 52D	Josh Hawley (R)	Eric Schmitt (R)	6R, 2D	Trump/ Pence (R) ✗
2024	Mike Parson (R)	Mike Kehoe (R)	Jay Ashcroft (R)	Andrew Bailey (R)	Vivek Malek (R)	Scott Fitzpatrick (R)	24R, 10D	111R, 52D	Josh Hawley (R)	Eric Schmitt (R)	6R, 2D	Trump/ Vance (R) ✓
2025	Mike Kehoe (R)	David Wasinger (R)	Denny Hoskins (R)	Andrew Bailey (R)	Vivek Malek (R)	Scott Fitzpatrick (R)	24R, 10D	111R, 52D	Josh Hawley (R)	Eric Schmitt (R)	6R, 2D	Trump/ Vance (R) ✓
2026	Mike Kehoe (R)	David Wasinger (R)	Denny Hoskins (R)	Catherine Hanaway (R)	Vivek Malek (R)	Scott Fitzpatrick (R)	24R, 10D	111R, 52D	Josh Hawley (R)	Eric Schmitt (R)	6R, 2D	Trump/ Vance (R) ✓
2027	Mike Kehoe (R)	David Wasinger (R)	Denny Hoskins (R)	Catherine Hanaway (R)	Vivek Malek (R)	Scott Fitzpatrick (R)	22R, 12D	95R, 68D	Josh Hawley (R)	Eric Schmitt (R)	5R, 3D	Trump/ Vance (R) ✓

Key to party colors and abbreviations for members of the U.S. Congress and other politicians or officials
Alaskan Independence (AKIP) Know Nothing (KN) American Labor (AL) Anti-Jacksonian (Anti-J); National Republican (NR) Anti-Administration (AA) Anti-Masonic (Anti-M) Conservative (Con) Covenant (Cov)	Democratic (D) Democratic–Farmer–Labor (DFL) Democratic–NPL (D-NPL) Dixiecrat (Dix), States' Rights (SR) Democratic-Republican (DR) Farmer–Labor (FL) Federalist (F); Pro-Administration (PA)	Free Soil (FS) Fusion (Fus) Greenback (GB) Independence (IPM) Jacksonian (J) Liberal (Lib) Libertarian (L) National Union (NU)	Nonpartisan League (NPL) Nullifier (N) Opposition Northern (O); Opposition Southern (O) Populist (Pop) Progressive (Prog) Prohibition (Proh) Readjuster (Rea)	Republican (R) Silver (Sv) Silver Republican (SvR) Socialist (Soc) Union (U) Unconditional Union (UU) Vermont Progressive (VP) Whig (W)	Independent (I) Nonpartisan (NP)

== See also ==
- Law and government in Missouri
- Elections in Missouri
