= 1880 Missouri State Treasurer election =

State officeholder election in Missouri, USA

- November 2, 1880
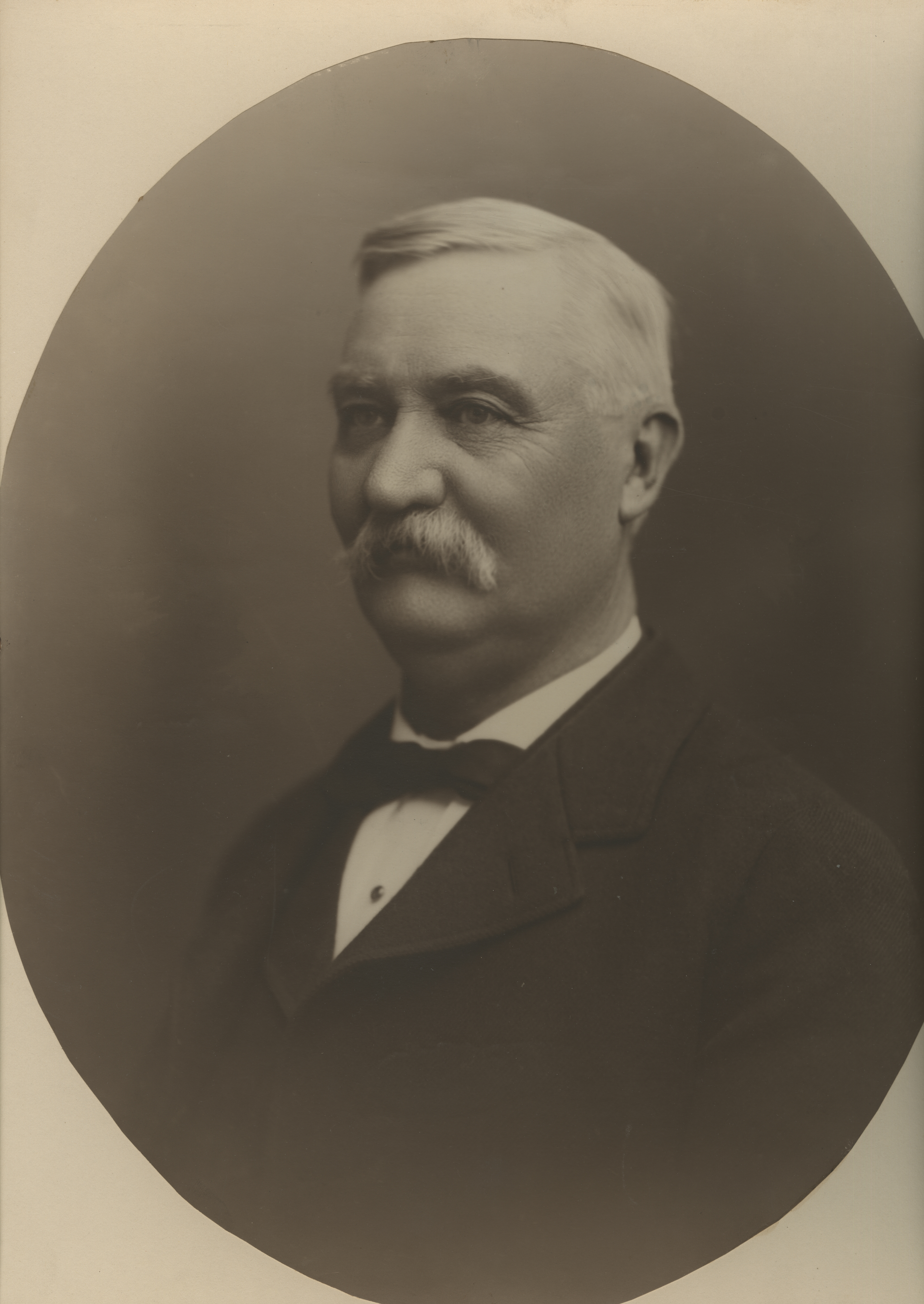

Nominee	Phillip Edward Chappell	W. Q. Dallmyer
Party	Democratic	Republican
Popular vote	208,323	153,488
Percentage	52.63%	38.78%
State Treasurer before election
Elijah Gates
Democratic
Elected State Treasurer
Phillip Edward Chappell
Democratic

The 1880 Missouri State Treasurer election was held on November 2, 1880, in order to elect the state treasurer of Missouri. Democratic nominee Phillip Edward Chappell defeated Republican nominee W. Q. Dallmyer, Greenback nominee John M. Snead and Independent candidate W. M. Lowry.

== General election ==
On election day, November 2, 1880, Democratic nominee Phillip Edward Chappell won the election by a margin of 54,835 votes against his foremost opponent Republican nominee W. Q. Dallmyer, thereby retaining Democratic control over the office of state treasurer. Chappell was sworn in as the 15th state treasurer of Missouri on January 10, 1881.

=== Results ===
Missouri State Treasurer election, 1880
Party	Candidate	Votes	%
Democratic	Phillip Edward Chappell	208,323	52.63
Republican	W. Q. Dallmyer	153,488	38.78
Greenback	John M. Snead	18,268	4.62
Independent	W. M. Lowry	15,757	3.97
Total votes		395,836	100.00
Democratic hold			

== See also ==
- 1880 Missouri gubernatorial election
