= 1874 Missouri State Treasurer election =

- November 3, 1874
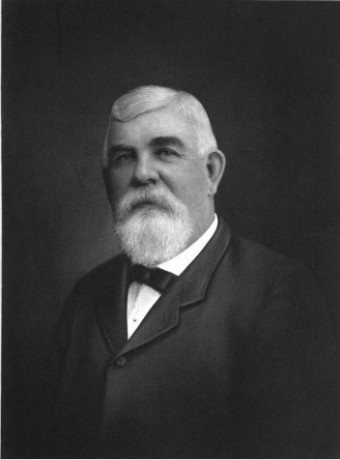

Nominee	Joseph Wayne Mercer	John H. Fisse
Party	Democratic	Populist
Popular vote	150,584	110,293
Percentage	57.72%	42.28%
State Treasurer before election
Harvey Wallis Salmon
Democratic
Elected State Treasurer
Joseph Wayne Mercer
Democratic

The 1874 Missouri State Treasurer election was held on November 3, 1874, in order to elect the state treasurer of Missouri. Democratic nominee Joseph Wayne Mercer defeated People's nominee John H. Fisse.

== General election ==
On election day, November 3, 1874, Democratic nominee Joseph Wayne Mercer won the election by a margin of 40,291 votes against his opponent People's nominee John H. Fisse, thereby retaining Democratic control over the office of state treasurer. Mercer was sworn in as the 13th state treasurer of Missouri on January 11, 1875.

=== Results ===
Missouri State Treasurer election, 1874
Party	Candidate	Votes	%
Democratic	Joseph Wayne Mercer	150,584	57.72
Populist	William R. Leflet	110,293	42.28
Total votes		260,877	100.00
Democratic hold			

== See also ==
- 1874 Missouri gubernatorial election
