= Aaron Crossley =

American politician

Member of the Missouri House of Representatives from the 29th district
- In office January 4, 2023 – August 31, 2026
- Preceded by: Rory Rowland
- Succeeded by: Tedi Rowland (elect)

Personal details
- Born: Independence, Missouri, U.S.
- Party: Democratic
- Education: Appalachian Bible College
- Alma mater: University of Missouri
- Website: https://www.aaroncrossley.com/

Aaron Crossley is an American politician who served as a Democratic member of the Missouri House of Representatives, representing the state's 29th House district.

== Early life ==
Crossley was born in Independence, Missouri.

== Education ==
Crossley holds degrees from Appalachian Bible College and the University of Missouri-Kansas City.

== Career ==
Crossley is a Licensed Master Social Worker (LMSW).

Crossley was elected to the Missouri House of Representatives in the 2022 election. He supports the state increasing the number of child abuse investigators. He resigned from the chamber in August 2026.

== Personal life ==
Crossley and his wife have two children.
