= List of mayors of Independence, Missouri =

Independence, Missouri mayors

This a list of mayors of the city of Independence, Missouri, United States of America:

- William McCoy, 1849
- J.R. Palmer, 1850
- Porter McClanahan, 1851, 1873
- Jess Henry, 1851
- Abraham Comingo, 1852, 1857
- A.E. Tyree, 1853
- Thomas J. Shaw, 1854
- Geo. R. Hotsenpiller, 1855–1856, 1859–1860, 1862, 1864
- W.L. Bone, 1858
- John K. Stark, 1861
- William Peacock, 1865
- Peter Kinters, 1866–1867
- J.H. Slover, 1868, 1870
- B.F. Wallace, 1869
- V.M. Hobbs, 1871–1872
- Robert Weston, 1874
- John W. Perry, 1875–76
- E.A. Hickman, 1877
- Horace Sheley, 1878
- W.A. Cunningham, 1879
- O.H. Mitchell, 1880–1881
- James Peacock, 1882–1884
- Thomas C. Caldwell, 1885–1888
- William S. Flournoy, 1889
- Cornell Crysler, 1890–1891
- Joseph Wayne Mercer, 1892–1893
- Persifor H. Grinter, 1894–1895, 1904–1905
- Alden C. Millard, 1896–1897
- Samuel H. Woodson, 1898–1901
- Reese W. McCurdy, 1902–1903
- James Allen Prewitt, 1906–1907
- Llewellyn Jones, 1908–1911
- Christian Ott, 1912–1920
- Wm. Stewart McCoy, 1920–1921
- Charles D. Capelle, 1922–1923
- Roger T. Sermon, 1924–1950
- Renick Jones, 1950
- Robert P. Weatherford, Jr., 1950–1958
- William Sermon, 1958–1961
- Arch G. Campbell, 1961–1962
- L. F. P. Curry, 1962–1966
- Donald L. Slusher, 1966–1970
- Phil K. Weeks, 1970–1974
- Richard A. King, 1974–1978
- E. Lee Comer, Jr., 1978–1982
- Barbara J. Potts, 1982–1990
- William (Bill) Carpenter, 1990–1994
- Rondell Stewart, 1994–2006
- Don B. Reimal, 2006–2014
- Eileen Weir, 2014–2022
- Rory Rowland, 2022–2026
- Kevin King since 2026

== See also ==
- Independence history
