= John Peter Didier =

American politician (1753–1823)

State Treasurer of Missouri
- In office 1820 – August 1821
- Preceded by: Office established
- Succeeded by: Nathaniel Simonds

Personal details
- Born: 1753 Gézier-et-Fontenelay
- Died: August 25, 1823 (aged 69–70)

John Peter Didier (1753 – August 25, 1823) was an American politician. He served as the first State Treasurer of Missouri, from 1820 to 1821.

== Biography ==
Didier was born in 1753, in Gézier-et-Fontenelay. He married Marie Elizabeth Mercier on November 15, 1773. Later moving to Missouri, the St. Louis Board of Trustees selected him fire captain of the city in 1811. He served as treasurer of the Missouri Territory from 1817 to 1818, then served as State Treasurer of Missouri from August 1820 to 1821. He was affiliated with no political party, as for all politicians in Missouri at the time, and was selected to become treasurer for his abilities. Though, it is believed that Didier received the position due to his political influence. He resigned as treasurer in 1821, which is what all political officials did when the Constitution of Missouri went into effect. He died on August 25, 1823, aged 69 or 70.

Political offices
Preceded by Office established	Missouri State Treasurer; 1820–1821	Succeeded by Nathaniel Simonds
