= Rory Rowland =

American politician

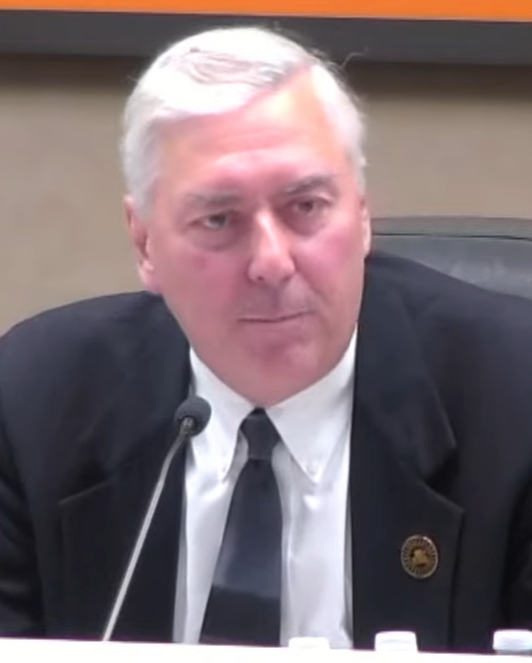

51st Mayor of Independence
- In office April 17, 2022 – April 20, 2026
- Preceded by: Eileen Weir
- Succeeded by: Kevin King

Member of the Missouri House of Representatives from the 29th district
- In office January 6, 2016 – April 17, 2022
- Succeeded by: Aaron Crossley

Personal details
- Party: Democratic
- Spouse: Tedi
- Children: 4

Rory Rowland is an American politician. He was a member of the Missouri House of Representatives, representing the 29th district from 2016 to 2022. He is a member of the Democratic Party. Rowland was elected as mayor of Independence, Missouri in April 2022.

== Electoral history ==
=== State representative ===
Missouri House of Representatives Special Election, November 3, 2015, District 29
| Party | Candidate | Votes | % | ±% |
|---|---|---|---|---|
| Democratic | Rory Rowland | 2,144 | 58.26% | +19.29 |
| Republican | Brian DeMoss | 1,340 | 36.41% | −24.62 |
| Constitution | Richard W. McKie | 196 | 5.33% | +5.33 |

Missouri House of Representatives Election, November 8, 2016, District 29
| Party | Candidate | Votes | % | ±% |
|---|---|---|---|---|
| Democratic | Rory Rowland | 12,530 | 100.00% | +41.74 |

Missouri House of Representatives Election, November 6, 2018, District 29
| Party | Candidate | Votes | % | ±% |
|---|---|---|---|---|
| Democratic | Rory Rowland | 10,512 | 100.00% | |

=== Mayor ===
2022 Independence, Missouri mayoral election
| Party | Candidate | Votes | % |
|---|---|---|---|
| Democratic | Rory Rowland | 5,956 | 58.12% |
| Write-in | Mike Steinmeyer | 2,813 | 27.45% |
| Democratic | Eileen Weir (incumbent) | 1,479 | 14.43% |

== See also ==
- List of mayors of Independence, Missouri
