= Tedi Rowland =

American politician

Member-elect of the Missouri House of Representatives from the 29th district
- Assuming office January 2027
- Succeeding: Aaron Crossley

Personal details
- Party: Democratic

Tedi Rowland is an American politician. A member of the Democratic Party, she is the member-elect for the 29th district of the Missouri House of Representatives.
