= William Q. Dallmeyer =

American politician (1829–1908)

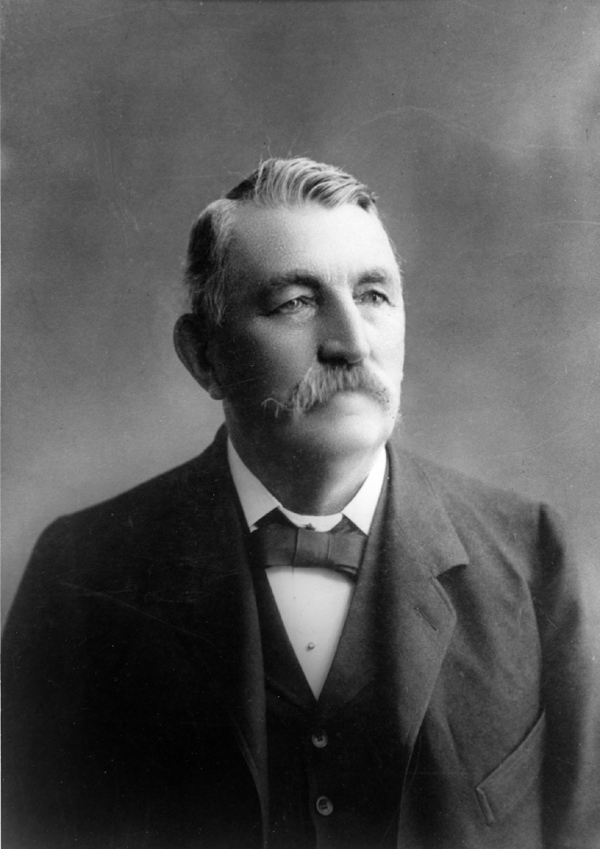

Treasurer of Missouri
- In office 1869–1871
- Preceded by: William Bishop
- Succeeded by: Samuel Hays

Member of the Missouri General Assembly
- In office 1864 – 1868

Personal details
- Born: William Quintilis Dallmeyer; October 23, 1829 Hanover, German Confederation
- Died: March 10, 1908 (aged 78)
- Party: Republican

William Quintilis Dallmeyer (October 23, 1829 – March 15, 1908) was an American politician. He served as State Treasurer of Missouri from 1869 to 1871.

== Biography ==
Dallmeyer was born on October 23, 1829, in Dissen, Kingdom of Hanover. Having immigrated to the United States in 1845, he was a resident of New York City, New Orleans, St. Louis. He then moved to Gasconade County, Missouri in 1856, where he worked as a storeowner and farmer, as well as the county's justice of the peace and postmaster. A Unionist, he served in the Home Guard during the American Civil War. He was ranked lieutenant colonel and commanded a battalion.

A Republican, Dallmeyer was a member of the Missouri General Assembly, serving from 1864, to in or before November 1868, as then, he was appointed State Treasurer of Missouri. He served as Treasurer from 1869 to 1871, and earned $3,000 per year in the position.

Dallmeyer lived in Jefferson City, moving there amidst his tenure as Treasurer. Between 1874 and 1882, he was a teller for the First National Bank. He then cofounded the Exchange Bank, which he became president of in 1907, following the death of Henry Clay Ewing. For eighteen years he served as treasurer of the Jefferson City School Board. In 1875, he married Sophia Lang, with whom he had five children. He died on March 15, 1908, aged 78. His house, which he purchased in 1869, was damaged by a tornado on May 22, 2019, then demolished in December. He oversaw the addition of a second floor, but its Neoclassical renovation was instated after his death.

Political offices
Preceded by William Bishop	Missouri State Treasurer; 1869–1871	Succeeded by Samuel Hays
