= James Earickson =

American politician (1782–1844)

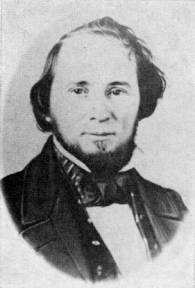

State Treasurer of Missouri
- In office January 1, 1829 – December 1833
- Preceded by: Nathaniel Simonds
- Succeeded by: John Walker

Member of the Missouri Senate
- In office August 1828 – January 1, 1829

Personal details
- Born: December 7, 1782 Kent Island, Maryland, US
- Died: June 11, 1844 (aged 61) Howard County, Missouri, US
- Party: Democratic
- Relations: David R. Francis (grandson-in-law)

James Earickson (December 7, 1782 – June 11, 1844) was an American politician. He served as the State Treasurer of Missouri from 1829 to 1833.

== Biography ==
Earickson was born on December 7, 1782, on Kent Island, Maryland, moving to near Glasgow, Missouri – prior to its incorporation – in 1818. He moved onto a farm in Howard County in 1828, on a larger property; his house was presumably the first brick house in the county. When Glasgow was platted, parts of the town was planned atop land sold to them by Earickson.

A Democrat, Earickson was elected to the Missouri Senate in August 1828. He was appointed State Treasurer of Missouri on January 1, 1829, after which he moved into a log house in Jefferson City. He earned $730 per year as treasurer. The treasury room of the Missouri State Capitol at the time was a small room with iron windows, and the state funds were stored in a barrel constructed of iron; the fund was counted in Mexican silver dollars at the time. After his tenure ended in December 1833, he returned to his Howard County farm. He owned slaves. He later served as a judge, and in the 1830s, he presided over the case of George M. Hinkle and other Mormon leaders. By his decision, Mormons were exiled from Howard County.

Earickson had a wife, Rebecca Malone, with whom he had three children. He died on June 11, 1844, aged 61, in Howard County. His granddaughter, Jane Perry, was the wife of Governor David R. Francis.

Political offices
Preceded by Nathaniel Simonds	Missouri State Treasurer; 1829–1833	Succeeded by John Walker
