= Samuel Hays (Missouri politician) =

American politician (c.1830s–1897)

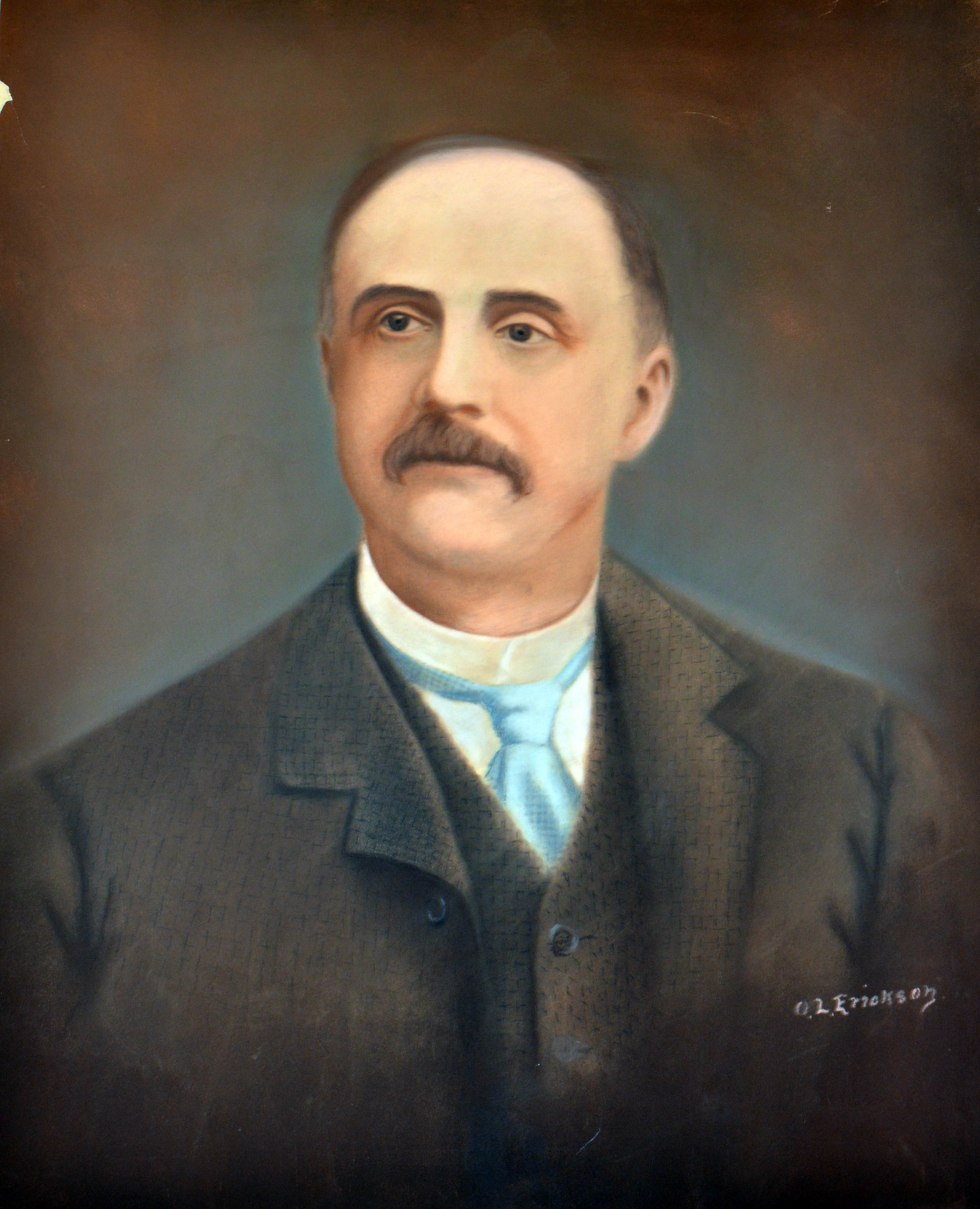

11th State Treasurer of Missouri
- In office 1871–1873
- Governor: Joseph W. McClurg
- Preceded by: William Q. Dallmeyer
- Succeeded by: Harvey Wallis Salmon

Member of the Missouri House of Representatives from the 1st district
- In office 1868

Personal details
- Born: c. 1830 – c. 1835 Philadelphia, Pennsylvania, US
- Died: October 8, 1897 (aged 66–67) Upper Montclair, New Jersey, US
- Party: Republican
- Children: 3
- Occupation: Politician

Samuel Hays (c. 1830 – c. 1835 – October 8, 1897) was an American politician. He served as the State Treasurer of Missouri from 1871 to 1873.

== Biography ==
Hays was born c. 1830 – c. 1835, in Philadelphia, to Robert and Mary Hays (née Dudgeon). Following the American Civil War, he practiced medicine in Memphis, Tennessee, later practicing in St. Joseph, Missouri. In St. Joseph, he also operated a hardware store and headed the St. Louis and St. Joseph Railroad.

A Republican, Hays served in the Missouri House of Representatives from the 1st district, in 1868. He served as State Treasurer of Missouri from 1871 to 1873, for which he was paid $3,000 per year, as well as $1,500 per year to cover contingent expenses. During his tenure, he purchased a new vault door for the Missouri treasury, costing $2,100. In 1878, an audit failed to account for $1,000, which led to Hays being investigated.

After leaving office, he relocated to St. Louis. Rutherford B. Hayes appointed him postmaster of the city, a position which he served from 1878 to 1884. At times, he was president of the Atlantic and Pacific Railroad and the St. Louis–San Francisco Railway. He was called "one of the most widely known men in St. Louis". He moved to New York City in 1885, where he worked as an immigration agent, appointed by Benjamin Harrison. He was married to Sarah Elizabeth Morris and had three children. He died on October 8, 1897, aged 61 or 62, or aged 66 or 67, in Upper Montclair, New Jersey.

Political offices
Preceded by William Q. Dallmeyer	State Treasurer of Missouri; 1871–1873	Succeeded by Harvey Wallis Salmon
