= Bakerville, Missouri =

Unincorporated community in Missouri, U.S.

Coordinates: 36°14′02″N 89°55′04″W

Bakerville is an unincorporated community in Pemiscot County, in the U.S. state of Missouri.

== History ==
Bakerville (also spelled Bakersville) was originally called Hillsman Taylor, and under the latter name was laid out in 1930, and named after Hillsman Taylor, an insurance executive. The present name, adopted in 1935, honors one Mr. Baker, a local farm supervisor.
