= Nathaniel Simonds =

American politician (1775–1850)

2nd State Treasurer of Missouri
- In office September 1821 – 1829
- Preceded by: John Peter Didier
- Succeeded by: James Earickson

Personal details
- Born: 1775 Windsor, Vermont, US
- Died: April 20, 1850 (aged 74–75) Troy, Missouri, US
- Party: Democratic-Republican

Nathaniel Simonds (1775 – April 20, 1850) was an American politician. He served as State Treasurer of Missouri from 1821 to 1829.

== Biography ==
Simonds was born in 1775, in Windsor, Vermont. He later moved to St. Charles, Missouri in February 1801, living on property gained from a Spanish grant. He served as St. Charles County Sheriff and also owned a tavern, the city's mail coach, and a hotel.

A Democratic-Republican, Simonds was appointed as the second State Treasurer of Missouri, in September 1821. He was paid an annual $730, in quarterly installments. He retired as state treasurer in 1829, after which he settled in Lincoln County. He died on April 20, 1850, aged 74 or 75, in Troy.

Political offices
Preceded by John Peter Didier	Missouri State Treasurer; 1821–1829	Succeeded by James Earickson
