= Phillip Edward Chappell =

American politician (1837–1908)

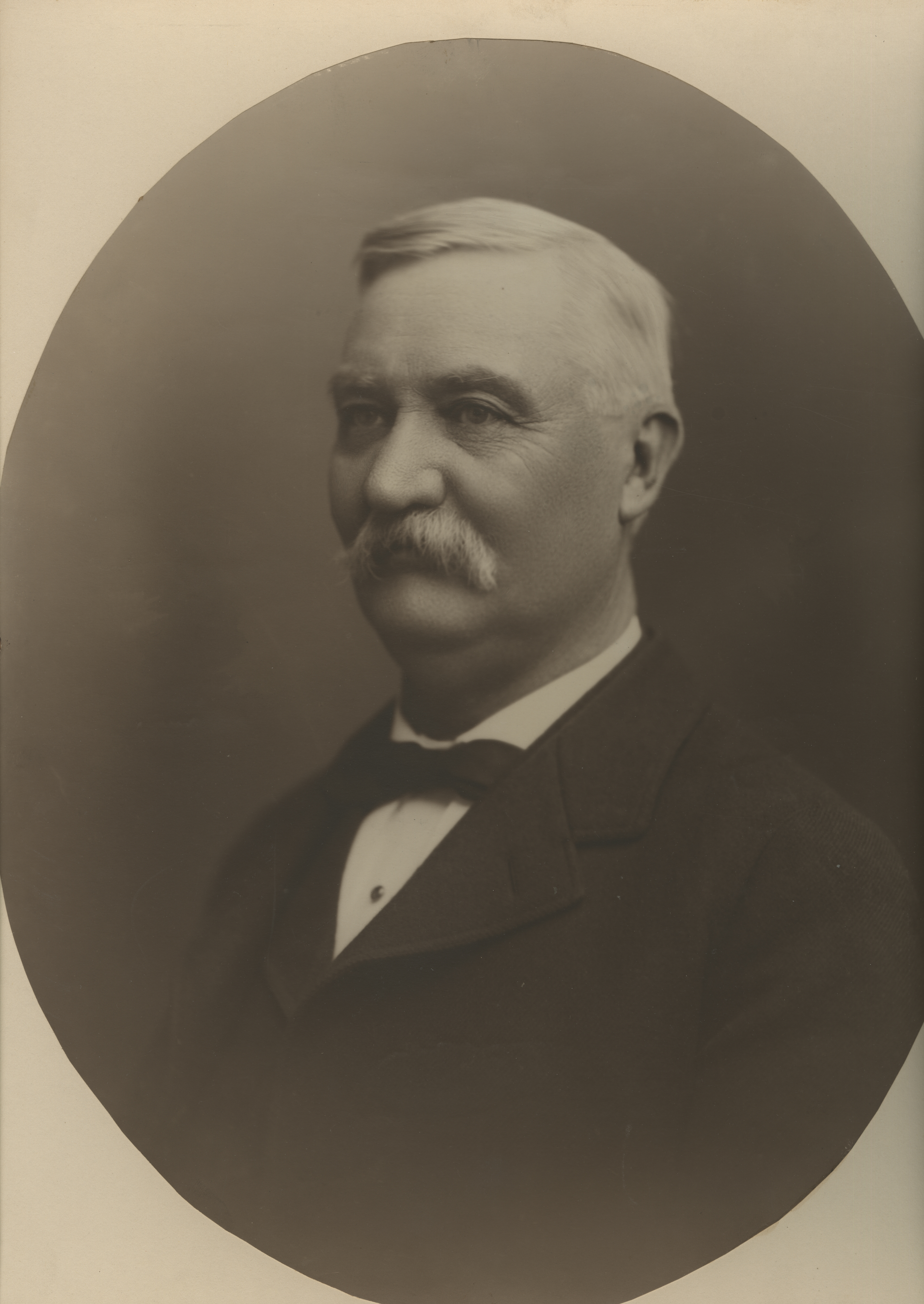

15th State Treasurer of Missouri
- In office 1881–1885
- Governor: Thomas Theodore Crittenden
- Preceding: Elijah Gates
- Preceded by: James M. Seibert

Mayor of Jefferson City, Missouri
- In office 1872–?

Personal details
- Born: August 18, 1837 Bakerville, Missouri, US
- Died: February 23, 1908 (aged 70) Jefferson City, Missouri, US
- Party: Democratic
- Education: Kemper Military School; University of Missouri

Phillip Edward Chappell (August 18, 1837 – February 23, 1908) was an American politician. He served as the State Treasurer of Missouri from 1881 to 1885.

== Biography ==
Chappell was born on August 18, 1837, near Bakerville, Missouri. His parents were tobacco farmers John and Mary Chappell (née Adams). He worked at a general store at age 15. He attended Kemper Military School from 1853 to 1856, then the University of Missouri. He witnessed the explosion of Steamer Timour No. 2 in 1854.

Chappell was a clerk on Steamer E.A. Ogden from 1855 to February 22, 1860, his position ceasing to exist when the ship sank. He collaborated with three other men to fund the construction of freighter John D. Perry. Another ship he was involved with was the eponymous Phil. E. Chappell, which operated from 1877 to 1886. He authored The History of Steamboating on the Missouri, published in 1905, and A History on the Missouri River.

Chappell managed his family's tobacco farm during the American Civil War, though later sold it and moved to Jefferson City in 1869. There, he engaged in banking and was affiliated with the city's ferry and natural gas companies. A Democrat, he was elected Jefferson City alderman then mayor, in 1870 and 1872, respectively, followed by his appointment as the city's collector in 1873. From 1881 to 1885, he served as State Treasurer of Missouri, for which he was paid $3,000 annually. In the 1890s, he served as a state revenue collector. Following his term, he moved to Kansas City, Missouri, where he engaged in its banking industry. He also president of the Hesperian Cattle Company, headquartered in Texas.

Chappell married Teresa Ellen Tarlton in July 1861, with whom he had five children. He died on February 23, 1908, aged 70, in Jefferson City.
