= Gézier-et-Fontenelay =

- Commune
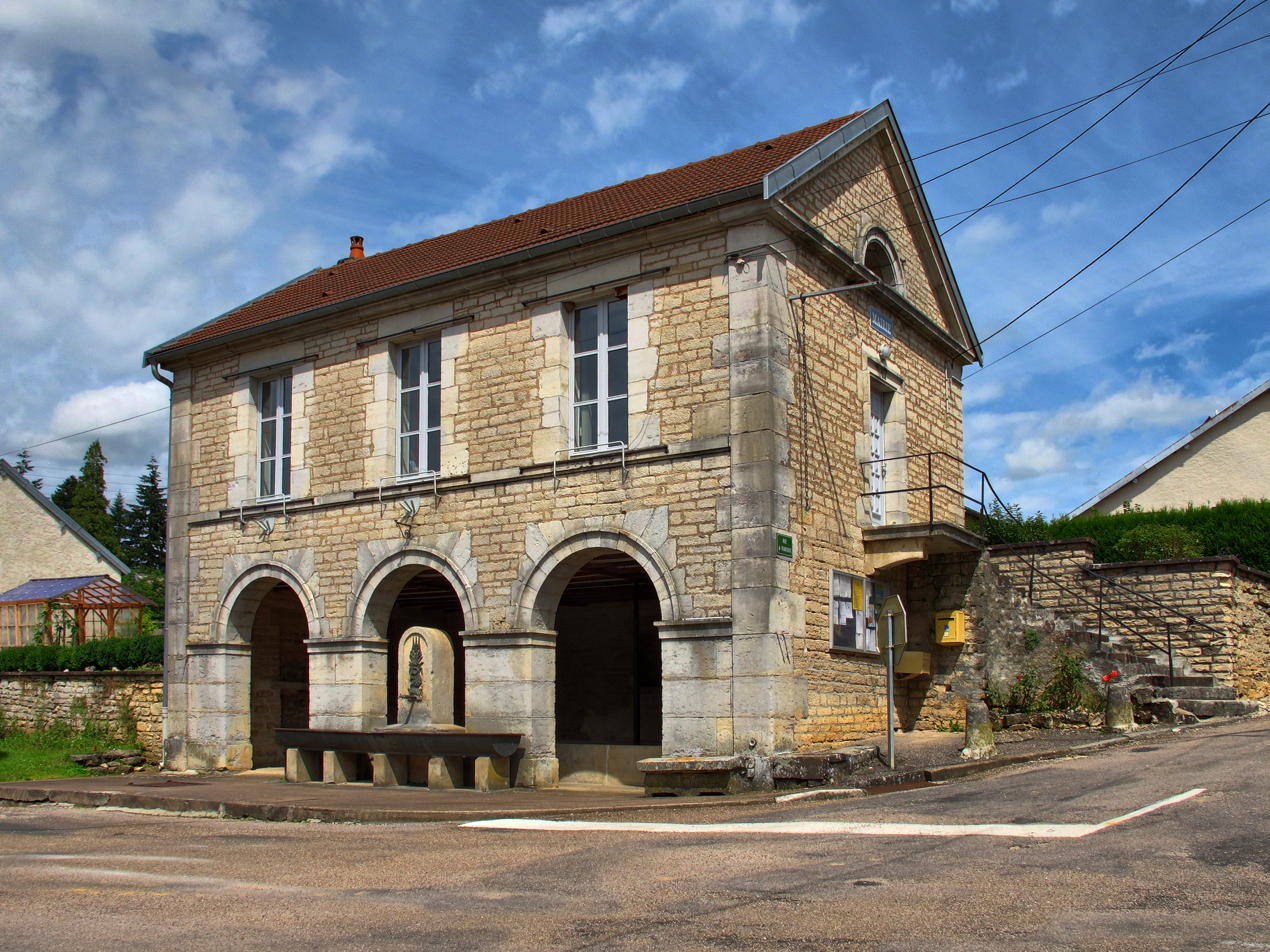
- The town hall and wash house in Gézier
- Location of Gézier-et-Fontenelay
- Location within France Location within Bourgogne-Franche-Comté
- Coordinates: 47°21′28″N 5°53′52″E
- Country: France
- Region: Bourgogne-Franche-Comté
- Department: Haute-Saône
- Arrondissement: Vesoul
- Canton: Marnay
- Area^{1}: 12.10 km^{2} (4.67 sq mi)
- Highest elevation: 367 m (1,204 ft)
- Lowest elevation: 225 m (738 ft)
- Population (2023): 219
  - Density: 18.1/km^{2} (46.9/sq mi)
- Time zone: UTC+01:00 (CET)
  - Summer (DST): UTC+02:00 (CEST)
- INSEE/Postal code: 70268 /70700
- ^{1} French Land Register data, which excludes lakes, ponds, glaciers > 1 km^{2} (0.386 sq mi or 247 acres) and river estuaries.

Gézier-et-Fontenelay (before 1992: Gézier-et-Fontelenay) is a commune in the Haute-Saône department in the region of Bourgogne-Franche-Comté in eastern France.

== See also ==
- Communes of the Haute-Saône department
