= William Bishop (politician) =

American politician (1817–1879)

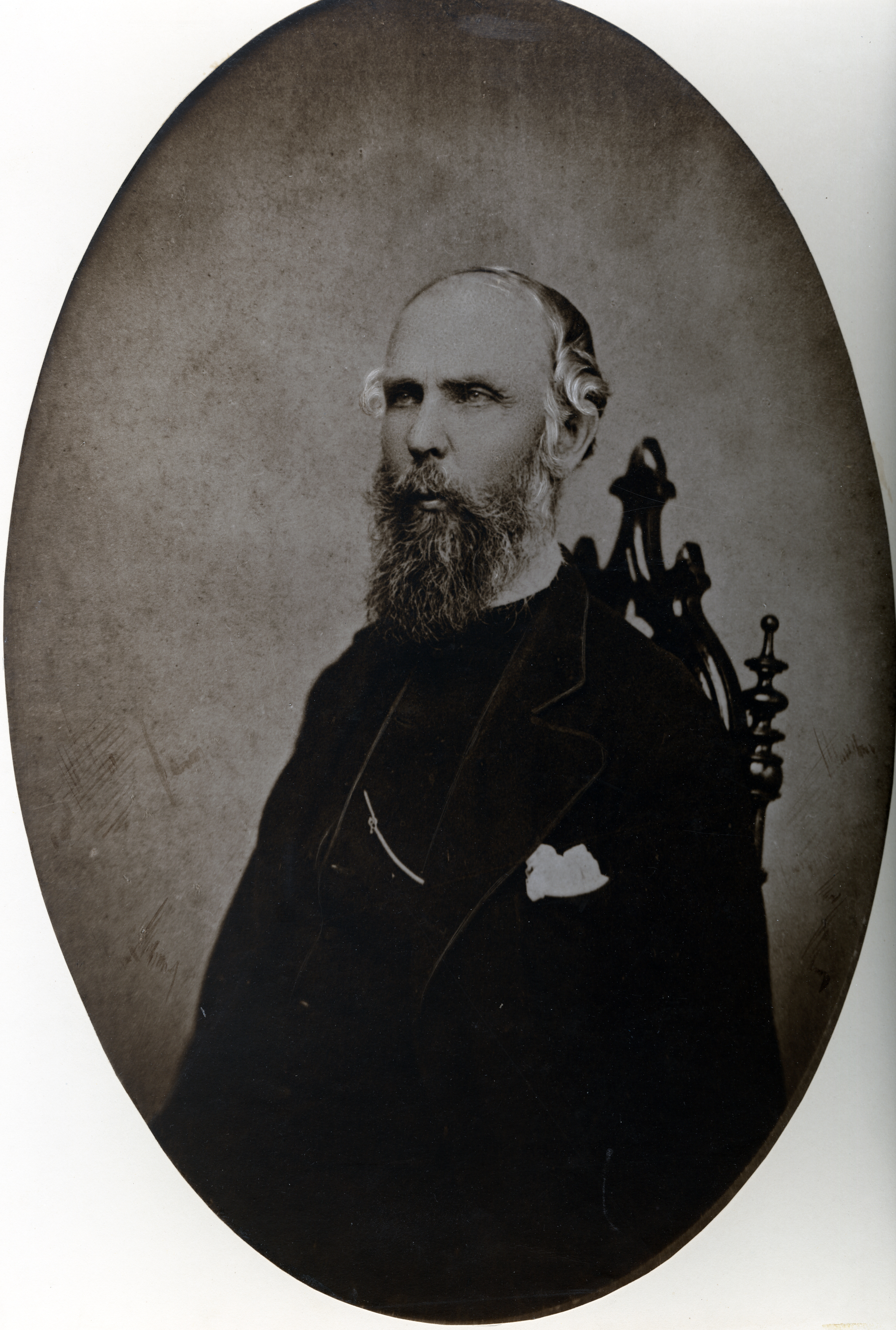

State Treasurer of Missouri
- In office 1865–1869
- Preceded by: George Caleb Bingham
- Succeeded by: William Q. Dallmeyer

Personal details
- Born: 1817 Martinsburg, Virginia, US
- Died: May 2, 1879 (aged 61–62) Kahoka, Missouri, US
- Party: Republican
- Occupation: Real estate seculator commodities broker politician
- Profession: Politician, military officer

William Bishop (1817 – May 2, 1879) was an American businessman, military officer and politician in the 19th century. He served as the State Treasurer of Missouri from 1865 to 1869.

== Biography ==
William H. Bishop was born in 1817, in Martinsburg, Virginia, but moved with his family to McLean County, Illinois as a child. His father, also named William, was a veteran of the War of 1812. William H. moved to Missouri as an adult and by 1846 was living in Clark County, Missouri where he became a wealthy land and commodities speculator. By the time of the 1860 United States Census, Bishop had real estate holdings valued at $20,000, a substantial sum in that era. In March 1861 he attended the first inauguration of Abraham Lincoln in hopes of receiving a political appointment.

At the outbreak of the American Civil War he was living in the Mississippi River port of Alexandria, Missouri. In June 1861 Union General Nathaniel Lyon asked him to help organize several units of Missouri Home Guards to protect the state from pro-Confederate Missouri State Guards and rebel guerrilla activity. Bishop challenged his friend David Moore for command of the newly formed 1st Northeast Missouri Home Guards, but lost the election. Undeterred, in July 1861 he began organizing a Cavalry battalion of Missouri Home Guard known as "Black Hawk Cavalry" at a training camp in Warsaw, Illinois. Following completion of training, the unit was garrisoned at Martinsburg, Audrain County, Missouri to protect the Hannibal and St. Joseph Railroad from attack by Confederate bushwhackers. The unit was involved in several skirmishes against Confederate Bushwhackers across the state including at Milford, Spring Hill, and Crabapple Grove (near present-day Sturgeon, Missouri). Colonel Bishop's time in command of the Black Hawk Cavalry was plagued by political infighting, supply difficulties, and conflict with his superiors. As a result, in February 1862 William Bishop was court-martialed on serious charges such as conduct unbecoming an officer, falsifying a muster roll, neglect of duty, and incompetence. He would be acquitted of all charges but removed from command of his unit, the Black Hawks being combined with other Union forces to create the 7th Missouri Cavalry Regiment.

Hoping to repair the damage to his reputation and career, in the spring of 1862, Bishop gathered letters of support and documentation pertaining to his acquittal and traveled to Washington D.C.. In a series of meetings he sought out a new military command or appointment to a political position. Unsuccessful, he returned to Alexandria, Missouri and resumed private business. Some time later he would be appointed Provost Marshal and port supervisor, positions he held until being elected Missouri's 9th State Treasurer in November 1864 as a member of the Radical Union Party. His term in office was unremarkable in any specific achievement, save for securing salary increases for his assistants and managing the funds for Missouri's post-Bellum recovery. After leaving office in 1869 he lived mostly a retired life before suffering a stroke and dying on May 2, 1879. Despite his earlier great wealth, He died with an estate valued at around $515. William and Mary Ann (Lapsley) Bishop—who had married in 1849—were the parents of six children. She survived him by an additional 40 years, dying on March 8, 1920. He is buried in Kahoka, Missouri.

Political offices
Preceded by George Caleb Bingham	State Treasurer of Missouri; 1865–1869	Succeeded by William Q. Dallmeyer
