= Harvey Wallis Salmon =

American politician (1839–1927)

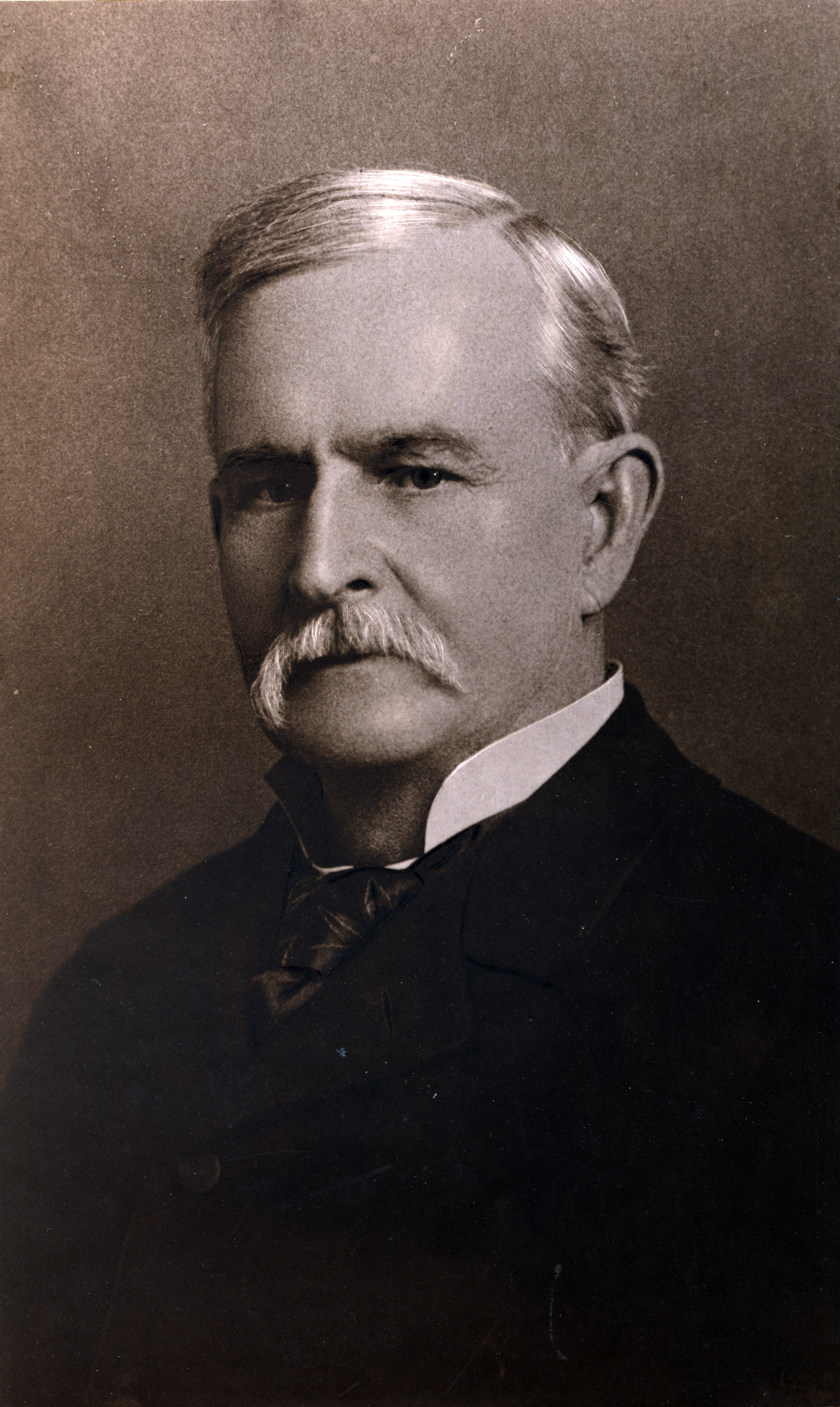

State Treasurer of Missouri
- In office 1873–1875
- Governor: Silas Woodson
- Preceded by: Samuel Hays
- Succeeded by: Joseph Wayne Mercer

Personal details
- Born: January 26, 1839 Greenville County, South Carolina, US
- Died: April 27, 1927 (aged 88) St. Louis, Missouri, US
- Party: Democratic
- Spouse: Katherine Kimbrough

Military service
- Allegiance: Confederate States of America
- Branch/service: Confederate States Army
- Years of service: 1861–1865
- Rank: Major
- Battles/wars: American Civil War; Battle of Carthage, Missouri; Battle of Wilson's Creek; Battle of Dry Wood Creek; First Battle of Lexington

Harvey Wallis Salmon (January 26, 1839 – April 27, 1927) was an American politician. He served as State Treasurer of Missouri from 1873 to 1875.

== Biography ==
Salmon was born on January 26, 1839, in Greenville County, South Carolina, the son of farmer Ezekial J. Salmon. In 1859, he moved to Morgan County, Missouri, where he worked in general stores. During the American Civil War, he served in the Missouri State Guard and fought in the Battle of Carthage, Missouri; the Battle of Wilson's Creek; the Battle of Dry Wood Creek; and the First Battle of Lexington. In November 1861, he left active service and continued as a recruiter. He spent ten months imprisoned by the Union Army, and after being released, worked under Mosby Monroe Parsons. He was ranked Major. He maintained the Lost Cause of the Confederacy viewpoint after the war.

Following the war, Salmon relocated to Clinton, Missouri, where he and his brother engaged in real estate and banking. A Democrat, he was elected State Treasurer of Missouri, serving from 1873 to 1875, which he was paid $3,000 per year for. He lowered public debt by more than $1,000,000. Following his term, he persisted in politics, heading the Democratic Party's executive committee for electoral campaigns in 1892 and 1896; he was also a delegate to the Democratic National Convention in 1902.

Salmon married Mary Katherine Kimbrough on November 16, 1871; they had four children together. In his later life, he lived in St. Louis, dying there on April 27, 1927, aged 88, at the Missouri Baptist Medical Center. He had fallen and broken his arm prior to being admitted to the hospital. He is buried in the Englewood Cemetery, in Clinton.

Political offices
| Preceded by Samuel Hays | Missouri State Treasurer; 1873–1875 | Succeeded by Joseph Wayne Mercer |
