= Elijah Gates =

American politician (1827–1915)

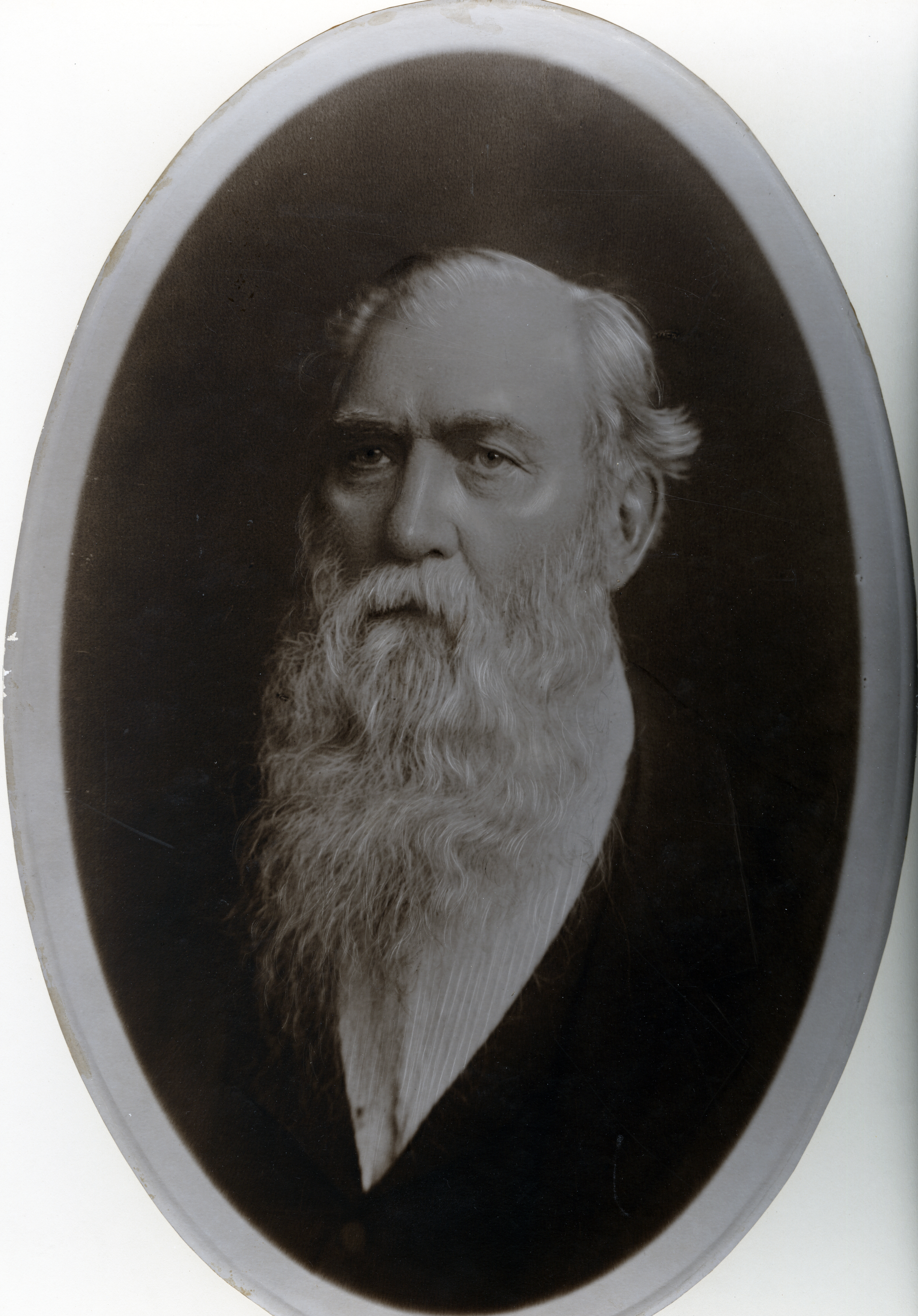

State Treasurer of Missouri
- In office 1877–1881
- Preceded by: Joseph Wayne Mercer
- Succeeded by: Phillip Edward Chappell

Personal details
- Born: December 17, 1827 Garrard County, Kentucky, U.S.
- Died: March 4, 1915 (aged 87) St. Joseph, Missouri, U.S.
- Resting place: Mount Mora Cemetery
- Spouse: Maria Stamper
- Children: 12
- Occupation: Sheriff, politician, U.S. Marshal
- Profession: Army officer, farmer

Military service
- Allegiance: Confederate States of America
- Branch/service: Confederate States Army
- Years of service: 1861–1865
- Rank: Colonel
- Commands: 1st Missouri Cavalry Regiment; 1st Missouri Brigade
- Battles/wars: American Civil War; Battle of Pea Ridge; Siege of Corinth; Battle of Iuka; Second Battle of Corinth; Battle of Champion Hill; Battle of Big Black River Bridge; Siege of Vicksburg; Atlanta campaign; Battle of Allatoona; Battle of Franklin; Battle of Fort Blakeley

Elijah P. Gates (December 17, 1827 – March 4, 1915) was an American politician and military officer. He served as State Treasurer of Missouri from 1877 to 1881.

== Biography ==
Gates was born on December 17, 1827, in Garrard County, Kentucky, and moved to Missouri c. 1846. He settled on a farm in Buchanan County. In 1852, he married Maria Stamper, with who, he had twelve children.

At the outbreak of the American Civil War in 1861, Gates enlisted in the Confederate Army, starting as a captain in the Missouri State Guard under the command of General Sterling Price, and was later promoted to colonel of the 1st Missouri Cavalry Regiment. He commanded his regiment at the Battle of Pea Ridge, Arkansas in March 1862, during the Siege of Corinth, Mississippi, and at the Battles of Iuka, Second Corinth, Champion Hill, Big Black River Bridge and at the Siege of Vicksburg, Mississippi. He also temporarily commanded the 1st Missouri Brigade. In 1864, Gates participated in the Atlanta campaign and the Battle of Allatoona, Georgia, and lost an arm at the Battle of Franklin, Tennessee. During his service, he was wounded five times, captured by Union forces three times, and had four horses shot from underneath him. On April 9, 1865, the same day Confederate General Robert E. Lee surrendered to Union General Ulysses S. Grant, Colonel Gates was engaged in one of the last battles of the Civil War, the Battle of Fort Blakeley in Alabama.

Following the war, Gates returned to his farm. In 1874, he was elected as Sheriff of Buchanan County, serving in that post until 1877. From 1877 to 1881, he served as State Treasurer of Missouri. Following his tenure, he served as United States Marshal for the Western District of Missouri under President Grover Cleveland, and was engaged in the transfer and bus business in St. Joseph, Missouri until his death on March 4, 1915, aged 87, in St. Joseph, Missouri. He is buried in Mount Mora Cemetery.

Political offices
Preceded by Joseph Wayne Mercer	Missouri State Treasurer; 1877–1881	Succeeded by Phillip Edward Chappell
