= Joseph Wayne Mercer =

American politician (1845–1906)

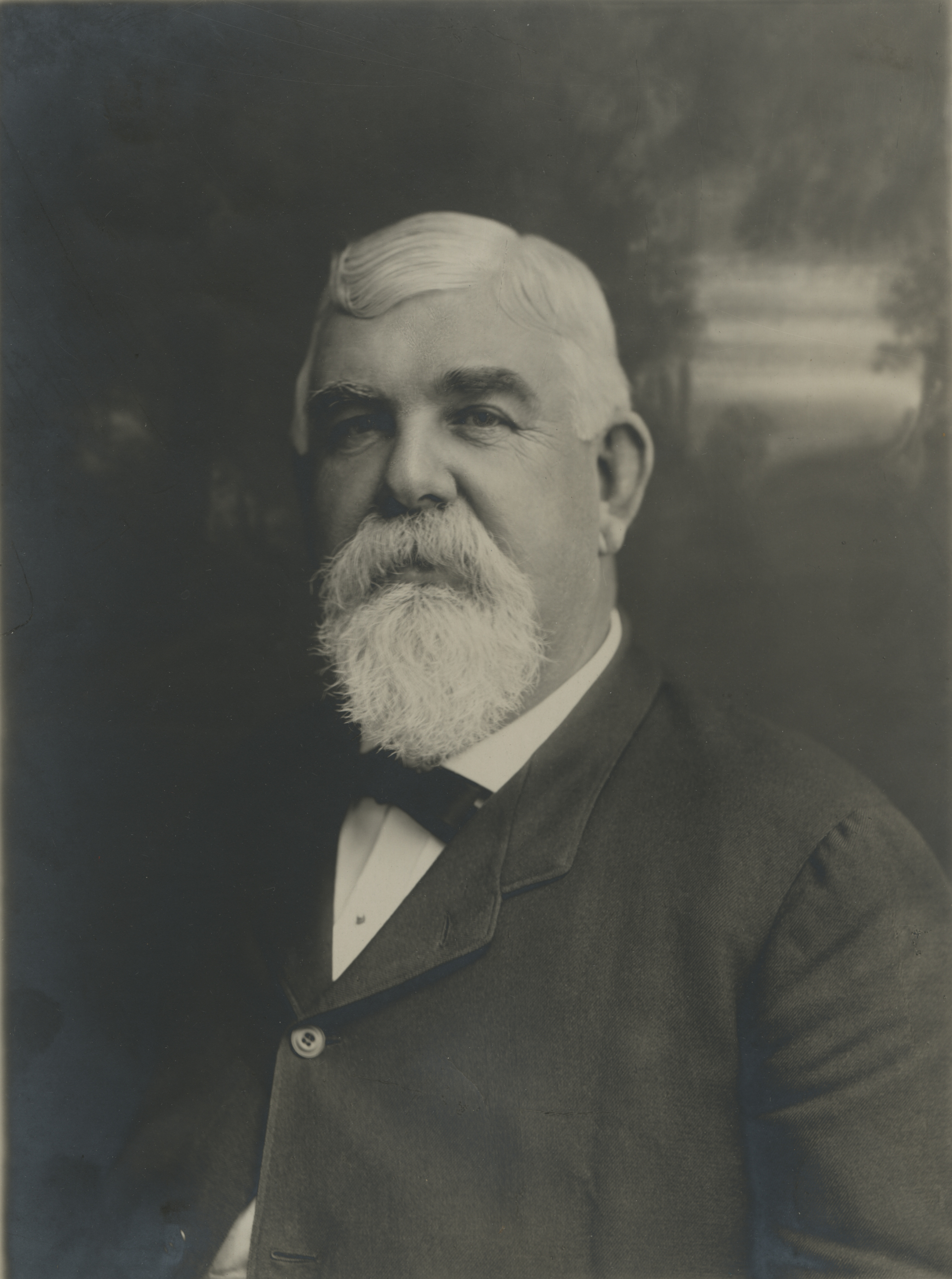

Missouri State Treasurer
- In office 1875–1877
- Preceded by: Harvey Wallis Salmon
- Succeeded by: Elijah Gates

Mayor of Independence, Missouri
- In office 1892–1893
- Preceded by: Cornell Crysler
- Succeeded by: Persifor H. Grinter

Personal details
- Born: February 25, 1845 Platte City, Missouri, US
- Died: March 13, 1906 (aged 61) Independence, Missouri, US
- Party: Democratic
- Children: 4

Military service
- Allegiance: Confederate States of America
- Branch/service: Confederate States Army
- Years of service: 1861–1865
- Rank: Captain
- Unit: Missouri
- Battles/wars: American Civil War

Joseph Wayne Mercer (February 25, 1845 – March 13, 1906) was an American politician. He served as State Treasurer of Missouri from 1875 to 1877, as well as a term as mayor of Independence, Missouri.

== Biography ==
Mercer was born on February 25, 1845, in Platte City, Missouri. His parents were Thomas W. Mercer, a construction worker, and Henrietta Mercer (née Dukes); both were Tennessee natives. He attended Chapel Hill College.

During the American Civil War, Mercer served in the 10th Missouri Cavalry Regiment of the Confederate States Army, under Sterling Price. He fought in the battles of Lexington, Pea Ridge, and Pine Bluff, sustaining injuries in all of them. His leg was injured at Lexington, and his right arm was amptutated at Pine Bluff. Following the amputation, he served in the Army's commissary department at the rank of captain, alongside John S. Marmaduke. Following the war, he attended Jones' Commercial College, then moved to Independence, Missouri, where he worked as an educator; he walked three miles to the school and back each day.

A Democrat, Mercer was elected to the Independence City Council, and later served as Treasurer of Jackson County, Missouri. From 1875 to 1877, he served as State Treasurer of Missouri, as which he was paid $3,000 annually, as well as $500 per year to cover contingent expenses. He was respected bipartisanly as treasurer. Following his term, he returned to Independence, where he worked in the real estate, banking, and grocery industries. Between 1892 and 1893, he served one term as Mayor of Independence. He became county judge for the Eastern District of Jackson County in 1902. He was also a delegate of the Democratic National Convention at one point.

Mercer married Laura Green (or Greene) on May 18, 1870; they had four children together. He died on March 13, 1906, aged 61, in Independence, Missouri, from heart failure. He is buried at Mt. Washington Cemetery, in Independence.

Political offices
Preceded by Harvey Wallis Salmon	Missouri State Treasurer; 1875–1877	Succeeded by Elijah Gates
