= State Treasurer of Missouri =

Statewide elected official

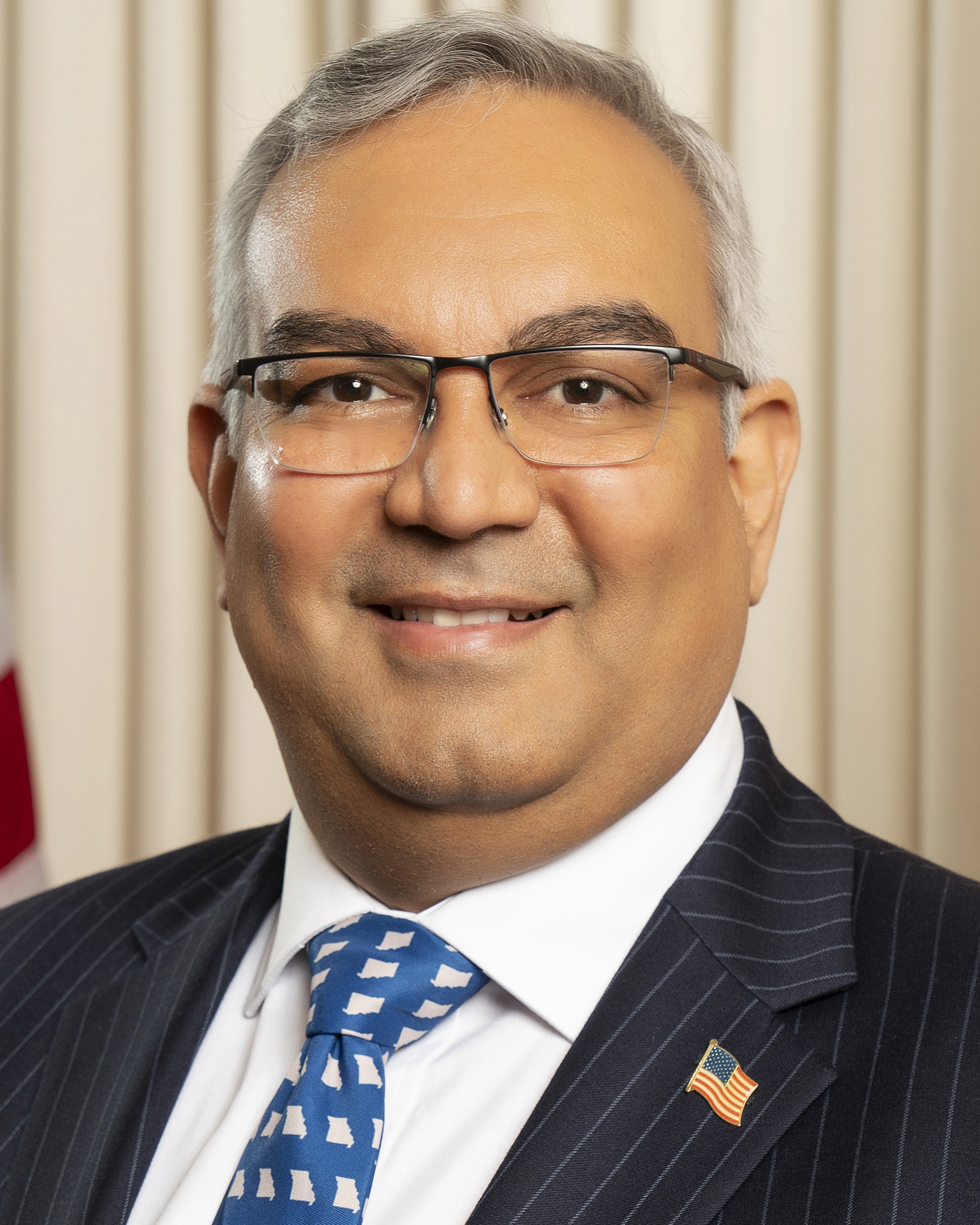
- Incumbent; Vivek Malek since January 17, 2023
- Type: State Treasurer
- Term length: Four years, renewable once
- Formation: 1820
- First holder: John Peter Didier
- Succession: Sixth
- Website: Missouri State Treasurer's Website

The state treasurer of Missouri is a statewide elected official responsible for serving as Missouri's chief financial officer. Vivek Malek has served as state treasurer since January 2023.

== Duties of the state treasurer ==
The state treasurer is responsible for managing more than $24 billion in annual revenues and more than $3.6 billion in state investments. Additionally, the state treasurer works to return nearly $700 million in unclaimed property to more than 4.3 million account owners. The state treasurer also helps oversee MOST - Missouri's 529 College Savings Plan, which helps families start building a college fund.

As banking director for the state government, the state treasurer is responsible for authorizing disbursement of state funds, balancing the state accounts, contracting with private banks to process state receipts and disbursements, manage money and security transfers, and reporting on the state's financial activities. The state treasurer partners with Missouri banks to make low-interest loans to small businesses and farms through Missouri FIRST.

The state treasurer represents taxpayers by serving on the governing boards of the Missouri Housing Development Commission, the Missouri State Employees' Retirement System, the state Board of Fund Commissioners, and the Missouri Cultural Trust Board.

== List of state treasurers ==
#	Image	Name	Party	Term
1		John Peter Didier	Independent	1820–1821
2		Nathaniel Simonds	Democratic-Republican	1821–1829
3		James Earickson	Democratic	1829–1833
4		John Walker	Democratic	1833–1838
5		Abraham McClellan	Democratic	1838–1843
6		Peter Garland Glover	Democratic	1843–1851
7		Alfred William Morrison	Democratic	1851–1861
8		George Caleb Bingham	Democratic	1862–1865
9		William Bishop	Republican	1865–1869
10		William Q. Dallmeyer	Republican	1869–1871
11		Samuel Hays	Republican	1871–1873
12		Harvey Wallis Salmon	Democratic	1873–1875
13		Joseph Wayne Mercer	Democratic	1875–1877
14		Elijah Gates	Democratic	1877–1881
15		Phillip Edward Chappell	Democratic	1881–1885
16		James M. Seibert	Democratic	1885–1889
17		Edward T. Noland	Democratic	1889–1890
18		Lawrence Vest Stephens	Democratic	1890–1897
19		Frank L. Pitts	Democratic	1897–1901
20		Robert P. Williams	Democratic	1901–1905
21		Jacob F. Gmelich	Republican	1905–1909
22		James Cowgill	Democratic	1909–1913
23		Edwin P. Deal	Democratic	1913–1917
24		George H. Middelkamp	Democratic	1917–1921
25		Lorenzo Dow Thompson	Republican	1921–1925
26		C. Eugene Stephens	Republican	1925–1929
27		Larry Brunk	Republican	1929–1933
28		Richard R. Nacy	Democratic	1933–1937
29		Robert W. Winn	Democratic	1937–1941
30		Wilson Bell	Democratic	1941–1945
31		Robert W. Winn	Democratic	1945–1948
32		Richard R. Nacy	Democratic	1948–1949
33		Mount Etna Morris	Democratic	1949–1953
34		George Hubert Bates	Democratic	1953–1957
35		Mount Etna Morris	Democratic	1957–1961
36		Milton Carpenter	Democratic	1961–1965
37		Mount Etna Morris	Democratic	1965–1969
38		William Edmond Robinson	Democratic	1969–1973
39		Jim Spainhower	Democratic	1973–1981
40		Mel Carnahan	Democratic	1981–1985
41		Wendell Bailey	Republican	1985–1993
42		Bob Holden	Democratic	1993–2001
43		Nancy Farmer	Democratic	2001–2005
44		Sarah Steelman	Republican	2005–2009
45		Clint Zweifel	Democratic	2009–2017
46		Eric Schmitt	Republican	2017–2019
47		Scott Fitzpatrick	Republican	2019–2023
48		Vivek Malek	Republican	2023–present
