= 1928 Missouri State Treasurer election =

- November 6, 1928
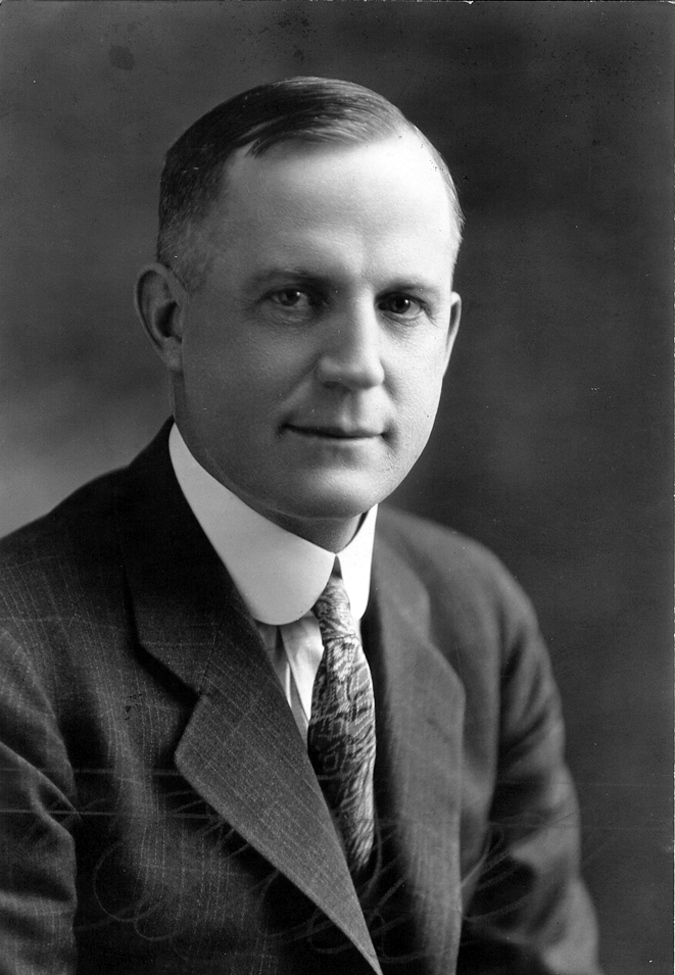

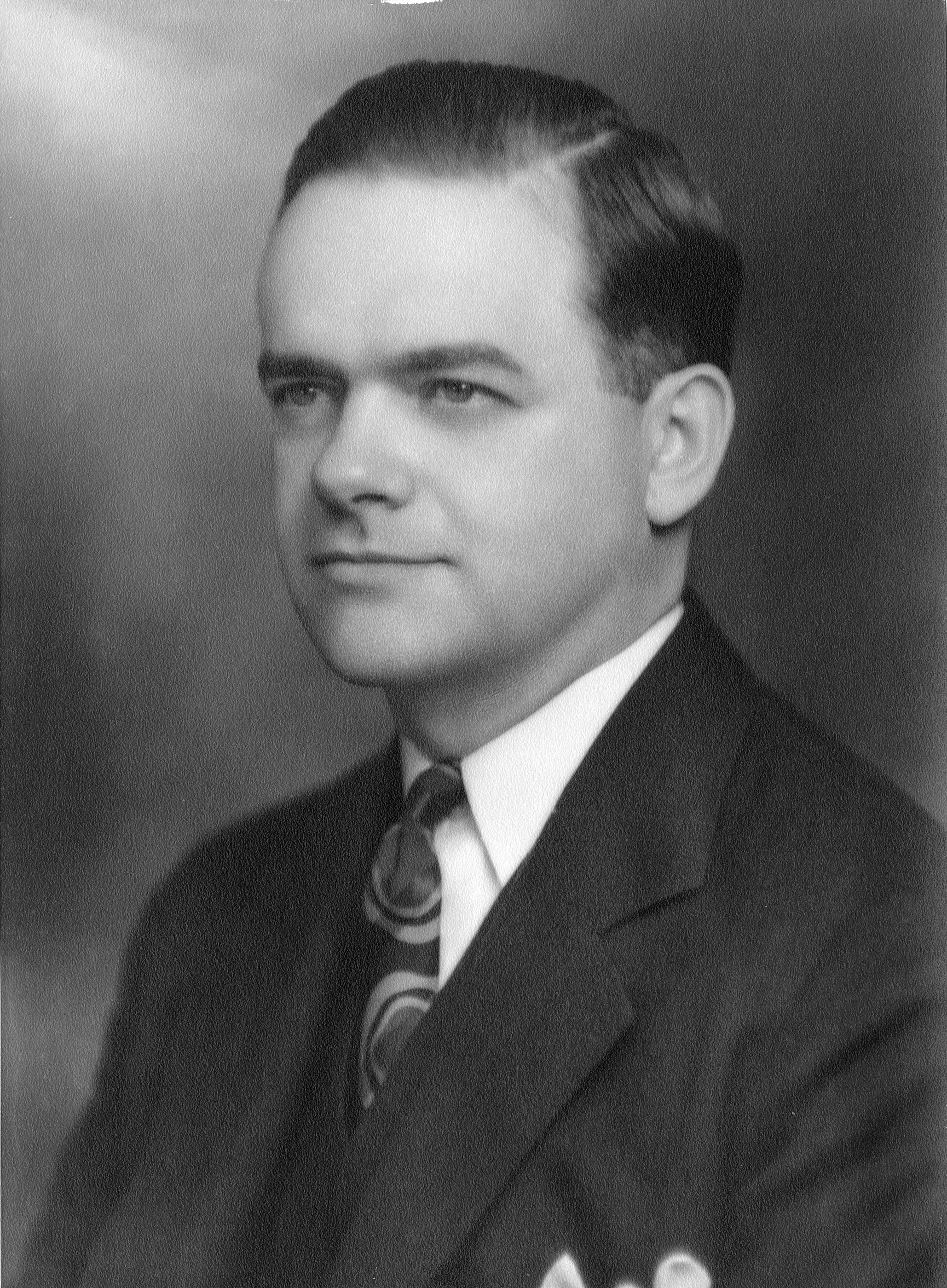
Nominee	Larry Brunk	Richard R. Nacy
Party	Republican	Democratic
Popular vote	800,727	712,866
Percentage	52.81%	47.01%
State Treasurer before election
C. Eugene Stephens
Republican
Elected State Treasurer
Larry Brunk
Republican

The 1928 Missouri State Treasurer election was held on November 6, 1928, in order to elect the state treasurer of Missouri. Republican nominee Larry Brunk defeated Democratic nominee Richard R. Nacy, Socialist nominee Henry Siroky and Socialist Labor nominee James Wagoner.

== General election ==
On election day, November 6, 1928, Republican nominee Larry Brunk won the election by a margin of 87,861 votes against his foremost opponent Democratic nominee Richard R. Nacy, thereby retaining Republican control over the office of state treasurer. Brunk was sworn in as the 27th state treasurer of Missouri on January 14, 1929.

=== Results ===
Missouri State Treasurer election, 1928
Party	Candidate	Votes	%
Republican	Larry Brunk	800,727	52.81
Democratic	Richard R. Nacy	712,866	47.01
Socialist	Henry Siroky	2,447	0.16
Socialist Labor	James Wagoner	243	0.02
Total votes		1,516,283	100.00
Republican hold			

== See also ==
- 1928 Missouri gubernatorial election
