= 1972 Missouri State Treasurer election =

- November 7, 1972
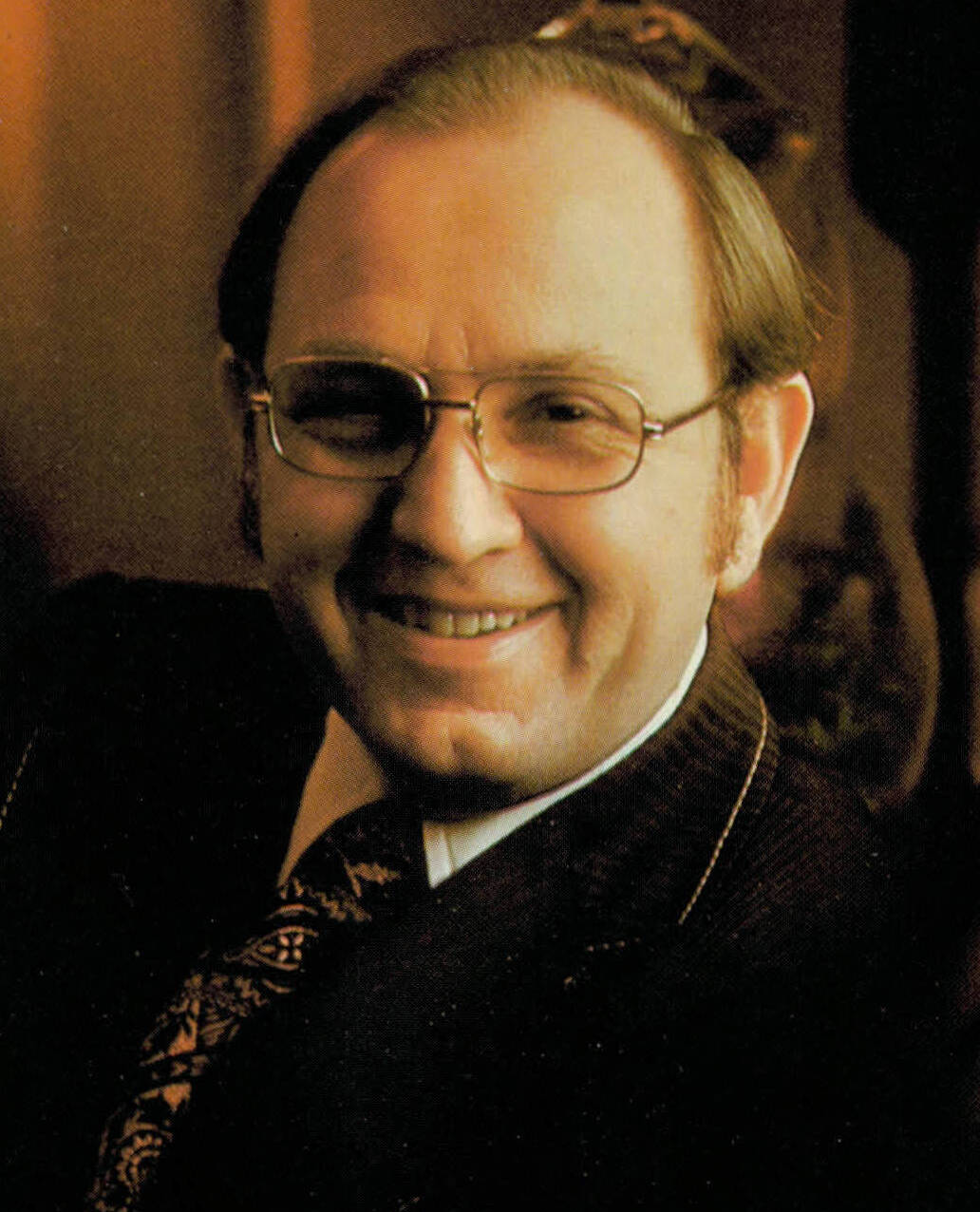

Nominee	Jim Spainhower	George W. Parker
Party	Democratic	Republican
Popular vote	980,278	816,739
Percentage	54.55%	45.45%
State Treasurer before election
William Edmond Robinson
Democratic
Elected State Treasurer
Jim Spainhower
Democratic

The 1972 Missouri State Treasurer election was held on November 7, 1972, in order to elect the state treasurer of Missouri. Democratic nominee and former member of the Missouri House of Representatives Jim Spainhower defeated Republican nominee George W. Parker.

== General election ==
On election day, November 7, 1972, Democratic nominee Jim Spainhower won the election by a margin of 163,539 votes against his opponent Republican nominee George W. Parker, thereby retaining Democratic control over the office of state treasurer. Spainhower was sworn in as the 39th state treasurer of Missouri on January 8, 1973.

=== Results ===
Missouri State Treasurer election, 1972
Party	Candidate	Votes	%
Democratic	Jim Spainhower	980,278	54.55
Republican	George W. Parker	816,739	45.45
Total votes		1,797,017	100.00
Democratic hold			

== See also ==
- 1972 Missouri gubernatorial election
