= 1948 Missouri State Treasurer election =

- November 2, 1948
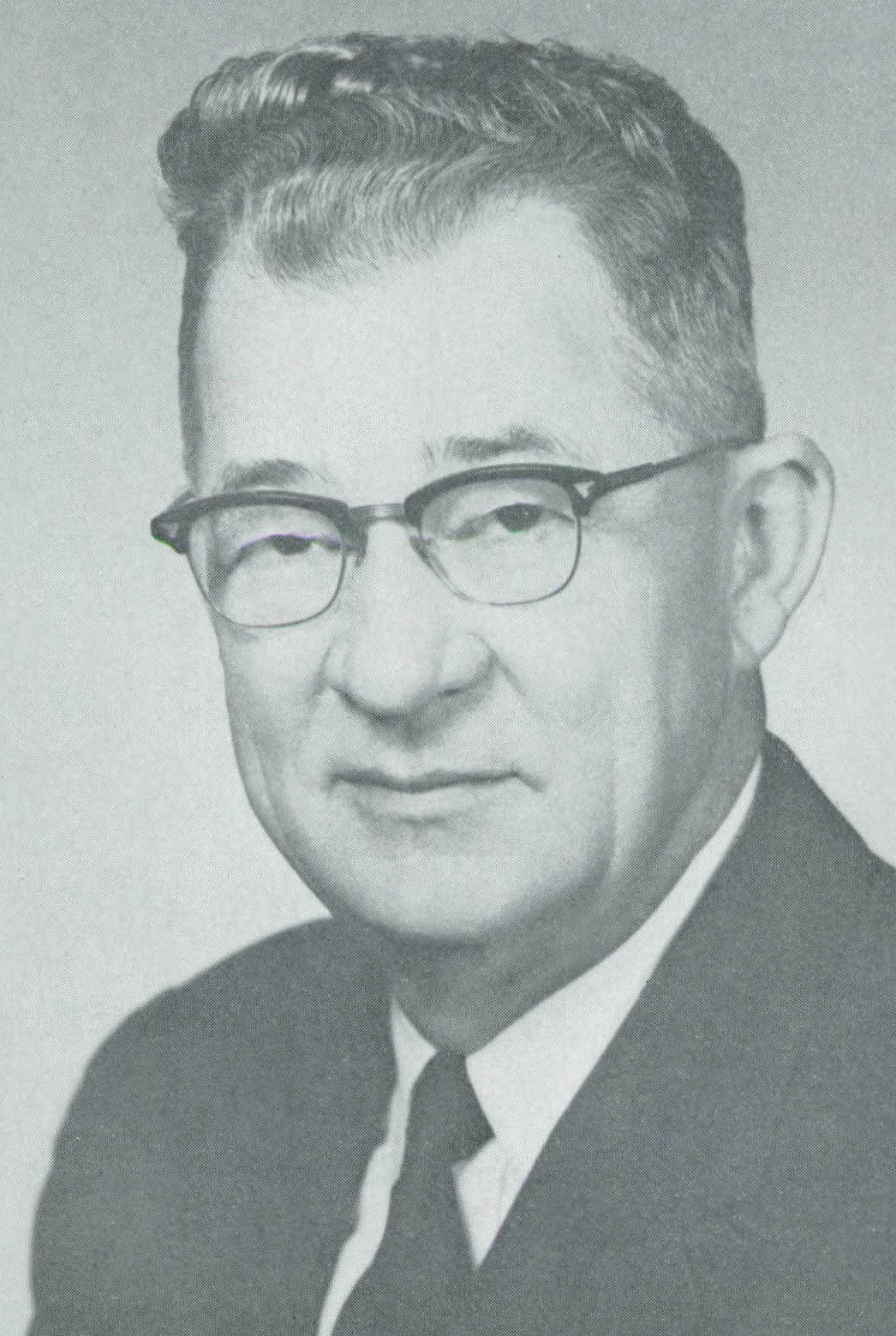

Nominee	Mount Etna Morris	Vern F. Carpenter
Party	Democratic	Republican
Popular vote	902,394	646,906
Percentage	58.09%	41.65%
State Treasurer before election
Richard R. Nacy (Acting)
Democratic
Elected State Treasurer
Mount Etna Morris
Democratic

The 1948 Missouri State Treasurer election was held on November 2, 1948, in order to elect the state treasurer of Missouri. Democratic nominee and former member of the Missouri House of Representatives Mount Etna Morris defeated Republican nominee Vern F. Carpenter, Progressive nominee James W. Cowen, Socialist nominee Lucy Henschel and Socialist Labor nominee Theodore Baeff.

== General election ==
On election day, November 2, 1948, Democratic nominee Mount Etna Morris won the election by a margin of 255,488 votes against his foremost opponent Republican nominee Vern F. Carpenter, thereby retaining Democratic control over the office of state treasurer. Morris was sworn in as the 33rd state treasurer of Missouri on January 10, 1949.

=== Results ===
Missouri State Treasurer election, 1948
Party	Candidate	Votes	%
Democratic	Mount Etna Morris	902,394	58.09
Republican	Vern F. Carpenter	646,906	41.65
Progressive	James W. Cowen	2,828	0.18
Socialist	Lucy Henschel	1,101	0.07
Socialist Labor	Theodore Baeff	145	0.01
Total votes		1,553,374	100.00
Democratic hold			

== See also ==
- 1948 Missouri gubernatorial election
