= 1960 Missouri State Treasurer election =

- November 8, 1960
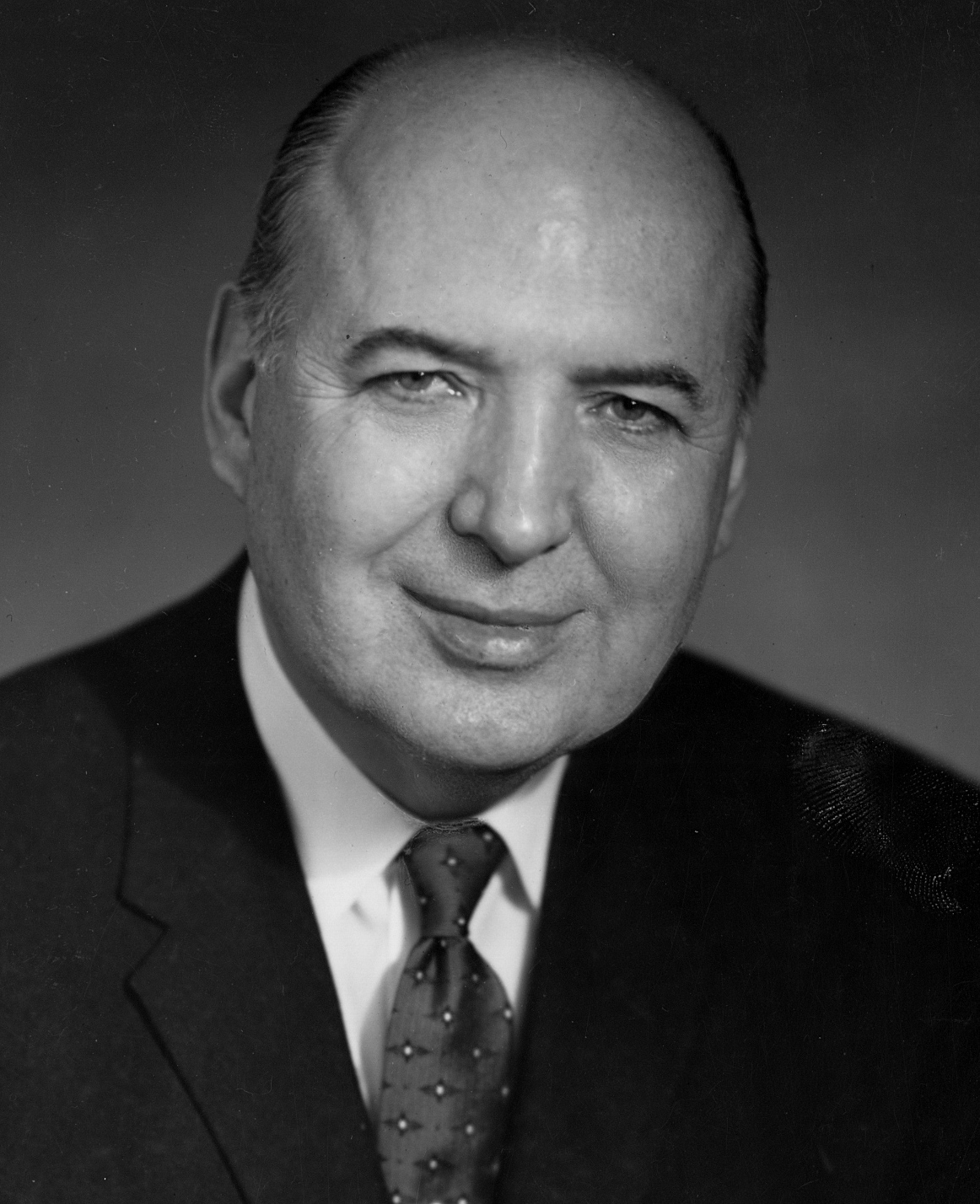

Nominee	Milton Carpenter	F. P. Graves
Party	Democratic	Republican
Popular vote	1,073,356	797,034
Percentage	57.39%	42.61%
State Treasurer before election
Mount Etna Morris
Democratic
Elected State Treasurer
Milton Carpenter
Democratic

The 1960 Missouri State Treasurer election was held on November 8, 1960, in order to elect the state treasurer of Missouri. Democratic nominee Milton Carpenter defeated Republican nominee F. P. Graves.

== General election ==
On election day, November 8, 1960, Democratic nominee Milton Carpenter won the election by a margin of 276,322 votes against his opponent Republican nominee F. P. Graves, thereby retaining Democratic control over the office of state treasurer. Carpenter was sworn in as the 36th state treasurer of Missouri on January 9, 1961.

=== Results ===
Missouri State Treasurer election, 1960
Party	Candidate	Votes	%
Democratic	Milton Carpenter	1,073,356	57.39
Republican	F. P. Graves	797,034	42.61
Total votes		1,870,390	100.00
Democratic hold			

== See also ==
- 1960 Missouri gubernatorial election
