= 1964 Missouri State Treasurer election =

- November 3, 1964
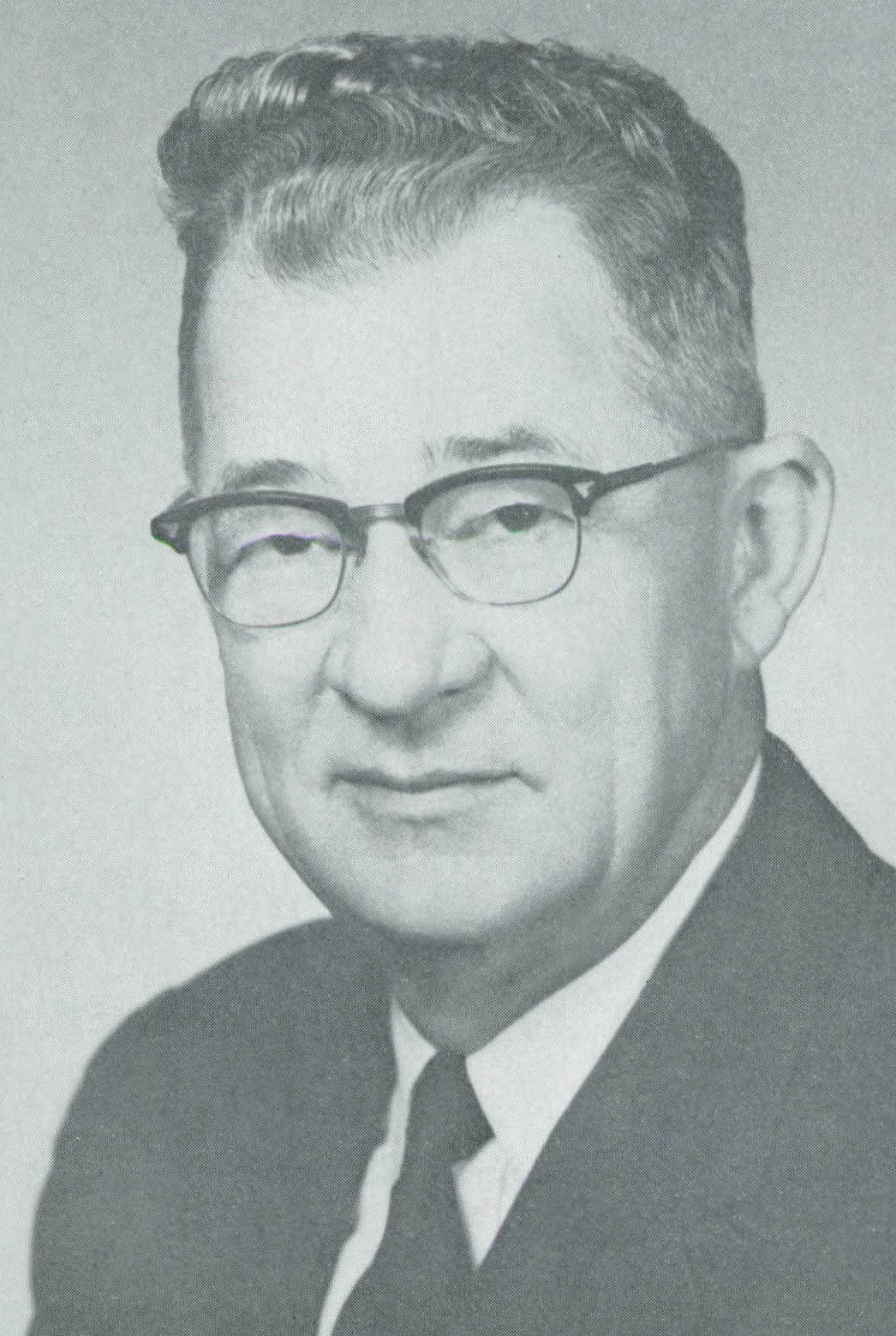

Nominee	Mount Etna Morris	Perry Compton
Party	Democratic	Republican
Popular vote	1,111,687	640,767
Percentage	63.44%	36.56%
State Treasurer before election
Milton Carpenter
Democratic
Elected State Treasurer
Mount Etna Morris
Democratic

The 1964 Missouri State Treasurer election was held on November 3, 1964, in order to elect the state treasurer of Missouri. Democratic nominee and former state treasurer Mount Etna Morris defeated Republican nominee Perry Compton.

== General election ==
On election day, November 3, 1964, Democratic nominee Mount Etna Morris won the election by a margin of 470,920 votes against his opponent Republican nominee Perry Compton, thereby retaining Democratic control over the office of state treasurer. Morris was sworn in for his third non-consecutive term on January 11, 1965.

=== Results ===
Missouri State Treasurer election, 1964
Party	Candidate	Votes	%
Democratic	Mount Etna Morris	1,111,687	63.44
Republican	Perry Compton	640,767	36.56
Total votes		1,752,454	100.00
Democratic hold			

== See also ==
- 1964 Missouri gubernatorial election
