= 1956 Missouri State Treasurer election =

- November 6, 1956
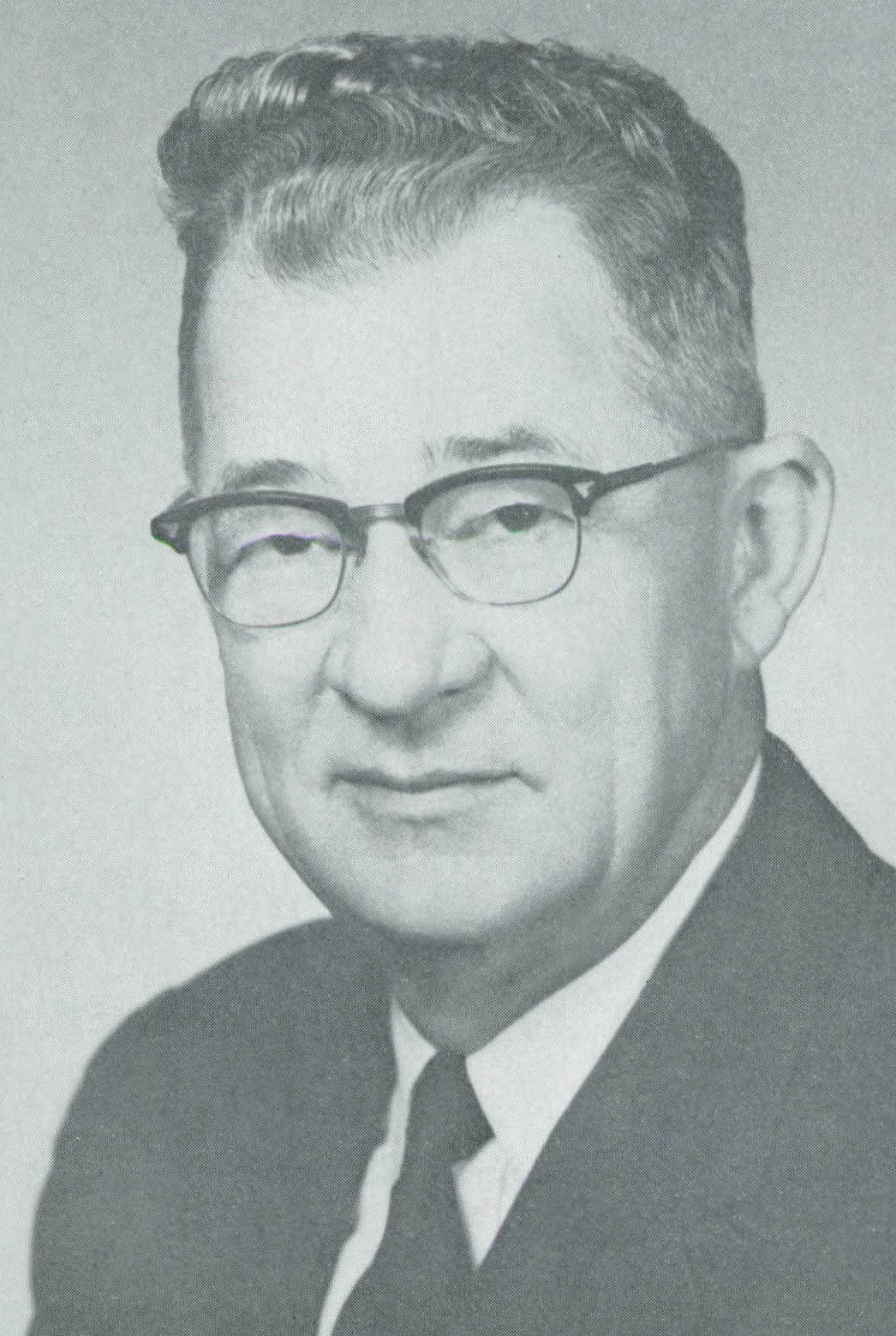

Nominee	Mount Etna Morris	F. P. Graves
Party	Democratic	Republican
Popular vote	970,280	817,200
Percentage	54.28%	45.72%
State Treasurer before election
George Hubert Bates
Democratic
Elected State Treasurer
Mount Etna Morris
Democratic

The 1956 Missouri State Treasurer election was held on November 6, 1956, in order to elect the state treasurer of Missouri. Democratic nominee and former state treasurer Mount Etna Morris defeated Republican nominee F. P. Graves.

== General election ==
On election day, November 6, 1956, Democratic nominee Mount Etna Morris won the election by a margin of 153,080 votes against his opponent Republican nominee F. P. Graves, thereby retaining Democratic control over the office of state treasurer. Morris was sworn in for his second non-consecutive term on January 14, 1957.

=== Results ===
Missouri State Treasurer election, 1956
Party	Candidate	Votes	%
Democratic	Mount Etna Morris	970,280	54.28
Republican	F. P. Graves	817,200	45.72
Total votes		1,787,480	100.00
Democratic hold			

== See also ==
- 1956 Missouri gubernatorial election
