= 1952 Missouri State Treasurer election =

- November 4, 1952
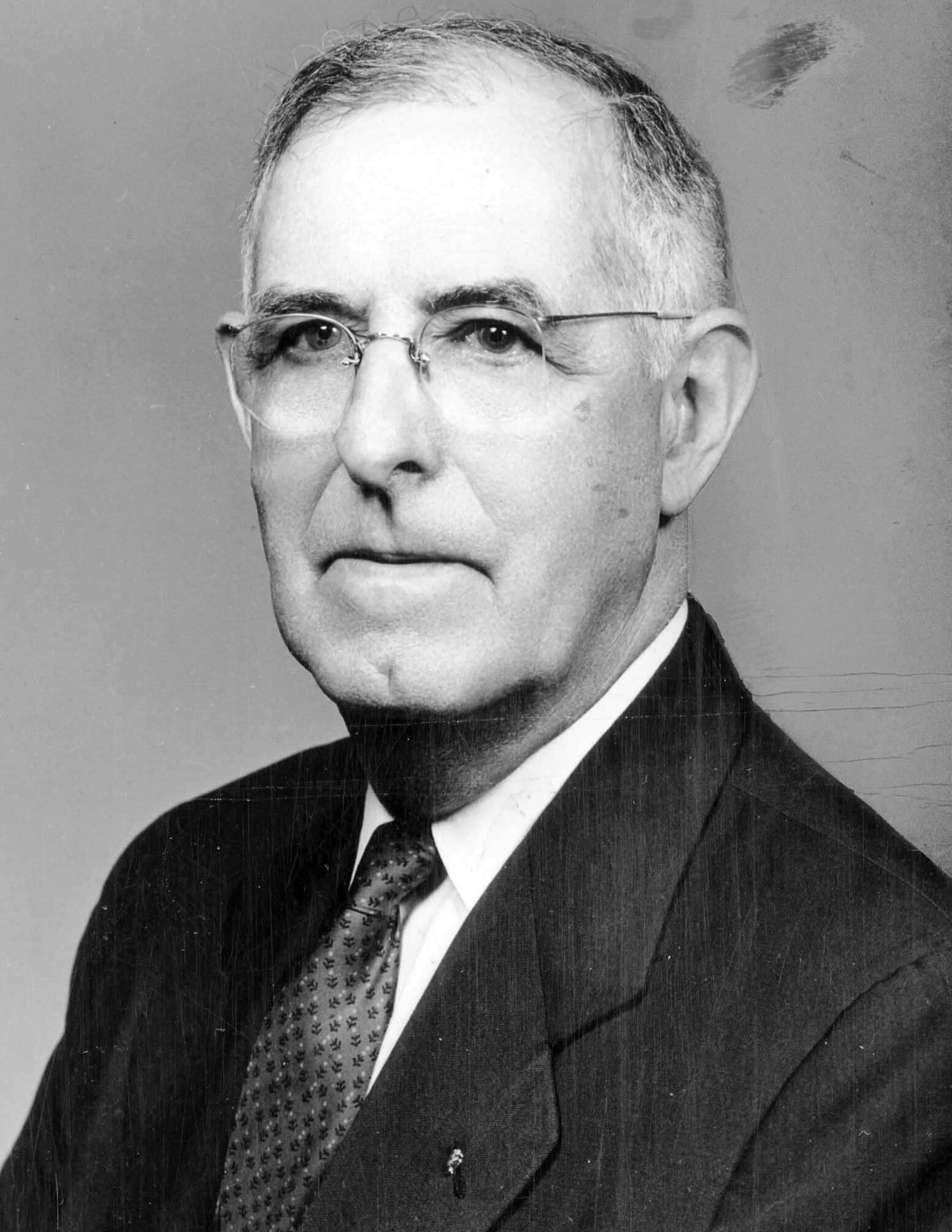

Nominee	George Hubert Bates	Vern F. Carpenter
Party	Democratic	Republican
Popular vote	961,700	891,899
Percentage	51.86%	48.09%
State Treasurer before election
Mount Etna Morris
Democratic
Elected State Treasurer
George Hubert Bates
Democratic

The 1952 Missouri State Treasurer election was held on November 4, 1952, in order to elect the state treasurer of Missouri. Democratic nominee George Hubert Bates defeated Republican nominee Vern F. Carpenter, Prohibition nominee Bertha M. Boutell, Socialist nominee Elizabeth Erbe and Socialist Labor nominee Theodore Baeff.

== General election ==
On election day, November 4, 1952, Democratic nominee George Hubert Bates won the election by a margin of 69,801 votes against his foremost opponent Republican nominee Vern F. Carpenter, thereby retaining Democratic control over the office of state treasurer. Bates was sworn in as the 34th state treasurer of Missouri on January 12, 1953.

=== Results ===
Missouri State Treasurer election, 1952
Party	Candidate	Votes	%
Democratic	George Hubert Bates	961,700	51.86
Republican	Vern F. Carpenter	891,899	48.09
Prohibition	Bertha M. Boutell	534	0.03
Socialist	Elizabeth Erbe	227	0.01
Socialist Labor	Theodore Baeff	145	0.01
Total votes		1,854,505	100.00
Democratic hold			

== See also ==
- 1952 Missouri gubernatorial election
