= 1932 Missouri State Treasurer election =

- November 8, 1932
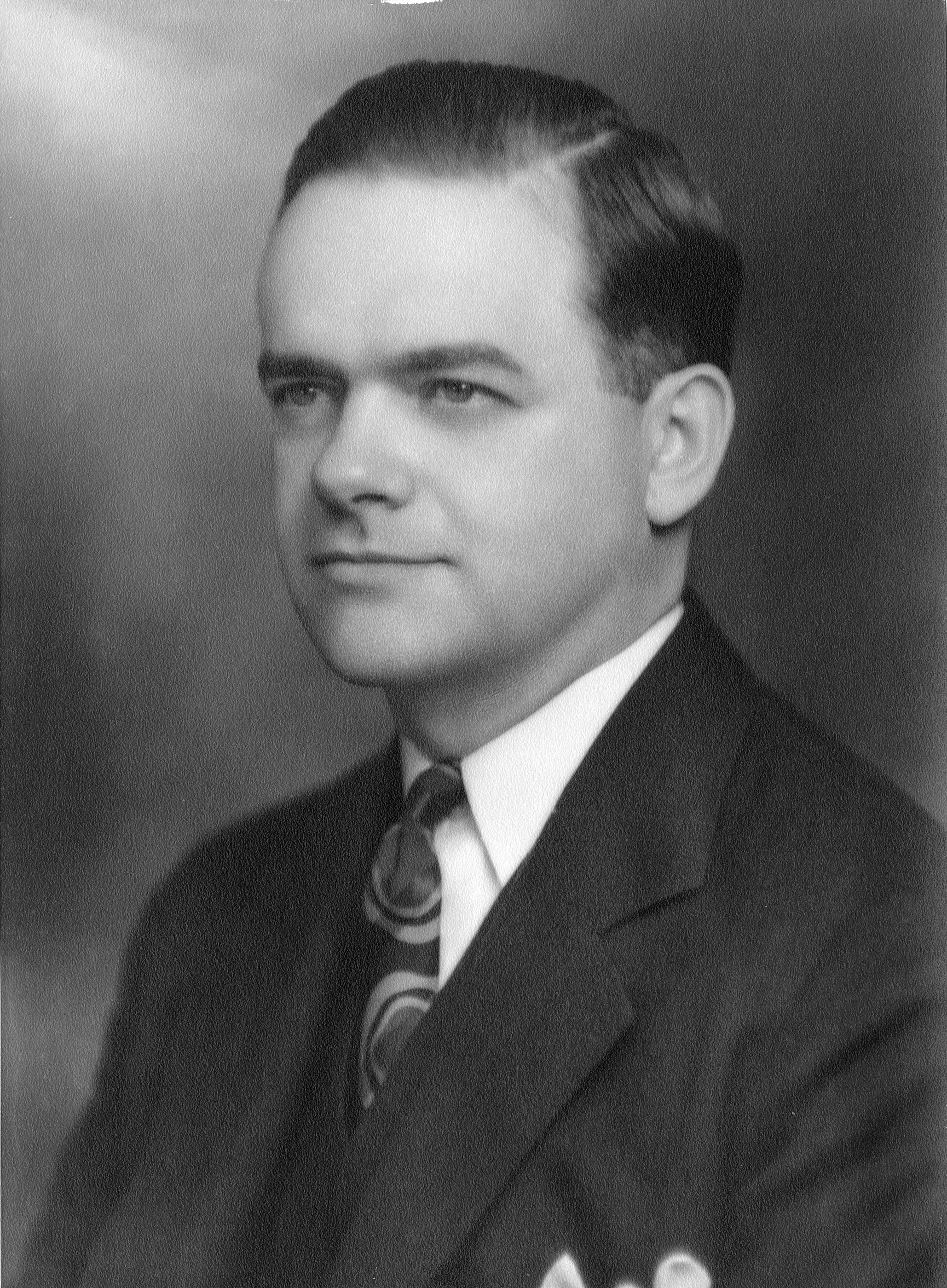

Nominee	Richard R. Nacy	A. H. Steinbeck
Party	Democratic	Republican
Popular vote	999,552	595,620
Percentage	62.20%	37.06%
State Treasurer before election
Larry Brunk
Republican
Elected State Treasurer
Richard R. Nacy
Democratic

The 1932 Missouri State Treasurer election was held on November 8, 1932, in order to elect the state treasurer of Missouri. Democratic nominee Richard R. Nacy defeated Republican nominee A. H. Steinbeck and Socialist nominee Barnett Cohen.

== General election ==
On election day, November 8, 1932, Democratic nominee Richard R. Nacy won the election by a margin of 403,932 votes against his foremost opponent Republican nominee A. H. Steinbeck, thereby gaining Democratic control over the office of state treasurer. Nacy was sworn in as the 28th state treasurer of Missouri on January 9, 1933.

=== Results ===
Missouri State Treasurer election, 1932
Party	Candidate	Votes	%
Democratic	Richard R. Nacy	999,552	62.20
Republican	A. H. Steinbeck	595,620	37.06
Socialist	Barnett Cohen	11,923	0.74
Total votes		1,607,095	100.00
Democratic gain from Republican			

== See also ==
- 1932 Missouri gubernatorial election
