= 1940 Missouri State Treasurer election =

- November 5, 1940
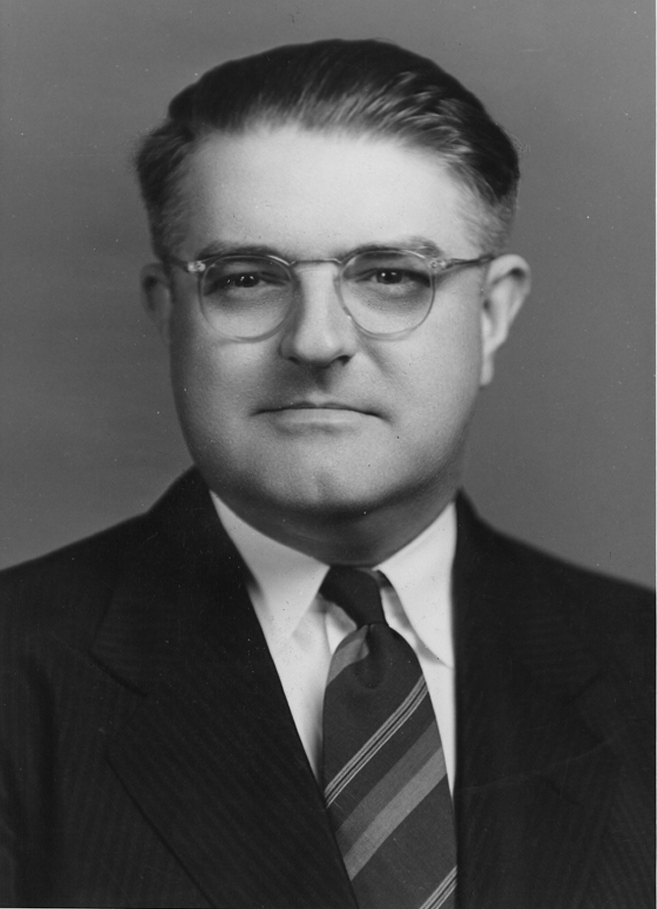

Nominee	Wilson Bell	Scott Peters
Party	Democratic	Republican
Popular vote	953,047	859,661
Percentage	52.53%	47.38%
State Treasurer before election
Robert W. Winn
Democratic
Elected State Treasurer
Wilson Bell
Democratic

The 1940 Missouri State Treasurer election was held on November 5, 1940, in order to elect the state treasurer of Missouri. Democratic nominee Wilson Bell defeated Republican nominee Scott Peters and Socialist nominee Lucy Henschel.

== General election ==
On election day, November 5, 1940, Democratic nominee Wilson Bell won the election by a margin of 93,386 votes against his foremost opponent Republican nominee Scott Peters, thereby retaining Democratic control over the office of state treasurer. Bell was sworn in as the 30th state treasurer of Missouri on January 13, 1941.

=== Results ===
Missouri State Treasurer election, 1940
Party	Candidate	Votes	%
Democratic	Wilson Bell	953,047	52.53
Republican	Scott Peters	859,661	47.38
Socialist	Lucy Henschel	1,627	0.09
Total votes		1,814,335	100.00
Democratic hold			

== See also ==
- 1940 Missouri gubernatorial election
