= 1968 Missouri State Treasurer election =

- November 5, 1968
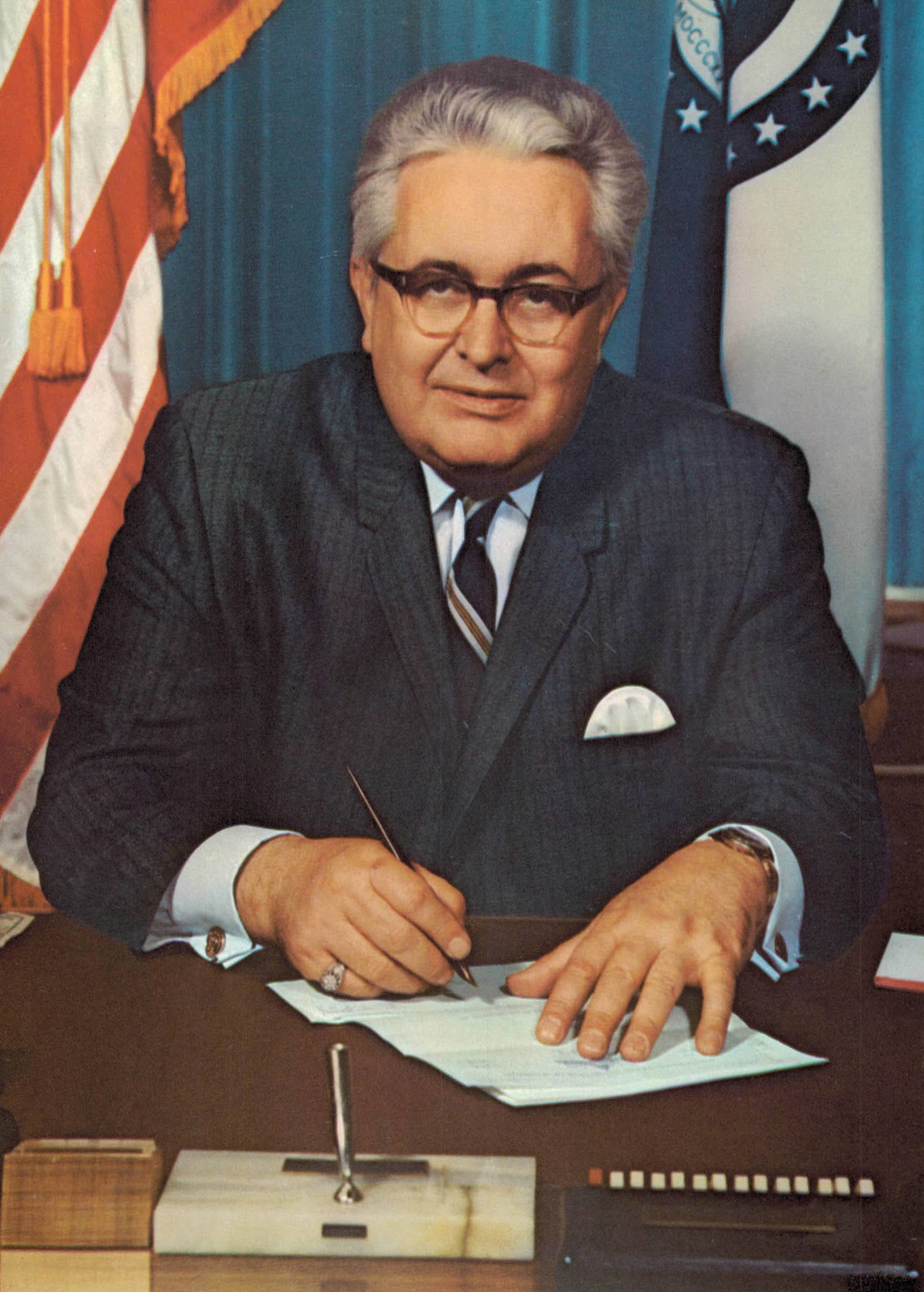

Nominee	William Edmond Robinson	William T. Zimmerman
Party	Democratic	Republican
Popular vote	932,733	757,265
Percentage	55.19%	44.81%
State Treasurer before election
Mount Etna Morris
Democratic
Elected State Treasurer
William Edmond Robinson
Democratic

The 1968 Missouri State Treasurer election was held on November 5, 1968, in order to elect the state treasurer of Missouri. Democratic nominee William Edmond Robinson defeated Republican nominee William T. Zimmerman.

== General election ==
On election day, November 5, 1968, Democratic nominee William Edmond Robinson won the election by a margin of 175,468 votes against his opponent Republican nominee William T. Zimmerman, thereby retaining Democratic control over the office of state treasurer. Robinson was sworn in as the 38th state treasurer of Missouri on January 13, 1969.

=== Results ===
Missouri State Treasurer election, 1968
Party	Candidate	Votes	%
Democratic	William Edmond Robinson	932,733	55.19
Republican	William T. Zimmerman	757,265	44.81
Total votes		1,689,998	100.00
Democratic hold			

== See also ==
- 1968 Missouri gubernatorial election
