= 1936 Missouri State Treasurer election =

- November 3, 1936
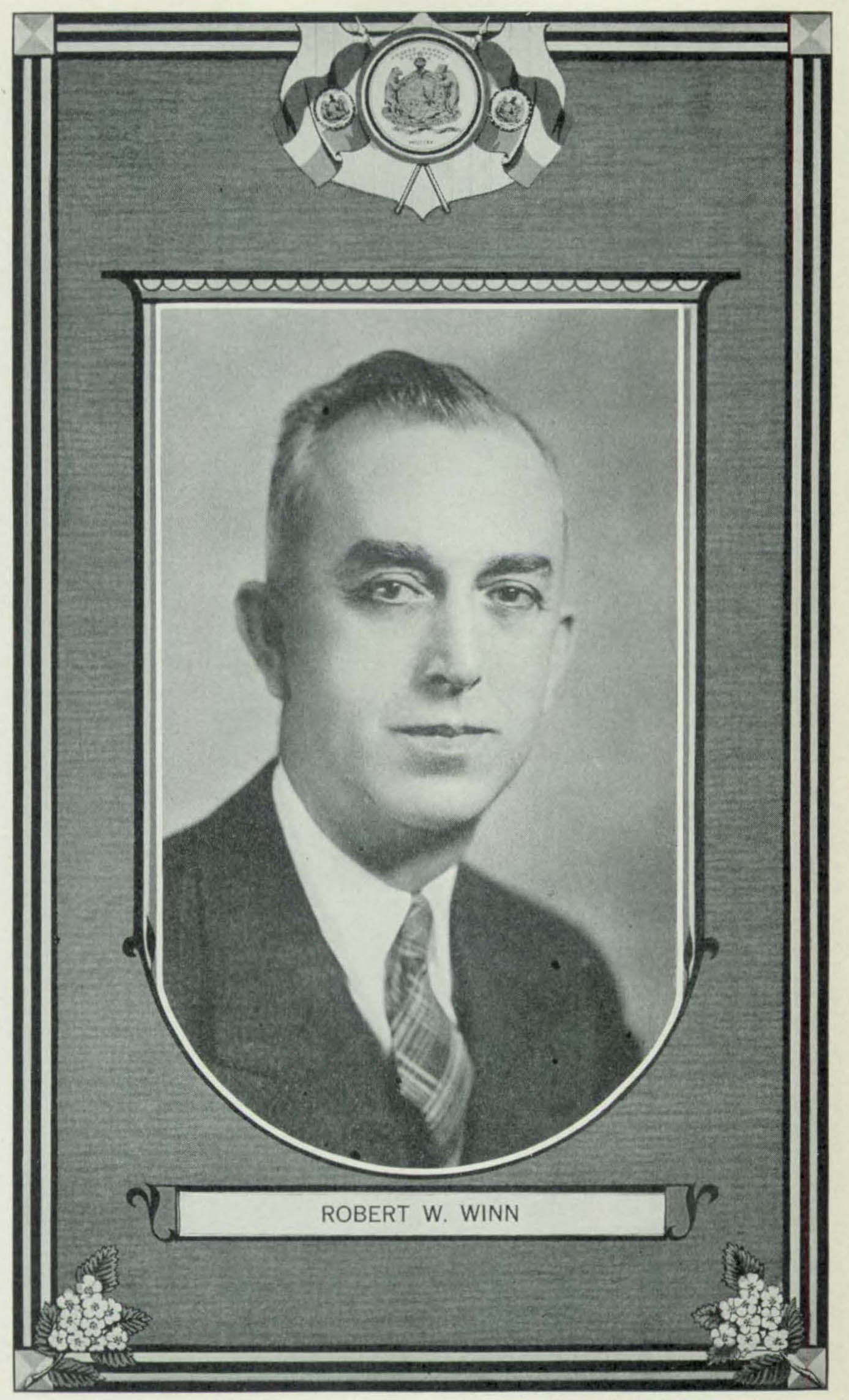

Nominee	Robert W. Winn	Arch D. Williams
Party	Democratic	Republican
Popular vote	1,089,470	715,098
Percentage	60.35%	39.61%
State Treasurer before election
Richard R. Nacy
Democratic
Elected State Treasurer
Robert W. Winn
Democratic

The 1936 Missouri State Treasurer election was held on November 3, 1936, in order to elect the state treasurer of Missouri. Democratic nominee Robert W. Winn defeated Republican nominee Arch D. Williams, Communist nominee Mary Lewis and Socialist Labor nominee Theodore Baeff.

== General election ==
On election day, November 3, 1936, Democratic nominee Robert W. Winn won the election by a margin of 374,372 votes against his foremost opponent Republican nominee Arch D. Williams, thereby retaining Democratic control over the office of state treasurer. Winn was sworn in as the 29th state treasurer of Missouri on January 11, 1937.

=== Results ===
Missouri State Treasurer election, 1936
Party	Candidate	Votes	%
Democratic	Robert W. Winn	1,089,470	60.35
Republican	Arch D. Williams	715,098	39.61
Communist	Mary Lewis	389	0.02
Socialist Labor	Theodore Baeff	374	0.02
Total votes		1,805,331	100.00
Democratic hold			

== See also ==
- 1936 Missouri gubernatorial election
