= 1944 Missouri State Treasurer election =

- November 7, 1944
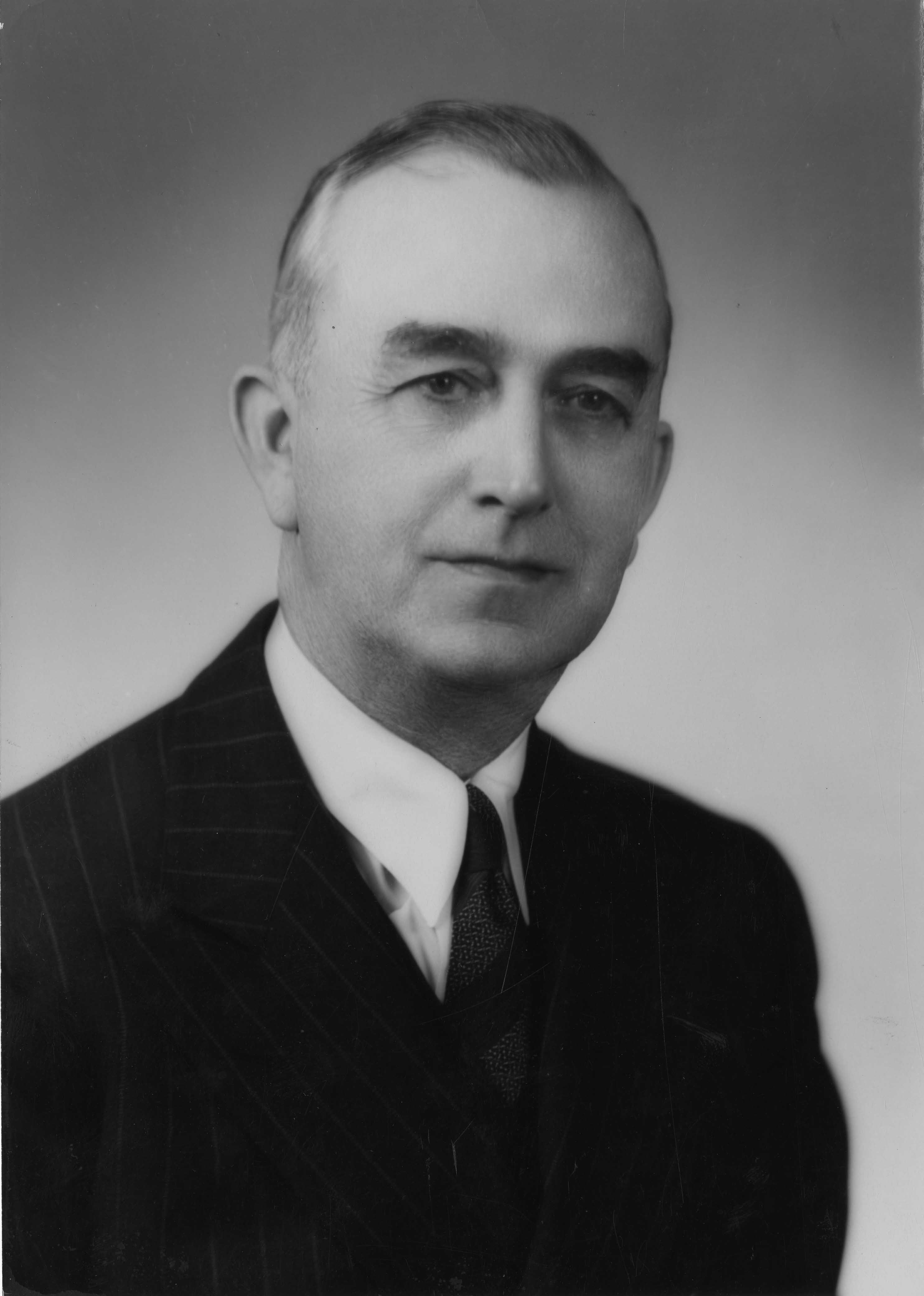

| Nominee | Robert W. Winn | Perry Compton |
| Party | Democratic | Republican |
| Popular vote | 788,657 | 759,880 |
| Percentage | 50.88% | 49.03% |
State Treasurer before election
Wilson Bell
Democratic
Elected State Treasurer
Robert W. Winn
Democratic

The 1944 Missouri State Treasurer election was held on November 7, 1944, in order to elect the state treasurer of Missouri. Democratic nominee and former state treasurer Robert W. Winn defeated Republican nominee Perry Compton, Socialist nominee Joseph G. Hodges and Socialist Labor nominee Norman Kochendorfer.

== General election ==
On election day, November 7, 1944, Democratic nominee Robert W. Winn won the election by a margin of 28,777 votes against his foremost opponent Republican nominee Perry Compton, thereby retaining Democratic control over the office of state treasurer. Winn was sworn in for his second non-consecutive term on January 8, 1945.

=== Results ===
Missouri State Treasurer election, 1944
| Party | Candidate | Votes | % |
|---|---|---|---|
| Democratic | Robert W. Winn | 788,657 | 50.88 |
| Republican | Perry Compton | 759,880 | 49.03 |
| Socialist | Joseph G. Hodges | 1,157 | 0.08 |
| Socialist Labor | Norman Kochendorfer | 221 | 0.01 |
| Total votes | | 1,549,915 | 100.00 |
| Democratic hold | | | |

== See also ==
- 1944 Missouri gubernatorial election
