= 1944 Missouri Secretary of State election =

- November 7, 1944

Nominee	Wilson Bell	Loyd Miller
Party	Democratic	Republican
Popular vote	805,846	745,521
Percentage	51.87%	47.99%
Secretary of State before election
Gregory C. Stockard (Acting)
Republican
Elected Secretary of State
Wilson Bell
Democratic

The 1944 Missouri Secretary of State election was held on November 7, 1944, in order to elect the secretary of state of Missouri. Democratic nominee and incumbent State Treasurer of Missouri Wilson Bell defeated Republican nominee Loyd Miller, Socialist nominee Alice B. Verburg, Prohibition nominee F. H. Jackson and Socialist Labor nominee Theodore Baeff.

== General election ==
On election day, November 7, 1944, Democratic nominee Wilson Bell won the election by a margin of 60,325 votes against his foremost opponent Republican nominee Loyd Miller, thereby gaining Democratic control over the office of secretary of state. Bell was sworn in as the 27th secretary of state of Missouri on January 8, 1945.

=== Results ===
Missouri Secretary of State election, 1944
Party	Candidate	Votes	%
Democratic	Wilson Bell	805,846	51.87
Republican	Loyd Miller	745,521	47.99
Socialist	Alice B. Verburg	1,252	0.08
Prohibition	F. H. Jackson	738	0.05
Socialist Labor	Theodore Baeff	211	0.01
Total votes		1,553,568	100.00
Democratic gain from Republican			

== See also ==
- 1944 Missouri gubernatorial election
