= 1980 Missouri State Treasurer election =

- November 4, 1980
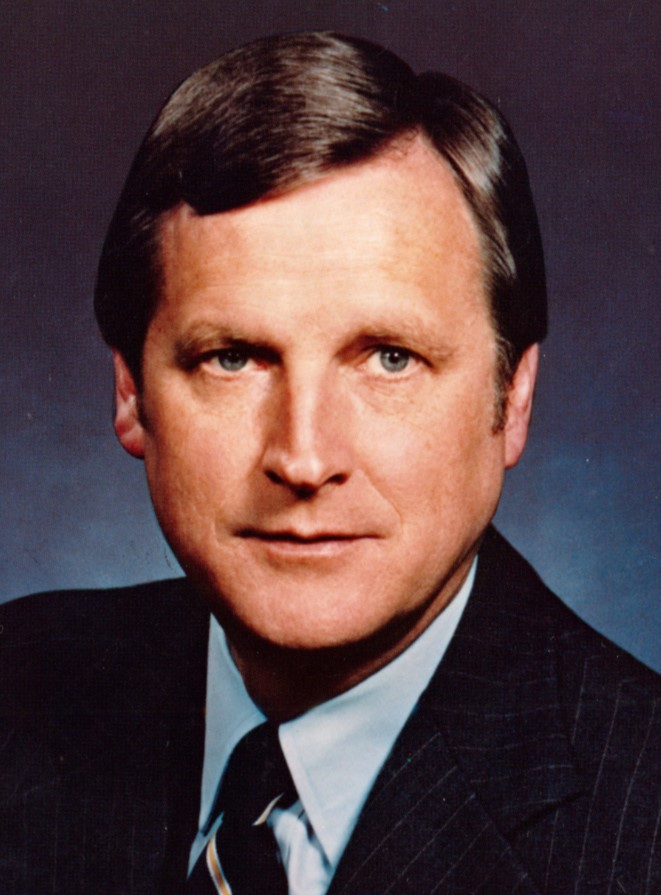

Nominee	Mel Carnahan	Gerald E. Winship
Party	Democratic	Republican
Popular vote	1,213,720	750,312
Percentage	61.80%	38.20%
- County results Carnahan: 50–60% 60–70% 70–80% 80–90% Winship: 50–60% 60–70%
State Treasurer before election
Jim Spainhower
Democratic
Elected State Treasurer
Mel Carnahan
Democratic

The 1980 Missouri State Treasurer election was held on November 4, 1980, in order to elect the state treasurer of Missouri. Democratic nominee and former member of the Missouri House of Representatives Mel Carnahan defeated Republican nominee Gerald E. Winship.

== General election ==
On election day, November 4, 1980, Democratic nominee Mel Carnahan won the election by a margin of 463,408 votes against his opponent Republican nominee Gerald E. Winship, thereby retaining Democratic control over the office of state treasurer. Carnahan was sworn in as the 40th state treasurer of Missouri on January 13, 1981.

=== Results ===
Missouri State Treasurer election, 1980
Party	Candidate	Votes	%
Democratic	Mel Carnahan	1,213,720	61.80
Republican	Gerald E. Winship	750,312	38.20
Total votes		1,964,032	100.00
Democratic hold			

== See also ==
- 1980 Missouri gubernatorial election
