= 1924 Missouri State Treasurer election =

- November 4, 1924
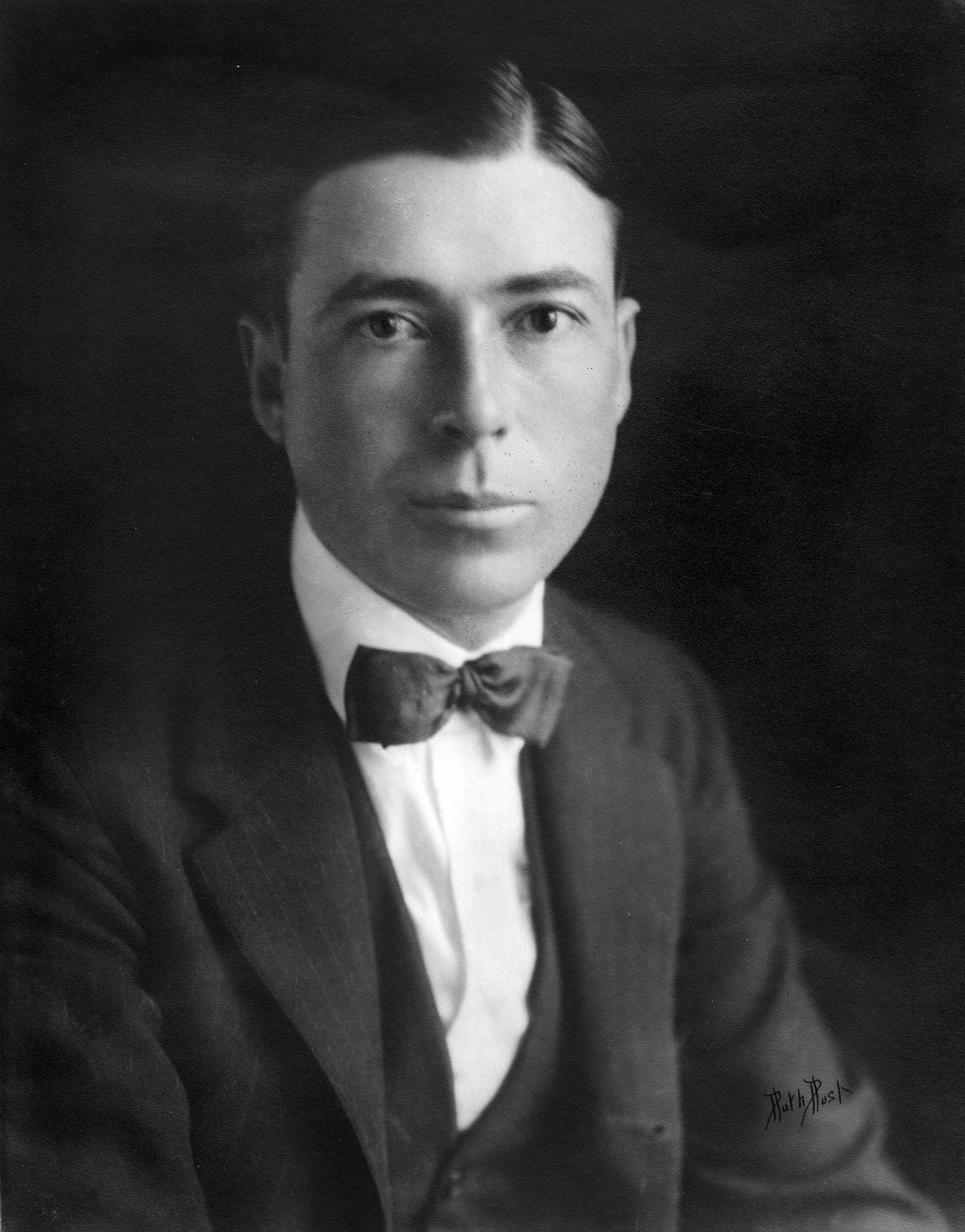

Nominee	C. Eugene Stephens	John H. Stone
Party	Republican	Democratic
Popular vote	654,071	607,911
Percentage	50.91%	47.32%
State Treasurer before election
Lorenzo Dow Thompson
Republican
Elected State Treasurer
C. Eugene Stephens
Republican

The 1924 Missouri State Treasurer election was held on November 4, 1924, in order to elect the state treasurer of Missouri. Republican nominee C. Eugene Stephens defeated Democratic nominee John H. Stone, Socialist nominee Edith E. Garver and Socialist Labor nominee John J. Ernst.

== General election ==
On election day, November 4, 1924, Republican nominee C. Eugene Stephens won the election by a margin of 46,160 votes against his foremost opponent Democratic nominee John H. Stone, thereby retaining Republican control over the office of state treasurer. Stephens was sworn in as the 26th state treasurer of Missouri on January 12, 1925.

=== Results ===
Missouri State Treasurer election, 1924
Party	Candidate	Votes	%
Republican	C. Eugene Stephens	654,071	50.91
Democratic	John H. Stone	607,911	47.32
Socialist	Edith E. Garver	22,213	1.73
Socialist Labor	John J. Ernst	624	0.04
Total votes		1,284,819	100.00
Republican hold			

== See also ==
- 1924 Missouri gubernatorial election
