= 1976 Missouri State Treasurer election =

- November 2, 1976
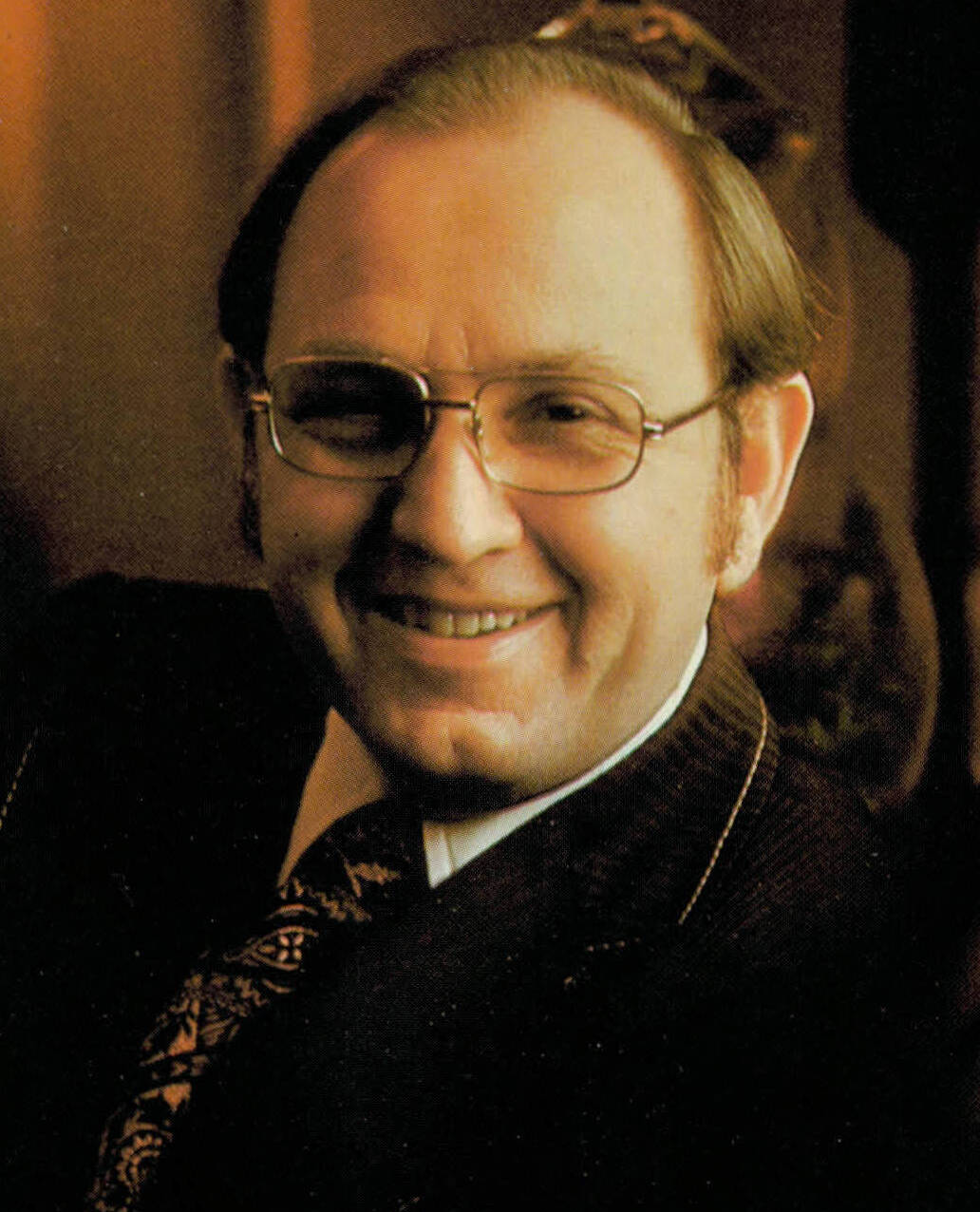

Nominee	Jim Spainhower	Albert L. Kemp Jr.
Party	Democratic	Republican
Popular vote	1,301,633	570,780
Percentage	69.52%	30.48%
State Treasurer before election
Jim Spainhower
Democratic
Elected State Treasurer
Jim Spainhower
Democratic

The 1976 Missouri State Treasurer election was held on November 2, 1976, in order to elect the state treasurer of Missouri. Democratic nominee and incumbent state treasurer Jim Spainhower defeated Republican nominee Albert L. Kemp Jr.

== General election ==
On election day, November 2, 1976, Democratic nominee Jim Spainhower won re-election by a margin of 730,853 votes against his opponent Republican nominee Albert L. Kemp Jr., thereby retaining Democratic control over the office of state treasurer. Spainhower was sworn in for his second term on January 11, 1977.

=== Results ===
Missouri State Treasurer election, 1976
Party	Candidate	Votes	%
Democratic	Jim Spainhower (incumbent)	1,301,633	69.52
Republican	Albert L. Kemp Jr.	570,780	30.48
Total votes		1,872,413	100.00
Democratic hold			

== See also ==
- 1976 Missouri gubernatorial election
