= Taxation in Missouri =

Taxation in Missouri primarily takes the form of income taxes, sales taxes, and property taxes. The Missouri Department of Revenue administers and collects the income and sales taxes, including local sales taxes, whereas property taxes are entirely administered by local jurisdictions. In addition to the aforementioned taxes, excise taxes are imposed on cigarettes and tobacco products, motor vehicle leases, and locally administered income taxes within the cities of Kansas City and St. Louis.

== Income tax ==
Missouri imposes an income tax, including an individual income tax, a corporate income tax, and a bank franchise tax. Kansas City and St. Louis impose their own "earnings taxes" on income.

=== Individual income tax ===
Most individuals who are residents of Missouri and have to file a federal income tax return are required to file a Missouri individual income tax return. Additionally, nonresidents of Missouri are required to file a Missouri individual income tax return if they have Missouri income of at least $600 in a year.

Missouri statutes identify the rate of tax:

Income	Rate
Not over $1,000.00	1 1/2%
Over $1,000 but not over $2,000	$15 plus 2% of excess over $1,000
Over $2,000 but not over $3,000	$35 plus 2 1/2% of excess over $2,000
Over $3,000 but not over $4,000	$60 plus 3% of excess over $3,000
Over $4,000 but not over $5,000	$90 plus 3 1/2% of excess over $4,000
Over $5,000 but not over $6,000	$125 plus 4% of excess over $5,000
Over $6,000 but not over $7,000	$165 plus 4 1/2% of excess over $6,000
Over $7,000 but not over $8,000	$210 plus 5% of excess over $7,000
Over $8,000 but not over $9,000	$260 plus 5 1/2% of excess over $8,000
Over $9,000	$315 plus 6% of excess over $9,000

=== Corporate income tax ===
Missouri imposes a tax on the income of corporations doing business in the state, at the rate of 6.25%.

=== Taxation of pass-through entities ===
Missouri does not impose an income tax on entities that have or elect for pass-through treatment under federal law. Consequently, partners of partnerships, members and managers of limited liability companies, and shareholders of S-corporations report their share of the partnership, limited liability company, or S-corporation's income.

=== Financial institutions tax ===
This is a tax for the privilege of operating a bank, consumer credit or loan business, savings and loan association, or credit union in Missouri. The tax rate is 7 percent of net income.

=== Earnings taxes ===
St. Louis and Kansas City are permitted to impose an Earnings Tax on all individuals and businesses doing business within their city limits. All other municipalities are prohibited from imposing a tax on income. The earnings tax is one percent of income for residents, and one percent of income earned inside the city for nonresidents who work inside the city.

== Sales tax ==
Missouri imposes a tax on all retail sales of tangible personal property and specified services. The state tax is four percent, plus one-eighth of one percent dedicated to the Department of Conservation and one-tenth of one percent dedicated to the Department of Natural Resources. The state tax on food however, is one percent. (Food is still subject to the Department of Conservation and Department of Natural Resources sales taxes, as well as local sales taxes.) Missouri also imposes a use tax on tangible personal property that is stored, used, or consumed in Missouri but not subject to the sales tax.

In addition to the state sales tax rate, counties, cities, and other political subdivisions are permitted to impose their own sales taxes. Counties and cities are also permitted to impose a use tax, although many do not. Consequently, in most parts of the state the sales tax rate is higher than the use tax rate.

=== Motor vehicles ===
Until 2013, Missouri imposed a Highway Use Tax on all motor vehicles titled in Missouri but not bought in Missouri. As a result of litigation over the proper local tax to impose on such motor vehicles – sales tax or use tax – the General Assembly amended the sales tax statute so that sales tax is imposed on the privilege of titling new and used motor vehicles. Furthermore, motor vehicle leasing companies may elect to collect use tax on their lease receipts as opposed to pay sales tax when titling the vehicle in Missouri.

=== Tobacco taxes ===
Missouri imposes a tax on the sale of cigarettes paid by the wholesaler and passed on to the final purchaser. The tax rate is 8 1/2 mills per cigarette or 17 cents per pack of 20. St. Louis County and Jackson County also impose their own cigarette taxes. The tax rate is 2 1/2 mills per cigarette or 5 cents per pack of 20.

Missouri also imposes a tax upon the first sale of tobacco products, other than cigarettes, within the state. The tax rate is 10 percent of the manufacturer's invoice price.

=== Local option sales taxes ===
Local jurisdictions may adopt local option sales taxes like the Missouri Economic Development Sales Tax.

==== Economic development sales tax ====
Missouri law authorizes counties and municipalities to impose a dedicated economic development sales tax to fund public improvements and activities intended to promote economic growth. The tax is authorized primarily under Missouri Revised Statutes 67.1300 and Missouri Revised Statutes 67.1305, which allow local governments to levy a voter-approved sales tax of up to 1% (municipalities) or 0.5% (counties).

Revenues are deposited into a dedicated economic development sales tax trust fund and must be used only for purposes defined in statute, such as land acquisition, site preparation, industrial park infrastructure, utility extensions, and workforce development programs. Under § 67.1305, at least 20% of annual revenue must support long-term economic development preparation, and no more than 25% may be used for administrative costs.

Several Missouri municipalities have adopted the tax to support redevelopment and infrastructure projects. One widely cited example is the City of Hazelwood, which enacted a 0.5% economic development sales tax in 2007 following the closure of the Ford Hazelwood Assembly Plant.

== See also ==
- Taxation in the United States
- Missouri Department of Revenue
