= Milton Carpenter =

American politician (1905–1996)

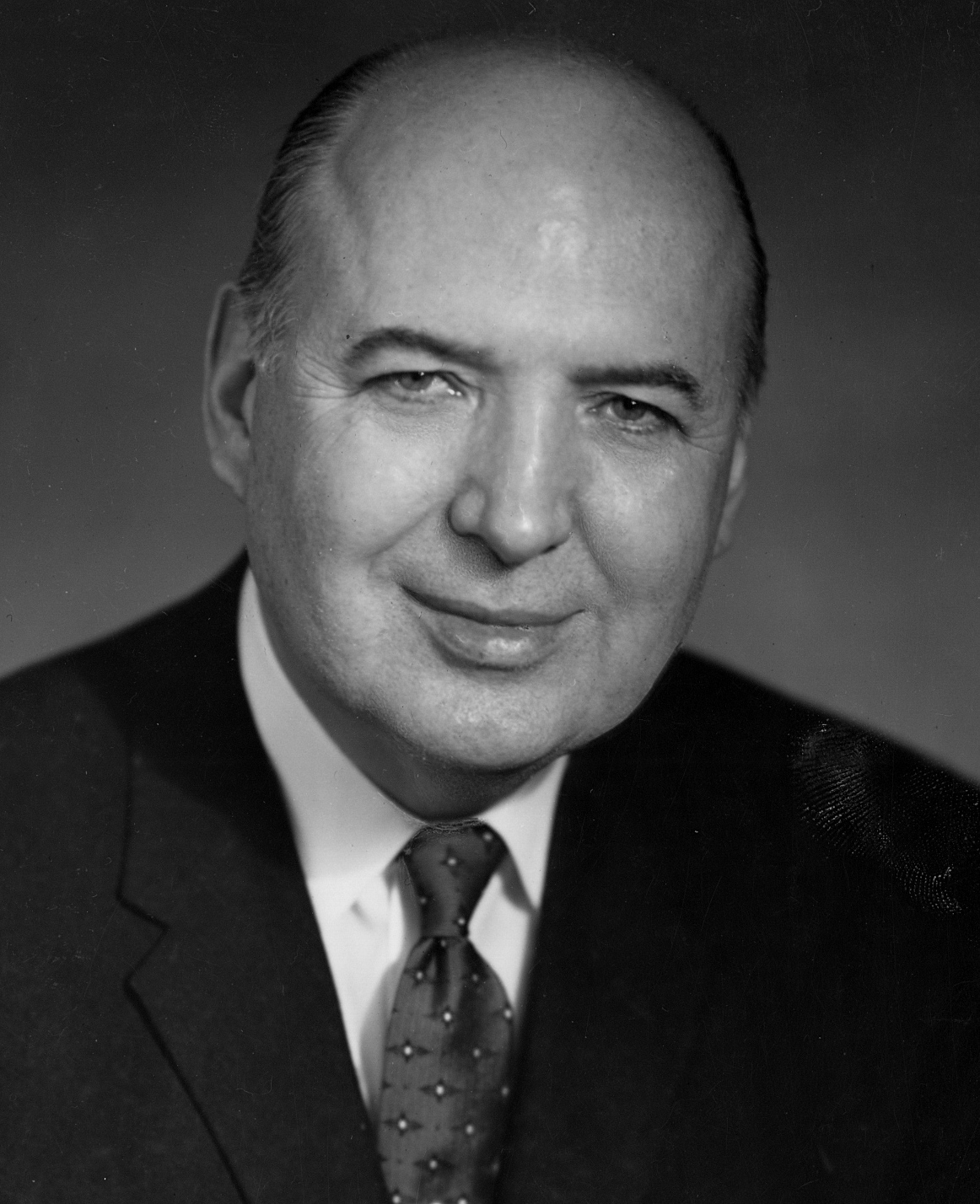
- Carpenter, c. 1961

36th State Treasurer of Missouri
- In office 1961–1965
- Governor: John M. Dalton
- Preceded by: Mount Etna Morris
- Succeeded by: Mount Etna Morris

Personal details
- Born: Milton D. Carpenter; March 4, 1905 St. Louis, Missouri, US
- Died: November 19, 1996 (aged 91) Maryland Heights, Missouri, US
- Party: Democratic
- Spouse: Janet Naomi Parham
- Relations: Donald L. Carpenter (brother)
- Education: Washington University in St. Louis

Military service
- Branch/service: United States Army
- Years of service: 1942–1945
- Battles/wars: World War II

Milton D. Carpenter (March 4, 1905 – November 19, 1996) was an American politician. He served as the State Treasurer of Missouri from 1961 to 1965.

== Early life and military service ==
Carpenter was born on March 4, 1905, in St. Louis. His father was waterworker Francis J. Carpenter (died 1968), and his brother was Donald L. Carpenter, who served in the Missouri House of Representatives. He attended Yeatman High School, then studied at Washington University in St. Louis. He later received honorary degrees from Concordia University and Valparaiso University. After graduation, he headed both a concrete company and a roofing company.

During World War II, Carpenter served in the United States Army for three years, being honorably discharged in July 1945. He was injured in battle, as he later joined the Disabled American Veterans. In 1961, the Jewish War Veterans of the United States of America named him 'Man of the Year'. Following his discharge, he worked as manager and treasurer of a scaffolding company.

== Politics and later life ==
A Democrat, Carpenter served as comptroller from 1949 to 1957. He was Director of the Missouri Department of Revenue, beginning his appointment by Governor James T. Blair Jr., on January 15, 1957. From 1961 to 1965, he was State Treasurer of Missouri, as which he earned $15,000 per year. As Treasurer, he modernized the office and made it more efficient in its duties.

After leaving office, Carpenter received $75,000 from Mercantile Trust Co., which was sent to a firm owned solely by Carpenter. According to the St. Louis Post-Dispatch, he "did little work" to earn it, so he was investigated by the Internal Revenue Service and brought to trial in May 1975.

In 1968, Carpenter entered the Democratic primaries to the United States House of Representatives from Missouri's 1st congressional district. His bid was considered "surprising" by the Jefferson City Post-Tribune, as the 1st district favored African American voters at the time. He was called the "favorite to gain the nomination" by the St. Louis Post-Dispatch, due to support from white Democrats, though he lost to Bill Clay.

Carpenter was Jewish. He married Janet Naomi Parham in 1942. He died on November 19, 1996, aged 91, in Maryland Heights.

Party political offices
Preceded by Mount Etna Morris	Democratic nominee for State Treasurer of Missouri; 1960	Succeeded by Mount Etna Morris
Political offices
Preceded by Mount Etna Morris	State Treasurer of Missouri; 1961–1965	Succeeded by Mount Etna Morris
