= George Hubert Bates =

American politician (1884–1978)

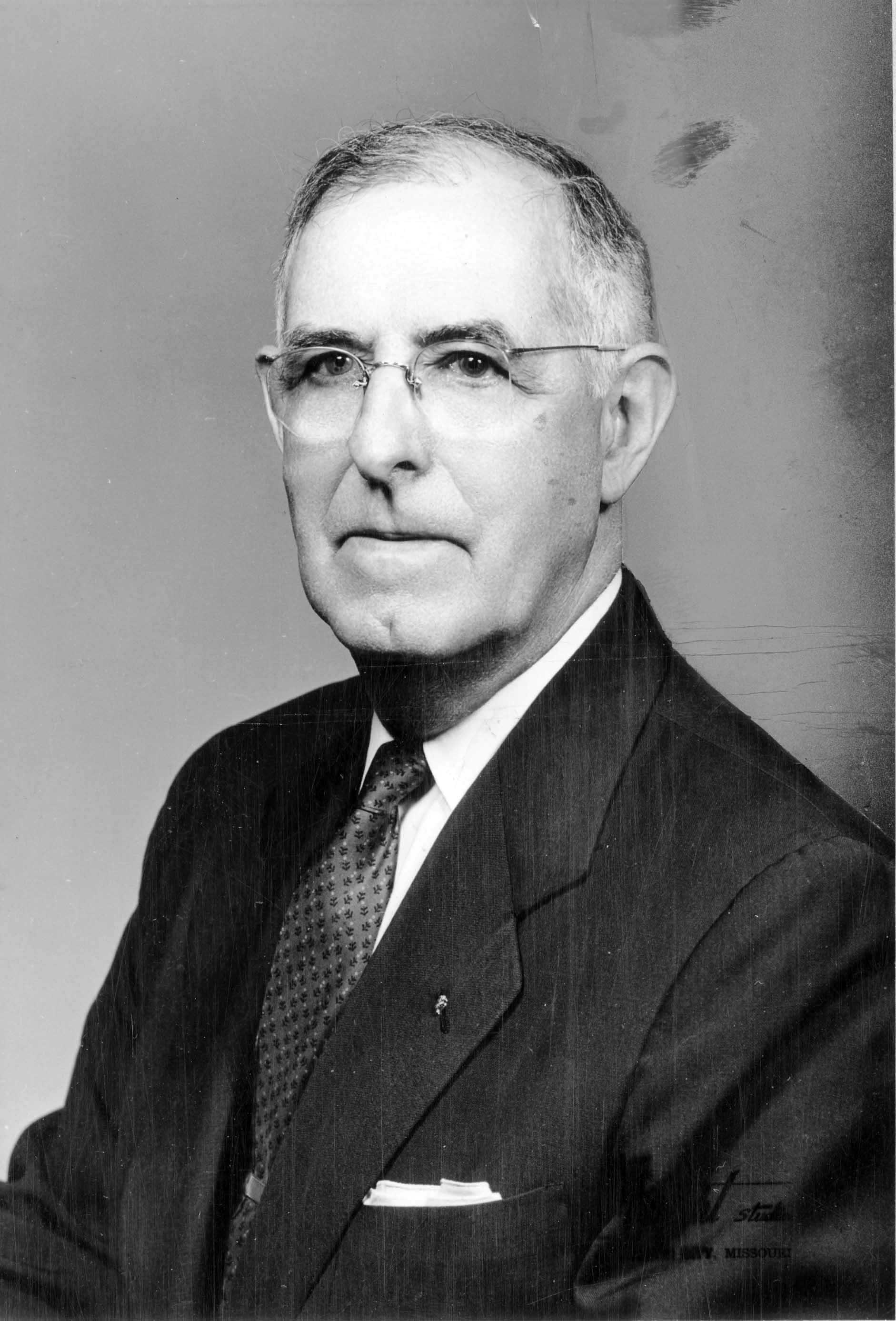
- Bates, c. 1955

State Treasurer of Missouri
- In office 1953–1957
- Governor: Phil M. Donnelly
- Preceded by: Mount Etna Morris
- Succeeded by: Mount Etna Morris

Personal details
- Born: December 8, 1884 Bates City, Missouri, US
- Died: July 22, 1978 (aged 93) Jefferson City, Missouri, US
- Party: Democratic

George Hubert Bates (December 8, 1884 – July 22, 1978) was an American politician. He served as the State Treasurer of Missouri from 1953 to 1957.

== Biography ==
Bates was born on December 8, 1884, in Bates City, Missouri, to George Washington Bates and Jemima (née Griffith) Bates. Of English and German descent, his grandfather Theodore founded the city and is its namesake. He graduated Lexington High School in 1903, then studied at the University of Missouri. He entered the banking industry in 1905, as an employee of the Commercial Bank of Lexington. From January 1, 1915 to 1931, he served as Deputy Clerk of Lafayette County, succeeding his father as such. During World War I, he was clerk of the Missouri draft board. In 1931, he was hired as a cashier to Lexington's Traders Bank.

Bates moved to Jefferson City in January 1933. A Democrat, he served under State Auditor Forrest Smith as a clerk. While with the State Auditor's office, he headed its department for sales tax, following the establishment of the tax in Missouri, in 1934. He transferred to the Missouri Department of Revenue following its creation in 1946. With the Department of Revenue, Governor Phil M. Donnelly named him collector in 1946, then in 1949, Forrest Smith – now serving as Governor – appointed him acting director. He served as State Treasurer of Missouri from 1953 to 1957, for which he earned $7,500 per year. From 1957 to until his retirement in 1961, he became Missouri Commissioner of Finance.

On June 18, 1913, Bates married educator Ernestine Norma Comer, with whom he had three children. He died on July 22, 1978, aged 93, in Jefferson City. He is buried in Riverview Cemetery, in Jefferson City. On July 31, he was honored by Ike Skelton in the United States House of Representatives; the two had met previously, as Bates was friends with Skelton's father.

Political offices
Preceded by Mount Etna Morris	State Treasurer of Missouri; 1953–1957	Succeeded by Mount Etna Morris
Party political offices
Preceded by Mount Etna Morris	Democratic nominee for State Treasurer of Missouri; 1952	Succeeded by Mount Etna Morris
