= William Edmond Robinson =

American politician (1920–1992)

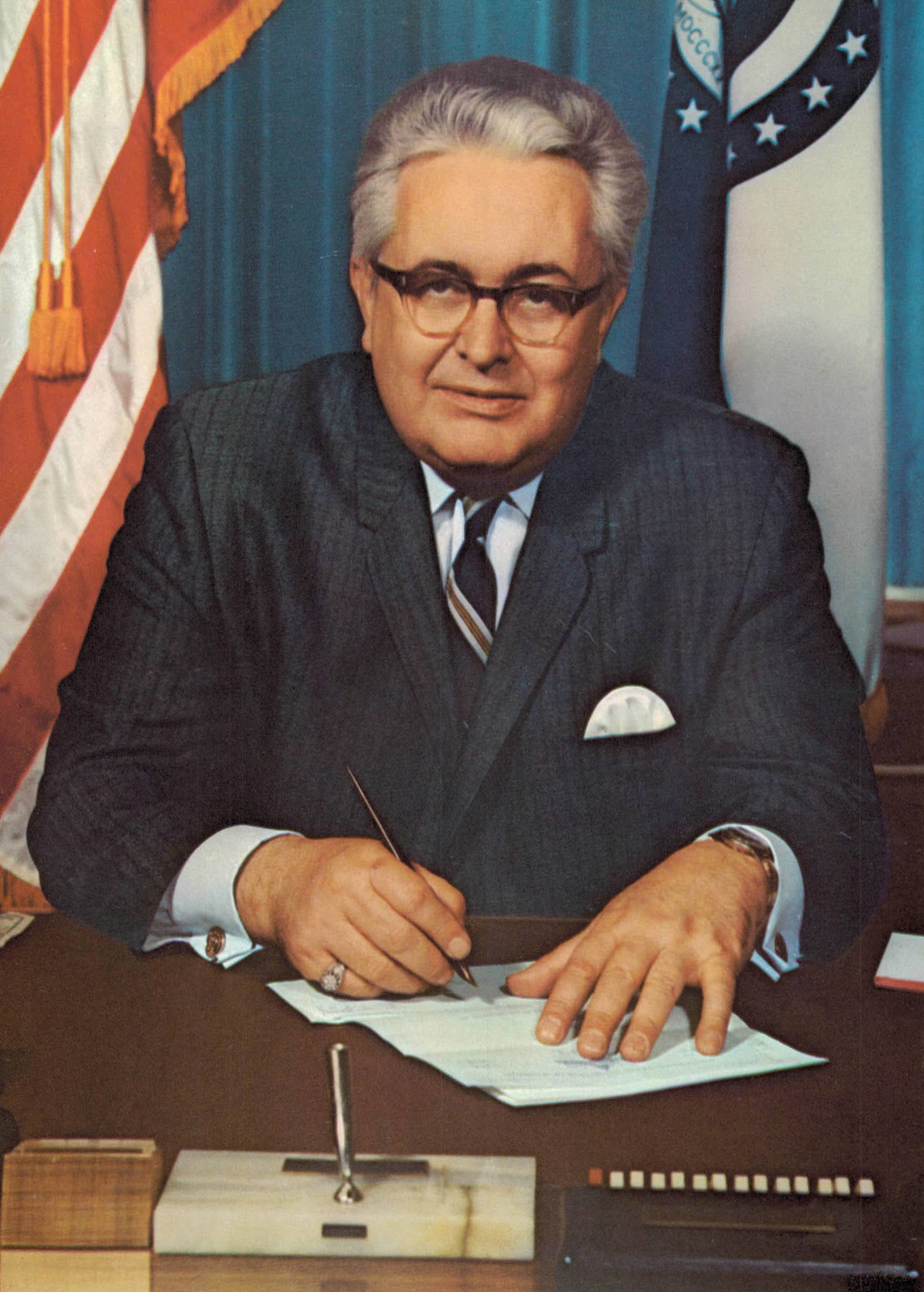

38th State Treasurer of Missouri
- In office January 1969 – January 1973
- Governor: Warren E. Hearnes
- Preceded by: Mount Etna Morris
- Succeeded by: Jim Spainhower

Personal details
- Born: June 1, 1920 St. Francois County, Missouri, United States
- Died: October 16, 1992 (aged 72)
- Party: Democratic
- Spouse(s): Janet (Parham) Robinson; Angie (LeClair) Robinson
- Education: Central Methodist University
- Profession: Banking; Insurance

William Edmond Robinson (June 1, 1920 – October 16, 1992) was an American politician and banking executive from the state of Missouri. A Democrat, he served one term as Missouri State Treasurer from 1969 to 1973.

== Early life ==
Robinson was born in St. Francois County, Missouri on June 1, 1920. He grew up around Bonne Terre, Missouri and received his public education there. Following high school, Robinson attended Central Methodist College in Fayette, Missouri. He married Janet Naomi Parham of St. Louis in 1942. Later he married Angie LeClair.

== Working life and politics ==
Prior to being elected Missouri State Treasurer in November 1968 Robinson in the banking and insurance fields. He served as managing officer and secretary-treasurer of Bonne Terre Savings and Loan Association, as well as chairman of the board of the Missouri Savings and Loan League. Other private workforce experience includes being President and board member of Frontier-Tower Life Insurance of Jefferson City, Missouri. William Robinson served one term as state treasurer from January 1969 to January 1973. He died on October 16, 1992.

Party political offices
Preceded by Mount Etna Morris	Democratic nominee for State Treasurer of Missouri; 1968	Succeeded by Jim Spainhower
Political offices
Preceded by Mount Etna Morris	State Treasurer of Missouri; 1969–1973	Succeeded by Jim Spainhower
