= Missouri Department of Revenue =

Governmental organization in Missouri, US

Agency overview
- Jurisdiction: Missouri
- Headquarters: Harry S Truman State Office Building; 301 West High Street; Jefferson City, Missouri 65101
- Agency executive: Wayne Wallingford, Director
- Website: https://dor.mo.gov/

The Missouri Department of Revenue is a U.S. state government agency in Missouri created under the Missouri Constitution in 1945, which is responsible for ensuring the proper functioning of state and local government through the collection and distribution of state revenue, and administration of state laws governing driver licensing, and motor vehicle sale and registration. Mount Etna Morris served as the department's first director from July 1946 until his election as State Treasurer of Missouri in November 1948, and later served again as director from 1953 to 1956. The current director, Wayne Wallingford, was named by Governor Mike Parson on December 29, 2021.

== Organization ==
- Director of Revenue
  - Office of the Director
    - Deputy Director
    - Legislative Liaison
    - Director of Communications
  - Administration Division is responsible for providing human resources, payroll, procurement, and related services for the Department
    - Financial & General Services Bureau
    - Personnel Services Bureau
  - Legal Services Division provides legal services for the Director and all Divisions of the Department, and investigates criminal violations of state revenue/motor vehicle laws
    - General Counsel's Office
    - Criminal Tax Investigation Bureau
    - Compliance and Investigation Bureau
  - Motor Vehicle and Driver Licensing Division issues, suspends and revokes drivers licenses, and titles motor vehicles
    - Driver Licensing Bureau
    - License Offices Bureau
    - Motor Vehicle Bureau
  - Taxation Division is responsible for administering the state's tax laws. Its processes more than 5 million tax returns annually, responds to taxpayer inquiries, and audits taxpayers for compliance with state tax laws
    - Business Tax Bureau
    - Personal Tax Bureau
    - Collections and Taxpayer Assistance Bureau
    - Field Compliance Bureau
- State Lottery Commission supervises the Missouri State Lottery
- State Tax Commission is responsible for ensuring equal property tax assessments and providing a neutral forum for resolving property tax disputes

== See also ==
- Taxation in Missouri
