= Larry Brunk =

American politician (1883–1956)

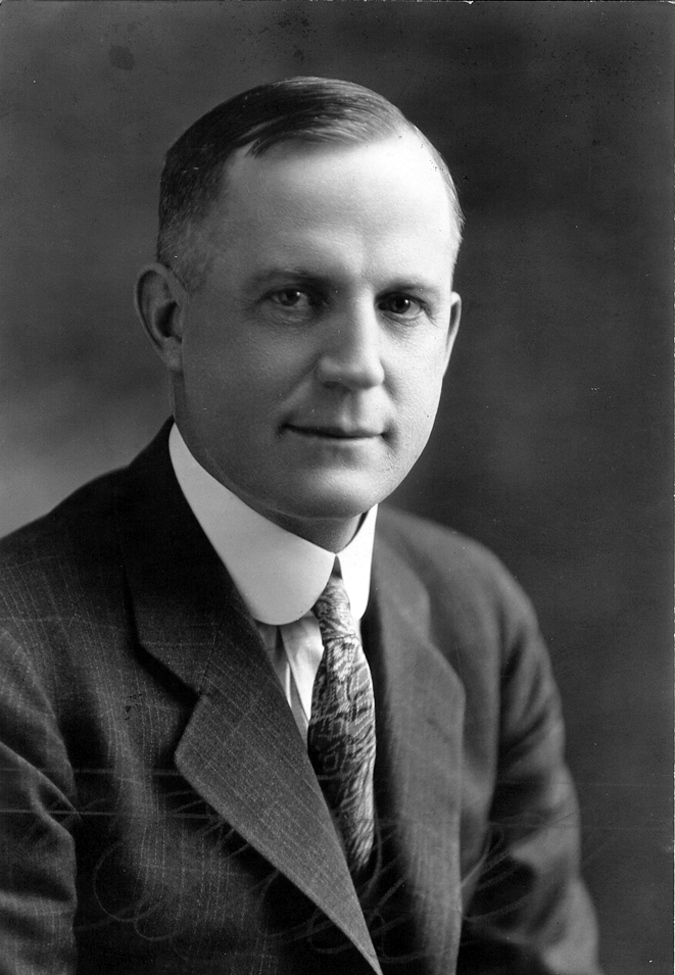
- Brunk, c. 1929

State Treasurer of Missouri
- In office 1929–1933
- Preceded by: C. Eugene Stephens
- Succeeded by: Richard R. Nacy

Member of the Missouri Senate from the 18th district
- In office 1922–1926

Personal details
- Born: February 9, 1883 Franklin County, Missouri, US
- Died: November 22, 1956 (aged 73) Aurora, Missouri, US
- Party: Republican

Larry Brunk (February 9, 1883 – November 22, 1956) was an American politician. He served as the State Treasurer of Missouri from 1929 to 1933. He faced impeachment in 1931, though the Missouri Senate voted against it.

== Biography ==
Brunk was born on February 9, 1883, in Franklin County, Missouri, to Henry Brunk and Martha (née Hamilton) Brunk. He was educated in Aurora public schools. He began working as a miner in his childhood, becoming a foreman, then acquiring stakes in mines.

A Republican, Brunk served as mayor of Aurora for four terms, beginning in 1910. He represented the 18th district in the Missouri Senate from 1922 to 1926. After serving as senator, Governor Sam Aaron Baker appointed him as the Missouri Department of Corrections' purchasing agent. He was then named the Missouri Public Service Commission, serving for 13 months, then the secretary of the Missouri Workmen's Compensation Commission. From 1929 to 1933, he served as State Treasurer of Missouri, earning $3,000 per year.

In early 1930, Brunk was charged with counts of corruption, mishandling state funds, neglegence, and offering bribes, among other crimes. Governor Henry S. Caulfield attempted to remove Brunk from his office, but Brunk challenged his removal, arguing that under the 1875 Constitution of Missouri, one can only be removed from office via impeachment. The Supreme Court of Missouri ruled in his favor, and Brunk was instead suspended on May 18, 1931, while his impeachment proceedings were underway. The Missouri House of Representatives voted in favor of impeching him, though the Senate voted against, so Brunk was unsuspended and he served the remainder lf his term.

After serving as Treasurer, Brunk worked with vehicles in Jefferson City. In 1937, he returned to Aurora and again involved himself in mining. He later served as a police judge. He married Anna Urschel on February 1, 1918; they had one child together. He died on November 22, 1956, aged 73, in Aurora, from gallbladder cancer. He is buried in Maple Park Cemetery, in Aurora.

Party political offices
Preceded by C. Eugene Stephens	Republican nominee for State Treasurer of Missouri; 1928	Succeeded by A. H. Steinbeck
Political offices
Preceded by C. Eugene Stephens	State Treasurer of Missouri; 1929–1933	Succeeded by Richard R. Nacy
