= C. Eugene Stephens =

American politician (1889–1970)

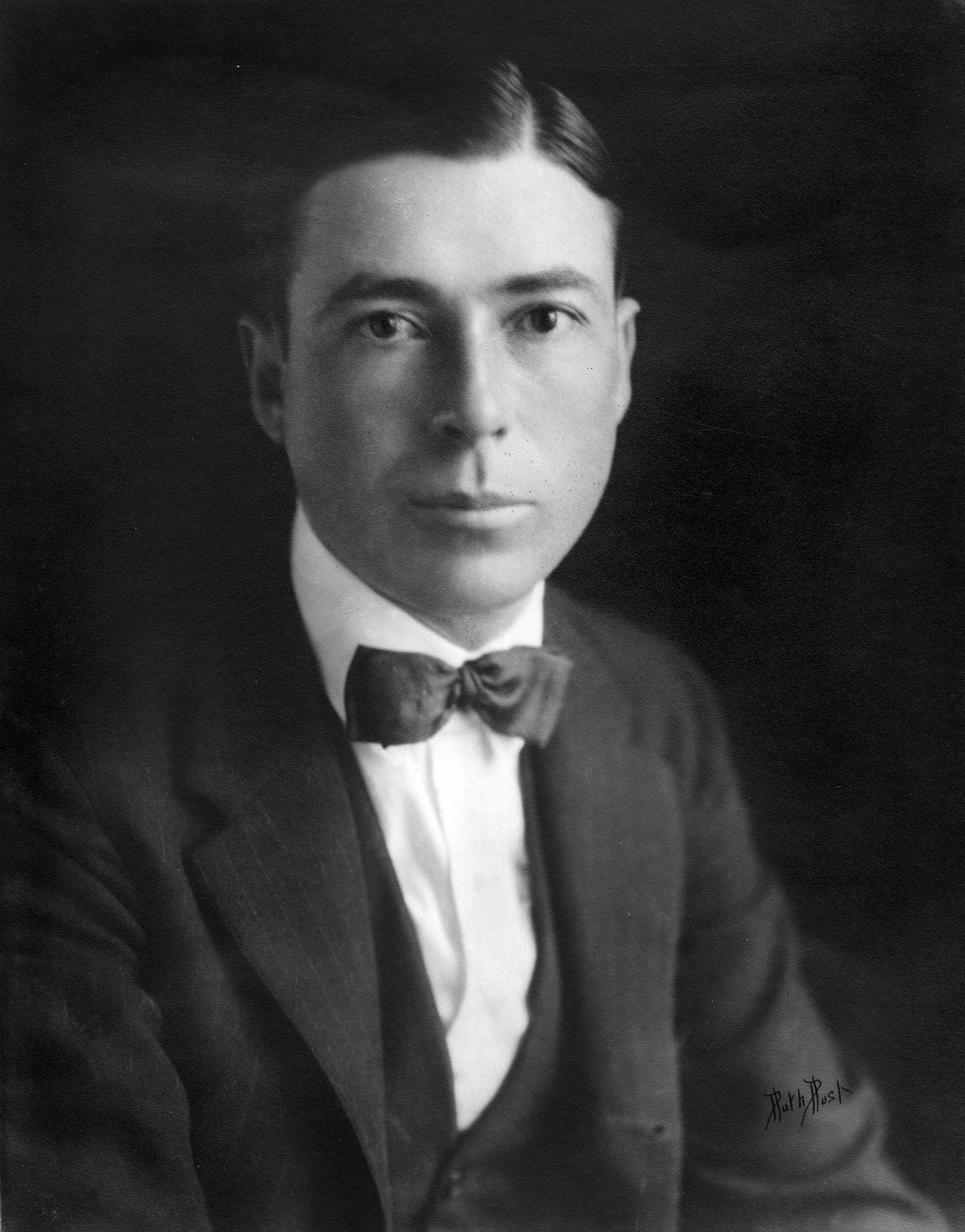
- Stephens, c. 1925

State Treasurer of Missouri
- In office 1925 – December 1928
- Preceded by: Lorenzo Dow Thompson
- Succeeded by: Larry Brunk

Personal details
- Born: December 20, 1889 Kirksville, Missouri, US
- Died: June 25, 1970 (aged 80) Jefferson City, Missouri, US
- Party: Republican
- Occupation: Politician

C. Eugene Stephens (December 20, 1889 – June 25, 1970) was an American politician. He served as the State Treasurer of Missouri from 1925 to 1929.

== Biography ==
Stephens was born on December 20, 1889, in Kirksville, Missouri, to Mortimer Stephens and Ella (née Deaton) Stephens. He lived on a farm there until 1900, when he and his family moved to Maplewood. After receiving his education at public schools, he worked as a bank clerk. From 1915 to 1917, he was clerk for St. Louis County. He then was chief clerk for State Auditor of Missouri George E. Hackmann in 1917; and Secretary of State of Missouri Charles U. Becker in 1921. He later sued Becker in 1928 for $125,000, after Becker approached the St. Louis Globe-Democrat, seeking to have an article saying Stephens' administration as treasurer was unable to account for $500,000 of gasoline tax.

A Republican, Stephens was elected State Treasurer of Missouri on November 4, 1924. He served from 1925 to December 1928 and was paid $3,000 per year. Elected at age 34, he was the youngest person elected State Treasurer. Stephens unsuccessfully ran for State Secretary in 1928. In 1930, he was investigated, as Henry S. Caulfield alleged that funds had gone unaccounted for during his tenure as Treasurer.

After serving, Stephens involved himself with the gas industry of the Kansas City metropolitan area; he previously engaged in the industry at a state level, employing a gas tax clerk while Treasurer. On January 13, 1931, he crashed his car into a ditch on U.S. Route 66, near Waynesville, breaking his leg and three ribs, as well as injuring his scalp.

On December 29, 1911 or 1912, Stephens married Mary Ann Wilson, with whom he had two children. He was Baptist. He died on June 25, 1970, aged 80, in Jefferson City. He is buried in Ironton.

Party political offices
Preceded by Lorenzo Dow Thompson	Republican nominee for State Treasurer of Missouri; 1924	Succeeded by Larry Brunk
Political offices
Preceded by Lorenzo Dow Thompson	State Treasurer of Missouri; 1925–1929	Succeeded by Larry Brunk
