= Wilson Bell =

American politician (1897–1947)

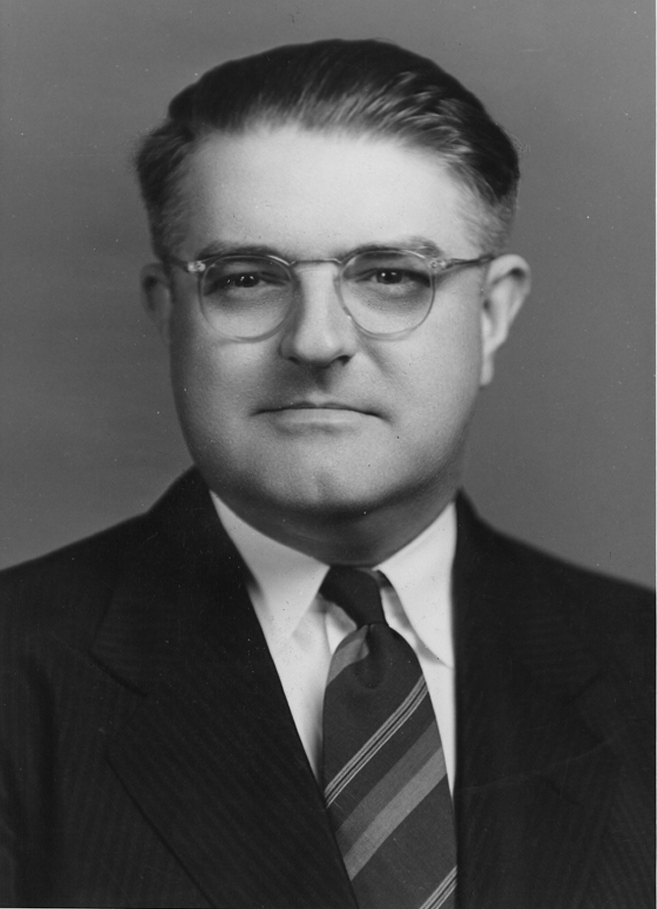
- Bell, c. 1941

State Treasurer of Missouri
- In office 1941–1945
- Preceded by: Robert W. Winn
- Succeeded by: Robert W. Winn

Secretary of State of Missouri
- In office 1945 – May 20, 1947
- Preceded by: Gregory C. Stockard
- Succeeded by: Edgar C. Nelson

Personal details
- Born: May 24, 1897 Potosi, Missouri, US
- Died: May 20, 1947 (aged 49) Jefferson City, Missouri, US
- Party: Democratic

Military service
- Branch/service: United States Army
- Battles/wars: World War I

Wilson Bell (May 24, 1897 – May 20, 1947) was an American politician. He served as the State Treasurer of Missouri from 1941 to 1945, and as Secretary of State of Missouri from 1945 until his death 1947.

== Biography ==
Bell was born on May 24, 1897, in Potosi, Missouri, to Henry Bell and Mamie (née Crane) Bell. His father was a newspaperman, and Bell succeeded his father as publisher of the Independent-Journal. He studied at the University of Missouri. He served in the United States Army during World War I. An obituary described him as "stocky" and "keen-eyed".

From 1924 to 1932, Bell served as Treasurer of Washington County. He then worked as treasurer of the Missouri Press Association from 1932 to 1940. A Democrat, he served as State Treasurer of Missouri from 1941 to 1945, a position he earned an annual $7,500 for. He then served as Secretary of State of Missouri from 1945, until his death in office, in 1947. Following his death, Governor Phil M. Donnelly enacted a law allowing the Governor to act as Secretary of State until a replacement could be found; his replacement was Robert W. Winn, who had also nonconsecutively served before Bell.

In 1918, Bell married Margaret Mary Settle; they had three children together, with a son dying as an infant. He died on May 20, 1947, aged 49, in Jefferson City, from renal cell carcinoma. Following his death, he was commemorated by the Missouri General Assembly. He is buried in Potosi.

Party political offices
Preceded by Robert W. Winn	Democratic nominee for State Treasurer of Missouri; 1940	Succeeded by Robert W. Winn
Preceded by Dwight H. Brown	Democratic nominee for Secretary of State of Missouri; 1944	Succeeded by Walter H. Toberman
Political offices
Preceded by Robert W. Winn	State Treasurer of Missouri; 1941–1945	Succeeded by Robert W. Winn
Preceded by Gregory C. Stockard	Secretary of State of Missouri; 1945–1947	Succeeded by Edgar C. Nelson
