= Jim Spainhower =

American politician (1928–2018)

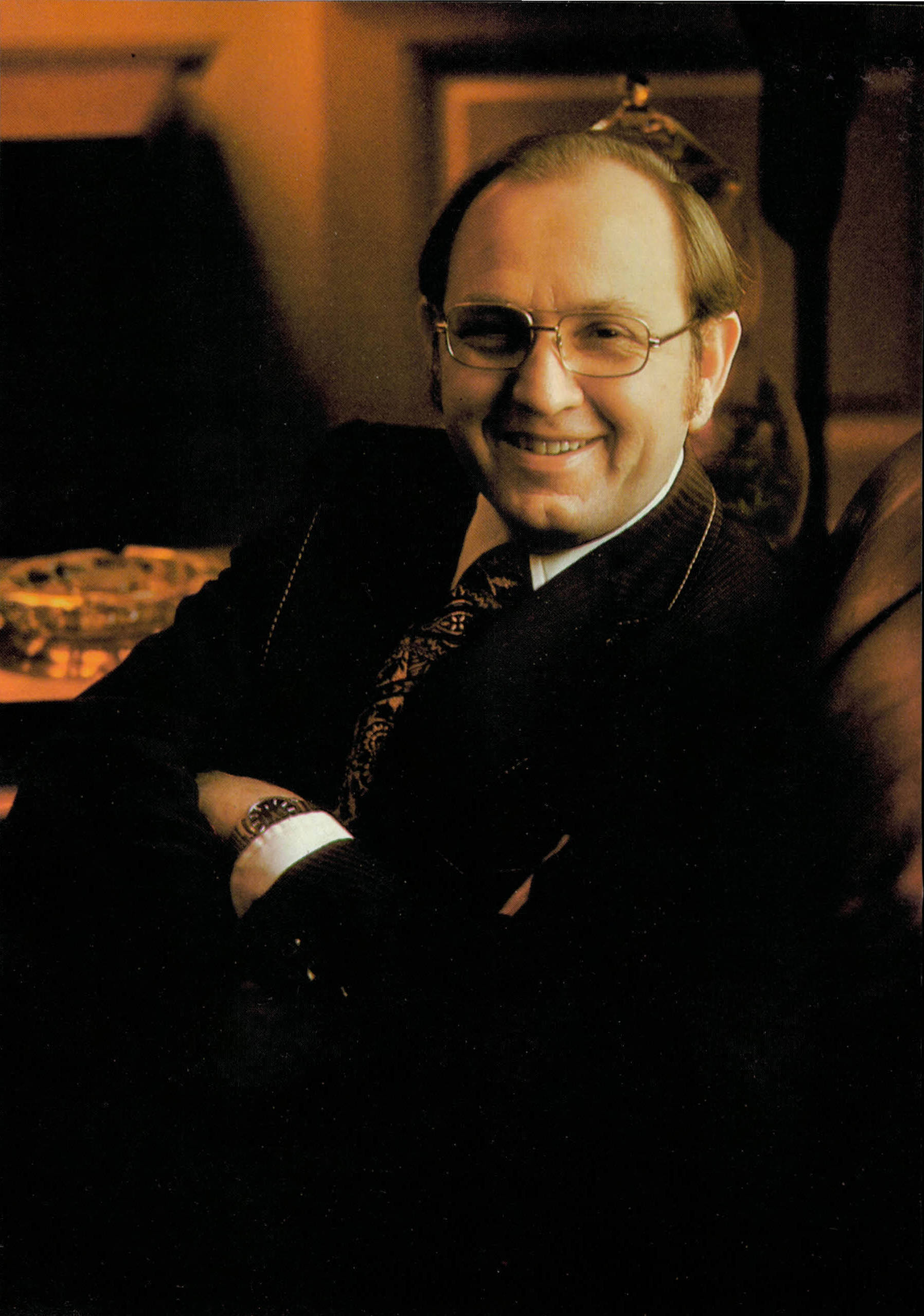

39th State Treasurer of Missouri
- In office January 8, 1973 – January 12, 1981
- Governor: Kit Bond (1973-1977); Joseph P. Teasdale (1977-1981)
- Preceded by: William E. Robinson
- Succeeded by: Mel Carnahan

Member of the Missouri House of Representatives
- In office 1963–1970

Personal details
- Born: August 3, 1928 Stanberry, Missouri, United States
- Died: December 12, 2018 (aged 90) Raymore, Missouri
- Spouse: Joanne (Steanson) Spainhower
- Children: 2
- Education: Phillips University; Lexington Theological Seminary; University of Missouri
- Profession: Politician; Minister

James Spainhower (August 3, 1928 – December 12, 2018) was an American Democratic politician from Missouri. He served four terms in the Missouri House of Representatives from 1963 to 1970 and two terms as the State Treasurer of Missouri from 1973 to 1981.

== Early life ==
Jim Spainhower was born in Stanberry, Missouri, the youngest of fourteen children. He attended an elementary school in Stanberry, and attended Maryville High School in Maryville, Missouri, graduating in 1946. Following graduation from high school, he attended Phillips University in Enid, Oklahoma, earning a bachelor's degree in history in 1950. Three years later, in 1953, he earned a bachelor's degree in divinity from Lexington Theological Seminary. On June 10, 1950, he married the former Joanne Steanson of Ponca City, Oklahoma. The couple has two children. Prior to entering politics, he served as an ordained Disciples of Christ minister, serving pastorates in Fayetteville, Arkansas, Marshall, Missouri, Bosworth, Missouri, Mendon, Missouri, Grand Pass, Missouri and Oakland, Missouri. He received both his master's degree and Ph.D in Political Science from the University of Missouri, as well as numerous honorary doctorates from colleges and universities throughout the country. Jim's brother, John Spainhower, a long-time coach and athletic director at Kirksville High School is a member of the Missouri Football Coaches Association Hall of Fame.

== Political career ==
From 1963 to 1970, Spainhower served in the Missouri House of Representatives, where he was a member of the House Appropriations Committee and Chairman of the House Education Committee. During his tenure in the state legislature, he also earned master's and doctoral degrees in political science from the University of Missouri. In 1972, he was elected as State Treasurer of Missouri, and served in that post from 1973 to 1981. Unable to seek a third term as State Treasurer in 1980, he was an unsuccessful candidate for Governor of Missouri, losing the Democratic Party nomination to incumbent Joseph P. Teasdale.

Spainhower threw his hat into the ring for the 1976 United States Senate election in Missouri after the initial Democratic nominee Jerry Litton was killed while flying to the victory party. On August 21, the Democratic state committee selected Warren E. Hearnes as the replacement nominee over Spainhower by a 38 to 22 vote. Hearnes lost the general election to John Danforth who garnered 56.9% of the vote.

== Later career ==
Following his tenure as State Treasurer, Spainhower held the posts of President of the College of the Ozarks in Point Lookout, Missouri, President of Lindenwood University in St. Charles, Missouri and President of the Division of Higher Education for the Disciples of Christ denomination. He and his wife subsequently moved to Rogers, Arkansas, where he served as an interim pastor at several churches in Bella Vista, Arkansas, Harrison, Arkansas and Bentonville, Arkansas. He and his wife lived in Raymore, Missouri until the time of his death.

Party political offices
Preceded by William Edmond Robinson	Democratic nominee for State Treasurer of Missouri; 1972, 1976	Succeeded by Mel Carnahan
Political offices
Preceded by William E. Robinson	State Treasurer of Missouri; 1973–1981	Succeeded by Mel Carnahan
