= Robert W. Winn =

American politician (1895–1948)

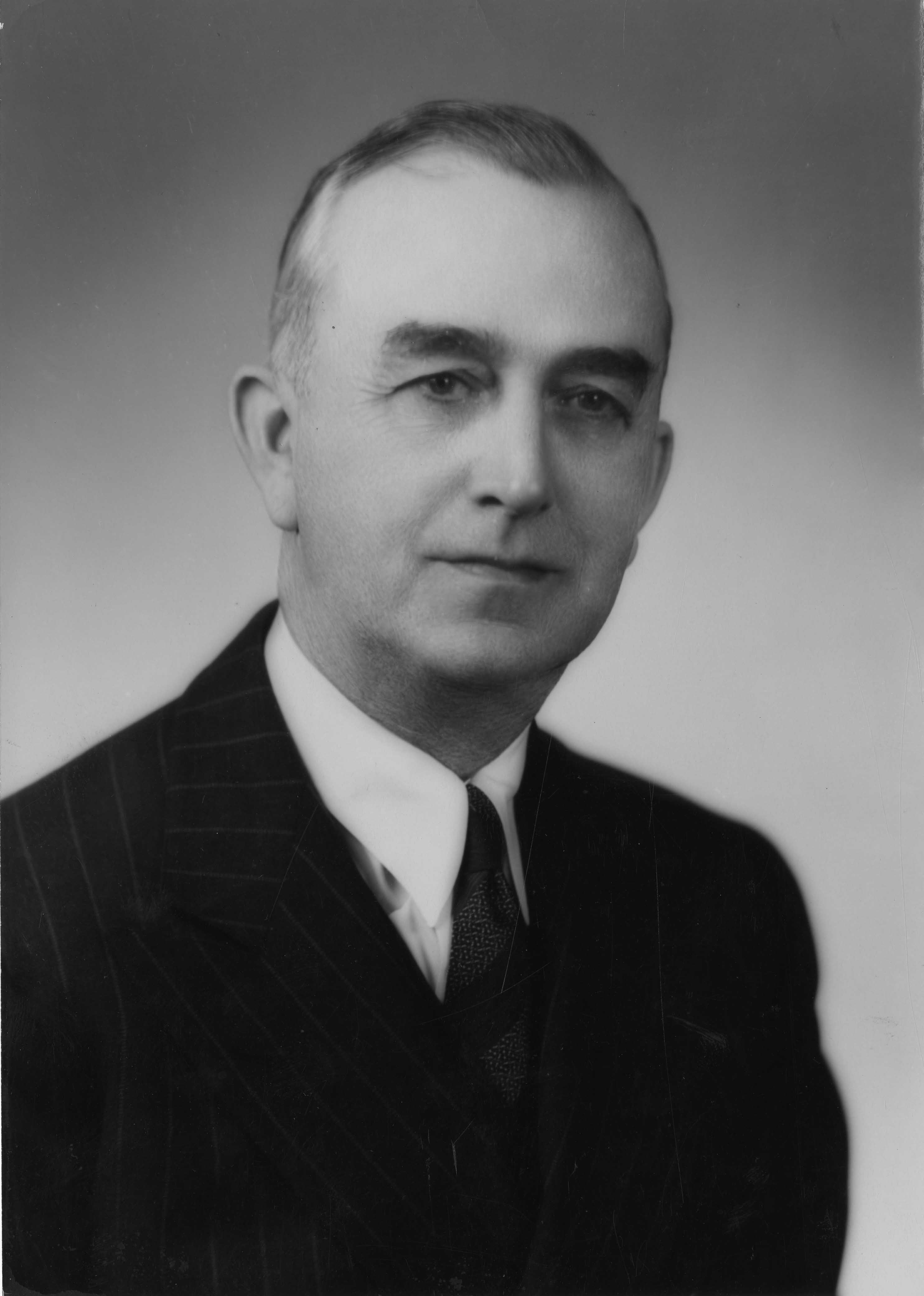
- Winn, c. 1941

State Treasurer of Missouri
- In office January 1937 – 1941
- Preceded by: Richard R. Nacy
- Succeeded by: Wilson Bell
- In office January 1945 – August 13, 1948
- Preceded by: Wilson Bell
- Succeeded by: Richard R. Nacy

Personal details
- Born: Robert William Winn; June 9, 1895 New London, Missouri, US
- Died: August 13, 1948 (aged 53) St. Charles, Missouri, US
- Party: Democratic

Robert William Winn (June 9, 1895 – August 13, 1948) was an American politician. He served as State Treasurer of Missouri from 1937 to 1941, and from 1945 to 1948.

== Biography ==
Winn was born on June 9, 1895, in New London, Missouri. Until 1930, he operated a candy store.

A Democrat, Winn was elected clerk of Ralls County in 1930, serving as such until being elected State Treasurer of Missouri in November 1936. He served as Treasurer between January 1937 and 1941, and earned $3,000 annually. During his tenure, the Treasury received the responsibilities of the Missouri State Social Security Commission. From 1941 to January 1945, he was commissioner of the Permanent Seat of Government, after which he served his second, nonconsecutive tenure, between January 1945 and his death. For his second tenure, he earned $7,500 annually. Ten days prior to his death, he won the Democratic primary for Missouri Secretary of State. He could sing, which he did during his political campaigns. Also for campaigns, he used the slogan "Win With Winn" and appealed to working people.

On December 7, 1921, Winn married Victoria Silver; they had one daughter together. He died in office on August 13, 1948, aged 53. He had been hospitalized the day prior, due to coronary thrombosis, dying in St. Luke's Hospital, in St. Charles. His funeral was held in Jefferson City, and he is buried in New London. After his death, Richard R. Nacy was appointed by Governor Phil M. Donnelly to filled his unexpired term, himself also serving a consesucutive term.

Party political offices
Preceded by Richard R. Nacy	Democratic nominee for State Treasurer of Missouri; 1936	Succeeded by Wilson Bell
Preceded by Wilson Bell	Democratic nominee for State Treasurer of Missouri; 1944	Succeeded by Mount Etna Morris
Political offices
Preceded by Richard R. Nacy	State Treasurer of Missouri; 1937–1941	Succeeded by Wilson Bell
Preceded by Wilson Bell	State Treasurer of Missouri; 1945–1948	Succeeded by Richard R. Nacy
