= Richard R. Nacy =

Missouri politician (1895–1961)

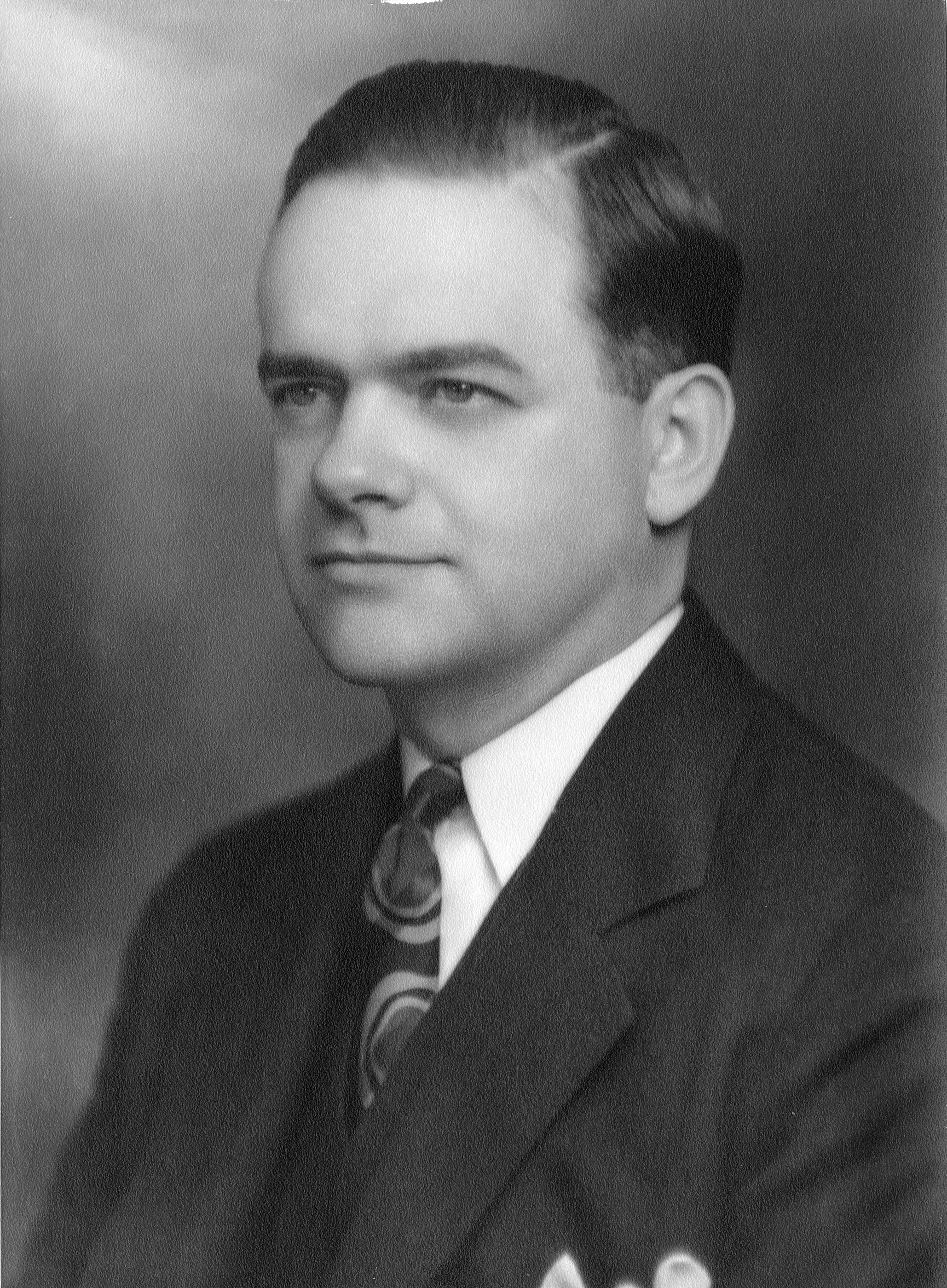
- Nacy, c. 1938

State Treasurer of Missouri
- In office 1933–1937
- Preceded by: Larry Brunk
- Succeeded by: Robert W. Winn
- In office August 18, 1948 – 1949
- Preceded by: Robert W. Winn
- Succeeded by: Mount Etna Morris

Personal details
- Born: Richard Robert Nacy; November 7, 1895 Jefferson City, Missouri, US
- Died: January 10, 1961 (aged 65) Jefferson City, Missouri, US
- Party: Democratic

Richard Robert Nacy Sr. (November 7, 1895 – January 10, 1961) was an American politician. He served as State Treasurer of Missouri from 1933 to 1937, and from 1948 to 1949.

== Biography ==
Nacy was born on November 7, 1895, in Jefferson City, Missouri, to shoemaker Peter Nacy and Honora Collins Nacy. During World War I, he enlisted to the 356th Regiment of the American Expeditionary Forces on September 21, 1917. He achieved the rank of captain of the United States Army Reserve. He left the military on March 26, 1919.

A Democrat, Nacy was elected Jefferson City's clerk in June 1919, then clerk of Cole County courts, beginning in January 1923 and being last elected in 1930. He served as State Treasurer of Missouri from 1933 to 1937, as which he earned an annual $3,000. He served during the Great Depression, though the state obtained no debt during his tenure. He nonconsecutively served from August 18, 1848 to 1949, after he was appointed by Governor Phil M. Donnelly to fill the unexpired term of Robert W. Winn. He earned $7,500 per year during his term tenure. During the presidency of Harry S. Truman, he served as vice chairman of the Democratic National Committee. He was credited, among others, for bringing Missouri to support John F. Kennedy. He was invited to his inauguration, though died before attending.

Nacy was named vice president of the Central Missouri Trust Company on January 6, 1937, and he remained with the company until the start of his second tenure. He returned to the company in January 1949, serving as its president from November 17, 1955, until his death. He was also president of the Reserve Officers Association of the State of Missouri.

Nacy was Catholic. In 1920, he married Anna Dorsey; they had three children together. He died on January 10, 1961, aged 65, in Jefferson City, from a myocardial infarction. The Missouri General Assembly paid tribute to him. He is buried in Resurrection Cemetery, in Jefferson City.

Party political offices
Preceded by John H. Stone	Democratic nominee for State Treasurer of Missouri; 1928, 1932	Succeeded by Robert W. Winn
Political offices
Preceded by Larry Brunk	State Treasurer of Missouri; 1933–1937	Succeeded by Robert W. Winn
Preceded by Robert W. Winn	State Treasurer of Missouri; 1948–1949	Succeeded by Mount Etna Morris
