= Mount Etna Morris =

American politician (1900–1988)

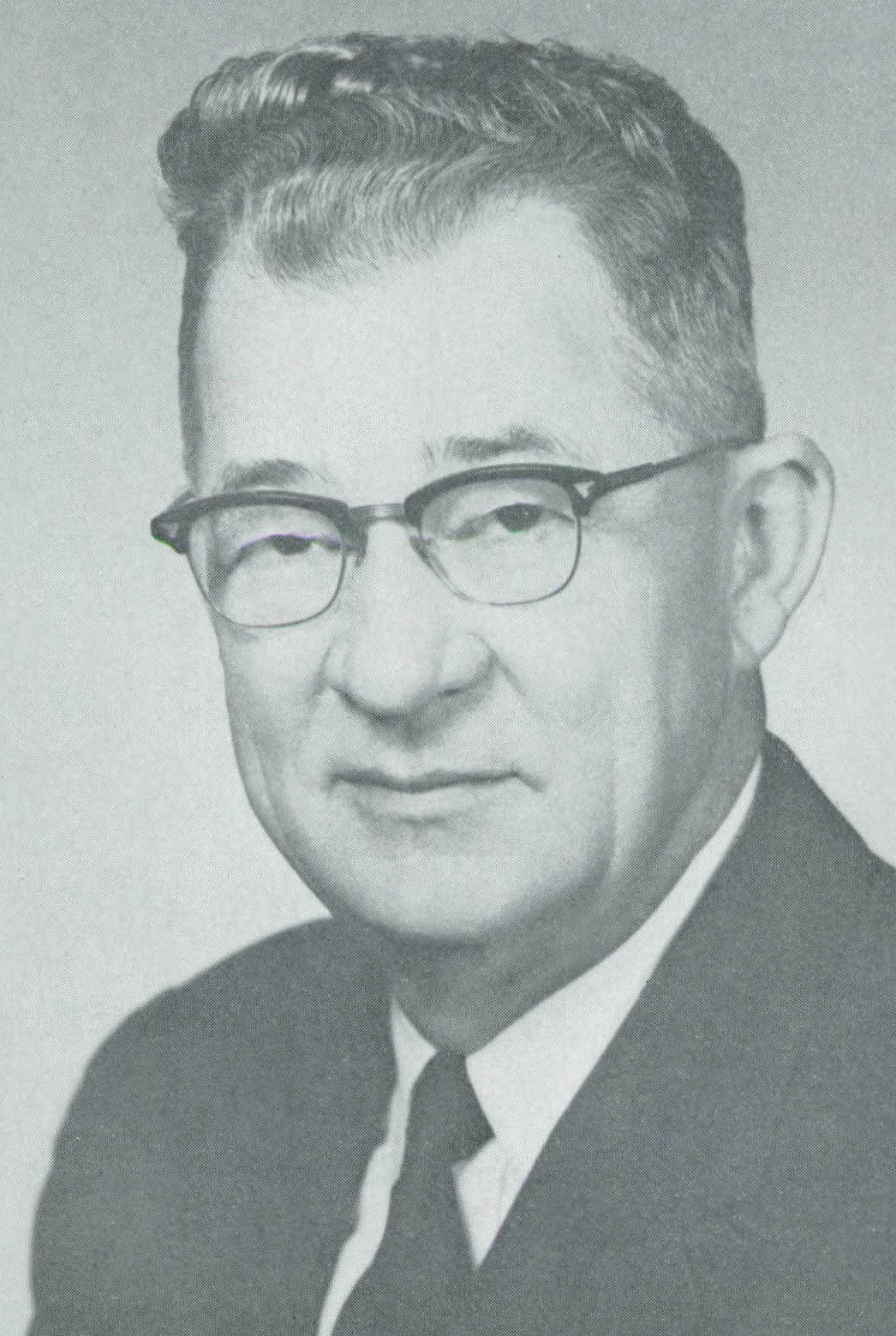

33rd, 35th & 37th State Treasurer of Missouri
- In office January 1965 – January 1969
- Governor: Warren E. Hearnes
- Preceded by: Milton Carpenter
- Succeeded by: William Edmond Robinson
- In office January 1957 – January 1961
- Governor: James T. Blair Jr.
- Preceded by: George Hubert Bates
- Succeeded by: Milton Carpenter
- In office January 1949 – January 1953
- Governor: Forrest Smith
- Preceded by: Richard R. Nacy
- Succeeded by: George Hubert Bates

Member of the Missouri House of Representatives
- In office 1932–1936

Personal details
- Born: September 1, 1900 Dadeville, Missouri, United States
- Died: July 8, 1988 (aged 87)
- Party: Democratic
- Spouse(s): Helen Adamson Morris; Margery Lott Adamson Morrison
- Children: Four (two with first wife, two step-children)
- Education: Southwest Missouri State College; University of Missouri
- Profession: Banking; Politics

Mount Etna Morris (September 1, 1900 – July 8, 1988) was an American politician from Missouri. A Democrat, he served three non-consecutive terms as State Treasurer of Missouri as well as two non-consecutive terms as Director of the Missouri Department of Revenue and two terms in the Missouri House of Representatives.

== Early life and education ==
Morris was born September 1, 1900, in Dadeville, Missouri, to hardware merchant Albert G. Morris and his wife. He had two siblings; a brother A. George Morris, an official with the Missouri Department of Conservation, and a sister Lucille Morris Upton, an author and newspaper reporter. Following graduation from Walnut Grove High School, Morris served in the military during World War I. After his military service, Morris attended Southwest Missouri State College in Springfield and later the University of Missouri. On December 24, 1922, he married the former Helen Adamson of Everton, Missouri, and had two children. In April, 1967, he married Margery Lott Adamson, the widow of one of his first wife's relatives.

== Business and politics ==
In 1928, Morris founded and managed the People's Bank in Miller, Missouri. From 1932 to 1936, he served two terms in the Missouri House of Representatives. Following his service in the state legislature, he was CEO of the Trenton National Bank from 1936 to 1945. He re-joined state government in 1945, serving for a year as commissioner of the state Division of Finance, before becoming the first director of the newly created Missouri Department of Revenue in the Cabinet of Governor Phil M. Donnelly in July, 1946, serving until his election as state treasurer. From 1949 to 1953, he served as State Treasurer of Missouri. He served again as director of the state Department of Revenue from 1953 to 1956, during Phil Donnelly's second term as governor, before resigning in order to seek a second term as state treasurer, which he served from 1957 to 1961. He was subsequently reelected to a third term as state treasurer, serving from 1965 to 1969.

Party political offices
Preceded by Robert W. Winn	Democratic nominee for State Treasurer of Missouri; 1948	Succeeded by George Hubert Bates
Preceded by George Hubert Bates	Democratic nominee for State Treasurer of Missouri; 1956	Succeeded by Milton Carpenter
Preceded by Milton Carpenter	Democratic nominee for State Treasurer of Missouri; 1964	Succeeded by William Edmond Robinson
Political offices
Preceded by Richard R. Nacy	State Treasurer of Missouri; 1949–1953	Succeeded by George Hubert Bates
Preceded by George Hubert Bates	State Treasurer of Missouri; 1957–1961	Succeeded by Milton Carpenter
Preceded by Milton Carpenter	State Treasurer of Missouri; 1965–1969	Succeeded by William Edmond Robinson
