= 1904 Missouri State Treasurer election =

- November 8, 1904
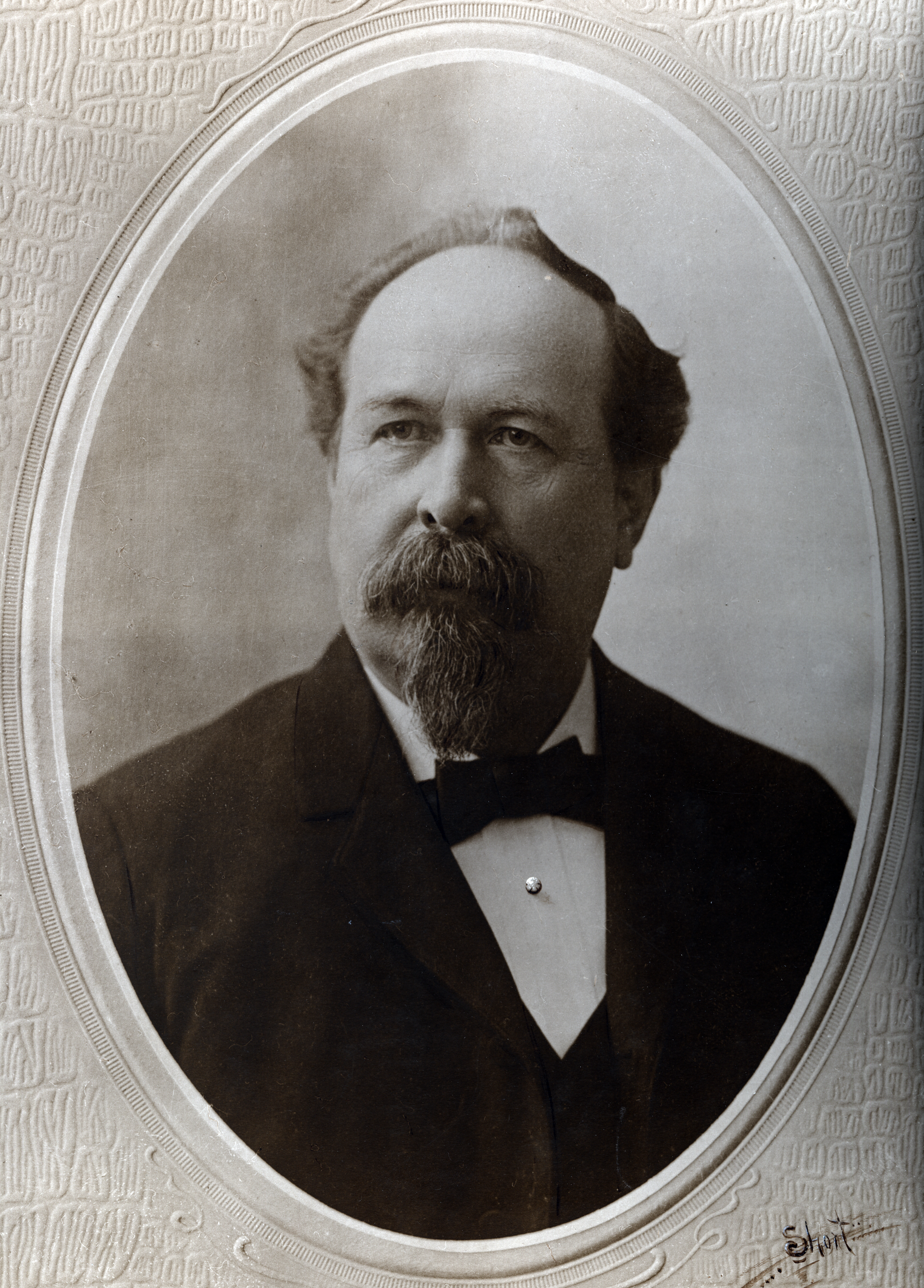

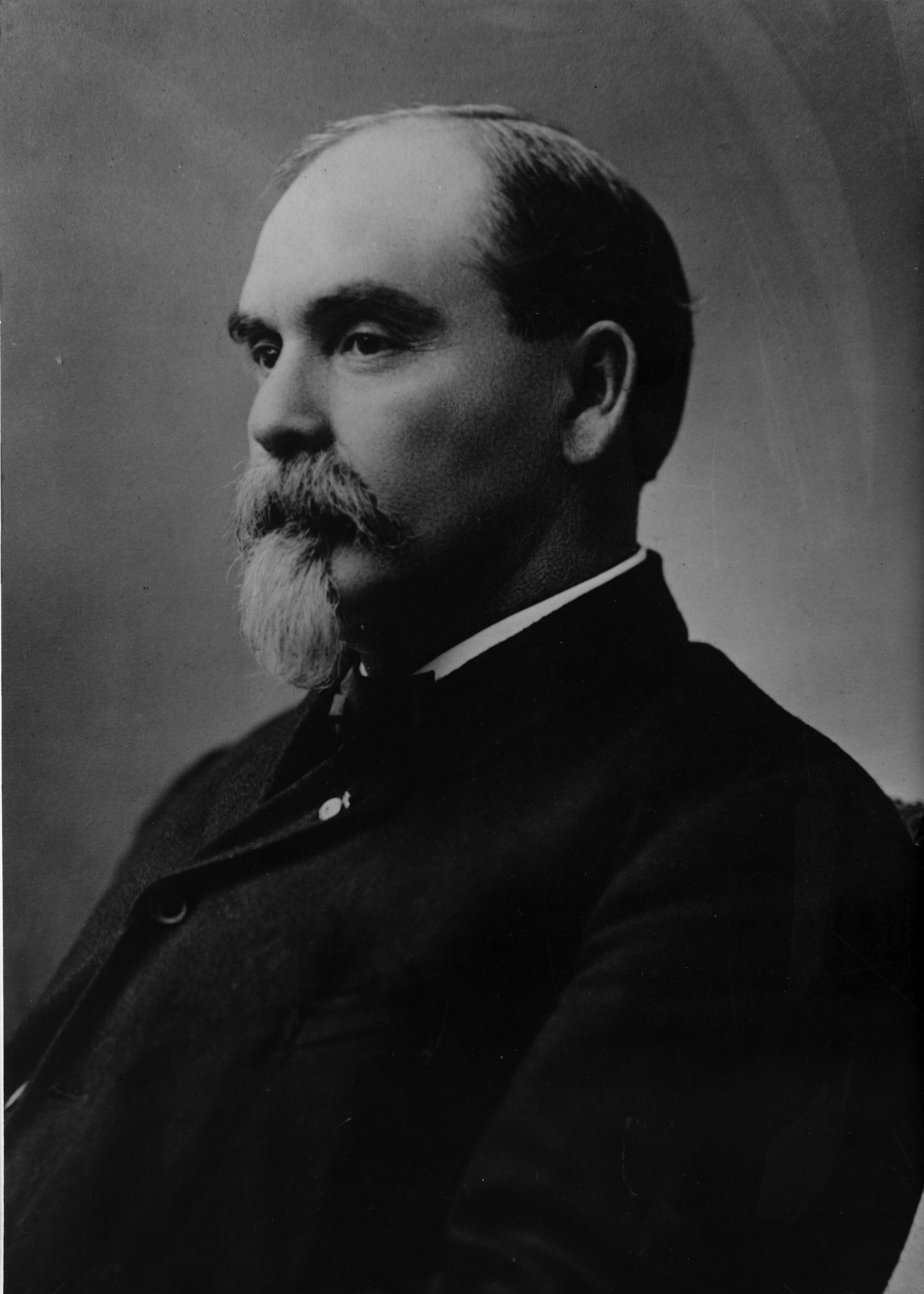
Nominee	Jacob F. Gmelich	James Cowgill
Party	Republican	Democratic
Popular vote	316,730	303,477
Percentage	49.13%	47.08%
State Treasurer before election
Robert P. Williams
Democratic
Elected State Treasurer
Jacob F. Gmelich
Republican

The 1904 Missouri State Treasurer election was held on November 8, 1904, in order to elect the state treasurer of Missouri. Republican nominee Jacob F. Gmelich defeated Democratic nominee James Cowgill, Socialist nominee Charles A. Richardson, Prohibition nominee Daniel L. Sims, People's nominee James M. Burrus and Socialist Labor nominee Otto Schwitzgebel.

== General election ==
On election day, November 8, 1904, Republican nominee Jacob F. Gmelich won the election by a margin of 13,253 votes against his foremost opponent Democratic nominee James Cowgill, thereby gaining Republican control over the office of state treasurer. Gmelich was sworn in as the 21st state treasurer of Missouri on January 9, 1905.

=== Results ===
Missouri State Treasurer election, 1904
Party	Candidate	Votes	%
Republican	Jacob F. Gmelich	316,730	49.13
Democratic	James Cowgill	303,477	47.08
Socialist	Charles A. Richardson	12,477	1.94
Prohibition	Daniel L. Sims	6,792	1.05
Populist	James M. Burrus	3,639	0.56
Socialist Labor	Otto Schwitzgebel	1,549	0.24
Total votes		644,664	100.00
Republican gain from Democratic			

== See also ==
- 1904 Missouri gubernatorial election
