= 1916 Missouri State Treasurer election =

- November 7, 1916
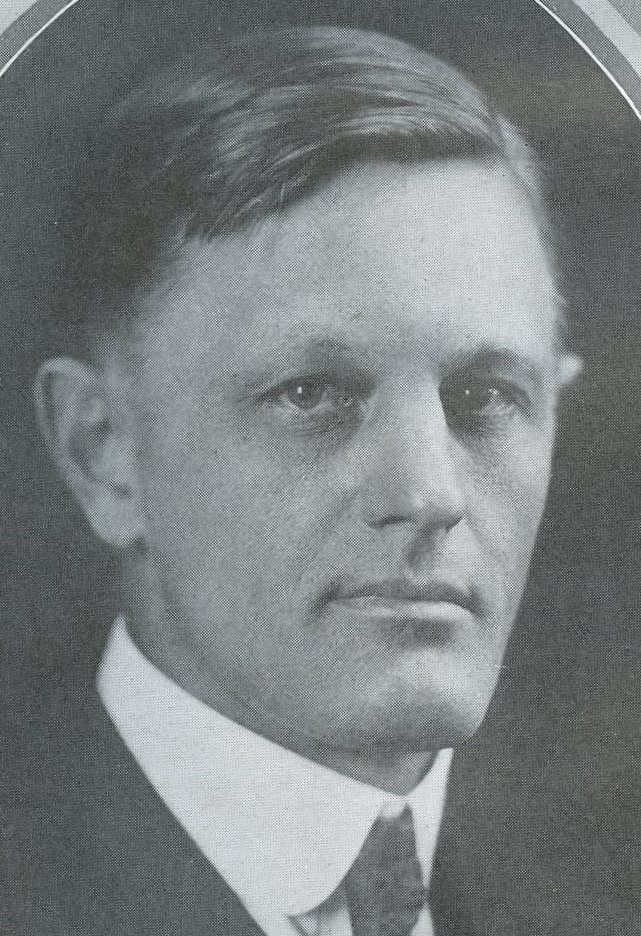

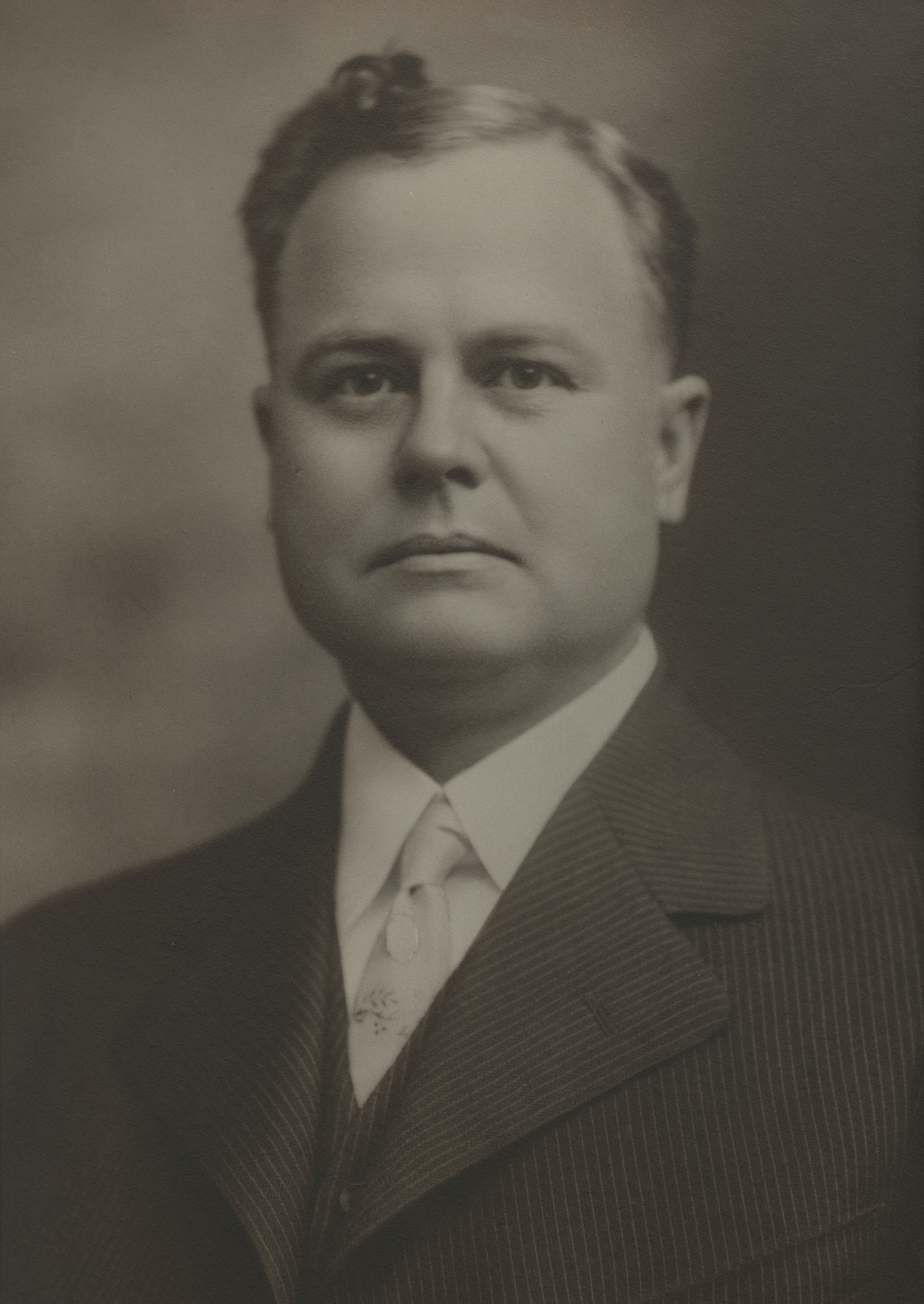
Nominee	George H. Middelkamp	Lorenzo Dow Thompson
Party	Democratic	Republican
Popular vote	395,391	372,609
Percentage	50.27%	47.37%
State Treasurer before election
Edwin P. Deal
Democratic
Elected State Treasurer
George H. Middelkamp
Democratic

The 1916 Missouri State Treasurer election was held on November 7, 1916, in order to elect the state treasurer of Missouri. Democratic nominee George H. Middelkamp defeated Republican nominee Lorenzo Dow Thompson, Socialist nominee J. F. Harlow and Prohibition nominee Ed Brandt.

== General election ==
On election day, November 7, 1916, Democratic nominee George H. Middelkamp won the election by a margin of 22,782 votes against his foremost opponent Republican nominee Lorenzo Dow Thompson, thereby retaining Democratic control over the office of state treasurer. Middelkamp was sworn in as the 24th state treasurer of Missouri on January 8, 1917.

=== Results ===
Missouri State Treasurer election, 1916
Party	Candidate	Votes	%
Democratic	George H. Middelkamp	395,391	50.27
Republican	Lorenzo Dow Thompson	372,609	47.37
Socialist	J. F. Harlow	14,678	1.87
Prohibition	Ed Brandt	3,856	0.49
Total votes		786,534	100.00
Democratic hold			

== See also ==
- 1916 Missouri gubernatorial election
