= 1912 Missouri State Treasurer election =

- November 5, 1912
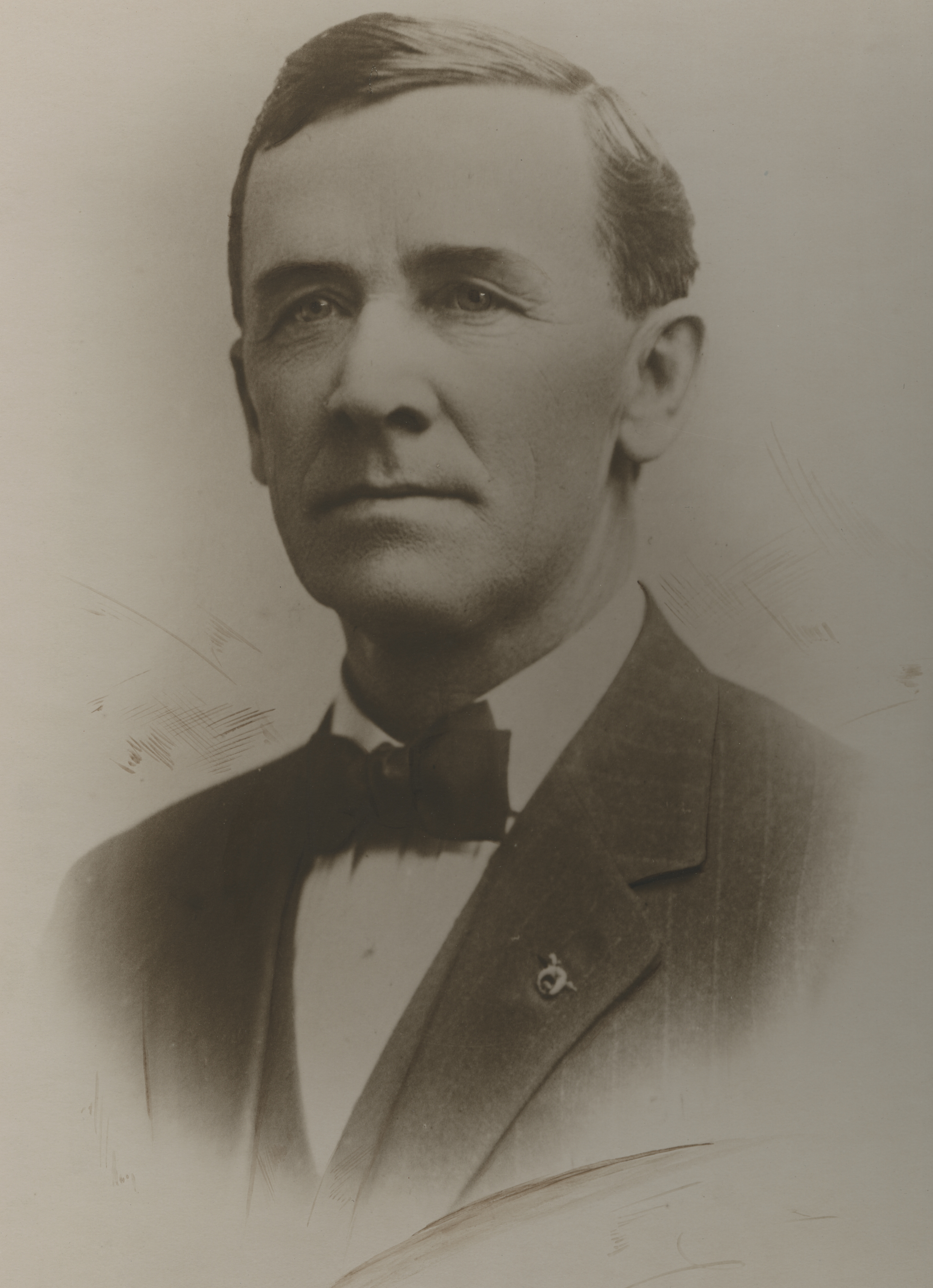

Nominee	Edwin P. Deal	Daniel H. Hoefer	John Ball
Party	Democratic	Republican	Progressive
Popular vote	332,485	215,532	115,494
Percentage	47.57%	30.84%	16.53%
State Treasurer before election
James Cowgill
Democratic
Elected State Treasurer
Edwin P. Deal
Democratic

The 1912 Missouri State Treasurer election was held on November 5, 1912, in order to elect the state treasurer of Missouri. Democratic nominee and incumbent member of the Missouri House of Representatives Edwin P. Deal defeated Republican nominee Daniel H. Hoefer, Progressive nominee John Ball, Socialist nominee W. W. McAllister, Prohibition nominee Leonard R. Woods and Socialist Labor nominee Otto Schwitzgebel.

== General election ==
On election day, November 5, 1912, Democratic nominee Edwin P. Deal won the election by a margin of 116,953 votes against his foremost opponent Republican nominee Daniel H. Hoefer, thereby retaining Democratic control over the office of state treasurer. Deal was sworn in as the 23rd state treasurer of Missouri on January 13, 1913.

=== Results ===
Missouri State Treasurer election, 1912
Party	Candidate	Votes	%
Democratic	Edwin P. Deal	332,485	47.57
Republican	Daniel H. Hoefer	215,532	30.84
Progressive	John Ball	115,494	16.53
Socialist	W. W. McAllister	28,286	4.05
Prohibition	Leonard R. Woods	5,265	0.75
Socialist Labor	Otto Schwitzgebel	1,861	0.26
Total votes		698,923	100.00
Democratic hold			

== See also ==
- 1912 Missouri gubernatorial election
