= 1896 Missouri State Treasurer election =

- November 3, 1896
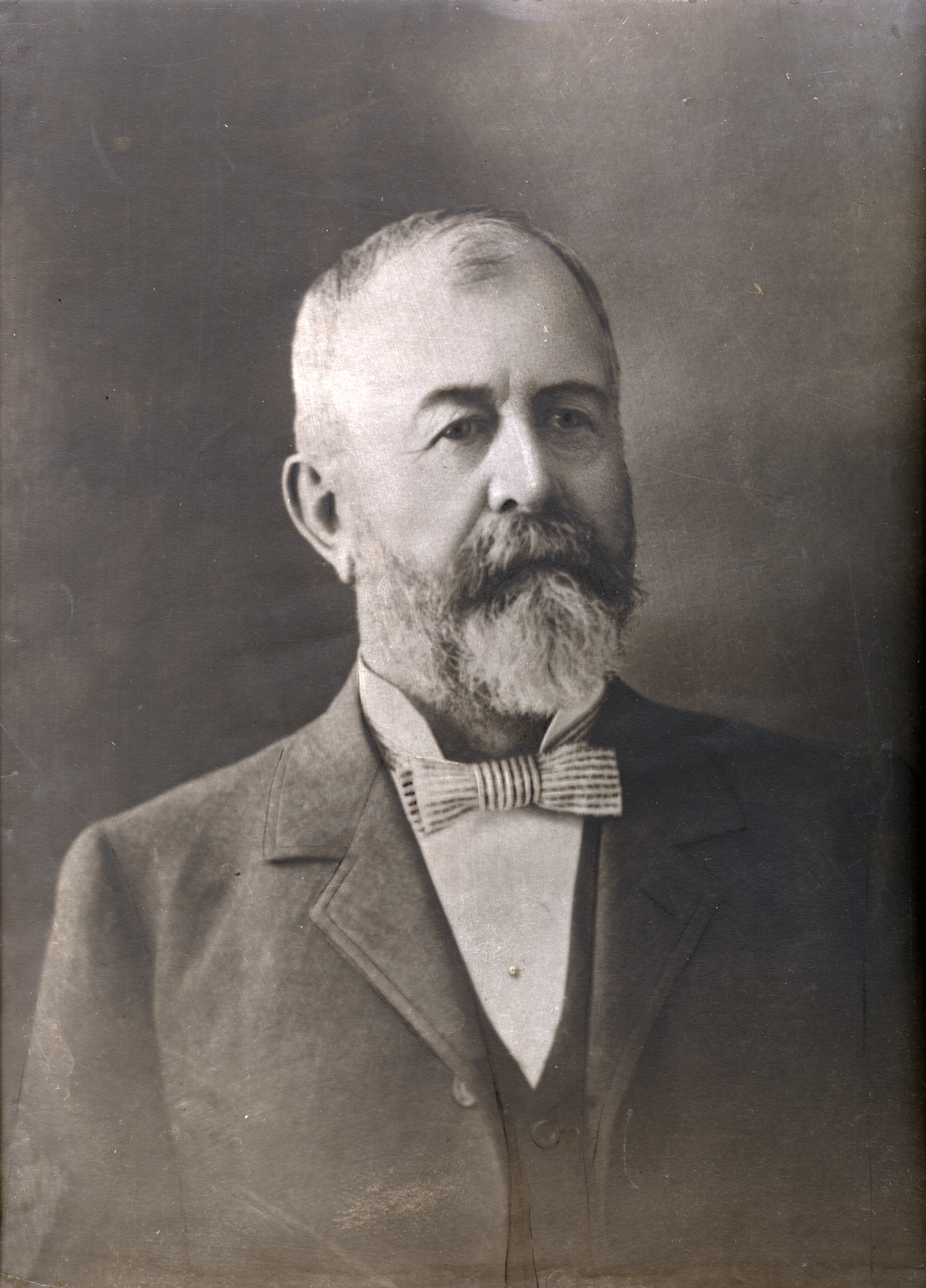

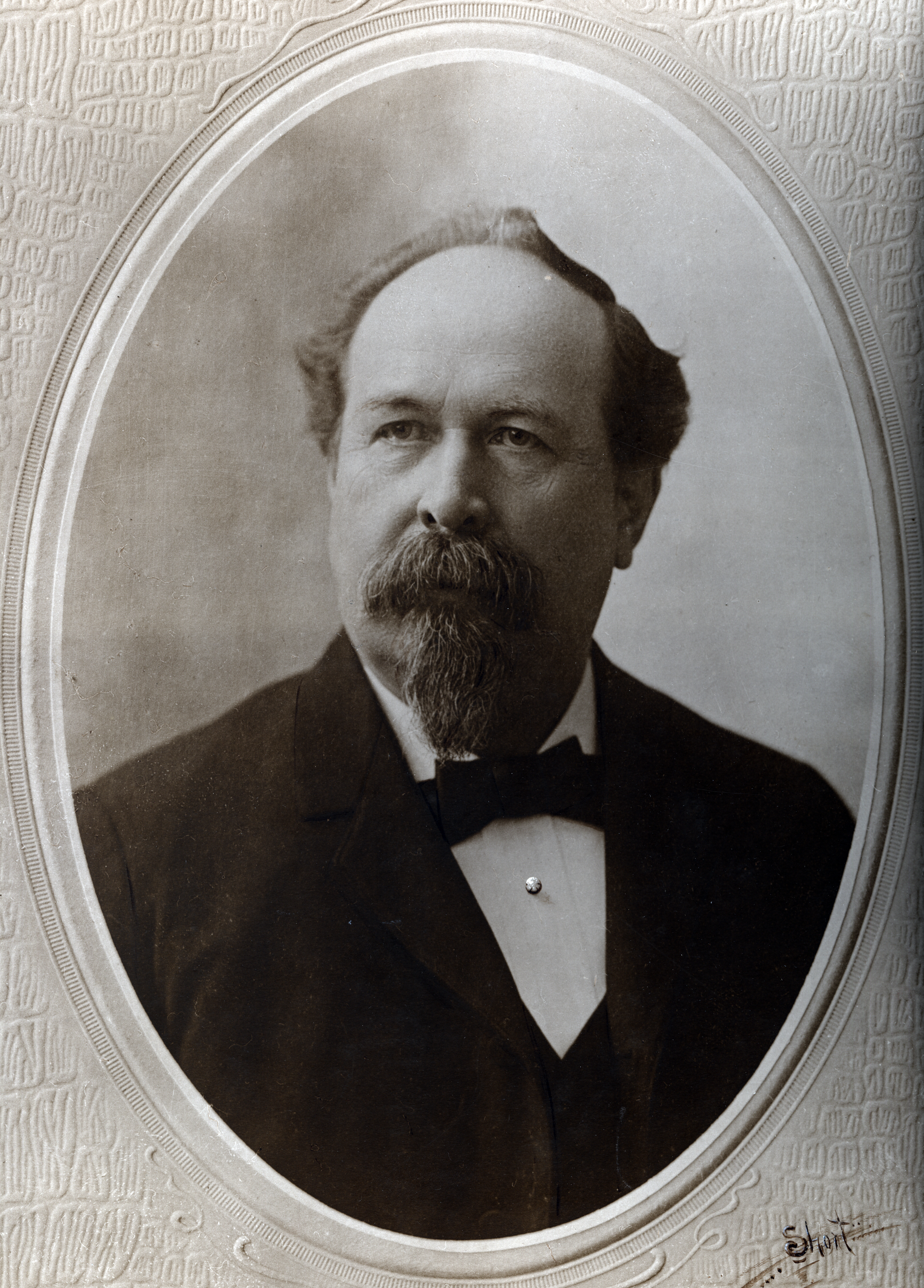
Nominee	Frank L. Pitts	Jacob F. Gmelich
Party	Democratic	Republican
Popular vote	341,003	304,343
Percentage	50.58%	45.14%
State Treasurer before election
Lawrence Vest Stephens
Democratic
Elected State Treasurer
Frank L. Pitts
Democratic

The 1896 Missouri State Treasurer election was held on November 3, 1896, in order to elect the state treasurer of Missouri. Democratic nominee Frank L. Pitts defeated Republican nominee Jacob F. Gmelich, People's nominee Oscar Wood, Prohibition nominee Irving T. Hull, National Democratic nominee William McIlwrath and Socialist Labor nominee Henry J. Poelling.

== General election ==
On election day, November 3, 1896, Democratic nominee Frank L. Pitts won the election by a margin of 36,660 votes against his foremost opponent Republican nominee Jacob F. Gmelich, thereby retaining Democratic control over the office of state treasurer. Pitts was sworn in as the 19th state treasurer of Missouri on January 11, 1897.

=== Results ===
Missouri State Treasurer election, 1896
Party	Candidate	Votes	%
Democratic	Frank L. Pitts	341,003	50.58
Republican	Jacob F. Gmelich	304,343	45.14
Populist	Oscar Wood	23,941	3.55
Prohibition	Irving T. Hull	2,267	0.34
National Democratic	William McIlwrath	2,014	0.30
Socialist Labor	Henry J. Poelling	634	0.09
Total votes		674,202	100.00
Democratic hold			

== See also ==
- 1896 Missouri gubernatorial election
