= 1924 Missouri State Auditor election =

- November 4, 1924
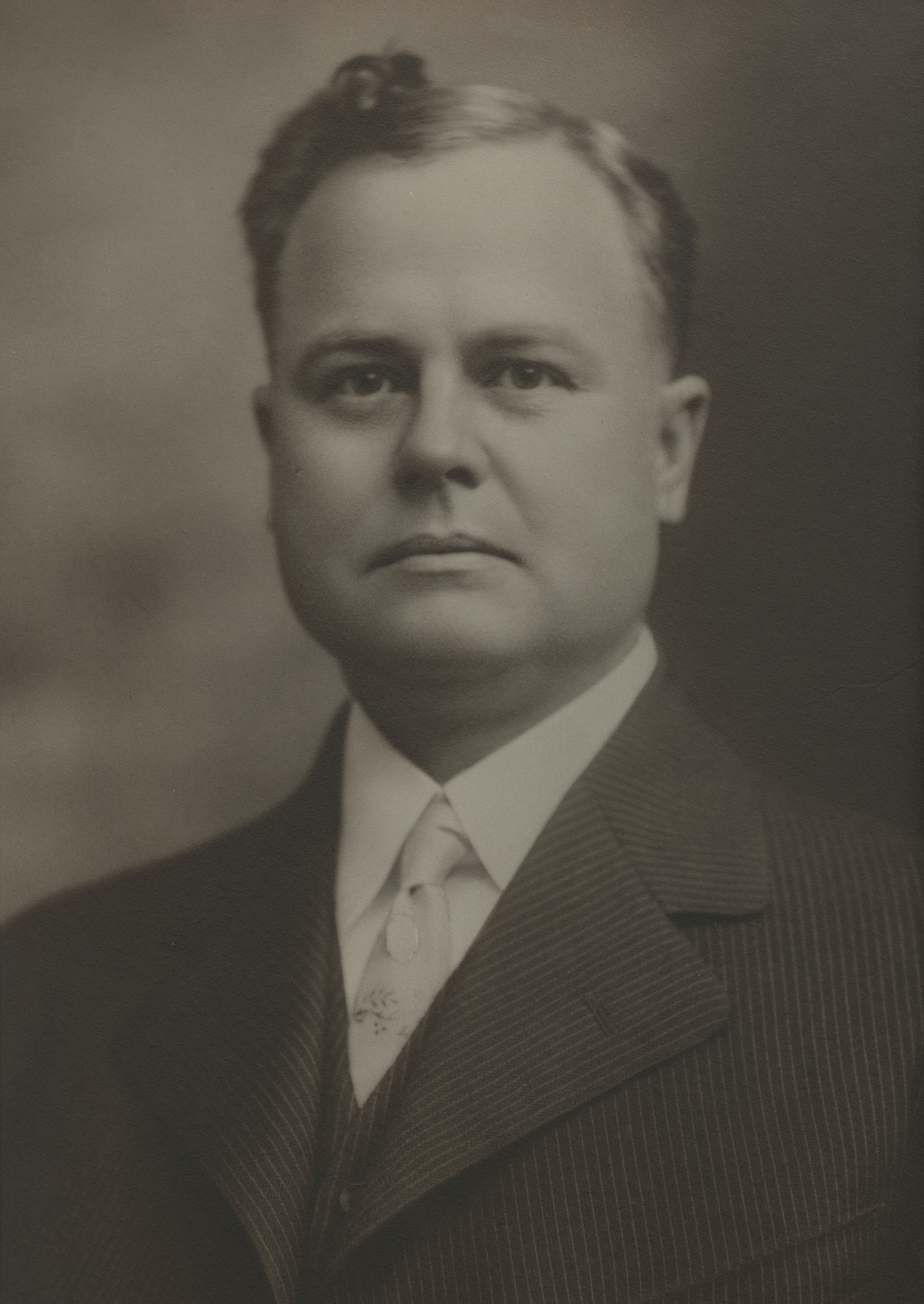

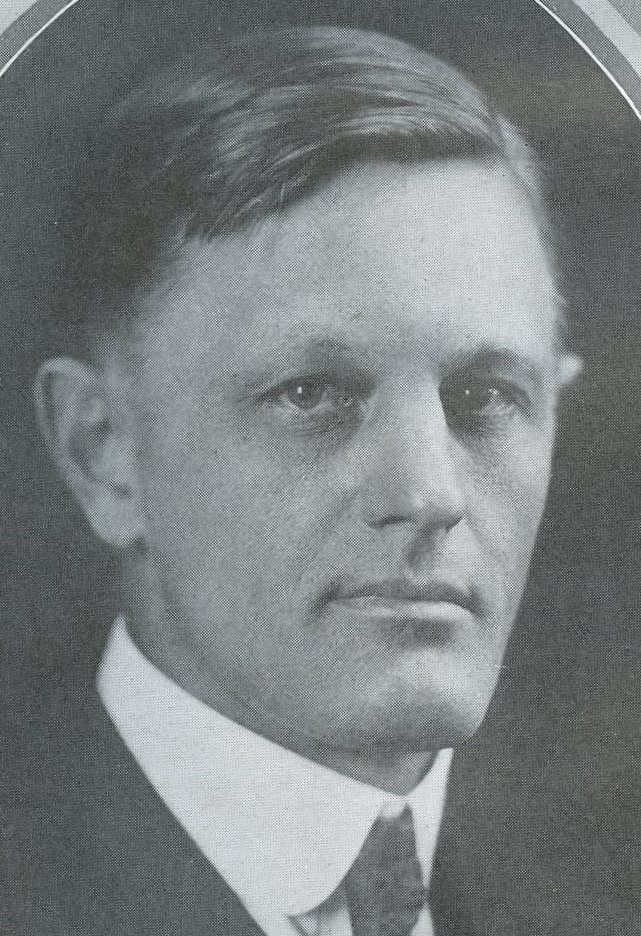
Nominee	Lorenzo Dow Thompson	George H. Middelkamp
Party	Republican	Democratic
Popular vote	648,910	613,210
Percentage	50.50%	47.73%
State Auditor before election
George Ernst Hackman
Republican
Elected State Auditor
Lorenzo Dow Thompson
Republican

The 1924 Missouri State Auditor election was held on November 4, 1924, in order to elect the state auditor of Missouri. Republican nominee and incumbent state treasurer of Missouri Lorenzo Dow Thompson defeated Democratic nominee and former state treasurer of Missouri George H. Middelkamp, Socialist nominee A. B. Griep and Socialist Labor nominee Henry Knobel.

== General election ==
On election day, November 4, 1924, Republican nominee Lorenzo Dow Thompson won the election by a margin of 35,700 votes against his foremost opponent Democratic nominee George H. Middelkamp, thereby retaining Republican control over the office of state auditor. Thompson was sworn in as the 24th state auditor of Missouri on January 12, 1925.

=== Results ===
Missouri State Auditor election, 1924
Party	Candidate	Votes	%
Republican	Lorenzo Dow Thompson	648,910	50.50
Democratic	George H. Middelkamp	613,210	47.73
Socialist	A. B. Griep	22,146	1.72
Socialist Labor	Henry Knobel	595	0.05
Total votes		1,284,861	100.00
Republican hold			

== See also ==
- 1924 Missouri gubernatorial election
