= 1920 Missouri State Treasurer election =

- November 2, 1920
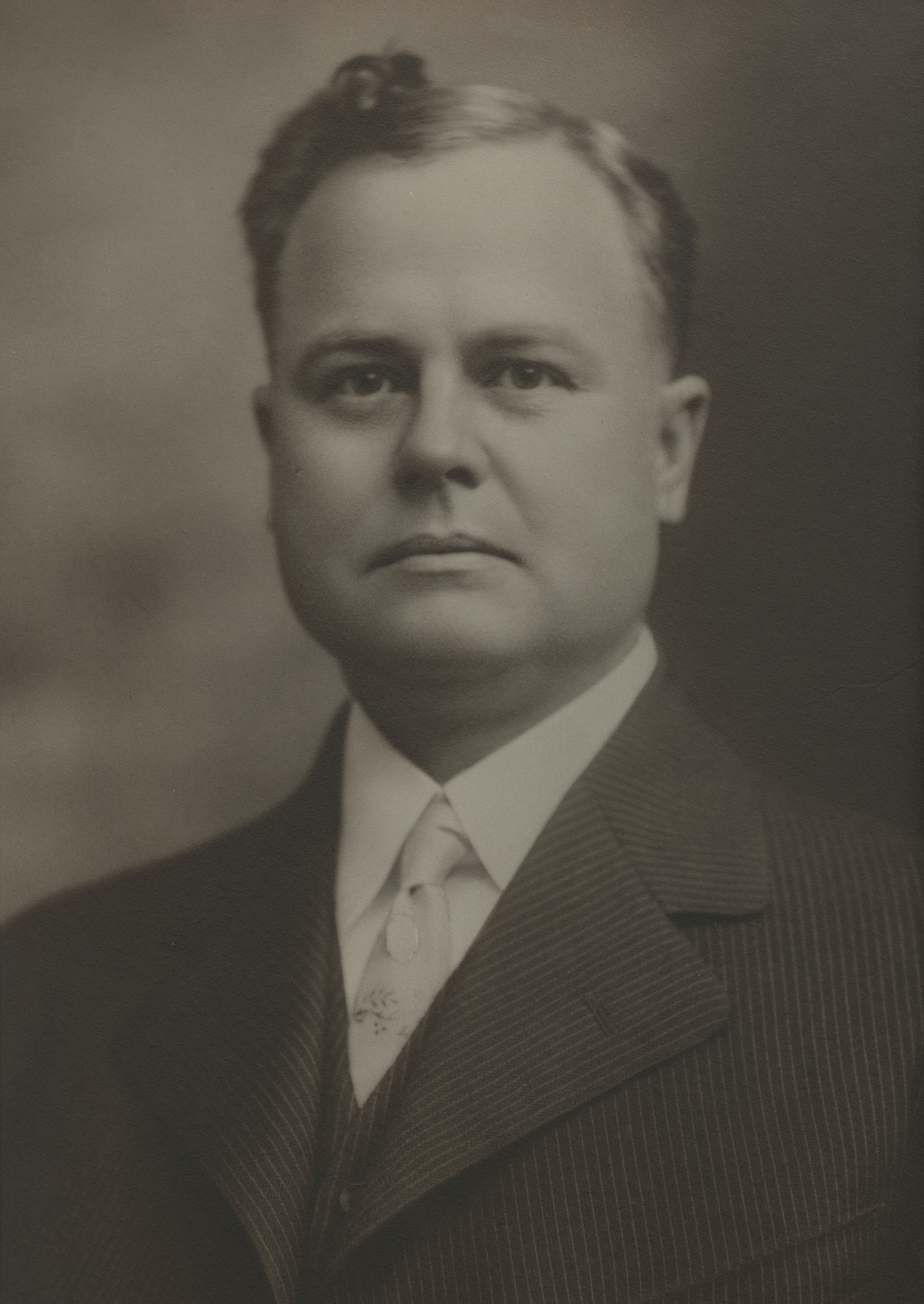

Nominee	Lorenzo Dow Thompson	John H. Stone
Party	Republican	Democratic
Popular vote	726,038	577,375
Percentage	54.69%	43.49%
State Treasurer before election
George H. Middelkamp
Democratic
Elected State Treasurer
Lorenzo Dow Thompson
Republican

The 1920 Missouri State Treasurer election was held on November 2, 1920, in order to elect the state treasurer of Missouri. Republican nominee Lorenzo Dow Thompson defeated Democratic nominee John H. Stone, Socialist nominee James R. Stewart, Farmer-Worker nominee Clayton H. Johnson and Socialist Labor nominee William Veal.

== General election ==
On election day, November 2, 1920, Republican nominee Lorenzo Dow Thompson won the election by a margin of 148,663 votes against his foremost opponent Democratic nominee John H. Stone, thereby gaining Republican control over the office of state treasurer. Thompson was sworn in as the 25th state treasurer of Missouri on January 10, 1921.

=== Results ===
Missouri State Treasurer election, 1920
Party	Candidate	Votes	%
Republican	Lorenzo Dow Thompson	726,038	54.69
Democratic	John H. Stone	577,375	43.49
Socialist	James R. Stewart	19,582	1.48
Farmer–Labor	Clayton H. Johnson	3,008	0.23
Socialist Labor	William Veal	1,582	0.11
Total votes		1,327,585	100.00
Republican gain from Democratic			

== See also ==
- 1920 Missouri gubernatorial election
