= 1908 Missouri State Treasurer election =

- November 3, 1908
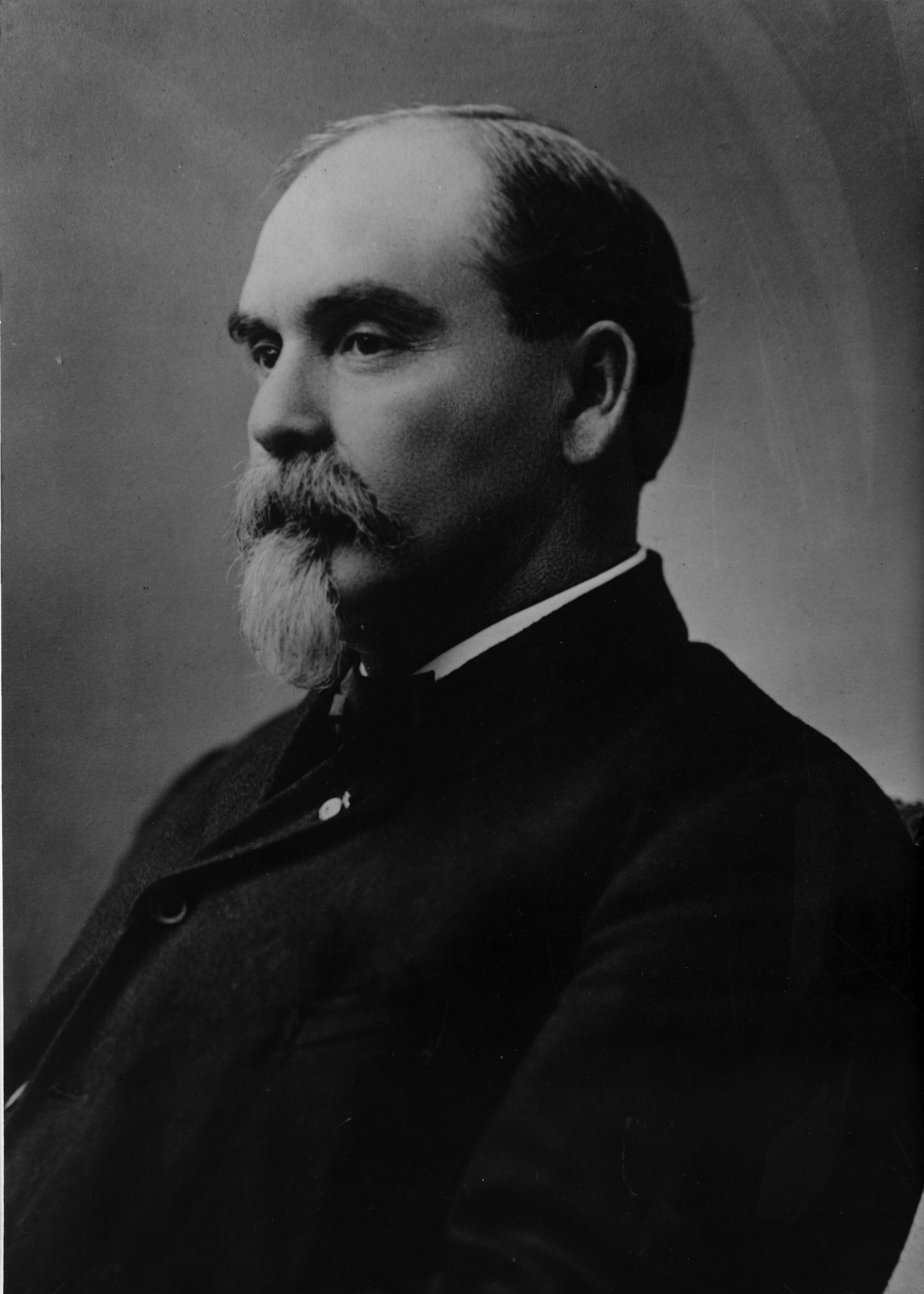

Nominee	James Cowgill	Wilbur F. Maring
Party	Democratic	Republican
Popular vote	349,510	346,377
Percentage	50.23%	49.77%
State Treasurer before election
Jacob F. Gmelich
Republican
Elected State Treasurer
James Cowgill
Democratic

The 1908 Missouri State Treasurer election was held on November 3, 1908, in order to elect the state treasurer of Missouri. Democratic nominee James Cowgill defeated Republican nominee Wilbur F. Maring.

== General election ==
On election day, November 3, 1908, Democratic nominee James Cowgill won the election by a margin of 3,133 votes against his opponent Republican nominee Wilbur F. Maring, thereby gaining Democratic control over the office of state treasurer. Cowgill was sworn in as the 22nd state treasurer of Missouri on January 11, 1909.

=== Results ===
Missouri State Treasurer election, 1908
Party	Candidate	Votes	%
Democratic	James Cowgill	349,510	50.23
Republican	Wilbur F. Maring	346,377	49.77
Total votes		695,887	100.00
Democratic gain from Republican			

== See also ==
- 1908 Missouri gubernatorial election
