= 1900 Missouri State Treasurer election =

- November 6, 1900
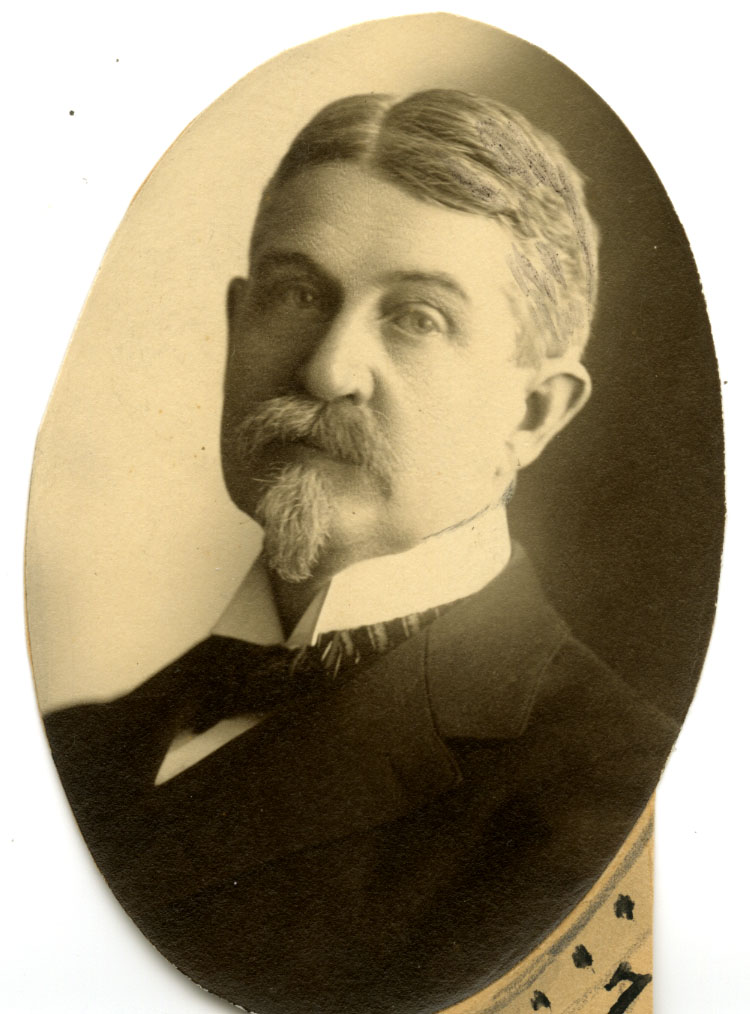

Nominee	Robert P. Williams	William S. Fleming
Party	Democratic	Republican
Popular vote	352,660	313,952
Percentage	51.57%	45.91%
State Treasurer before election
Frank L. Pitts
Democratic
Elected State Treasurer
Robert P. Williams
Democratic

The 1900 Missouri State Treasurer election was held on November 6, 1900, in order to elect the state treasurer of Missouri. Democratic nominee Robert P. Williams defeated Republican nominee William S. Fleming, Social Democratic nominee William M. Brandt, Prohibition nominee Samuel S. Allen, People's Progressive nominee DeWitt C. Fuller and Socialist Labor nominee H. M. Graber.

== General election ==
On election day, November 6, 1900, Democratic nominee Robert P. Williams won the election by a margin of 38,708 votes against his foremost opponent Republican nominee William S. Fleming, thereby retaining Democratic control over the office of state treasurer. Williams was sworn in as the 20th state treasurer of Missouri on January 14, 1901.

=== Results ===
Missouri State Treasurer election, 1900
Party	Candidate	Votes	%
Democratic	Robert P. Williams	352,660	51.57
Republican	William S. Fleming	313,952	45.91
Social Democratic	William M. Brandt	6,128	0.90
Prohibition	Samuel S. Allen	5,591	0.82
People's Progressive Party	DeWitt C. Fuller	4,264	0.62
Socialist Labor	H. M. Graber	1,302	0.18
Total votes		683,897	100.00
Democratic hold			

== See also ==
- 1900 Missouri gubernatorial election
