= 1932 Missouri Secretary of State election =

- November 8, 1932

Nominee	Dwight H. Brown	Lorenzo Dow Thompson
Party	Democratic	Republican
Popular vote	1,004,043	592,043
Percentage	62.41%	36.80%
Secretary of State before election
Charles Becker
Republican
Elected Secretary of State
Dwight H. Brown
Democratic

The 1932 Missouri Secretary of State election was held on November 8, 1932, in order to elect the secretary of state of Missouri. Democratic nominee Dwight H. Brown defeated Republican nominee and former State Treasurer of Missouri Lorenzo Dow Thompson, Socialist nominee George A. Kovaka, Communist nominee Frank Brown and Socialist Labor nominee Roland Plato.

== General election ==
On election day, November 8, 1932, Democratic nominee Dwight H. Brown won the election by a margin of 412,000 votes against his foremost opponent Republican nominee Lorenzo Dow Thompson, thereby gaining Democratic control over the office of secretary of state. Brown was sworn in as the 25th secretary of state of Missouri on January 9, 1933.

=== Results ===
Missouri Secretary of State election, 1932
Party	Candidate	Votes	%
Democratic	Dwight H. Brown	1,004,043	62.41
Republican	Lorenzo Dow Thompson	592,043	36.80
Socialist	George A. Kovaka	11,723	0.73
Communist	Frank Brown	535	0.04
Socialist Labor	Roland Plato	359	0.02
Total votes		1,608,703	100.00
Democratic gain from Republican			

== See also ==
- 1932 Missouri gubernatorial election
