= 1936 Missouri Secretary of State election =

- November 3, 1936

Nominee	Dwight H. Brown	Lorenzo Dow Thompson
Party	Democratic	Republican
Popular vote	1,097,449	709,385
Percentage	60.71%	39.24%
Secretary of State before election
Dwight H. Brown
Democratic
Elected Secretary of State
Dwight H. Brown
Democratic

The 1936 Missouri Secretary of State election was held on November 3, 1936, in order to elect the secretary of state of Missouri. Democratic nominee and incumbent secretary of state Dwight H. Brown defeated Republican nominee and former State Treasurer of Missouri Lorenzo Dow Thompson, Communist nominee John Day and Socialist Labor nominee Peter Tendler.

== General election ==
On election day, November 3, 1936, Democratic nominee Dwight H. Brown won re-election by a margin of 388,064 votes against his foremost opponent Republican nominee Lorenzo Dow Thompson, thereby retaining Democratic control over the office of secretary of state. Brown was sworn in for his second term on January 11, 1937.

=== Results ===
Missouri Secretary of State election, 1936
Party	Candidate	Votes	%
Democratic	Dwight H. Brown (incumbent)	1,097,449	60.71
Republican	Lorenzo Dow Thompson	709,385	39.24
Communist	John Day	400	0.03
Socialist Labor	Peter Tendler	385	0.02
Total votes		1,807,619	100.00
Democratic hold			

== See also ==
- 1936 Missouri gubernatorial election
