= 1912 Missouri Secretary of State election =

- November 5, 1912

Nominee	Cornelius Roach	James J. Alford	Frederick W. Niedermeyer
Party	Democratic	Republican	Progressive
Popular vote	333,736	215,144	114,677
Percentage	47.75%	30.78%	16.41%
Secretary of State before election
Cornelius Roach
Democratic
Elected Secretary of State
Cornelius Roach
Democratic

The 1912 Missouri Secretary of State election was held on November 5, 1912, in order to elect the secretary of state of Missouri. Democratic nominee and incumbent secretary of state Cornelius Roach defeated Republican nominee James J. Alford, Progressive nominee Frederick W. Niedermeyer, Socialist nominee Ernest T. Behrens, Prohibition nominee William H. Guenther and Socialist Labor nominee Clifton Holbrook.

== General election ==
On election day, November 5, 1912, Democratic nominee Cornelius Roach won re-election by a margin of 118,592 votes against his foremost opponent Republican nominee James J. Alford, thereby retaining Democratic control over the office of secretary of state. Roach was sworn in for his second term on January 13, 1913.

=== Results ===
Missouri Secretary of State election, 1912
Party	Candidate	Votes	%
Democratic	Cornelius Roach (incumbent)	333,736	47.75
Republican	James J. Alford	215,144	30.78
Progressive	Frederick W. Niedermeyer	114,677	16.41
Socialist	Ernest T. Behrens	28,334	4.05
Prohibition	William H. Guenther	5,240	0.75
Socialist Labor	Clifton Holbrook	1,835	0.26
Total votes		698,966	100.00
Democratic hold			

== See also ==
- 1912 Missouri gubernatorial election
