= 1920 Missouri State Auditor election =

- November 2, 1920

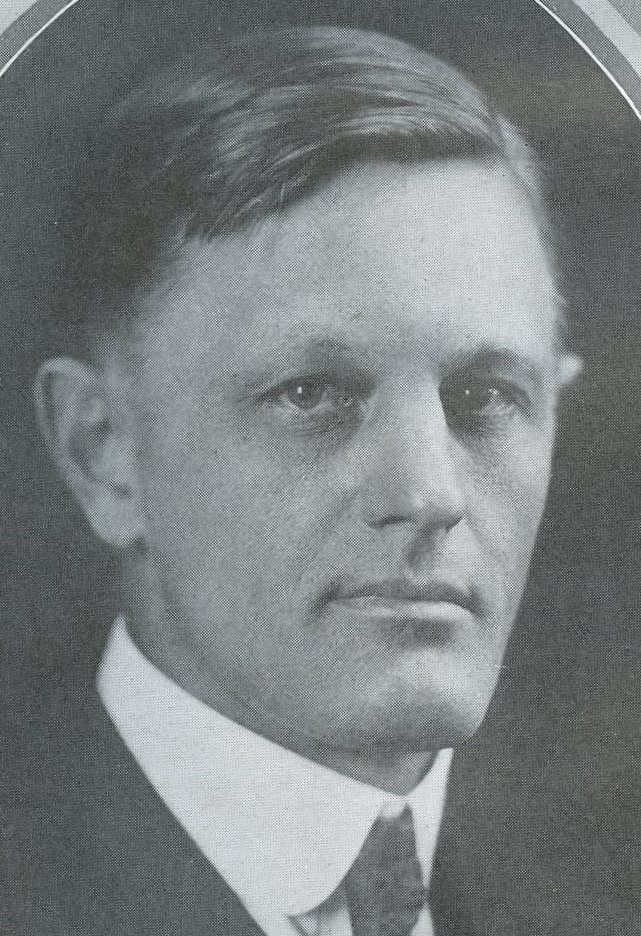
Nominee	George Ernst Hackman	George H. Middelkamp
Party	Republican	Democratic
Popular vote	728,788	573,903
Percentage	54.93%	43.26%
State Auditor before election
George Ernst Hackman
Republican
Elected State Auditor
George Ernst Hackman
Republican

The 1920 Missouri State Auditor election was held on November 2, 1920, in order to elect the state auditor of Missouri. Republican nominee and incumbent state auditor George Ernst Hackman defeated Democratic nominee and incumbent State Treasurer of Missouri George H. Middelkamp, Socialist nominee Roy F. Smalley, Farmer-Worker nominee A. R. Smith and Socialist Labor nominee Frederick Spalti.

== General election ==
On election day, November 2, 1920, Republican nominee George Ernst Hackman won re-election by a margin of 154,885 votes against his foremost opponent Democratic nominee George H. Middelkamp, thereby gaining Republican control over the office of state auditor. Hackman was sworn in for his second term on January 10, 1921.

=== Results ===
Missouri State Auditor election, 1920
Party	Candidate	Votes	%
Republican	George Ernst Hackman (incumbent)	728,788	54.93
Democratic	George H. Middelkamp	573,903	43.26
Socialist	Roy F. Smalley	19,512	1.47
Farmer–Labor	A. R. Smith	2,967	0.22
Socialist Labor	Frederick Spalti	1,634	0.12
Total votes		1,326,804	100.00
Republican hold			

== See also ==
- 1920 Missouri gubernatorial election
