= Middelkamp =

Middelkamp is a surname. Notable people with the surname include:

- George H. Middelkamp (1880–1966), American politician
- Theo Middelkamp (1914–2005), Dutch cyclist
