= 1928 Missouri State Auditor election =

- November 6, 1928
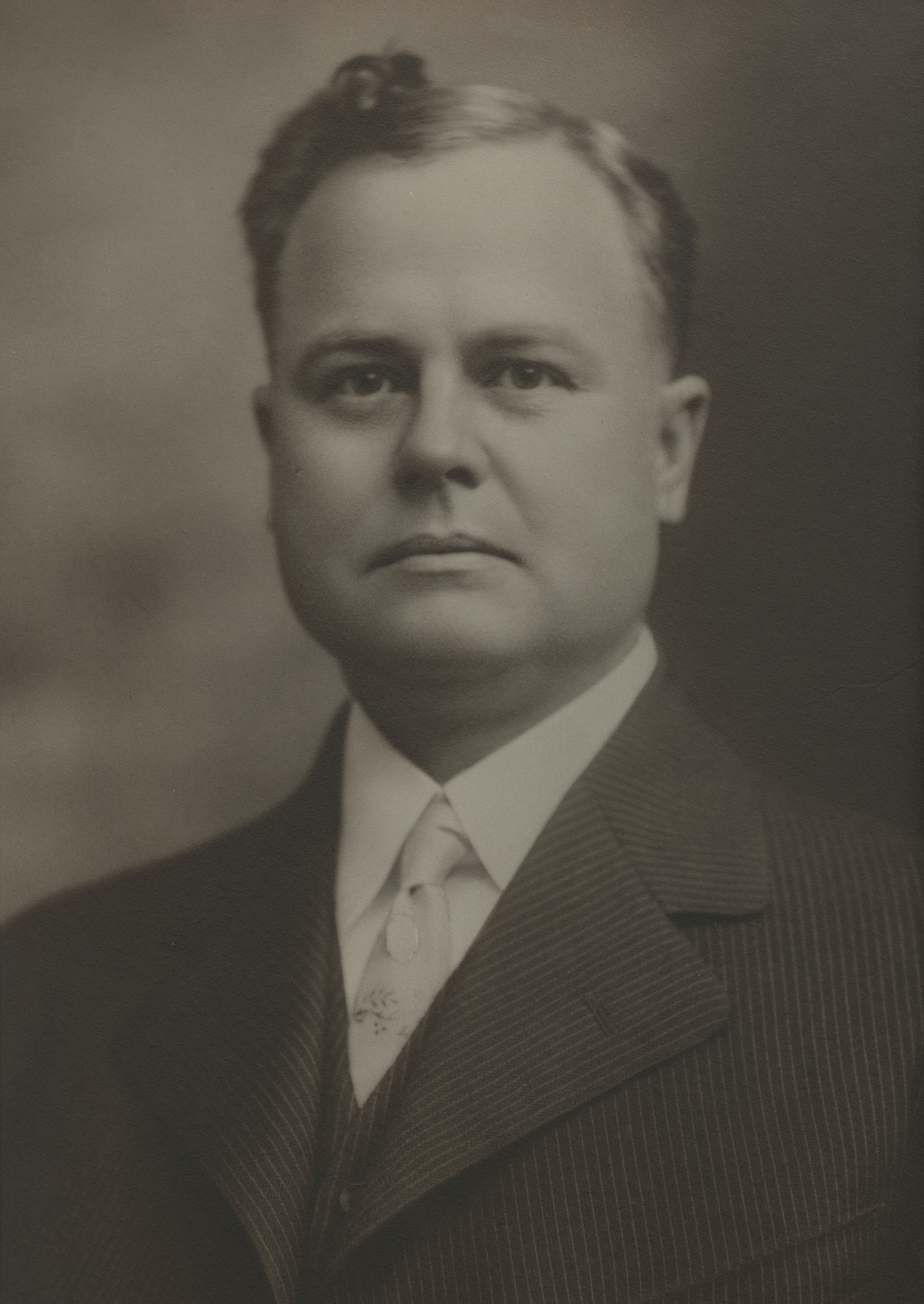

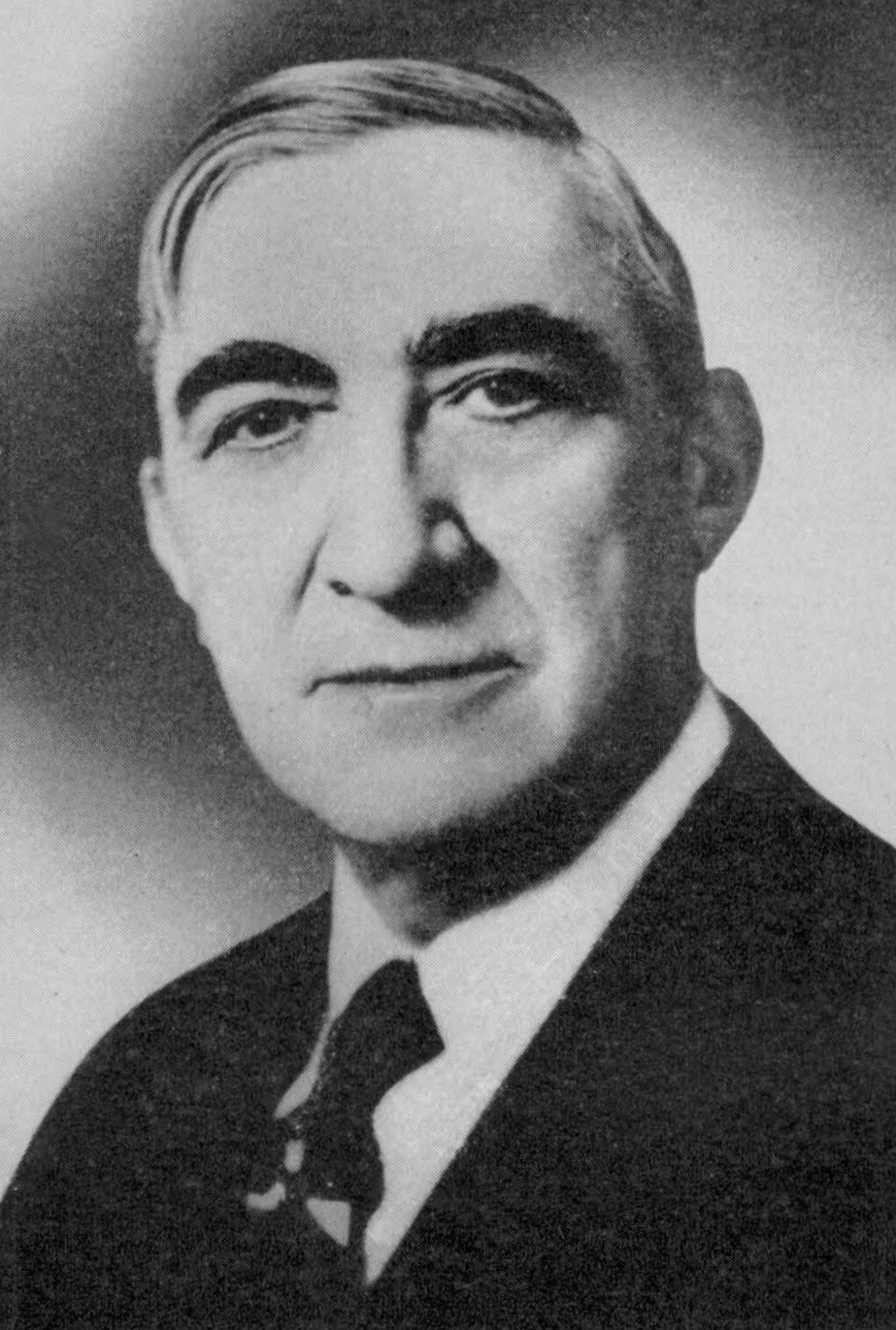
Nominee	Lorenzo Dow Thompson	Forrest Smith
Party	Republican	Democratic
Popular vote	799,053	714,527
Percentage	52.70%	47.12%
State Auditor before election
Lorenzo Dow Thompson
Republican
Elected State Auditor
Lorenzo Dow Thompson
Republican

The 1928 Missouri State Auditor election was held on November 6, 1928, in order to elect the state auditor of Missouri. Republican nominee and incumbent state auditor Lorenzo Dow Thompson defeated Democratic nominee Forrest Smith, Socialist nominee Meyer Weintraub and Socialist Labor nominee Joseph W. Molineux.

== General election ==
On election day, November 6, 1928, Republican nominee Lorenzo Dow Thompson won re-election by a margin of 84,526 votes against his foremost opponent Democratic nominee Forrest Smith, thereby retaining Republican control over the office of state auditor. Thompson was sworn in for his second term on January 14, 1929.

=== Results ===
Missouri State Auditor election, 1928
Party	Candidate	Votes	%
Republican	Lorenzo Dow Thompson (incumbent)	799,053	52.70
Democratic	Forrest Smith	714,527	47.12
Socialist	Meyer Weintraub	2,437	0.16
Socialist Labor	Joseph W. Molineux	241	0.02
Total votes		1,516,258	100.00
Republican hold			

== See also ==
- 1928 Missouri gubernatorial election
