= 1912 Missouri State Auditor election =

- November 5, 1912

Nominee	John Pemberton Gordon	William J. Mauthe	A. J. Reynolds
Party	Democratic	Republican	Progressive
Popular vote	332,606	214,627	116,204
Percentage	47.58%	30.70%	16.62%
State Auditor before election
John Pemberton Gordon
Democratic
Elected State Auditor
John Pemberton Gordon
Democratic

The 1912 Missouri State Auditor election was held on November 5, 1912, in order to elect the state auditor of Missouri. Democratic nominee and incumbent state auditor John Pemberton Gordon defeated Republican nominee William J. Mauthe, Progressive nominee A. J. Reynolds, Socialist nominee Philip Wagner, Prohibition nominee Orlando V. Wager and Socialist Labor nominee John W. Neumann.

== General election ==
On election day, November 5, 1912, Democratic nominee John Pemberton Gordon won re-election by a margin of 117,979 votes against his foremost opponent Republican nominee William J. Mauthe, thereby retaining Democratic control over the office of state auditor. Gordon was sworn in for his second term on January 13, 1913.

=== Results ===
Missouri State Auditor election, 1912
Party	Candidate	Votes	%
Democratic	John Pemberton Gordon (incumbent)	332,606	47.58
Republican	William J. Mauthe	214,627	30.70
Progressive	A. J. Reynolds	116,204	16.62
Socialist	Philip Wagner	28,211	4.04
Prohibition	Orlando V. Wager	5,515	0.79
Socialist Labor	John W. Neumann	1,854	0.27
Total votes		699,017	100.00
Democratic hold			

== See also ==
- 1912 Missouri gubernatorial election
