= John C. McKinley =

American politician

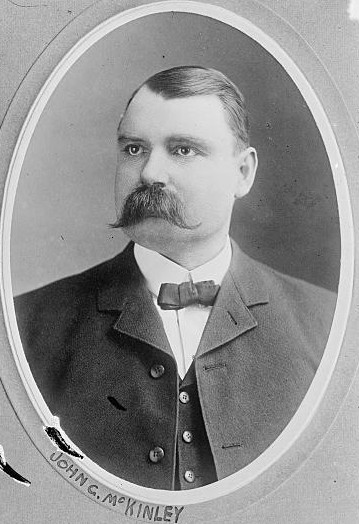

26th Lieutenant Governor of Missouri
- In office January 9, 1905 – January 11, 1909
- Governor: Joseph W. Folk
- Preceded by: Thomas L. Rubey
- Succeeded by: Jacob F. Gmelich

Member of the Missouri Senate
- In office 1902

Personal details
- Born: November 20, 1859 Putnam County, Missouri
- Died: May 1, 1927 (aged 67) Putnam County, Missouri
- Party: Republican
- Profession: Attorney

John C. McKinley (November 20, 1859 – May 1, 1927) was a lawyer and Republican politician from the state of Missouri. He was the state's 26th Lieutenant Governor as well as a member of the Missouri Senate.

== Personal history ==
John C. McKinley was born near Mendota in Putnam County, Missouri, to parents Degraphenreed and Elizabeth (Harmon) McKinley, the oldest of nine children. McKinley was a distant relative of two U.S. Presidents, James A. Garfield and William McKinley. John C. McKinley was a lawyer by profession when not engaged in politics. He married Affa Grant on May 6, 1888. McKinley died in Punam County, Missouri, on May 1, 1927, and is buried in the Unionville, Missouri, cemetery.

== Political history ==
McKinley was first elected to the Missouri Senate in 1902. However he did not serve the full four-year term, having been elected Missouri Lieutenant Governor in 1904. John C. MicKinley was an unsuccessful candidate for several other offices including U.S. Senate in 1908, 1910, and 1922. He was also a candidate for Missouri Governor in the 1912 election, losing to Elliot W. Major.

Party political offices
| Preceded by Ethelbert F. Allen | Republican nominee for Lieutenant Governor of Missouri; 1904 | Succeeded by Jacob F. Gmelich |
| Preceded by Herbert S. Hadley | Republican nominee for Governor of Missouri; 1912 | Succeeded by Henry Lamm |
Political offices
| Preceded by Thomas Lewis Rubey | Lieutenant Governor of Missouri; 1905–1909 | Succeeded by Jacob Friedrich Gmelich |
