= Albert D. Nortoni =

American lawyer

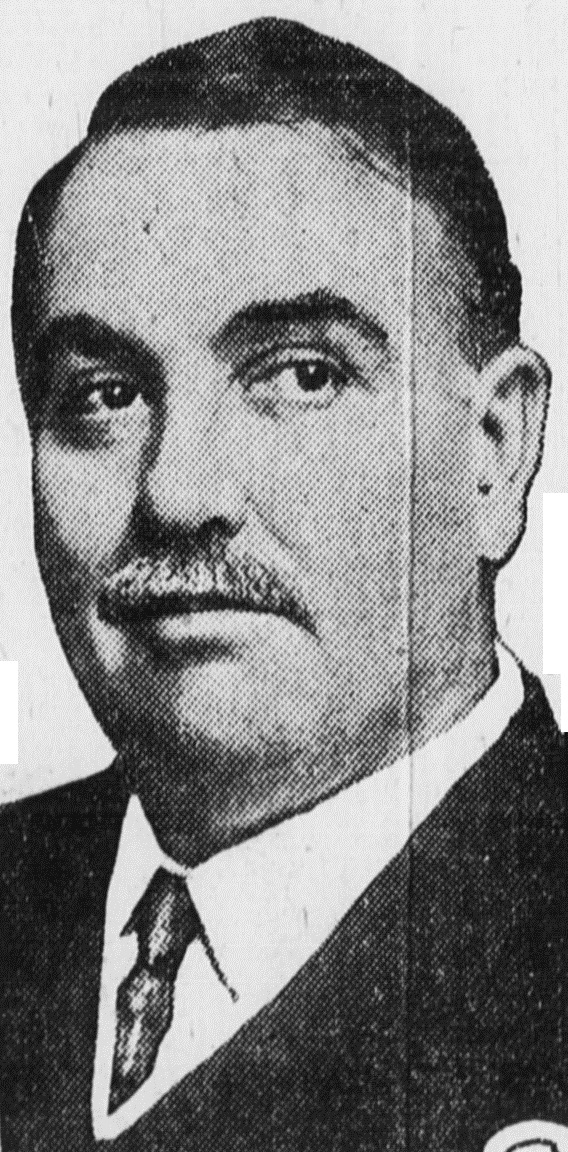
- in 1915

Progressive nominee for Governor of Missouri (1912)
- Succeeded by: Joseph P. Fontron

Personal details
- Born: January 26, 1867 New Cambria, Missouri
- Died: May 31, 1938 (aged 71)
- Party: Progressive

Albert Dexter Nortoni (January 26, 1867, to May 31, 1938) was a politician, lawyer and judge from Missouri.

== Early life and legal career ==
Albert D. Nortoni was born in New Cambria, Missouri, on January 26, 1867. He studied law in Missouri, was admitted to the Missouri Bar in 1888, and served as city attorney for New Cambria from 1891 to 1892. Nortoni served as Assistant United States District Attorney for the Eastern District of Missouri from 1903 to 1904, and then was elected judge of the Missouri Court of Appeals, Eastern District.

Nortoni married twice, first in 1892 to Maggie Lina Francis of Bevier, Missouri, and again in 1906 to Emma Belcher of Boone County, Missouri.

== Political career ==
While still serving on the Missouri Court of Appeals, Judge Nortoni was unanimously nominated as the Progressive candidate for Governor of Missouri in the 1912 election. Nortoni received 15.61% of the vote, coming in third.

Nortoni was an ardent member of the Progressive Party and a strong supporter of Theodore Roosevelt in the 1912 presidential election. In 1916, he predicted that Roosevelt would again run as the Progressive candidate, but would defeat both the Republican nominee and sitting president, Democrat Woodrow Wilson. Later however, Nortoni threw his support behind Woodrow Wilson's 1916 re-election campaign, organizing his campaign tour of Missouri, and running the Western Democratic Campaign Headquarters for the closing weeks of the 1916 campaign.

In 1918, Nortoni campaigned for the Democratic nominee for Senator from Wisconsin, Joseph E. Davies, although he ultimately lost to Irvine Lenroot.

== Education career ==
After losing the 1912 election, Nortoni was appointed by the winner, Governor Elliot Woolfolk Major, to the board of curators for the University of Missouri. He was also made a member of the managing committee for the Missouri School of Mines and Metallurgy, now the Missouri University of Science and Technology, and charged with updating the civil law code for the state of Missouri.

Party political offices
First Progressive Party established	Progressive nominee for Governor of Missouri; 1912 (lost)	Succeeded by Joseph P. Fontron
