= Robert P. Williams =

American politician (1841–1910)

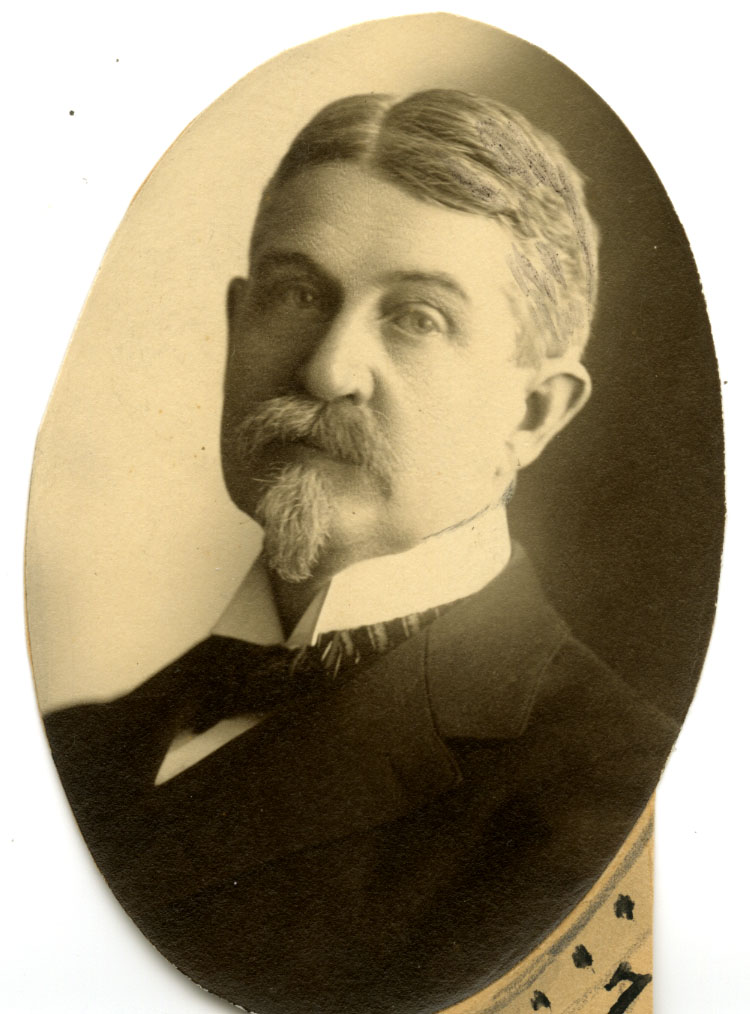
- Williams, c. 1901

State Treasurer of Missouri
- In office 1901 – January 1905
- Preceded by: Frank L. Pitts
- Succeeded by: Jacob F. Gmelich

Personal details
- Born: Robert Prewitt Williams; September 8, 1841 Howard County, Missouri, US
- Died: July 11, 1910 (aged 68) Fayette, Missouri, US
- Education: Central Methodist University; University of Missouri
- Occupation: Politician

Robert "Colonel" Prewitt Williams (September 8, 1841 – July 11, 1910) was an American politician. He served as State Treasurer of Missouri from 1901 to 1905.

== Biography ==
Williams was born on September 8, 1841, in Howard County, Missouri, to Frances E. Williams and Martha A. Talbot, both Virginia natives. His family was described as "one of the most prominent in the state" by a newspaper, as his familial relation included John Henry, a chief justice on the Supreme Court of Missouri. He studied at Central Methodist University and the University of Missouri. He lived on his family's farm until he first pursued merchantry in March 1866. He became a banker on March 1, 1871, and on February 28, 1894, was made a receiver of the American National Bank of Springfield, after a cashier defaulted on their loans; he was later named a trustee of the bank. He was a cofounder of Payne-Williams Bank, which he left in August 1906.

A Democrat, Williams won the 1900 Missouri State Treasurer election, serving State Treasurer of Missouri from 1901 to January 1905, as which he received an annual salary of $3,000. During his term, the state debt was repaid, after which Missouri citizens were given a tax cut.

Williams married Anne Maughts Overall on October 31, 1877, having seven children together, all daughters. He was a Freemason. He died on July 11, 1910, aged 68, in Fayette, Missouri, from illness, and was buried in Fayette.

Party political offices
Preceded by Frank L. Pitts	Democratic nominee for State Treasurer of Missouri; 1900	Succeeded by James Cowgill
Political offices
Preceded by Frank L. Pitts	State Treasurer of Missouri; 1901–1905	Succeeded by Jacob F. Gmelich
