= Edwin P. Deal =

American politician (1859–1945)

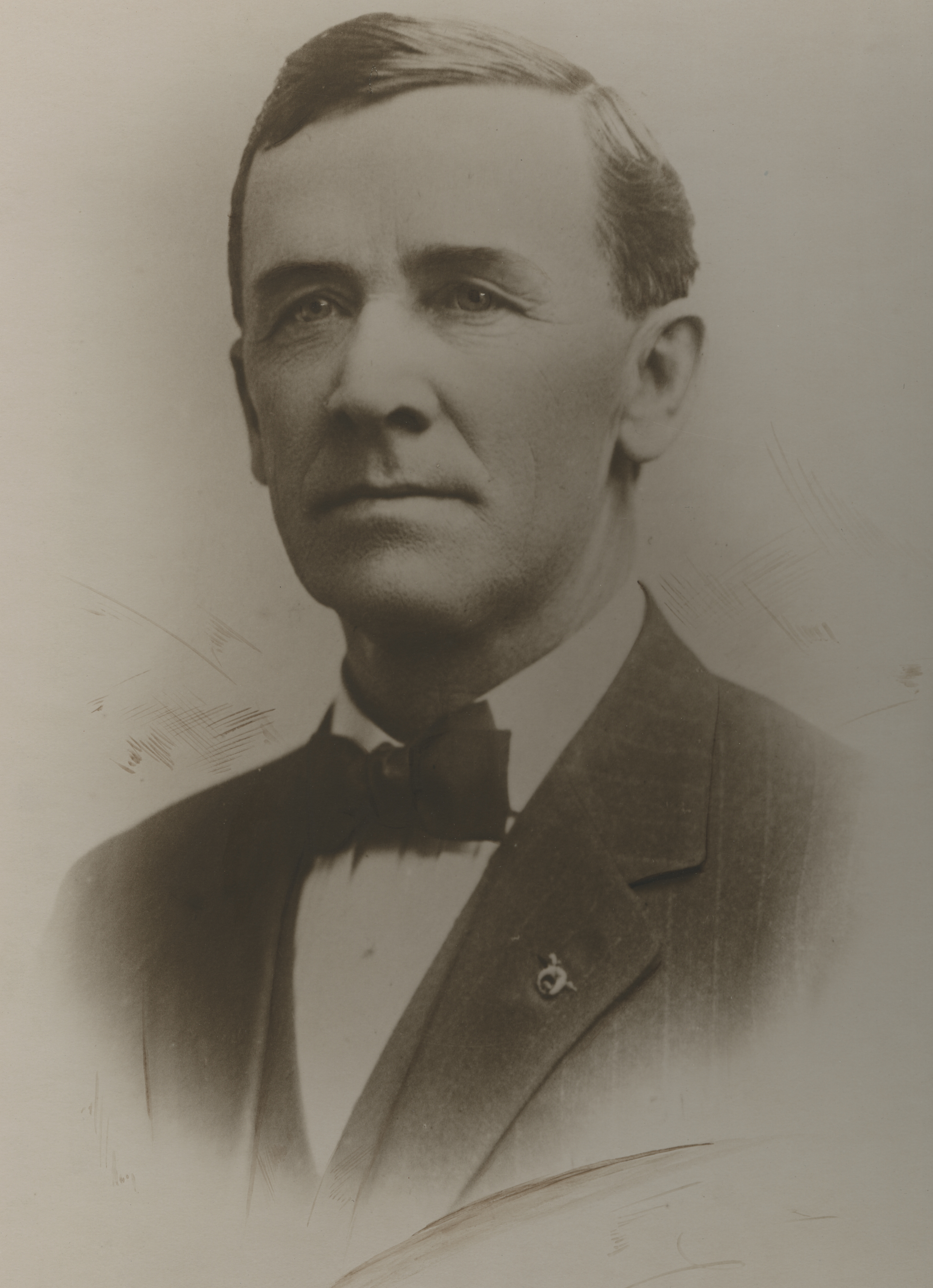
- Deal, c. 1913

State Treasurer of Missouri
- In office 1913 – January 1917
- Preceded by: James Cowgill
- Succeeded by: George H. Middelkamp

Member of the Missouri House of Representatives from the Mississippi County district
- In office 1907–1912

Personal details
- Born: Edwin Peter Deal; April 19, 1859 Charleston, Missouri, US
- Died: December 10, 1945 (aged 86) Charleston, Missouri, US
- Party: Democratic
- Occupation: Politician

Edwin Peter Deal (April 19, 1859 – December 10, 1945) was an American politician. He served as State Treasurer of Missouri from 1913 to 1917.

== Biography ==
Deal was born on April 19, 1859, in Charleston, Missouri, to Henry J. Deal and Melvina Deal (née Walters). His father was a farmer who previously served in the Missouri Senate. He attended the United States Naval Academy, later transferring to Gettysburg College. After graduating, he worked to construct the St. Louis Southwestern Railway alongside his father. After the railroad was complete, he worked as a farmer.

Politically, Deal assumed fiscal roles of government. A Democrat, he served as the treasurer and tax collector of Mississippi County, Missouri. In 1895, he was secretary of the Missouri Swamp Land Commission under Governor William J. Stone. He served in the Missouri House of Representatives from 1907 to 1912, representing Mississippi County; in the latter of his three terms, he was chairman of the House Appropriation Committee, which oversaw public budget. On August 6, 1912, he was named the Democratic nominee for State Treasurer of Missouri, winning the election in November. He served from 1913 to January 1917, and earned $3,000 per year in the position.

Deal was vice president of the Charleston Bank. He had two children with his wife, Mary Crenshaw, who he married on September 3, 1879. He died on December 10, 1945, aged 86, in Charleston, from illness. A member of the Independent Order of Odd Fellows, he was buried in the I.O.O.F. Cemetery.

Party political offices
Preceded by James Cowgill	Democratic nominee for State Treasurer of Missouri; 1912	Succeeded by George H. Middelkamp
Political offices
Preceded by James Cowgill	State Treasurer of Missouri; 1913–1917	Succeeded by George H. Middelkamp
