= Frank L. Pitts =

American politician (1841–1905)

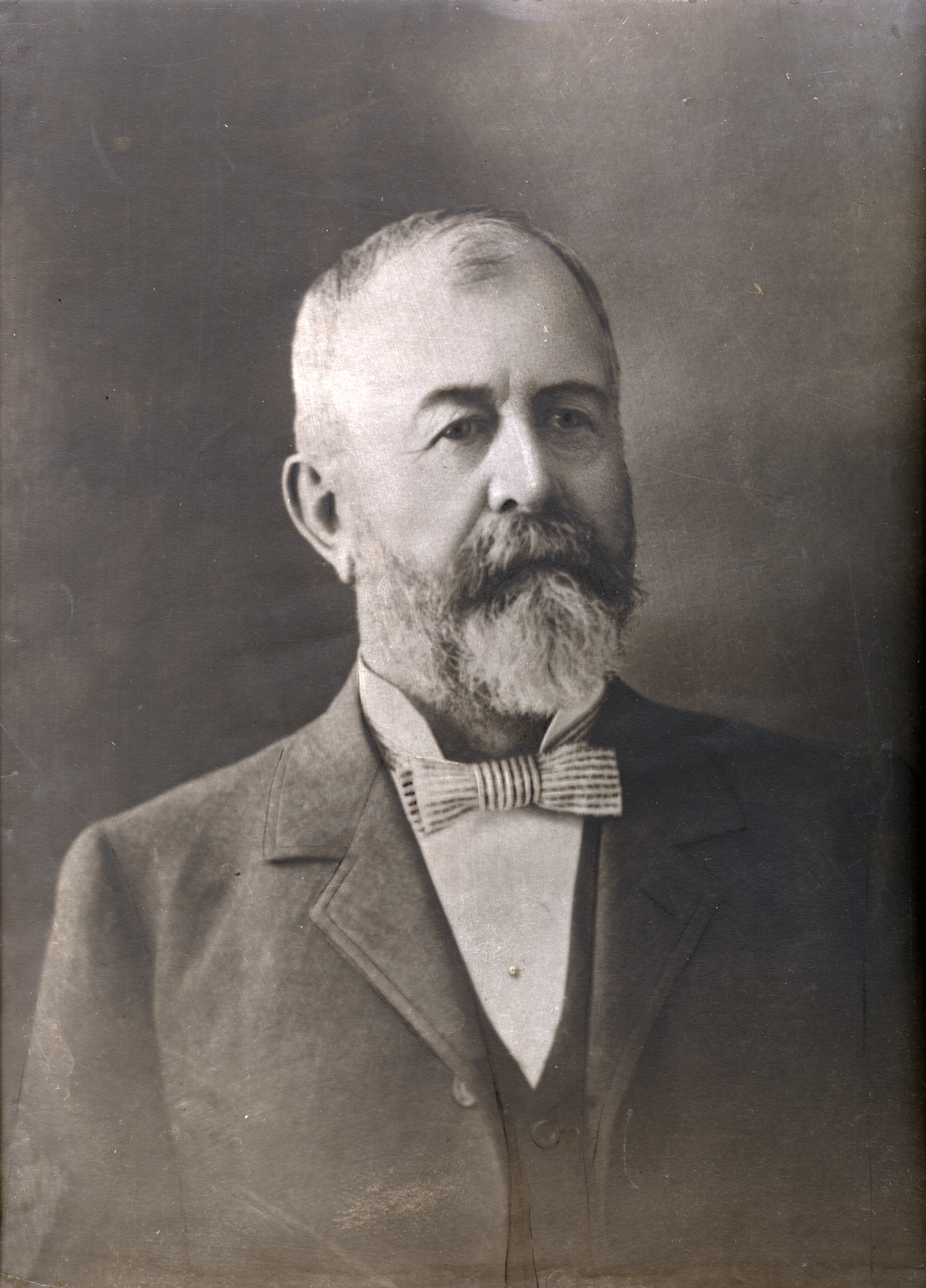

State Treasurer of Missouri
- In office 1897–1901
- Governor: William J. Stone
- Preceded by: Lawrence Vest Stephens
- Succeeded by: Robert P. Williams

Personal details
- Born: Frank Littleton Pitts; April 25, 1841 Shelby County, Missouri, US
- Died: February 4, 1905 (aged 63) San Antonio, Texas, US
- Party: Democratic

Frank Littleton Pitts (April 25, 1841 – February 4, 1905) was an American politician. He served as the State Treasurer of Missouri from 1897 to 1901.

== Biography ==
Pitts was born on April 25, 1841, in Shelby County, Missouri. He grew up in Marion County and worked as a saddler and mechanic. In spring 1861, he enlisted into the 2nd Missouri Infantry Regiment and served under Francis Cockrell. His right arm was amputated during the Battle of Franklin. He was later captured and imprisoned at Camp Chase, being released on June 13, 1865. His rank was captain. At some point he moved to Monroe County, Missouri, where he served as its sheriff and tax collector, for four years and ten years, respectively. He married Laura F. Boulware in 1875, with whom he had a daughter.

A Democrat, served as State Treasurer of Missouri from 1897 to 1901, for which he earned $3,000 per year. He was the second amputee State Treasurer, the first being Joseph Wayne Mercer, who served in the 1870s. During his two terms, Pitts decreased the public debt by $3,113,000. He was named head of the Office of Inspector of Beer and Malt Liquors in 1889, as which he managed alcohol licensing in the state.

After serving as Treasurer, Pitts became a board member of the Confederate Memorial State Historic Site, at the time an old soldiers' home. He died on February 4, 1905, aged 63, from catarrhal pneumonia, in the Menger Hotel in San Antonio. He had travelled to San Antonio three weeks prior to avoid winter and to visit his daughter. He is buried in the Walnut Grove Cemetery, in Paris, Missouri.

Party political offices
Preceded by Lawrence Vest Stephens	Democratic nominee for State Treasurer of Missouri; 1896	Succeeded by Robert P. Williams
Political offices
Preceded by Lawrence Vest Stephens	State Treasurer of Missouri; 1897–1901	Succeeded by Robert P. Williams
