= James Cowgill =

American politician (1848–1922)

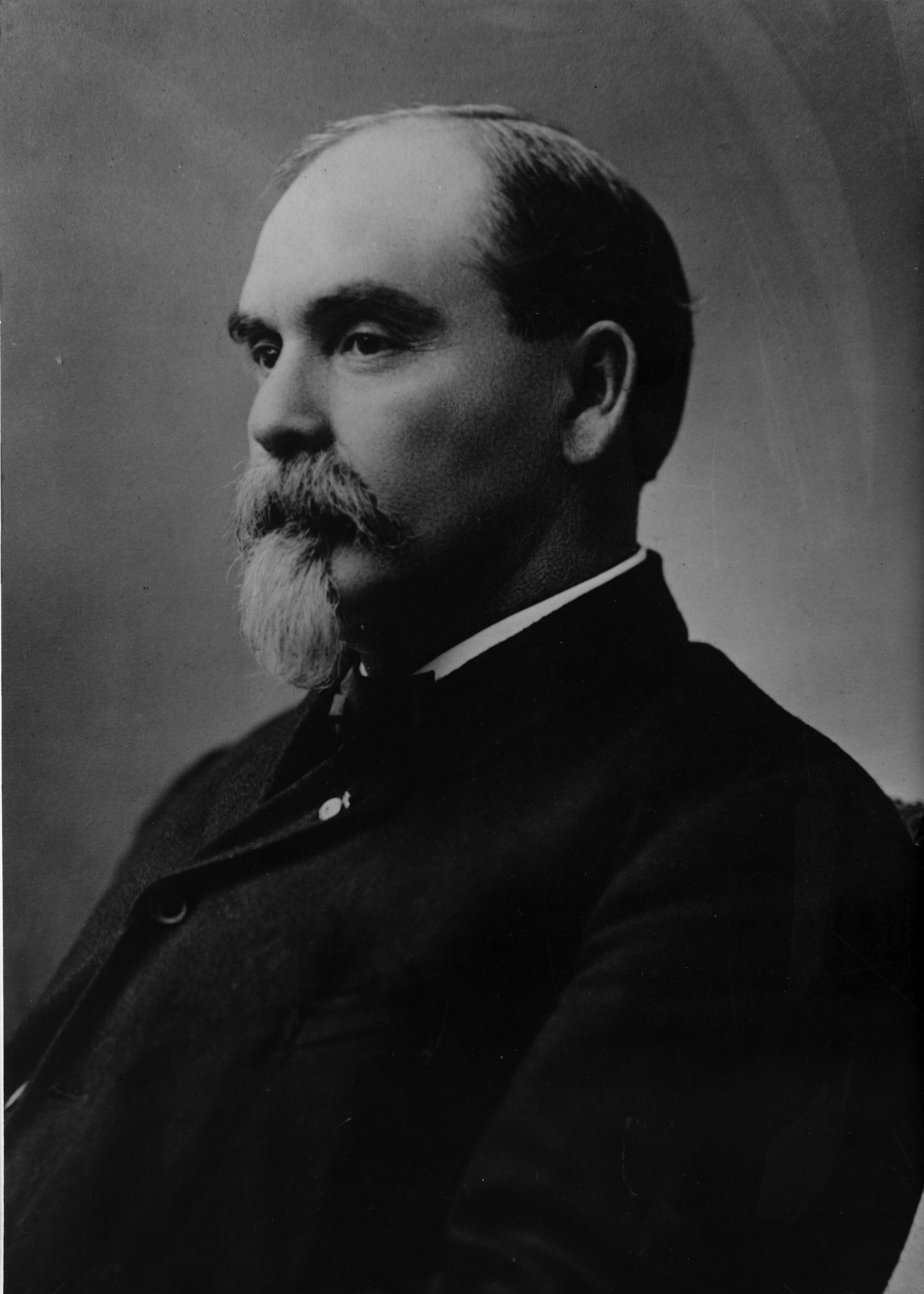

39th Mayor of Kansas City
- In office 1918 – January 20, 1922
- Preceded by: George H. Edwards
- Succeeded by: Sam B. Strother

State Treasurer of Missouri
- In office 1908–1912
- Preceded by: Jacob F. Gmelich
- Succeeded by: Edwin P. Deal

Member of the Missouri House of Representatives from the Caldwell County district
- In office 1891–1892

Personal details
- Born: April 2, 1848 Henry County, Indiana, US
- Died: January 20, 1922 (aged 73) Kansas City, Missouri, US
- Resting place: Elmwood Cemetery
- Party: Democratic

Military service
- Allegiance: United States
- Branch/service: Army
- Years of service: 1864–1865
- Unit: 9th Indiana Infantry Regiment
- Battles/wars: American Civil War

James Cowgill (April 2, 1848 – January 20, 1922) was an American politician. He served as State Treasurer of Missouri from 1908 to 1912, and as Mayor of Kansas City, Missouri from 1918 until his death in office.

== Biography ==
Cowgill was born on April 2, 1848, in Henry County, Indiana, to William M. Cowgill and Roda Cowgill. A Unionist, he enlisted with the 9th Indiana Infantry Regiment during the American Civil War, serving from October 7, 1864, to September 28, 1865. He married Ella Myers on September 22, 1867, with whom he had four children. In August 1868, he moved onto a farm in unincorporated Caldwell County, Missouri; his property and the surrounding area was eventually developed into the city Cowgill, Missouri. He was elected Caldwell County's judge in 1882, then its treasurer in 1900.

A Democrat, Cowgill served in the Missouri House of Representatives from 1891 to 1892, representing Caldwell Countywell County. From 1893 to 1897, he served as the Missouri Railroad and Warehouse Commissioner. He served as State Treasurer of Missouri from 1908 to 1912, a position he was paid $3,000 annually to perform.

Cowgill was a board member of the Democratic State Central Committee, then a board member of the Kansas City Board of Elections, in 1916 and 1917, respectively. On November 22, 1916, he was charged with bribery after he sent letters to mailmen to obtain money from them, in exchange for the passage of law benefitting mail services.

Beginning in 1918, Cowgill served as mayor of Kansas City, Missouri; he had moved to the city in 1913 and previously worked as an insurance executive. He died while at his desk while giving a conference given to Leon Milton Birkhead and others at Kansas City Hall, on January 20, 1922, aged 73, from an intracerebral hemorrhage. One hour prior, a City Clerk clerk also died of a ruptured organ. Cowgill is the only Mayor Of Kansas City to have died in office. He is buried in Elmwood Cemetery.

Party political offices
Preceded by Robert P. Williams	Democratic nominee for State Treasurer of Missouri; 1904, 1908	Succeeded by Edwin P. Deal
Political offices
Preceded by Jacob F. Gmelich	State Treasurer of Missouri; 1909–1913	Succeeded by Edwin P. Deal
Preceded by George H. Edwards	Mayor of Kansas City, Missouri; 1918–1922	Succeeded by Sam B. Strother
