= Jacob F. Gmelich =

American politician (1839–1914)

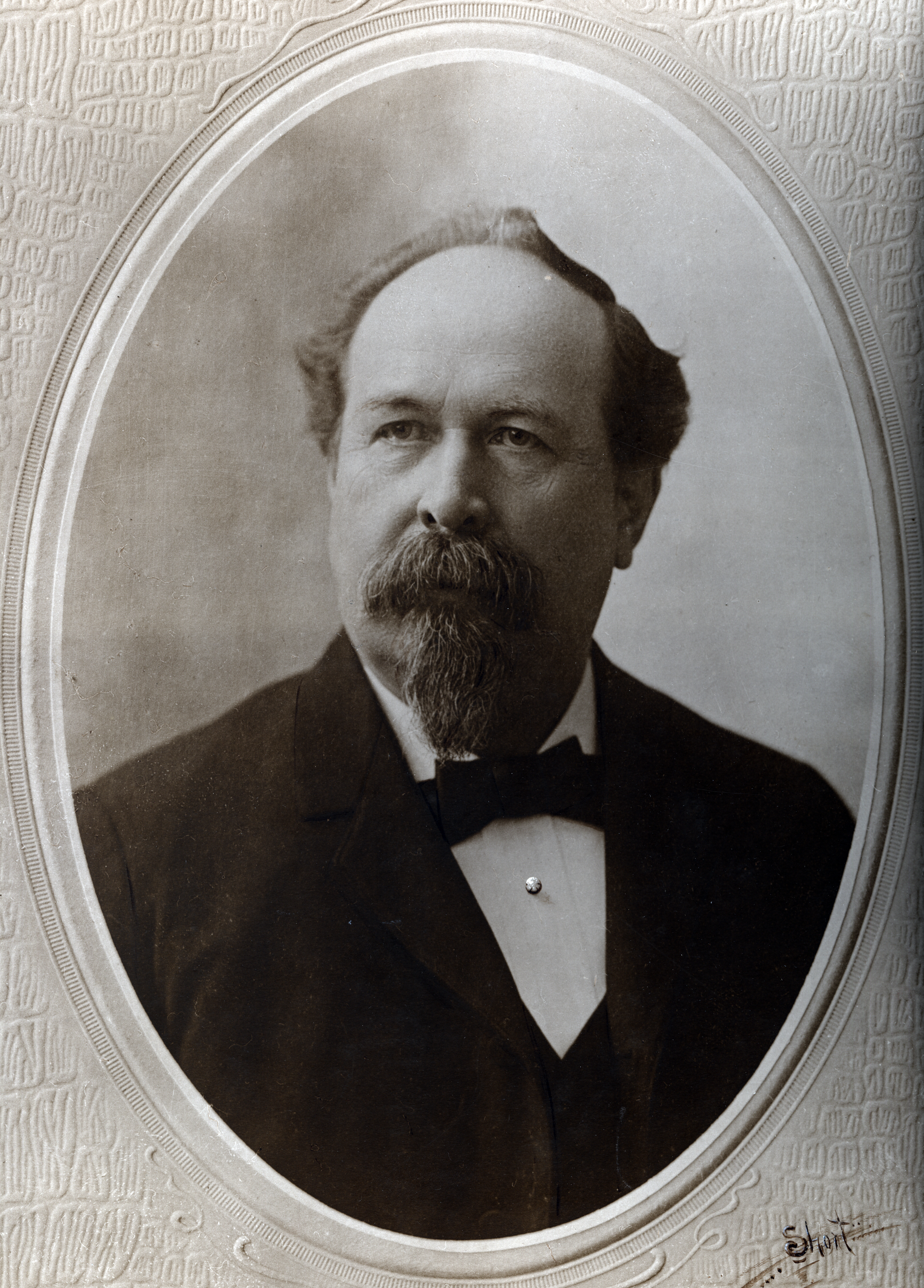
- Gmelich, c. 1904–1905

27th Lieutenant Governor of Missouri
- In office 1909–1913
- Preceded by: John C. McKinley
- Succeeded by: William Rock Painter

State Treasurer of Missouri
- In office January 1, 1905, – January 1, 1909
- Preceded by: Robert P. Williams
- Succeeded by: James Cowgill

Member of the Missouri House of Representatives from the Cooper County district
- In office 1895–1896

Personal details
- Born: Jacob Friedrich Gmelich Jr. July 23, 1839 Württemberg, German Confederation
- Died: February 21, 1914 (aged 74) Boonville, Missouri, US
- Party: Republican
- Occupation: Politician

Jacob Friedrich Gmelich Jr. (July 23, 1839 – February 21, 1914) was an American politician. He served as State Treasurer of Missouri from 1905 to 1909, and as Lieutenant Governor of Missouri from 1909 to 1913.

== Biography ==
Gmelich was born on July 23, 1839, in Wurtemberg, to Jacob Gmelich Sr. and Barbara Gmelich (née Walter). His family immigrated to the United States, first settling in Ohio, then in 1852, they moved to Peru, Illinois. Following his education, he worked as a watchmaker. He relocated to Chicago in 1856, and to St. Louis in 1858. Beginning in May 1861, he was a jeweler in Boonville, Missouri. He also served eight terms as mayor of the city, and was a member of its board of education and president of its bank. During the American Civil War, he joined the Home Guard, a Unionist militia.

A Republican, Gmelich served Cooper County in the Missouri House of Representatives in 1895 and 1896. In 1900, he was a delegate of the Republican National Convention. He served as State Treasurer of Missouri from January 1, 1905, to January 1, 1909, as which his annual salary was $3,000. While treasurer, he sought reforms to the position. He subsequently served as Lieutenant Governor of Missouri to Herbert S. Hadley, from 1909 to 1913. The votes in his election for Lieutenant Governor were recounted due to a push from the Democratic-majority Missouri General Assembly; he won by around 150 votes. As an elected official, he was praised by both supporters and opposition for his integrity.

After his tenures ended, Gmelich returned to watchmaking in Boonville, operating alongside his son-in-law, Maximilian E. Schmidt, beginning in 1803. His wife was fellow German immigrant Dorris Mueller, who he married on May 8, 1861; they had no children, though raised an adopted daughter. He died on February 21, 1914, aged 74, in Boonville, from a pneumothorax, caused by pneumonia in 1912. At the time of his death, he and his wife's house was being built. He was buried at Walnut Grove Cemetery, in Boonville. The Missouri Senate commemorated him following his death.

Party political offices
Preceded by Frederick J. Wilson	Republican nominee for State Treasurer of Missouri; 1896	Succeeded by William S. Fleming
Preceded by William S. Fleming	Republican nominee for State Treasurer of Missouri; 1904	Succeeded by Wilbur F. Maring
Preceded by John C. McKinley	Republican nominee for Lieutenant Governor of Missouri; 1908	Succeeded by Hiram Lloyd
Political offices
Preceded by Robert P. Williams	State Treasurer of Missouri; 1905–1909	Succeeded by James Cowgill
Preceded by John C. McKinley	Lieutenant Governor of Missouri; 1909–1913	Succeeded by William R. Painter
