= 1912 Missouri gubernatorial election =

- November 5, 1912
- Turnout: 21.23% (▼1.81%)
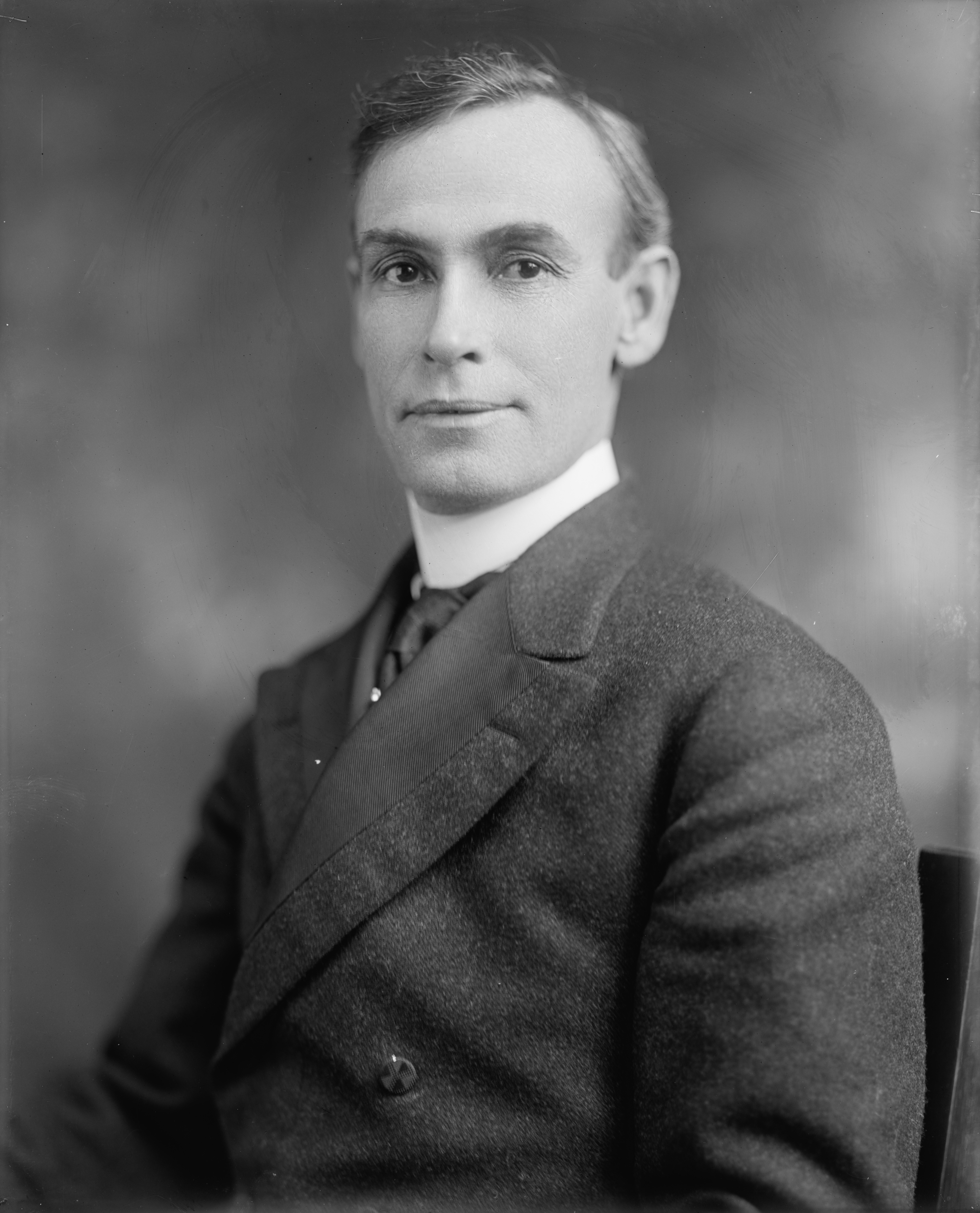

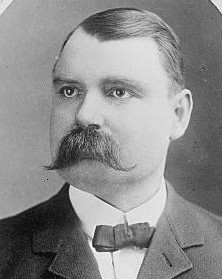

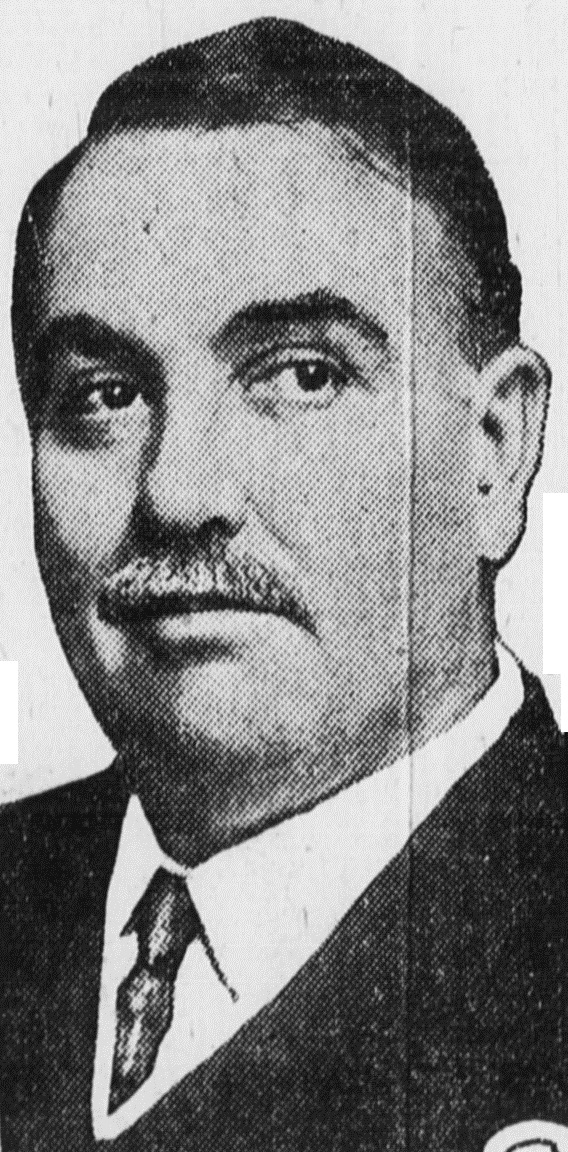
Nominee	Elliott Woolfolk Major	John C. McKinley	Albert D. Nortoni
Party	Democratic	Republican	Progressive
Popular vote	337,019	217,819	109,146
Percentage	48.20%	31.15%	15.61%
- County results Major: 30–40% 40–50% 50–60% 60–70% 70–80% 80–90% McKinley: 30–40% 40–50% 50–60% 60–70% Nortoni: 30–40%
Governor before election
Herbert S. Hadley
Republican
Elected Governor
Elliott Woolfolk Major
Democratic

The 1912 Missouri gubernatorial election was held on November 5, 1912, and resulted in a victory for the Democratic nominee, Missouri Attorney General Elliott Woolfolk Major, over the Republican candidate, former Lt. Gov. John C. McKinley, Progressive Albert D. Nortoni, and candidates representing the Socialist, Prohibition, and Socialist Labor parties. Major defeated former representative William S. Cowherd and former lieutenant governor August Bolte for his party's nomination, while McKinley defeated former representative Arthur P. Murphy and former Secretary of State John Ephraim Swanger.

== Results ==
County Results of the Progressive Party: Nortoni: 0-5%; 5-10%; 10-15%; 15-20%; 20-25%; 25-30%; 30-35%

1912 gubernatorial election, Missouri
Party	Candidate	Votes	%	±%
Democratic	Elliott Woolfolk Major	337,019	48.20	+0.69
Republican	John C. McKinley	217,819	31.15	−18.58
Progressive	Albert D. Nortoni	109,146	15.61	+15.61
Socialist	William A. Ward	28,145	4.03	+2.00
Prohibition	Charles E. Stokes	5,591	0.75	+0.17
Socialist Labor	Charles Rogers	1,442	0.27	+0.27
Majority		119,200	17.05	+14.83
Turnout		699,210	21.23	
Democratic gain from Republican		Swing		
