= George H. Middelkamp =

American politician (1880–1966)

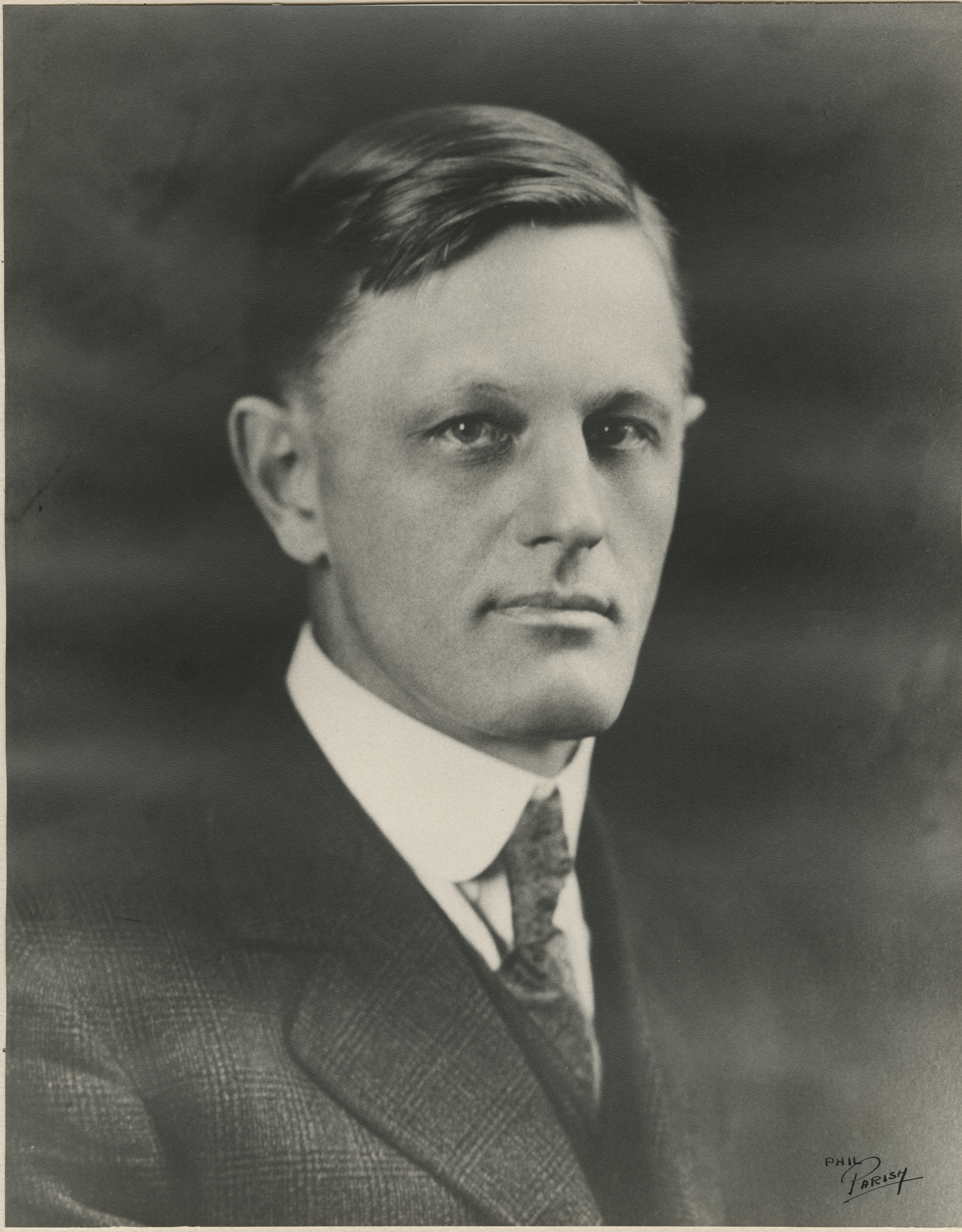
- Middelkamp, c. 1917

24th Treasurer of Missouri
- In office 1917–1921
- Governor: Frederick D. Gardner
- Preceded by: Edwin P. Deal
- Succeeded by: Lorenzo Dow Thompson

Personal details
- Born: George Herman Middelkamp; April 20, 1880 Warrenton, Missouri, U.S.
- Died: October 5, 1966 (aged 86) St. Louis, Missouri, U.S.
- Party: Democratic
- Spouse: Clara M. Ordelheide (m. 1904; died 1938)
- Children: 2

George Herman Middelkamp (April 20, 1880 – October 5, 1966) was an American politician. He served as the State Treasurer of Missouri from 1917 to 1921.

== Biography ==
Middelkamp was born on April 20, 1880, in Warrenton, Missouri, to John Herman Middelkamp and Mary Otillie Middelkamp (née Gerdemann). He studied at Central Wesleyan College and afterward worked as a tinsmith for his father's hardware store. From 1906 to 1916, he was a cashier for the Bank of Hawk Point, resigning after the Democratic Party nominated him for State Treasurer of Missouri. He was the first person from Lincoln County, Missouri to be nominated for a state office.

Prior to become State Treasurer, Middelkamp was member of the Democratic state committee from the 9th congressional district since the 1910s. The Democratic nominee for State Treasurer, he was elected in November 1916 and served from 1917 to 1921, being paid $3,000 per year in the position. During his tenure, the State Treasury gained the authority to oversee inheritance and corporation franchise taxes. Because of this, he hired five extra employees to the Treasury, an increase from five.

After his tenure, Middelkamp was the Democratic nominee for State Auditor of Missouri in 1920 and 1924, losing both times to George E. Hackmann. He moved to the Kansas City metropolitan area, where he worked for loan companies. On November 30, 1904, he married Clara M. Ordelheide, with whom he had two children. He retired in 1947, dying on October 5, 1966, aged 86, in St. Louis. He is buried in Mount Moriah Cemetery, in Kansas City.

== Electoral history ==
George H. Middelkamp electoral history

1916 Missouri Treasurer election
Party	Candidate	Votes	%	±%
Democratic	George H. Middelkamp	395,391	50.27%	+2.70%
Republican	Lorenzo Dow Thompson	372,609	47.37%	+16.53%
Socialist	J. F. Harlow	14,678	1.87%	−2.18%
Prohibition	Ed Brandt	3,856	0.49%	−0.26%
Total votes		'786,534'	'100.00%'	

1920 Missouri Auditor election
Party	Candidate	Votes	%	±%
Republican	George E. Hackmann (incumbent)	728,788	54.93%	+5.60%
Democratic	George H. Middelkamp	573,903	43.26%	−4.91%
Socialist	Roy F. Smalley	19,512	1.47%	−0.42%
Farmer–Labor	A. R. Smith	2,967	0.22%	+0.22%
Socialist Labor	Frederick Spalti	1,634	0.12%	+0.00%
Total votes		'1,326,804'	'100.00%'	

1924 Missouri Auditor election
Party	Candidate	Votes	%	±%
Republican	George E. Hackmann	648,910	50.50%	−4.43%
Democratic	George H. Middelkamp	613,210	47.73%	+4.47%
Socialist	A. B. Griep	22,146	1.72%	+0.25%
Socialist Labor	Henry Knobel	595	0.05%	−0.07%
Total votes		'1,284,861'	'100.00%'	

Party political offices
Preceded by Edwin P. Deal	Democratic nominee for State Treasurer of Missouri; 1916	Succeeded by John H. Stone
Preceded by John Pemberton Gordon	Democratic nominee for Auditor of Missouri; 1920, 1924	Succeeded by Forrest Smith
Political offices
Preceded by Edwin P. Deal	State Treasurer of Missouri; 1917–1921	Succeeded by Lorenzo Dow Thompson
