= Lorenzo Dow Thompson (treasurer) =

American politician (1873–1951)

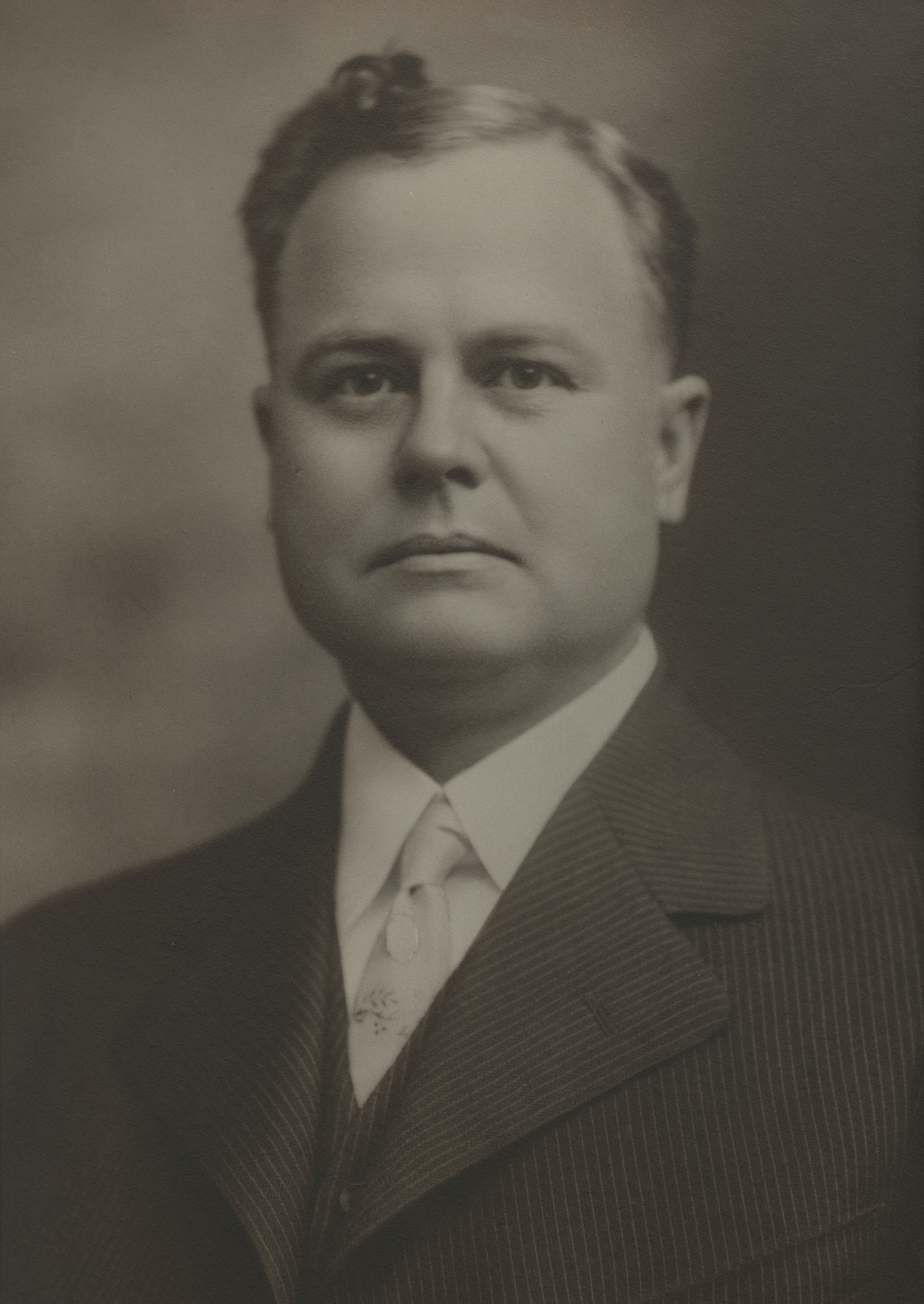
- Thompson, c. 1916

State Treasurer of Missouri
- In office 1921–1925
- Governor: Arthur M. Hyde
- Preceded by: George H. Middelkamp
- Succeeded by: C. Eugene Stephens

State Auditor of Missouri
- In office 1925–1933
- Preceded by: George Ernst Hackman
- Succeeded by: Forrest Smith

Personal details
- Born: November 22, 1873 Vandalia, Missouri, US
- Died: October 1, 1951 (aged 77) Jefferson City, Missouri, US
- Party: Republican

Lorenzo Dow Thompson (November 22, 1873 – October 1, 1951) was an American politician. He served as the State Treasurer of Missouri from 1921 to 1925, and as State Auditor of Missouri from 1925 to 1933.

== Biography ==
Thompson was born on November 22, 1873, near Vandalia, Missouri, to Andrew Lewis Thompson and Drusilla (née Branstetter) Thompson. In 1886, he and his family moved to Callaway County, Missouri. Following his education at Callaway County public schools, he operated a general store in New Bloomfield for 23 years.

A Republican, Thompson was appointed as New Bloomfield's postmaster on October 27, 1897, by William McKinley, a position which he served as for seventeen years. He was nominated for State Treasurer of Missouri on August 3, 1920, winning the election on November 2. He served from 1921 to 1925, earning $3,000 per year in the position. He employed 16 people under him, including a blind clerk. He installed new equipment to the State Treasury, costing $12,000 – $10,000 being allocated at the beginning of his term, with $2,000 extra being granted in 1923. After losing a re-election, he served as State Auditor of Missouri, from 1925 to 1933. In 1936 and 1944, he was the Republican candidate for Secretary of State of Missouri, losing both elections.

Thompson married Ellen Rebecca Bryan on November 27, 1901, and they had two children together. He was a member of numerous fraternal organizations, including the Knights of the Maccabees and the Knights of Pythias. He died on October 1, 1951, aged 77, in Jefferson City, Missouri.

Party political offices
Preceded by Daniel H. Hoefer	Republican nominee for State Treasurer of Missouri; 1916, 1920	Succeeded by C. Eugene Stephens
Preceded by George Ernst Hackman	Republican nominee for State Auditor of Missouri; 1924, 1928	Succeeded by George Ernst Hackman
Preceded by Charles U. Becker	Republican nominee for Secretary of State of Missouri; 1932, 1936	Succeeded by Loyd "Boots" Miller
Political offices
Preceded by George H. Middelkamp	State Treasurer of Missouri; 1921–1925	Succeeded by C. Eugene Stephens
