= 1896 Missouri State Auditor election =

- November 3, 1896
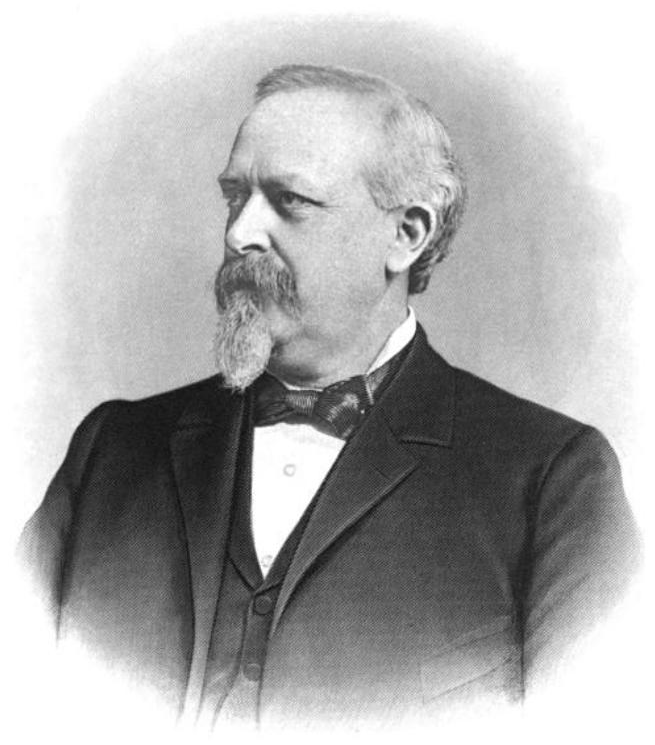

| Nominee | James M. Seibert | John G. Bishop |
| Party | Democratic | Republican |
| Popular vote | 340,803 | 304,583 |
| Percentage | 50.55% | 45.18% |
State Auditor before election
James M. Seibert
Democratic
Elected State Auditor
James M. Seibert
Democratic

The 1896 Missouri State Auditor election was held on November 3, 1896, in order to elect the state auditor of Missouri. Democratic nominee and incumbent state auditor James M. Seibert defeated Republican nominee John G. Bishop, People's nominee Sheridan Webster, Prohibition nominee John O. Rolfe, National Democratic nominee Edward D. Porter and Socialist Labor nominee James A. Randall.

== General election ==
On election day, November 3, 1896, Democratic nominee James M. Seibert won re-election by a margin of 36,220 votes against his foremost opponent Republican nominee John G. Bishop, thereby retaining Democratic control over the office of state auditor. Seibert was sworn in for his third term on January 11, 1897.

=== Results ===
Missouri State Auditor election, 1896
| Party | Candidate | Votes | % |
|---|---|---|---|
| Democratic | James M. Seibert (incumbent) | 340,803 | 50.55 |
| Republican | John G. Bishop | 304,583 | 45.18 |
| Populist | Sheridan Webster | 23,907 | 3.55 |
| Prohibition | John O. Rolfe | 2,275 | 0.34 |
| National Democratic | Edward D. Porter | 1,941 | 0.29 |
| Socialist Labor | James A. Randall | 635 | 0.09 |
| Total votes | | 674,144 | 100.00 |
| Democratic hold | | | |

== See also ==
- 1896 Missouri gubernatorial election
