= 1900 Missouri State Auditor election =

- November 6, 1900

Nominee	Albert Otis Allen	William F. Bloebaum
Party	Democratic	Republican
Popular vote	352,823	313,831
Percentage	51.58%	45.88%
State Auditor before election
James M. Seibert
Democratic
Elected State Auditor
Albert Otis Allen
Democratic

The 1900 Missouri State Auditor election was held on November 6, 1900, in order to elect the state auditor of Missouri. Democratic nominee Albert Otis Allen defeated Republican nominee William F. Bloebaum, Social Democratic nominee L. M. Richeson, Prohibition nominee Orange J. Hill, People's Progressive nominee Benjamin F. Allen and Socialist Labor nominee Charles Wippermann.

== General election ==
On election day, November 6, 1900, Democratic nominee Albert Otis Allen won the election by a margin of 38,992 votes against his foremost opponent Republican nominee William F. Bloebaum, thereby retaining Democratic control over the office of state auditor. Allen was sworn in as the 20th state auditor of Missouri on January 14, 1901.

=== Results ===
Missouri State Auditor election, 1900
Party	Candidate	Votes	%
Democratic	Albert Otis Allen	352,823	51.58
Republican	William F. Bloebaum	313,831	45.88
Social Democratic	L. M. Richeson	6,133	0.90
Prohibition	Orange J. Hill	5,573	0.82
People's Progressive Party	Benjamin F. Allen	4,385	0.64
Socialist Labor	Charles Wippermann	1,291	0.18
Total votes		684,036	100.00
Democratic hold			

== See also ==
- 1900 Missouri gubernatorial election
