= 1888 Missouri State Treasurer election =

- November 6, 1888
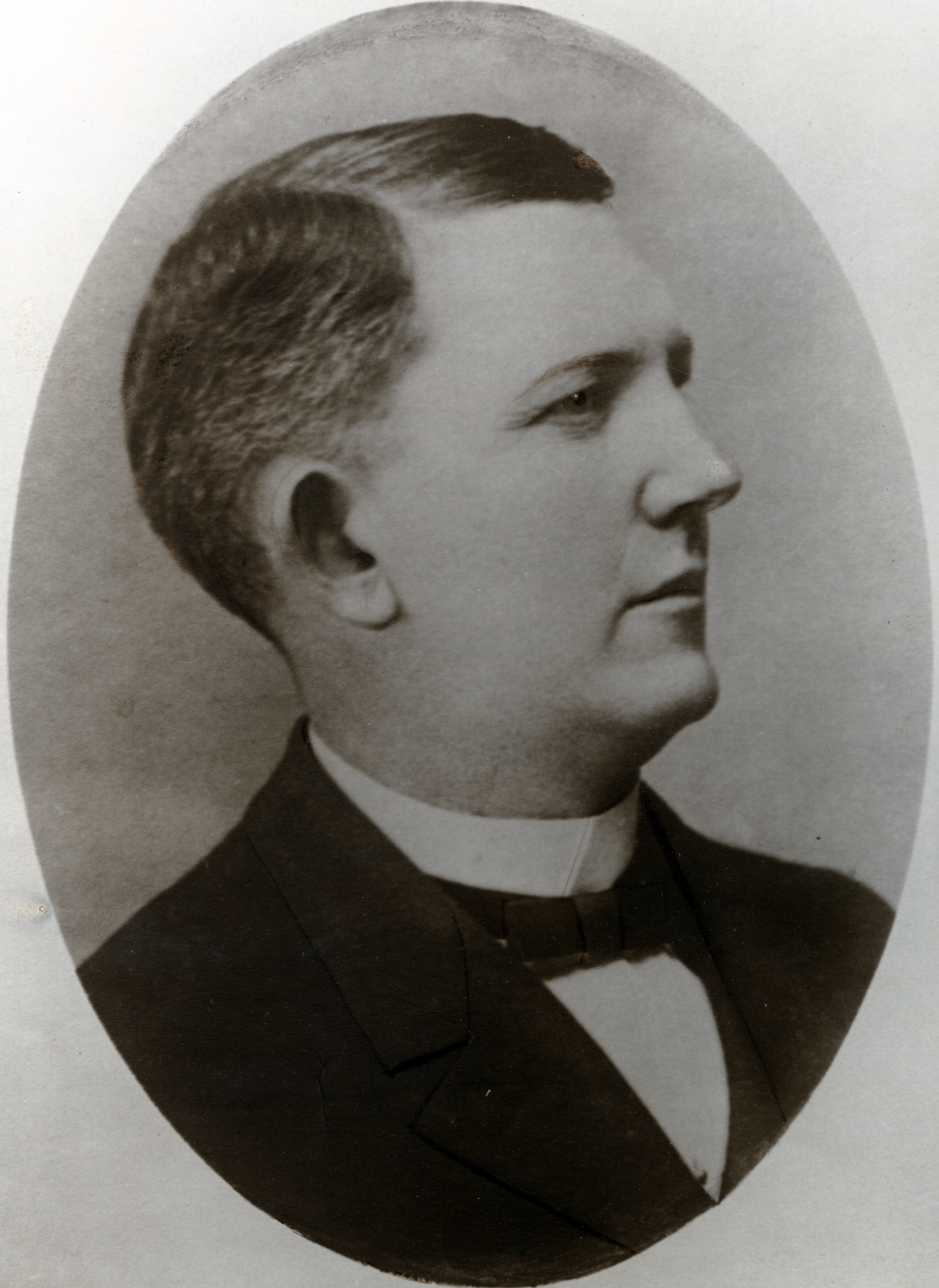

Nominee	Edward T. Noland	A. B. Frowein
Party	Democratic	Republican
Popular vote	261,744	236,680
Percentage	50.16%	45.36%
State Treasurer before election
James M. Seibert
Democratic
Elected State Treasurer
Edward T. Noland
Democratic

The 1888 Missouri State Treasurer election was held on November 6, 1888, in order to elect the state treasurer of Missouri. Democratic nominee Edward T. Noland defeated Republican nominee A. B. Frowein, Union Labor nominee and former member of the Minnesota House of Representatives Warren Vertress and Prohibition nominee William H. Craig.

== General election ==
On election day, November 6, 1888, Democratic nominee Edward T. Noland won the election by a margin of 25,064 votes against his foremost opponent Republican nominee A. B. Frowein, thereby retaining Democratic control over the office of state treasurer. Noland was sworn in as the 17th state treasurer of Missouri on January 14, 1889.

=== Results ===
Missouri State Treasurer election, 1888
Party	Candidate	Votes	%
Democratic	Edward T. Noland	261,744	50.16
Republican	A. B. Frowein	236,680	45.36
Union Labor	Warren Vertress	18,890	3.62
Prohibition	William H. Craig	4,526	0.86
Total votes		521,840	100.00
Democratic hold			

== See also ==
- 1888 Missouri gubernatorial election
