= 1900 Missouri Secretary of State election =

- November 6, 1900

Nominee	Sam Baker Cook	Walter L. Porterfield
Party	Democratic	Republican
Popular vote	352,747	313,872
Percentage	51.58%	45.90%
Secretary of State before election
Alexander A. Lesueur
Democratic
Elected Secretary of State
Sam Baker Cook
Democratic

The 1900 Missouri Secretary of State election was held on November 6, 1900, in order to elect the secretary of state of Missouri. Democratic nominee Sam Baker Cook defeated Republican nominee Walter L. Porterfield, Social Democratic nominee William H. Strife, Prohibition nominee Elbridge H. Benham, People's Progressive nominee Bernard Finn and Socialist Labor nominee Edward Heitzig.

== General election ==
On election day, November 6, 1900, Democratic nominee Sam Baker Cook won the election by a margin of 38,875 votes against his foremost opponent Republican nominee Walter L. Porterfield, thereby retaining Democratic control over the office of secretary of state. Cook was sworn in as the 20th secretary of state of Missouri on January 14, 1901.

=== Results ===
Missouri Secretary of State election, 1900
Party	Candidate	Votes	%
Democratic	Sam Baker Cook	352,747	51.58
Republican	Walter L. Porterfield	313,872	45.90
Social Democratic	William H. Strife	6,114	0.89
Prohibition	Elbridge H. Benham	5,559	0.81
People's Progressive Party	Bernard Finn	4,263	0.62
Socialist Labor	Edward Heitzig	1,322	0.20
Total votes		683,877	100.00
Democratic hold			

== See also ==
- 1900 Missouri gubernatorial election
