= Coxey's Army =

1894 protest march on Washington, DC

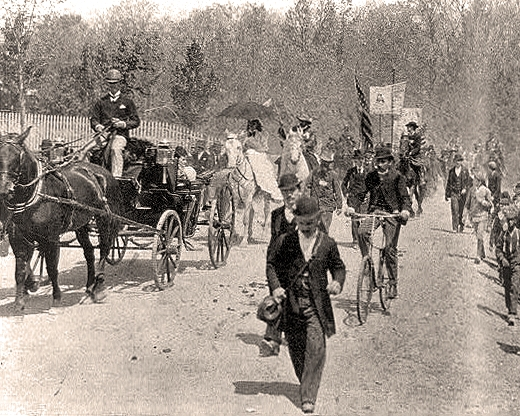
Coxey's Army marchers leaving their camp

Coxey's Army was a protest march by unemployed workers from the United States, led by Ohio businessman Jacob Coxey. They marched on Washington, D.C., in 1894, the second year of a four-year economic depression that was the worst in United States history at the time. Officially named the Army of the Commonweal in Christ, its nickname came from its leader and was more enduring. It was the first significant popular protest march on Washington, and the expression "Enough food to feed Coxey's Army" originates from this march.

== First march ==
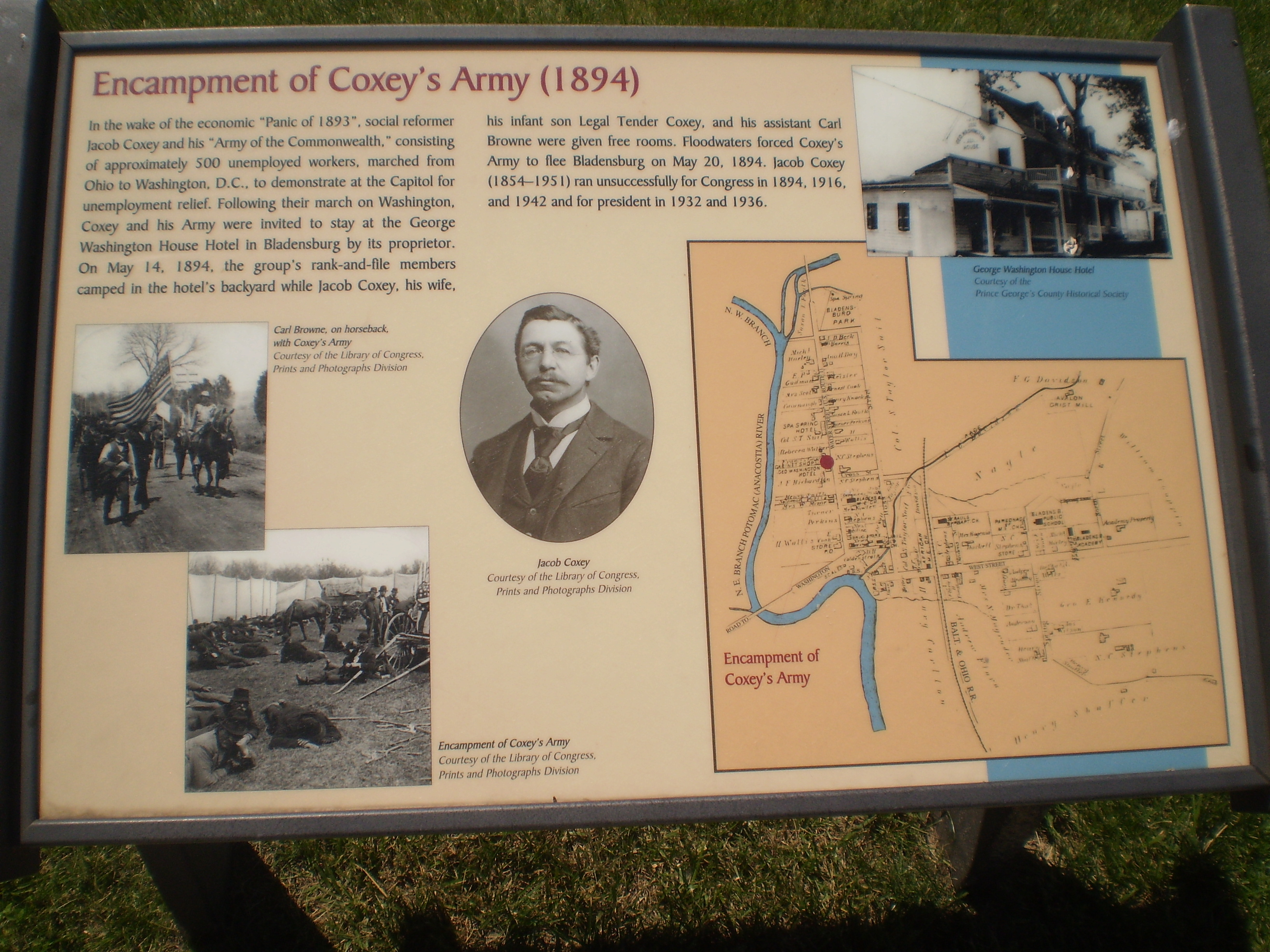
Sign marking Coxey's Army 1894 encampment in Bladensburg, Maryland

The purpose of the march, termed a "petition in boots", was to protest the unemployment caused by the Panic of 1893 and to lobby for the government to create jobs which would involve building roads and other public works improvements, with workers paid in paper currency which would expand the currency in circulation, consistent with populist ideology. The march originated with 100 men in Massillon, Ohio, on March 25, 1894, passing through Pittsburgh, Becks Run and Homestead, Pennsylvania, in April.

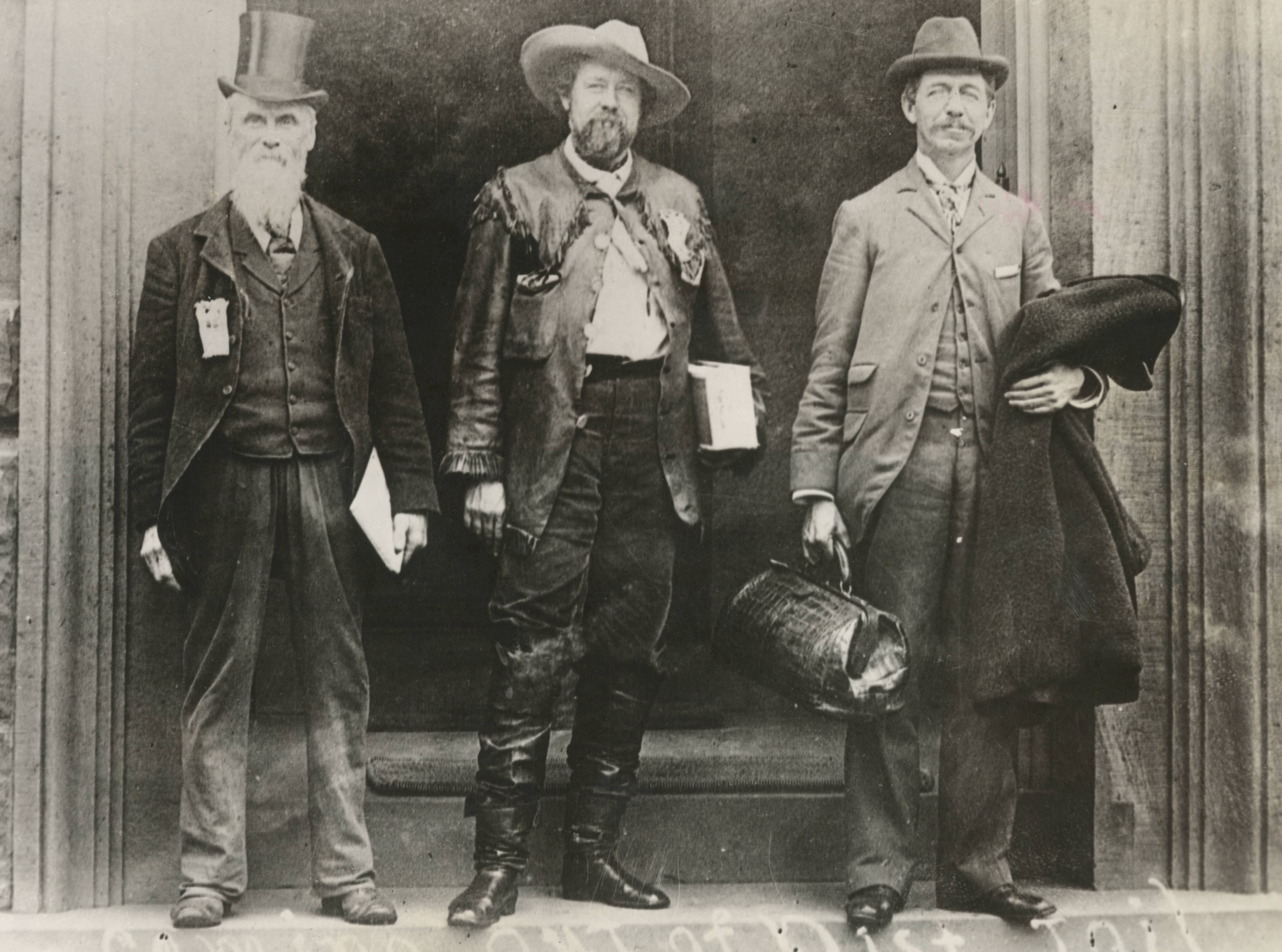
Jacob Coxey (right) is released from the D.C. Jail alongside associates Christopher Columbus Jones (left) and Carl Browne (center), 1894

The Army's western section received the nickname Kelley's Army, after California leader "General" Charles T. Kelley. Although larger at its beginning, Kelley's Army lost members on its long journey; few made it past the Ohio River. Another group, Fry's Army, began marching in Los Angeles, but largely dissipated east of St. Louis. Various groups from around the country gathered to join the march, and its number had grown to 500 with more on the way from further west when it reached Washington on April 30, 1894. The 260-acre (1.1 km^{2}) Shreve farm site at current day Colmar Manor, Maryland, was used by the 6,000 jobless men as a camp site. Coxey and other leaders of the movement were arrested the next day for walking on the grass of the United States Capitol. Interest in the march and protest rapidly dwindled. Although it was ultimately unsuccessful, the march is notable as the first protest march on Washington, D.C.

Some of the most militant Coxeyites were those who formed their own "armies" in Pacific Northwest centers such as Butte, Tacoma, Spokane, and Portland. Many of these protesters were unemployed railroad workers who blamed railroad companies, President Grover Cleveland's monetary policies, and excessive freight rates for their plight. The climax of this movement was perhaps on April 21, 1894, when William Hogan and approximately 500 followers commandeered a Union Pacific Railroad train for their trek to Washington, D.C. They enjoyed support along the way, which enabled them to fight off the federal marshals attempting to stop them. Federal troops finally apprehended the Hoganites near Forsyth, Montana. While the protesters never made it to the capital, the military intervention they provoked proved to be a rehearsal for the federal force that broke the Pullman Strike later that year.

== Second march ==
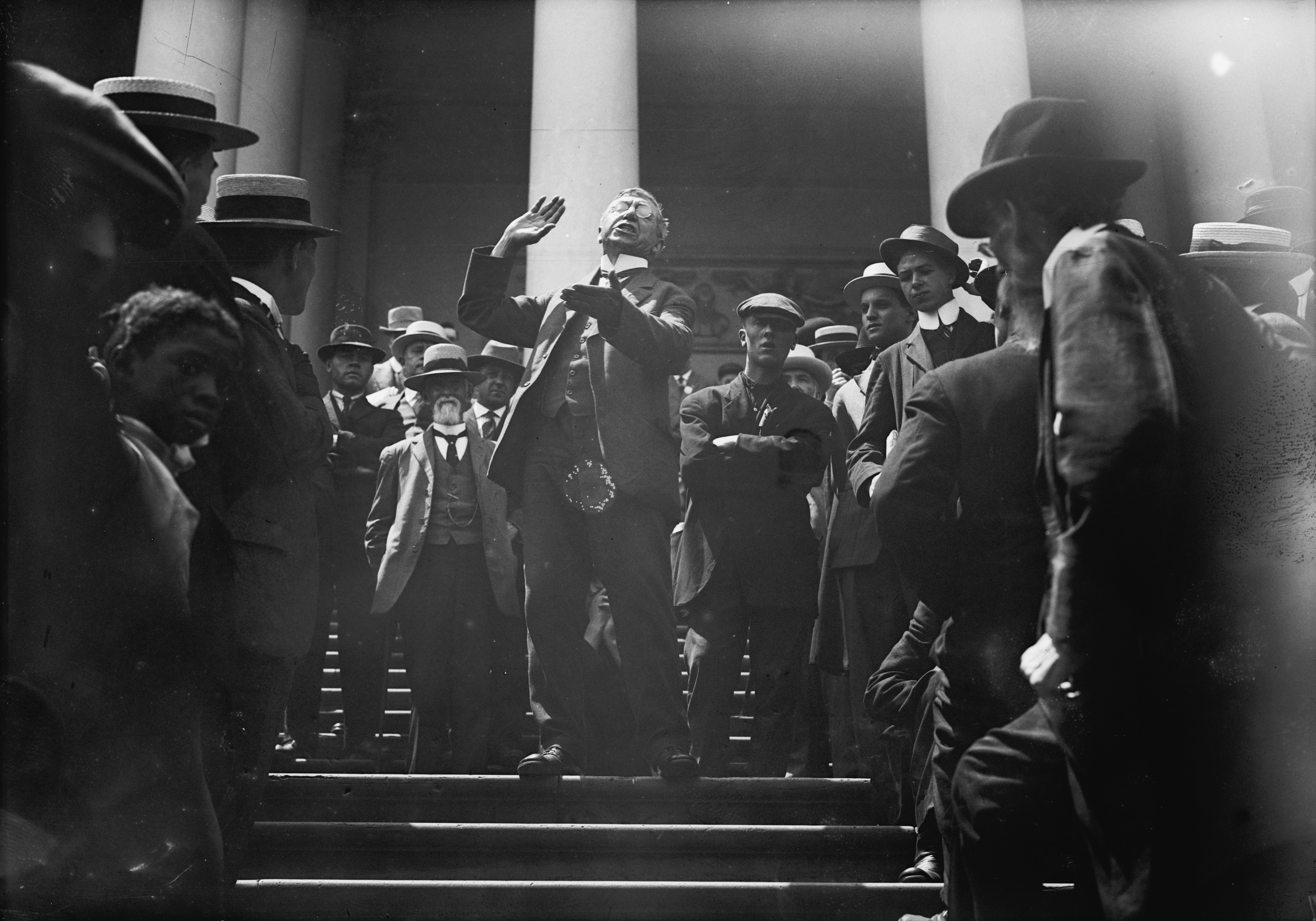
Coxey at the U.S. Capitol in 1914

Coxey organized a second march in 1914. A portion of the march reached Monessen, Pennsylvania, on April 30. Another contingent from New York City merged with the march. When the march reached Washington, D.C., Coxey addressed a crowd of supporters from the steps of the United States Capitol.

== Legacy ==
Although Coxey's proposal for government jobs was radical for its time, it came to be part of U.S. federal policy with the passing of the New Deal. On May 1, 1944, Coxey was asked to read his original petition from the steps of the Capitol. More significantly, marches on Washington became a popular way for people to express their displeasure at the government or various of its policies.

== Coxey's Army in culture ==
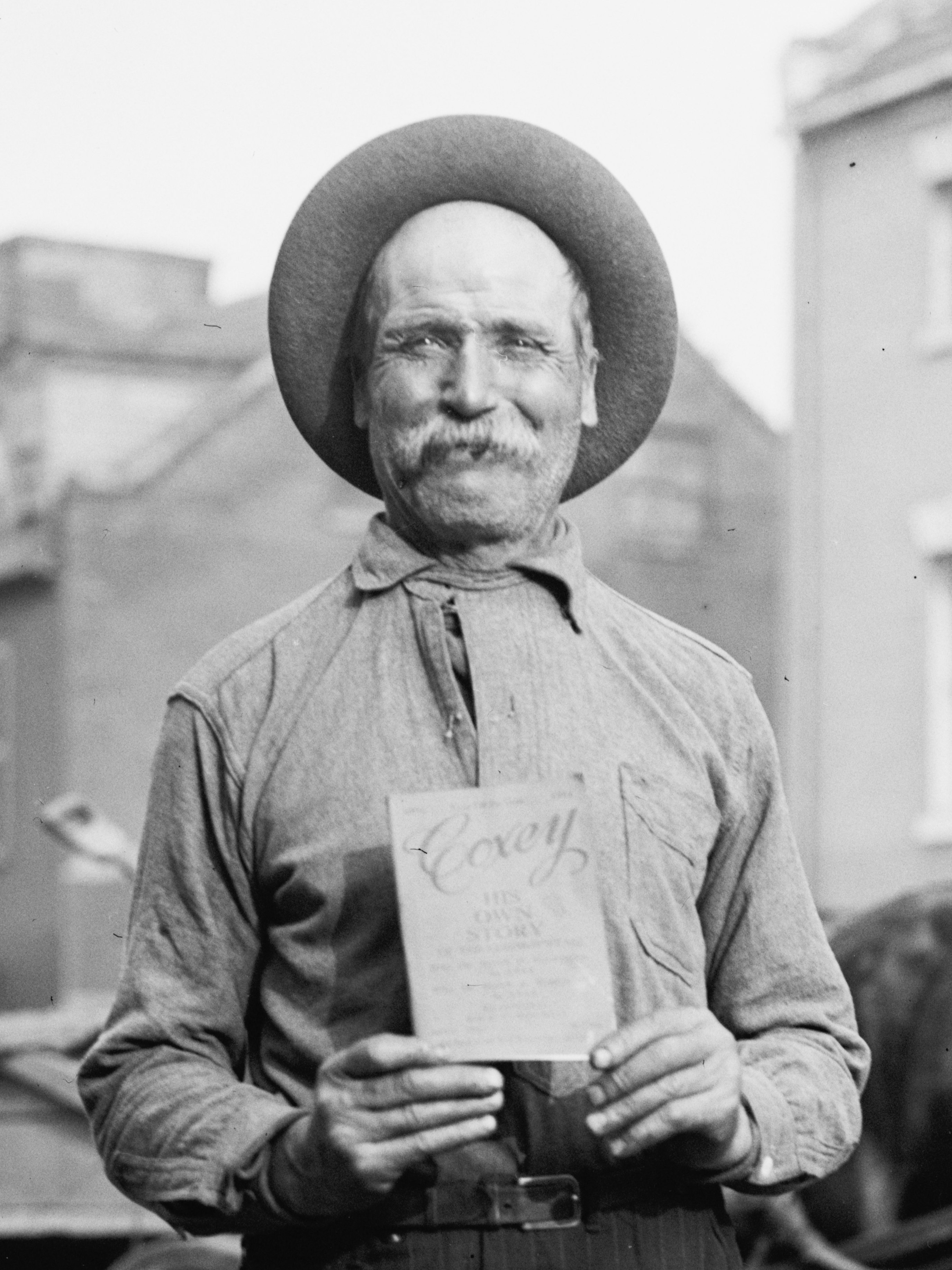
Man holding book entitled Coxey HIS OWN STORY in 1914

Among the people observing the march was L. Frank Baum, before he gained fame. There are political interpretations of his book the Wonderful Wizard of Oz which have often been related to Coxey's Army. In the novel, Dorothy, the Scarecrow (the American farmer), Tin Woodman (the industrial worker), and Cowardly Lion (William Jennings Bryan), march on the yellow brick road to the Emerald City, the Capital (or Washington, D.C.), demanding relief from the Wizard, who is interpreted to be the President. Dorothy's shoes (made of silver in the book, not the familiar ruby that is depicted in the movie) are interpreted to symbolize using free silver instead of the gold standard (the road of yellow brick) because the shortage of gold precipitated the Panic of 1893. This theory was not advanced until many decades after the book was written.

The phrase Coxey's Army has also come to refer to a ragtag band, possibly due to an incident during the second march in 1914.

In the September 1894 novel A Tale of Two Nations, written by the Coxey's future friend and ally, the famed free silver advocate William Hope "Coin" Harvey, Coxey's Army is part of the background of the novel, alongside the Pullman Strike and Panic of 1893. The brother of main character John Melwyn (William Jennings Bryan) is part of Coxey's Army.

Coxey's Army also plays a prominent role in Garet Garrett's The Driver, in which the main character is a journalist following the march.

In his story "Two Thousand Stiffs" (published in hardcover as part of the 1907 collection The Road), Jack London describes his experiences as a member of Kelley's Army. The story gives a vivid account on a personal level of the motivations of the unemployed "stiffs", the military style organization of their army, and the more and less willing support given them by more fortunate Americans who were still sympathetic to their cause. In London's description, he joined Kelley's Army at Council Bluffs, Iowa, and remained with it until its dissolution at the Mississippi River, a dissolution caused primarily by the inability to capture trains for transportation from an alerted railroad industry.

In the 1955 play Inherit the Wind, Meeker (the jailer/bailiff) mentions Coxey's Army when talking to Rachel Brown in an early scene.

The antiquated expression "Enough food to feed Coxey's Army" signifies that the person commenting believes there is a great deal more food being prepared or presented than is actually required for the persons to be fed.

In the prologue to On the Way Home, the diary of Laura Ingalls Wilder of her family's trip from De Smet, South Dakota, to Mansfield, Missouri, in 1894, there is mention of Coxey's armies. The prologue (and epilogue) to On the Way Home were written by Wilder's daughter Rose Wilder Lane, who was an accomplished and well-known writer long before her mother. Lane describes Coxey's armies as coming from California, seizing railroad trains as they headed East towards Washington, and terrorizing towns and pillaging for food on their route. Lane concluded, "In all the cities Federal troops were guarding the Government's buildings."

== See also ==
- Bonus Army, a July 1932 march on Washington, D.C.
- Fry's Army, an earlier 1894 effort to march to Washington, D.C.
- Carl Browne, a top leader of the Coxey's Army march
- James Renshaw Cox, leader of a January 1932 march on Washington, D.C.
- Stephen Maybell, leader of an 1892 effort to march to Washington, D.C.
- List of rallies and protest marches in Washington, D.C.
