= 1884 Missouri State Treasurer election =

- November 4, 1884
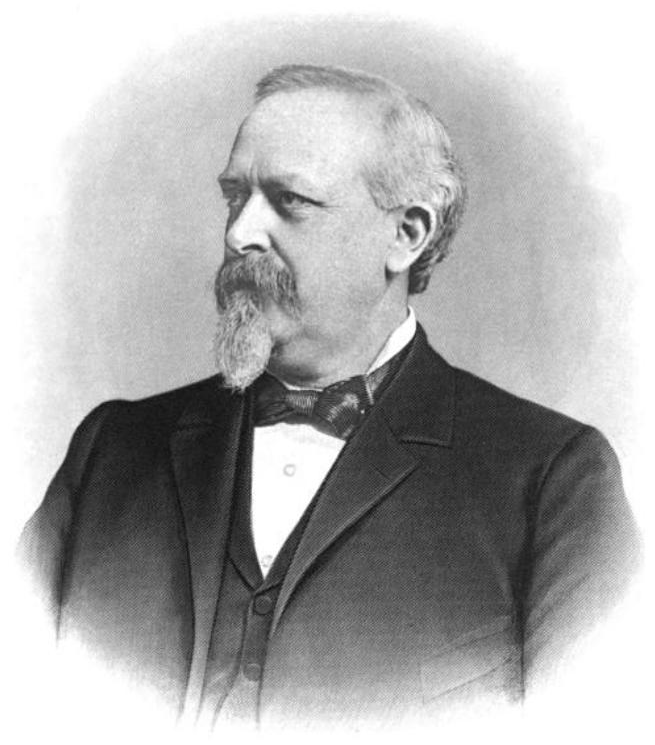
Nominee	James M. Seibert
Party	Democratic
Popular vote	Unknown
Percentage	100.00%
State Treasurer before election
Phillip Edward Chappell
Democratic
Elected State Treasurer
James M. Seibert
Democratic

The 1884 Missouri State Treasurer election was held on November 4, 1884, in order to elect the state treasurer of Missouri. Democratic nominee James M. Seibert won the election as he ran unopposed. The exact results of this election are unknown.

== General election ==
On election day, November 4, 1884, Democratic nominee James M. Seibert won the election as he ran unopposed, thereby retaining Democratic control over the office of state treasurer. Seibert was sworn in as the 16th state treasurer of Missouri on January 12, 1885.

=== Results ===
Missouri State Treasurer election, 1884
Party	Candidate	Votes	%
Democratic	James M. Seibert	Unknown	100.00
Total votes		Unknown	100.00
Democratic hold			

== See also ==
- 1884 Missouri gubernatorial election
