= 1892 Missouri State Treasurer election =

- November 8, 1892
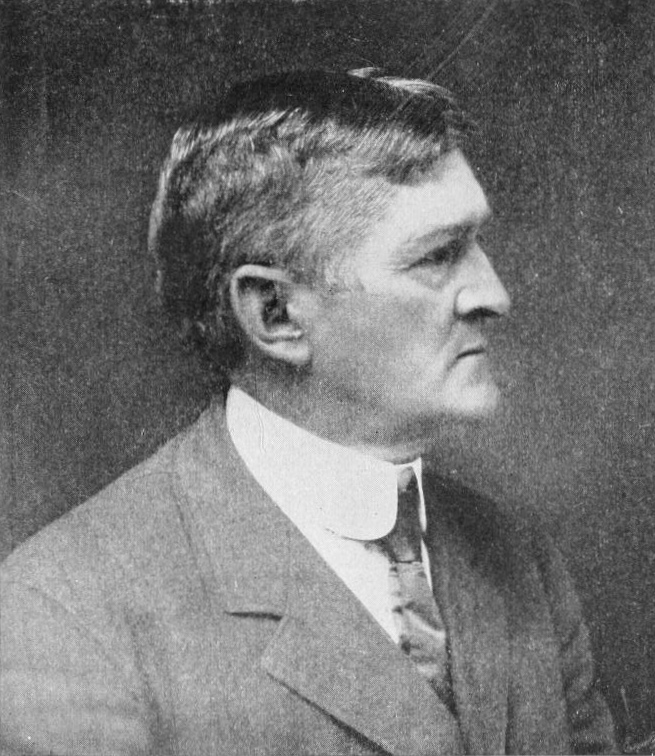

Nominee	Lawrence Vest Stephens	Frederick J. Wilson	D. N. Thompson
Party	Democratic	Republican	Populist
Popular vote	267,982	228,185	40,960
Percentage	49.52%	42.17%	7.57%
State Treasurer before election
Lawrence Vest Stephens (Acting)
Democratic
Elected State Treasurer
Lawrence Vest Stephens
Democratic

The 1892 Missouri State Treasurer election was held on November 8, 1892, in order to elect the state treasurer of Missouri. Democratic nominee and incumbent acting state treasurer Lawrence Vest Stephens defeated Republican nominee Frederick J. Wilson, People's nominee D. N. Thompson and Prohibition nominee Monroe Ingraham.

== General election ==
On election day, November 8, 1892, Democratic nominee Lawrence Vest Stephens won the election by a margin of 39,797 votes against his foremost opponent Republican nominee Frederick J. Wilson, thereby retaining Democratic control over the office of state treasurer. Stephens was sworn in for his first full term on January 9, 1893.

=== Results ===
Missouri State Treasurer election, 1892
Party	Candidate	Votes	%
Democratic	Lawrence Vest Stephens (incumbent)	267,982	49.52
Republican	Frederick J. Wilson	228,185	42.17
Populist	D. N. Thompson	40,960	7.57
Prohibition	Monroe Ingraham	3,998	0.74
Total votes		541,125	100.00
Democratic hold			

== See also ==
- 1892 Missouri gubernatorial election
