= 1888 Missouri State Auditor election =

- November 6, 1888
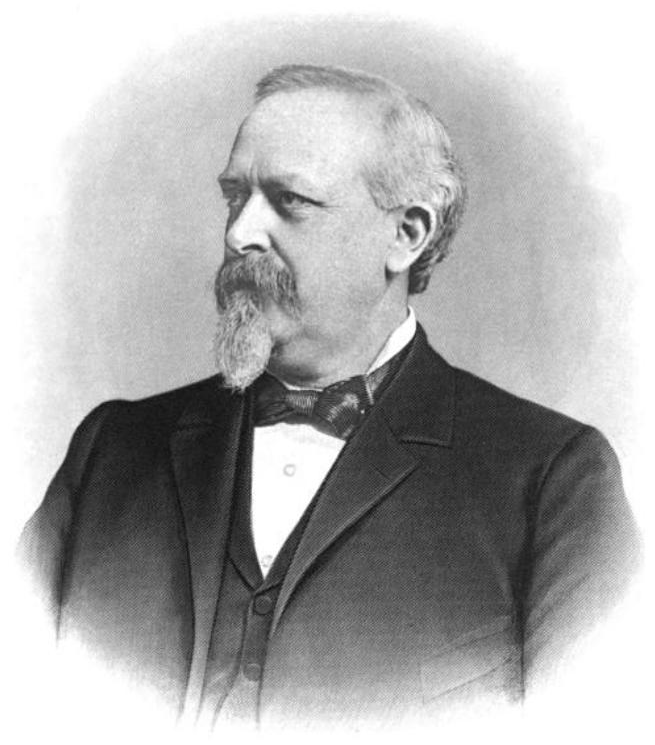

Nominee	James M. Seibert	George W. Martin
Party	Democratic	Republican
Popular vote	261,775	236,696
Percentage	50.16%	45.35%
State Auditor before election
John Walker
Democratic
Elected State Auditor
James M. Seibert
Democratic

The 1888 Missouri State Auditor election was held on November 6, 1888, in order to elect the state auditor of Missouri. Democratic nominee and incumbent State Treasurer of Missouri James M. Seibert defeated Republican nominee George W. Martin, Union Labor nominee William H. Noerr and Prohibition nominee James S. Cobban.

== General election ==
On election day, November 6, 1888, Democratic nominee James M. Seibert won the election by a margin of 25,079 votes against his foremost opponent Republican nominee George W. Martin, thereby retaining Democratic control over the office of state auditor. Seibert was sworn in as the 19th state auditor of Missouri on January 14, 1889.

=== Results ===
Missouri State Auditor election, 1888
Party	Candidate	Votes	%
Democratic	James M. Seibert	261,775	50.16
Republican	George W. Martin	236,696	45.35
Union Labor	William H. Noerr	19,069	3.65
Prohibition	James S. Cobban	4,385	0.84
Total votes		521,925	100.00
Democratic hold			

== See also ==
- 1888 Missouri gubernatorial election
