= 1892 Missouri State Auditor election =

- November 8, 1892
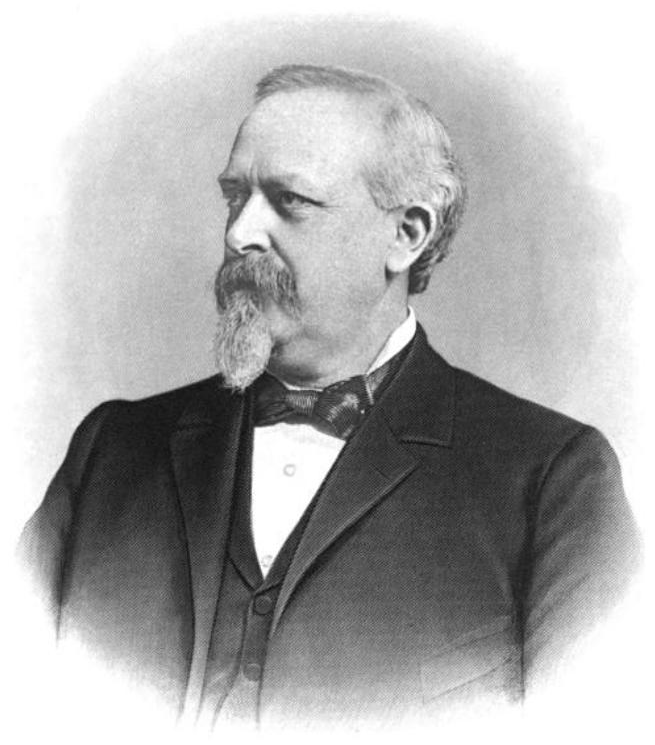

Nominee	James M. Seibert	John N. Weeks	J. B. Dines
Party	Democratic	Republican	Populist
Popular vote	268,000	228,190	40,802
Percentage	49.54%	42.18%	7.54%
State Auditor before election
James M. Seibert
Democratic
Elected State Auditor
James M. Seibert
Democratic

The 1892 Missouri State Auditor election was held on November 8, 1892, in order to elect the state auditor of Missouri. Democratic nominee and incumbent state auditor James M. Seibert defeated Republican nominee John N. Weeks, People's nominee J. B. Dines and Prohibition nominee David L. Steward.

== General election ==
On election day, November 8, 1892, Democratic nominee James M. Seibert won re-election by a margin of 39,810 votes against his foremost opponent Republican nominee John N. Weeks, thereby retaining Democratic control over the office of state auditor. Seibert was sworn in for his second term on January 9, 1893.

=== Results ===
Missouri State Auditor election, 1892
Party	Candidate	Votes	%
Democratic	James M. Seibert (incumbent)	268,000	49.54
Republican	John N. Weeks	228,190	42.18
Populist	J. B. Dines	40,802	7.54
Prohibition	David L. Steward	4,012	0.74
Total votes		541,004	100.00
Democratic hold			

== See also ==
- 1892 Missouri gubernatorial election
