= 1896 Missouri Secretary of State election =

- November 3, 1896

Nominee	Alexander A. Lesueur	William B. Freeman
Party	Democratic	Republican
Popular vote	341,512	304,015
Percentage	50.64%	45.08%
Secretary of State before election
Alexander A. Lesueur
Democratic
Elected Secretary of State
Alexander A. Lesueur
Democratic

The 1896 Missouri Secretary of State election was held on November 3, 1896, in order to elect the secretary of state of Missouri. Democratic nominee and incumbent secretary of state Alexander A. Lesueur defeated Republican nominee William B. Freeman, People's nominee Thomas H. Day, Prohibition nominee Edwin E. McClellan, National Democratic nominee and former Missouri Attorney General Daniel H. McIntyre and Socialist Labor nominee Albert E. Sanderson.

== General election ==
On election day, November 3, 1896, Democratic nominee Alexander A. Lesueur won re-election by a margin of 37,497 votes against his foremost opponent Republican nominee William B. Freeman, thereby retaining Democratic control over the office of secretary of state. Lesueur was sworn in for his third term on January 11, 1897.

=== Results ===
Missouri Secretary of State election, 1896
Party	Candidate	Votes	%
Democratic	Alexander A. Lesueur (incumbent)	341,512	50.64
Republican	William B. Freeman	304,015	45.08
Populist	Thomas H. Day	23,981	3.56
Prohibition	Edwin E. McClellan	2,308	0.34
National Democratic	Daniel H. McIntyre	1,896	0.28
Socialist Labor	Albert E. Sanderson	642	0.10
Total votes		674,354	100.00
Democratic hold			

== See also ==
- 1896 Missouri gubernatorial election
