= Ivy Terrace =

Historic house in Missouri, United States

- U.S. National Register of Historic Places
- U.S. Historic district – Contributing property
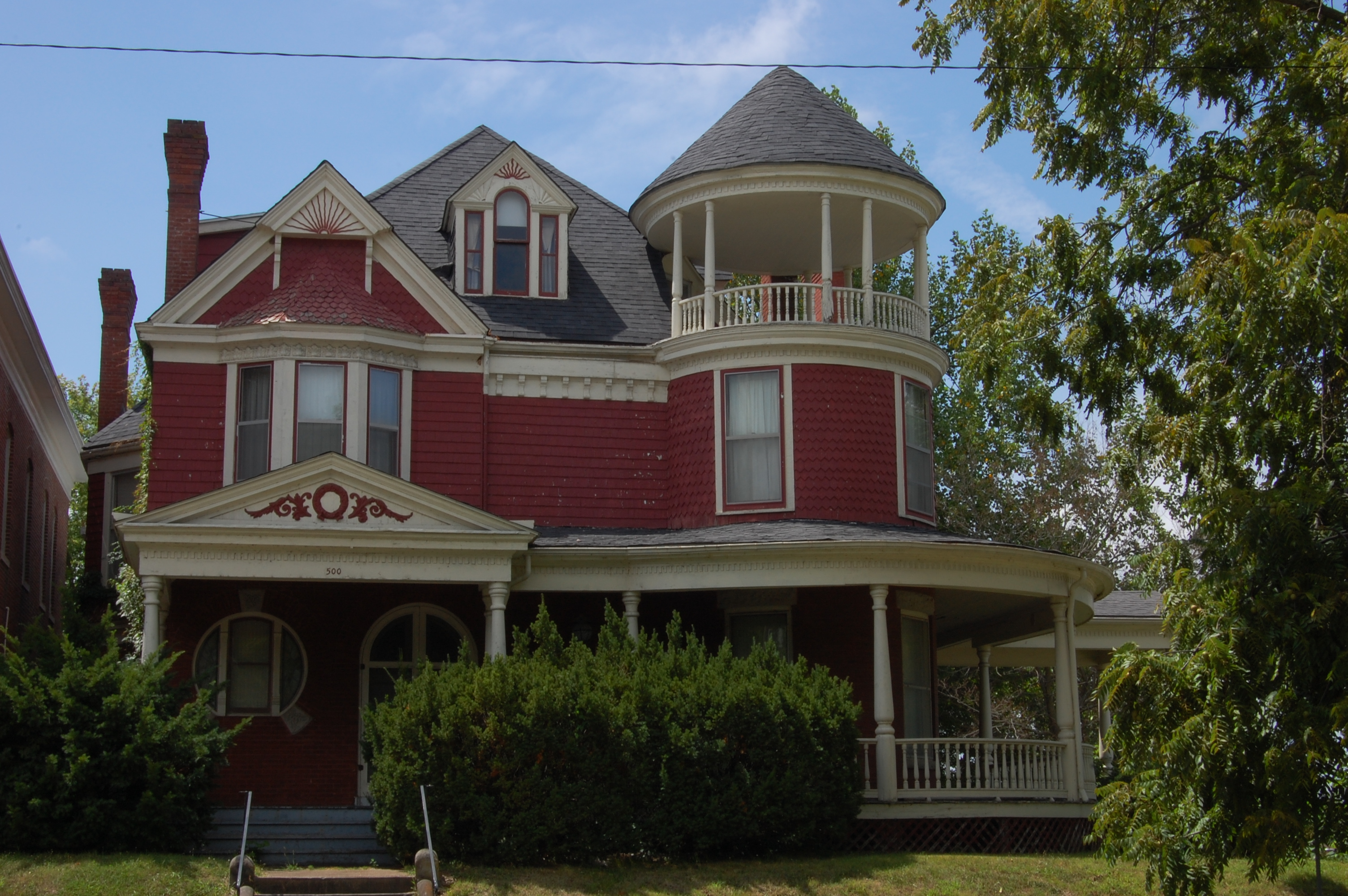
- Ivy Terrace, August 2014

- Location within Missouri Location within the United States
- Location: 500 E. Capitol Ave., Jefferson City, Missouri
- Coordinates: 38°34′26″N 92°9′57″W
- Area: less than one acre
- Built: 1893
- Architect: Opel, Charles
- Architectural style: Queen Anne
- NRHP reference No.: 90000426
- Added to NRHP: March 16, 1990

Ivy Terrace, also known as the Gov. Lawrence V. (Lon) Stephens House , is a historic home located at Jefferson City, Cole County, Missouri, United States. Built in 1893, it is a 2 1/2-story, Queen Anne style frame dwelling. It sits on a foundation of rough limestone blocks. It features a rounded tower, wraparound verandah, high and irregular roof, fish scale shingles, and asymmetrical facade. Lawrence Vest Stephens occupied the dwelling while serving as Missouri State Treasurer, for three years prior to becoming governor in 1897.

It was listed on the National Register of Historic Places in 1990. It is located in the Capitol Avenue Historic District.
