= Robert E. Lewis =

American judge (1857–1941)

Senior Judge of the United States Court of Appeals for the Tenth Circuit
- In office May 31, 1940 – July 31, 1941

Judge of the United States Court of Appeals for the Tenth Circuit
- In office March 28, 1929 – May 31, 1940
- Appointed by: operation of law
- Preceded by: Seat established by 45 Stat. 1346
- Succeeded by: Alfred P. Murrah

Judge of the United States Court of Appeals for the Eighth Circuit
- In office November 15, 1921 – March 28, 1929
- Appointed by: Warren G. Harding
- Preceded by: William Cather Hook
- Succeeded by: Seat abolished

Judge of the United States District Court for the District of Colorado
- In office April 10, 1906 – December 1, 1921
- Appointed by: Theodore Roosevelt
- Preceded by: Moses Hallett
- Succeeded by: John Foster Symes

Personal details
- Born: Robert E. Lewis; April 3, 1857 Cass County, Missouri, U.S.
- Died: July 31, 1941 (aged 84) Denver, Colorado, U.S.
- Party: Republican
- Education: Westminster College read law

Robert E. Lewis (April 3, 1857 – July 31, 1941) was a United States circuit judge of the United States Court of Appeals for the Eighth Circuit and the United States Court of Appeals for the Tenth Circuit and previously was a United States district judge of the United States District Court for the District of Colorado.

== Education and career ==
Born in Cass County, Missouri, Lewis studied at Westminster College in Fulton, Missouri. Afterward, he read law to enter the bar in 1880. Lewis was then in private practice in Clinton, Missouri from 1880 to 1897, and as worked as a prosecuting attorney of Henry County, Missouri from 1883 to 1887. He was also a Republican candidate for Governor of Missouri in 1896 and a Judge of the 4th Judicial District of Colorado from 1903 to 1906.

== Federal judicial service ==
Lewis was nominated by President Theodore Roosevelt on April 9, 1906, to a seat on the United States District Court for the District of Colorado vacated by Judge Moses Hallett. He was confirmed by the United States Senate on April 10, 1906, and received his commission the same day. His service terminated on December 1, 1921, due to his elevation to the Eighth Circuit.

Lewis was nominated by President Warren G. Harding on November 3, 1921, to a seat on the United States Court of Appeals for the Eighth Circuit vacated by Judge William Cather Hook. He was confirmed by the Senate on November 15, 1921, and received his commission the same day. Lewis was reassigned by operation of law to the United States Court of Appeals for the Tenth Circuit on March 28, 1929, to a new seat authorized by 45 Stat. 1346. He was a member of the Conference of Senior Circuit Judges (now the Judicial Conference of the United States) from 1929 to 1940. He assumed senior status on May 31, 1940. He was the last appeals court judge in active service appointed to his position by President Harding. (Note: As of 1940, six judges appointed by Harding to district courts remained in active service as appellate judges by appointments of later presidents. The last, Charles Casper Simons, remained in active service as late as 1959, whilst Morris Ames Soper and Orie Leon Phillips remained in active service until 1955.) His service ended on July 31, 1941, with his death.

== Notes ==
Party political offices
Preceded by William Warner	Republican nominee for Governor of Missouri; 1896	Succeeded by Joseph Flory
Legal offices
Preceded by Moses Hallett	Judge of the United States District Court for the District of Colorado; 1906–1921	Succeeded by John Foster Symes
Preceded by William Cather Hook	Judge of the United States Court of Appeals for the Eighth Circuit; 1921–1929	Succeeded by Seat abolished
Preceded by Seat established by 45 Stat. 1346	Judge of the United States Court of Appeals for the Tenth Circuit; 1929–1940	Succeeded by Alfred P. Murrah
