= John Dougherty (Missouri politician) =

American politician

Member of the U.S. House of Representatives from Missouri's 3rd district
- In office March 4, 1899 – March 3, 1905
- Preceded by: Alexander M. Dockery
- Succeeded by: Frank B. Klepper

Personal details
- Born: February 25, 1857 Iatan, Missouri
- Died: August 1, 1905 (aged 48) Liberty, Missouri
- Party: Democratic

John Dougherty (February 25, 1857 – August 1, 1905) was a U.S. representative from Missouri.

Born in Iatan, Missouri, Dougherty moved with his parents the same year to Liberty, Missouri. He attended the public schools and William Jewell College, Liberty, Mo,. He studied law. He was admitted to the bar in 1889 and commenced practice at Liberty, Missouri.

Dougherty was elected city attorney of Liberty, Missouri, in 1881 and served five years. He was editor and proprietor of the Liberty Tribune 1885–1888.

Dougherty was elected prosecuting attorney of Clay County, Missouri, in 1888 and served six years. He was an unsuccessful candidate for nomination in 1896 to the Fifty-fifth Congress.

Dougherty was elected as a Democrat to the Fifty-sixth, Fifty-seventh, and Fifty-eighth Congresses (March 4, 1899 – March 3, 1905). He was an unsuccessful candidate for renomination in 1904. He resumed the practice of law. He died in Liberty, Missouri, August 1, 1905. He was interred in Fairview Cemetery.

U.S. House of Representatives
Preceded by Alexander M. Dockery	Member of the U.S. House of Representatives from Missouri's 3rd congressional district 1899-1905	Succeeded by Frank B. Klepper
