= John Foster Symes =

American judge

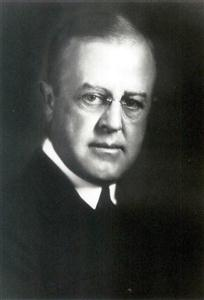

Senior Judge of the United States District Court for the District of Colorado
- In office April 14, 1950 – April 5, 1951

Judge of the United States District Court for the District of Colorado
- In office May 16, 1922 – April 14, 1950
- Appointed by: Warren G. Harding
- Preceded by: Robert E. Lewis
- Succeeded by: William Lee Knous

Personal details
- Born: John Foster Symes; February 10, 1878 Denver, Colorado, U.S.
- Died: April 5, 1951 (aged 73)
- Parent: George G. Symes (father)
- Education: Yale University (Ph.B.); Columbia Law School (LL.B.)

John Foster Symes (February 10, 1878 – April 5, 1951) was a United States district judge of the United States District Court for the District of Colorado.

== Education and career ==
Born in Denver, Colorado, Symes received a Bachelor of Philosophy degree from Yale University in 1900 and a Bachelor of Laws from Columbia Law School in 1903. He was in private practice in New York City, New York from 1902 to 1906, and in Denver from 1906 to 1921. His practice was interrupted by service in the United States Army during World War I from 1917 to 1919, where he achieved the rank of Major. He was the United States Attorney for the District of Colorado from 1921 to 1922.

== Federal judicial service ==
On April 22, 1922, Symes was nominated by President Warren G. Harding to a seat on the United States District Court for the District of Colorado vacated by Judge Robert E. Lewis. Symes was confirmed by the United States Senate on May 16, 1922, and received his commission the same day. He assumed senior status on April 14, 1950, serving in that capacity until his death on April 5, 1951. Symes was briefly a candidate for the Republican nomination for the U.S. Senate in 1932, announcing his candidacy prior to the Republican convention in August, and dropping out during the convention at the request of party leaders.

=== Marihuana Tax Act case ===
Symes also has the distinction of sentencing the first person arrested under the newly enacted 1937 Marihuana Tax Act, Moses Baca. Judge Symes, said: "I consider marijuana the worst of all narcotics-far worse than the use of morphine or cocaine. Under its influence men become beasts, just as was the case with Baca. Marijuana destroys life itself...The government is going to enforce this new law to the letter." Baca was sentenced to 18-months in Leavenworth Penitentiary for "possession" of "approximately one-fourth (1/4) of an ounce of marihuana"

== Sources ==
Legal offices
Preceded by Robert E. Lewis	Judge of the United States District Court for the District of Colorado; 1922–1950	Succeeded by William Lee Knous
