= Moses Hallett =

American judge (1834–1913)

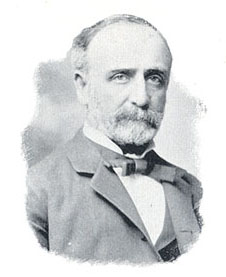

Judge of the United States District Court for the District of Colorado
- In office January 12, 1877 – April 7, 1906
- Appointed by: Ulysses S. Grant
- Preceded by: Seat established by 19 Stat. 61
- Succeeded by: Robert E. Lewis

Chief Justice of the Colorado Territorial Supreme Court
- In office 1866–1877
- Appointed by: Andrew Johnson

Personal details
- Born: Moses Hallett; July 16, 1834 Galena, Illinois, US
- Died: April 25, 1913 (aged 78) Denver, Colorado, US
- Resting place: Fairmount Cemetery (Denver, Colorado)
- Education: read law

Moses Hallett (July 16, 1834 – April 25, 1913) was a United States district judge of the United States District Court for the District of Colorado.

== Education and career ==
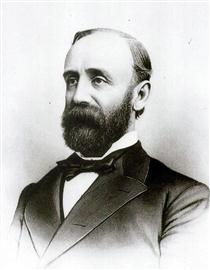
Earlier photo of Moses Hallett

Born in Galena, Illinois, Hallett attended the Rock River Seminary in Mount Morris, Illinois. Hallett read law to enter the bar in 1858. He was in private practice in Chicago, Illinois from 1859 to 1860. He was a gold miner in what was then the western end of the Kansas Territory in 1860, returning to private practice in Denver, Kansas Territory (unorganized territory from January 29, 1861, Colorado Territory from February 28, 1861) from 1861 to 1865. He was a member of the Colorado Territorial Council from 1863 to 1866. He was in private practice in Denver, Colorado Territory in 1866. He was the Chief Justice of the Colorado Territorial Supreme Court from 1866 to 1877.

== Federal judicial service ==
Following the admission of the State of Colorado to the union on August 1, 1876, Hallett was nominated by President Ulysses S. Grant on January 9, 1877, to the United States District Court for the District of Colorado, to a new seat authorized by 19 Stat. 61. He was confirmed by the United States Senate on January 12, 1877, and received his commission the same day. His service terminated on April 7, 1906, due to his retirement.

== Later career and death ==
Concurrent with his federal judicial service, Hallett served as a Professor of Constitutional Law and Federal Jurisprudence at the University of Colorado at Boulder beginning in 1892, until his death. Following his retirement from the federal bench, he was a real estate speculator in Denver from 1906 to 1913. He served as executor of George W. Clayton's estate. He was Dean at the University of Colorado School of Law from 1892 to 1902, and Dean emeritus in 1913. He died on April 25, 1913, in Denver and was buried in Denver's Fairmount Cemetery.

== Sources ==
Legal offices
Preceded by Seat established by 19 Stat. 61	Judge of the United States District Court for the District of Colorado; 1877–1906	Succeeded by Robert E. Lewis
Academic offices
Preceded by Office established	Dean of the University of Colorado School of Law; 1892–1902	Succeeded by John Campbell
