= Missouri State Penitentiary Warden's House =

Historic house in Missouri, United States

- U.S. National Register of Historic Places
- U.S. Historic district – Contributing property
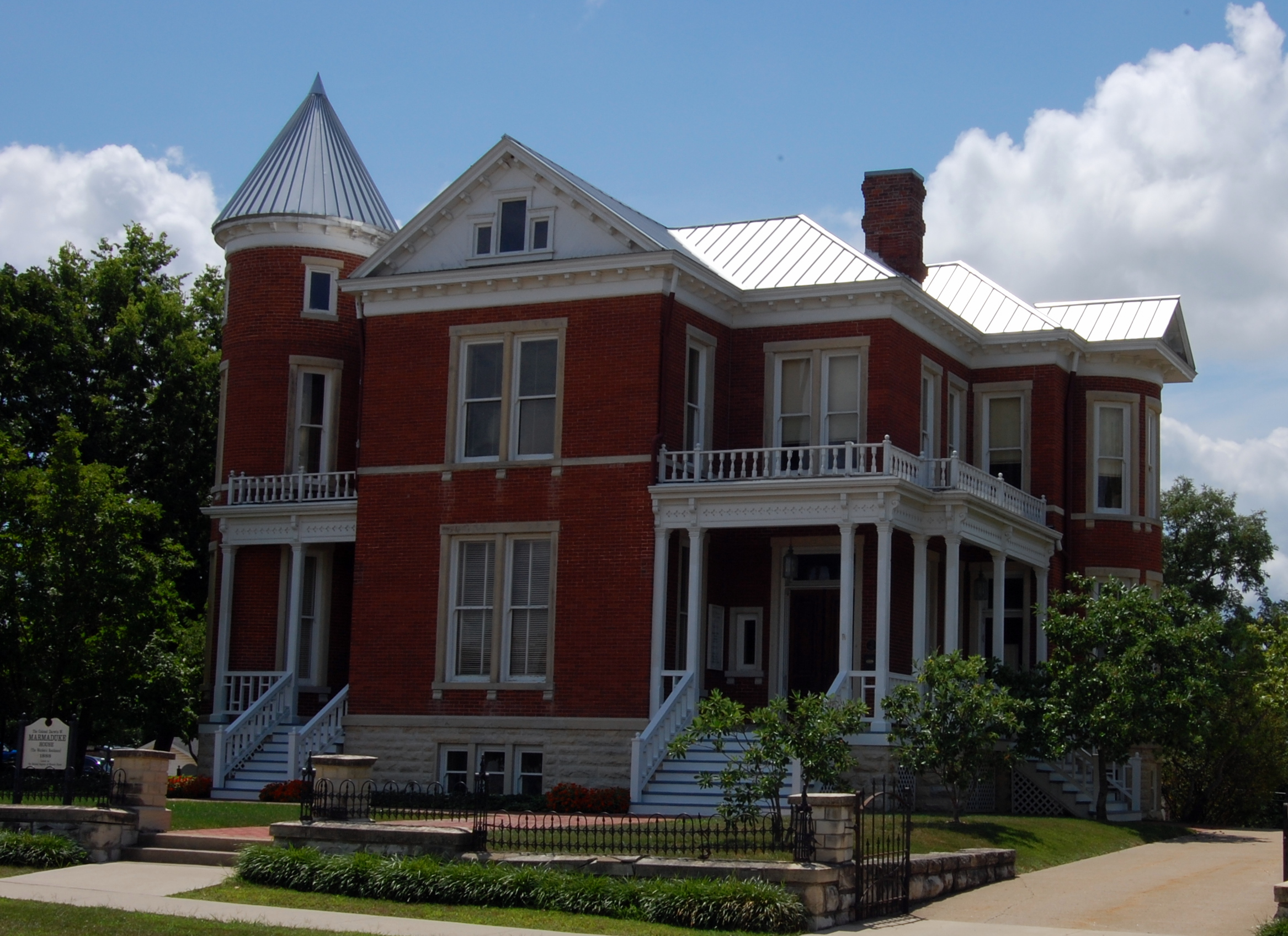
- Missouri State Penitentiary Warden's House, August 2014

- Location within Missouri Location within the United States
- Location: 700 E. Capitol Ave., Jefferson City, Missouri
- Coordinates: 38°34′20″N 92°9′47″W
- Area: less than one acre
- Built: 1888, 1907
- Architect: Bell, M. Fred
- Architectural style: Queen Anne
- NRHP reference No.: 91001518
- Added to NRHP: October 24, 1991

Missouri State Penitentiary Warden's House, also known as the Missouri State Penitentiary Director's House, is a historic home located at Jefferson City, Cole County, Missouri. It was built in 1888 and updated by architect Morris Frederick Bell in 1907 in the Queen Anne style. It is a two-story, frame dwelling and sits on a rough limestone block foundation. It features a rounded tower and two front porches.

It was listed on the National Register of Historic Places in 1990. It is located in the Capitol Avenue Historic District.
