= Fry's Army =

Political protest movement

Encampment of Fry's Army across the river from Terre Haute, Indiana, April 1894.

Fry's Army was the informal name given to a short-lived radical protest movement organized in Los Angeles, California in 1894 and headed by trade union and socialist political activist Lewis C. Fry. Fry's Army was one of about 40 "Industrial Armies" formed in 1894 to organize and transport unemployed workers for a march on Washington, D.C., the best remembered of which was the Ohio-based movement known as Coxey's Army.

Beginning with an enrollment of 850 people, the "army" made a difficult cross-country journey by foot following the refusal of railroads to transport the protestors. Two trains were stolen in the course of the march, which brought Fry's Army into conflict with the authorities. Key support was gained from the governor of Texas, which prevented mass arrest or a worse outcome, but rail transport ended in St. Louis and the remaining members of the group began a difficult march by foot. In these adverse conditions the movement melted away, splitting into rival factions in Indiana. Only a small handful of protestors eventually arriving in Washington, DC with Fry, where their protest efforts were ineffectual.

== History ==
=== Background ===
General Lewis C. Fry, organizer of the Los Angeles-based "Fry's Army" march to Washington in 1894.

The American economy went through a protracted depression during the decade of the 1890s, signaled by a dramatic drop of the stock market and a financial panic beginning in May 1893. By the end of 1893 more than 16,000 businesses and 500 banks had closed their doors, with approximately 2 million workers cast into the ranks of the unemployed. By the height of the depression in 1894 nearly 20 percent of the non-agricultural workforce would be idled by the crisis, remembered to history as the Panic of 1893.

Lewis C. Fry, a former soldier, was a general organizer for the fledgling American Federation of Labor and a member of the Socialist Labor Party of America. Fry was captivated by the idea of the Industrial Army movement of 1894, the notion of gathering and transporting unemployed workers stricken by the economic crisis for a mass march on the halls of Congress to force ameliorative and substantive change to end the economic crisis.

In February 1894, with an inadequate 6-week city-level program for unemployment relief coming to an end, "General" Fry began to organize his so-called Industrial Army. An experienced political activist well accustomed to public speaking, Fry carefully screening all those who wished to join the so-called Commonweal movement.

On March 5, Fry's newly organized "army" approved a simple three-point program for enactment, calling for federal employment of the unemployed, a ban on immigration to the United States for ten years, and a prohibition of ownership of land by non-citizens. By the middle of that same month, more than 800 people had been enrolled in the new movement and preparations began to be made to take the "army" east to put political pressure on Congress for implementation of the group's objectives. A call was made to supporters for the donation of food and blankets to supply the unemployed activists who would be making the trip.

=== Departure ===
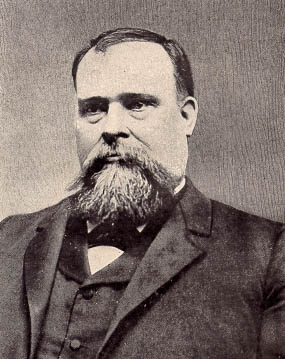
Texas Governor "Big Jim" Hogg deescalated the situation when Fry's Army was sidetracked in the Texas desert, making possible their departure from the state by rail.

Fry initially attempted to garner the support of the Southern Pacific Railroad for his effort in the form of provision of free railroad passage. The railroad unsurprisingly refused this request and on March 16, 1894, Fry and a reduced force of 600 disciplined supporters set out on foot to make the several thousand mile trek from Los Angeles on the west coast to Washington, DC on the east. The group seized a Southern Pacific train at Ontario, California and proceeded with it some 20 miles eastward to Colton, California, where several thousand pounds of hardtack, bacon, and beans were gathered by sympathizers.

Thus provisioned, the stolen train proceeded eastwards across the desert lands of the Southwestern United States, making it as far as El Paso, Texas. In El Paso the group raised additional provisions from sympathetic citizens following a peaceful march through town before stealing another train, which railroad officials permitted to depart the town with about 800 people aboard. Once outside the city, the stolen train was intentionally sidetracked at the tiny town of Sierra Blanca, Texas, where the Texas Rangers moved in at the railroad's behest to hold the train-stealing "Industrial Army" as de facto prisoners.

Texas Governor "Big Jim" Hogg was sympathetic to the cause of Fry's Army, however, and he ordered the Rangers to end their action against what he termed the "petition in boots." In a show of public support, Gov. Hogg sent a telegram to the Dallas Times Herald declaring

"When a railroad company hauls tramps or unemployed penniless men into this State it cannot dump them into a barren desert and murder them by torture and starvation without atoning for it, if there is any virtue in the machinery of justice. Nor will I permit them to be shot down on Texas soil by any armed force whatever, no matter how much the Southern Pacific and the other enemies of the state may howl about the commune."

A standoff emerged between the railroad, which continued to hold Fry's Army as virtual prisoners in an essentially unpopulated desert whistle stop, and the so-called Industrial Army and their supporters. The stalemate was broken only when trade unions and concerned citizens of El Paso raised funds to pay for provisions and a special train with five passenger coaches and two baggage cars to transport the unemployed workers as far as San Antonio.

Fry was aware that he was targeted for arrest as the ringleader of the train-stealing escapade and he attempted to elude arrest by boarding a passing freight train. He was soon discovered, however, and removed from the train, making his own way to the state capital of Austin, where the rest of Fry's Army was now located. An effort was made to march to the governor's mansion to thank him for his support but this was prevented by local police, who packed the would-be protestors tightly into boxcars and sent the group north to St. Louis.

=== Dissolution ===
On April 3, 1894, the 600 remaining members of Fry's Army arrived in St. Louis, where they were refused additional rail transportation. The decision was made to once again begin the long trek to Washington by foot. Although the size of the group swelled to about 800 during the early part of this overland trek, hunger and exhaustion set in and the so-called army melted away.

By the time the group reached Indiana it was bitterly divided over tactics and split into two rival groups. Only a small number of participants ever reached Washington, DC with Fry for the May 1 march on Congress, which ultimately proved ineffectual.

=== Legacy ===
After changing the spelling of his first name to Louis, Lewis C. Frye would twice run for Governor of Missouri, appearing on the ballot as the nominee of the Socialist Labor Party of America in the elections of 1896 and 1900.

== See also ==
- Bonus Army
- Coxey's Army
