= Jefferson Female Seminary =

- U.S. National Register of Historic Places
- U.S. Historic district – Contributing property
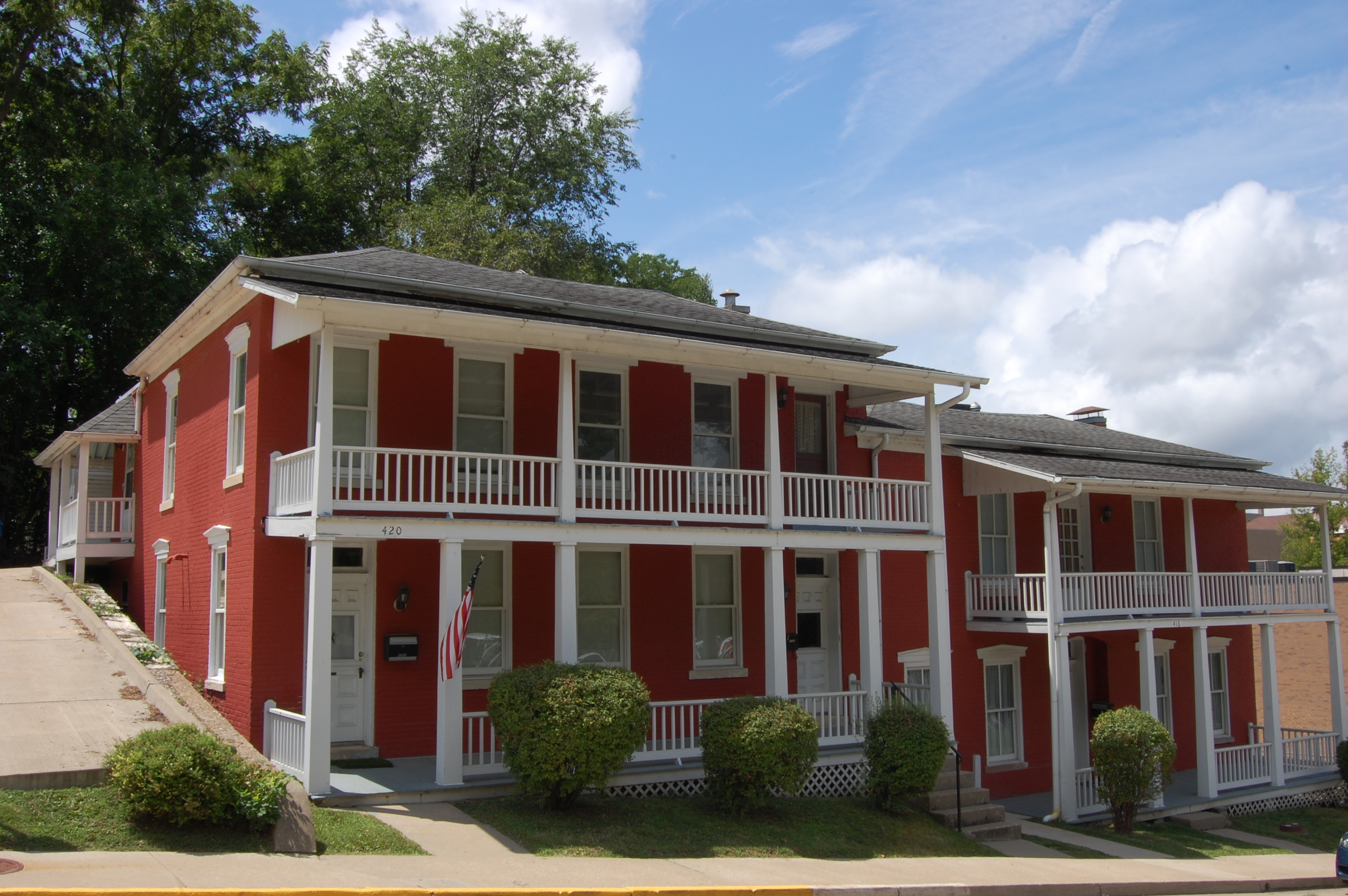
- Jefferson Female Seminary, August 2014

- Location within Missouri Location within the United States
- Location: 416 and 420 E. State St., Jefferson City, Missouri
- Coordinates: 38°34′32″N 92°9′56″W
- Area: 0.5 acres (0.20 ha)
- Built: c. 1884-1898
- NRHP reference No.: 00000087
- Added to NRHP: February 24, 2000

Jefferson Female Seminary, also known as Jefferson Female College, are two historic school buildings located at Jefferson City, Cole County, Missouri, USA. They were built between 1884 and 1898 and are adjacent two-story, five bay brick buildings. They have both front and rear porches and hipped roofs. The school closed in 1898 and the buildings have been used for residential purposes since 1900.

It was listed on the National Register of Historic Places in 2000. It is located in the Capitol Avenue Historic District.
