= Capitol Avenue Historic District =

Historic district in Missouri, United States

- U.S. National Register of Historic Places
- U.S. Historic district
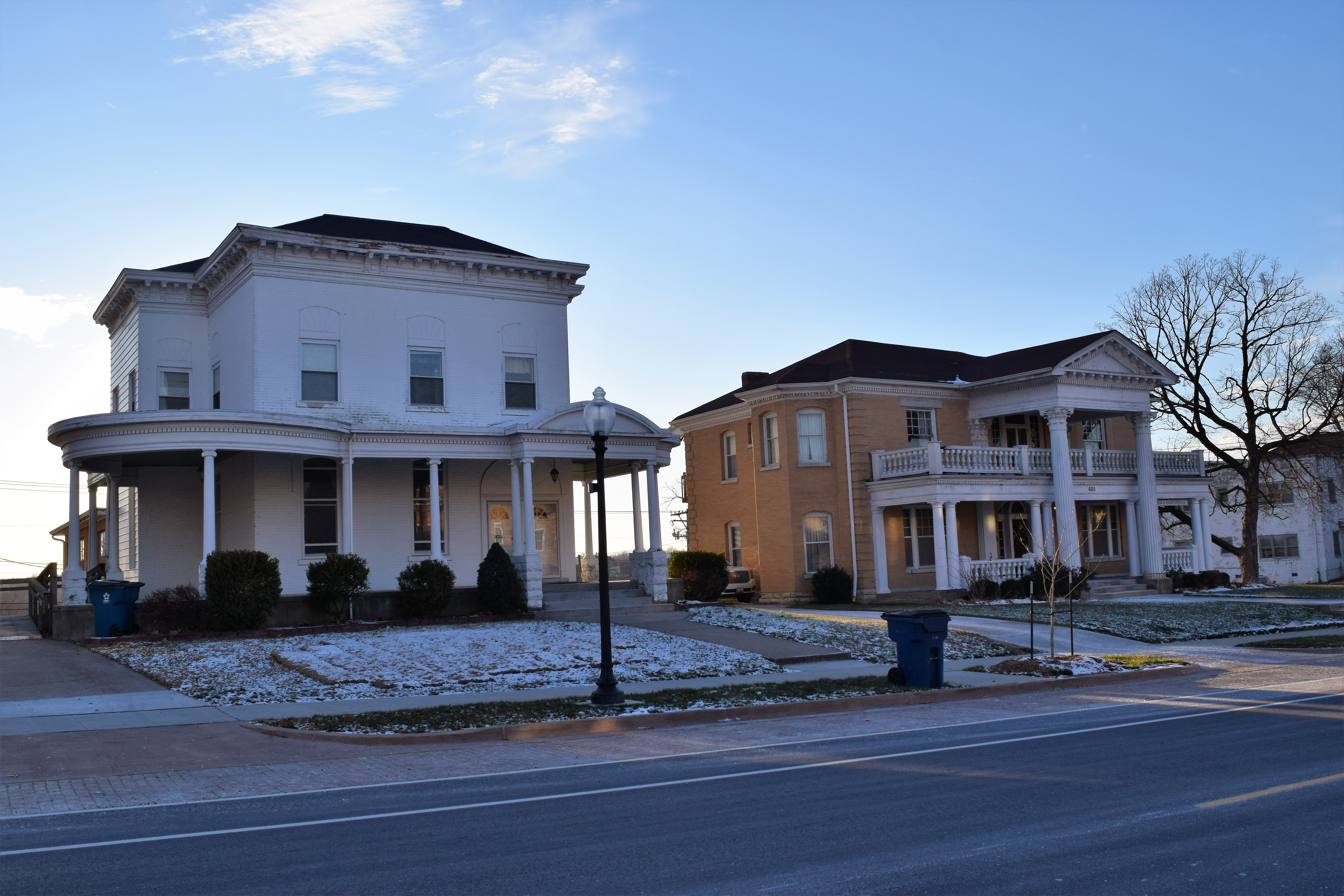
- 606 (left) and 600 (right) East Capitol Avenue

- Location within Missouri Location within the United States
- Interactive map showing the location of Capitol Avenue Historic District
- Location: Roughly Capitol Ave., from Adams to Cherry Sts., Jefferson City, Missouri
- Coordinates: 38°34′23″N 92°09′51″W
- Area: 21 acres (8.5 ha)
- Architect: Opel, Charles; et.al.
- Architectural style: Mid 19th Century Revival, Bungalow/craftsman
- NRHP reference No.: 05001473
- Added to NRHP: December 28, 2005

Capitol Avenue Historic District is a national historic district located at Jefferson City, Cole County, Missouri. It encompasses 107 contributing buildings in a predominantly residential section of Jefferson City. The district developed between about 1870 and 1947, and includes representative examples of Classical Revival, Late Victorian, Bungalow / American Craftsman, and Art Deco style architecture. Located in the district are the separately listed Lester S. and Missouri "Zue" Gordon Parker House, Jefferson Female Seminary, Missouri State Penitentiary Warden's House, and Ivy Terrace. Other notable buildings include the Parsons House (1830), former Missouri Baptist Building (1947), Grace Episcopal Church (1898), Elizabeth Alien Ewing House (1873), James A. Houchin House (1900, 1910), J. Henry Asel, Sr. and Hilda Asel House (1898), Dix Apartments (1915), W.C. Young House (c. 1873), Bella Vista Apartments (1928), and Prince Edward Apartments (1930).

It was listed on the National Register of Historic Places in 2002.
