= Lester S. and Missouri "Zue" Gordon Parker House =

Historic house in Missouri, United States

- U.S. National Register of Historic Places
- U.S. Historic district – Contributing property
- Location within Missouri Location within the United States
- Location: 624 E. Capitol Ave., Jefferson City, Missouri
- Coordinates: 38°34′21″N 92°9′49″W
- Area: less than one acre
- Built: 1905
- Architectural style: Classical Revival
- NRHP reference No.: 00000690
- Added to NRHP: June 15, 2000

Lester S. and Missouri "Zue" Gordon Parker House is a historic home located at Jefferson City, Cole County, Missouri. It was built in 1905, and is a two-story, irregular plan, a Classical Revival style brick dwelling with a hipped roof. It has two two-story brick pavilions and features a full height central portico with classical pediment and Ionic order columns and pilasters. Also on the property are the contributing small two-story brick dwelling and root cellar.

It was listed on the National Register of Historic Places in 2000, and it is located in the Capitol Avenue Historic District.
