= Edwin Batdorf =

American colonel (1854–1927)

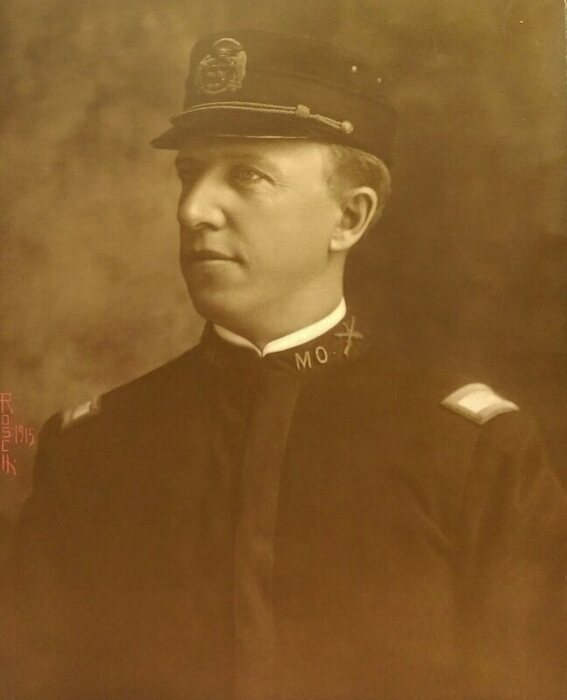
- Born: October 4, 1853; Dayton, Ohio, U.S.
- Died: January 14, 1927 (aged 73); St. Louis, Missouri, U.S.
- Burial place: Woodland Cemetery and Arboretum, Dayton, Ohio, U.S.
- Military career
- Allegiance: United States
- Branch: Missouri National Guard
- Service years: 1885–1903
- Rank: Colonel (National Guard); Brigadier General (Volunteers)
- Commands: 1st Missouri Infantry Regiment
- Conflicts: Spanish–American War

Edwin Batdorf (1853–1927) was an American colonel who commanded the 1st Missouri Infantry Regiment during the Spanish–American War. Despite the regiment never taking part in active combat, he was well known for his involvement in a political scandal involving the regiment.

== Early career ==
Batdorf was born on October 4, 1853, near Dayton, Ohio, but moved to Kansas in 1871 since his father operated at a hotel there. He later worked full-time there and began to serve the Missouri National Guard, appointed as a Captain and Adjutant on April 11, 1885. The regiment with which Batdorf served was dissolved on May 23, 1887, after the Missouri State Legislature failed to provide support, although through the efforts of then-Lieutenant Batdorf, it was succeeded by a battalion that became a new regiment within the National Guard.

== Organizational disputes ==
He was promoted to Colonel on June 21, 1893, but his career would be in controversy after he vocally criticized the state leadership over the formation of the Missouri National Guard Association and got himself into frequent altercations with them. During a meeting in January 1897 headed by Brigadier General Joseph Wickham, a proposal was made that the colonels of the state's four regiments and the two artillery captains be promoted to vice presidents. Batdorf objected to the proposal, protesting on how the significantly smaller First Artillery Battalion would gain as much representation as the larger First Missouri Regiment, which led the First Regiment to boycott the association.

== Spanish–American War ==
Before the state authorities could take further action against Batdorf, the Spanish–American War broke out and Batdorf was chosen to command the 1st Missouri Infantry Regiment on July 31, 1898. He assisted in the mustering of the regiment at the Jefferson Barracks on May 13, 1898, and left their assembly site on May 19, 1898, heading for Camp George H. Thomas at Chickamauga Park, Georgia. Despite the regiment being prepared for active service against the Spanish, Batdorf and Governor Lon Stephens began altercations again. Batdorf was then promoted to acting Brigadier General of Volunteers but the regiment remained opposed to Stephens as the officers within the regiment tended to decline any officer commissions by him with matters making it worse when Russell Alger confirmed that the volunteering regiments were to be separate from the state's national guards.

The regiment then returned to St. Louis, being one of many volunteer regiments to never leave the U.S. and with the return to Missouri came the reorganization of the regiment with Stephens personally excluding Batdorf from the new structure. This led to Batdorf filing a lawsuit against Stephens for $50,000 (Note: $1.7 million when adjusted for inflation) in damages. The lawsuit was later dismissed and Batdorf would retire by 1903.

== Later life ==
Batdorf went on to live a less controversial life as his son would become the Treasurer of the Forest City Building Company. In 1920, General Harvey Clark awarded him a medal for Missouri veterans of the Spanish-American War. He died on January 14, 1927, while at the Westgate Hotel in St. Louis. He was then buried at the Woodland Cemetery and Arboretum.
