= Edward T. Noland =

American politician (1847–1926)

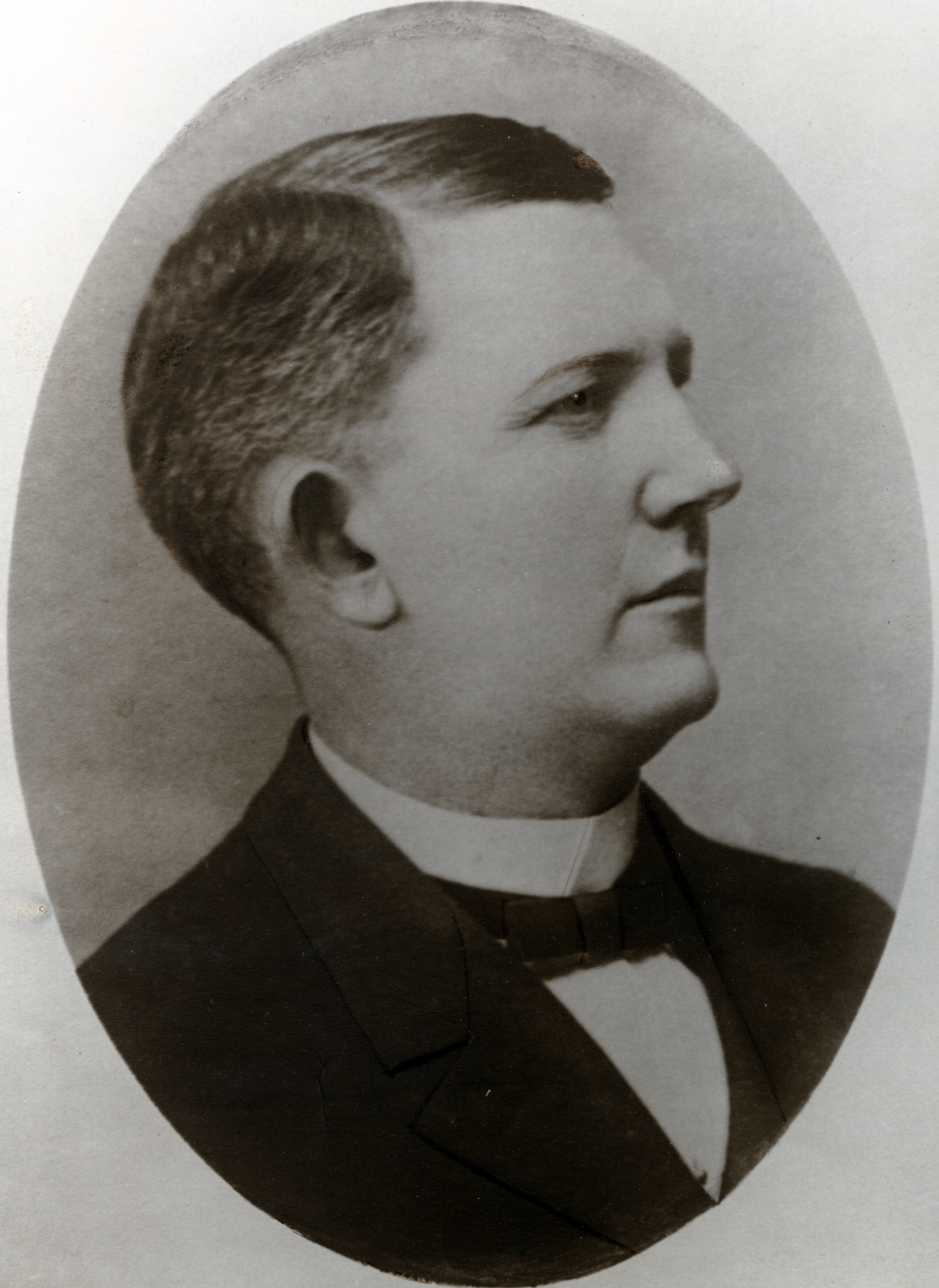

17th State Treasurer of Missouri
- In office 1889 – March 12, 1890
- Governor: Albert P. Morehouse
- Preceded by: James M. Seibert
- Succeeded by: Lawrence Vest Stephens

Personal details
- Born: March 24, 1847 Hickman Mills, Kansas City, Missouri, US
- Died: June or July 1926 (aged 79) Farmington, Missouri, US
- Party: Democratic

Edward T. Noland (March 24, 1847 – June or July 1926) was an American politician. He served as the State Treasurer of Missouri from 1889 until his resignation in 1890, due to an embezzlement scandal.

== Biography ==
Noland was born on March 24, 1847, in Hickman Mills, Kansas City, Missouri. He attended a business college. In the early 1860s, he and his brothers crossed the Great Plains via wagon. He clerked offices in Jackson County and was affiliated with the Kansas City Times. He clerked under treasurers Joseph Wayne Mercer, Elijah Gates, and James M. Seibert.

A Democrat, Noland served as State Treasurer of Missouri beginning in 1889. He was investigated in March 1890, after reports of him drinking alcohol and gambling surfaced. He was found to have embezzled $32,745.69 of funds. Governor David R. Francis knew about Noland's action prior to the investigation, but did not reveal it, as part of an agreement with Noland. After Noland's actions surfaced into the public eye, Francis suspended Noland as treasurer, claimed that he had embezzled more, then made him resign on March 12, after which he was succeeded by Lawrence Vest Stephens.

In his 1891 trial, Noland enlisted former Lieutenant Governor Charles Phillip Johnson as his lawyer, as well as Noland's cousin, also named Charles. The jury sided 6-6 and were let out, which an article in The New York Times called "suspicious". In 1892, he was found guilty of embezzlement and sentenced to two years in prison.

Following his term, Noland relocated to St. Louis. There, he worked as a businessman, travelling to England at one point for work. He later became a life insurance agent. He moved to Farmington c. 1901. His wife was Bessie E. Vaughn, who he married October 4, 1870 and had eight children with. He fell ill in 1925, dying on June or July, 1926, aged 79, in Farmington.

Party political offices
Preceded by James M. Seibert	Democratic nominee for State Treasurer of Missouri; 1888	Succeeded by Lawrence Vest Stephens
Political offices
Preceded by James M. Seibert	State Treasurer of Missouri; 1889–1890	Succeeded by Lawrence Vest Stephens
