= 1894 in rail transport =

This article lists events related to rail transport that occurred in 1894.

== Events ==
=== January events ===
- January 1 – Bangor and Aroostook Railroad begins rail service connecting Aroostook County, Maine to the United States rail network.

=== April events ===
- April 29 – The Lake Street Elevated Railroad in Chicago is extended west from California & Lake to Laramie (52nd) Avenue.

=== May events ===
- May 11 – 3,000 employees of the Pullman Palace Car Company go on strike to protest lowered wages without an equivalent reduction in expenses charged in the company town, Pullman, Illinois (a suburb of Chicago).

=== July events ===
- July 7 – The Wichita Falls Railway, a predecessor of the Missouri–Kansas–Texas Railroad, is incorporated in Texas.
- July 15 – Central Pacific Railroad scraps El Gobernador, at the time the largest locomotive in the world.

=== August events ===
- August 4 – The Denver, Leadville and Gunnison Railway in Colorado, which purchased the Denver, South Park and Pacific Railroad five years earlier, enters receivership.
- August 7 – The West Highland Railway, operated by the North British Railway, is publicly opened to Fort William, Scotland.
- August 27 – Pontiac Pacific Junction Railway opens the segment between Fort-Coulonge and Waltham, Quebec, a line segment that was completed in February 1888.

=== October events ===
- October – Mur Valley Railway opens in Austria with the first class U 0-6-2T.

=== November events ===
- November – Eben B. Thomas succeeds John King as president of the Erie Railroad.
- November 7 – The Southern Pacific Railroad inaugurates the Sunset Express passenger train between New Orleans and San Francisco.

=== December events ===
- December 22 – The Chelford rail accident in England kills 14.

=== Unknown date events ===
- The Southern Railway is formed from the combination of the Richmond and Danville Railroad system and the East Tennessee, Virginia and Georgia Railroad.
- Stearns Manufacturing Company of Erie, Pennsylvania, starts manufacturing Heisler locomotives.
- Oliver Robert Hawke Bury moves from the Chief mechanical engineer position at the Great Western Railway of Brazil to the same position at the Entre Ríos Railway in Argentina.
- Construction of first oil-engined locomotive, an experimental unit designed by William Dent Priestman and built by his company, Priestman Brothers of Hull, England.

== Deaths ==
- March 2 – William H. Osborn, president of Illinois Central Railroad 1855–1865, president of Chicago, St. Louis and New Orleans Railroad 1875–1882, dies (b. 1820).
- September 1 – Robert Pearson Brereton, chief assistant to Isambard Kingdom Brunel who completed many engineering projects after Brunel's death in 1859 (b. 1818).
