= 1900 Missouri gubernatorial election =

- November 6, 1900
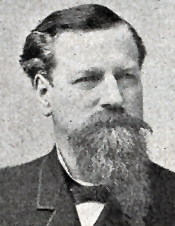

Nominee	Alexander Monroe Dockery	Joseph Flory
Party	Democratic	Republican
Popular vote	350,045	317,905
Percentage	51.15%	46.46%
- County results Dockery: 40–50% 50–60% 60–70% 70–80% 80–90% Flory: 40–50% 50–60% 60–70% 70–80%
Governor before election
Lawrence Vest Stephens
Democratic
Elected Governor
Alexander Monroe Dockery
Democratic

The 1900 Missouri gubernatorial election was held on November 6, 1900, and resulted in a victory for the Democratic nominee, former Congressman Alexander Monroe Dockery, over the Republican candidate Joseph Flory and several other candidates representing minor parties.

== Results ==
1900 gubernatorial election, Missouri
Party	Candidate	Votes	%	±%
Democratic	Alexander Monroe Dockery	350,045	51.15	−1.73
Republican	Joseph Flory	317,905	46.46	+0.11
Social Democratic	Caleb Lipscomb	5,577	0.82	+0.43
Prohibition	Charles E. Stokes	5,195	0.76	+0.37
People's Progressive	J. H. Hillis	4,356	0.64	+0.64
Socialist Labor	Louis C. Fry	1,213	0.18	+0.07
Majority		32,140	4.70	−1.83
Turnout		684,291	22.03	
Democratic hold		Swing		
