= Alexander M. Dockery =

American politician (1845–1926)

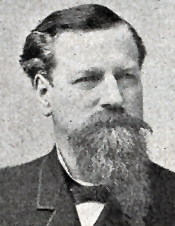

30th Governor of Missouri
- In office January 14, 1901 – January 9, 1905
- Lieutenant: John Adams Lee; Thomas Lewis Rubey
- Preceded by: Lawrence Vest Stephens
- Succeeded by: Joseph W. Folk

Member of the U.S. House of Representatives from Missouri's 3rd district
- In office March 4, 1883 – March 3, 1899
- Preceded by: Gustavus Sessinghaus
- Succeeded by: John Dougherty

Personal details
- Born: February 11, 1845 Near Gallatin, Missouri, US
- Died: December 26, 1926 (aged 81) Gallatin, Missouri, US
- Resting place: Edgewood Cemetery, Chillicothe, Missouri
- Party: Democratic
- Spouse: Mary Elizabeth Bird
- Children: Five, none reaching adulthood.
- Education: Washington University School of Medicine
- Profession: Physician, banker, politician
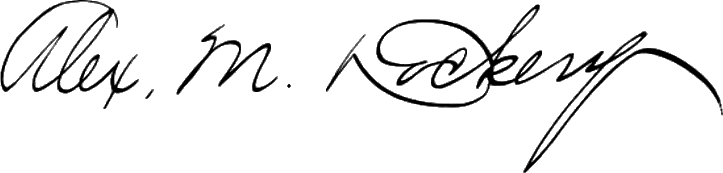
- Signature

Alexander Monroe Dockery (February 11, 1845 – December 26, 1926) was an American physician and politician who served as the 30th governor of Missouri from 1901 to 1905. A Democrat, he was a member of the United States House of Representatives, representing the 3rd district from 1883 to 1899.

According to one observer, Dockery generally disdained "the progressive-reform impulses that were in ascendancy at the dawn of the new century."

== Early life ==
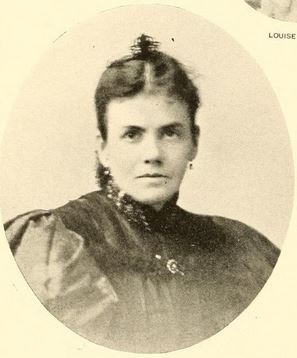
Mary Elizabeth Bird

Alexander Dockery, only child of Willis E. and Sarah Ellen Dockery, was born near Gallatin, Missouri. His father was a Methodist minister and one of the early settlers to the county. The young Dockery attended the local public schools and then studied for a brief time at Macon Academy in (Macon, Missouri) before attending the St. Louis Medical College (now Washington University School of Medicine), graduating on March 2, 1865. Dockery established a medical practice in Linneus, Missouri and attended post-graduate lectures at Bellevue College (New York City) and Jefferson Medical College (Philadelphia) during the winter of 1865–1866. He returned to his practice in Linneus for a time before moving to Chillicothe, Missouri. While in practice in Chillicothe, he met and married Mary Elizabeth Bird in 1869. Dockery served as county physician for Livingston County, Missouri, from 1870 to 1874. He also made his first tentative step into politics by serving as president of the Chillicothe board of education from 1871 to 1873. In 1872 Dockery began a ten-year period as a member of the Board of Curators of the University of Missouri.

In March 1874 Dr. Dockery ended his medical practice and returned to his native Gallatin to start a career in banking. He had originally intended to establish a bank in Milan, Missouri, but a Chillicothe friend and business associate, Thomas Yates, urged him to go into partnership with him in Gallatin instead. Dr. Dockery served as cashier and treasurer of the Farmers Exchange Bank, developing money management skills that would later prove useful in his political career both in the U.S. House of Representatives and as Missouri governor.

== Politics ==
Alexander Dockery was a member of the Gallatin City Council beginning in 1878, and served as town mayor from 1881 to 1883. Pursuing a more active role in Democratic politics, Dockery was chairman of the congressional committee of his district In 1882 this led to him running for U.S. Congress. In November of that year he defeated incumbent Representative Joseph H. Burrows (Greenback Party) and Republican James H. Thomas with 52.9 percent of the vote to win a seat he would hold for the next sixteen years.

=== U.S. House ===
Congressman Dockery developed a reputation as a staunch fiscal conservative in the House, earning the sobriquet "Watchdog of the Treasury" during his ten years on the House Appropriations Committee, once stating "Unnecessary taxation leads to surplus revenue, surplus revenue begets extravagance, and extravagance sooner or later is surely followed by corruption." Drawing on his banking experience, he played a key role in the Treasury Departments modification and updating of its accounting practices. Dockery also served as Chairman of the Committee on Expenditures in the Post Office where he brought about more fiscal responsibility and urged changes that improved mail delivery, especially in rural areas. He was an ardent supporter of Rural Free Delivery and its implementation in the 1890s. Dockery also fought against high tariffs, feeling it hurt farm exports. Among the important issues he would vote on in his time in Congress were the Interstate Commerce Act of 1887, the Hatch Act, and the Spanish–American War. After serving eight terms in Congress Dockery chose not to run for reelection in 1898. Finishing out his term in March 1899 he returned to Gallatin and began preparations for his next political goal, that of Missouri governor.

=== Governorship ===
The Missouri Gubernatorial election of November 1900 saw Alexander Dockery defeat Republican Joseph Flory and a divided field of four other candidates to win a narrow 51-percent victory. As Governor Dockery worked for increasing education funding and establishment of school districting across the state. Other highlights included election reforms and a franchise tax law was passed. Through increased revenue and changes in fiscal management techniques, a Dockery hallmark, during his administration the state's bonded indebtedness was paid off. Dockery was responsible for a "Missouri first" on March 23, 1903, when he signed the first state legislation licensing automobiles. The law required drivers to ring a bell or sound a horn or whistle before passing any horse-drawn machinery or vehicles. It also set a first-in-the-nation statewide speed limit of nine miles per hour. As governor, Alexander Dockery served as host to many world and national dignitaries during the 1904 St. Louis Worlds Fair.

Prohibited by the Missouri constitution from a second term as governor, Dockery left office in early January 1905 replaced by fellow Democrat Joseph W. Folk, a man he strongly disagreed with. Folk was a political reformer from St. Louis who crusaded against patronage and cronyism, the status quo in turn-of-the-20th-century Missouri politics. Questioning Folk's party loyalty, Dockery lobbied hard against him. Folk in return charged that the Dockery had allowed Democratic machine politics to intimidate voters in the Democratic primary voting. Folk claimed that Dockery was either too incompetent to control the St. Louis police or was complicit in their inaction as Folk supporters were intimidated or physically attacked at St. Louis polling places. Rather than see the state's highest office go to a Republican, the Folk-Dockery feud was settled in a second "Missouri Compromise" at the state Democratic convention. With Dockery's tepid support, Folk and his reformers won, marking a sea change in state politics as the "old guard" Democrats and their way of doing things began to fade.

=== Postal Service ===
Now a widower following the 1903 death of his wife, Alexander Dockery returned to Gallatin prepared for a life of semi-retirement. He was active in local civic affairs, and found enjoyment in, of all things, road repair. It was not an uncommon sight around Daviess County's Union Township to find Dockery with a horse and wagon out patching potholes and fixing culverts. In spite of his earlier clash with Joseph Folk, Dockery remained active in state Democratic politics, serving as treasurer of the Democratic State Committee in 1912 and 1914. Dockery's retirement ended in 1913 when on a trip to see the inauguration of Woodrow Wilson the new President asked him to help manage and streamline the U.S. Postal Service. Appointed the position of third assistant Postmaster General, Dockery helped put the agency's fiscal house in order. He served in the role until March 31, 1921.

== Final years ==
Alexander Dockery retired to Gallatin again for the final years of his life. His wife deceased and all of their children dying very young, Dockery directed his paternal feelings toward the children of the community as a whole. A very large donation of books and money by Dockery helped create the Gallatin High School library. He also donated a 13-acre tract of land for use as a park. For many years "Dockery Day", his birthday, was celebrated in the community with all the schoolchildren receiving free admission to the town theater that day, courtesy of the Governor. Alexander Monroe Dockery died December 26, 1926. He is buried in the Edgewood Cemetery in Chillicothe, Missouri.

Party political offices
Preceded by Lon Vest Stephens	Democratic nominee for Governor of Missouri; 1900	Succeeded by Joseph W. Folk
U.S. House of Representatives
Preceded by Gustavus Sessinghaus	Member of the U.S. House of Representatives from Missouri's 3rd congressional district 1883–1899	Succeeded by John Dougherty
Political offices
Preceded by Lon Vest Stephens	Governor of Missouri; 1901–1905	Succeeded by Joseph W. Folk
