= 1896 Missouri gubernatorial election =

- November 3, 1896
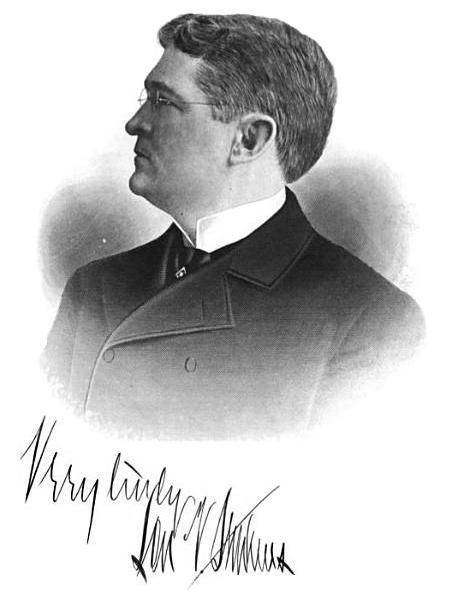

Nominee	Lawrence Vest Stephens	Robert E. Lewis
Party	Democratic	Republican
Popular vote	351,062	307,729
Percentage	52.88%	46.35%
- County results Stephens: 40–50% 50–60% 60–70% 70–80% 80–90% Lewis: 40–50% 50–60% 60–70% 70–80%
Governor before election
William J. Stone
Democratic
Elected Governor
Lawrence Vest Stephens
Democratic

The 1896 Missouri gubernatorial election was held on November 3, 1896, and resulted in a victory for the Democratic nominee, State Treasurer of Missouri Lawrence Vest Stephens, over the Republican candidate Robert E. Lewis, Prohibition candidate Herman Preston Faris, National Democratic candidate J. McDowell Trimble and Socialist Labor candidate Louis C. Fry.

== Results ==
1896 gubernatorial election, Missouri
Party	Candidate	Votes	%	±%
Democratic	Lawrence Vest Stephens	351,062	52.88	+2.90
Republican	Robert E. Lewis	307,729	46.35	+2.85
Prohibition	Herman Preston Faris	2,588	0.39	−0.24
National Democratic	J. McDowell Trimble	1,809	0.27	+0.27
Socialist Labor	Louis C. Fry	757	0.11	+0.11
Majority		43,333	6.53	+1.05
Turnout		663,945	24.78	
Democratic hold		Swing		
