= Lawrence Vest Stephens =

American politician (1858–1923)

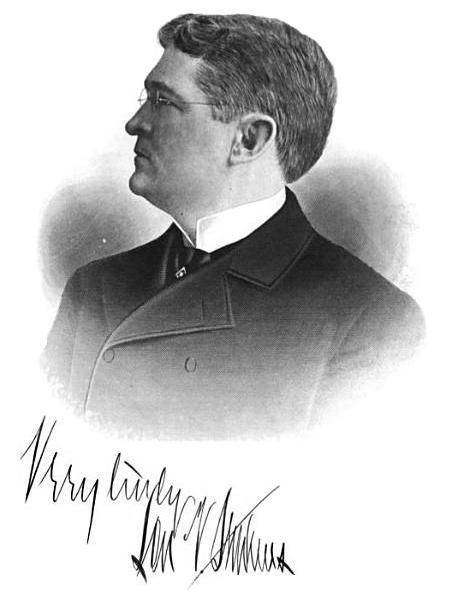

29th Governor of Missouri
- In office January 11, 1897 – January 14, 1901
- Lieutenant: August Bolte
- Preceded by: William J. Stone
- Succeeded by: Alexander Monroe Dockery

18th State Treasurer of Missouri
- In office 1890–1897
- Governor: David R. Francis; William J. Stone
- Preceded by: Edward T. Noland
- Succeeded by: Frank L. Pitts

Personal details
- Born: December 1, 1858 Boonville, Missouri, US
- Died: January 10, 1923 (aged 64) St. Louis, Missouri, US
- Party: Democratic
- Spouse: Margaret Nelson
- Education: Washington and Lee University
- Profession: banker, newspaper publisher
- Nickname: Lon Stephens

Lawrence "Lon" Vest Stephens (December 1, 1858 – January 10, 1923) was an American politician, newspaper editor, and banker from Missouri. He served as State Treasurer of Missouri from 1890 to 1897, and as the 29th governor of Missouri from 1897 to 1901.

== Early life ==
Stephens was born in Boonville, Missouri. He was the son of Martha (née Gibson) and Joseph Lafayette Stephens, an attorney, banker, and railroad builder. His father was also an unsuccessful candidate for governor.

He attended Boonville public schools, followed by three years at Cooper Institute. Next, he attended the Kemper Family School for three years. While he was a student, his father taught him about banking and employed him as a bank messenger and teller. He also took a course in telegraphy, leading to a job with Western Union in Boonville.

He enrolled in Washington and Lee University, becoming interested in finance and economics. While there, he was a member of the Fraternity of Delta Psi (St. Anthony Hall). He graduated with a law degree in 1877.

After college, he traveled in Europe.

== Career ==
After college in 1878, Stephens became a bookkeeper at the Central National Bank of Boonville, managed by his father. There, he rose to cashier, vice-president, and director. In 1879, he became the owner and editor of the Boonsville Advertiser.

In 1887, he became the receiver of the Fifth National Bank of St. Louis after it failed. He was also the financial agent of Cooper County and Morgan County. He increased his ownership of the Central National Bank, opened a bank in Bunceton, and was key in creating the Central Missouri Trust Company in Jefferson City. He also owned stockholder in the bank of Versailles and in various banks in St. Louis.

He became aide-de-camp on the staffs of Governor John Marmaduke and Governor David R. Francis, eventually becoming paymaster-general. On March 12, 1890, Governor Francis appointed Stephens as State Treasurer of Missouri, to fill the unexpired term of Edward T. Noland. He was nominated for a full term by the Democratic State convention 1892, and won the general election. He remained in that office through 1897.

While State Treasurer, he advocated for bimetallism, contributing money and time to promote the silver standard. Over the course of two years, he wrote a weekly column, "Silver Nuggets," for his Boonville Advertiser—however, he stepped down as editor of the newspaper when he became State Treasurer. These article were republished in a pamphlet and in Democratic newspapers by the Missouri Democratic central committee.

After serving as governor, Stephens returned to his banking interests in Boonville, Jefferson City, and St. Louis. He retained the newspaper until several years before his death.

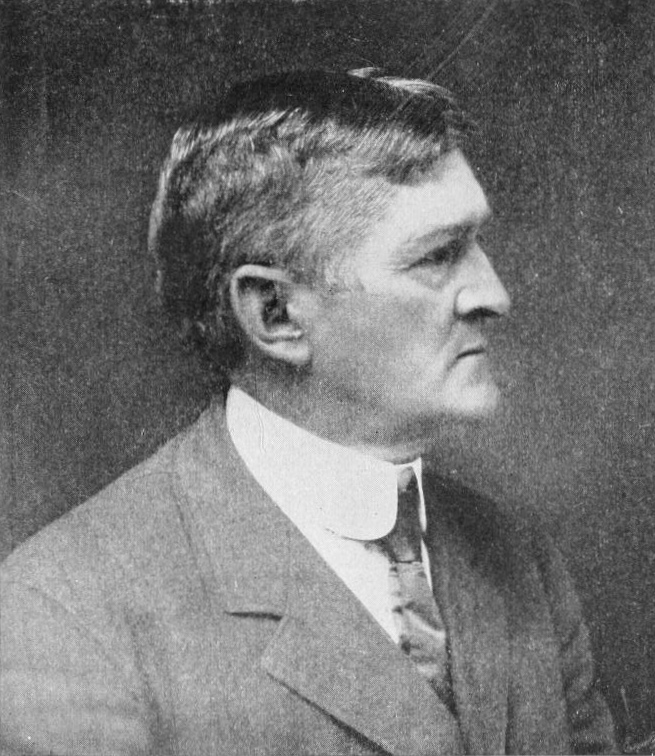
Lawrence Stephens

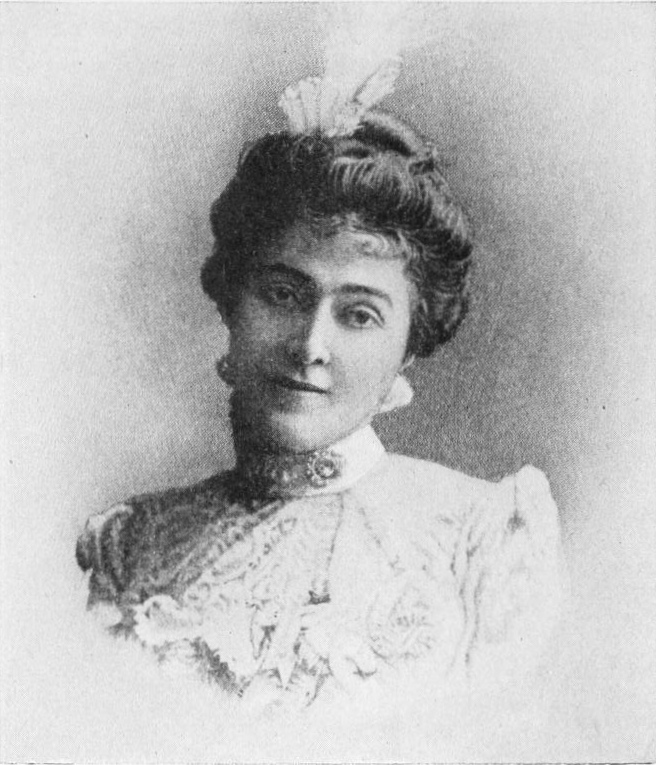
Margaret Nelson Stephens

== Governor ==
In 1896, Stephens was nominated as the Democratic candidate for Governor of Missouri by acclamation, the first time that Missouri Democrats had done so. He used his knowledge of newspapers to advance his campaign, and that of William Jennings Bryan who running for president at the same time. In the 1896 general election, Stephens won by a sizeable majority.

As Governor, he supported funding for public schools and state universities. He also supported the expansion of insane asylums. He took on the state's prison system, turning it into a self-supporting institution and money-maker for the state. Other bills that he endorsed created a State Fair, a State Historical Society, and homes for Union and Confederate veterans. He also supported funding for the St. Louis World's Fair.

Stephens was in favor of progressive taxation, increasing taxes on wealthy corporations in proportion to their value, and reducing the tax burden on farmers and small property holders. He also was strongly for anti-trust laws.

One of his canvass speeches, "Why I am a Democrat," was published in newspapers across the country. While he was governor, he also continued to write articles for the Boonsville Advertiser through an anonymous column called "Sharps and Flats." Freed from his name, he shared his opinions of current political events.

Stephens was also engaged in an ongoing military scandal with the Missouri National Guard due to the organization and failed reforms of the regiments within. One of his notable critics was Colonel Edwin Batdorf of the 1st Missouri who'd engage in debates with Stephens during the Spanish–American War. Batdorf would later file a dropped lawsuit in damages during Stephens' reorganization of the regiments which excluded Batdorf himself.

== Personal life ==
Stephens married Margaret Nelson of Boonville on October 5, 1880. She was the daughter of Margaret (née Wyan) and James M. Nelson, who was associated with the Central National Bank of Booneville and was one of the wealthiest residents of central Missouri. The couple did not have children. In 1890, they moved to Jefferson City. Around 1893, they move into Ivy Terrace, a Queen Anne style house on 500 East Capital Avenue in Jefferson City. They lived there until he became governor in 1897.

He was a Mason and a member of the Knights Templar. He was also a member of the Methodist Episcopal Church, South. He was a donor to Central College in Fayette, Missouri which named the Stephens Scientific Hall in his honor.

After he retired from politics, the couple moved to St. Louis and lived on Cabanne Avenue. In his later years, he suffered from failing vision and poor health. Stephens died at his home in St. Louis in 1923 at the age of 64 from heart disease. He was buried in Walnut Grove Cemetery in Boonville, Missouri with Masonic rituals.

Ivy Terrace, his former home, was listed on the National Register of Historic Places in 1990.

Party political offices
Preceded by Edward T. Noland	Democratic nominee for State Treasurer of Missouri; 1892	Succeeded by Frank L. Pitts
Preceded by William J. Stone	Democratic nominee for Governor of Missouri; 1896	Succeeded by Alexander Monroe Dockery
Political offices
Preceded by Edward T. Noland	State Treasurer of Missouri; 1890–1897	Succeeded by Frank L. Pitts
Preceded by William J. Stone	Governor of Missouri; 1897–1901	Succeeded by Alexander Monroe Dockery
