= James M. Seibert =

American politician (1847–1935)

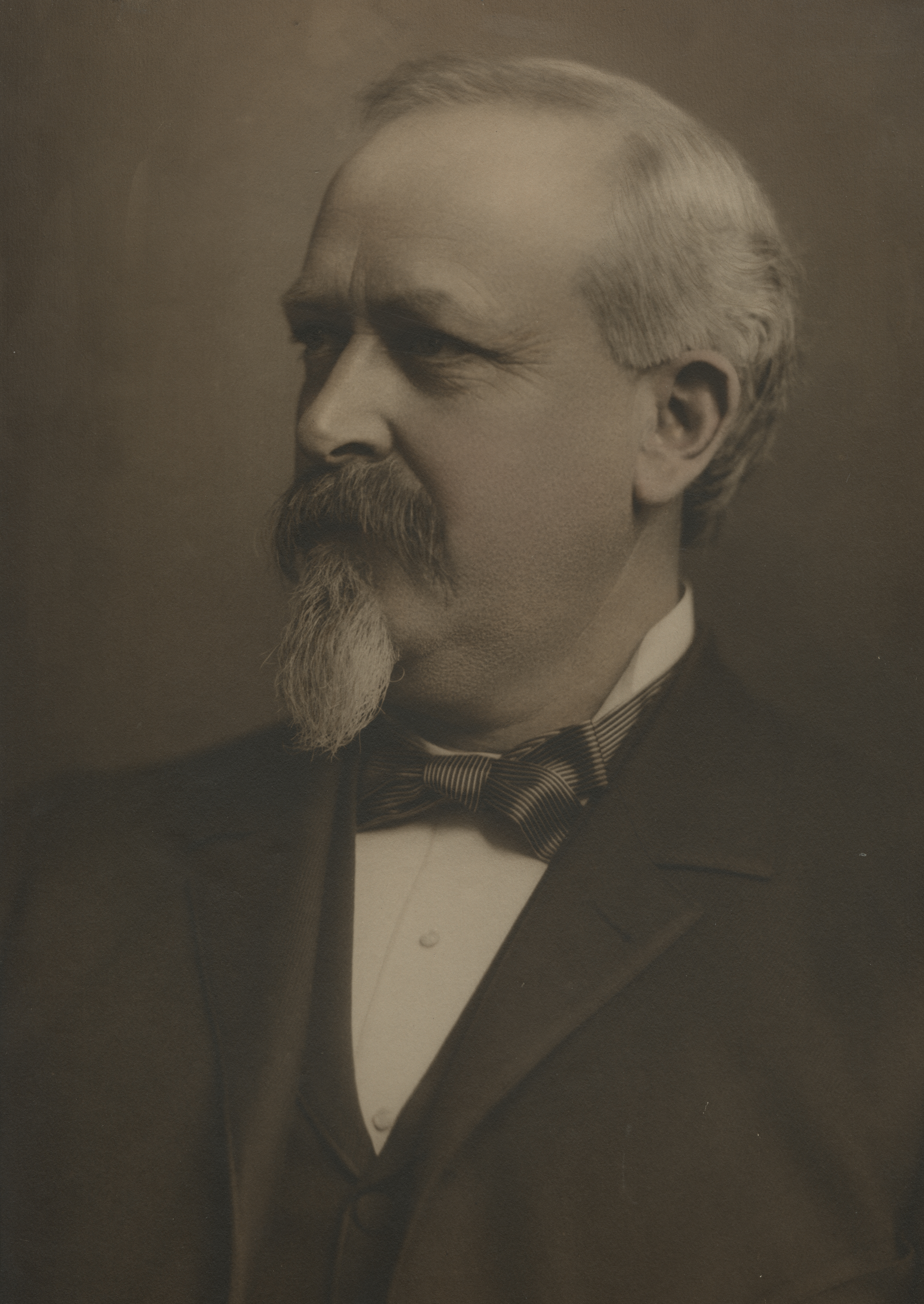

State Treasurer of Missouri
- In office 1885–1889
- Governor: John S. Marmaduke; Albert P. Morehouse
- Preceded by: Phillip Edward Chappell
- Succeeded by: Edward T. Noland

State Auditor of Missouri
- In office 1889–1901
- Preceded by: John Walker
- Succeeded by: Albert Otis Allen

Personal details
- Born: James Monroe Seibert; February 3, 1847 Perry County, Missouri, US
- Died: January 23, 1935 (aged 87) St. Louis, Missouri, US
- Party: Democratic
- Spouse: Emma Wilson (m. 1966)
- Children: 4
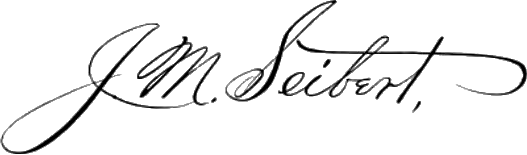
- Signature

James "Colonel" Monroe Seibert (February 3, 1847 – January 23, 1935) was an American politician. He served as State Treasurer of Missouri from 1885 to 1889, and as State Auditor of Missouri from 1889 to 1901.

== Biography ==
Seibert was born on February 3, 1847, in Perry County, Missouri, to Daniel Seibert and Melissa Seibert (née McCombs). His grandfather was Henry Seibert, an officer in the War of 1812 who later served in the Missouri General Assembly. Seibert is believed to have been named for President James Monroe.

Seibert studied at McKendree College. He moved to Cape Girardeau County in 1886, working in the mercantile and agricultural industries. For four years, he served as the county's sheriff, and later was county tax collector for six years.

A Democrat, Seibert served as State Treasurer of Missouri from 1885 to 1889. The State Treasurer's annual salary was increased to $2,000 during his term. He then served as State Auditor of Missouri from 1889 to 1901.

After his tenure as State Auditor ended, Seibert moved to St. Louis. There, he served as the city's tax commissioner from 1901 to 1905, and worked in the tax department of the Missouri Pacific Railroad between 1911 and 1928. He chaired the Missouri Democratic Committee and managed the Alexander M. Dockery gubernatorial campaign; he was a close friend of Dockery.

Seibert retired in 1929. He was Presbyterian. He had four children with his wife, Emma Abagail Wilson, who he married on December 27, 1866. He died on January 23, 1935, aged 87, in St. Louis. He is buried in Jackson, Missouri.

Political offices
Preceded by Phillip Edward Chappell	State Treasurer of Missouri; 1885–1889	Succeeded by Edward T. Noland
