= List of cemeteries in Missouri =

This list of cemeteries in Missouri includes currently operating, historical (closed for new interments), and defunct (graves abandoned or removed) cemeteries, columbaria, and mausolea which are historical and/or notable. It does not include pet cemeteries.

== Barry County ==
- Waldensian Church and Cemetery of Stone Prairie, near Monett; NRHP–listed

== Boone County ==
- Bond's Chapel Methodist Episcopal Church Cemetery
- Columbia Cemetery; NRHP–listed
- Jewell Cemetery State Historic Site; NRHP–listed
- Mount Zion Church and Cemetery; NRHP–listed

== Buchanan County ==
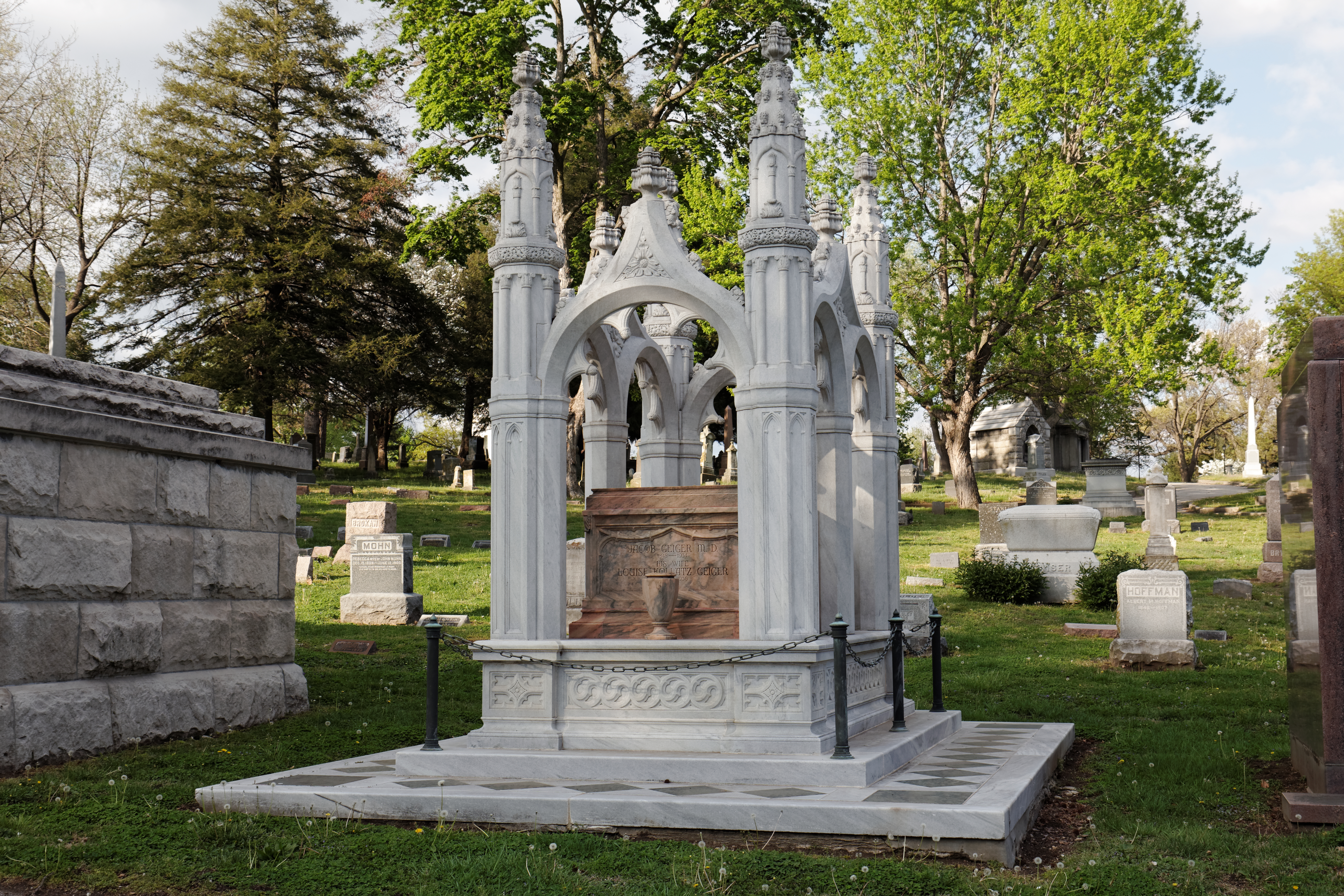
Mount Mora Cemetery in St. Joseph, Buchanan County

- Mount Mora Cemetery, St. Joseph; NRHP–listed

== Cape Girardeau County ==
- Cape County Memorial Park Cemetery, outside Cape Girardeau
- Old Lorimier Cemetery, Cape Girardeau city; NRHP–listed

== Cole County ==
- Jefferson City National Cemetery, Jefferson City; NRHP–listed

== Clay County ==
- Aker Cemetery, Smithville; NRHP–listed
- Mt. Memorial Cemetery, Liberty; NRHP–listed

== Greene County ==
- Berry Cemetery (or Holy Resurrection Cemetery), Ash Grove; NRHP–listed
- Hazelwood Cemetery, Springfield; NRHP–listed
- Springfield National Cemetery, Springfield; NRHP–listed

== Jackson County ==
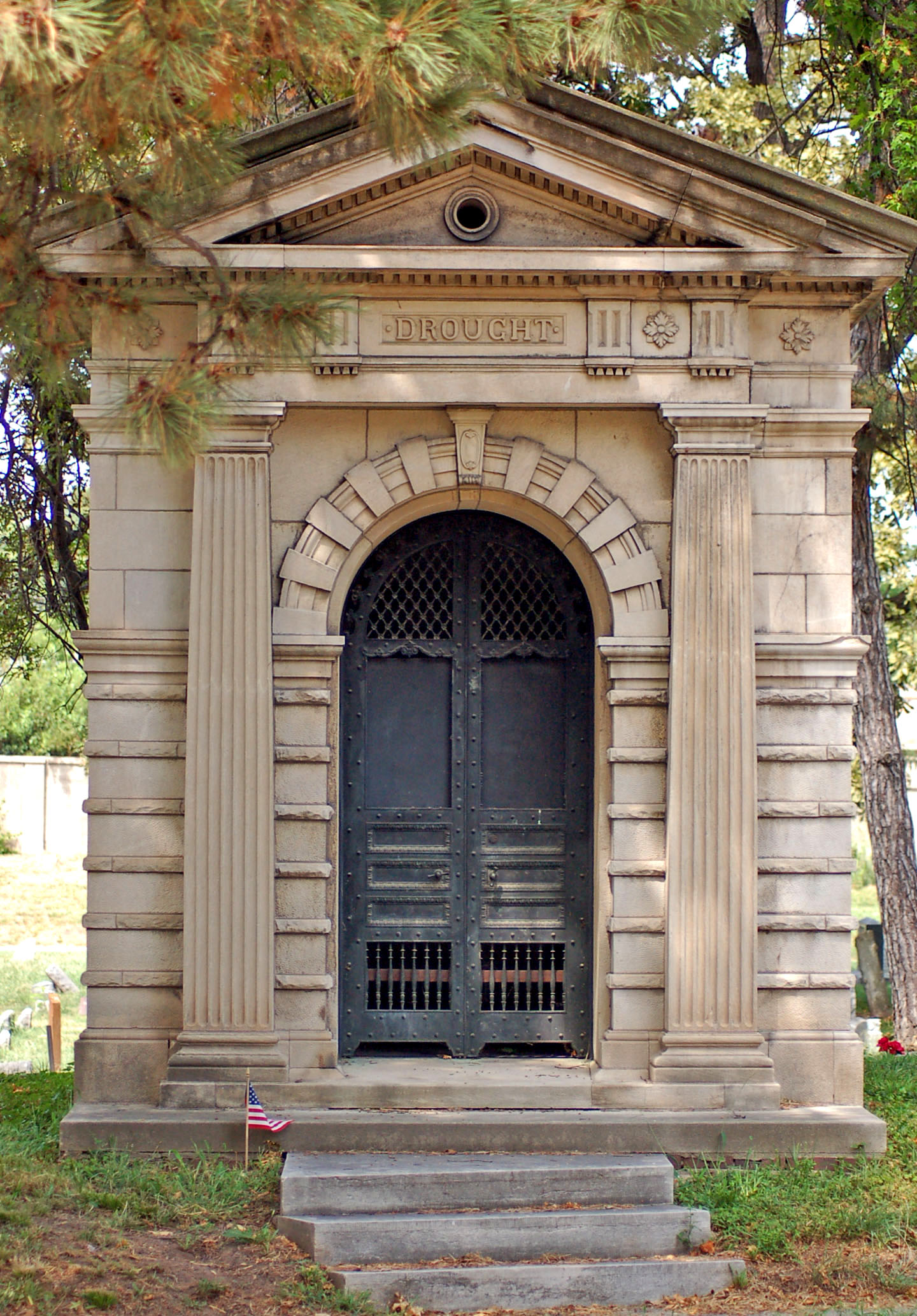
Elmwood Cemetery in Kansas City, Jackson County

- Elmwood Cemetery, Kansas City; NRHP–listed
- Forest Hill Calvary Cemetery, Kansas City
- Lee's Summit Historical Cemetery, Lee's Summit
- Union Cemetery, Kansas City; NRHP–listed

== Jasper County ==
- Cave Spring School and Cave Spring Cemetery, Sarcoxie; NRHP–listed

== Jefferson County ==
- Gov. Daniel Dunklin's Grave State Historic Site, Herculaneum; NRHP–listed

== Lafayette County ==
- Confederate Memorial State Historic Site, Higginsville; NRHP–listed

== Marion County ==
- Grand View Burial Park, Hannibal

== Ralls County ==
- Greenlawn Methodist Church and Cemetery, near Perry; NRHP–listed

== Ray County ==
- New Hope Primitive Baptist Church, Richmond; NRHP–listed

== Saline County ==
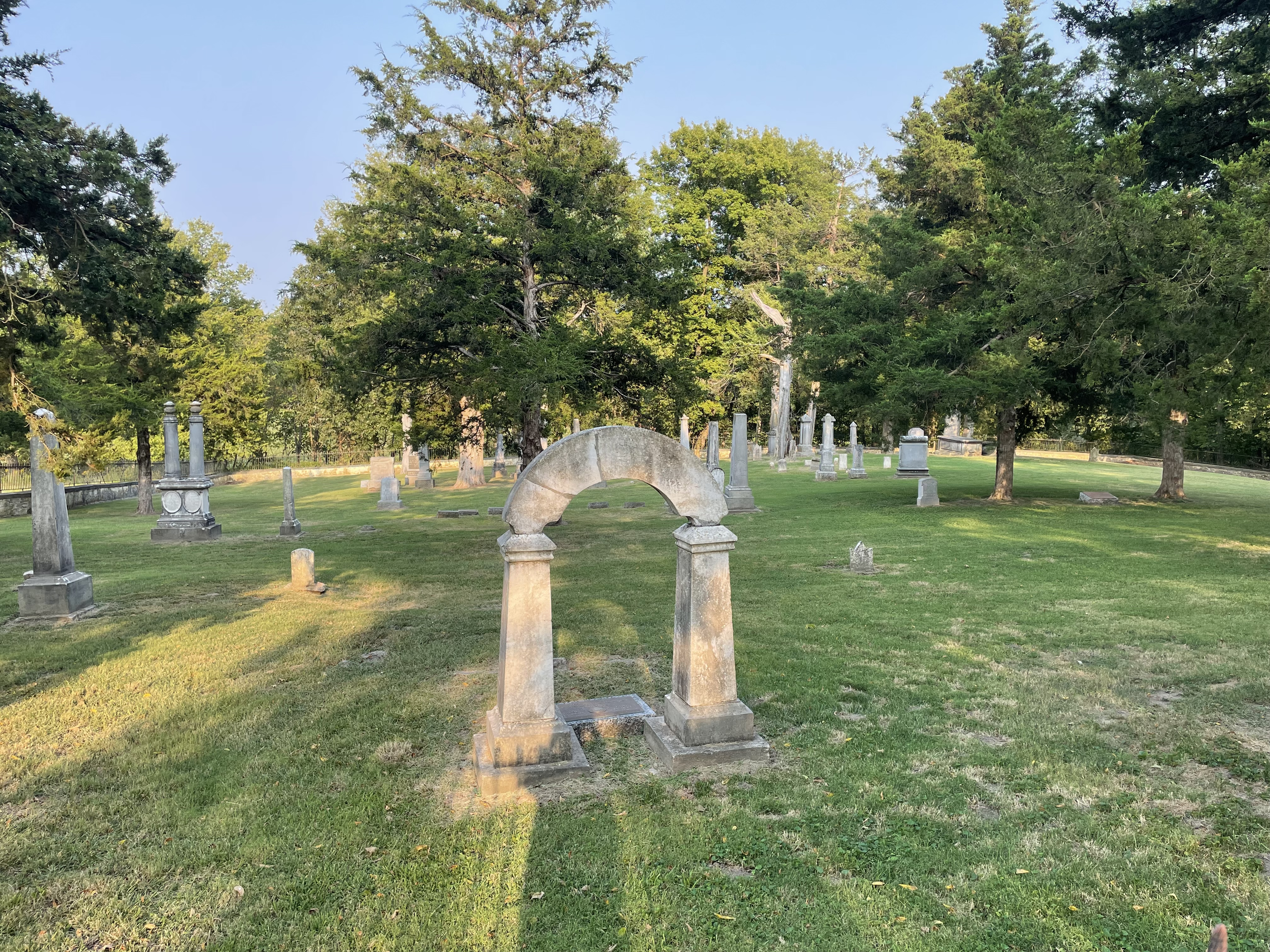
Sappington Cemetery State Historic Site, near Arrow Rock, Saline County

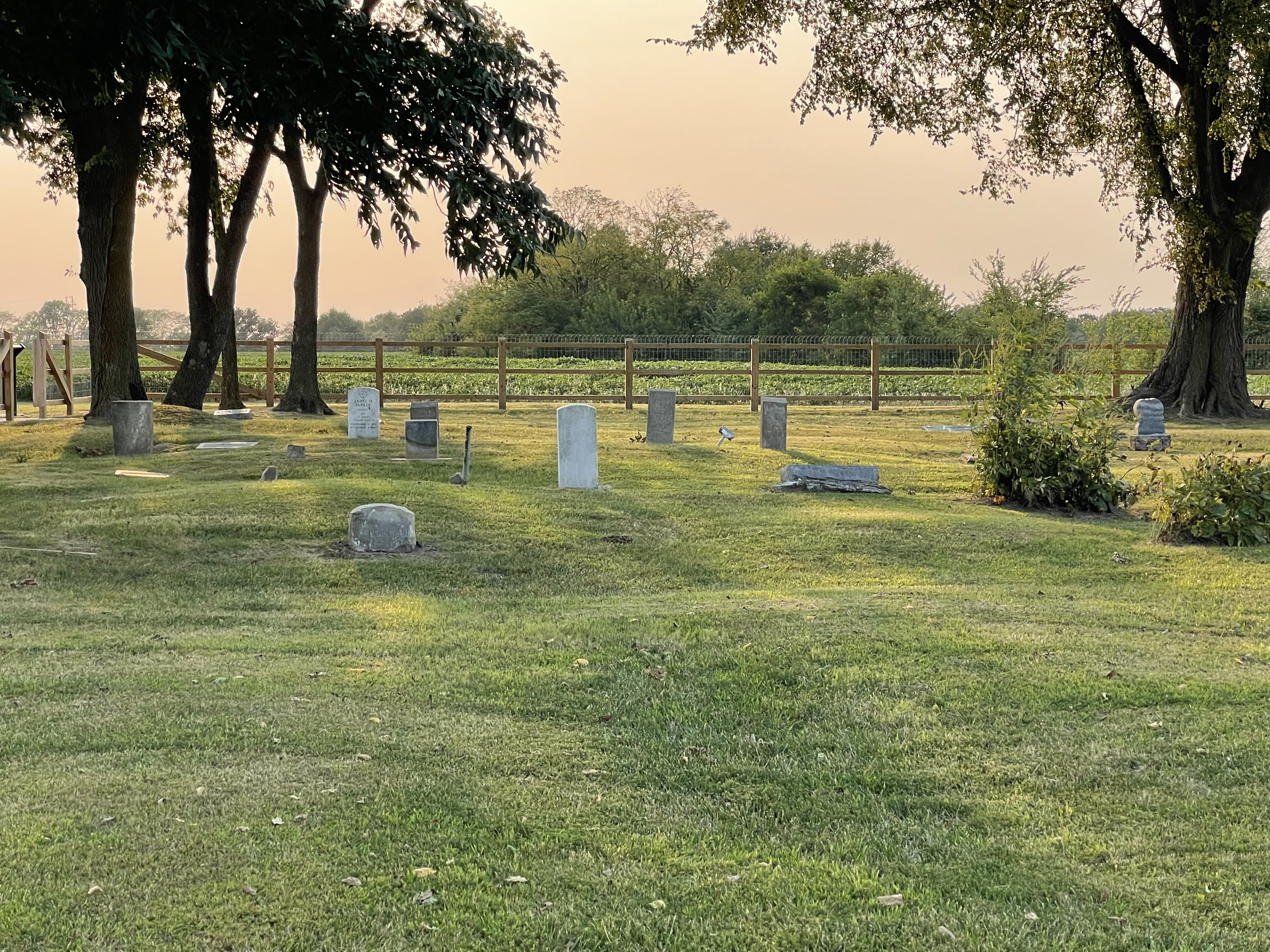
Sappington African-American graves at Sappington Cemetery State Historic Site, near Arrow Rock, Saline County

- Sappington Cemetery State Historic Site, near Arrow Rock

== Ste. Genevieve County ==
- Ste. Genevieve Memorial Cemetery, Ste. Genevieve city; NRHP–listed

== St. Francois County ==
- Farmington State Hospital No. 4 Cemetery, Farmington; NRHP–listed

== St. Louis ==
- Bellefontaine Cemetery; NRHP–listed
- Calvary Cemetery
- New Mount Sinai Cemetery; NRHP–listed

== St. Louis County ==
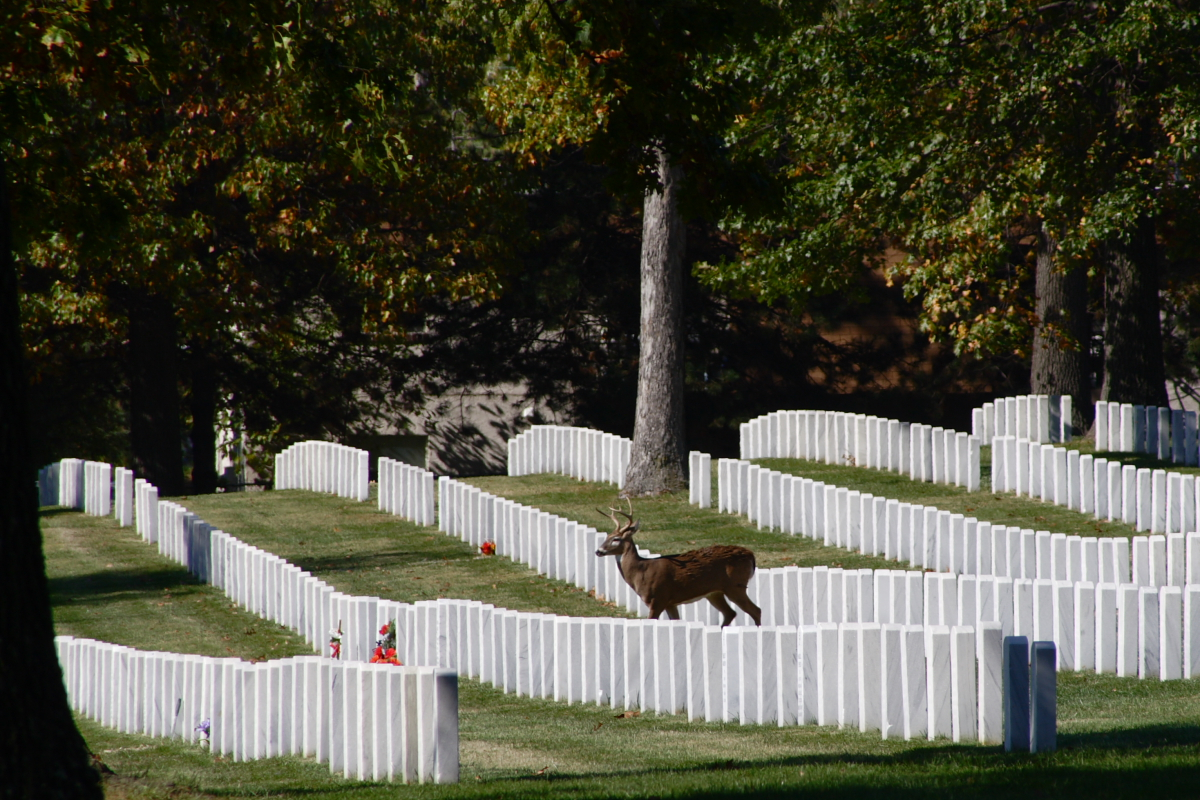
Jefferson Barracks National Cemetery in Lemay, St. Louis County

- Chesed Shel Emeth Cemetery, University City
- Cold Water Cemetery, Florissant in St. Louis; NRHP–listed
- Father Dickson Cemetery, Crestwood; NRHP–listed
- Greenwood Cemetery; NRHP–listed
- Jefferson Barracks National Cemetery, Lemay; NRHP–listed
- Quinette Cemetery, Kirkwood
- Sacred Heart Cemetery, Florissant in St. Louis
- Washington Park Cemetery, Berkeley

== Sullivan County ==
- Camp Ground Church and Cemetery, Milan; NRHP–listed
- Henry Cemetery, near Reger; NRHP–listed

== Washington County ==
- Horine Cemetery, Richwoods

== Wayne County ==
- Old Greenville (23WE637), Greenville; NRHP–listed

== See also ==
- List of cemeteries in the United States
- Pioneer cemetery
- National Register of Historic Places listings in Missouri
