= Hanley Hills, Missouri =

- Village
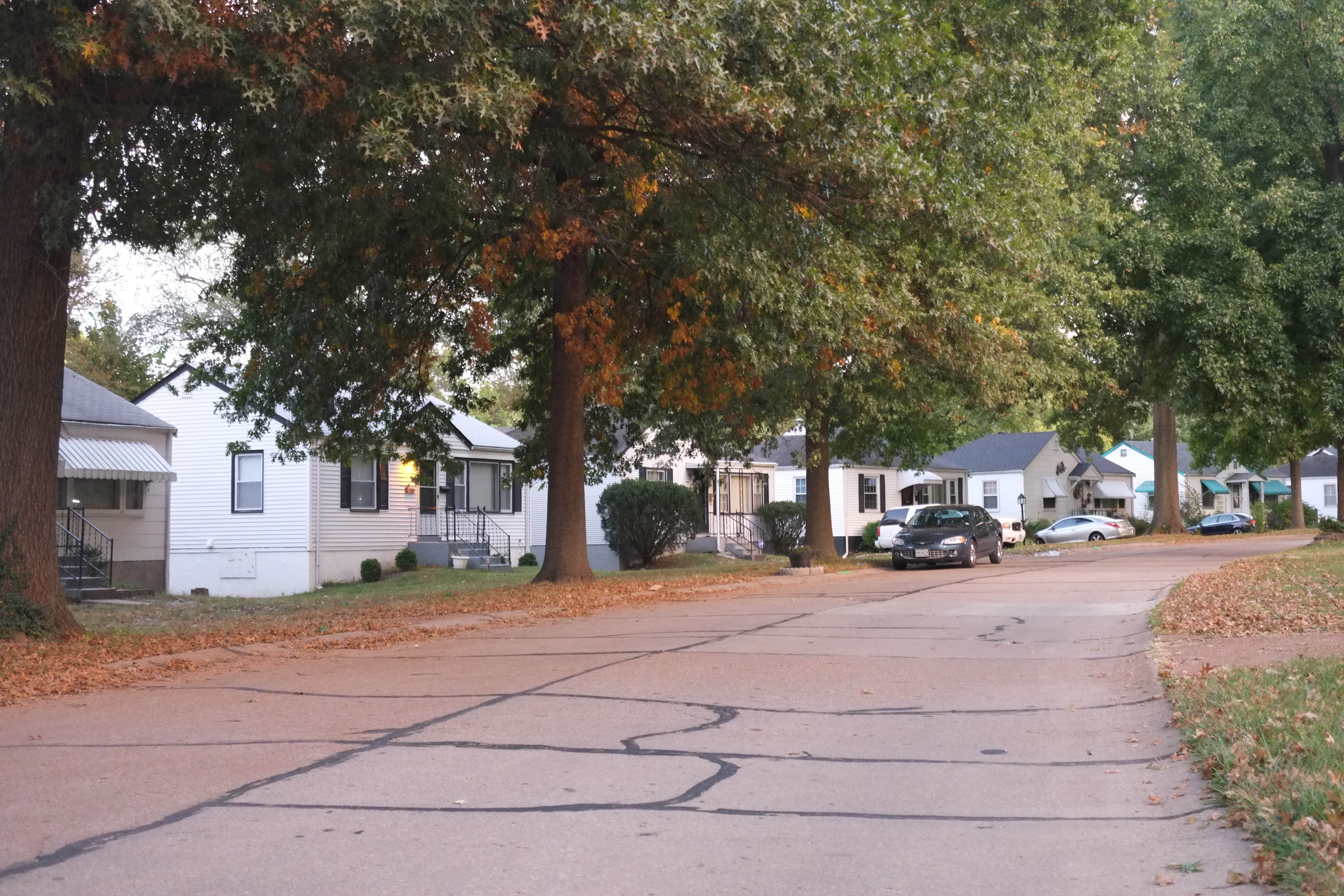
- Houses in Hanley Hills, October 2016

- Location of Hanley Hills, Missouri
- Coordinates: 38°41′08″N 90°19′29″W
- Country: United States
- State: Missouri
- County: St. Louis
- Township: University

Area
  - Total: 0.36 sq mi (0.93 km^{2})
  - Land: 0.36 sq mi (0.93 km^{2})
  - Water: 0 sq mi (0.00 km^{2})
- Elevation: 558 ft (170 m)

Population (2020)
  - Total: 2,009
  - Density: 5,598.2/sq mi (2,161.48/km^{2})
- Time zone: UTC-6 (Central (CST))
  - Summer (DST): UTC-5 (CDT)
- ZIP code: 63133
- Area code(s): 314/557
- FIPS code: 29-30196
- GNIS feature ID: 2398239
- Website: www.hanleyhills.org

Hanley Hills is a village in University Township, St. Louis County, Missouri, United States. The population was 2,009 at the 2020 census.

== Geography ==
Hanley Hills is located at 38°41′11″N 90°19′35″W (38.686251, -90.326371).

According to the United States Census Bureau, the village has a total area of 0.36 square miles (0.93 km^{2}), all land.

== Demographics ==
Historical population
Census	Pop.	Note	%±
1950	2,219		—
1960	3,308		49.1%
1970	2,801		−15.3%
1980	2,439		−12.9%
1990	2,325		−4.7%
2000	2,124		−8.6%
2010	2,101		−1.1%
2020	2,009		−4.4%
U.S. Decennial Census

=== Racial and ethnic composition ===
Hanley Hills, Missouri – Racial and ethnic composition Note: the US Census treats Hispanic/Latino as an ethnic category. This table excludes Latinos from the racial categories and assigns them to a separate category. Hispanics/Latinos may be of any race.
Race / Ethnicity (NH = Non-Hispanic)	Pop 2000	Pop 2010	Pop 2020	% 2000	% 2010	% 2020
White alone (NH)	453	246	210	21.33%	11.71%	10.45%
Black or African American alone (NH)	1,627	1,785	1,642	76.60%	84.96%	81.73%
Native American or Alaska Native alone (NH)	1	2	1	0.05%	0.10%	0.05%
Asian alone (NH)	3	9	5	0.14%	0.43%	0.25%
Native Hawaiian or Pacific Islander alone (NH)	0	0	0	0.00%	0.00%	0.00%
Other race alone (NH)	4	0	13	0.19%	0.00%	0.65%
Mixed race or Multiracial (NH)	26	32	78	1.22%	1.52%	3.88%
Hispanic or Latino (any race)	10	27	60	0.47%	1.29%	2.99%
Total	2,124	2,101	2,009	100.00%	100.00%	100.00%

=== 2020 census ===
As of the 2020 census, Hanley Hills had a population of 2,009. The median age was 38.4 years. 23.9% of residents were under the age of 18 and 16.0% of residents were 65 years of age or older. For every 100 females there were 79.5 males, and for every 100 females age 18 and over there were 72.9 males age 18 and over.

100.0% of residents lived in urban areas, while 0.0% lived in rural areas.

There were 854 households in Hanley Hills, of which 31.0% had children under the age of 18 living in them. Of all households, 20.5% were married-couple households, 18.7% were households with a male householder and no spouse or partner present, and 51.2% were households with a female householder and no spouse or partner present. About 30.6% of all households were made up of individuals and 11.5% had someone living alone who was 65 years of age or older.

There were 944 housing units, of which 9.5% were vacant. The homeowner vacancy rate was 1.0% and the rental vacancy rate was 8.6%.

=== 2010 census ===
As of the census of 2010, there were 2,101 people, 867 households, and 571 families living in the village. The population density was 5,836.1 inhabitants per square mile (2,253.3/km^{2}). There were 940 housing units at an average density of 2,611.1 per square mile (1,008.2/km^{2}). The racial makeup of the village was 12.0% White, 85.3% African American, 0.1% Native American, 0.4% Asian, 0.3% from other races, and 1.9% from two or more races. Hispanic or Latino of any race were 1.3% of the population.

There were 867 households, of which 34.1% had children under the age of 18 living with them, 23.3% were married couples living together, 36.4% had a female householder with no husband present, 6.1% had a male householder with no wife present, and 34.1% were non-families. 29.3% of all households were made up of individuals, and 7.7% had someone living alone who was 65 years of age or older. The average household size was 2.42 and the average family size was 2.95.

The median age in the village was 38.1 years. 25.1% of residents were under the age of 18; 8.9% were between the ages of 18 and 24; 25.8% were from 25 to 44; 30.9% were from 45 to 64; and 9.2% were 65 years of age or older. The gender makeup of the village was 44.6% male and 55.4% female.

=== 2000 census ===
As of the census of 2000, there were 2,124 people, 864 households, and 582 families living in the village. The population density was 5,721.9 inhabitants per square mile (2,209.2/km^{2}). There were 939 housing units at an average density of 2,529.6 per square mile (976.7/km^{2}). The racial makeup of the village was 21.61% White, 76.74% African American, 0.05% Native American, 0.14% Asian, 0.19% from other races, and 1.27% from two or more races. Hispanic or Latino of any race were 0.47% of the population.

There were 864 households, out of which 32.5% had children under the age of 18 living with them, 31.1% were married couples living together, 30.7% had a female householder with no husband present, and 32.6% were non-families. 28.8% of all households were made up of individuals, and 9.0% had someone living alone who was 65 years of age or older. The average household size was 2.46 and the average family size was 3.01.

In the village, the population was spread out, with 27.0% under the age of 18, 9.1% from 18 to 24, 30.0% from 25 to 44, 24.1% from 45 to 64, and 9.7% who were 65 years of age or older. The median age was 36 years. For every 100 females, there were 77.1 males. For every 100 females age 18 and over, there were 70.1 males.

The median income for a household in the village was $33,802, and the median income for a family was $37,368. Males had a median income of $30,833 versus $25,969 for females. The per capita income for the village was $15,906. About 6.3% of families and 9.3% of the population were below the poverty line, including 11.8% of those under age 18 and 7.7% of those age 65 or over.

== Education ==
It is in the Normandy Schools Collaborative school district. Washington Elementary School is in Hanley Hills and Vinita Park. It began operations in 1930.

The comprehensive high school of the district is Normandy High School.
