= Governor Marmaduke =

Governor Marmaduke may refer to:

- John S. Marmaduke (1833–1887), 25th Governor of Missouri
- Meredith Marmaduke (1791–1864), 8th Governor of Missouri
