= Lee Sheldon =

Lee Sheldon may refer to:

- Lee Sheldon (writer), game developer and writer
- Stagger Lee Sheldon, American murderer
