= Old Greenville =

Old Greenville may refer to:

- Old Greenville (23WE637) in Missouri, United States
- Old Greenville, Mississippi
- Old Greenville City Hall, South Carolina
