= Mary Johnson (singer) =

American singer

- Also known as: Signifying Mary
- Born: Mary Smith or Fair or Williams; March 29, 1898 or 1900; Yazoo City, Mississippi, United States
- Died: July 20, 1983 (age 83–85) St Louis, Missouri, U.S.
- Genres: Classic female blues
- Occupations: Singer, accordionist, songwriter
- Instruments: Vocals, accordion
- Years active: 1920s–1930s
- Formerly of: Lonnie Johnson

Mary Johnson (March 29, 1898 or 1900 – July 20, 1983) was an American classic female blues singer, accordionist and songwriter. Her most noted tracks are "Dream Daddy Blues" and "Western Union Blues." She wrote several of the songs she recorded, including "Barrel House Flat Blues", "Key to the Mountain Blues" and "Black Men Blues." Johnson worked with Peetie Wheatstraw, Tampa Red, Kokomo Arnold and Roosevelt Sykes, among others. She was married to the blues musician Lonnie Johnson.

== Biography ==
She was born in Yazoo City, Mississippi. According to the researchers Bob Eagle and Eric LeBlanc, she was probably born Mary Smith in 1898, or possibly Mary Fair in 1900; other sources give her name as Mary Williams.

Prior to her recording career, Johnson relocated to St. Louis, Missouri, in 1915, where in her teenage years she worked with several of the leading blues musicians of the time. She married Lonnie Johnson; the marriage lasted from 1925 to 1932. They had six children.

She recorded twenty-two tracks between 1929 and 1936: eight songs in 1929, six in 1930, two in 1932, four in 1934, and two (her final recordings) in 1936. Her accompanists on these recordings included Roosevelt Sykes, Peetie Wheatstraw, Tampa Red, and Kokomo Arnold.

Johnson worked in the St. Louis area until the mid-1940s. Her song "Key to the Mountain Blues" was recorded in 1948 by Jesse Thomas as "Mountain Key Blues."

By the 1950s, Johnson had long since given up her career in music. She focused on religion and worked in a hospital. In 1960, she was interviewed by the blues historian Paul Oliver, and extracts from this interview were included in his book Conversation with the Blues. Oliver stated, "Living with her mother Emma Williams in an apartment on Biddle Street, St. Louis, Johnson has known considerable poverty for many years."

Johnson died in St. Louis in 1983, though some sources suggest 1970. In 2016 the Killer Blues Headstone Project placed the headstone for Mary Johnson at Greenwood Cemetery in Hillsdale, Missouri.

All of her known recordings are on the compilation album Complete Works in Chronological Order, 1929–1936, released by Document Records in 1995.

== See also ==
- List of classic female blues singers
