= Ira L. Cooper =

American police detective (c.1878–1939)

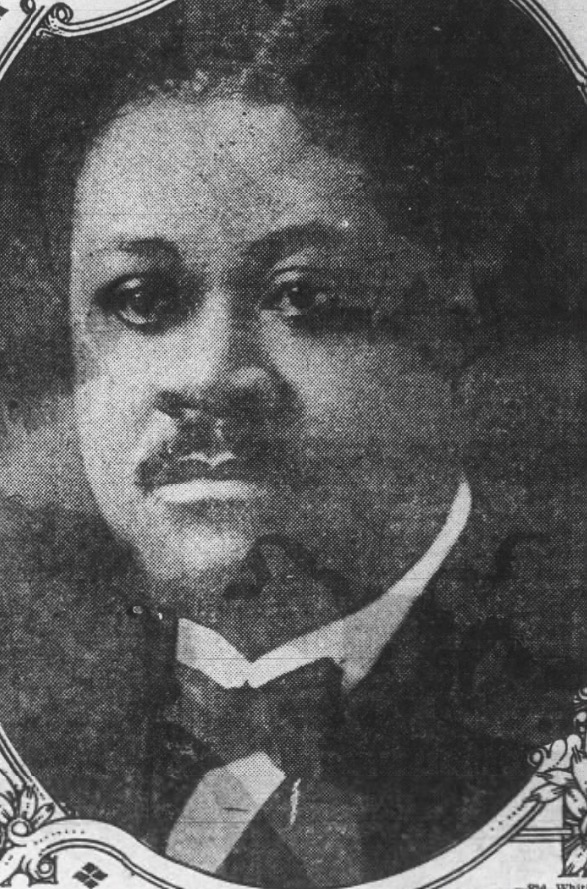
- Cooper in a 1926 publication of the St. Louis Globe-Democrat
- Born: Ira Luther Cooper c. 1878; Mexico, Missouri, US
- Died: February 15, 1939 (aged 61); St. Louis, Missouri, US
- Burial place: Washington Park Cemetery
- Education: Illinois College of Optometry
- Occupation: Police detective
- Years active: 1906–1939

Ira Luther Cooper (c. 1878 – February 15, 1939) was an American police detective. He was the first African-American police detective in St. Louis.

== Biography ==
Cooper was born c. 1878, in Mexico, Missouri, the son of schoolteacher E. J. Cooper. He intended to work as an optometrist, so studied at the Illinois College of Optometry, then moved to St. Louis to practice. He "starved for a year", as he described it, then left the industry for public service. Between optometry and policing, he worked as a treasurer, mail sorter, and journalist.

On June 15, 1906, Cooper joined the St. Louis Metropolitan Police Department. After his training in 1907, he was named a detective. A skilled detective, he was named sergeant then lieutenant, in 1923 and 1930, respectively. During his time, he was the only African-American police detective west of the Mississippi River, as well as the first African-American police lieutenant in St. Louis. He primarily solved kidnappings and robberies, such as the kidnapping of Adolphus Busch Orthwein. For a robbery case, he earned $3,000, the highest payout for a St. Louis detective. He prevented a 1911 lynching by threatening to shoot whoever approached he or the potential victim. Reportedly, he solved every case given to him.

Cooper was married to Lucana Cooper, and they had two children together. He died on February 15, 1939, aged 61, in St. Louis, from heart disease. He had previously been hospitalized for two months due to illness, returning to police work after recovering, though again left service in his last three weeks. He is buried in Washington Park Cemetery.

Cooper's legacy has primarily been driven by Gregory Carr, a faculty of Harris–Stowe State University. Prior to Carr, Cooper had a "dearth of information", with a 2018 article by the National Endowment for the Humanities saying he "doesn't even have a Wikipedia page". Carr produced a single-actor play about Cooper, and pushes for a street to be named for him, and for a statue of him to be erected.
