= Alice Curtice Moyer =

US writer and suffragist

Alice J. Curtice Moyer-Wing
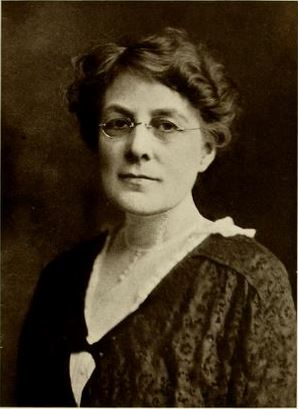
- Born: 1866; Du Quoin, Illinois
- Died: 1937 (aged 70–71)

Alice Curtice Moyer Wing (1866 - August 16, 1937) was an American writer and suffragist. Her book A Romance of the Road is a manifesto of the suffragist argument.

== Biography ==
Alice Curtice Moyer Wing was born in 1866 in Du Quoin, Illinois. While still a baby the family moved to Southwest Missouri, where they were pioneers in Dallas County. In A Romance of the Road, Alice described her parents as "a sturdy young father who cleared and tilled the soil, making what use he could of this Eastern education by teaching the district school in the winter, and ... a pretty young mother, who was never too busy to put on a clean collar (of her own crocheting) when he was expected from the field." The Romance of the Road was a bright, entertaining, good book, full of practical knowledge and everyday events which were made so heartfelt and interesting that one felt the better for having read it.

Moyer was the eldest of six children; five were born in Missouri; they lived on the homestead until she was fifteen, when her parents moved into the county seat so their children could have a better education, but the teaching was meagre and the instruction of her father aided her more than her schooling.

Life on the homestead taught her resourcefulness, and how to endure discomforts, for they were pioneer children and faced many hardships. Her father, Charles L. Curtice, was a New Yorker by birth, but was in the Sixth Illinois Cavalry, during the Civil War, and had a service of four years and seven months to his credit. Her mother was Nancy Elizabeth Tinsley, of Tennessee, whose father, of English ancestry, was a Virginian.

Through her father she was related to the Wing family: his mother was Miriam Wing, of Hoosick, New York. Through a daughter of Rev. Stephen Bachelder (or Bachelor), Deborah (wife of Rev. John Wing), she can trace her ancestry back to the famous preacher and reformer, who was vicar of Whersvell, Hants, England, before coming to America. By reason of her ancestral connection from the Rev. Stephen Bachelder (or Bachelor), she was eligible for membership in the Colonial Dames of America, and through David Wing, a Quaker of Providence, who served in the War of the Revolution as an enlisted soldier in Col. John Blair's regiment, Albany County Militia, she was eligible for membership in the Daughters of the American Revolution. Moyer shares ancestral claims on the Rev. Bachelor with Daniel Webster, J. G. Whittier and other writers.

In the early 1900s, the "Wing Family of America" held a reunion which brought many of the estimated 100,000 relatives to the family camp fires. Tuner C. Wing, president of the Gorman Paint Company, of which firm Moyer was secretary and treasurer, was a prominent St. Louis member of the Wing Family and in 1915 Moyer married him. Sir Arthur Wing Pinero, the playwright, was a member of the English branch of the Wing family.

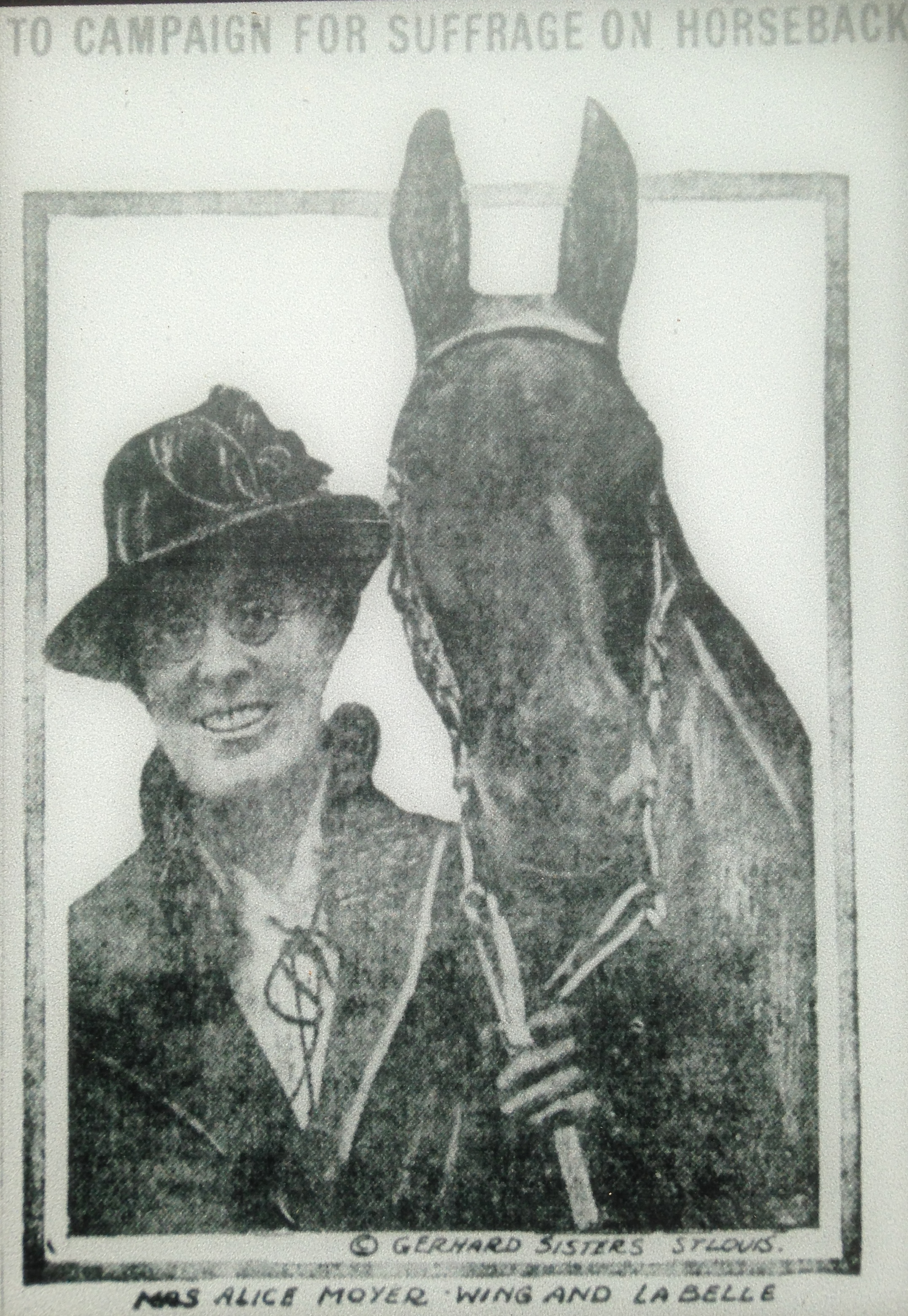
Alice Curtice Moyer, Gerhard Sisters

While her children, Selma Van Buskirk and Charles Curtice Moyer, were quite small, it became necessary for Moyer to support her family at the death of her first husband, Alberson Moyer. She took the surest way into the business world for a woman, that of stenographer, and came to St. Louis from El Paso, Texas, to take up this study. At the end of ten weeks she took a position for a year and a half in that capacity, and then moved to Kansas, where she became correspondent for a manufacturing concern. Always keeping her children with her, she studied with them and sewed for them at night after office hours. In addition to this she wrote stories for a juvenile paper, and now and then for magazines and newspapers. She said, as Sir Walter Raleigh said of himself, "I can toil terribly." It was while in Kansas that Alice began her work in the suffrage movement.

After five years in Kansas, the threat of a nervous breakdown sent her on the road as a commercial traveler, a position which she held for five years. During this period, her children made their home with their grandparents, who still lived where Moyer spent her girlhood days, in Buffalo, Dallas County. With her health restored by the road work, she again held office positions as correspondent, department manager, district manager, and instructor for traveling forces in Kansas City, Chicago, and Birmingham, moving to St. Louis in February, 1913, to be secretary and treasurer of the Gorman Paint Company.

Moyer headed the speakers bureau of the St Louis Equal Suffrage League and was selected as the St. Louis member of the State Suffrage Press Committee. In 1916 the Moyer Wings moved to rural Wayne County Missouri and lived on a farm northeast of the county seat in Greenville near Burbank. That move from St Louis followed an incident during which Alice was accosted on the street in St. Louis following one of her suffrage speeches and was choked by a man who threatened her life if she persisted in speaking for equal suffrage. In 1917–18, she resumed her suffrage work in a horseback campaign across the Ozarks. She rode the eastern Missouri Ozarks with her horse, LaBelle, and chronicled her efforts promoting equal suffrage in a series of humorous articles in the St. Louis Post Dispatch Sunday magazine

In the 1920s she commuted from Greenville to St. Louis, Kansas City, and Jefferson City while she worked as chief of the State Industrial Inspection Department under Governor Arthur M. Hyde. She was reappointed in 1925 by Sam A. Baker. She was the first woman to head any state department in Missouri. She served until 1927 when the position was abolished in favor of the State Labor Department. During her terms in office, Moyer Wing lobbied against violators of the child labor laws, for the nine-hour law for women, and for reducing the number of industrial accidents. She appointed women as Industrial Inspectors and insisted that they be paid a salary equal to men in that position. In 1924 she unsuccessfully ran for the Republican nomination for congress in Missouri's 13th District. She remained an active member of the Missouri League of Women Voters and retired from public life but continued to write, publishing 3 articles in Scribner's Magazine (Men Only, Sept 1926; When a Woman is the Head, June 1927; and The Vote Our First Comeback, 1928 Scribner's 84:259-264).

She died on August 16, 1937, and she is buried near her Wayne County home in the Crossroads Church Cemetery on Wayne County Route 502 northeast of Greenville. An interpretive panel about her life and work is displayed in the Greenville Recreation Area on US Route 67 at Wappapello Lake.
