= Chesed Shel Emeth Cemetery =

Jewish graveyard in St. Louis, Missouri

Coordinates: 38.671525°N 90.334190°W

- Interactive map of Chesed Shel Emeth Cemetery

Details
- Established: 1893
- Location: University City, Missouri
- Country: United States

The Chesed Shel Emeth Cemetery is a Jewish graveyard located in University City, Missouri, an inner ring suburb of St. Louis.

== History ==
The cemetery was founded by Russian immigrants in 1893 in order to provide access to Jewish burial no matter one's financial means. These immigrants founded the Chesed Shel Emeth Society in order to bury their deceased after the immigrants found rituals and traditions of the local Orthodox synagogues unfamiliar. In the 1960s Chesed Shel Emeth congregation purchased a thirty acres piece of land in Chesterfield, again following the westward movement of the Jewish community. Called the White Road Cemetery it has the potentiality for growth over the next 200 years to hold the entire St. Louis Jewish population. As of 2019, the cemetery had about 22,500 plots.

== Vandalism ==
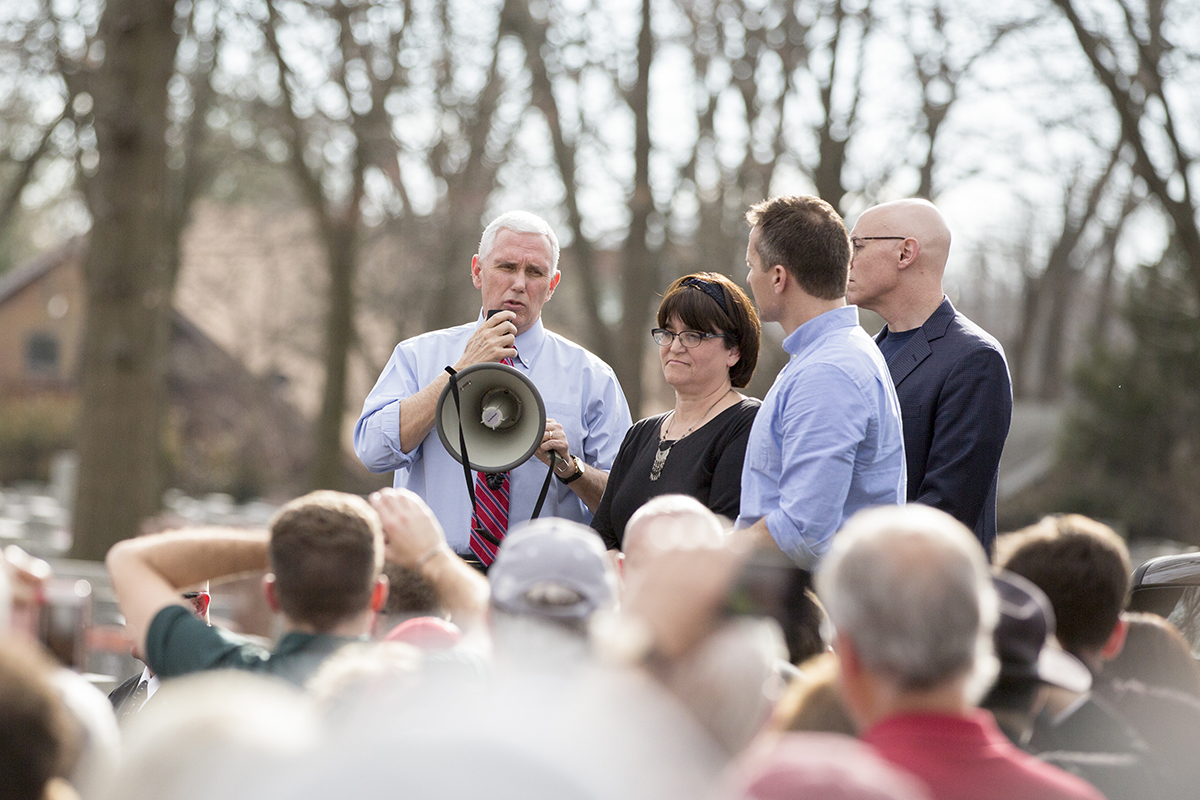
Vice President Mike Pence speaks to family members and volunteers during his visit to the Chesed Shel Emeth Cemetery in 2017.

On the morning of February 20, 2017, a vandal toppled, overturned, and dismembered 154 gravestones at the cemetery. The headstones, many marking graves from the 1920s through 1940s, were made of granite, marble, and other materials, and hand-carved in English, Hebrew, or Yiddish.

The vandalism drew national attention and came amidst a series of bomb threats, attacks, and other vandalism against Jewish institutions across the United States. A week after the vandalism at Chesed Shel Emeth, more than 100 headstones were topped at the Mt. Carmel Jewish Cemetery in Philadelphia.

On April 25, 2018, St. Louis County prosecutors announced that they had charged Alzado Harris in connection to the vandalism. Prosecutors stated that the man reported being drunk and angry at friends during the vandalism and that he appeared to have no antisemitic motivation. In March 2019, Harris was sentences to three years of probation by the St. Louis County Circuit Court. According to the Anti-Defamation League, there was no indication that Harris was motivated by hate.

== Notable burials ==
- Haim Fishel Epstein (1874–1942), rabbi
- Ken Holtzman (1945-2024), baseball player

== See also ==
- List of cemeteries in Missouri
- 2017 Jewish Community Center bomb threats
