= Father Dickson Cemetery =

Cemetery in Crestwood, St. Louis County, Missouri

- U.S. National Register of Historic Places
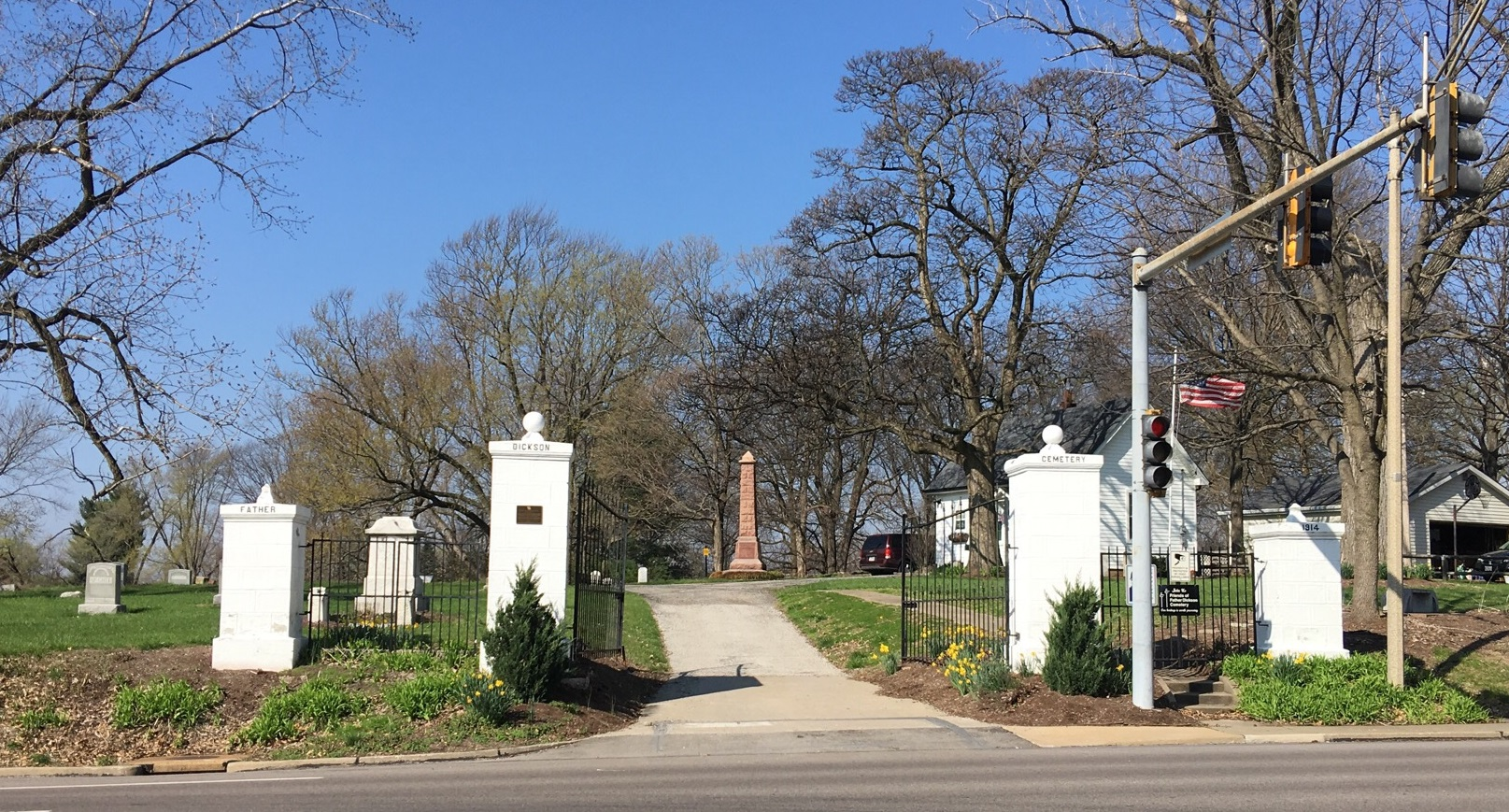
- Location: Crestwood, St. Louis County, Missouri, U.S.
- Coordinates: 38.5658°N 90.3858°W
- Area: 12 acres (4.9 ha)
- Built: August 30, 1903
- NRHP reference No.: 14001125
- Added to NRHP: October 6, 2021

Father Dickson Cemetery is a historic African-American cemetery located on 845 South Sappington Road in Crestwood, St. Louis County, Missouri.

It has been listed as one of the National Register of Historic Places since October 6, 2021.

== History ==
The cemetery is named after abolitionist Moses Dickson, who is buried at this cemetery. It sits on more than 12 acres and roughly 12,000 people are buried there. Many of the burials include black military veterans, leaders within the Underground Railroad network, formerly enslaved people, and lynching victims.

In 1988, the Friends of Father Dickson Cemetery group was started in hopes of maintaining the aging cemetery and preserving history. Other nearby historic African American cemeteries include Washington Park Cemetery (1920), Quinette Cemetery (1866), and Greenwood Cemetery (1874).

== Notable burials ==
- Moses Dickson (1824–1901), his body was moved here in 1903 with the dedication of the cemetery
- Henry Q. "Steamboat" Lewis (1886–1965)
- Pinetop Sparks (1910–1935), he was buried in an unmarked grave, although a headstone was added in 2014
- James Milton Turner (1840–1915)

== See also ==
- List of cemeteries in Missouri
- National Register of Historic Places listings in St. Louis County, Missouri
