= Haim Fishel Epstein =

American-Lithuanian rabbi (1874–1942)

Haim Fishel Epstein (May 6, 1874 – July 5, 1942) was a Lithuanian-American rabbi.

== Life ==
Epstein was born on May 6, 1874, in Taurage, Kovno Governorate, Russian Empire, the son of David-Shlomo Epstein and Zipa Shereshefsky.

Considered a child prodigy, Epstein was sent to study at the Telshe Yeshiva when he was young. He wrote his first book when he was sixteen, Chinuch le-Na'ar (a commentary on Sefer ha-Chinuch). He also enrolled at the Volozhin Yeshiva that year, and when he was eighteen he was ordained a rabbi by Rabbi Chaim Soloveitchik and Rabbi Shlomo Cohen of Vilna. Unusually for an Orthodox yeshiva student, he also studied secular subjects at a gymnasium in Siedlce and received the equivalent of a high school diploma from there. Interested in religious Haskalah, he published Hebrew poems about Zionism for Ha-Pisgah. He was also active in the early Zionist movement, aligning with the Lovers of Zion, attending a Zionist conference in Minsk in 1902, and becoming one of the founders of Mizrachi.

Epstein served as rabbi of Grozovo from 1898 to 1907, Seiny from 1907 to 1915, and Tartu from 1916 to 1920. While in Tartu, he attended University of Tartu and taught Jewish theology, philosophy, and ethics at the university. He then served as chief rabbi of Libau, Latvia from 1920 to 1923. In the latter year, he immigrated to America and served as rabbi there; he was rabbi of Beth Abraham Congregation in Bayonne, New Jersey in 1923, presiding rabbi of Beth Abraham Congregation in Cleveland, Ohio from 1924 to 1926, chief rabbi of the Orthodox Jewish community of Cincinnati from 1926 to 1928, rabbi of the Beth Sholom Congregation in Brooklyn, New York from 1928 to 1930, and starting in 1930 chief rabbi of the United Orthodox Jewish Community of St. Louis, Missouri.

Like other Eastern European rabbis in America, Epstein had to contend with differences with Reform Jews with regards to Jewish practices like Kashrut. But his reputation as a scholar led other rabbis and lay leaders to come to him for help adjudicate issues related to Jewish law, like two prominent Canadian rabbis who had him serve as a rabbinical judge in a Kashrut dispute between them in 1923. He also wrote several volumes of responsa, including Teshuvah Shelemah, and he wrote a volume for American issues in 1940.

Epstein served as vice-president of the Union of Orthodox Rabbis of the United States and Canada from 1928 to 1930 and its president in 1930. He was also an executive committee member of the Mizrachi Organization of America. In 1896, he married Ethel Neuvidel, daughter of Rabbi Baruch Nathaniel Neuvidel. Their children were Beinush, Joshua J., Sholom H., David Shlomo, Ephraim, Miriam (wife of Gabriel Feigenbaum), and Shulamith.

Epstein died from a heart attack at the Jewish Hospital on July 5, 1942. His funeral was held at Shaare Zedek Synagogue. He was buried in Chesed Shel Emeth Cemetery.
