= Lee Shelton =

19th-century American murderer

- Born: March 16, 1865; Texas, U.S.
- Died: March 11, 1912 (aged 46); Jefferson City, Missouri, U.S.
- Burial place: Greenwood Cemetery (Hillsdale, Missouri)
- Other names: Stagolee, Stagger Lee, Stack-O-Lee, Stag Lee, Lee Sheldon
- Occupations: Pimp, carriage driver
- Known for: "Stagger Lee"
- Criminal charges: Murder (1895); Assault and robbery (1911)
- Criminal penalty: 25 years imprisonment
- Criminal status: Convicted (1897); Paroled (1909); Parole revoked (1911)

Lee Shelton (March 16, 1865 – March 11, 1912), popularly known as "Stagolee", "Stagger Lee", "Stack-O-Lee", and other variations, was an American criminal who became a figure of folklore after murdering Billy Lyons on December 25, 1895. The murder, reportedly motivated partially by the theft of Shelton's Stetson hat, made Shelton an icon of toughness and style in the minds of early folk and blues musicians, and inspired the popular folk song "Stagger Lee". The story endures in the many versions of the song that have circulated since the late 19th century.

== Background ==
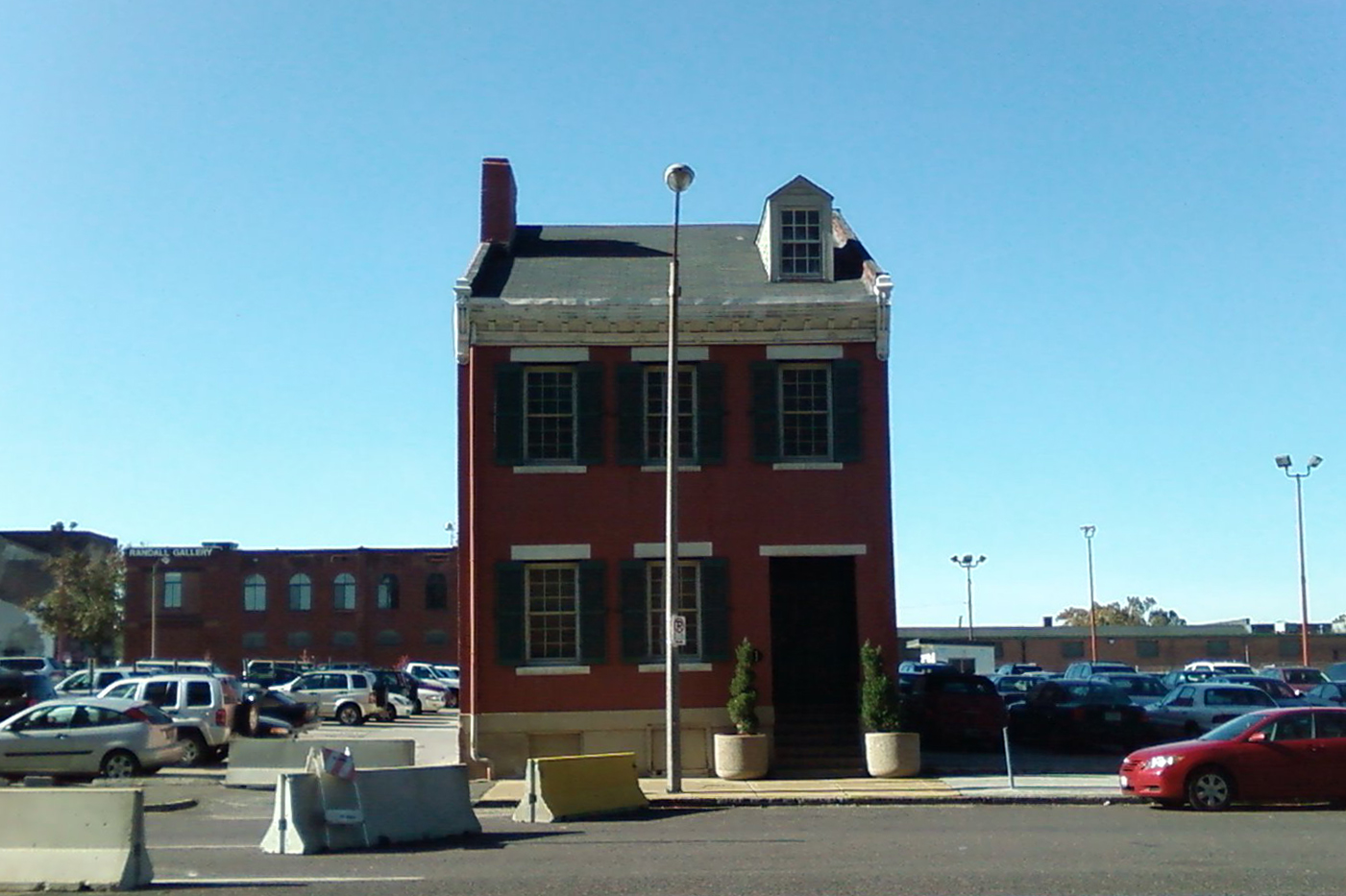
Stagger Lee's "Lid" Club at 911 N. 12th Street, St. Louis (Tucker Blvd. now).

The historical Lee Shelton was an African American man born in 1865 in Texas. He later worked as a carriage driver in St. Louis, Missouri, where he gained a reputation as a pimp and gambler, and evidently served as a captain in a black "Four Hundred Club", a political and social club with a dubious reputation. He was not a common pimp — as described by Cecil Brown, "Lee Shelton belonged to a group of pimps known in St. Louis as the 'Macks.' The Macks were not just 'urban strollers;' they presented themselves as objects to be observed. He was nicknamed "Stag Lee" or "Stack Lee", possibly because he "went stag", meaning he was without friends, or took the nickname from a well-known riverboat captain called "Stack Lee". John and Alan Lomax claimed that the nickname came from a riverboat owned by the Lee family of Memphis called the Stack Lee, which was known for its on-board prostitution. Lee Shelton's nickname was later modified into various other forms in the folk tradition.

On Christmas night in 1895, Shelton shot William "Billy" Lyons in a St. Louis saloon following a dispute. A story appearing in the St. Louis Globe-Democrat in 1895 read:

William Lyons, 25, a levee hand, was shot in the abdomen yesterday evening at 10 o'clock in the saloon of Bill Curtis, at Eleventh and Morgan Streets, by Lee Sheldon [sic], a carriage driver. Lyons and Sheldon were friends and were talking together. Both parties, it seems, had been drinking and were feeling in exuberant spirits. The discussion drifted to politics, and an argument was started, the conclusion of which was that Lyons snatched Sheldon's hat from his head. The latter indignantly demanded its return. Lyons refused, and Sheldon withdrew his revolver and shot Lyons in the abdomen. When his victim fell to the floor Sheldon took his hat from the hand of the wounded man and coolly walked away. He was subsequently arrested and locked up at the Chestnut Street Station. Lyons was taken to the Dispensary, where his wounds were pronounced serious. Lee Sheldon is also known as 'Stag' Lee.

Further details are preserved in trial accounts. For example, Shelton had first crushed Lyons' Derby hat, after which Lyons grabbed Shelton's hat and demanded restitution; Shelton then drew his gun and smacked Lyons on the head with it. Lyons lunged for Shelton and Shelton shot.

Lyons eventually died of his injuries. Shelton was tried and convicted for the crime in 1897, and sentenced to 25 years in prison. He was paroled in 1909, but was imprisoned again two years later for assault and robbery. Unable to get parole, he died in the hospital of the Missouri State Penitentiary in Jefferson City on March 11, 1912, from tuberculosis.

Shelton is buried at the historic Greenwood Cemetery in Hillsdale, Missouri. The Killer Blues Headstone Project raised money to place a stone on his unmarked grave, and on April 14, 2013, a marker was laid during a public ceremony.

== Song and tradition ==
Shortly after the event, the murder became the subject of folk song tradition, known as "Stagolee", "Stagger Lee", and other variants. The first evidence for it is a reference to "Stack-a-Lee" being performed by "Prof. Charlie Lee, the piano thumper" in the Kansas City Leavenworth Herald in 1897. The song was well known in African American communities along the lower Mississippi River by 1910. That year, musicologist John Lomax received a partial transcription of the song, and in 1911 two versions were published in the Journal of American Folklore by the sociologist and historian Howard W. Odum.

The song was first recorded by Waring's Pennsylvanians in 1923, and became a hit. Another version was recorded later that year by Frank Westphal & His Regal Novelty Orchestra, and Herb Wiedoeft and his band recorded the song in 1924. Also in 1924, the first version with lyrics was recorded, as "Skeeg-a-Lee Blues", by Lovie Austin. Ma Rainey recorded the song the following year, with Louis Armstrong on cornet, and a notable version was recorded by Frank Hutchison in 1927.

The song tradition embellishes the story with sometimes inaccurate or fantastic details. The songs play up the importance of Stagolee's Stetson hat as a symbol of manliness. he is often said to have received a death sentence for his crime, which he accepts stoically. Some versions add an additional section in which Stagolee goes to Hell and usurps it from the Devil. The 1995 version by Nick Cave and The Bad Seeds paints Stagger Lee as a sociopathic, bisexual sexual predator who forces a foe to perform fellatio on him before shooting the man to death.

In 2004, The Black Keys included a song on their third album, Rubber Factory, titled "Stack Shot Billy", telling the tale of the infamous murder. Frontman Dan Auerbach drew inspiration from his heavy blues background, playing the song in open G tuning.

== Impact ==
Stagger Lee has become an archetype with some black people who admire the gangster type; a parallel to the glorification of the outlaw by a section of mainstream society. In this variation, he is the embodiment of a tough black man; one who is sly, streetwise, cool, lawless, amoral, potentially violent, and who defies white authority.

Within thirty years of Shelton's death, Benjamin Botkin records stories among the superstitious of his having been born with a caul over his face (signifying one with the power to see spirits and destined for trouble), or of having sold his soul to the Devil (in exchange for the hat, said to be magic, over which he killed Billy Lyons). Additional fantastic legends credit him with the ability to transform himself into animals, of having caused the San Francisco earthquake, and of having fought a duel with Jesse James.

Author and music critic Greil Marcus explicitly ties the Stagger Lee archetype to Sly Stone and his album There's a Riot Goin' On in his book Mystery Train: Images of America in Rock 'n' Roll Music.

From 1982 to 1984, two masked professional wrestlers were billed as Stagger Lee in the Southern US; Sylvester Ritter, better known as Junkyard Dog, played him first in Mid-South Wrestling and James Ware, who became Koko B. Ware, followed suit in the Continental Wrestling Association.

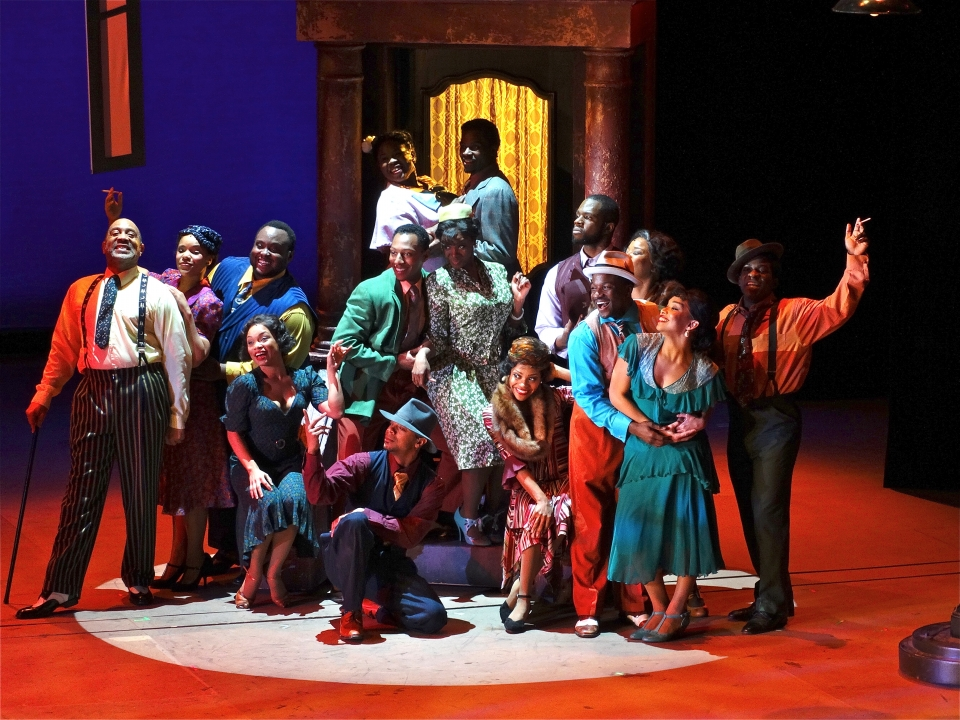
Cast of the Stagger Lee musical, 2016

Dallas Theater Center in Dallas produced an original musical with an adaptation of the folklore around Stagger Lee and Billy Lyons. The characters explore African American history in the Northern United States, and experience racism and violence throughout multiple cities. It opened January 21, 2015 and featured Brandon Gill, J. Bernard Calloway, Tiffany Mann, Cedric Neal, and Saycon Sengbloh.

Damon Runyon references the song in his 1920’s short story "Broadway Financier", where the song is called 'Stacker Lee.'

In 2006, Image Comics published the graphic novel Stagger Lee, written by Derek McCulloch and illustrated by Shepherd Hendrix, examining the historical murder of Lyons by Shelton, and the folklore that came out of it, in the framing setting of a fictionalized version of the African-American community in Saint Louis.

HarperCollins published "A Lush and Seething Hell" by John Horner Jacobs in 2019. Consisting of two novellas, the latter – "My Heart Struck Sorrow" – focuses in large part on a horrific mystery connected to varied acetate recordings made in the 1930s as well as the folklore surrounding "Stagger Lee".

== See also ==
- Frankie and Johnny (song)
