= Sappington Cemetery State Historic Site =

Historic grave yard in Saline County, Missouri

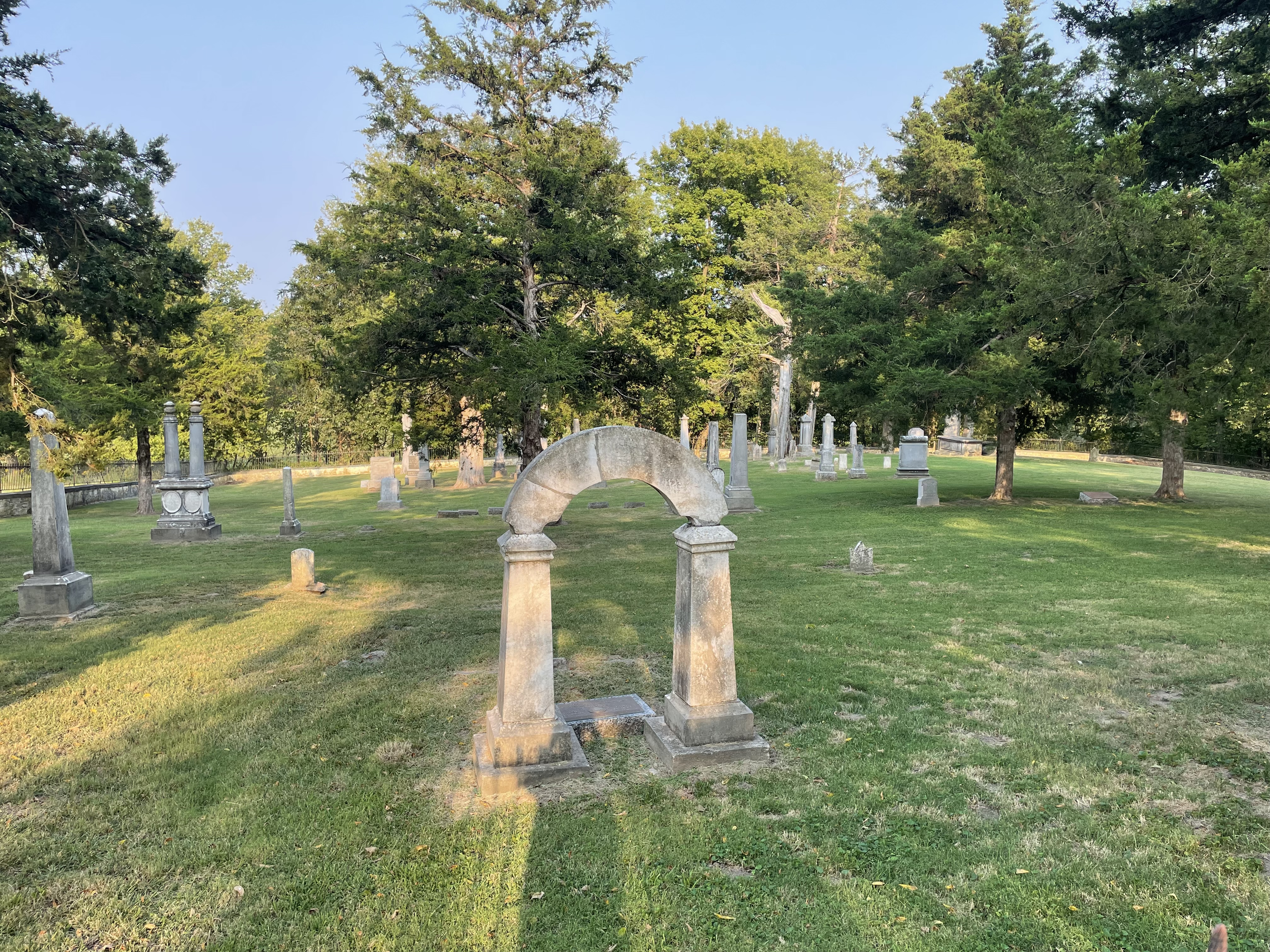

- Location within Missouri Location within the United States
- Location: Saline County, Missouri, United States
- Coordinates: 39°01′58″N 93°00′27″W
- Area: 4.28 acres (1.73 ha)
- Elevation: 666 ft (203 m)
- Established: 1967
- Governing body: Missouri Department of Natural Resources
- Website: Sappington Cemetery State Historic Site

Sappington Cemetery State Historic Site is a historic site located approximately five miles (8.0 km) southwest of Arrow Rock in Saline County, Missouri, United States. The cemetery houses the graves of John Sappington and two of his sons-in-law, Meredith Miles Marmaduke and Claiborne Fox Jackson, who each served as governor of Missouri before the American Civil War.

John Sappington (1776–1856) was a prominent early physician and businessman in Missouri. He was a proponent of using quinine in the treatment of malaria and was at the time the largest importer of the drug in the United States. Sappington also wrote the first medical book published west of the Mississippi River.

Sappington and his family were deeply involved in antebellum Missouri Democratic politics. Two of his sons-in-law, Meredith Miles Marmaduke and Claiborne Fox Jackson, were elected as governors of Missouri. Grandson John Sappington Marmaduke was a noted Confederate General in the American Civil War; he also was elected as Missouri Governor in later years.

Established by Sappington in 1831, the two-acre cemetery holds 111 headstones and grave markers. Sappington Cemetery became a part of the Missouri State Park system in 1967 by act of the Missouri General Assembly. In order to preserve its historic nature and appearance, the site has not been modified for ADA accessibility. No restrooms or other facilities are provided. The site is open sunrise to sunset year-round.

== Sappington African American Cemetery State Historic Site ==
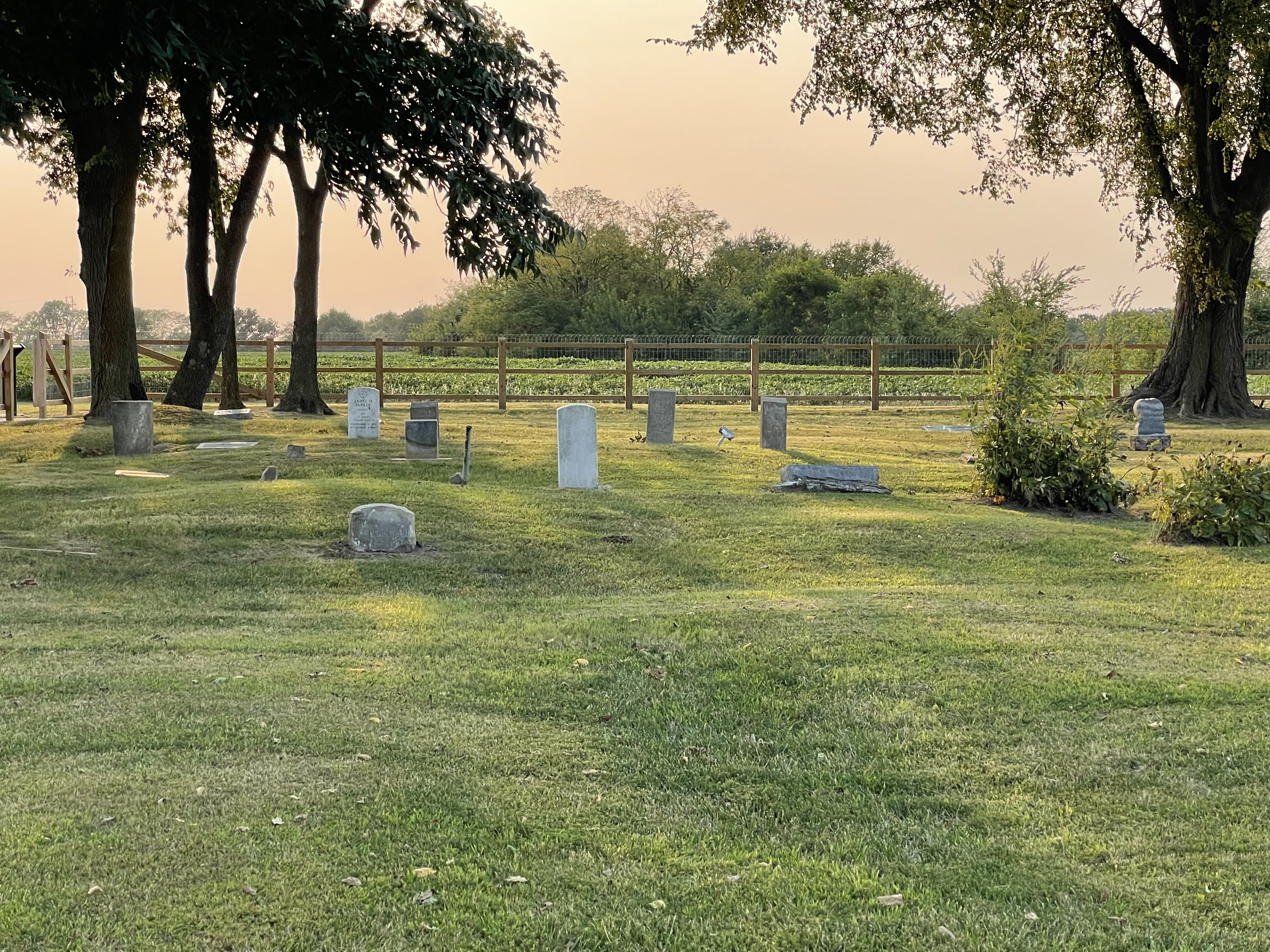
Sappington Negro Cemetery

The state historic site was expanded in 2014 to include the nearby "Sappington Negro Cemetery," used initially for the burial of the family's enslaved African Americans before the war. Renamed the "Sappington African American Cemetery," it has been recognized as a separate state historic site since 2021.

== See also ==
- List of cemeteries in Missouri
