= Moses Dickson =

American abolitionist (1824–1901)

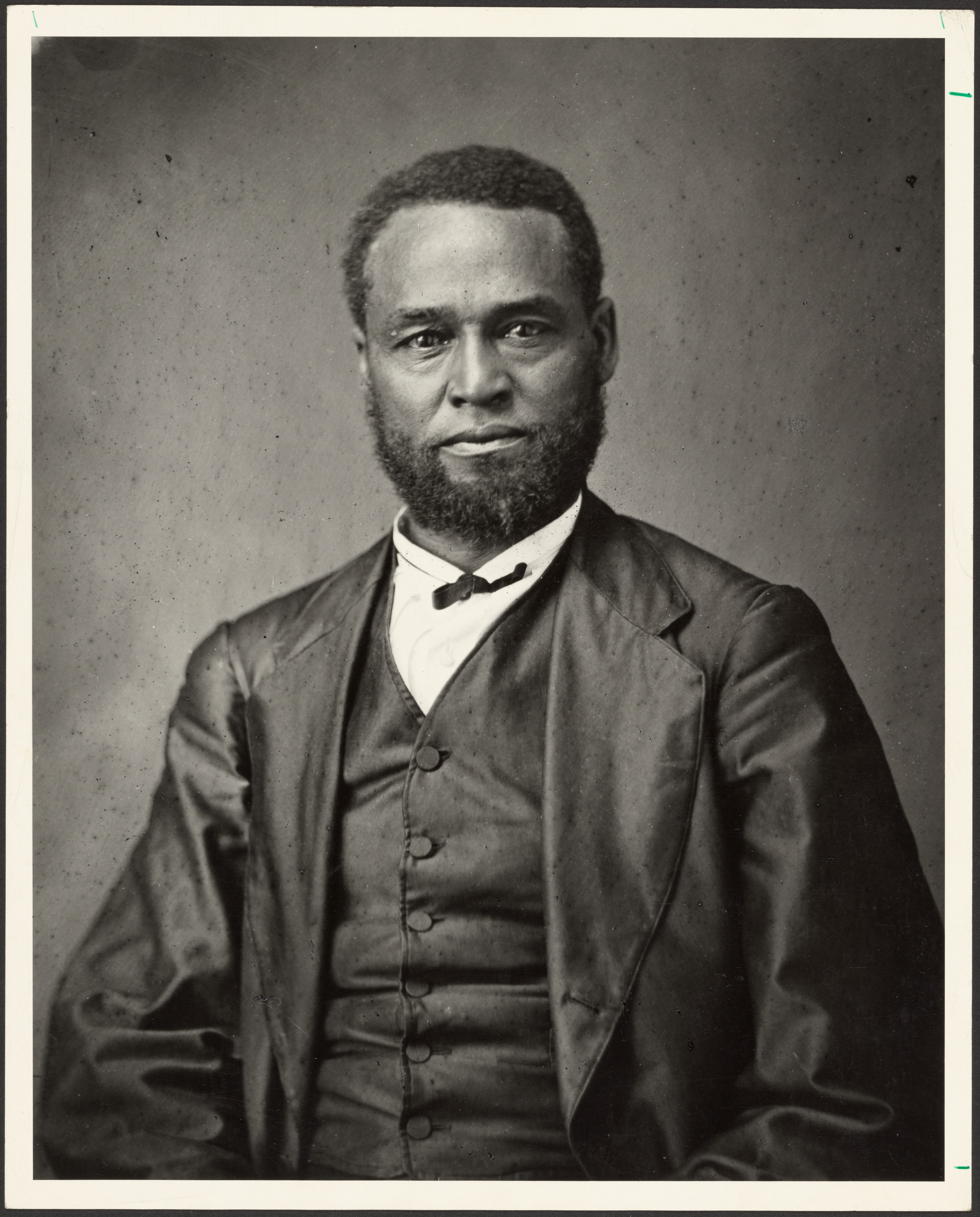
- Born: April 5, 1824
- Died: November 28, 1901 (aged 77)
- Occupations: barber, soldier, and minister
- Known for: abolitionist, and organizer
- Spouse: Mary E. Dickson (married 1848–1891)
- Children: Mamie Augusta

Moses Dickson (1824–1901) was an abolitionist, soldier, minister, and founder of the Knights of Liberty, an anti-slavery organization that planned a slave uprising in the United States and helped Black-American enslaved people to freedom through the Underground Railroad. He also founded the black fraternal organization The International Order of Twelve Knights and Daughters of Tabor and was a co-founder of Lincoln University in Missouri. Moses Dickson was also active in Prince Hall Freemasonry.

== Early life ==
Moses Dickson was born free in Cincinnati, Ohio, on April 5, 1824. His father, Robert, died when he was eight, and his mother, Hannah, died when he was fourteen. He had five sisters and three brothers. As a youth, he trained as a barber. At age sixteen, he began a three-year tour of the South, working as an itinerant barber on steamships. What he witnessed in his travels convinced him to work for the abolition of slavery.

== Knights of Liberty and slave uprising ==
On August 12, 1846, Dickson and eleven other young men met in the second story of an old brick house on Green St. and Seventh St. (whose name was later changed to Lucas Avenue) in St. Louis, Missouri, to create a plan to end slavery in the United States. They formed a secret organization known as the Knights of Liberty which planned to initiate a national insurrection against slavery. Dickson declared "it was determined to organize the slaves throughout the south, drill them, and in ten years from that time strike for freedom" during an interview with the Denver Post, reprinted in the Minneapolis Journal, on July 4, 1901. The men took an oath of secrecy: "I can die, but I cannot reveal the name of any member until the slaves are free."

At the end of ten years, these twelve men had grown to a network of resistance that included 42,000 men across every southern state except Texas and Mississippi, according to Dickson. These armed men met secretly at night and drilled for the uprising. "Plans were complete for a rising," Dickson told the Denver Post reporter, "a concentration of the forces was ordered at Atlanta, GA. We expected to have nearly 200,000 men when we reached Atlanta." In July, 1857, the men were ready to march. Dickson's orders to them were to "spare women and children," parole non-combatants, treat prisoners well, and capture all ammunitions. "March, fight and conquer, or leave their bodies on the battlefield." he said.

A day was set for the national insurrection but before the time came it had become apparent to the leaders that the relationship between the North and South was becoming so strained that it was decided to postpone the uprising. Civil War was about to break out. Dickson decided "a higher power" was at work, and told the Knights of Liberty to "wait, have patience, hold together, not break ranks, trust in the Lord."

Having changed his mind about the uprising, Dickson spoke to the abolitionist John Brown at Davenport just before Brown's raid on Harpers Ferry with 16 black men on October 16, 1859. and tried to dissuade him, telling him it was too early. But Brown went ahead anyway.

== Underground Railroad ==
Beginning in 1850, the network created by the Knights of Liberty was also used in the Underground Railroad to help escaped slaves to freedom. A smaller secret organization, the Order of Twelve, was created in Galena, Illinois, which used St. Louis as its headquarters and aided hundreds of slaves to freedom. Dickson raised funds for the Railroad and also directly arranged individual escape plans.

"Strange as it may seem, he told the Denver Post reporter, "some of our most generous supporters were slave owners. They did not approve of the system but they had inherited slaves and treated them so well they had no desire to run away. They had nothing to fear from the railroad." One of these men, he said, was General Cassius Clay of Kentucky who gave him $1,000 for the railroad. Contributions also came from England, from people who knew of the Knights and worked with them. When the Civil War broke out, "there was a shipload of arms and ammunition in Mobile harbor and another in Galveston harbor, sent to us by Englishmen" Dickson said.

Dickson also tells of watching a mother and daughter being sold on the auction block in New Orleans and then arranging for their escape by having them "stolen," dressing them as boys, and getting them hired onto a steamer upriver and finally to freedom in Canada. Another man was helped to escape by putting him into a wooden box and shipping him out of Charleston, SC. After his escape to the north, the man called himself Henry "Box" Brown, attended Harvard University, and published a memoir, A Life in Slavery and Freedom.

== Civil war and Reconstruction ==
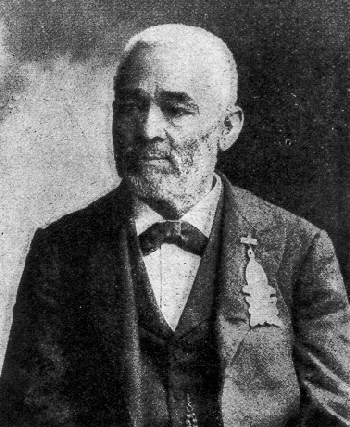
Moses Dickson as an older man

During the Civil War, the Knights disbanded and many of their members, including Dickson, joined the Union Army. With the end of the Civil War, Dickson began to focus on education and economic development among the freed people. He joined the African Methodist Episcopalian church in 1866 and became an ordained minister the following year. In 1869, Dickson became Grand Master of Grand Lodge of Missouri, Prince Hall Freemasonry. He also was highly involved in the Heroines of Jericho, an auxiliary group open to Black woman to the Holy Royal Arch Masons, publishing a ritual handbook for the Heroines in 1895. He started schools for black children and lobbied to obtain black teachers for black children. With other returning black Union soldiers, he was one of the co-founders of the "Lincoln Institute" (later Lincoln University) in Jefferson City, Missouri, as well as a founding member of the Missouri Equal Rights League. In 1879–1880, Rev. Dickson served as President of the Refugee Relief Board which provided aid and support to the approximately 16,000 African Americans from the South who ended up in St. Louis on their way to Kansas and other states as part of the Exoduster movement.

In memory of the original twelve Knights of Liberty, in 1872 Dickson and his wife Mary Elizabeth Butcher Peters created the International Order of Twelve of Knights and Daughters of Tabor, an African American fraternal organization. The new organization promoted African American advancement through "Christian demeanor," the acquisition of property and wealth, morality, temperance, education, and "man's responsibility to the Supreme Being." This organization, more commonly known as the Order of Twelve, accepted males and females on equal terms. Men and women gathered together in higher level groups and in the governing bodies of the organization, although at the local level the men held their meetings in "temples" and the women in "tabernacles" (similar to "lodges" in Freemasonry). This organization was most active in the South and the lower Midwest. Like many fraternal orders of the time, members received a burial policy and weekly cash payments for the sick.

== Personal life ==
Dickson married Mary Elizabeth Butcher Peters at Galena, Illinois on October 5, 1848. They had one daughter, Mamie Augusta. Mary Elizabeth worked in the Underground Railroad, traveled with her husband on abolitionist speaking tours across the country, was co-founder of The Order of Twelve, and a "faithful and zealous worker" in the AME Church. She was known as Mother Dickson, while her husband was referred to as Father Dickson. Their marriage was described as an equal partnership. Mary Elisabeth died in 1891 and has been cited as an early female pioneer of black philanthropy.

== Death ==
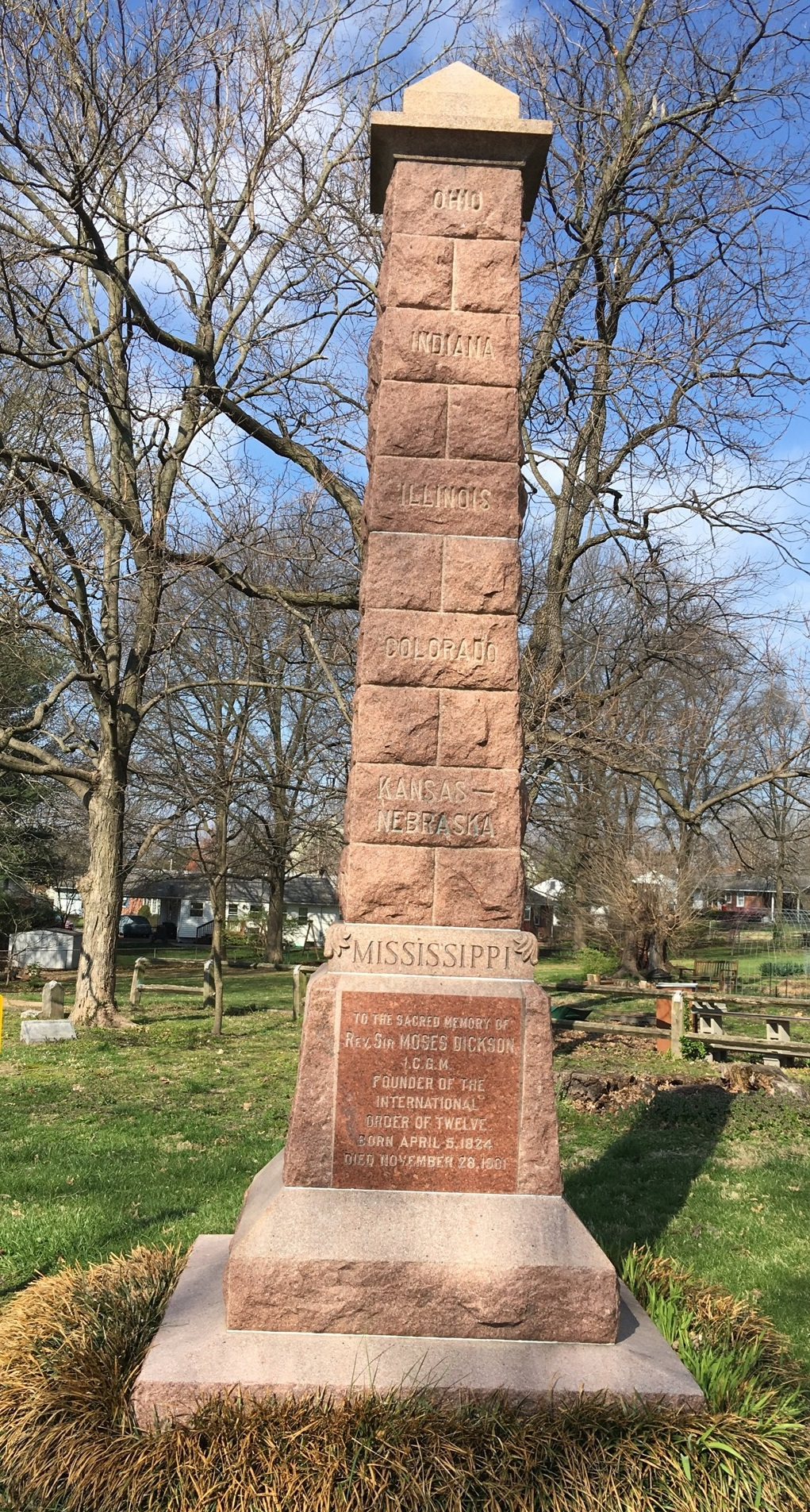
Photo of Rev. Moses Dickson Monument taken in Father Dickson Cemetery, located at 845 Sappington Rd, Crestwood, Mo.

The Revered Moses Dickson died of typhoid fever on November 28, 1901. His funeral at St. Paul's AME Church in St. Louis was attended by thousands of people from all over the United States. He is buried at the Father Dickson Cemetery in Crestwood, Missouri.

== See also ==
- List of African-American abolitionists
