= New Hope Primitive Baptist Church =

Historic church in Ray County, Missouri, US

- U.S. National Register of Historic Places
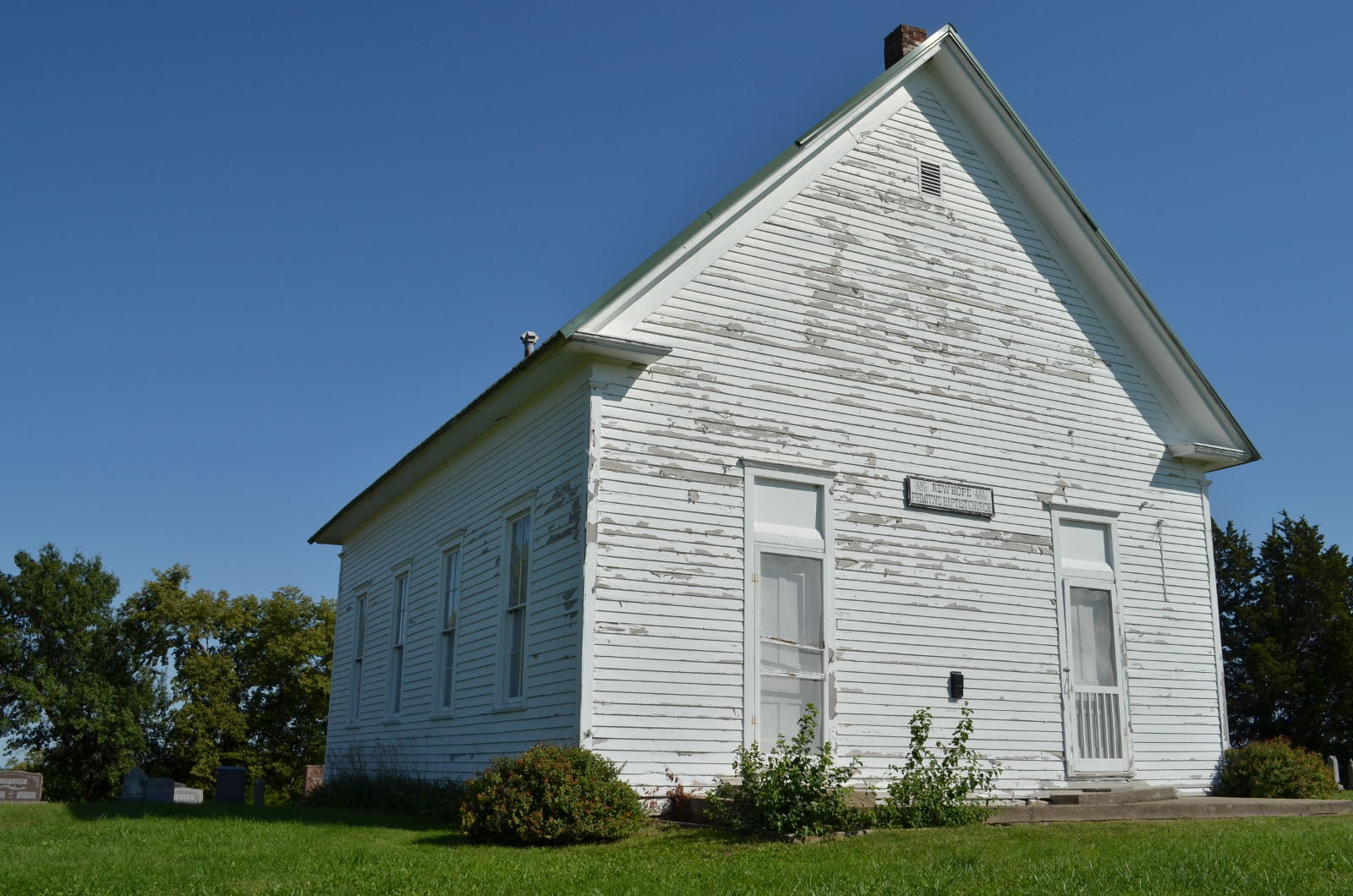

- Location within Missouri Location within the United States
- Location: Southwest of Richmond on Old Orrick Rd., near Richmond, Missouri
- Coordinates: 39°14′59″N 94°02′36″W
- Area: 1.8 acres (0.73 ha)
- Built: 1897
- Architectural style: Greek Revival
- NRHP reference No.: 80002393
- Added to NRHP: November 14, 1980

New Hope Primitive Baptist Church, also known as New Hope Church, is a historic Primitive Baptist church located near Richmond, Ray County, Missouri. The church was established c. 1820 as North Bluffton and the building was constructed in 1897. It is a one-story, rectangular, vernacular Greek Revival style frame building. It measures 30 feet by 40 feet and has a high gable roof. Adjacent to the church is a contributing cemetery containing 166 graves dating from 1856 to 1973.

It was listed on the National Register of Historic Places in 1980.
