= Cape County Memorial Park Cemetery =

Cemetery in Missouri, United States

Coordinates: 37°20′35″N 89°35′42″W

The Cape County Memorial Park Cemetery, or also referred to as the Cape County Memorial Cemetery, is a 34 acres (140,000 m^{2}) perpetual care park-cemetery located at 2315 US 61 North between Cape Girardeau, Missouri and Jackson, Missouri. It was established in 1932 by Hugo Felix, a Kansas City businessman who paid for the cemetery's creation and sponsored its centerpiece, a 57-foot (17 m) tall monument named the Tower of Memories. The cemetery is owned by the Ford and Sons Funeral Home Inc., and it contains the burials of over 14,400 people, mostly Cape Girardeau citizens.

== History ==
in 1932, Hugo Felix purchased 30 acres of land for $3,000 outside of Cape Girardeau that was at the time, part of the county farm. Felix's centerpiece monument was built in 1934. Named the Tower of Memories, it is constructed of local limestone and features a Celesta-Vox, an amplified chime system known as "The Voice from the Heavens" and can be heard from miles away. The property was purchased by the Ford family in 1986. The area is regulated by the State of Missouri, and the perpetual care is handled by the state. There are a number of large mausoleums located throughout the cemetery. The cemetery includes citizens of all professions as well as veterans of numerous wars including, World War I, World War II, the Korean War, the Vietnam War, Gulf War, and the war on terror.

== Notable burials ==
- John Gilbert Sieck (1921–1943) - United States Navy Reserve killed in action
- Lindsay William Simmons (1898–1981) - Businessman
- Paul Raymond Williams (1988–1935) - Physician
- Karole Kaye Stevenson (1941–2001) - Off-Broadway star (1960s–1970s)
- Richard Gene Wilson (1931–1950) - Medal of Honor recipient (United States Army), Korean War veteran
- Rush Hudson Limbaugh Jr. (1918–1990) - United States Army Air Corps, father of radio talk show host Rush Limbaugh
- Russell Isaac Boyt (1909–1992) - United States Army, awarded Silver Star and Purple Heart
- Timothy J. Ruopp (1953–1984) - Minister, police officer killed in line of duty
