= Greenwood Cemetery (Hillsdale, Missouri) =

Historic African American cemetery in St. Louis County, Missouri

- U.S. National Register of Historic Places
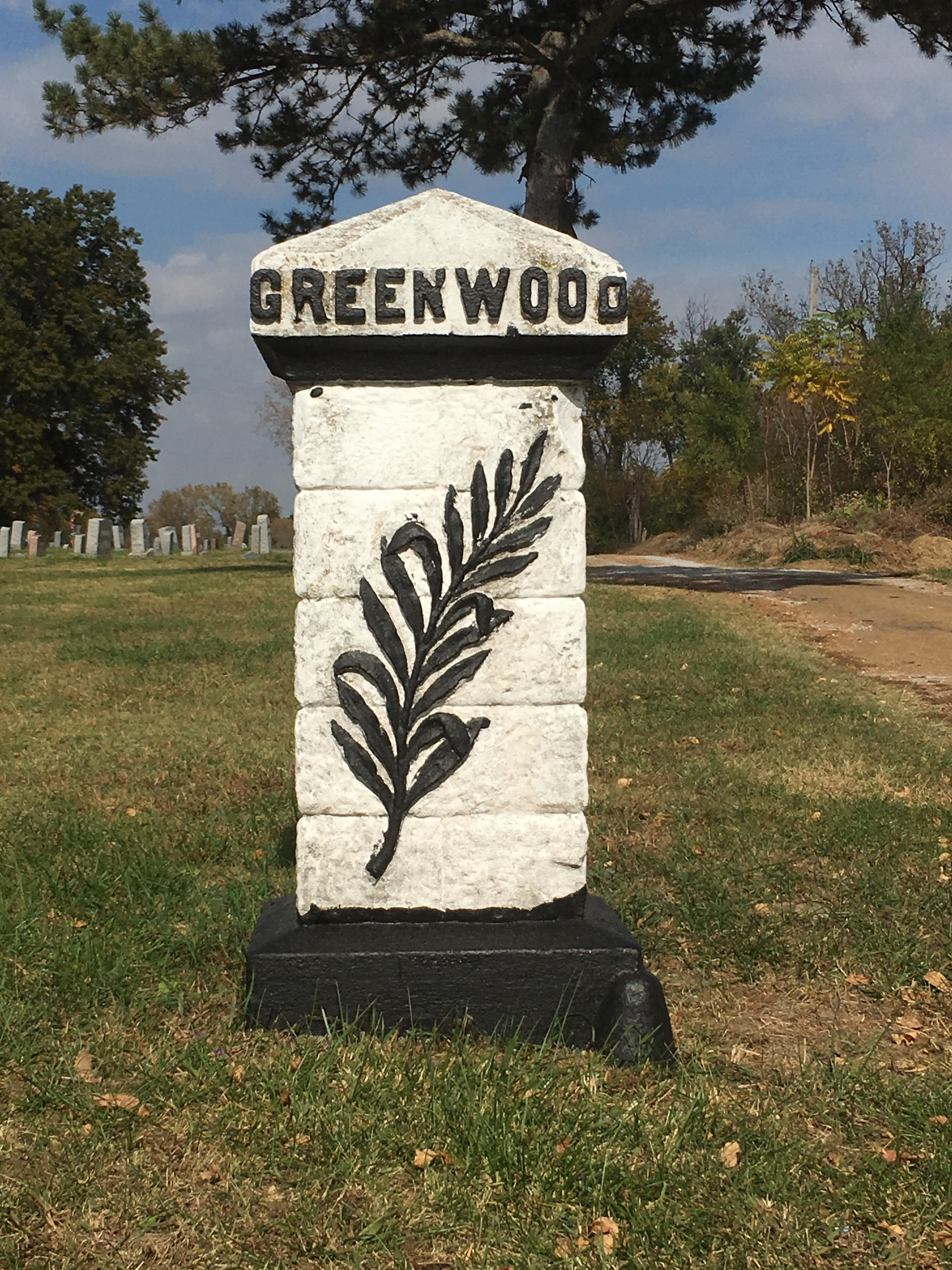
- Entrance to Greenwood Cemetery

- Location within St. Louis Location within Missouri Location within the United States
- Location: 6571 St. Louis Ave., Hillsdale, Missouri
- Coordinates: 38°41′19″N 90°17′19″W
- Area: 31.75 acres (12.85 ha)
- Built: 1874
- Architect: Herman Krueger
- NRHP reference No.: 04000090
- Added to NRHP: February 24, 2004

Greenwood Cemetery is a historic cemetery established in 1874, and located at 6571 St. Louis Avenue in Hillsdale, Missouri. This was the first non-denominational commercial cemetery for African-Americans in the St. Louis area.

It was listed on the National Register of Historic Places on February 24, 2004, and the Underground Railroad Network to Freedom in 2024.

== History ==
Greenwood Cemetery was established in 1874 by Herman Krueger, it has approximately 6,000 marked graves but is thought to contain up to 50,000 burials.

In 1890, the cemetery was sold to Krueger's son-in-law, Adolph Foelsch; the Foelsch family owned and operated the cemetery, including manufacturing concrete tombstones, until 1981. Those buried at Greenwood include former enslaved people, war veterans, members of fraternal organizations, artists, laborers and middle class African-Americans, as well as a number of famous and prominent African-Americans from St. Louis.

Many of the people buried at Greenwood were originally from southern states and had participated in the Great Migration north. Funerals were numerous in Greenwood in the mid-twentieth century, but with desegregation, the cemetery saw a decline in use. In the 1980s it began to go derelict. It permanently closed in the 1990s and continued to stand abandoned for most of a decade. In 1999, the nonprofit group Friends of Greenwood Cemetery, Inc. was formed for the purpose of restoring and preserving the site as a historic park. Eventually the group gained ownership of the cemetery.

Volunteers from the Greenwood Cemetery Preservation Association have worked to maintain the grounds and preserve African American history.

Other nearby historic African American cemetery include the Washington Park Cemetery (1920), Father Dickson Cemetery (1903), and Quinette Cemetery (1866).

== Notable interments ==
- Walter Davis (1910–1963), blues musician
- Lucy A. Delaney (1830–1910), activist, writer, and seamstress
- Grant Green (1935–1979), jazz musician
- Mary Johnson (1898 or 1900–1983), classic female blues singer, accordionist and songwriter
- Harriet Robinson Scott (1815–1876), wife of Dred Scott
- Lee Shelton (1865–1912; also known as "Stagger" Lee), American folk figure
- Charlton Tandy (1836–1919), public official, civil rights activist, lawyer, newspaper publisher

== See also ==
- National Register of Historic Places listings in St. Louis County, Missouri
