= Horine Cemetery =

Cemetery in Richwoods, Missouri

- Interactive map of Horine Cemetery

Details
- Location: Richwoods, Missouri, U.S.
- Coordinates: 38.1544°N 90.8217°W
- Find a Grave: Horine Cemetery

Horine Cemetery is located in Richwoods, Missouri, the first burial noted was in 1851.

== Oldest graves ==
The first noted burial in Horine was an Augustine Godat who was born February 10, 1763, and died June 25, 1851, having reached the age of 91 years old, He was born in Heufchatel, Switzerland. The first Horine buried here was a Benjamin Horine he was born October 25, 1780, and died July 8, 1852, he was married to a Catherine Shook.
