= Washington Park Cemetery =

Historic African American cemetery in Berkeley, Missouri

- Interactive map of Washington Park Cemetery

Details
- Established: 1920
- Closed: 1980
- Location: 4650 James S. McDonnell Boulevard, Berkeley, Missouri, 63134
- Country: United States
- Find a Grave: Washington Park Cemetery

Washington Park Cemetery is a historic African-American cemetery active from 1920 until 1980 and located in Berkeley, Missouri, a suburb of St. Louis, Missouri. Large-scale disinterment occurred over several decades for various construction projects. As of 2022, local cleanup efforts continue due to its long-term state of disrepair.

== History ==
Washington Park Cemetery was founded in 1920 by businessmen Andrew Henry Watson and Joseph John Hauer as a for-profit, perpetual-care burial site for African Americans, eventually becoming the largest African-American cemetery in the St. Louis region at the time. Whites opposed the construction of the cemetery and though Watson and Hauer were supportive of segregationist notions regarding land rights, equal interment, and use of public parks, they defended the rights of black visitors to picnic on the grounds. As a result, they were the subject of criticism for, “disrupting bucolic country land with the presence of black St. Louisans.”

Beginning in the latter half of the 20th century, the cemetery was impacted by three construction projects. In the late 1950s, 75 acres were claimed for Interstate 70, which bisected the cemetery's property and paved over graves. In 1972, an expansion to the St. Louis Lambert International Airport claimed nine acres. In 1992, an expansion to St. Louis's light rail system, MetroLink, claimed more land. Across these three projects, an estimated 11,974 to 13,600 bodies were disinterred and relocated, resulting in some families losing track of their ancestral graves.

== Restoration ==
The cemetery ceased business operations in the late 1980s. Local activists and media have highlighted the cemetery for its management, disrepair, and for billboards placed in the cemetery's grounds. In August 2020, those billboards were removed from the cemetery after a lawsuit settlement between billboard company, DDI Media, and area resident Wanda Brandon's activist group, the Washington Park Cemetery Anti-Desecration League.

News reports in 2019 stated that the city of Berkeley would be purchasing the cemetery in 2019 for $30. Restoration efforts at the cemetery by various volunteer groups are ongoing, in hopes of turning this into a heritage site. As of December 2022, the city's website states that the cemetery remains in private hands. Another news report, in March 2022, stated that the cemetery is in a trust held by St. Louis County because of unpaid taxes.

Other nearby historic African American cemeteries include the Greenwood Cemetery (1874), Father Dickson Cemetery (1903), and Quinette Cemetery (1866).

== Notable burials ==
- Ira L. Cooper (c.1878–1939), police detective
- Miles Dewey Davis Jr. (1898–1962), dentist
- Jessie Housley Holliman (1905–1984), educator and artist
- Joseph E. Mitchell (1876–1952) and William Mitchell (1896–1945), newspapermen
- Charles Hubbard Thompson (1891–1964), ragtime pianist and composer
- George L. Vaughn (1885–1950), attorney
- Frank Lunsford Williams (1864–1953) educator

== See also ==
- List of cemeteries in the United States
