= Meredith Marmaduke =

American politician (1791–1864)

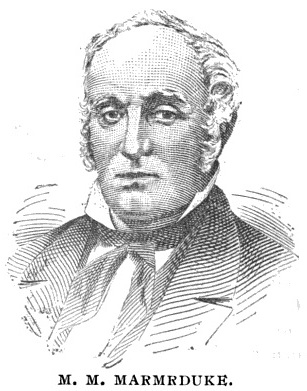

8th Governor of Missouri
- In office February 9, 1844 – November 20, 1844
- Lieutenant: Vacant
- Preceded by: Thomas Reynolds
- Succeeded by: John C. Edwards

6th Lieutenant Governor of Missouri
- In office November 16, 1840 – February 9, 1844
- Governor: Thomas Reynolds
- Preceded by: Franklin Cannon
- Succeeded by: James Young

Personal details
- Born: Meredith Miles Marmaduke; August 28, 1791 Westmoreland County, Virginia, US
- Died: March 26, 1864 (aged 72) Saline County, Missouri, US
- Resting place: Sappington Cemetery, Saline County, Missouri; 39.032778°N 93.0075°W
- Party: Democratic
- Spouse: Lavinia Sappington (m. 1826)
- Children: Seven sons, three daughters
- Profession: Farmer, tradesman, merchant

Military service
- Allegiance: United States
- Branch/service: United States Volunteers
- Years of service: 1812–1815
- Rank: Colonel
- Battles/wars: War of 1812

Meredith Miles Marmaduke (August 28, 1791 – March 26, 1864) was an American politician who served as the eighth governor of Missouri in 1844, to fill out the term of Governor Thomas Reynolds, who had committed suicide. A member of the Democratic Party, he had been elected and served as the 6th lieutenant governor.

Marmaduke had a large family. He had married Lavinia Sappington, a daughter of John Sappington, a pioneering medical doctor in Saline County, Missouri, and his wife Jane, sister of a Kentucky governor. The two men were affiliated in Sappington's business for a time, working with traders on the Santa Fe Trail. Marmaduke later acquired and operated a successful plantation in Saline County, becoming a large slaveholder as well. He and his wife reared their ten children here.

Four of Marmaduke's sons served the Confederacy during the American Civil War, and two died. His son John Sappington Marmaduke was promoted during the American Civil War to become a senior officer of the Confederate States Army.

== Early life ==
Meredith Miles Marmaduke was born in Westmoreland County, Virginia, on August 28, 1791, to Vincent and Sarah (Porter) Marmaduke. He was educated in a local boys' seminary and worked as a civil engineer until his career was interrupted by the War of 1812. During the war, although only twenty-two years old, Marmaduke was commissioned as colonel of the regiment that was raised in his county. He or his father may have paid to outfit the regiment, which was often the basis of such commissions.

Returning to Virginia after the war, Marmaduke was appointed as United States Marshal for the Tidewater district of the state by President James Madison. He served for several years in that office until being elected clerk of the circuit court .

In 1823, he migrated to Franklin, Missouri, for his health. Marmaduke held a variety of jobs, including store clerking, managing a large farm, and working as a trader on the Santa Fe Trail, which became increasingly busy with traders and emigrants to western lands.

In 1826, Marmaduke married Lavinia Sappington, the daughter of Dr. John and Jane Sappington. Her father became a prominent pioneer physician of Saline County, who was later known for his development of a patent medicine, a quinine pill used to treat malaria and other fevers. He manufactured "fever pills" that incorporated quinine and sold them, eventually nationally. They were also distributed through trade on the Santa Fe Trail. For a brief time, Marmaduke became a partner in his father-in-law's family enterprises, which included stores in Jonesborough (now Napton) and Arrow Rock, Missouri. He worked for a period with his father-in-law and his brother-in-law Erasmus Sappington, and Marmaduke earned a good income from their business together.

While serving as surveyor for Saline County, Marmaduke platted the village of Arrow Rock in 1829. By around 1835, Marmaduke had acquired a large plantation not far from Arrow Rock, where he and his wife Lavinia raised their ten children. A successful planter, he held numerous enslaved African Americans as workers on the plantation. Saline County is within the region known as "Little Dixie", which was settled by numerous migrants from the Upper South, who developed plantations and held slaves in higher numbers than in most areas of the state.

== Political career ==
Marmaduke was a Jacksonian Democrat and a friend and supporter of Missouri Senator Thomas Hart Benton, whom he met through his father-in-law Sappington. Marmaduke served as Saline County surveyor and county judge before being elected Lieutenant Governor of Missouri in 1840. His time in that role was relatively uneventful. But on February 9, 1844, Governor Thomas Reynolds committed suicide.

Marmaduke assumed office as governor, acting in what was considered a largely caretaker role for the final ten months of the governor's two-year term. But Marmaduke encouraged better treatment by the state of the mentally ill. In one of his final messages to the state legislature, he strongly urged the establishment of what was then known as a "lunatic asylum," to house and treat those with mental illness. Marmaduke was a slaveholder and benefited from the institution. He refused to pardon three abolitionists who had helped refugee slaves. Angered by his refusal, Democratic leaders bypassed Marmaduke as their candidate in the 1844 gubernatorial election and chose John C. Edwards, who won the office.

Marmaduke continued to be active in politics, serving as Saline County delegate to the Missouri Constitutional Convention. He ran unsuccessfully for governor again in 1848. In 1854, he was appointed as president of the State Agricultural Society and of the district fair association. This group organized the first State Fair in Missouri.

== American Civil War ==
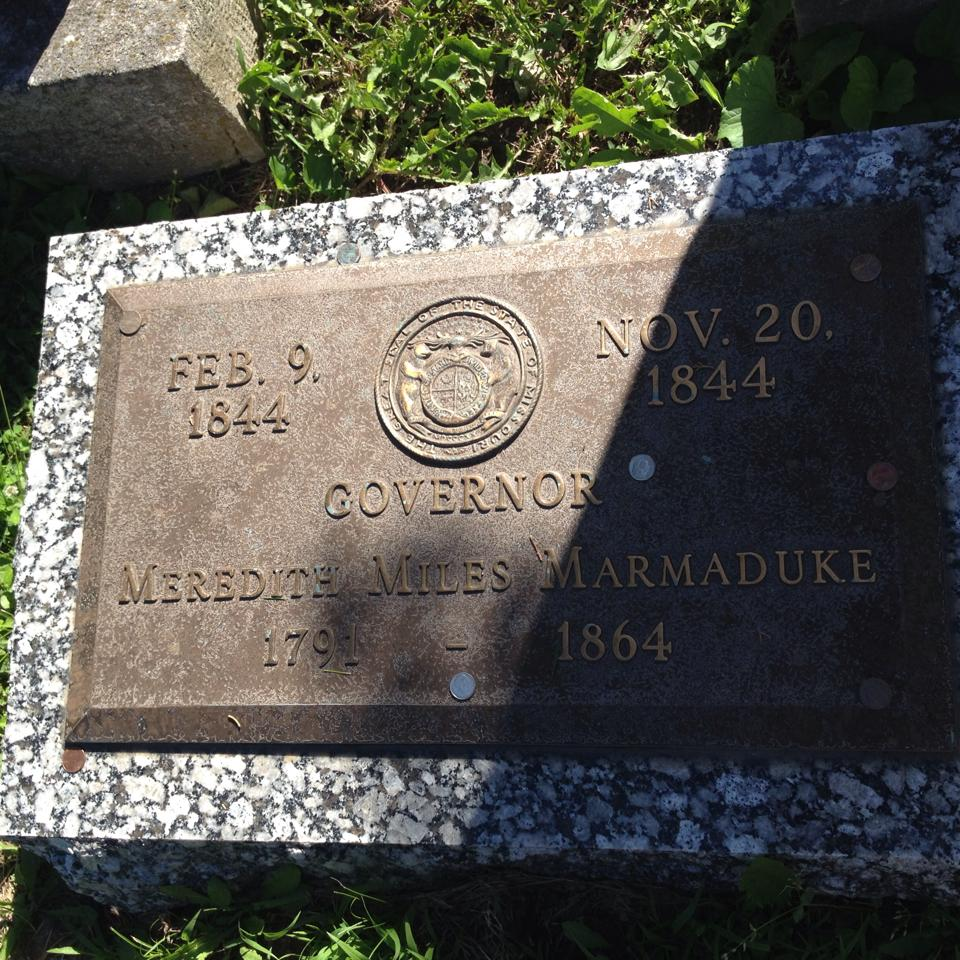
Marmaduke's marker at Sappington Cemetery in Saline County, Missouri

Even before the first shots were fired at Fort Sumter, Marmaduke found himself at odds with friends and family. Much like his friend Senator Benton, Marmaduke's views on slavery had begun to change in the late 1840s. As a result, Marmaduke became estranged from his father-in-law Dr. Sappington, and brother-in-law Claiborne Fox Jackson, who supported secession.

Jackson had successively married three Sappington daughters; Jane died of illness a few months after their marriage, and Louisa in 1838, likely of complications from childbirth, as her infant died, too. Jackson married Elizabeth Sappington, known as Eliza, that year. He was also in business with his and Marmaduke's father-in-law in his patent medicines. Jackson became involved in Democratic Party politics, serving 12 years in the State House, and was elected as Governor of Missouri in 1860, serving into 1861.

Once the war began, Marmaduke was a fierce Union supporter, but his in-laws supported the Confederacy. (Jackson was deposed from the governorship by the legislature during the first year of the war, and Union forces occupied much of the state.)

Going against their father's wishes, four of Marmaduke's sons would fight for the South during the Civil War. Two of them died in the war. Son Henry Hungerford Marmaduke served as a gunner in the Confederate Navy aboard the ironclad CSS Virginia in its historic clash with the USS Monitor.

Son John Sappington Marmaduke, was promoted to the rank of general in the Confederate States Army. He survived the war and, after the Reconstruction era, was active in Democratic Party politics. He was elected in 1884 as Missouri's 25th governor (serving 1885–1887).

== Death ==
Marmaduke did not live to see the end of the Civil War. He died at his home on March 26, 1864. Despite his differences with his in-laws, his wife Lavinia, a Sappington daughter, ensured that he was buried at her father's family Sappington Cemetery, in Saline County, Missouri. His brother-in-law Claiborne Jackson also died during the war, while in Little Rock, Arkansas, and was buried there. After the war, his family arranged to have his remains exhumed, and he was reinterred at the Sappington Cemetery.

Since 1967, the cemetery has been preserved as a State Historic Site as part of a program to recognize burial places of governors. Recognizing contributions of the many enslaved African Americans he held, Dr. Sappington had established separate land for their use as a burial ground. It became known as "Sappington Negro Cemetery." In 2014 the Sappington Cemetery State Historic Site was enlarged by authorization of the legislature to include this historic cemetery, located about one-quarter mile from the original family plot.

== See also ==
- List of governors of Missouri

Political offices
Preceded by Franklin Cannon	Lieutenant Governor of Missouri; 1840–1844	Succeeded by James Young
Preceded by Thomas Reynolds	Governor of Missouri; 1844	Succeeded by John C. Edwards
