= Hillsdale, Missouri =

- Village
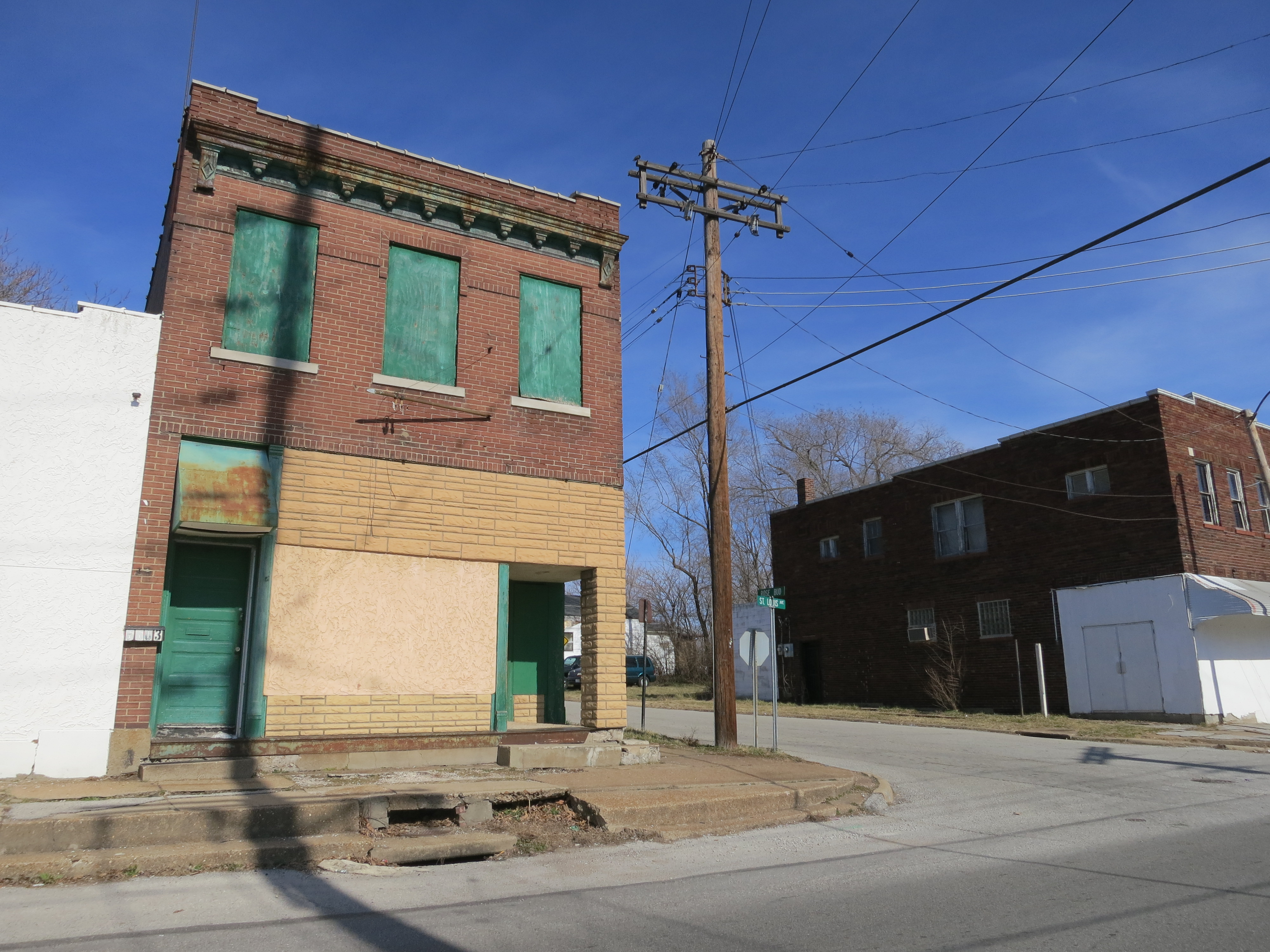
- St. Louis Avenue and Rosebud Avenue, Hillsdale, Missouri, February 2013

- Location of Hillsdale, Missouri
- Coordinates: 38°41′09″N 90°17′13″W
- Country: United States
- State: Missouri
- County: St. Louis
- Township: University

Area
  - Total: 0.34 sq mi (0.89 km^{2})
  - Land: 0.34 sq mi (0.89 km^{2})
  - Water: 0 sq mi (0.00 km^{2})
- Elevation: 604 ft (184 m)

Population (2020)
  - Total: 1,216
  - Density: 3,550.4/sq mi (1,370.81/km^{2})
- Time zone: UTC-6 (Central (CST))
  - Summer (DST): UTC-5 (CDT)
- ZIP codes: 63121, 63133
- Area code(s): 314/557
- FIPS code: 29-32266
- GNIS feature ID: 2398509

Hillsdale is a village in St. Louis County, Missouri, United States. Greenwood Cemetery is located in Hillsdale. The population was 1,216 at the 2020 census.

== Geography ==
According to the United States Census Bureau, the village has a total area of 0.35 square miles (0.91 km^{2}), all land.

== Demographics ==
Historical population
| Census | Pop. | Note | %± |
|---|---|---|---|
| 1950 | 2,902 | | — |
| 1960 | 2,788 | | −3.9% |
| 1970 | 2,599 | | −6.8% |
| 1980 | 2,247 | | −13.5% |
| 1990 | 1,948 | | −13.3% |
| 2000 | 1,477 | | −24.2% |
| 2010 | 1,478 | | 0.1% |
| 2020 | 1,216 | | −17.7% |
U.S. Decennial Census

=== 2020 census ===
Hillsdale, Missouri – Racial and ethnic composition Note: the US Census treats Hispanic/Latino as an ethnic category. This table excludes Latinos from the racial categories and assigns them to a separate category. Hispanics/Latinos may be of any race.
| Race / Ethnicity (NH = Non-Hispanic) | Pop 2000 | Pop 2010 | Pop 2020 | % 2000 | % 2010 | % 2020 |
|---|---|---|---|---|---|---|
| White alone (NH) | 57 | 31 | 23 | 3.86% | 2.10% | 1.89% |
| Black or African American alone (NH) | 1,408 | 1,403 | 1,130 | 95.33% | 94.93% | 92.93% |
| Native American or Alaska Native alone (NH) | 2 | 2 | 5 | 0.14% | 0.14% | 0.41% |
| Asian alone (NH) | 1 | 0 | 1 | 0.07% | 0.00% | 0.08% |
| Native Hawaiian or Pacific Islander alone (NH) | 0 | 0 | 0 | 0.00% | 0.00% | 0.00% |
| Other race alone (NH) | 1 | 0 | 6 | 0.07% | 0.00% | 0.49% |
| Mixed race or Multiracial (NH) | 6 | 25 | 33 | 0.41% | 1.69% | 2.71% |
| Hispanic or Latino (any race) | 2 | 17 | 18 | 0.14% | 1.15% | 1.48% |
| Total | 1,477 | 1,478 | 1,216 | 100.00% | 100.00% | 100.00% |

=== 2010 census ===
As of the census of 2010, there were 1,478 people, 487 households, and 346 families living in the village. The population density was 4,222.9 inhabitants per square mile (1,630.5/km^{2}). There were 696 housing units at an average density of 1,988.6 per square mile (767.8/km^{2}). The racial makeup of the village was 2.2% White, 95.9% African American, 0.1% Native American, and 1.7% from two or more races. Hispanic or Latino of any race were 1.2% of the population.

There were 487 households, of which 46.2% had children under the age of 18 living with them, 18.3% were married couples living together, 42.7% had a female householder with no husband present, 10.1% had a male householder with no wife present, and 29.0% were non-families. 24.2% of all households were made up of individuals, and 6.2% had someone living alone who was 65 years of age or older. The average household size was 3.03 and the average family size was 3.64.

The median age in the village was 27.4 years. 35.5% of residents were under the age of 18; 11.7% were between the ages of 18 and 24; 23.4% were from 25 to 44; 22.3% were from 45 to 64; and 7.2% were 65 years of age or older. The gender makeup of the village was 44.7% male and 55.3% female.

=== 2000 census ===
As of the census of 2000, there were 1,477 people, 529 households, and 368 families living in the village. The population density was 4,226.3 inhabitants per square mile (1,631.8/km^{2}). There were 645 housing units at an average density of 1,845.6 per square mile (712.6/km^{2}). The racial makeup of the village was 3.86% White, 95.40% African American, 0.14% Native American, 0.07% Asian, 0.14% from other races, and 0.41% from two or more races. Hispanic or Latino of any race were 0.14% of the population.

There were 529 households, out of which 34.6% had children under the age of 18 living with them, 21.2% were married couples living together, 40.1% had a female householder with no husband present, and 30.4% were non-families. 26.5% of all households were made up of individuals, and 7.6% had someone living alone who was 65 years of age or older. The average household size was 2.79 and the average family size was 3.39.

In the village, the population was spread out, with 33.0% under the age of 18, 11.0% from 18 to 24, 26.9% from 25 to 44, 20.7% from 45 to 64, and 8.3% who were 65 years of age or older. The median age was 30 years. For every 100 females, there were 81.7 males. For every 100 females age 18 and over, there were 73.8 males.

The median income for a household in the village was $22,159, and the median income for a family was $23,500. Males had a median income of $24,327 versus $23,594 for females. The per capita income for the village was $9,776. About 27.3% of families and 30.7% of the population were below the poverty line, including 39.5% of those under age 18 and 20.2% of those age 65 or over.

== Police Department ==
The Hillsdale Police Department is responsible for law enforcement services in the village. The Hillsdale PD has a fleet of 3 Ford Police Interceptor Sedans, 1 Chevrolet Caprice, 1 Chevrolet Impala and 1 Ford Expedition. Hillsdale PD is dispatched by St. Louis County's 2nd Precinct Dispatch. Hillsdale officers can frequently be seen on calls along with those from Velda City.

== Education ==
It is in the Normandy Schools Collaborative (formerly Normandy School District) school district. The comprehensive high school of the district is Normandy High School.

Formerly a portion of Hillsdale was in the Wellston School District. In 2010 the district closed and merged into the Normandy School District.

McKinley Elementary School, of the Normandy district, had a Hillsdale postal address but was in Velda City. Lucas Crossing Elementary School, scheduled to open in 2001, took students formerly at McKinley Elementary.
