= Quinette Cemetery =

Historic cemetery in St. Louis County, Missouri

Coordinates: 38°34′07″N 90°26′05″W

Details
- Established: 1866; 159 years ago
- Location: 12188 Old Big Bend Road, Kirkwood, St. Louis County, Missouri, U.S.
- Find a Grave: Quinette Cemetery

Quinette Cemetery is a historic landmark and African-American burial ground located in Kirkwood, Missouri, a suburb of the city of St. Louis.

== History ==
The Quinette Cemetery was established in 1866, originally associated with the Olive Chapel African Methodist Episcopal Church in Kirkwood. In 2002, the cemetery was deeded to the city of Kirkwood. The cemetery is roughly 2.7 acres in size and has 25 marked graves, it is believed that some 150 to 200 people are buried here. The earliest known grave dates back to 1853.

The cemetery is the burial site of African-American American Civil War soldiers, formally enslaved people, as well as World War II veterans. It is also regarded as the oldest African American Cemetery West of the Mississippi River.

Other nearby historic African American cemeteries include Washington Park Cemetery (1920), Father Dickson Cemetery (1903) and Greenwood Cemetery (1874).

== See also ==
- List of cemeteries in the United States
