= Old Greenville, Missouri =

- Old Greenville (23WE637)
- U.S. National Register of Historic Places
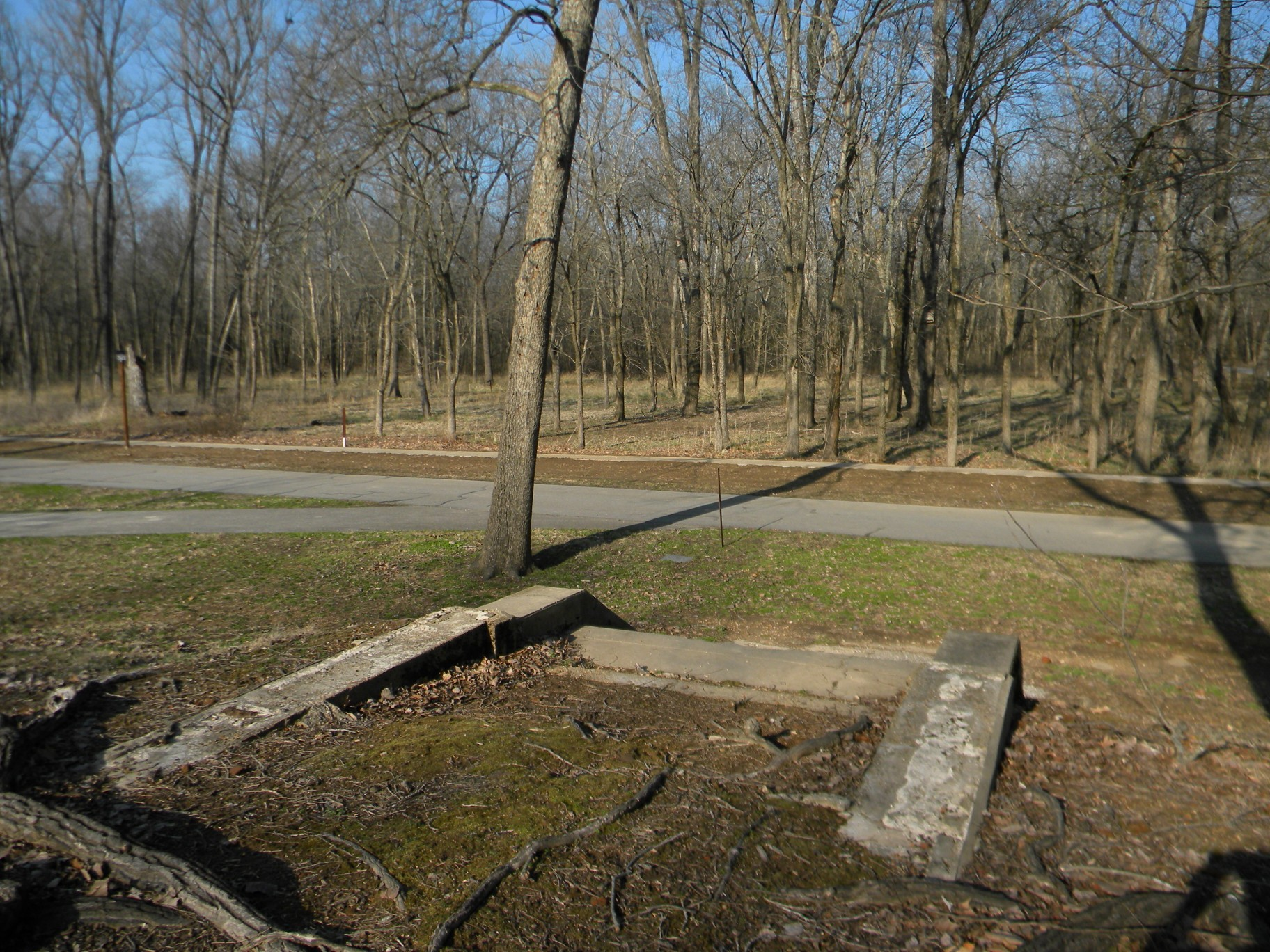
- Nearest city: Greenville, Missouri
- Area: 181 acres (73 ha)
- NRHP reference No.: 90000005
- Added to NRHP: February 17, 1990

Old Greenville, near Greenville, Missouri, is a historic site that is listed on the National Register of Historic Places.

It is the former site of the town of Greenville, which was moved when it was believed the town would be flooded by a dam project in the 1940s. Buildings were moved; foundations remain behind.

It is the site of a campground now, and it also includes the Old Greenville Cemetery where suffragist Alice Curtice Moyer is buried.

== See also ==
- List of cemeteries in Missouri
- National Register of Historic Places listings in Missouri
