= University Township, St. Louis County, Missouri =

Township in the US state of Missouri

Coordinates: 38°40′27″N 90°19′17″W

University Township is a township in St. Louis County, in the U.S. state of Missouri. Its population was 34,281 as of the 2010 census.

== Demographics ==
University Township, St. Louis County, Missouri – Racial and ethnic composition Note: the US Census treats Hispanic/Latino as an ethnic category. This table excludes Latinos from the racial categories and assigns them to a separate category. Hispanics/Latinos may be of any race.
Race / Ethnicity (NH = Non-Hispanic)	Pop 2000	Pop 2010	Pop 2020	% 2000	% 2010	% 2020
White alone (NH)	9,615	8,937	8,811	30.58%	26.07%	28.45%
Black or African American alone (NH)	20,373	23,208	19,101	64.79%	67.70%	61.68%
Native American or Alaska Native alone (NH)	53	60	38	0.19%	0.18%	0.12%
Asian alone (NH)	483	526	625	1.54%	1.53%	2.02%
Native Hawaiian or Pacific Islander alone (NH)	5	2	7	0.02%	0.01%	0.02%
Other race alone (NH)	61	61	247	0.19%	0.18%	0.80%
Mixed race or Multiracial (NH)	477	779	1,126	1.52%	2.27%	3.64%
Hispanic or Latino (any race)	379	708	1,014	1.21%	2.07%	3.27%
Total	31,446	34,281	30,969	100.00%	100.00%	100.00%
