= John Walker (Missouri politician) =

American politician (1770–1838)

State Treasurer of Missouri
- In office 1833–1838
- Preceded by: James Earickson
- Succeeded by: Abraham McClellan

Personal details
- Born: October 15, 1770 Brunswick County, Virginia, US
- Died: May 26, 1838 (aged 67)
- Party: Democratic Party
- Relations: George Walker (brother); David Walker (brother); James D. Walker (nephew); David S. Walker (nephew); Richard K. Call (nephew)
- Children: John George Walker

John Walker (October 15, 1770 – May 26, 1838) was an American politician. He served as the State Treasurer of Missouri from 1833 to 1838.

== Biography ==
John Walker was born on October 15, 1770, in Brunswick County, Virginia. He later moved to Kentucky, then eventually settled in Howard County, Missouri in 1818. His wife Sarah Caffery, whom he married in 1800, was a niece of Rachel Jackson, the wife of Andrew Jackson. Walker was a member of a prominent Kentucky political family, and was the brother of U.S. Senator George Walker and U.S. Congressman David Walker, and the uncle of James D. Walker, David S. Walker and Richard K. Call. His son, John George Walker, served as a Confederate general during the American Civil War.

Walker was a Democrat. A decade after moving to Missouri, he was elected to the Missouri Senate, representing Howard County. He was elected as State Treasurer of Missouri in 1833. According to legend, he never kept the Treasurer's office locked or bolted, but secured government funds in an iron-bound oaken chest, and reportedly slept on top of the chest at night. Following his death in office on May 26, 1838, aged 67, $400 (~$11,619 in 2024) in government funds were reported missing. Nonetheless, he was exonerated by the Missouri General Assembly on charges of misappropriation of funds, and his estate was paid compensation for his service as state treasurer. Several years later, the missing money was discovered in between the metal lining and walls of the chest.

Political offices
Preceded by James Earickson	State Treasurer of Missouri; 1833–1838	Succeeded by Abraham McClellan
