= David Walker (Kentucky politician) =

American politician (1763–1820)

Member of the U.S. House of Representatives from Kentucky's 6th district
- In office March 4, 1817 – March 1, 1820
- Preceded by: Solomon P. Sharp
- Succeeded by: Francis Johnson

Personal details
- Born: David Walker; April 13, 1763 Brunswick County, Virginia, U.S.
- Died: March 1, 1820 (aged 56) Washington, D.C., U.S.
- Party: Democratic-Republican Party

David Walker (April 13, 1763 – March 1, 1820) was a U.S. representative from Kentucky, brother of George Walker and John Walker and grandfather of James D. Walker. He was the father of Florida governor David S. Walker and the uncle of another Florida governor Richard Keith Call. Walker played a pivotal role in the upbringing of his nephew, taking in Call's widowed mother (Walker's sister) and her children after the death of Call's father.

Born in Brunswick County, Virginia, Walker attended public and private schools. He served in the Revolutionary War as a private under General Lafayette and was at the surrender of Cornwallis at Yorktown. He moved to Logan County, Kentucky. He served as clerk of county and circuit courts. He served as member of the State house of representatives from 1793 to 1796, and an unsuccessful candidate for Congress in the 1st congressional district in 1803 and 1806. He served as major on the staff of Governor Isaac Shelby of Kentucky in the Battle of the Thames during the War of 1812.

Walker was elected as a Democratic-Republican to the Fifteenth and to the succeeding Congress (March 4, 1817 – March 1, 1820). He died on March 1, 1820, in Washington, D.C., and was interred in the Congressional Cemetery.

== See also ==
- List of members of the United States Congress who died in office (1790–1899)

U.S. House of Representatives
Preceded by Solomon P. Sharp	Member of the U.S. House of Representatives from Kentucky's 6th congressional district 1817 – 1820	Succeeded by Francis Johnson
