= George Walker (Kentucky politician) =

U.S. Senator from Kentucky (1763–1819)

United States Senator from Kentucky
- In office August 30, 1814 – February 2, 1815
- Preceded by: George M. Bibb
- Succeeded by: William T. Barry

Member of the Kentucky Senate
- In office 1810-1814

Personal details
- Born: 1763 Culpeper County, Virginia
- Died: August 19, 1819 (aged 55–56) Nicholasville, Kentucky
- Party: Democratic-Republican

George Walker (1763 – August 19, 1819) was a U.S. Senator from Kentucky.

Born in Culpeper County, Virginia, Walker attended the common schools and served in the American Revolutionary War. He moved to Jessamine County, Kentucky, in 1794 and studied law. He was admitted to the bar and commenced practice in Nicholasville, Kentucky, in 1799. He served as a commissioner of the Kentucky River Company in 1801.

Walker was a member of the Kentucky State Senate from 1810 to 1814. He was then appointed to the United States Senate to fill the vacancy caused by the resignation of George M. Bibb, and served from August 30, 1814, to February 2, 1815, when a successor was elected. He died in Nicholasville in 1819, and was interred on his estate near there.

George Walker was the brother of David Walker and John Walker and the great-uncle of James D. Walker. He was also the uncle of two governors of Florida, Richard Keith Call and David Shelby Walker. Another nephew John George Walker served as a general in the Confederate Army during the Civil War.

== Sources ==
- United States Congress. "George Walker (id: W000053)". Biographical Directory of the United States Congress.

U.S. Senate
Preceded by George M. Bibb	U.S. senator (Class 2) from Kentucky; 1814–1815; Served alongside: Jesse Bledsoe	Succeeded by William T. Barry
