= Abraham McClellan =

Abraham McClellan may refer to:

- Abraham McClellan (Missouri politician), State Treasurer of Missouri and Jackson County Judge
- Abraham McClellan (Tennessee politician), United States Congress representative for Tennessee
