= Benjamin F. Rice =

American politician (1828–1905)

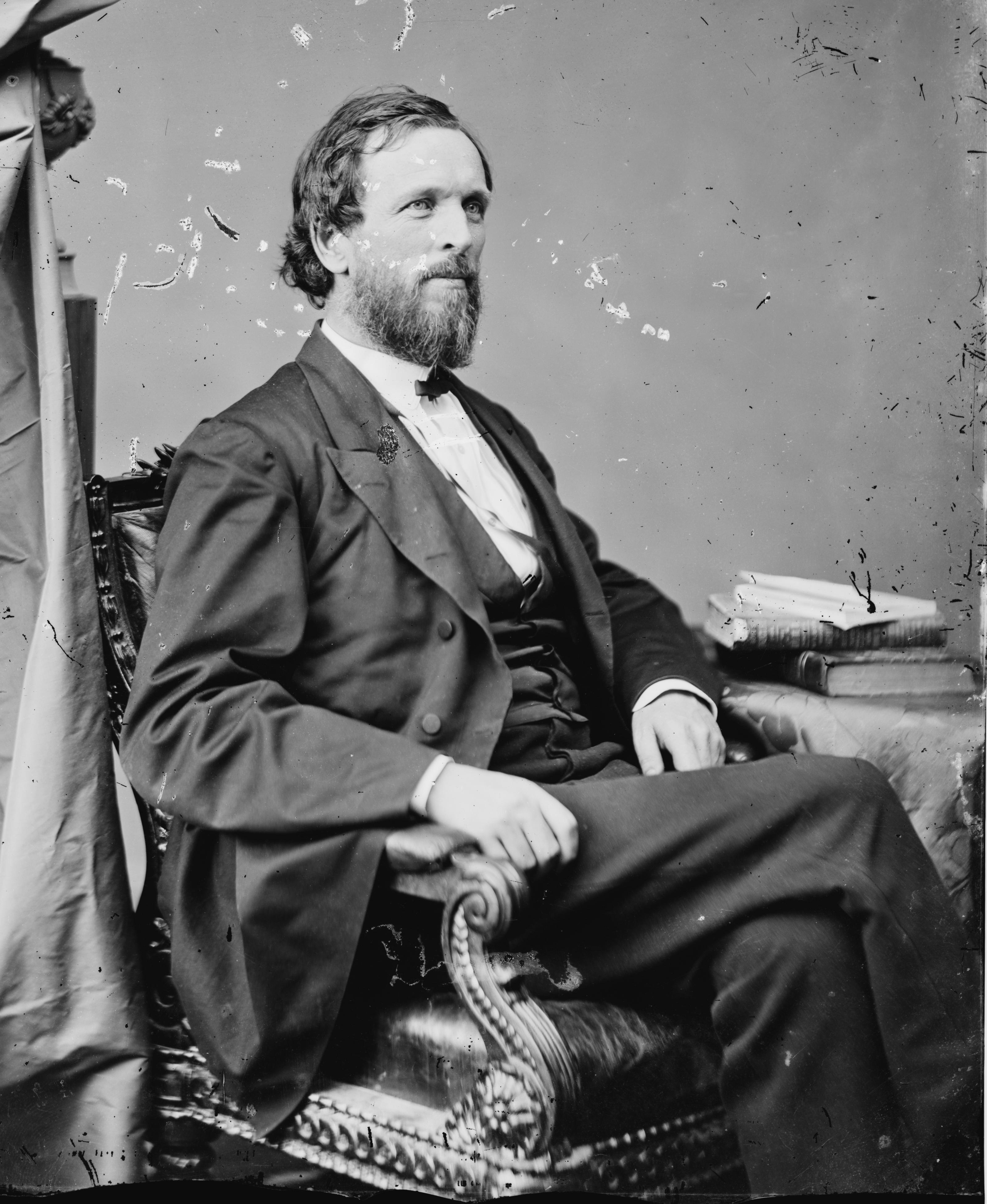

United States Senator from Arkansas
- In office June 23, 1868 – March 3, 1873
- Preceded by: Charles B. Mitchel
- Succeeded by: Stephen Wallace Dorsey

Member of the Kentucky House of Representatives from Estill County
- In office August 6, 1855 – August 3, 1857
- Preceded by: Lewis M. Wilson
- Succeeded by: Oliver Crawford

Personal details
- Born: Benjamin Franklin Rice; May 26, 1828 East Otto, New York, U.S.
- Died: January 19, 1905 (aged 76) Tulsa, Oklahoma, U.S.
- Resting place: Oak Hill Cemetery; Washington, D.C., U.S.
- Party: Republican
- Spouse: Nancy Jane Riddell
- Occupation: Lawyer

Benjamin Franklin Rice (May 26, 1828 – January 19, 1905) was a Republican politician from Arkansas, among several states, who represented that state in the United States Senate during the Reconstruction years from 1868 to 1873.

== Biography ==
Rice was born in East Otto in Cattaraugus County in southwestern New York. After private schooling, Rice studied law, and upon his admission to the bar, began practicing in Irvine, Estill County, Kentucky. From 1855 to 1856, he served as a member of the Kentucky House of Representatives. In 1856, he served as a presidential elector for the Republican ticket pledged to John C. Fremont. Two years later, he married Nancy Jane "Nannie" Riddell. In 1860, they relocated to Minnesota, and Rice soon joined the Union Army as a captain during the American Civil War. Eventually, he gained promotion to the rank of major and was a judge advocate with the 3rd Minnesota Volunteer Infantry Regiment.

In 1864, Rice settled in the capital city of Little Rock, Arkansas, where he resumed his law practice. He was active in organizing the Arkansas Republican Party and was appointed chair of a committee that, in 1868, prepared the state's code of practice. Upon the readmission of Arkansas to the Union, Rice was elected by the Arkansas General Assembly to the Senate. At one point, he held the chairmanship of the Committee on Mines and Mining, now the Committee on Energy and Natural Resources.

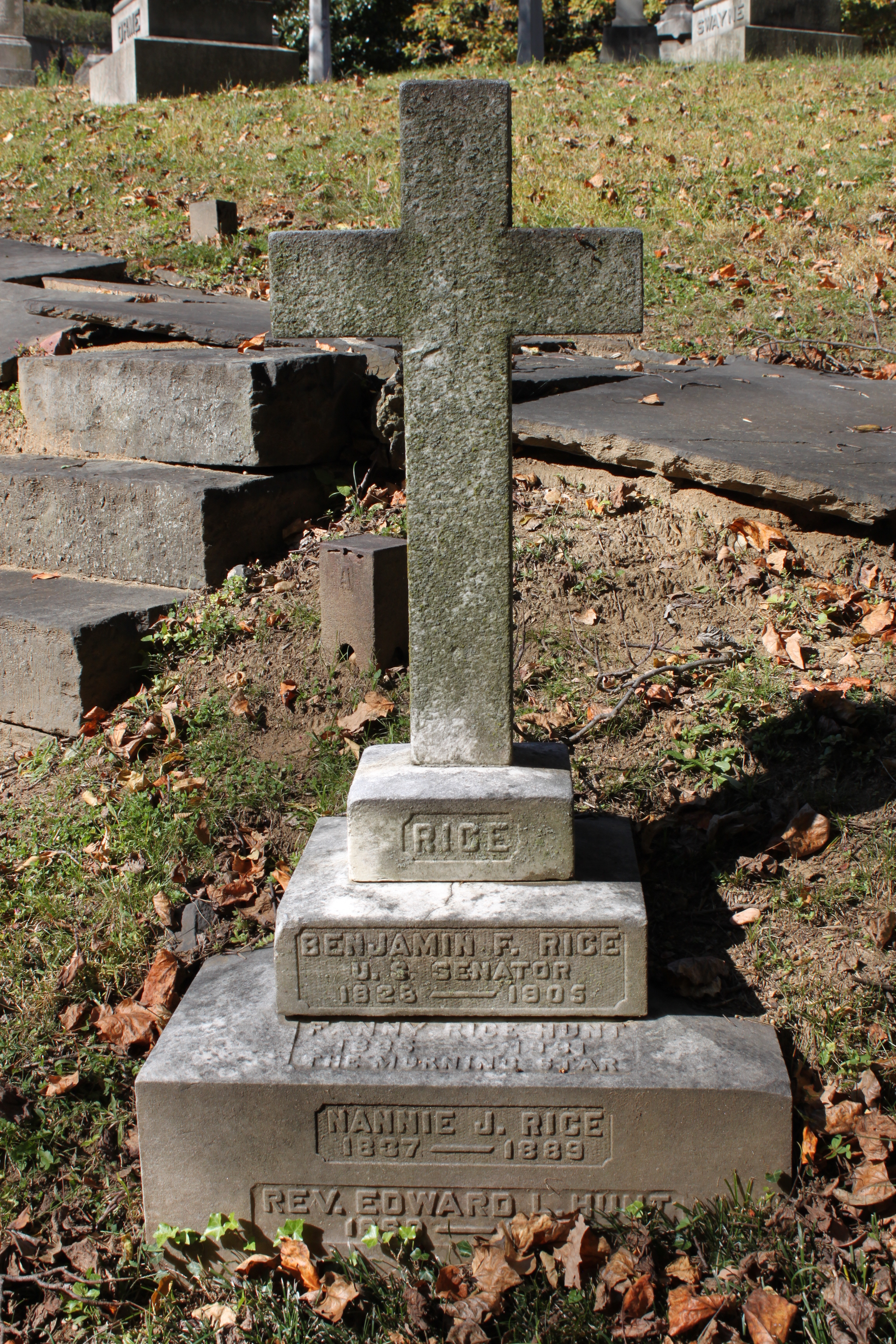
Grave of Rice at Oak Hill Cemetery

On returning home, Rice resumed his law practice. In 1875, he moved to Colorado for health reasons. He then returned to Washington, D.C. in 1882, where he continued his law practice until his death. He died in Tulsa, Oklahoma, and is interred there at Oak Hill Cemetery in Washington, D.C.

U.S. Senate
Preceded by Vacant^{1} (American Civil War)	U.S. senator (Class 3) from Arkansas; June 23, 1868 – March 3, 1873; Served alongside: Alexander McDonald	Succeeded by Stephen Wallace Dorsey
Notes and references
1. Because of Arkansas' secession from the Union, the seat remained vacant from 1861 to 1868 when Charles B. Mitchel was expelled from the Senate.
