= Abraham McClellan (Missouri politician) =

American politician (1776–1851)

State Treasurer of Missouri
- In office 1838–1843
- Preceded by: John Walker
- Succeeded by: Peter Garland Glover

Personal details
- Born: November 1, 1776 Virginia, US
- Died: September 18, 1851 (aged 74)
- Occupation: Politician

Abraham McClellan (November 1, 1776 – September 18, 1851) was an American politician. He served as State Treasurer of Missouri from 1838 to 1841.

== Biography ==
McClellan was born on November 1, 1776, in Virginia, later moving to Jackson County, Missouri. His home there, a 1.5-story log cabin, was the second house built in Fort Osage Township. A Democrat, he was one of three inaugural judges of Jackson County appointed by Governor John Miller; when he began serving as judge, on May 21, 1827, the court was situated inside of a house in Independence. He was appointed as State Treasurer of Missouri on June 6, 1838, to fill the unexpired term of John Walker, who died in office. As treasurer, he was paid $1,250 per year, as well as given a bond of $100,000. The Missouri State Capitol was in the midst of being rebuilt during the first half of his tenure, so it is unknown if he occupied the Capitol when construction was completed in 1840. Reappointed twice more, his tenure ceased in 1843, after which he remained in Jefferson City. He had a wife and three children. He died on September 18, 1851, aged 74.

Political offices
Preceded by John Walker	Missouri State Treasurer; 1838–1843	Succeeded by Peter Garland Glover
