= Peter Garland Glover =

American politician (1792–1851)

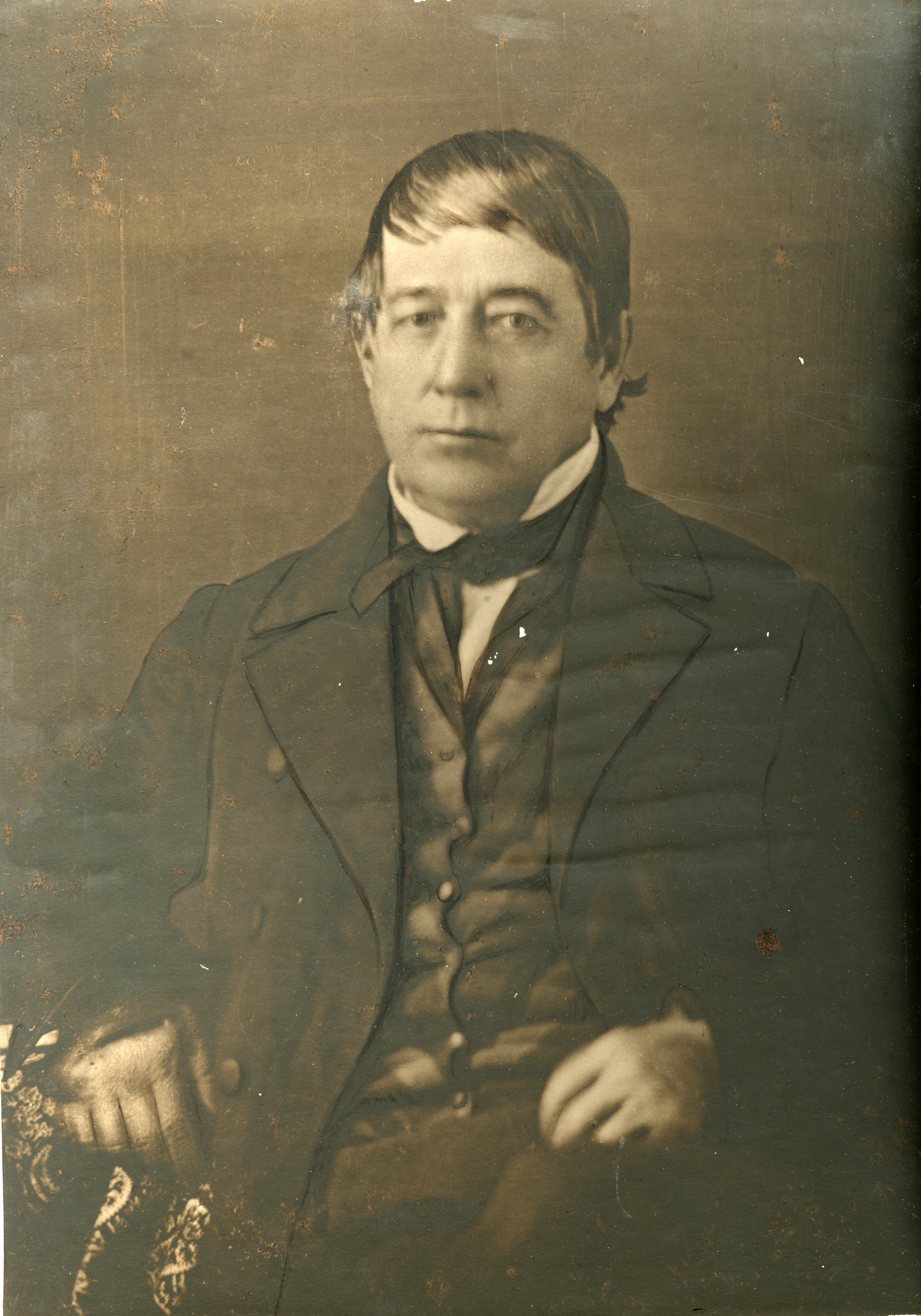

State Treasurer of Missouri
- In office January 11, 1843 – October 27, 1851
- Governor: Thomas Reynolds; Meredith Miles Marmaduke; John C. Edwards; Austin Augustus King
- Preceded by: Abraham McClellan
- Succeeded by: Alfred William Morrison

Missouri Secretary of State
- In office May 27, 1837–1839
- Preceded by: John C. Edwards
- Succeeded by: James Lawerence Minor

State Auditor of Missouri
- In office March 1835–1837
- Preceded by: Henry Shurlds
- Succeeded by: Hiram H. Baber

Member of the Missouri House of Representatives
- In office 1832–1835

Member of the Missouri Senate from the 29th district
- In office 1842

Personal details
- Born: January 14, 1792 Buckingham County, Virginia, US
- Died: October 27, 1851 (aged 59) Osage County, Missouri, US
- Party: Democratic Party
- Occupation: Politician

Peter Garland Glover (January 14, 1792 – October 27, 1851) was an American politician. He served in multiple Missouri state offices, including State Auditor, Secretary of State, and State Treasurer.

== Biography ==
Glover was born on January 14, 1792, in Buckingham County, Virginia, later moving to Callaway County, Missouri with his family. A Democrat, he served as a Callaway County judge from 1830 to 1832, resigning from his position to represent Callaway County in the Missouri House of Representatives, which he served in from 1832 to 1835. Other Missouri offices he served in include Register of Lands; Auditor, from March 1835 to 1837; Secretary of State, from May 27, 1837 to 1839; and the state's first and only School Commissioner, from 1839 to 1841. He served in the Missouri Senate in 1842 and represented the 29th district; he resigned to serve as State Treasurer. As treasurer, he was paid $1,250 per year, as well as a bond of $100,000. He served from January 11, 1843, until dying in office in 1851. Over the span of his career, he held every state office in Missouri, with exception to Governor, though was the current Democratic gubernatorial candidate at the time of his death.

Glover had eleven children with his wife, Martha Moseley. He lived on a farm in Jefferson City, beginning in 1832. He died on October 27, 1851, aged 59, in Osage County, from illness, and is buried in the Woodland Cemetery, in Jefferson City.

Political offices
Preceded by Henry Shurlds	Missouri State Auditor; 1835–1837	Succeeded by Hiram H. Baber
Preceded by John C. Edwards	Missouri Secretary of State; 1837–1839	Succeeded by James Lawerence Minor
Preceded by Abraham McClellan	Missouri State Treasurer; 1843–1851	Succeeded by Alfred William Morrison
