= Alfred William Morrison =

American politician (1802–1883)

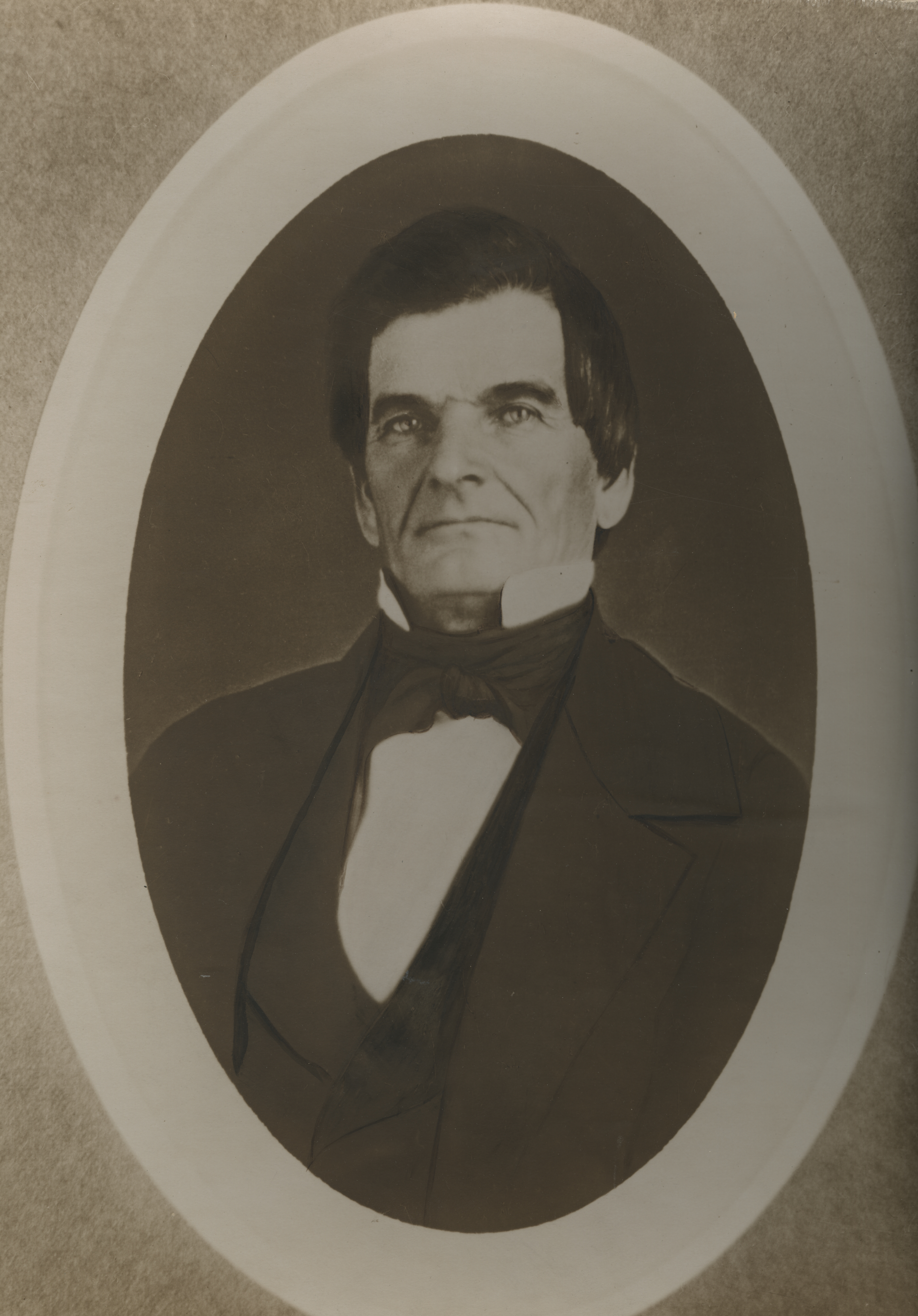

State Treasurer of Missouri
- In office 1851–1861
- Governor: Austin A. King
- Preceded by: Peter Garland Glover
- Succeeded by: George Caleb Bingham

Personal details
- Born: November 25, 1802 Jessamine County, Kentucky, US
- Died: August 24, 1883 (aged 80) Fayette, Missouri, US
- Party: Democratic
- Children: 2

Alfred William Morrison (November 25, 1802 – August 24, 1883) was an American politician. He served as State Treasurer of Missouri from 1851 until resigning in 1861.

== Biography ==
Morrison was born on November 25, 1802, in Jessamine County, Kentucky. In 1821, he moved to Howard County, Missouri. Trained as a surveyor by his stepfather, he served for a decade as Howard County Surveyor, where he was responsible for surveying sites which would eventually become the towns of New Franklin, Fayette, Roanoke, and Boonesboro. Other Howard County government posts he held included sheriff, assessor, and county judge. He was a Democrat. He owned slaves, and in 1830, had them build him the Alfred W. Morrison House.

In 1845, President James K. Polk appointed him as receiver of the United States General Land Office at Fayette, Missouri, where he served until 1849. In 1851, Governor Austin A. King appointed him as State Treasurer of Missouri, filling a vacancy caused by the death of incumbent Peter Garland Glover. In late June 1861, the Union army had partially invaded Missouri, and Claiborne Fox Jackson made senator Trusten Polk warn him about the potential seize from Missouri banks. Soon after, Morrison was captured by Nathaniel Lyon and his forces in Hermann. He served as state treasurer until 1861, when he resigned in protest of a constitutional requirement to take a loyalty oath.

Upon leaving office, Morrison returned to his farm near Fayette. He married Minerva Jackson, a second cousin of governor Claiborne Fox Jackson, on March 15, 1812. She and Morrison had two children together. She died in 1858, and in 1861, he married Martha Johnson. He died on August 24, 1883, aged 80, on his farm near Fayette.

Political offices
Preceded by Peter Garland Glover	Missouri State Treasurer; 1851–1861	Succeeded by George Caleb Bingham
