= George M. Bibb =

American politician (1776–1859)

George Bibb
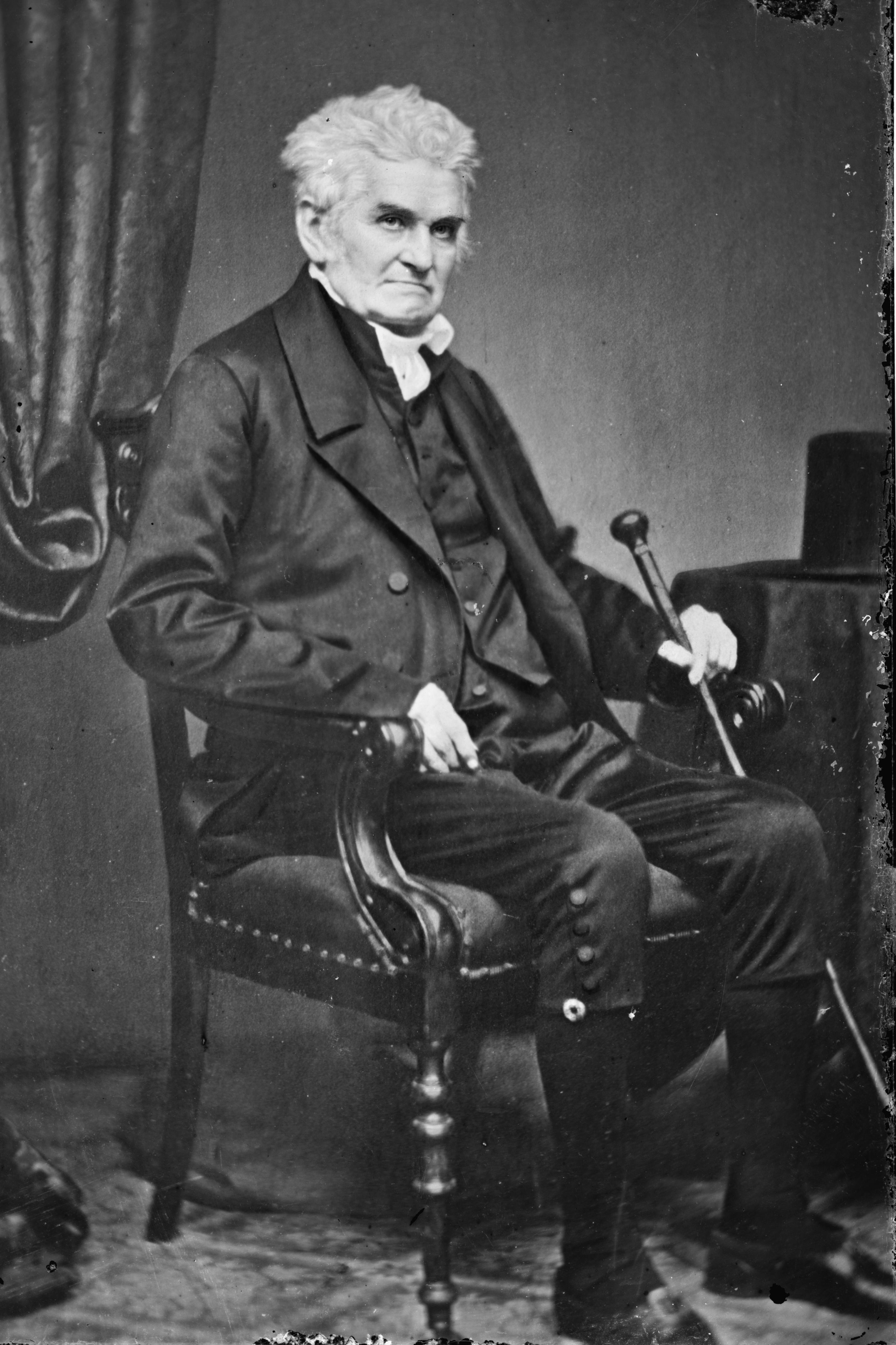

17th United States Secretary of the Treasury
- In office July 4, 1844 – March 7, 1845
- President: John Tyler; James K. Polk
- Preceded by: John C. Spencer
- Succeeded by: Robert J. Walker

United States Senator from Kentucky
- In office March 4, 1829 – March 3, 1835
- Preceded by: Richard Johnson
- Succeeded by: John J. Crittenden
- In office March 4, 1811 – August 23, 1814
- Preceded by: Henry Clay
- Succeeded by: George Walker

Chief Justice of the Kentucky Court of Appeals
- In office 1809-1810
- In office 1827–1828

Judge of the Kentucky Court of Appeals
- In office 1808-1808; 1827-1828

Member of the Kentucky House of Representatives
- In office 1806; 1810; 1817

Personal details
- Born: George Mortimer Bibb; October 30, 1776 Prince Edward County, Virginia
- Died: April 14, 1859 (aged 82) Georgetown, Washington, D.C., U.S.
- Resting place: Frankfort Cemetery
- Party: Democratic
- Spouse: Martha Tabb Scot
- Education: Hampden-Sydney College; College of William & Mary (BA)

George Mortimer Bibb (October 30, 1776 – April 14, 1859) was an American lawyer and politician and the seventeenth United States Secretary of the Treasury. He was chief justice of the Kentucky Court of Appeals and twice represented Kentucky as a senator in Congress, serving from 1811 to 1814 and from 1829 to 1835.

== Early life and education ==
Bibb was born in Prince Edward County, Virginia, on October 30, 1776. He graduated from Hampden–Sydney College in 1791, and later graduated from the College of William & Mary, then studied law.

== Career ==
Bibb was admitted to the bar and practiced law in Virginia and Lexington, Kentucky. After making a permanent move to Kentucky, Bibb was elected to the Kentucky House of Representatives in 1806, 1810, and again in 1817. He was appointed a judge of the Kentucky Court of Appeals in 1808 and then chief justice through 1810.

While a wealthy man, he claimed to have faced significant financial difficulties from losses in the Panic of 1837.

Following the death of his father, the Reverend Richard Bibb Sr., George Bibb advised his brother on how to carry out his father's instructions in his will to emancipate his slaves. George Bibb did so despite his personal pro-slavery views.

However, he did not emancipate his own slaves, believing that free blacks were "a nuisance to society." At the time of Bibb's death, his body servant Willis was auctioned in Washington DC, near the White House.

In 1811, he was elected to the U.S. Senate from Kentucky and served until 1814 when he again returned to Lexington to work as a lawyer. He moved to Frankfort, Kentucky in 1816 and sided with the New Court faction in the Old Court-New Court controversy in the 1820s. He was again named Chief Justice of the Kentucky Court of Appeals in 1827, serving for a year.

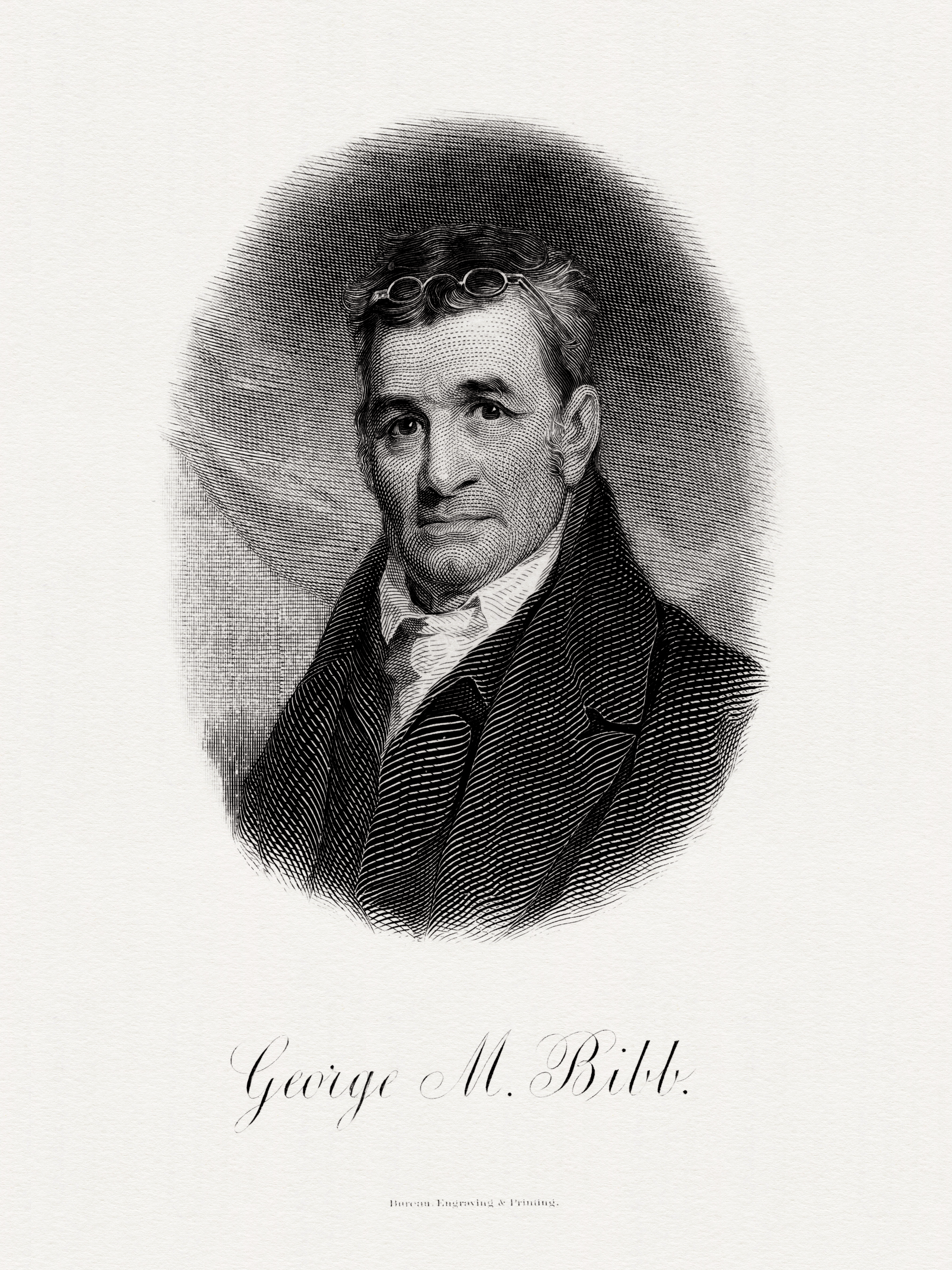
A Bureau of Engraving and Printing portrait of Bibb as U.S. Secretary of the Treasury

He was re-elected to the United States Senate in 1829 and served as a Jacksonian Democrat through 1835. During the 21st Congress he was chairman of the U.S. Senate Committee on Post Office and Post Roads. While in the Senate, he was a strong advocate for pro-slavery views. In 1834, he was the sole Democratic member of the Senate to vote in support of the censure of President Andrew Jackson.

He was chancellor of the Louisville Chancery Court from 1835 through 1844 and in 1844 became President John Tyler's fourth U.S. Secretary of the Treasury, serving through 1845.

He was in his late sixties when he assumed his Treasury position, dressing "in antique style, with kneebreeches." Bibb's Annual Report on the State of the Finances for 1844 consisted of an elaborate compilation of statistics detailing the financial history of the nation since 1789. In addition, he presented a solid argument for the establishment of a "sinking fund," accumulated through regular deposits and used to pay the interest and principal on the national debt. Bibb advocated using Treasury surplus revenue from customs and internal revenue collection to supply the sinking fund. Such a fund had been used effectively to reduce the deficit from 1789 to 1835, but Bibb was unable to revive it.

After this he was a lawyer in Washington, D.C., and an assistant in the U.S. Attorney General's office.

He was an active Freemason. He was the first master of Russellville Lodge No. 17, in Russellville, Kentucky, and was master of Hiram Lodge No. 4, in Frankfort, Kentucky. He was also past master of Lexington Lodge No. 1, in Lexington, Kentucky, and served as secretary in 1804. In 1804 he was grand master of Kentucky.

== Death ==
He died in Georgetown, in 1859, and is buried in Frankfort Cemetery with a cenotaph at Congressional Cemetery.

U.S. Senate
Preceded by Henry Clay	U.S. senator (Class 2) from Kentucky; 1811–1814; Served alongside: John Pope, Jesse Bledsoe	Succeeded by George Walker
Preceded by Richard M. Johnson	U.S. senator (Class 2) from Kentucky; 1829–1835; Served alongside: John Rowan, Henry Clay	Succeeded by John J. Crittenden
Political offices
Preceded by John C. Spencer	U.S. Secretary of the Treasury; Served under: John Tyler; 1844–1845	Succeeded by Robert J. Walker
Honorary titles
Preceded by Alexander Campbell	Most senior living U.S. senator (Sitting or former); November 5, 1857 - April 14, 1859	Succeeded by John J. Crittenden
