= George Caleb Bingham =

American artist (1811–1879)

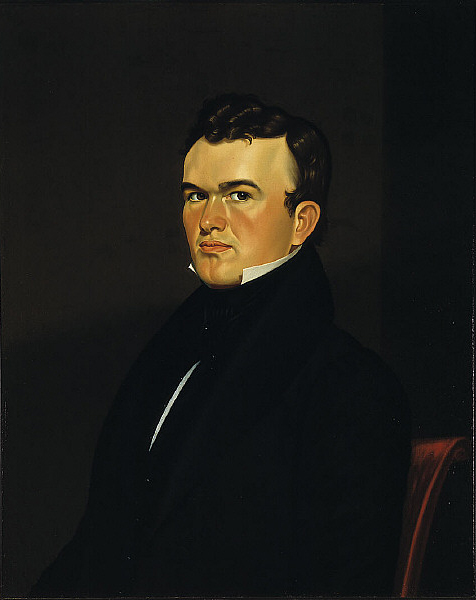
- A self-portrait by George Caleb Bingham, painted 1834–35
- Born: March 20, 1811; Augusta County, Virginia, U.S.
- Died: July 7, 1879 (aged 68); Kansas City, Missouri, U.S.
- Education: Autodidact (study of prints of Old Masters and copybooks); Pennsylvania Academy of the Fine Arts
- Known for: Painting
- Movement: Luminism

George Caleb Bingham (March 20, 1811 – July 7, 1879) is recognized as one of the most important American artists of the 19th century. Known in his lifetime as “the Missouri artist,” he is distinguished among the first generation of painters of the early American West for classic narrative scenes drawn from his observation and experience.

His most famous paintings chronicle America’s westward expansion and depict life along the Mississippi and Missouri rivers. Rendered in the style of “genre painting,” Bingham’s works capture the unique aspects of the American frontier with themes of community engagement, leisure, and river life before the steamboat era. His Fur Traders Descending the Missouri (1845, The Metropolitan Museum of Art, New York) is a renowned example of Bingham’s genre paintings, containing a colorful cast of characters and scenes imbued with layers of symbolism and socio-political commentary.

Today, Bingham’s paintings portraying fur trappers, riverboat men, fishermen, politicians and frontier settlers are considered national treasures and can be viewed as vivid historical records of the politics, commerce and social relations of everyday life of the American frontier. His paintings are held in important private and museum collections, notably: National Gallery of Art; National Portrait Gallery; Wadsworth Atheneum; Amon Carter Museum of American Art; Saint Louis Art Museum, the Nelson-Atkins Museum of Art; Los Angeles County Museum of Art; Fine Arts Museum of San Francisco, Brooklyn Museum; and The White House. He was also a prolific portrait artist, producing as many as 500 portraits depicting numerous pioneering Missourians, important politicians from the state, as well as famous figures such as John Quincy Adams, the sixth US president who served from 1825 to 1829, and Senator Daniel Webster.[1]

All of Bingham’s known paintings, including recently discovered works, are compiled in the George Caleb Bingham Catalogue Raisonné, a public-access electronic catalogue launched in 2018 that builds on the work of 20th century American art scholar E. Maurice Bloch (1916 -1989). In 1986 Bloch published The Paintings of George Caleb Bingham: A Catalogue Raisonné

== Early life and education ==
Born on a farm in Augusta County, Virginia, George Caleb Bingham was the second of seven children that Mary Amend (1789–1851) bore with her husband Henry Vest Bingham (1784–1823). Upon their marriage, Mary's father Matthias Amend gave the Binghams ownership of the family mill, 1,180 acres (4.8 km^{2}) land, and several slaves with the agreement that Matthias could live with the family for the rest of his life. Henry Bingham offered the land and mill as surety for a friend's debt and, when the friend died in 1818, all was lost. In 1819, the Bingham family (including grandfather Amend) moved to Franklin, Missouri, on the Missouri River near the state's center as well as the eastern terminus of the Santa Fe Trail, "where the land was said to be bountiful, fertile and cheap."

Bingham was eight years old when he moved to Missouri with his parents, and grew up around Franklin, Arrow Rock and Boonville. He was initially educated by his mother, and mostly self-taught as an artist. When he was nine, he met the artist Chester Harding (1792-1866). The young Bingham, who had already shown an interest in sketching and drawing and had received some art tutoring from a local teacher [2], was assigned to assist Harding, who was seeking new portrait commissions and had recently finished one of Daniel Boone. Harding provided young Bingham with paints and brushes and encouraged him to continue painting on his own. The experience left a lasting impression on him.

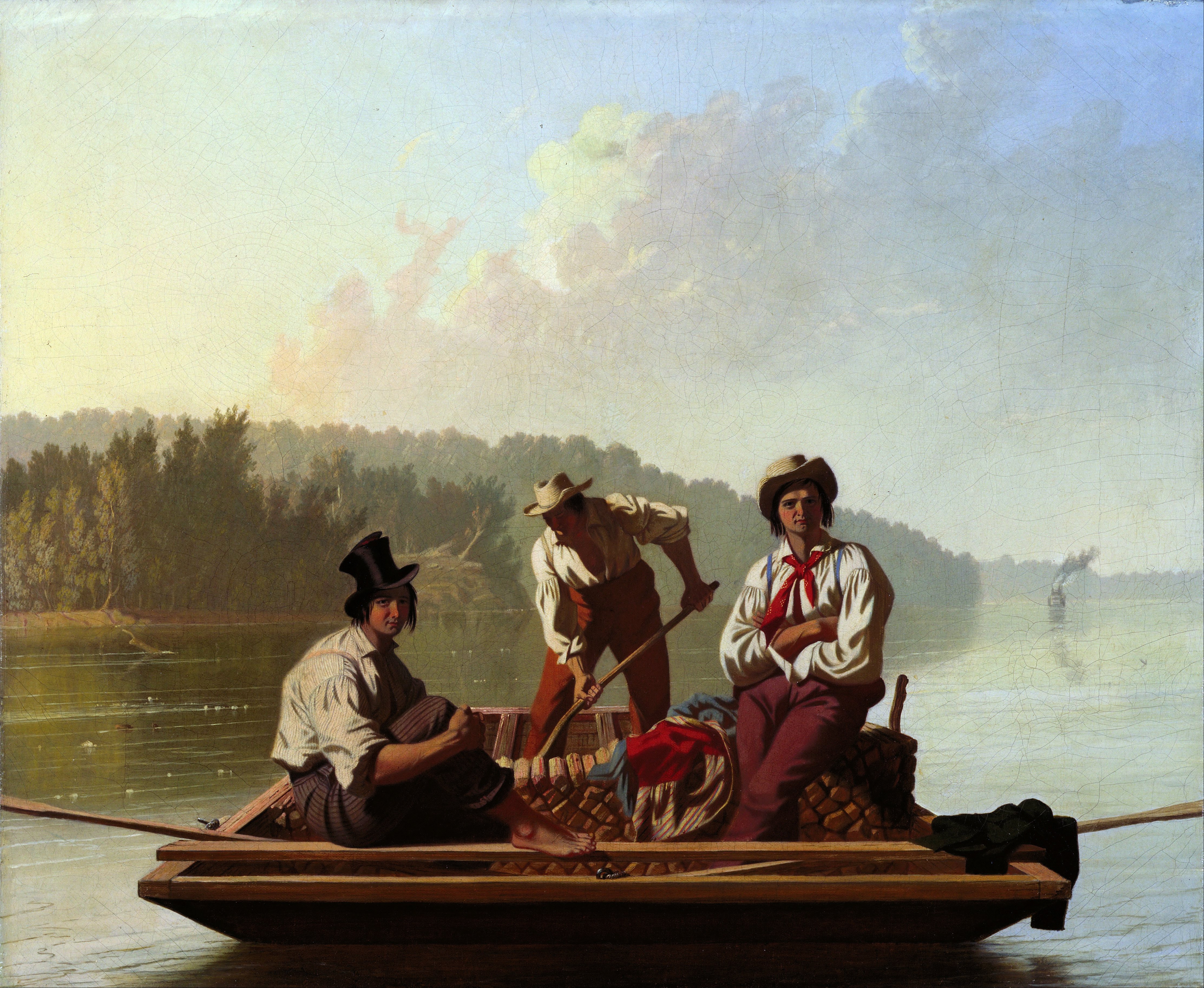
Boatmen on the Missouri, 1846, Fine Arts Museums of San Francisco

On December 23, 1823, Bingham's father Henry, who had initially opened a tavern in Franklin and in 1821 become the judge of the Howard County Court, died of malaria at the age of thirty-eight. His investment in a tobacco venture had failed, and debts forced the sale of the home in Franklin. The young sons barely kept their small farm in nearby Saline County afloat, in part with the help of their father's brother John, who had moved to the area and donated half the land which became Arrow Rock. Mary Bingham opened a school for girls on the farmstead. George, then twelve, worked as the school janitor, and later received some art tutoring when the school hired Mattie Wood as an art teacher.

At age sixteen, the young Bingham was apprenticed to cabinet maker Jesse Green in nearby Boonville in Cooper County. After Green moved away (a major flood of the Missouri River having destroyed much of Franklin and other riverside towns in 1827), Bingham apprenticed with another cabinet maker, Justinian Williams. Both tradesmen were Methodist ministers. While under their tutelage, Bingham studied religious texts, preached at camp meetings and thought about becoming a minister in his Baptist Church (in which he would remain active throughout his life). He also considered becoming a lawyer.

When Harding and Bingham met again 10 years later, Bingham was struggling with various career directions in carpentry, religion and the law. Harding, assessing Bingham’s artistic talent, advised him to begin a professional career as a portrait painter on a commission basis. Bingham followed that advice, and he supported himself for most of his career as a portrait artist. His success also provided him with enough money for travels to New York, Philadelphia and other major cities, including in Europe, in pursuit of commissions, broader exposure to the art world, and formal art education.

== Artistic development and career ==
By age nineteen, Bingham was painting portraits for $20.00 apiece, often completing the works in a single day. He found clients in Howard and Saline counties and nearby areas. Though his painting abilities were still developing, he impressed his patrons by strong draftsmanship as well as his native ability to capture his subject's likeness, and he was able to support himself by this work by 1833.

By 1838, he had established a studio in St. Louis and was beginning to make a name for himself as a portrait artist. His clients included prominent local citizens, including the lawyer, James S. Rollins of Columbia, Missouri, who would become Bingham’s lifelong friend as well as an important politician in the state. He also painted Rollins’ 10-year-old sister, Portrait of Sarah Helen Rollins, his first full-length portrait that is now a classic model of a frontier girl dressed in her Sunday best.

Bingham then decided to try formal education in the east, and moved with his young wife to Philadelphia, Pennsylvania, where he spent three years studying art at the Pennsylvania Academy of the Fine Arts, including a trip to New York City to visit the National Academy of Design exhibition. Bingham then spent nearly five years in Washington, D.C., where he painted portraits of various politicians, including John Quincy Adams

Upon his return home to Missouri in 1845, Bingham began to paint his best-known works of narrative scenes drawn from everyday life along the Mississippi and Missouri Rivers, capturing the frontier world of a burgeoning young America—workers, traders and fisherman, settlers, townspeople, merchants and government officials.

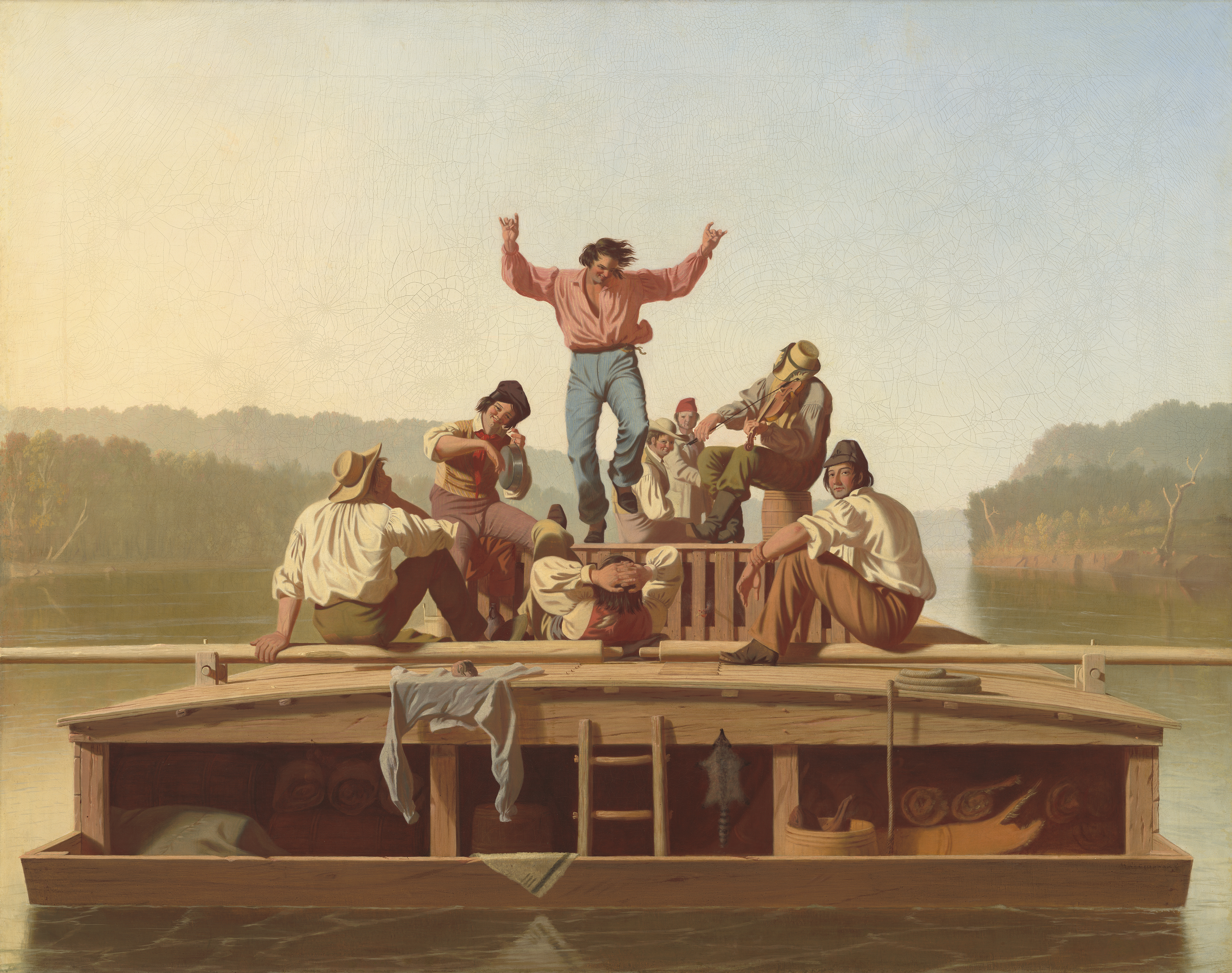
Jolly Flatboatmen, 1846

In 1846, he painted the first of his iconic riverboat men scenes, The Jolly Boatman [1] (National Gallery of Art), capturing a moment of leisure for the crew of a cargo raft, featuring a central figure dancing exuberantly to a fiddle. An engraving of the painting was widely distributed by the American Art Union based in New York and helped establish Bingham’s reputation. The art union would purchase and distribute prints of An engraving of the painting was widely distributed by the American Art Union based in New York and helped establish Bingham’s reputation. The art union would purchase and distribute seven more prints of his paintings in the next seven years.seven more paintings in the next seven years.

== Marriage and family ==
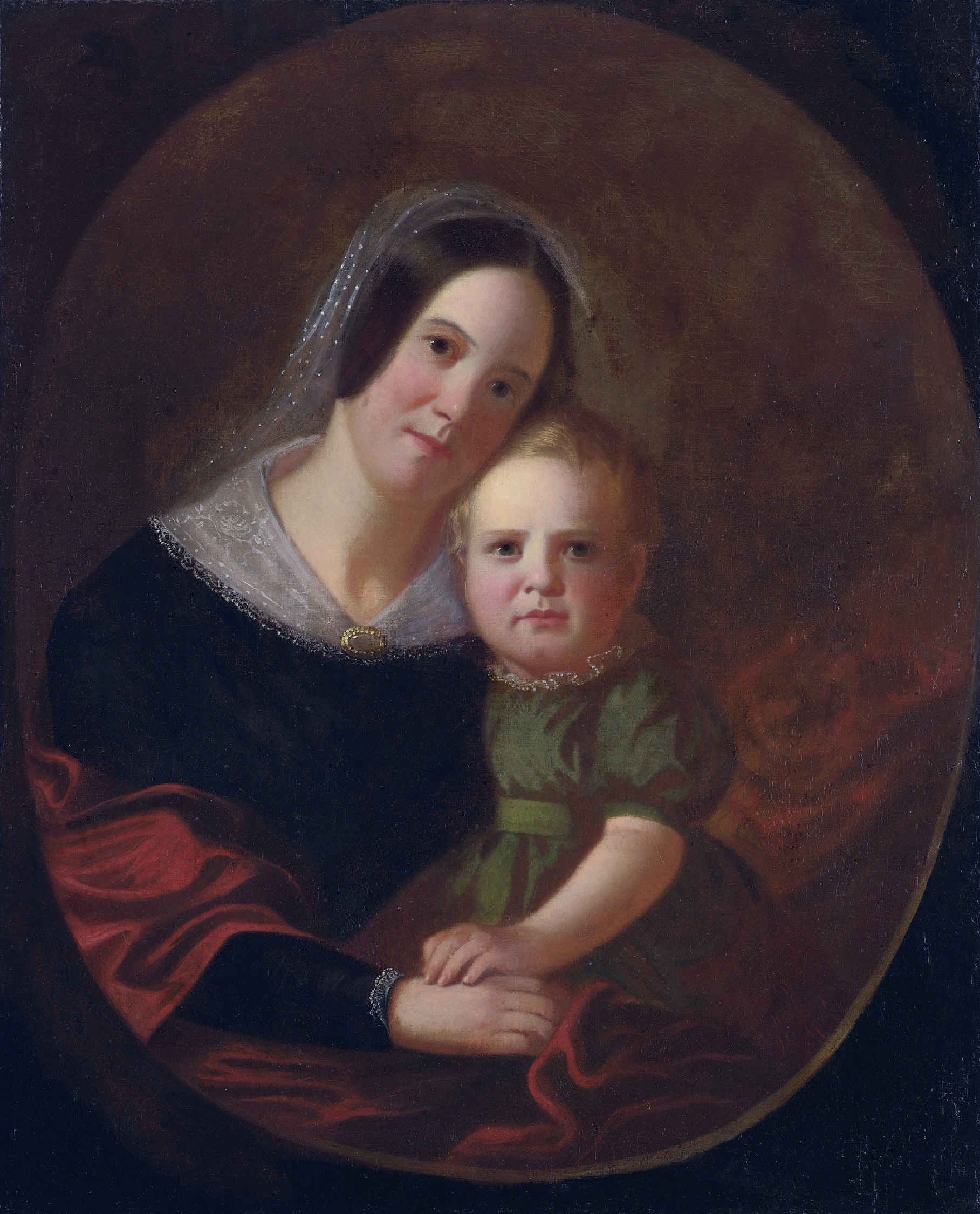
His first wife, Sarah, and eldest son, Newton, who died when 4 years old. (George Caleb Bingham, ca 1841)

In 1836, the year Missouri expanded with the Platte Purchase of former Native American territory (thus violating the Missouri Compromise of 1820 which had led to the state's creation), 25-year-old Bingham married 18-year-old Sarah Elizabeth Hutchison (1818–1848), who bore him four children before her death. From 1837 to 1845 they lived in Arrow Rock in Saline County, where their house has been designated a National Historic Landmark. She died in 1848 at the age of twenty-nine. Bingham's mother Mary helped him raise his children before she died in 1851.

Bingham married twice more, first to Eliza K. Thomas. After several years, she was confined to a mental asylum, where she died in 1876. He next married the widow Martha Lykins, a Kansas City community activist respected for her work among orphans (despite her Confederate activism years earlier), but their marriage lasted less than a year before Bingham died (Martha Lykins Bingham died in 1890).

Bingham ran for election as a Whig to the Missouri House of Representatives the following year. He appeared to have won in 1846 by 3 votes, but lost in a recount. In a reprise of the election in 1848, Bingham won the seat by a decisive margin, becoming one of the few artists to serve in elected political office. He actively opposed the pro-slavery "Jackson resolutions" in 1849, although their proponent was also a resident of Saline County. He would also represent Missouri's eighth district at the Whig National Convention in June 1852. Bingham's political interests would be reflected in his vivid paintings of frontier political life.

== Europe ==
In 1856, two years after the tumultuous creation of the Kansas Territory, Bingham traveled to Europe for an extensive tour with his second wife Eliza and youngest daughter. First they stayed in Paris for several months, where Bingham fulfilled a long-cherished desire and studied the Old Masters at the Louvre Museum, likely his chief reason for going abroad. They went on to Düsseldorf, Germany, where they lived until 1859, taking part in the Düsseldorf school of painting. Bingham lived and worked among the American and German artists of the art colony, among whom was the German-American Emanuel Leutze, the most prominent historical painter in the United States. (Washington Crossing the Delaware was then his most famous work.) Leutze was unusual for living in both countries and had an open studio in Düsseldorf, where he welcomed Bingham as a friend and already successful artist. While in Germany, Bingham worked on important commissions from the Missouri State Legislature of Presidents Washington and Jefferson (later destroyed by fire), as well as independent paintings.

== American Civil War ==
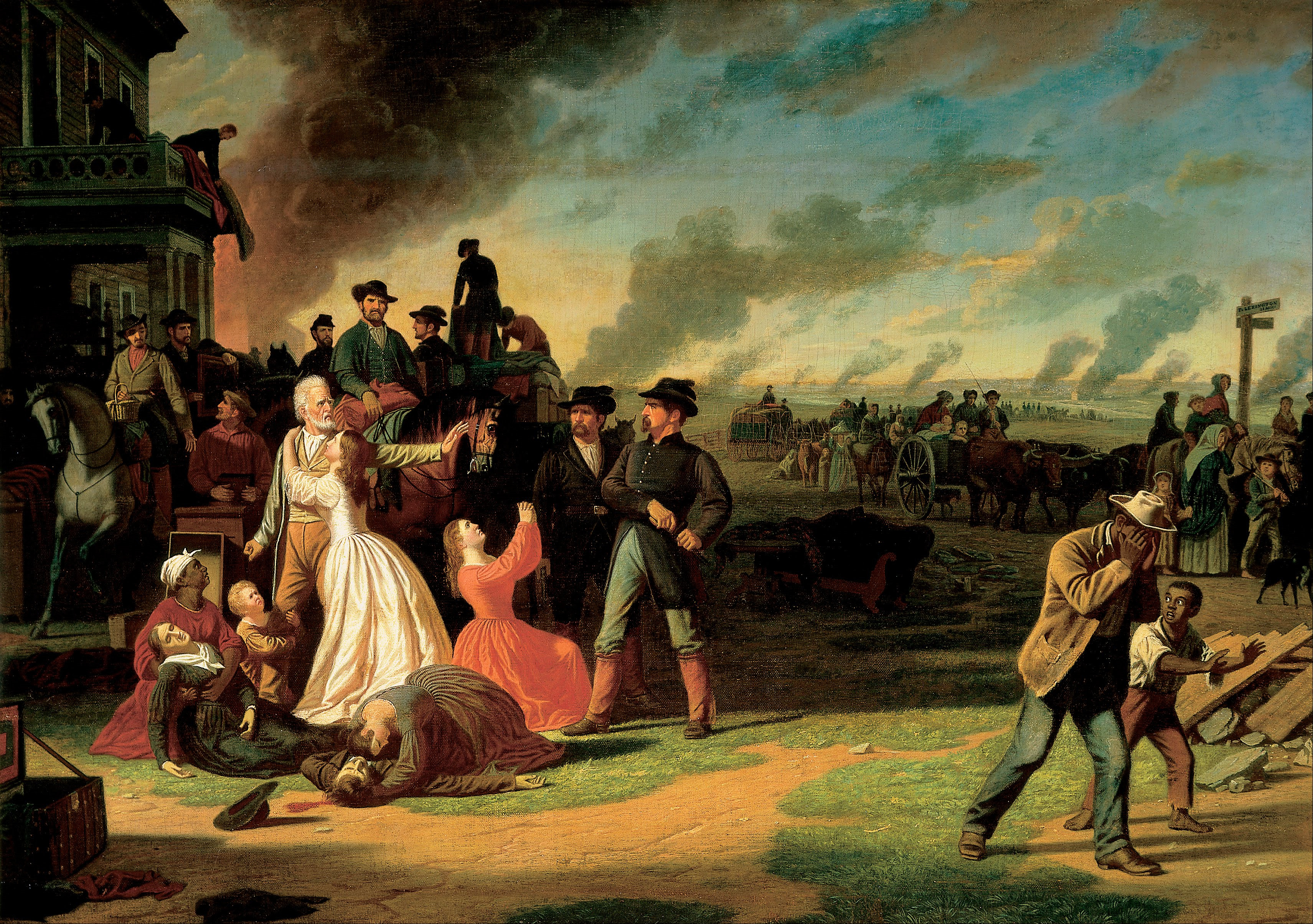
General Ewing's Order No. 11 of 1863 (painted 1868)

Bingham returned to America after the death of his wife's father in 1859. He continued to travel throughout Missouri seeking commissions, and again became involved in politics. In the 1860 election, Missourians had elected his one-time opponent, Democrat Claiborne Fox Jackson, governor in part because Jackson declared himself anti-secession. Abraham Lincoln had also been elected president and secession talk abounded. Upon taking office, Governor Jackson opened communications with Confederates, including Jefferson Davis, and sent the state national guard's artillery pieces down the Mississippi River for Confederate service. Bingham, as a dedicated Union man, raised troops to oppose Jackson and his appointed ally, Major General Sterling Price, and was commissioned as a captain. Union forces routed the Confederates at Boonville on June 17 and again on September 13, 1861. Between those battles, the Missouri Convention met and almost unanimously declared itself against secession, then declared the governor's position vacant and on July 28 elected Hamilton Gamble governor to replace Jackson. Jackson refused to accept his deposition, instead declaring Missouri a "Free Republic" on August 5 and traveling to Richmond, Virginia, to confer with Confederate officials.

In September 1861, Governor Gamble appointed Bingham State Treasurer of Missouri, and he served honestly and competently throughout the war. In 1863 Bingham vociferously opposed as inhumane Union General Ewing's Order No. 11, which ordered the depopulation of Cass, Bates and Jackson Counties and part of Vernon County in western Missouri to limit support for Confederate partisans. Bingham believed many of the atrocities on the Kansas–Missouri border were in fact committed by pro-Union "Jayhawkers" with Ewing's connivance. The order backfired by exacerbating resentments against occupying troops even by Union sympathizers (and later became the subject of a painting shown herein). Boonville also would be briefly occupied by Confederate troops on October 11, 1863, and again on October 11, 1864. Meanwhile, Bingham also continued to paint more portraits, which had always been his "bread and butter" work.

== Postwar career ==
Although the Whig Party was nearly defunct by the time Bingham returned to Missouri, Bingham also returned to politics, and he would later align with the Democratic Party. He continued to stay involved in politics in the post-Civil War years through political appointments. In 1874, he was appointed president of Kansas City Board of Police Commissioners, and appointed the first chief of police there. In 1875, the governor appointed Bingham as Adjutant-General of Missouri, so thereafter he was often referred to as "General Bingham".

Toward the end of his life, although quite ill, Bingham was appointed the first Professor of Art at the University of Missouri in Columbia, Missouri, which his friend Major Rollins and the Rollins family helped found. He met with only a few students before his death; among them was Amanda Austin.

== Death, legacy and honors ==
Bingham died on July 7, 1879, in Kansas City, Missouri. He was survived by his wife of less than a year, as well as his son by his second wife, (James) Rollins Bingham (1861–1910), who became a lawyer in Independence, Missouri. George Caleb Bingham was buried at Kansas City's Union Cemetery.

The following year, Rollins Bingham hauled his father's "Order No. 11" to Ohio and displayed it while opposing the gubernatorial run of its issuer, Gen. Thomas Ewing, Jr. (who lost the narrow race). Litigation concerning his late brother's estate in Mexico would drag on for years, and upon his wife's death, many of Bingham's works would be sold and the proceeds funded the Confederate Veterans Home despite Bingham's Union sympathies, although after her death her charitable work among orphans would continue under the auspices of the Little Sisters of the Poor.

As an artist, Bingham's reputation languished by the turn of the century, but increased in 1933, long after his death. Fellow Missouri artist Thomas Hart Benton (great-grandnephew of the Missouri Senator and slaveowner whose refusal to support extending slavery westward in 1849 impacted both his and Bingham's political careers) acknowledged Bingham, and the Metropolitan Museum of Art bought his early AAU work, Fur Traders Descending the Missouri described below. In 1934, the St. Louis Art Museum held a retrospective exhibition of his work, and others noticed his depictions of ordinary people from the middle of the previous century. However, by 1963, his gravestone had become defaced as that historic area of Kansas City deteriorated. Although activists restored Bingham's former home in Arrow Rock as the George Caleb Bingham House (which ultimately was designated a National Historic Landmark), their plans to rebury him near his father, first wife and other kin were thwarted; Kansas City instead decided to fix its historic but decrepit cemetery.

By the time of his bicentennial in 2011, Bingham was considered one of the greatest American painters of the 19th century.

Honors also include:

- The University of Missouri has named the George Caleb Bingham Art Gallery in his honor.
- George Caleb Bingham Junior High School, in Kansas City, Missouri (no longer in operation), was named for him.
- George Caleb Bingham Middle School (Formerly George Caleb Bingham 7th Grade Center) in the Independence Public School District in Independence, Missouri, was named after him because he served on the Independence Public School District Board Of Education.

== Newly discovered works ==
Since the publication in 1986 of E. Maurice Bloch’s authoritative The Paintings of George Caleb Bingham, recent discoveries of Bingham paintings have led to a revised and expanded catalogue of the artist’s work. Today the George Caleb Bingham Catalogue Raisonné, sponsored by the Riverbank Foundation in Kansas City, Missouri, builds on the work of Bloch, which he began in the 1940s. The GCBCR, free and accessible to the public, is among the first online catalogues raisonné dedicated to a major American artist.

The GCBCR initially began as a supplemental publication in 2005, directed and edited by art historian Fred R. Kline with advisory board members Paul Nagel and William Kloss. At the Bingham Bicentennial in 2011, ten newly discovered paintings were announced by the George Caleb Bingham Catalogue Raisonné Supplement of Paintings & Drawings. By June 2015, The GCBCRS, published online, had added 23 paintings to Bingham's body of work.

The paintings exhibited, catalogued and illustrated, include: Horse Thief (a political allegory posing the question of U.S. Constitutional law versus vigilantism in the Western regions of the U.S.); Baiting the Hook (Bingham's first river genre); Young Fisherman, Hudson River Palisades (Bingham's only known Hudson River painting). Portraits included: Colin Dunlop & His Dog; Lewis Allen Dicken Crenshaw; Fanny Smith Crenshaw; Frederick Moss Prewitt; Civil War Lt. Col. Levi Pritchard (Bingham's largest portrait at 80 inches high); Charles Chilton; Samuel Chilton; Thomas B. Hudson; Missouri Steamboat Capt. Joseph Kinney; and Martha Lykins, a previously unidentified woman who has now been recognized as Bingham's third wife, painted years before their marriage.

The digitalized GCBCR, launched in 2018, incorporates the supplement's findings and has since added more newly-identified paintings.

== Major works ==
=== Fur Traders Descending the Missouri ===
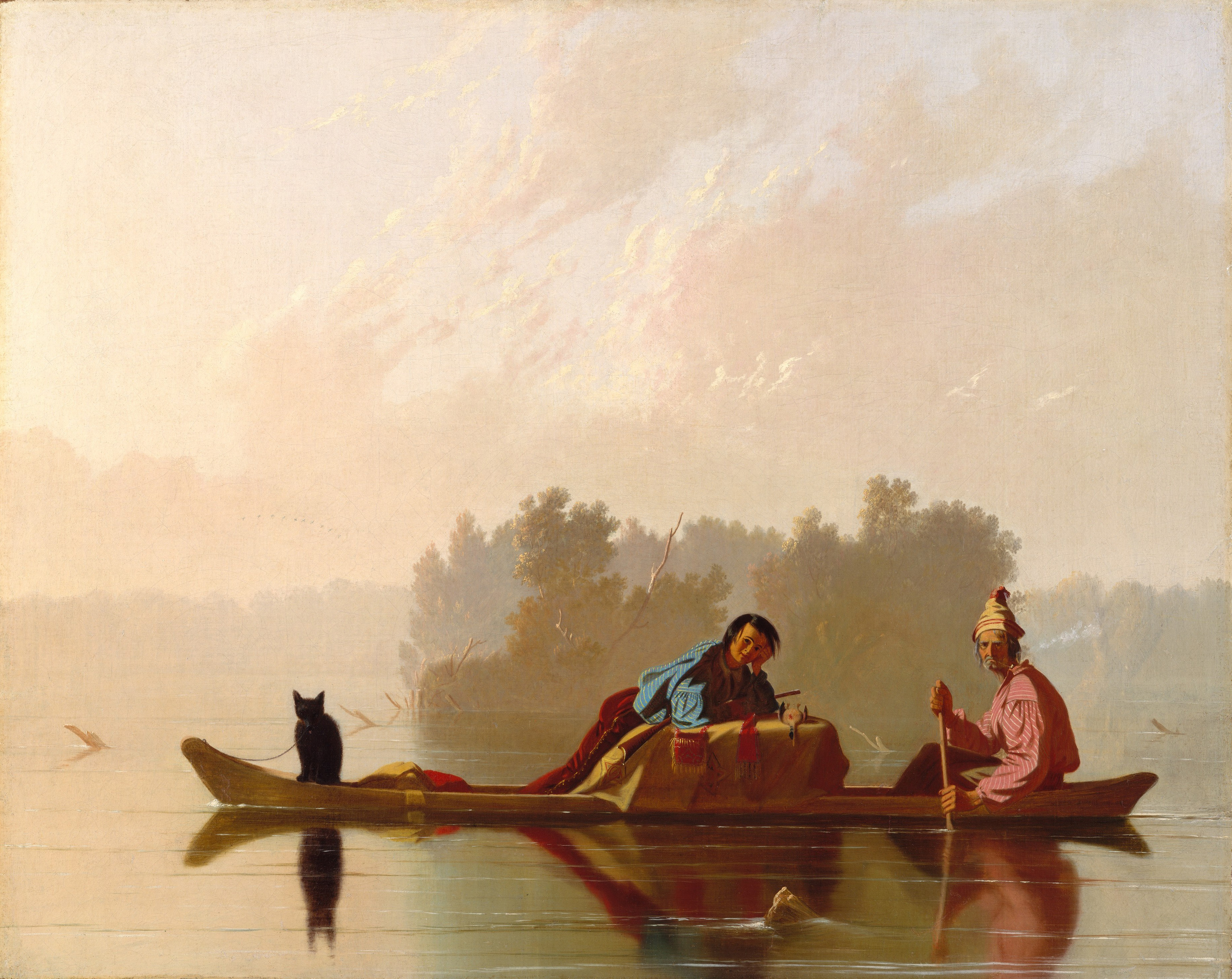
Fur Traders Descending the Missouri, c. 1845

One of Bingham's most famous paintings, this work is owned by the Metropolitan Museum of Art in New York. Painted around 1845 in the style called luminism by some historians of American art, it was originally entitled, French Trader, Half-breed Son. The American Art Union thought the title potentially controversial and renamed it when it was first exhibited. It reflected the reality of fur trappers and traders frequently marrying Native American women in their territories; in Canada the ethnic Métis people have been recognized by the government as a distinct group with status similar to First Nations. The painting is haunting for its evocation of an era in American history—note, in particular, the French-Canadian tuque, or cap, worn by the older man. A black fox (an animal of spiritual significance to Native Americans, whose fur was the most valuable of those traded at the time) is seated at the end of the boat and secured by a chain.

=== The Election Series ===
Bingham's Election Series comprises three paintings: The County Election, Stump Speaking, and The Verdict of the People. Bingham intended for the Election Series to reach a national audience rather than Missourians alone. To spread his idea of free people and free institutions, Bingham exhibited his paintings in Washington and urged the Library Committee of Congress to purchase them so American leaders could view them. When the Library Committee of Congress decided to not purchase his trio, he lent the paintings to the Mercantile Library Association in St. Louis.

==== The County Election ====
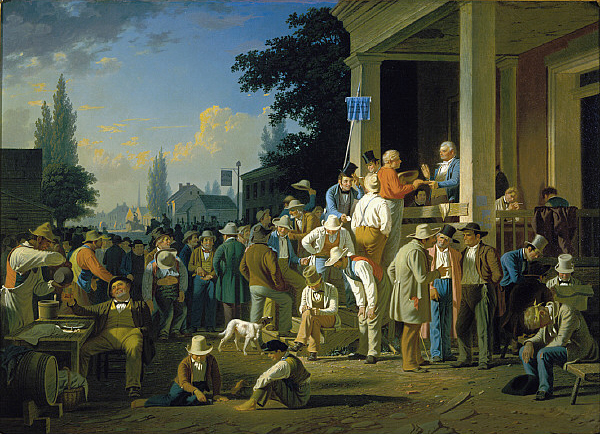
The County Election, 1852

The first painting made for the Election Series shows the voting process in Missouri. The County Election depicts a variety of people from several different social classes, such as young boys playing a game, two men talking about the election happening around them, and a mass of men walking up the stairs to vote. A banner shows the words, "The Will of the People[,] The Supreme Law", a credo that had great meaning for Bingham. He believed that people had a right to share their ideas; he also believed that he lost his seat in legislature in 1846 due to the improper following of the people's will. A mill in the background of the painting provided both a local detail and a reference to a Whig candidate who used a mill as a political symbol. The cedar barrels are evocative of a different Whig candidate who used cedar barrels as his political symbol. In his first painting of The County Election, Bingham showed two men flipping a coin beneath a judge. The two people represent ex-governor Marmaduke's bet that he had placed on the election of Bingham versus his opponent, Erasmus Sappington (allegedly the man in the tall hat soliciting votes is Erasmus Sappington). Bingham also purposefully kept the scene outside to represent universal suffrage, one of his beliefs. The openness of the setting shows that politics should happen in the open rather than behind the curtains of the government. The idea of universal suffrage agrees with Bingham's ideas of the will of the people: every white man should have the right to vote because the will of the people should be the supreme law. Allegedly Bingham is the man sitting on the courthouse steps

Though many people understood and supported the principles portrayed by Bingham, some believed that Bingham did not correctly portray his beliefs. A critic complained that the painting made a mockery of American principles by including details such as the drunkard voting in the foreground. The critic claimed that because Bingham had shown drinking and gambling as part of the election process, he was defaming the political process.

The reference to Marmaduke in The County Election was only relative to Missouri, so in order to generalize the message of the painting to the nation, Bingham removed the two men tossing a coin in the print version. In the corner of the original painting a newspaper title reads, "The Missouri Republican"; Bingham requested that the man who replicated his painting change the title to "The National Intelligencer" so that the painting would generalize to a larger audience.

==== Stump Speaking ====
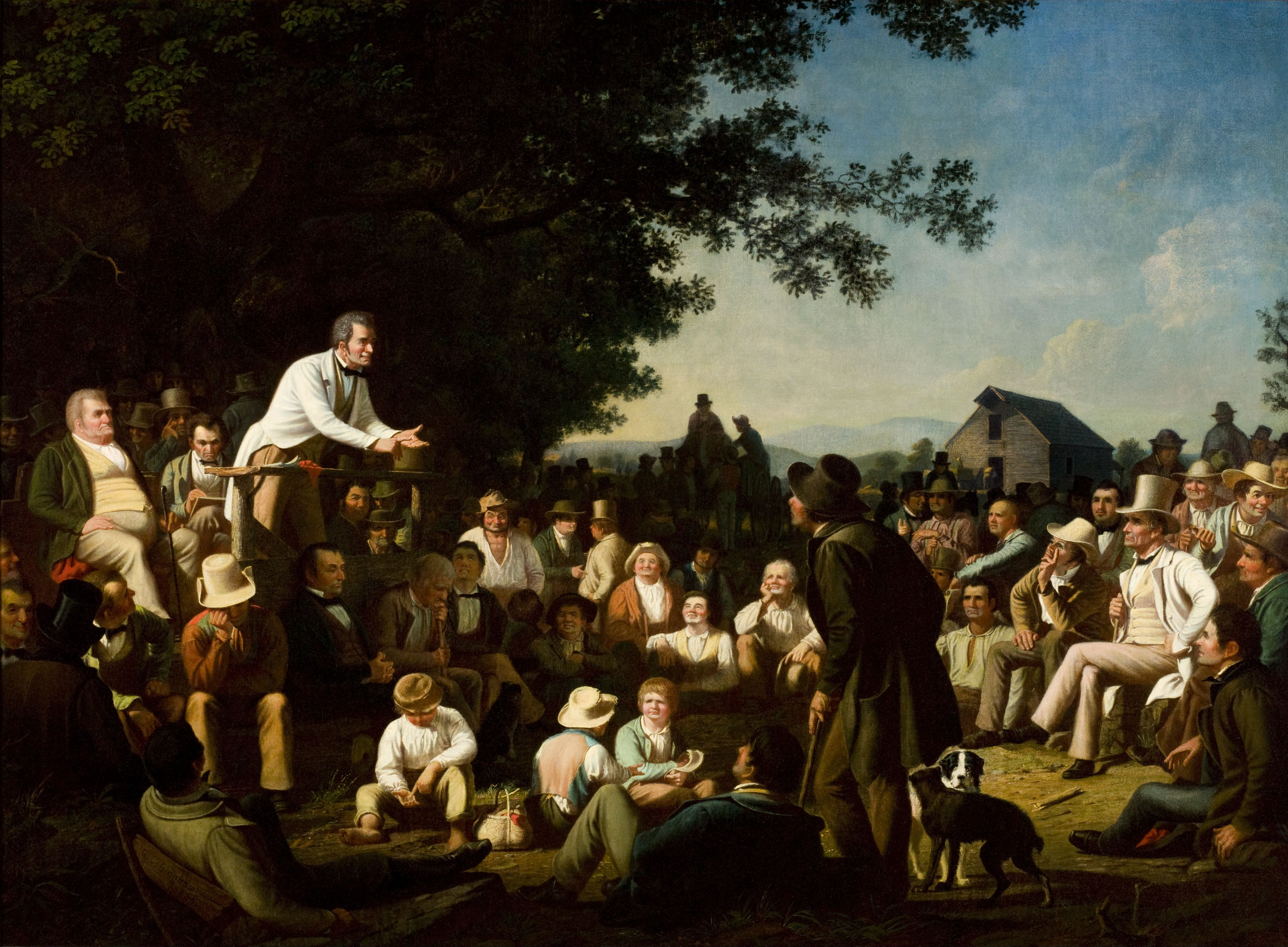
Stump Speaking, 1853–54

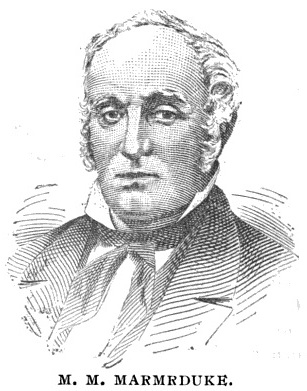
Meredith Miles Marmaduke

In the second painting of the trio, Stump Speaking, a politician persuades Missourians to vote in his favor. Depicted are three figures that stand out because of their startling bright white clothing: the "Stump Speaker", the "Outstanding Citizen" (the sitting man opposite of the speaker), and the "Small Businessman" (the young child in middle of the painting). Before the creation of the painting, Bingham had made preliminary sketches of the three aforementioned people, who represented Bingham's belief of the past, present, and future of American politics. The "Outstanding Citizen", as Bingham's sketch refers to him, represents the past as the man's sharp edges and fine clothes show how he is unwilling to bend his beliefs and instead works among the people. His sharp edges contrast with the softer curves of the "Stump Speaker", the character that represents the present of American politics. The "Stump Speaker" appears to be swaying the assembled crowd by bending to the people's desires, shown by the curving arm that is outstretched to the audience. The "Small Businessman" represents the future. That child shows how people are starting to focus more on their money, as the child is, and less on the politics, parallel to how the child is detached from the debate surrounding him. The three people represent "the Jeffersonian past, of statesmen and gentlemen farmers; the Jacksonian present, of demagogues, party hacks, and gullible citizens; and a materialistic future of isolated citizens with no common public life at all."

Within Bingham's painting Stump Speaking, he creates a scene that has both a national message and a local message; some of the people portrayed in the paintings resemble local Missouri politicians. Behind the speaker sits a man resembling Bingham's self-portrait taking notes about the speech, waiting for his turn to speak. The "Stump Speaker" resembled Sappington, who was Bingham's opponent in his previous elections, and the person sitting next to Bingham resembles the ex-governor of Missouri, Meredith Marmaduke. The "Outstanding Citizen" is Claiborne Fox Jackson (who was the Confererate Governor of Missouri)

==== The Verdict of the People ====
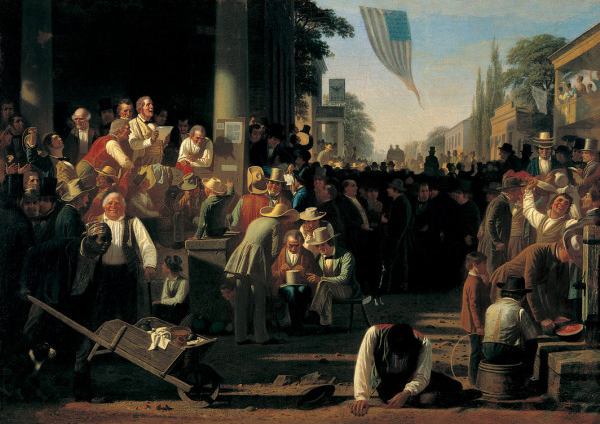
The Verdict of the People 1854–55

The last painting of Bingham's Election Series, The Verdict of the People, tells the end of the story represented in the series. Within this painting, Bingham hid several political motives and ideas similar to the rest of the Election Series. Completed in 1854, the work covered issues of slavery, temperance, and a representative government, subjects that had gone from a local to a national level. During the early 1850s, the temperance movement grew and more states were abolishing alcohol. A book by Herman Humphrey, titled Parallel between Intemperance and Slavery, associated the cause of anti-slavery to that of temperance. Bingham showed his view on intemperance and slavery by painting a banner that said, "Freedom for Virtue[,] Restriction for Vice." The banner referred to temperance by saying that the vice and alcohol would need to be restricted for the people to be free. The banner then references Bingham's ideas of slavery by using the connection of the temperance movement and the anti-slavery movement to show that Bingham thought negatively about slavery and shared that view with intemperance.

Charles Chilton, Samuel Chilton, Thomas B. Hudson, Missouri Steamboat Capt. Joseph Kinney and Martha Lykins, a previously unidentified woman who has now been recognized as Bingham's third wife, painted years before their marriage.

== Gallery ==
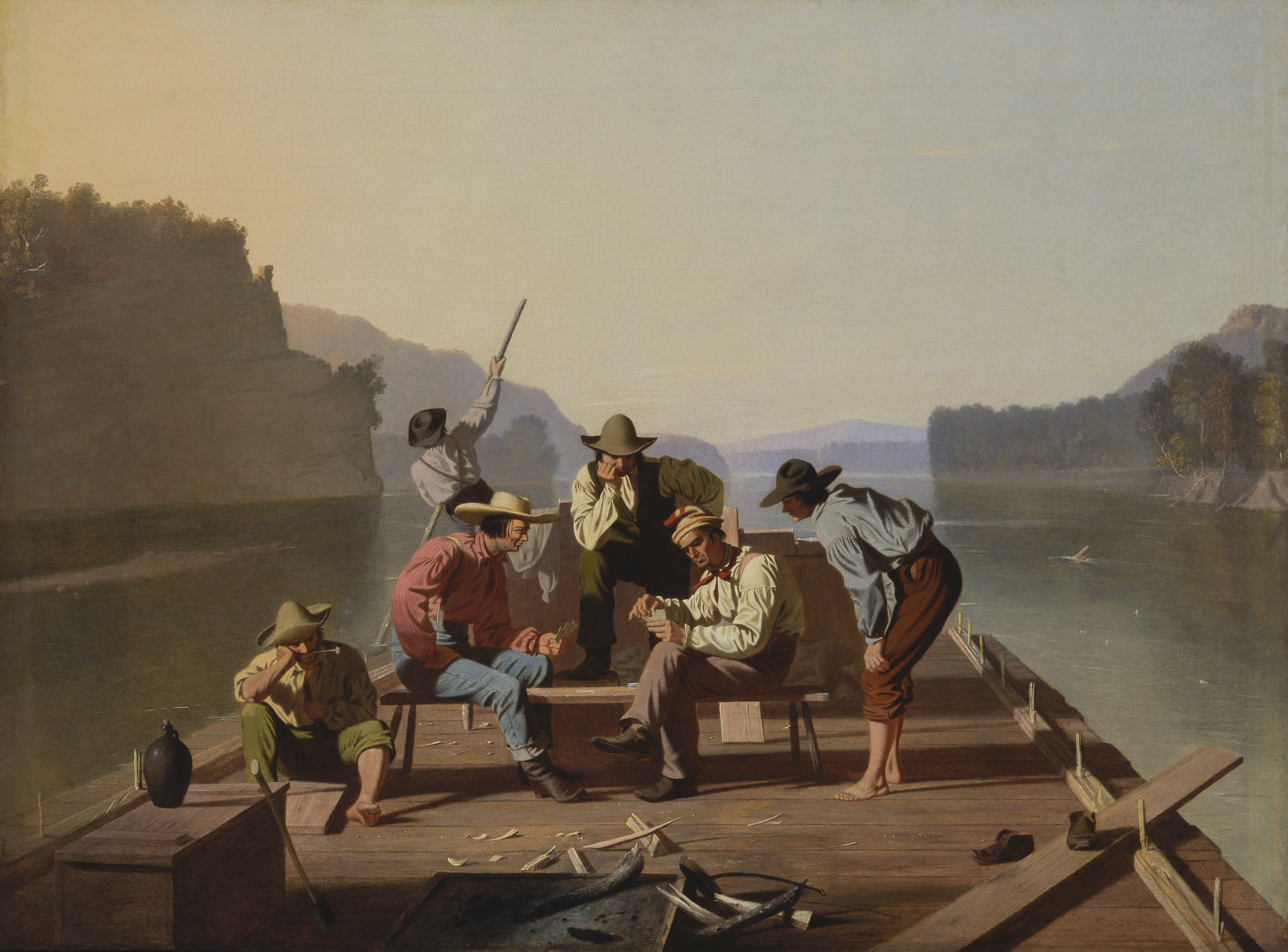
Raftsmen Playing Cards, 1847

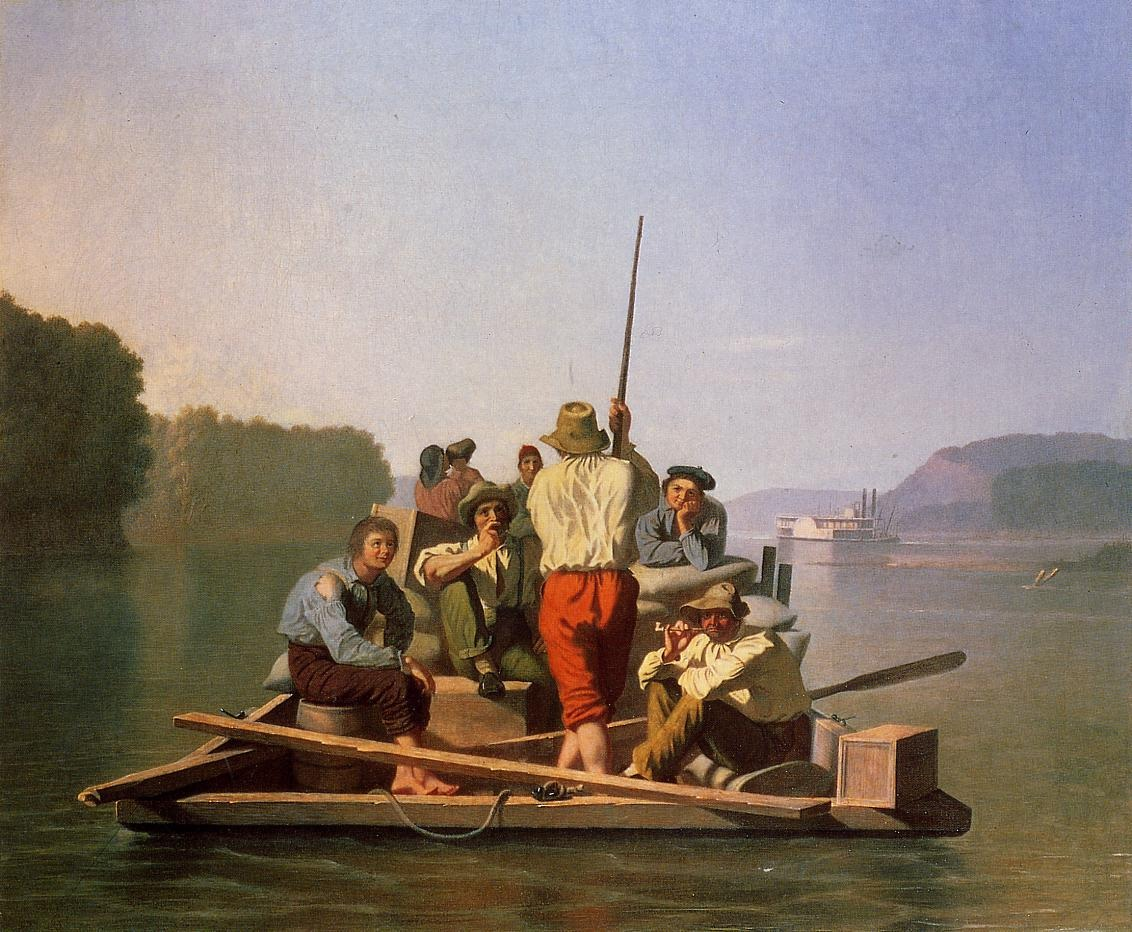
Lighter Relieving the Steamboat Aground, 1846–47

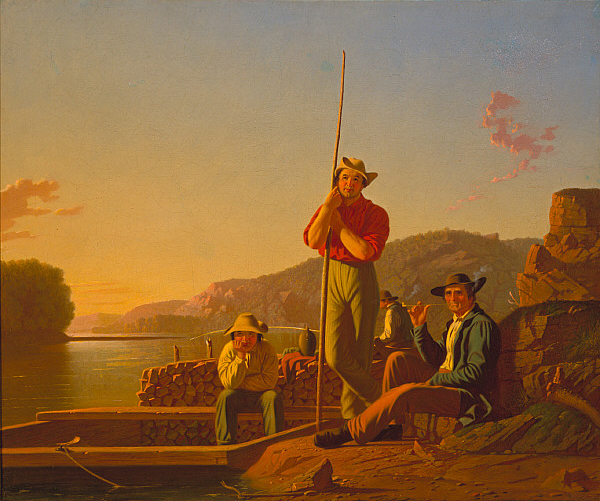
The Wood-boat, 1850

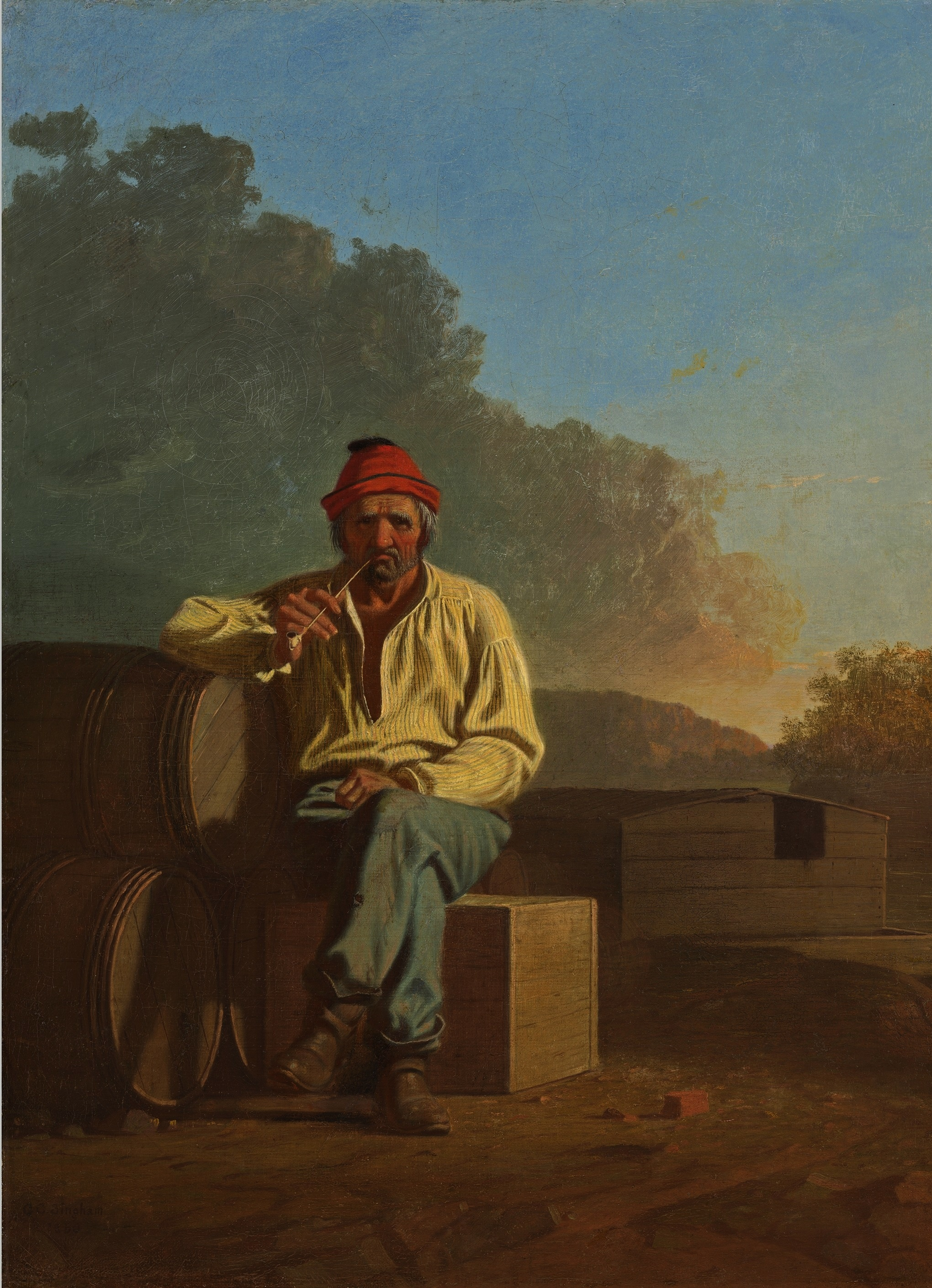
Mississippi Boatman, 1850

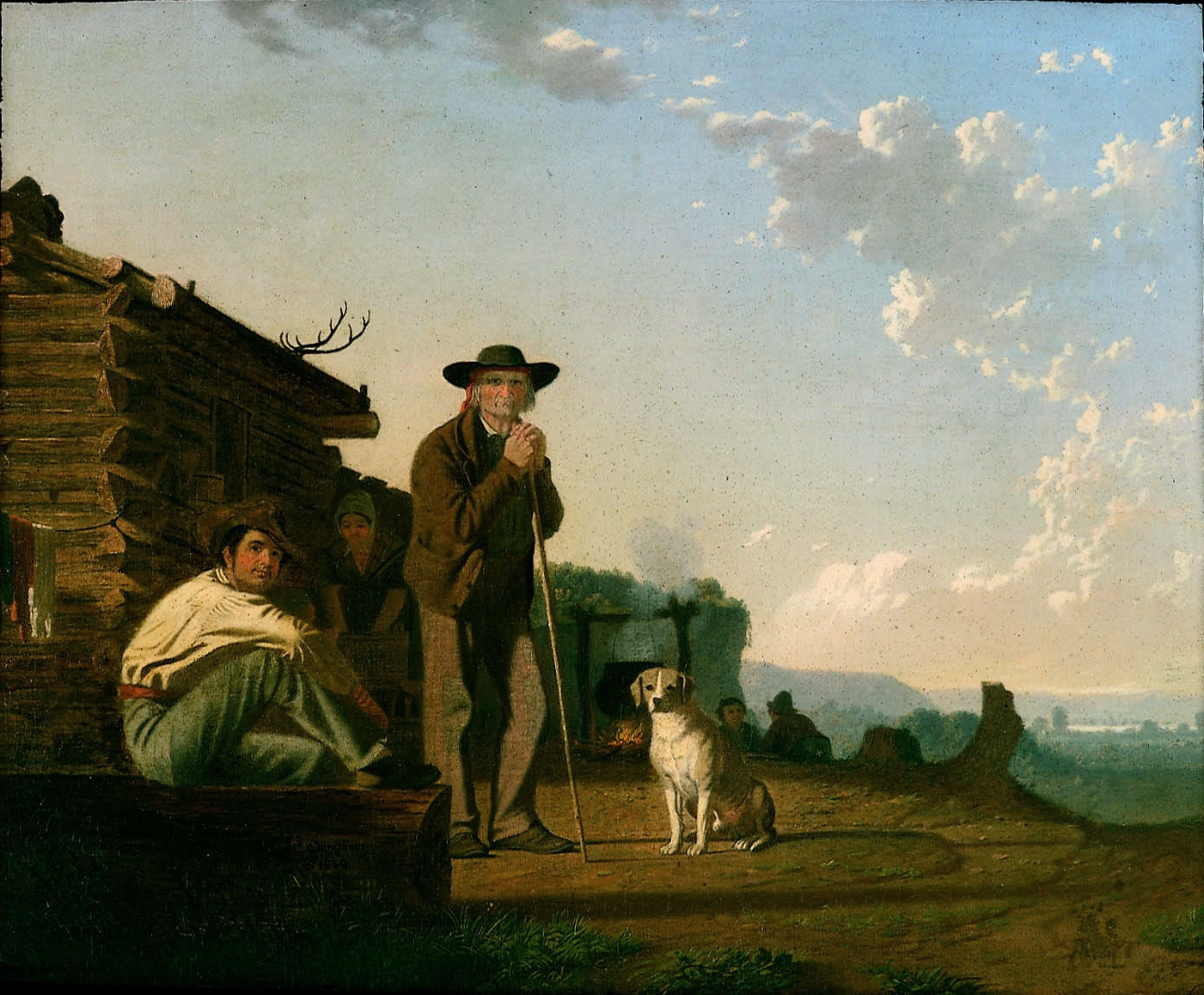
The Squatters, 1850

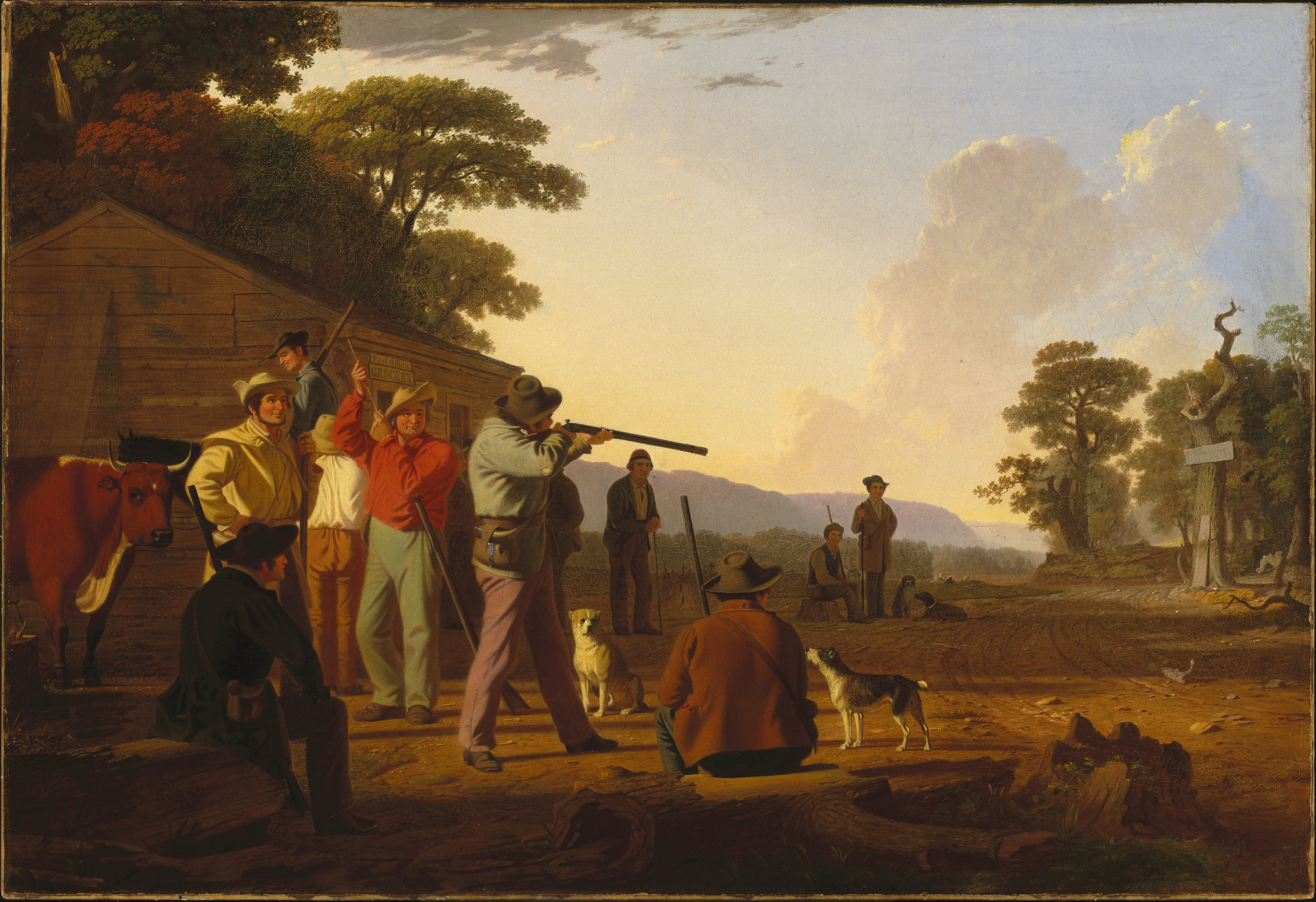
Shooting for the Beef, c. 1850

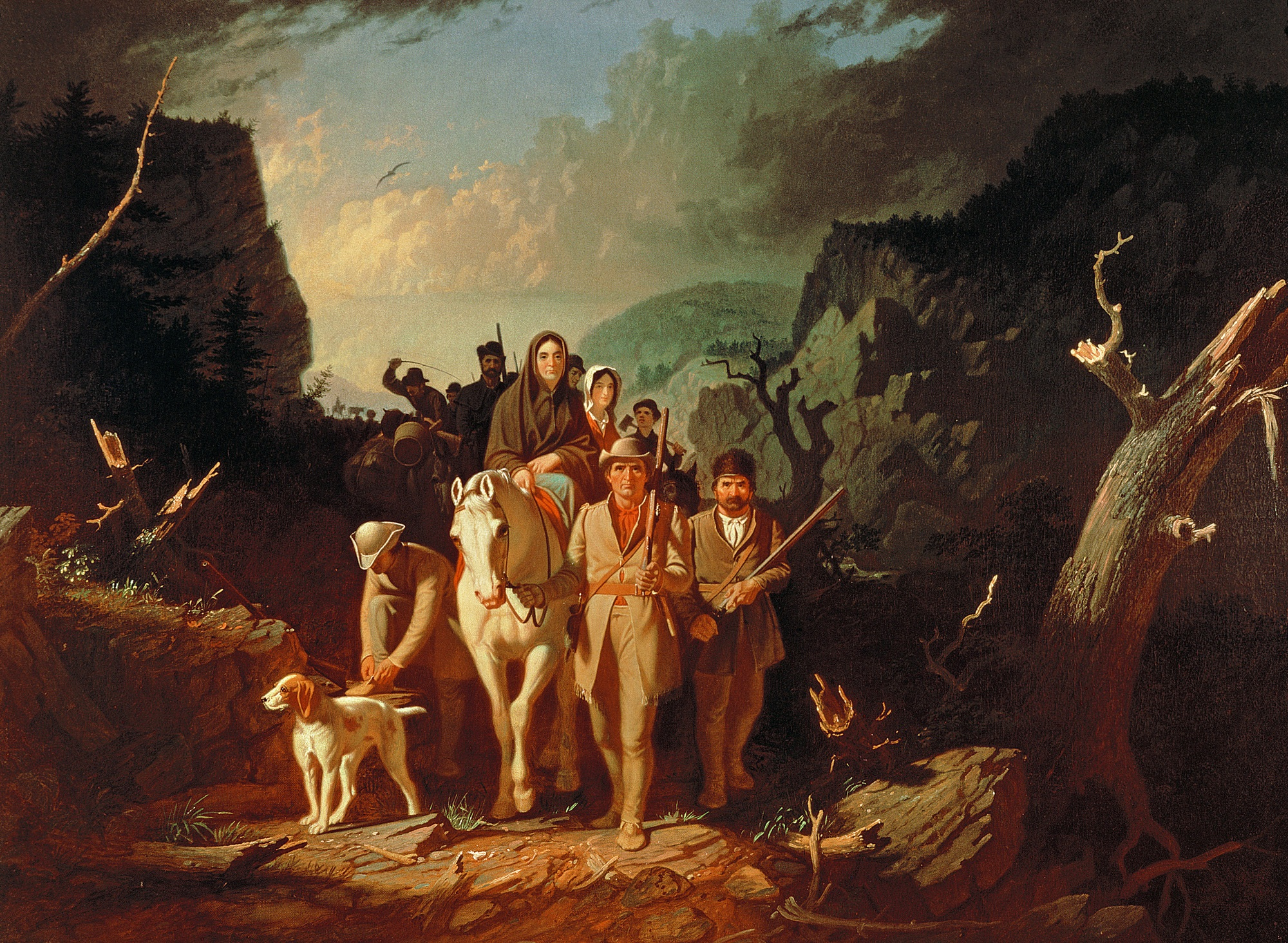
Daniel Boone Escorting Settlers through the Cumberland Gap, 1851–52

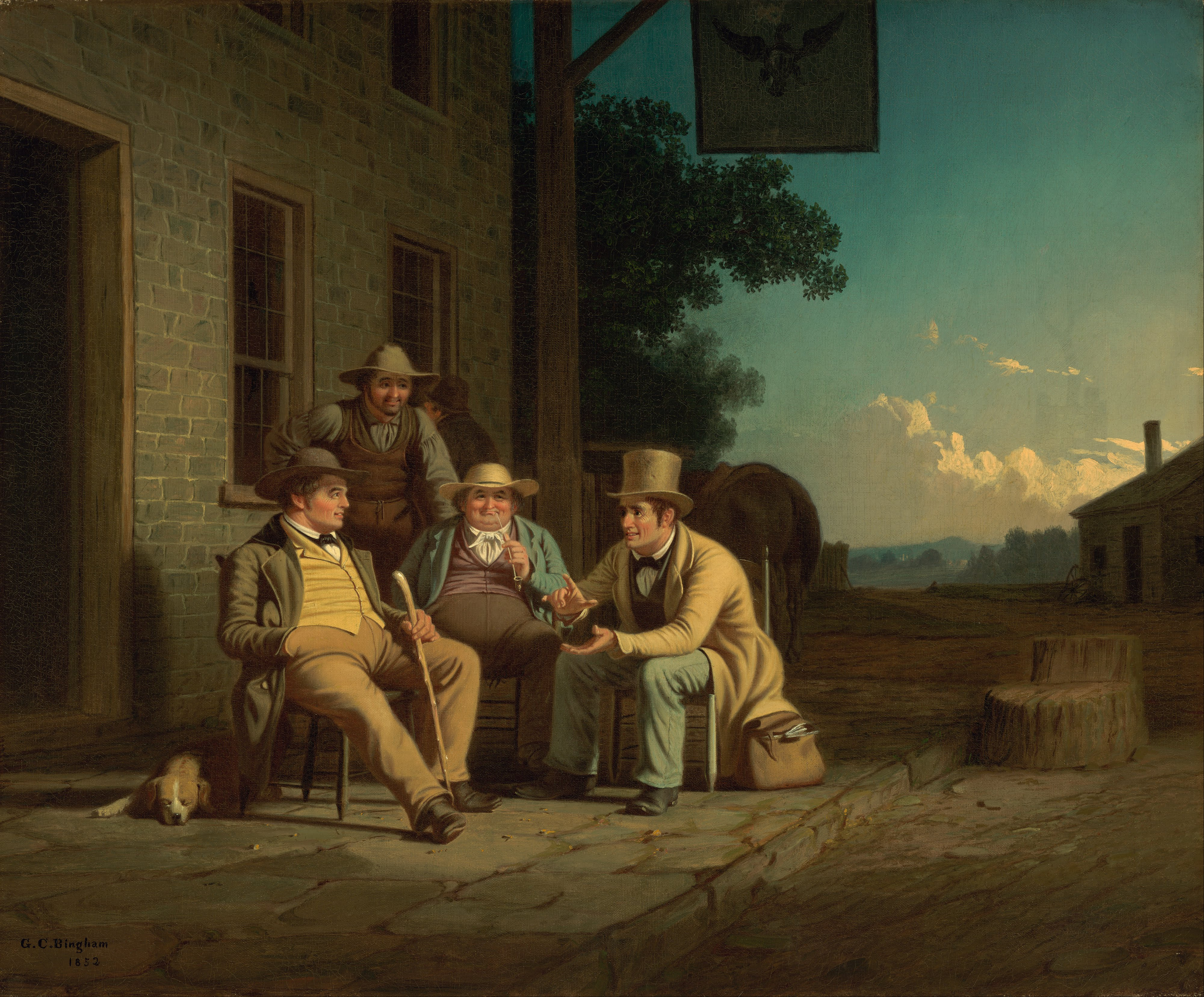
Canvassing for a Vote, 1852

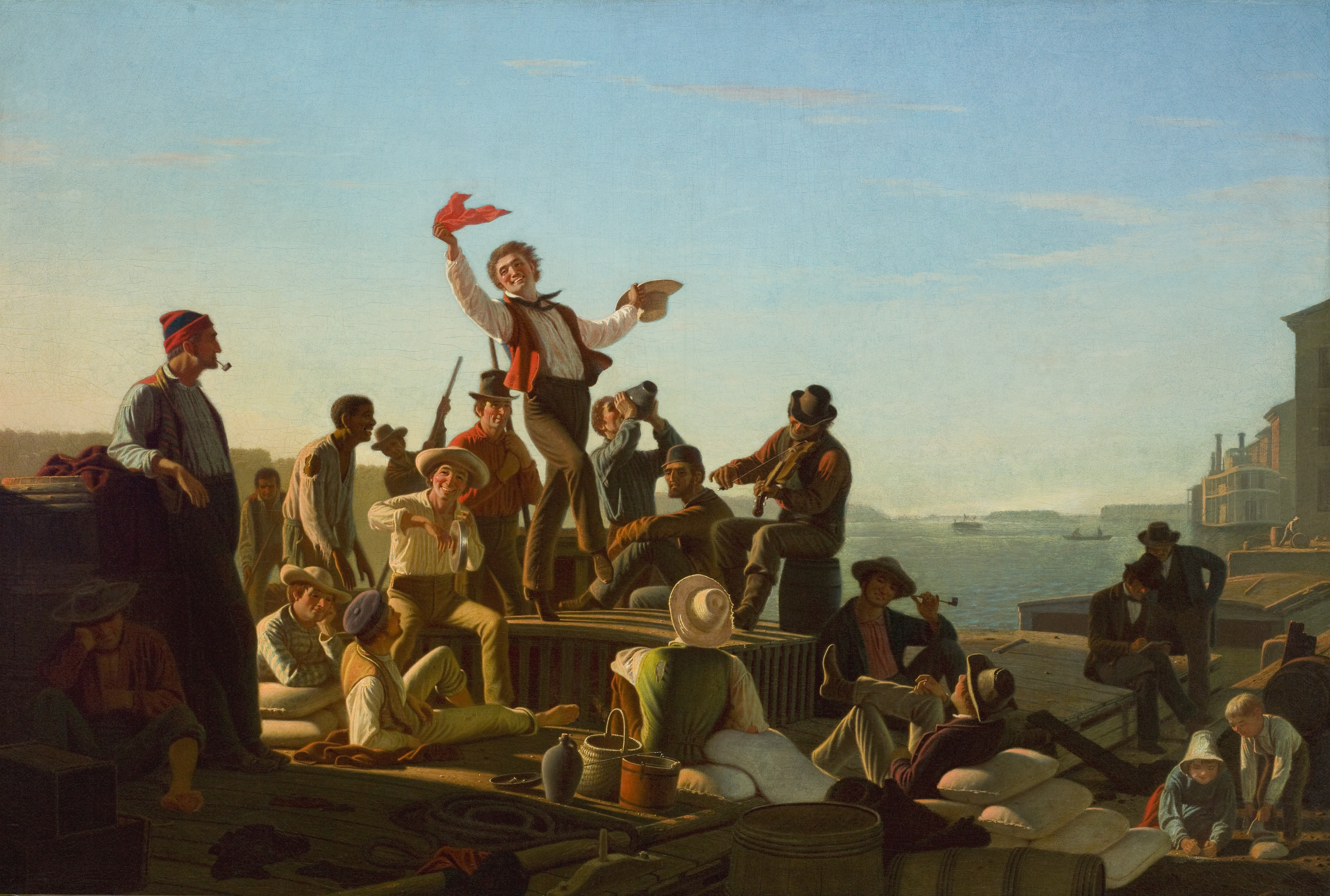
Jolly Flatboatmen in Port, 1857

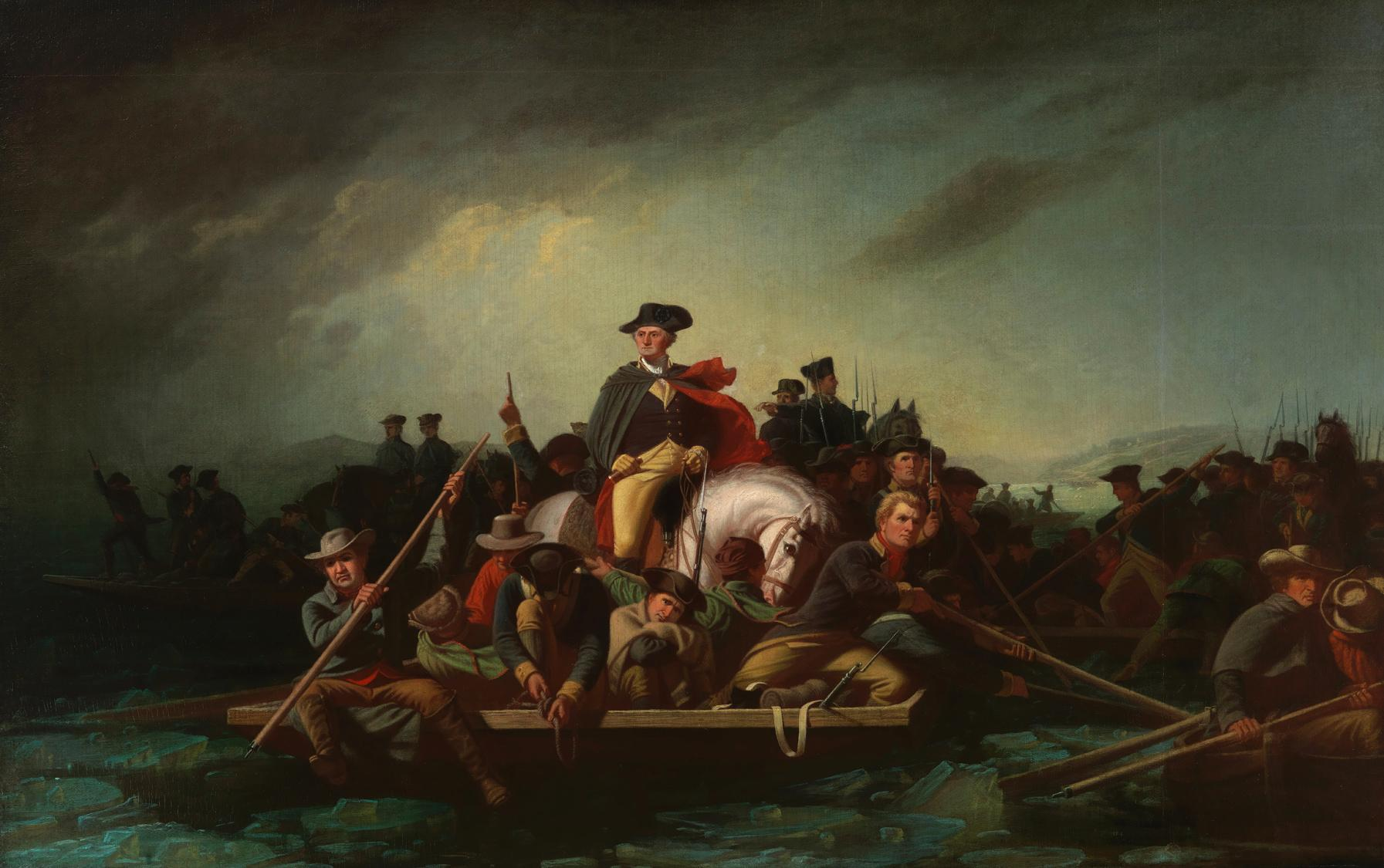
Washington Crossing the Delaware, 1856–1871

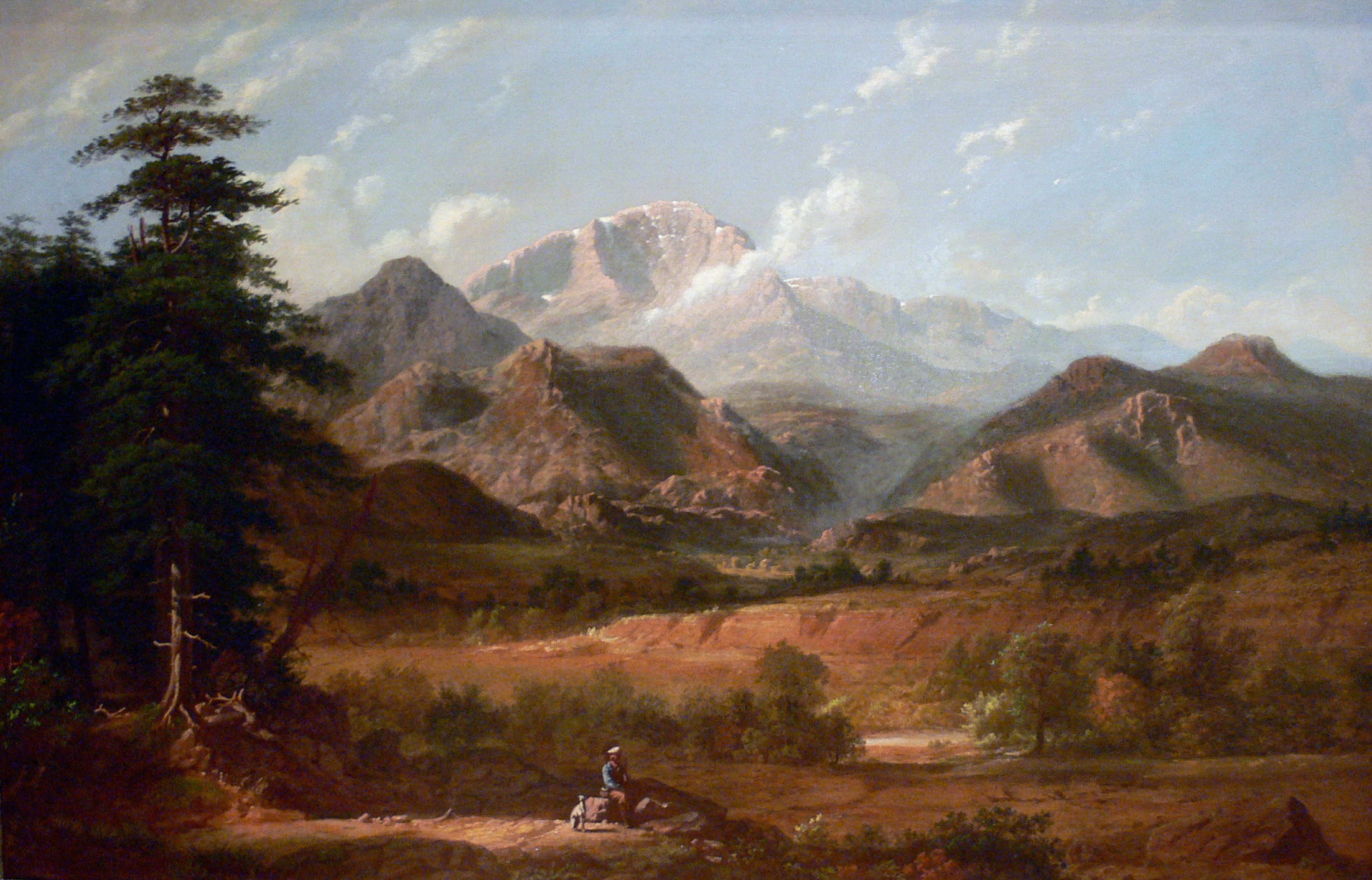
View of Pikes Peak, 1872

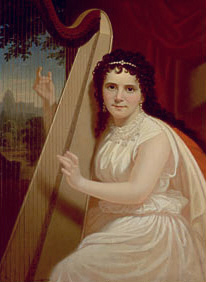
Portrait of Vinnie Ream, 1876

== Works ==
- 1834 – Self Portrait, 1834–35, oil on canvas, Saint Louis Art Museum, St. Louis, MO
- 1837 – General Richard Gentry, oil on canvas, Saint Louis Art Museum, St. Louis, MO
- 1838 – Judge Henry Lewis, 1838–39, oil on canvas, Saint Louis Art Museum, St. Louis, MO
- 1838 – Mrs. Henry Lewis (Elizabeth Morton Woodson), 1838–39, oil on canvas, Saint Louis Art Museum, St. Louis, MO
- 1843 – The Dull Story, 1843–1844, oil on canvas, Saint Louis Art Museum, St. Louis, MO
- 1845 – Cottage Scenery, oil on canvas, Corcoran Gallery of Art, Washington, D.C.
- 1846 – Jolly Flatboatmen, oil on canvas, Saint Louis Art Museum, St. Louis, MO
- 1846 – Landscape with Cattle, oil on canvas, Saint Louis Art Museum, St. Louis, MO
- 1846 – Lighter Relieving the Steamboat Aground, 1846–47, oil on canvas
- 1847 – Raftsmen Playing Cards, oil on canvas, Saint Louis Art Museum, St. Louis, MO
- 1848 – The Student (Dr. Oscar Fitzland Potter), oil on canvas, Saint Louis Art Museum, St. Louis, MO
- 1850 – Mississippi Boatman, oil on canvas, National Gallery of Art, Washington, D.C.
- 1850 – The Wood-boat, oil on canvas mounted on board, Saint Louis Art Museum, St. Louis, MO
- 1850 – Shooting for the Beef, c. 1850, oil on canvas, Brooklyn Museum, New York City
- 1851 – Daniel Boone Escorting Settlers through the Cumberland Gap, oil on canvas, 1851–52
- 1852 – The County Election, oil on canvas, Saint Louis Art Museum, St. Louis, MO
- 1852 – Canvassing for a Vote, oil on canvas, Nelson-Atkins Museum, Kansas City, MO
- 1853 – Stump Speaking, 1853–54, oil on canvas, Saint Louis Art Museum, St. Louis, MO
- 1854 – The Verdict of the People, 1854–55, oil on canvas, Saint Louis Art Museum, St. Louis, MO
- 1856 – Old Field Horse, oil on canvas, Saint Louis Art Museum, St. Louis, MO
- 1856 – The Belated Wayfarers, oil on canvas, Saint Louis Art Museum, St. Louis, MO
- 1856 – Washington Crossing the Delaware, 1856–71, oil on canvas
- 1857 – Jolly Flatboatmen in Port, oil on canvas, Saint Louis Art Museum, St. Louis, MO
- 1868 – Order No. 11, 1868, oil on canvas
- 1872 – View of Pikes Peak, oil on canvas
- 1876 – Portrait of Vinnie Ream (Vinnie Ream), oil on canvas

== See also ==
- George Caleb Bingham House

Political offices
Preceded by Alfred William Morrison	Missouri State Treasurer; 1862–1865	Succeeded by William Bishop
