= Alfred W. Morrison House =

Historic house in Missouri, United States

- U.S. National Register of Historic Places
- Location within Missouri Location within the United States
- Location: 1 mile (1.6 km) southwest of Fayette on MO 5, Fayette, Missouri
- Coordinates: 39°8′3″N 92°41′36″W
- Area: 3.7 acres (1.5 ha)
- Built: c. 1830
- Architectural style: Federal
- NRHP reference No.: 69000105
- Added to NRHP: April 16, 1969

Alfred W. Morrison House, also known as Lilac Hill, is a historic home located near Fayette, Howard County, Missouri. Built about 1830 as the main residence of a forced-labor farm, it is a 2 1/2-story, Federal-style brick dwelling with flanking 1 1/2-story wings.

The house was built by people enslaved by Alfred William Morris, who came to Missouri from Kentucky in 1821 and began buying land in Howard County, eventually owning about 1,600 to 1,700 acres.

Also on the property is a contributing slave cabin of wood-frame construction.

It was listed on the National Register of Historic Places in 1969.
