= The Verdict of the People =

1854 painting by George Caleb Bingham

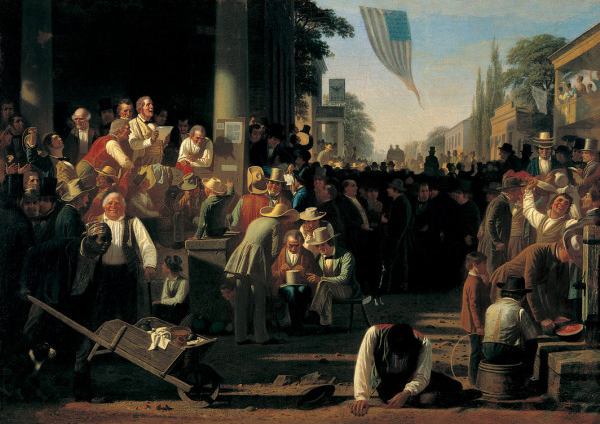
- Artist: George Caleb Bingham
- Year: 1854
- Medium: Oil on canvas
- Dimensions: 74 cm × 93 cm (29 in × 36.5 in)
- Location: Saint Louis Art Museum, St. Louis, Missouri

The Verdict of the People is an 1854 painting by George Caleb Bingham, currently owned by the Saint Louis Art Museum.

The last painting of Bingham's Election Series, The Verdict of the People tells the end of the story represented in the series. Within this painting, Bingham hid several political motives and ideas similar to the rest of the Election Series. Historians say the painting depicts public reaction to a likely proslavery candidate's election victory.

Completed in 1854, the work covered issues of slavery, temperance, and a representative government, subjects that had gone from a local to a national level. During the early 1850s, the temperance movement grew and more states were abolishing alcohol. A book by Heman Humphrey, titled Parallel between Intemperance and Slavery, associated the cause of anti-slavery to that of temperance. Bingham showed his view on intemperance and slavery by painting a banner that said, "Freedom for Virtue[,] Restriction for Vice." The banner referred to temperance by saying that the vice and alcohol would need to be restricted for the people to be free. The banner then references Bingham's ideas of slavery by using the connection of the temperance movement and the anti-slavery movement to show that Bingham thought negatively about slavery and shared that view with intemperance.

When Donald Trump was inaugurated as the 45th president of the United States on Jan. 20, 2017, The Verdict of the People was the chosen painting, hanging on a partition wall behind the ceremonial head table in the United States Capitol's National Statuary Hall.
