= Stephen W. Dorsey =

American politician

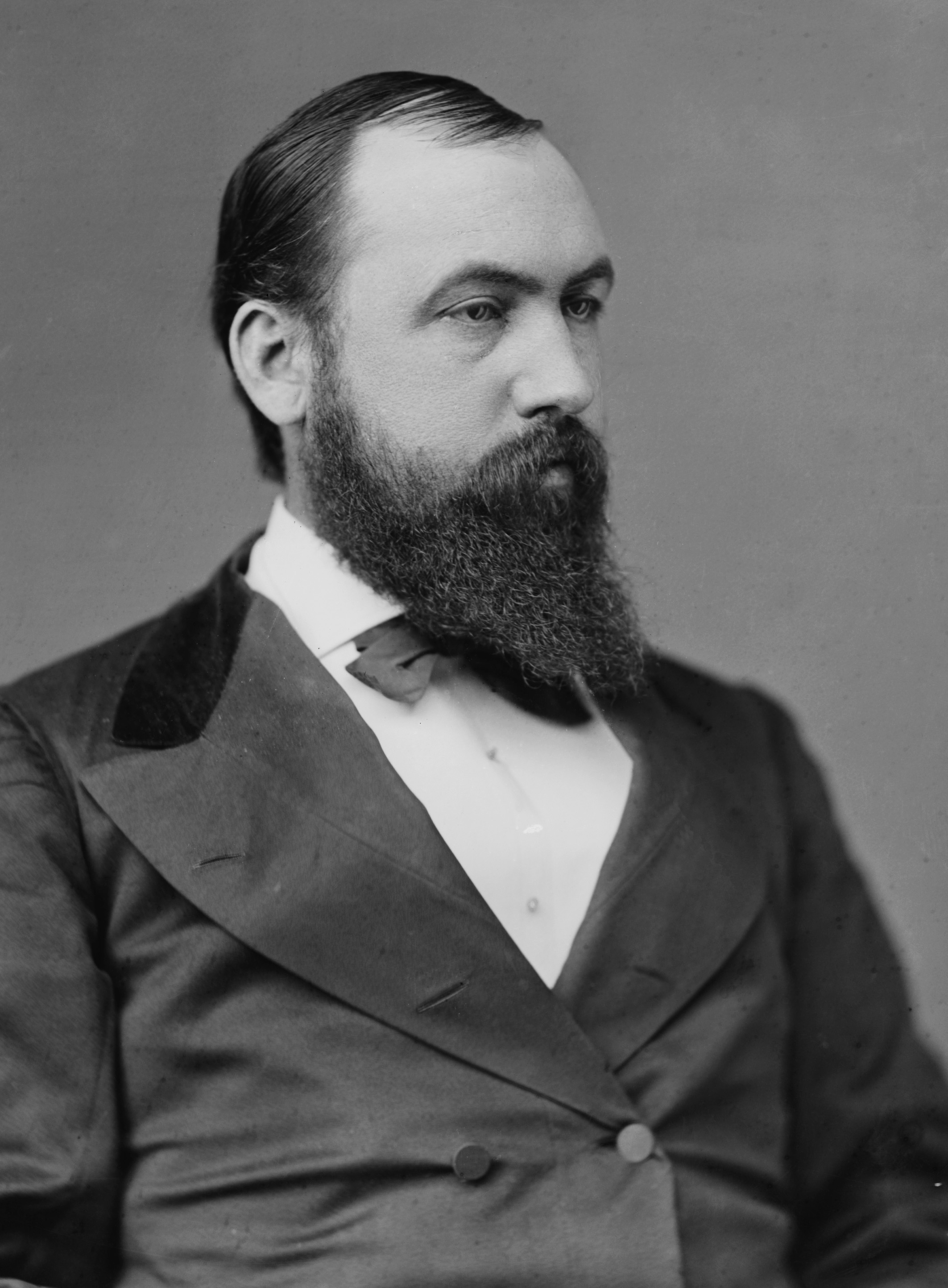

United States Senator from Arkansas
- In office March 4, 1873 – March 3, 1879
- Preceded by: Benjamin F. Rice
- Succeeded by: James D. Walker

Personal details
- Born: February 28, 1842 Benson, Vermont
- Died: March 20, 1916 (aged 74) Los Angeles, California
- Resting place: Fairmount Cemetery in Denver, Colorado
- Party: Republican

Stephen Wallace Dorsey (February 28, 1842 – March 20, 1916) was a Republican politician who represented Arkansas in the United States Senate from 1873 to 1879, during the Reconstruction era.

He was born in Benson in Rutland County, Vermont, and subsequently moved to Oberlin, Ohio, where he attended public schools.

In 1861, he joined the 1st Ohio Light Artillery of the Union Army as a private during the American Civil War. By the end of the war, he became a colonel. After the war he returned to Ohio and settled in Sandusky where he was employed by the Sandusky Tool Company and subsequently became its president. Named president of the Arkansas Railway Company, he relocated to Helena, Arkansas.

He was elected as a senator from Arkansas on March 3, 1873. He was a chairman of the Committee on District of Columbia (Forty-fifth Congress).

Less than a year prior to the outbreak of the Brooks-Baxter War, a conflict over the governorship of Arkansas, Dorsey initially supported Governor Elisha Baxter. However, he, along with the majority of the state's carpetbagger Republicans, often called “Mistrals”, later shifted allegiance to Brooks's claim. During this tumultuous period, Congressman Jasper D. Ward from Illinois visited Arkansas to evaluate the situation on behalf of the Poland Committee. Ward was hosted by Dorsey, who played a pivotal role in ensuring that Ward's report favored the reinstatement of Brooks as governor. Despite these efforts, the attempt proved ultimately unsuccessful. The Democratic Party gained complete control of the state assembly with the adoption of the new 1874 Arkansas Constitution and the election of Augustus Garland, leading to Dorsey not seeking reelection in 1879.

In 1880, when the Republicans nominated James A. Garfield for U.S. President and Chester A. Arthur for vice president, Dorsey became the secretary of the Republican National Committee. His reputation was tarnished, though, by the Star route scandal, in which Dorsey and his partners were accused of defrauding the government of $412,000. Dorsey was defended by noted criminal law attorney Robert G. Ingersoll. Though he was found not guilty, the cost of his defense and the damage to his reputation all but destroyed Dorsey's political and financial ambitions.

In 1876, he was made a member of the Republican National Committee. In 1878, he built the Dorsey Mansion in New Mexico.

After Dorsey, no other Republican served as a senator from Arkansas until Tim Hutchinson in 1997, and no other Republican served in the state's Class 3 Senate seat until John Boozman in 2011.

He engaged in cattle raising and mining in New Mexico and Colorado and subsequently moved to Los Angeles, California, where he resided until his death in 1916. He is interred at Fairmount Cemetery in Denver, Colorado.

The town of Clayton, New Mexico, is named for a son of Senator Dorsey.

== See also ==
- List of federal political scandals in the United States

U.S. Senate
Preceded by Benjamin F. Rice	U.S. senator (Class 3) from Arkansas; 1873–1879; Served alongside: Powell Clayton, Augustus H. Garland	Succeeded by James D. Walker
