= Fort Osage Township, Jackson County, Missouri =

Inactive township in the US state of Missouri

Coordinates: 39°08′35″N 94°12′31″W

Fort Osage Township is an inactive township in Jackson County, in the U.S. state of Missouri.

Fort Osage Township was established in 1827, taking its name from Fort Osage.

The township included a small northeastern sector of Jackson County along the Missouri River across from Ray County, with settlements of Buckner, Sibley, Levasy, Lake City, and Blue Mills. An atlas showing the townships of Jackson County in 1930 is on page 2 at

- (Jackson County, circa 1930): https://web.archive.org/web/20180912112150/http://cdm.sos.mo.gov/cdm/ref/collection/moplatbooks/id/1537
