= James D. Walker =

American politician (1830–1906)

James David Walker
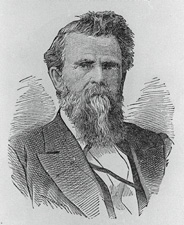

United States Senator from Arkansas
- In office March 4, 1879 – March 3, 1885
- Preceded by: Stephen W. Dorsey
- Succeeded by: James K. Jones

Personal details
- Born: December 13, 1830 Russellville, Kentucky
- Died: October 17, 1906 (aged 75) Fayetteville, Arkansas
- Party: Democratic
- Relatives: David Walker (cousin)

James David Walker (December 13, 1830 – October 17, 1906) was an attorney and Democratic Party politician from Arkansas who represented the state in the U.S. Senate from 1879 to 1885. Two of his uncles likewise served in Congress, as Finis McLean served Kentucky in the House of Representatives and John McLean represented Illinois in both the House and Senate.

== Early life and education ==
Walker was born near Russellville, Kentucky on December 13, 1830, to a planter family; he attended private schools in Kentucky. His parents sent him to the Ozark Institute and Arkansas College, both in Fayetteville, Arkansas.

His family moved permanently to Arkansas in 1847. That year at the age of 17, Walker began the study of law as a legal apprentice to an existing firm.

== Career ==
On his admittance to the bar in 1850, Walker began practicing law in Fayetteville. He was elected as a circuit court judge in the fourth judicial district, where he served for a time.

Upon the outbreak of the Civil War, Walker was commissioned as a colonel of the 4th Regiment, Arkansas State Troops. Captured at Oak Hills in 1861, he was held as a prisoner of war for two years.

In 1865 he resumed his practice in Fayetteville, and was appointed as Solicitor General of the state. He served as a Democratic elector for the 1876 election, after white Democrats had regained control of the state legislature following the Reconstruction era.

The legislature elected Walker to the US Senate in 1878. He defeated Robert Ward Johnson (1814–1879), a former Congressman and Senator who had been prominent in state politics before the Civil War. He was part of the political coalition known as "The Family," which had dominated Arkansas politics before the war.

Walker served from 1879 to 1885. His personal secretary was Elias Cornelius Boudinot, a Cherokee attorney and politician from Arkansas who had lobbied for railroad construction in the West. Walker supported his bid in 1885 for appointment as Commissioner of Indian Affairs, but another man was selected. Walker declined to run for reelection in 1884 and returned to Arkansas at the end of his term.

== Later years ==
He resumed his law practice in Fayetteville. He died there on October 17, 1906, and is buried in the city.

U.S. Senate
Preceded by Stephen W. Dorsey	U.S. senator (Class 3) from Arkansas; 1879–1885; Served alongside: Augustus H. Garland	Succeeded by James K. Jones
