= List of elections in 1840 =

The following elections occurred in the year 1840.

== North America ==
=== United States ===
- 1840 United States elections

==== United States Presidential ====
- 1840 United States presidential election

==== United States Senate ====
- 1840 and 1841 United States Senate elections
- United States Senate election in New York, 1839/1840
- United States Senate special election in Pennsylvania, 1840

==== United States House of Representatives ====
- 1840 and 1841 United States House of Representatives elections

==== United States lieutenant gubernatorial ====
- 1840 Connecticut lieutenant gubernatorial election
- 1840 Missouri lieutenant gubernatorial election

==== United States gubernatorial ====
- 1840 Arkansas gubernatorial election
- 1840 Connecticut gubernatorial election
- 1840 Delaware gubernatorial election
- 1840 Indiana gubernatorial election
- 1840 Kentucky gubernatorial election
- 1840 Maine gubernatorial election
- 1840 Massachusetts gubernatorial election
- 1840 Missouri gubernatorial election
- 1840 New Hampshire gubernatorial election
- 1840 New Jersey gubernatorial election
- 1840 New York gubernatorial election
- 1840 North Carolina gubernatorial election
- 1840 Ohio gubernatorial election
- 1840 Rhode Island gubernatorial election
- 1840 South Carolina gubernatorial election
- 1840 Vermont gubernatorial election
- 1840 Virginia gubernatorial election

==== United States mayoral elections ====
- 1840 Boston mayoral election
- 1840 Chicago mayoral election
- 1840 Philadelphia mayoral election

== See also ==
- Category:1840 elections
