= Moon Princess =

Moon Princess, Lunar Princess, or Princess of the Moon may refer to:

== Characters ==
- Princess Kaguya, the protagonist of The Tale of the Bamboo Cutter
- Maria Merryweather, the protagonist of the novel The Little White Horse
- Sailor Moon (character), the protagonist and titular character of the manga series Sailor Moon
- Dianna Soreil, a character in the anime television series Turn A Gundam
- Aida Surugan, a character in the anime television series Gundam Reconguista in G
- Arcueid Brunestud, the title character of the visual novel Tsukihime
- Feena Fam Earthlight, a character in the visual novel Yoake Mae yori Ruriiro na
- Princess Luna (My Little Pony), a character in the animated television series My Little Pony: Friendship Is Magic

== Works ==
- The Princess of the Moon: A Confederate Fairy Story, an 1869 novel by Cora Semmes Ives
- Princess from the Moon, a 1987 film by Kon Ichikawa
- Tsukihime, a 2000 visual novel by Type-Moon
