= John William Clark Watson =

American politician (1808–1890)

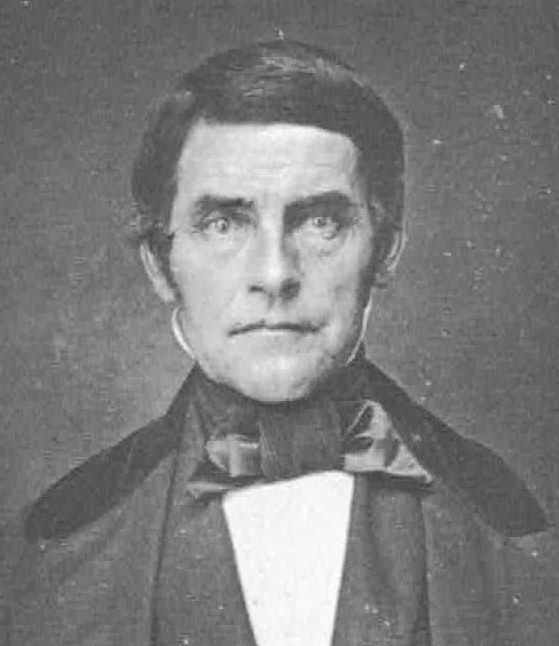
- Photograph of Watson, c. 1855

Confederate States Senator from Mississippi
- In office February 17, 1864 – May 10, 1865
- Preceded by: James Phelan
- Succeeded by: Constituency abolished

Personal details
- Born: John William Clark Watson; February 27, 1808 Albemarle County, Virginia, US
- Died: September 24, 1890 (aged 82) Holly Springs, Mississippi, US
- Party: Whig prior to Civil War. Democratic after Civil War.
- Education: University of Virginia

John William Clark Watson (February 27, 1808 – September 24, 1890) was an American politician who served as a Confederate States Senator from Mississippi from 1864 to 1865.

== Biography ==
Watson was born on February 27, 1808 in Albemarle County, Virginia and graduated from the University of Virginia law school in 1830. In 1845 he moved to Holly Springs, Mississippi and established a law practice with Jeremiah Watkins Clapp.

Watson was a Whig and a supporter of the Union as sectional tensions rose prior to the American Civil War. He unsuccessfully stood as an anti-secession delegate to the Mississippi state secession convention which convened in January, 1861. However, once his state left the Union, Watson supported the Confederacy and was selected as a Confederate Senator in 1863, replacing the unpopular James Phelan Sr..

After the war, Watson was appointed as a circuit judge by Governor John Marshall Stone in 1876, serving until 1882. Returning to the practice of law, he represented the state in the 1885 Railroad Commission Cases before the Supreme Court of the United States, which upheld the constitutionality of rate-setting by the state railroad commission.

In his later years, Watson was an eager supporter of the growing prohibition movement. He died on September 24, 1890 at Holly Springs.

Confederate States Senate
Preceded by James Phelan	Confederate States Senator (Class 1) from Mississippi; 1864–1865; Served alongside: Albert Brown	Constituency abolished
