= John Bullock Clark =

American militia officer and politician (1802–1885)

John Clark
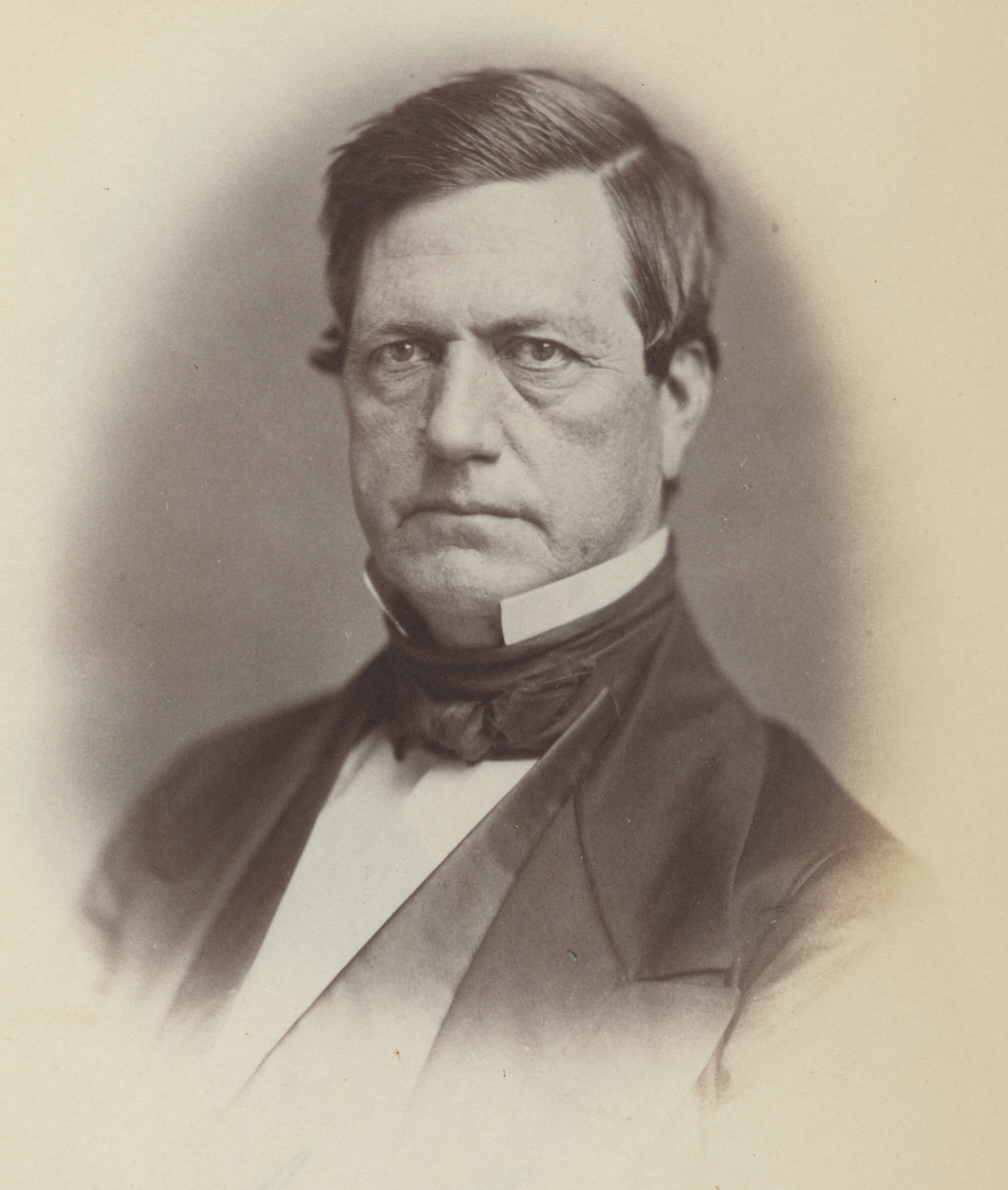
- Clark photographed in 1859

Member of the Confederate States House of Representatives from Missouri's 3rd district
- In office June 10, 1864 – March 18, 1865
- Preceded by: Caspar Bell
- Succeeded by: Constituency abolished

Confederate States Senator from Missouri
- In office February 18, 1862 – February 17, 1864
- Preceded by: Constituency established
- Succeeded by: George Graham Vest

Member of the U.S. House of Representatives from Missouri's 3rd district
- In office December 7, 1857 – July 13, 1861
- Preceded by: James S. Green
- Succeeded by: William Augustus Hall

Member of the Missouri House of Representatives
- In office 1850–1851

Personal details
- Born: April 17, 1802 Madison County, Kentucky, U.S.
- Died: October 29, 1885 (aged 83) Fayette, Missouri, U.S.
- Party: Whig; Democratic
- Children: John Bullock Clark Jr.
- Relatives: James Clark; Christopher Henderson Clark

Military service
- Allegiance: Missouri (pre-1861); Missouri State Guard (1861)
- Rank: Major general (Missouri militia); Brigadier general (Missouri State Guard)
- Commands: 3rd Division, Missouri State Guard
- Battles/wars: Black Hawk War; 1838 Mormon War; American Civil War

John Bullock Clark Sr. (April 17, 1802 – October 29, 1885) was an American militia officer and politician who served as a member of the United States Congress and Confederate Congress. Born in Kentucky, Clark moved with his family to the Missouri Territory in 1818 and studied law. After Missouri's statehood in 1821, he opened a legal practice in Fayette, Missouri, in 1824, and held several positions in the local government in the 1820s and 1830s. Clark was also involved in the state militia, serving as a colonel in the Black Hawk War in 1832 and eventually rising to the rank of major general. In 1838, during the Missouri Mormon War, Clark was the recipient of Governor Lilburn Boggs's infamous Mormon Extermination Order, and was involved in the ending stages of the conflict. He was the Whig candidate in the 1840 Missouri gubernatorial election. Clark was accused of conspiring to commit electoral fraud in the election and as a result almost fought a duel with Claiborne Fox Jackson, later a Governor of Missouri.

In 1850, Clark was elected as a Whig to the Missouri House of Representatives and served into 1851. He was elected in 1857 to fill a vacancy in one of Missouri's seats in the United States House of Representatives. With the outbreak of the Civil War in 1861, Clark, a wealthy owner of 160 slaves, became a leading secessionist in Missouri. After the pro-secessionist Missouri State Guard (MSG) was formed in May 1861, he was appointed by Jackson as a brigadier general commanding the MSG's 3rd Division. After leading his troops against Federal forces in the Battle of Carthage, Missouri on July 5, Clark was expelled from the House of Representatives for fighting against the United States. On August 10, he led his division in the Battle of Wilson's Creek, in which he was wounded.

After being appointed as a delegate to the Provisional Confederate Congress by the Confederate government of Missouri late in 1861, Clark resigned his military commission. He was appointed to the Confederate States Senate for the First Confederate Congress, serving from February 1862 to February 1864. During his time in that body, he opposed the Jefferson Davis administration on some issues, but supported it on others. Confederate Governor of Missouri Thomas Caute Reynolds did not appoint him to a second senate term due to allegations of alcoholism, mendacity, and womanizing. After defeating Caspar Wistar Bell in an election for the Confederate House of Representatives for the Second Confederate Congress, Clark served in that role until March 1865. After the defeat of the Confederacy, he fled to Mexico, but was arrested upon his return to Texas in late 1865. He was released after several months, and returned to Missouri in 1870, where he practiced law for the rest of his life. His son, John Bullock Clark Jr., was a general in the Confederate States Army and later served in the United States Congress.

== Early life and militia service ==
John Bullock Clark was born in Madison County, Kentucky, on April 17, 1802, the child of Bennett and Martha Clark. He was the nephew of James Clark, a governor of Kentucky, and Congressman Christopher Henderson Clark. Clark was educated in local schools. The family moved to the Missouri Territory in 1818, and Clark studied law. The author Kenneth E. Burchett notes that his legal knowledge was self-taught; He was admitted to the bar in 1824 while residing at Fayette, Missouri. The historian Bruce S. Allardice refers to him as "a born politician". He was taller than most of his peers at 6 feet 2 inches (1.88 m), and had a reputation as a storyteller. Clark developed a colorful reputation for his legal demeanor; he once, knowing the evidence was stacked against a client he was defending, had a man canvass the county with petitions expressing support or opposition for his client, until the local jury pool had been depleted. Clark was Howard County treasurer from 1823 to 1825, and clerk of the county's court system from 1824 to 1834. He was also a member of the Methodist Church; the historian Christopher Phillips describes him as devout. In 1826 he married Eleanor Turner. Their son, John Bullock Clark Jr. was born in 1831.

Clark was active in the Missouri militia. In 1832, he served as a colonel of the Missouri Mounted Volunteers during the Black Hawk War. From 1836 to 1838, Clark was a major general in the Missouri militia. On October 26, 1838, during the Missouri Mormon War, Clark was ordered by Governor of Missouri Lilburn Boggs to deploy state troops into Daviess County, Missouri, in response to claims of atrocities. (Note: LeSueur notes "random acts of violence occurred [by the Missourians] often enough to pose a threat to all Mormons", particularly the Haun's Mill massacre. He states claims of widespread destruction and murder are exaggerated, although an uptick in destruction did occur after the Mormons surrendered. The Mormons did engage in some looting; this was subsequently blamed on the Danites although others did engage in looting as well.) The next day, Boggs issued Clark the Mormon Extermination Order, which included the statement "The Mormons must be treated as enemies, and must be exterminated or driven from the State if necessary for the public peace". The order instructed Clark to move with a force of troops to Richmond, Missouri, and there "operate against the Mormons".

Clark was the only person to receive the order; he disseminated copies of it to the other relevant officers. After receiving the Extermination Order, Clark mobilized a force to take to Richmond. David Rice Atchison was already commanding Missouri troops in the field, but Boggs ordered Clark to take command over Atchison, who left the field. On November 1, the Mormons surrendered. Alexander William Doniphan refused orders to execute captured Mormon leaders on November 2; Mormon sources later claimed Clark had supported the idea of executing the Mormon leaders. Clark's 1,500-man column arrived in Richmond on November 3, and enforced the terms of the surrender. He investigated claims of atrocities committed during the conflict, particularly using information provided by Sampson Avard. As a result of his investigation, 50 Mormons were arrested. Clark then made a speech to local Mormon men, ordering them out of the state by early 1839. He warned them not to congregate in groups of more than four, or "the citizens [of Missouri] will be upon you and destroy you". The historian Stephen C. LeSueur describes Clark's speech as humiliating for the Mormons.

== United States political career ==
Politically, Clark was a Whig, and was the party's nominee for the 1840 Missouri gubernatorial election. The historian Perry McCandless describes Clark as "not a top leader" in the party. The Whigs were a minority in Missouri at this time, and the Democrats performed well against the Whigs in the state elections that year. During the election, Democratic newspapers spread claims that the Whigs had distributed false party ballots in parts of the state that substituted Clark for Thomas Reynolds, the Democratic candidate. The Democratic politician Claiborne Fox Jackson wrote a thinly pseudonymous letter accusing Clark of being complicit in the false ballots scheme. Jackson transcribed a letter (including deliberately reproducing a spelling error) purportedly sent between Clark and James H. Birch. The Democrats claimed the Clark letter had been found in a saddlebag and Clark claimed it had been stolen from his hat after he left it unattended. Enraged, Clark sent letters back and forth to Jackson using third parties; the exchange culminated in Clark challenging Jackson to a duel in mid-September. Jackson responded with terms that put Clark at a disadvantage and may have actually been a bluff. No duel occurred, and Clark's reputation in the state was damaged. Clark lost the election, 29,625 votes to 22,212. In 1848, Clark was again appointed a major general in the state militia, a rank he held until 1861.

Running as a Whig, Clark was elected to the Missouri House of Representatives in 1850, representing Howard County. In this election, he ran on a platform supporting states' rights and the Jackson Resolutions, a series of pro-slavery resolutions put forward by Jackson in 1849. Clark was considered for the Whig candidate for United States Senator that year, but his views were off-putting to moderate members of the party, who, in the words of McCandless, considered him the "most apt to disrupt the party and the Union"; the nomination went to Henry S. Geyer. Clark remained in office until 1851.

By 1857, Clark had switched allegiance from the Whigs to the Democrats due to his pro-slavery views. That year, he was elected to fill the vacant United States House of Representatives seat left by the resignation of James S. Green; being sworn in on December 7. He was reelected in 1858 and 1860. The 1859–1860 election for the Speaker of the United States House of Representatives was particularly contentious. A recent anti-slavery book by Hinton Rowan Helper titled The Impending Crisis of the South had been endorsed by 68 congressman from the Republican Party, and Clark proposed a resolution which would have prohibited those individuals from being elected as Speaker of the House. Clark additionally had a listing of those who had endorsed Hinton's book read aloud. Clark's proposed resolution added to the contentiousness of the Speaker's election, to the extent that during discussion over the resolution, one congressman from New York pulled a gun on another congressman.

By 1861, Clark was wealthy and owned 160 slaves. In April 1861, the Civil War began, with states seceding from the Union and forming the breakaway Confederate States of America. Clark was a leading Missouri secessionist. On May 10, the United States Army officer Nathaniel Lyon dispersed a pro-secessionist militia gathering outside of St. Louis, Missouri; a riot occurred when he took his prisoners through the St. Louis streets. The Missouri state government responded by creating a pro-secession militia organization known as the Missouri State Guard (MSG).

== Confederate service ==
=== Missouri State Guard ===
A map of the divisions of the Missouri State Guard. Clark commanded the 3rd Division in north-central Missouri.

Jackson, who was now Missouri's governor, appointed Clark to command the 3rd Division of the MSG, which was located in the north-central part of the state. The appointment carried with it the rank of brigadier general. Overall command of the MSG went to Sterling Price. Jackson and Price expected an offensive against the MSG by Lyon. Determining that the state capital of Jefferson City could not be held, they selected Boonville as the place to make a stand. Clark was ordered there with his division. After Price had to relinquish command due to a case of severe diarrhea on June 13, Clark briefly commanded MSG forces at Boonville until Jackson and his relative Colonel John Sappington Marmaduke formed a joint command. Lyon attacked on June 17 and routed the MSG force in the Battle of Boonville.

Clark was at Carthage with Jackson and several divisions of the MSG by July 5. That day, he led his division in action against a Federal force commanded by Colonel Franz Sigel. The Battle of Carthage, Missouri, was a minor affair in which Sigel's troops were driven from the field with little loss to either side. On July 13, Clark was expelled from his congressional seat, for fighting against the United States, with an emphasis placed on his leading troops at Carthage. The House of Representatives voted 94 to 45 to expel him. He was replaced by William Augustus Hall. Price consolidated MSG forces at Cassville beginning on July 25, and on July 29, the MSG began directly cooperating with a Confederate States Army force led by Brigadier General Ben McCulloch. An action of Clark's increased McCulloch's distrust of the MSG troops. A large number of men in Clark's division were unarmed. Believing the unarmed men to be a waste of supplies, McCulloch wanted Clark to send them home, but Clark refused; McCulloch had no direct authority to order Clark to disperse the men.

Significant sites in Clark's Civil War service

In early August, the combined Confederate and MSG commands moved to a camp along Wilson's Creek. Lyon had moved his army to Springfield, and Price wanted to attack. McCulloch demurred, but late on April 9, Price, backed by Clark and other MSG officers, pushed for an attack. McCulloch agreed to schedule one for the following morning after Price threatened to take command and lead an offensive himself. Instead, Lyon attacked early on the morning on April 10, catching the Confederates and MSG by surprise and beginning the Battle of Wilson's Creek. Once Price learned of the attack, he ordered Clark's division, along with those of William Y. Slack, James H. McBride, and Mosby Monroe Parsons, to bring up their infantry and artillery. Clark later tried to order the cavalry portion of his division to support his infantry, but the cavalry became greatly disorganized by Union artillery fire and the few who entered the fighting at this time instead fought with McBride's men or the South Kansas-Texas Mounted Volunteers, as they were able to locate them in the chaos of battle quicker than Clark's men. After the battle, McCulloch praised Clark in his after-action report. Clark was wounded in the leg during the battle. He resigned his commission in the MSG on December 6.

=== Confederate Congress and later life ===
In October, Jackson and the deposed secessionist government voted to secede and join the Confederacy as the Confederate government of Missouri. This government appointed Clark as a delegate to the Provisional Confederate Congress, in which he served from December 7, 1861, to February 17, 1862. During this time span, Clark was on the Foreign Affairs and Indian Affairs congressional committees. In the First Confederate Congress, Missouri received seven seats in the Confederate House of Representatives and two in the Confederate States Senate. The historians Ezra J. Warner and W. Buck Yearns describe the members of this Missouri delegation as "congress[men] without a constituency". Clark was selected to be one of the two senators. The other Missouri senator was Robert L. Y. Peyton. One of the senators was to receive a four-year term, and the other a two-year term. Clark received the shorter term by lot. The First Confederate Congress was in session from February 18, 1862, to February 17, 1864, and Clark was in office for the entirety of that time span.

As a senator, Clark served on the Foreign Affairs, Indian Affairs, Post Offices & Post Roads, Printing, Public Lands, and Territories committees. He was the chairman of the Public Lands committee. Clark supported regional interests for the western portion of the Confederacy while in office. He sought to halt conscription in areas threatened by Federal forces, and supported the creation of partisan ranger units. While he usually opposed providing Confederate president Jefferson Davis with appointive powers, Clark generally voted pro-administration on matters that did not affect his region. He supported a stronger prosecution of the war. Davis viewed Clark as an enemy due to the times he opposed Davis's positions. At the end of his term, Confederate Governor of Missouri Thomas Caute Reynolds (Note: A different Thomas Reynolds than Clark's 1840 gubernatorial opponent.) did not re-appoint Clark to the Senate. By this time, the authority of the Confederate government of Missouri had waned to the extent that Warner and Yearns describe Reynolds's authority as extending "just so far as the spot upon which he was standing". A number of allegations developed against Clark during his time in office, including alcoholism, disorderly behavior, mendacity, and in the words of Warner and Yearns, the "attempted seduction of Albert Pike's mistress". Clark's strained relationship with Davis was also a factor in Reynolds's decision to not re-appoint Clark to his seat. The Senate seat previously held by Clark then went to George Graham Vest.

In May 1864, an election for the Confederate House of Representatives resulted in Clark defeating Caspar Wistar Bell. The electorate was composed of Confederate soldiers and Missouri refugees, and Warner and Yearns refer to it as a "farcical poll"; Clark had the support of Reynolds's adversary Price in the election. As a result, he represented the 3rd Missouri Congressional District in the Second Confederate Congress. He held this position from June 10, 1864, to March 18, 1865, and served on the Elections and Military Affairs committees. After the Confederate defeat in 1865, a $10,000 reward was issued for Clark's arrest, but he evaded capture by using a disguise and a fake name to flee to Mexico.

Having heard he was no longer wanted by the authorities, Clark re-entered the United States and was in San Antonio, Texas, by September 1865. Once there, Clark was arrested and held at Fort Jackson in Louisiana. He was released by the then US President Andrew Johnson, by late January 1866, and returned to Missouri in 1870. The requirement for the Ironclad Oath (a statement that one had been loyal to the US and had not participated in rebellion against it) to practice law was overturned by the Supreme Court of the United States in 1867, but the Missouri Supreme Court issued a decision upholding a Missouri legal requirement to take the oath in order to hold political office. The Ironclad Oath was not removed from the Missouri constitution until 1870. Once his political rights were rehabilitated, Clark resumed practicing law, at Fayette. He practiced law for the remainder of his life. In 1872, he ran for a seat in the United States Congress one final time, but the nomination went to his son, who had been a general in the Confederate service.

Clark died on October 29, 1885, in Fayette.

== See also ==
- List of American Civil War generals (Acting Confederate)
- List of United States representatives expelled, censured, or reprimanded

== Sources ==
- Allardice, Bruce S. (1995). More Generals in Gray. Baton Rouge, Louisiana: Louisiana State University Press. ISBN 978-0-8071-3148-0.
- Brooksher, William Riley (2000) [1995]. Bloody Hill: The Civil War Battle of Wilson's Creek. Lincoln, Nebraska: Potomac Books. ISBN 978-1-57488-205-6.
- Burchett, Kenneth E. (2012). The Battle of Carthage, Missouri: First Trans-Mississippi Conflict of the Civil War. Jefferson, North Carolina: McFarland & Co. ISBN 978-0-7864-6959-8.
- Christensen, Lawrence O. (1999). "Reynolds, Thomas Caute (1821–1887)". In Christensen, Lawrence O.; Foley, William E.; Kremer, Gary R.; Winn, Kenneth H. (eds.). Dictionary of Missouri Biography. Columbia, Missouri: University of Missouri Press. pp. 647–648. ISBN 978-0-395-74012-5.
- Conard, Howard L., ed. (1901). Encyclopedia of the History of Missouri. Vol. V. New York, Louisville, and St. Louis: The Southern History Company. OCLC 32872107.
- Eicher, John H.; Eicher, David J. (2001). Civil War High Commands. Stanford, California: Stanford University Press. ISBN 978-0-8047-3641-1.
- Freeman, Joanne B. (2018). The Field of Blood: Violence in Congress and the Road to Civil War. New York City: Farrar, Straus and Giroux. ISBN 978-0-374-15477-6.
- Hinze, David C.; Farnham, Karen (2004) [1997]. The Battle of Carthage: Border War In Southwest Missouri July 5, 1861 (First Pelican ed.). Gretna, Louisiana: Pelican Publishing. ISBN 1-58980-223-3.
- Kennedy, Frances H., ed. (1998). The Civil War Battlefield Guide (2nd ed.). Boston/New York: Houghton Mifflin. ISBN 978-0-395-74012-5.
- Kirkpatrick, Arthur R. (1959). "Missouri's Delegation in the Confederate Congress". Civil War History. 5 (2): 188–198. doi:10.1353/cwh.1959.0023.
- LeSueur, Stephen C. (1990) [1987]. The 1838 Mormon War in Missouri. Columbia, Missouri: University of Missouri Press. ISBN 978-0-8262-6103-8.
- McCandless, Perry (1972). A History of Missouri. Vol. II: 1820 to 1860. Columbia, Missouri: University of Missouri Press. ISBN 0-8262-0124-5.
- McCandless, Perry (1999). "Reynolds, Thomas (1796–1844)". In Christensen, Lawrence O.; Foley, William E.; Kremer, Gary R.; Winn, Kenneth H. (eds.). Dictionary of Missouri Biography. Columbia, Missouri: University of Missouri Press. pp. 646–647. ISBN 978-0-395-74012-5.
- Parrish, William E. (2001) [1973]. A History of Missouri. Vol. III: 1860 to 1875. Columbia, Missouri: University of Missouri Press. ISBN 0-8262-1376-6.
- Phillips, Christopher (2000). Missouri's Confederate: Claiborne Fox Jackson and the Creation of Southern Identity in the Border West. Columbia, Missouri: University of Missouri Press. ISBN 0-8262-1272-7.
- Piston, William Garrett; Hatcher, Richard W. (2000). Wilson's Creek: The Second Battle of the Civil War and the Men Who Fought It. Chapel Hill, North Carolina: University of North Carolina Press. ISBN 0-8078-2515-8.
- Sheridan, P. H. (1899a). "Letter to Hon. E. M. Stanton, September 28, 1865". In Ainsworth, Fred C.; Kirkley, Joseph W. (eds.). The War of the Rebellion: A Compilation of the Official Records of the Union and Confederate Armies. 2. Vol. VIII. Washington, D.C.: Government Printing Office. p. 755. OCLC 427057.
- Sheridan, P. H. (1899b). "Letter to Brig. Gen. E. D. Townsend, January 24, 1866". In Ainsworth, Fred C.; Kirkley, Joseph W. (eds.). The War of the Rebellion: A Compilation of the Official Records of the Union and Confederate Armies. 2. Vol. VIII. Washington, D.C.: Government Printing Office. p. 870. OCLC 427057.
- Vandiver, W. D. (1926). "Reminiscences of General John B. Clark". Missouri Historical Review. XX (2): 223–235. ISSN 0026-6582.
- Warner, Ezra J.; Yearns, W. Buck (1975). Biographical Register of the Confederate Congress. Baton Rouge, Louisiana: Louisiana State University Press. ISBN 0-8071-0092-7.
- Warner, Ezra J. (2006) [1959]. Generals in Gray: Lives of the Confederate Commanders (Louisiana Paperback ed.). Baton Rouge, Louisiana: Louisiana State University Press. ISBN 978-0-8071-3150-3.

Political offices
U.S. House of Representatives
Preceded by James S. Green	Member of the U.S. House of Representatives from Missouri's 3rd congressional district 1857–1861	Succeeded by William Hall
Confederate States Senate
New constituency	Confederate States Senator (Class 1) from Missouri; 1862–1864	Succeeded by George Vest
Confederate States House of Representatives
Preceded by Caspar Bell	Member of the C.S. House of Representatives from Missouri's 3rd congressional district 1864–1865	Constituency abolished
