= Green P. Rice =

American politician

Green P. Rice was an American politician. He was a state legislator in Alabama. He served as President of the Alabama Senate in 1840. He and John D. Phelan signed onto a legislative proposal for a new land district.
