= Senator Phelan =

Senator Phelan may refer to:

- James D. Phelan (1861–1930), U.S. Senator from California from 1915 to 1921
- James Phelan Sr. (1821–1873), Confederate States Senator from Mississippi from 1862 to 1864
