= Charles B. Mitchel =

American politician

Charles Mitchel
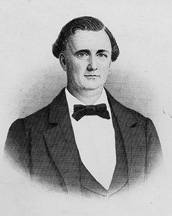

Confederate States Senator from Arkansas
- In office February 18, 1862 – September 20, 1864
- Preceded by: Seat established
- Succeeded by: Augustus Hill Garland

United States Senator from Arkansas
- In office March 4, 1861 – July 11, 1861
- Preceded by: Robert Ward Johnson
- Succeeded by: Benjamin F. Rice (1868)

Personal details
- Born: Charles Burton Mitchel; September 19, 1815 Gallatin, Tennessee, U.S.
- Died: September 20, 1864 (aged 49) Little Rock, Arkansas, C.S.
- Party: Democratic
- Education: University of Nashville (BS); Thomas Jefferson University (MD)

Charles Burton Mitchel (September 19, 1815 – September 20, 1864) was an American politician who served as a United States Senator from March to June 1861 as well as a Confederate States senator from Arkansas from February 18, 1862 until his death in 1864. He was a member of the Democratic Party.

== Biography ==
Mitchel was born on September 19, 1815, in Gallatin, Tennessee. He graduated from the University of Nashville in 1833, and from the Jefferson Medical College in 1836. He then moved to Washington, Arkansas, and practiced medicine for 25 years. He owned slaves. He was a member of the Arkansas House of Representatives in 1848; receiver of public monies from 1853 to 1856; unsuccessful candidate for election in 1860 to the 37th United States Congress. Mitchel was elected as a Democrat to the United States Senate, and served from March 4, 1861, until July 11, 1861, when he was expelled for support of the Confederacy. He was then elected to the Confederate States Senate at the first session of the Arkansas General Assembly and served until September 20, 1864, when he died the day after his forty-ninth birthday. He was interred in the Presbyterian Cemetery, Washington, Arkansas.

== See also ==
- List of Confederate States senators
- List of United States senators from Arkansas
- List of United States senators expelled or censured

U.S. Senate
Preceded by Robert Ward Johnson	United States Senator (Class 3) from Arkansas; 1861; Served alongside: William K. Sebastian	Vacant Title next held by Benjamin F. Rice; 1868
Confederate States Senate
New seat	Confederate States Senator (Class 3) from Arkansas; 1862–1864; Served alongside: Robert Ward Johnson	Succeeded by Augustus Hill Garland
