= Thomas Jenkins Semmes =

American politician

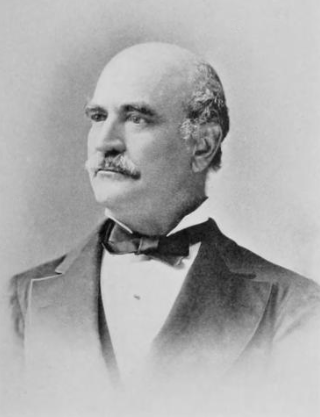

Confederate States Senator from Louisiana
- In office February 18, 1862 – May 10, 1865
- Preceded by: Constituency established
- Succeeded by: Constituency abolished

Attorney General of Louisiana
- In office 1860–1864
- Governor: Thomas Overton Moore
- Preceded by: Warren Moise
- Succeeded by: Flavillus Goode

Personal details
- Born: December 16, 1824 Washington, D.C., U.S.
- Died: June 23, 1899 (aged 74) New Orleans, Louisiana, U.S.
- Party: Democratic

Thomas Jenkins Semmes (December 16, 1824 – June 23, 1899) was an American politician who served as a Confederate States Senator from Louisiana from 1862 to 1865. He was the 9th president of the American Bar Association 1886–1887.

== Biography ==
Thomas Jenkins Semmes was born in Georgetown (Washington, D.C.), son of Raphael Semmes, of the Charles County, Maryland (Tayloe's Neck) Semmes, and Mary Matilda Jenkins Semmes. The Semmes family were merchants of English and French descent. He graduated from Georgetown College (now Georgetown University) in 1842, and received a law degree from Harvard University in 1845. He practiced law in Washington DC until 1850, when he moved to New Orleans. There he became active in the Democratic Party and was soon elected a member of the Louisiana House of Representatives. President James Buchanan appointed him United States Attorney for the Eastern District of Louisiana in 1857, serving till 1859, He was appointed Attorney General of Louisiana in 1860, serving till 1864.

He became a strong advocate of secession. In 1862, he was elected Confederate States Senator from Louisiana, serving until 1865. He was a strong supporter and advocate of Louisiana troops, including the famed Louisiana Tigers, in which his brother Andrew served as a regimental surgeon.

Semmes was a close adviser to Confederate President Jefferson Davis. Due to the Union occupation of New Orleans in 1862, he resided in Richmond during the war, less than a block away from the White House of the Confederacy. Semmes was credited with creating the motto for the Confederacy, "Deo vindice" which appears on the seal. Senator Semmes, in proposing this motto, took pains to stress that the Confederacy had "deviated in the most emphatic manner from the spirit that presided over the construction of the Constitution of the United States, which is silent on the subject of the Deity", and he clearly expected this invocation to bring his side victory.

Semmes' home in Federal-occupied New Orleans was commandeered by order of General Benjamin Butler to quarter Union troops.

After the war, Semmes resumed the practice of law in New Orleans. He became a professor of law at the University of Louisiana (now Tulane University). He served as a member of the Louisiana Constitutional Conventions of 1879 and 1898. In 1886-1887, he served as President of the American Bar Association. Semmes was president of The Boston Club (an exclusive social club) in 1883–1892.

== Personal life ==
Semmes was married on January 8, 1850, in Montgomery, Alabama, to Myra Eulalia Knox and they had seven children. He continued to live in New Orleans, and also maintained a summer home at 191 Culpeper Street in Warrenton, Virginia, which was built in 1873. The home is known as "The Louisiana House."

In 1900 a public school at 1008 Jourdan Street in New Orleans was named for him. The building was sold to a non-profit and suffered significant damage in Hurricane Katrina. It continues to suffer from demolition by neglect.

He died in New Orleans in 1899 and is interred in Metairie Cemetery.

== Family ==
A first cousin was Raphael Semmes, captain of the CSS Alabama and later admiral. Raphael Semmes, son of Richard Thompson Semmes and Catherine Middleton Semmes, grew up with his cousin in Georgetown after Raphael's parents died.

Thomas Jenkins Semmes' sister, Cora Matilda Semmes Ives, was an American writer known for her pro-Confederate utopian novel The Princess of the Moon: A Confederate Fairy Story, published in 1869.

Legal offices
Preceded by Warren Moise	Attorney General of Louisiana; 1860–1864	Succeeded by Flavillus Goode
Confederate States Senate
New constituency	Confederate States Senator (Class 2) from Louisiana; 1862–1865; Served alongside: Edward Sparrow	Constituency abolished
