= James Phelan Jr. =

American journalist

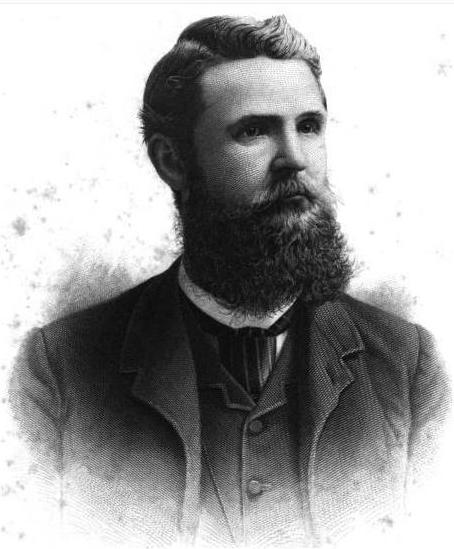

Member of the U.S. House of Representatives from Tennessee's 10th district
- In office March 4, 1887 – January 30, 1891
- Preceded by: Zachary Taylor
- Succeeded by: Josiah Patterson

Personal details
- Born: December 7, 1856 Aberdeen, Mississippi
- Died: January 30, 1891 (aged 34) Nassau, Bahamas
- Citizenship: United States
- Party: Democratic
- Spouse: Mary Early Phelan
- Parent: James Phelan, Sr.
- Relatives: John Dennis Phelan (uncle)
- Education: University of Leipzig
- Profession: Attorney; politician; newspaperman; author

James Phelan Jr. (December 7, 1856 – January 30, 1891) was a nineteenth-century lawyer and politician from Tennessee. He served as a United States congressman from Tennessee, representing the tenth district.

== Biography ==
Phelan was born in Aberdeen, Mississippi to James Phelan Sr., a member of the Confederate Congress, and Eliza J Phelan. He was of Irish descent on his father's side, and Scottish descent on his mother' side. He attended various schools. In 1874 he went abroad, and in 1878 received his Ph.D. from the University of Leipzig, having written his dissertation on the life and works of Philip Massinger. Returning to the United States, he married Mary Early of Virginia, with whom he had three children.

== Career ==
In 1881, Phelan became the owner of The Avalanche, a newspaper in Memphis, Tennessee. He was admitted to the Tennessee bar that same year, and began the practice of law in Memphis.

Elected as a Democrat to the United States House of Representatives, Phelan served in that body from March 4, 1887, until his death in 1891. During his term in the House, he published his book, History of Tennessee, the Making of a State.

== Death ==
Phelan died in Nassau, Bahamas on January 30, 1891. He is interred at Elmwood Cemetery in Memphis, Tennessee.

== See also ==
- List of members of the United States Congress who died in office (1790–1899)

U.S. House of Representatives
Preceded by Zachary Taylor	Member of the U.S. House of Representatives from Tennessee's 10th congressional district March 4, 1887 - January 30, 1891	Succeeded by Josiah Patterson
