= William Wilson (Illinois judge) =

American judge (1794–1857)

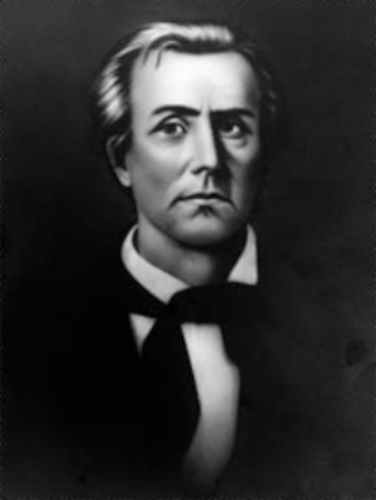
- Portrait, c. 1848

3rd Chief Justice of the Supreme Court of Illinois
- In office January 19, 1825 – December 4, 1848
- Preceded by: Thomas Reynolds
- Succeeded by: Samuel H. Treat

Associate Justice of the Supreme Court of Illinois
- In office August 17, 1819 – January 19, 1825
- Preceded by: William P. Foster
- Succeeded by: Theophilus W. Smith

Personal details
- Born: April 27, 1794 Loudoun, Virginia, U.S.
- Died: April 29, 1857 (aged 63) Carmi, Illinois, U.S.
- Party: Whig
- Spouse: Mary Davidson (m. 1820)
- Occupation: Lawyer; judge; farmer

Military service
- Branch/service: United States Army
- Battles/wars: War of 1812

William Wilson (April 27, 1794 – April 29, 1857) was an American jurist.

Born in Loudoun County, Virginia, Wilson studied law in Virginia. In 1812, he served in the United States Army under General Andrew Jackson in New Orleans, Louisiana during the War of 1812. In 1817, Wilson moved to Kentucky and then settled in Carmi, Illinois. Wilson was admitted to the Illinois Bar. In 1819, Wilson was elected to the Illinois Supreme Court and served until 1848 when the Illinois Constitution of 1848 went into effect. He served as chief justice of the supreme court. Wilson was a Whig and later a Democrat. In 1848, Wilson resumed his law practice. He died in Carmi, Illinois.
