= 1840 Missouri lieutenant gubernatorial election =

- August 3, 1840
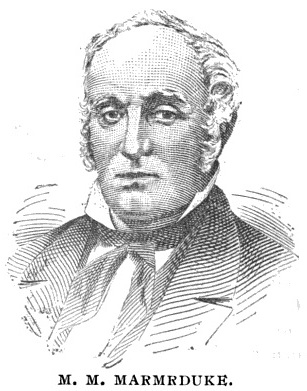
Nominee	Meredith Marmaduke
Party	Democratic
Popular vote	Unknown
Percentage	100.00%
Lieutenant Governor before election
Franklin Cannon
Democratic
Elected Lieutenant Governor
Meredith Marmaduke
Democratic

The 1840 Missouri lieutenant gubernatorial election was held on August 3, 1840, in order to elect the lieutenant governor of Missouri. Democratic nominee Meredith Marmaduke won the election as he ran unopposed. The exact results of the election are unknown.

== General election ==
On election day, August 3, 1840, Democratic nominee Meredith Marmaduke won the election as he ran unopposed, thereby retaining Democratic control over the office of lieutenant governor. Marmaduke was sworn in as the 6th lieutenant governor of Missouri on November 16, 1840.

=== Results ===
Missouri lieutenant gubernatorial election, 1840
Party	Candidate	Votes	%
Democratic	Meredith Marmaduke	Unknown	100.00
Total votes		Unknown	100.00
Democratic hold			

== See also ==
- 1840 Missouri gubernatorial election
