= List of Confederate States senators =

The Confederate Senate was the upper house of the Congress of the Confederate States of America. Its members were, like those of the United States Senate at the time, elected for six year terms by the state legislature of each state, with each state having two senators. The Confederate Senate met only between 1862 and 1865.

In addition to the eleven states that made up the Confederacy, representatives were also seated from Kentucky and Missouri.

Members of the Confederate Senate were divided into classes by lot on February 21, 1862 as follows:

- Class 1 (1862–64), (1864–70): Alabama, Arkansas, Florida, Georgia, Kentucky, Mississippi, Missouri, North Carolina
- Class 2 (1862–66): Florida, Louisiana, Mississippi, Missouri, North Carolina, South Carolina, Tennessee, Texas, Virginia
- Class 3 (1862–68): Alabama, Arkansas, Georgia, Kentucky, Louisiana, South Carolina, Tennessee, Texas, Virginia

== Alabama ==
=== Class 1 ===
Image	Name	Term
	Clement Claiborne Clay	1862–1864
	Richard Wilde Walker	1864–1865

=== Class 3 ===
Image	Name	Term
	William Lowndes Yancey	1862–1863
	Robert Jemison Jr.	1863–1865

== Arkansas ==
=== Class 1 ===
Image	Name	Term
	Robert Ward Johnson	1862–1865

=== Class 3 ===
Image	Name	Term
	Charles Burton Mitchel	1862–1864
	Augustus Hill Garland	1864–1865

== Florida ==
=== Class 1 === : Image / Name / Term; / James McNair Baker / 1862–1865

=== Class 2 === : Image / Name / Term; / Augustus Emmett Maxwell / 1862–1865

== Georgia ==
=== Class 1 ===
Image	Name	Term
	John Wood Lewis (Robert Toombs declined)	1862–1863
	Herschel Vespasian Johnson	1863–1865

=== Class 3 ===
Image	Name	Term
	Benjamin Harvey Hill	1862–1865

== Kentucky ==
=== Class 1 === : Image / Name / Term; / William Emmett Simms / 1862–1865	=== Class 3 === : Image / Name / Term; / Henry Cornelius Burnett / 1862–1865

== Louisiana ==
=== Class 2 === : Image / Name / Term; / Thomas Jenkins Semmes / 1862–1865

=== Class 3 === : Image / Name / Term; / Edward Sparrow / 1862–1865

== Mississippi ==
=== Class 1 ===
Image	Name	Term
	James Phelan Sr.	1862–1864
	John William Clark Watson	1864–1865

=== Class 2 ===
Image	Name	Term
	Albert Gallatin Brown	1862–1865

== Missouri ==
=== Class 1 ===
Image	Name	Term
	John Bullock Clark	1862–1864
	George Graham Vest	1865–1865

=== Class 2 ===
Image	Name	Term
	Robert Ludwell Yates Peyton	1862–1863
	Waldo Porter Johnson	1863–1865

== North Carolina ==
=== Class 1 ===
Image	Name	Term
	George Davis	1862–1864
	Edwin Godwin Reade	1864–1864
	William Alexander Graham	1864–1865

=== Class 2 ===
Image	Name	Term
	William Theophilus Dortch	1862–1865

== South Carolina ==
=== Class 2 === : Image / Name / Term; / Robert Woodward Barnwell / 1862–1865

=== Class 3 === : Image / Name / Term; / James Lawrence Orr / 1862–1865

== Tennessee ==
=== Class 2 === : Image / Name / Term; / Gustavus Adolphus Henry / 1862–1865

=== Class 3 === : Image / Name / Term; / Landon Carter Haynes / 1862–1865

== Texas ==
=== Class 2 === : Image / Name / Term; / Louis Trezevant Wigfall / 1862–1865

=== Class 3 === : Image / Name / Term; / Williamson Simpson Oldham / 1862–1865

== Virginia ==
=== Class 2 ===
Image	Name	Term
	William Ballard Preston	1862–1862
	Allen Taylor Caperton	1863–1865

=== Class 3 ===
Image	Name	Term
	Robert Mercer Taliaferro Hunter	1862–1865
