= George Graham Vest =

American politician (1830–1904)

George Vest
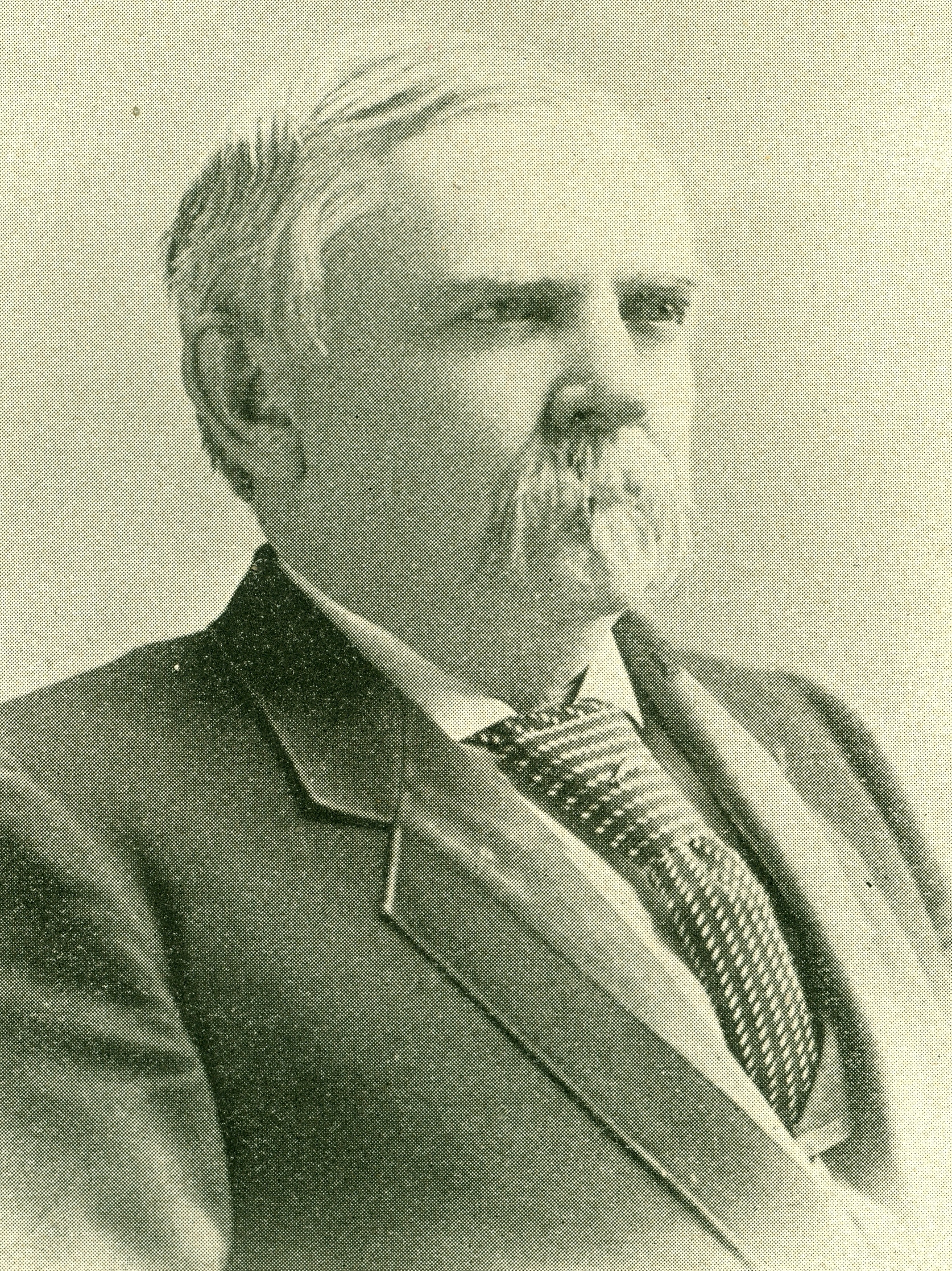

United States Senator from Missouri
- In office March 4, 1879 – March 3, 1903
- Preceded by: James Shields
- Succeeded by: William J. Stone

Confederate States Senator from Missouri
- In office January 12, 1865 – May 10, 1865
- Preceded by: John Bullock Clark
- Succeeded by: Constituency abolished

Member of the Confederate States House of Representatives from Missouri's 5th district
- In office February 18, 1862 – January 12, 1865
- Preceded by: Constituency established
- Succeeded by: Constituency abolished

Member of the Missouri House of Representatives
- In office 1860

Personal details
- Born: December 6, 1830 Frankfort, Kentucky, U.S.
- Died: August 9, 1904 (aged 73) Sweet Springs, Missouri, U.S.
- Party: Democratic
- Education: Centre College; Transylvania University

George Graham Vest (December 6, 1830 – August 9, 1904) was an American politician. Born in Frankfort, Kentucky, he was known for his skills in oration and debate. Vest, a lawyer as well as a politician, served as a Missouri state representative, a Confederate congressman during the Civil War, and finally a U.S. senator.

Vest was best known during his lifetime for his a "man's best friend" closing arguments from the trial in which damages were sought for the killing of a dog named Old Drum on October 18, 1869.

== Early life and career ==
Vest graduated from Centre College, Danville, Kentucky, in 1848 and from the law department of Transylvania University, Lexington, Kentucky, in 1853. He was admitted to the bar in 1853 and planned to move to California. However, while en route, he stopped in Pettis County, Missouri, where he defended a young African-American man accused of murder. Vest's client was acquitted but soon burned at the stake by an angry mob. Vest's own life was also threatened, but he nonetheless decided to stay in Missouri permanently, settling in Georgetown. In 1854 he married Sallie Sneed of Danville, Kentucky. They had three children, two sons and a daughter.

== Initial public service ==
In 1860, after moving to Boonville, Missouri, he was elected to the Missouri House of Representatives and served as a Democratic presidential elector. As a Missouri representative he was chairman of the Committee on Federal Relations. Vest served in the House until late 1861 during which he wrote the Vest Resolutions in which he denounced coercion of the South.

When the Civil War broke out Vest was a strong advocate of maintaining slavery during the Missouri secession crisis, and eventually sided with the Confederacy. He proposed the Secession Ordinance that was passed by the Missouri legislature in October 1861. The following year, he briefly served as judge advocate with the Army of Missouri, commanded by former Governor Sterling Price. He served in the House of Representatives of the Confederate Congress from February 1862 to January 12, 1865, when he resigned, having been appointed to fill a vacancy in the Confederate Senate.

== Old Drum ==
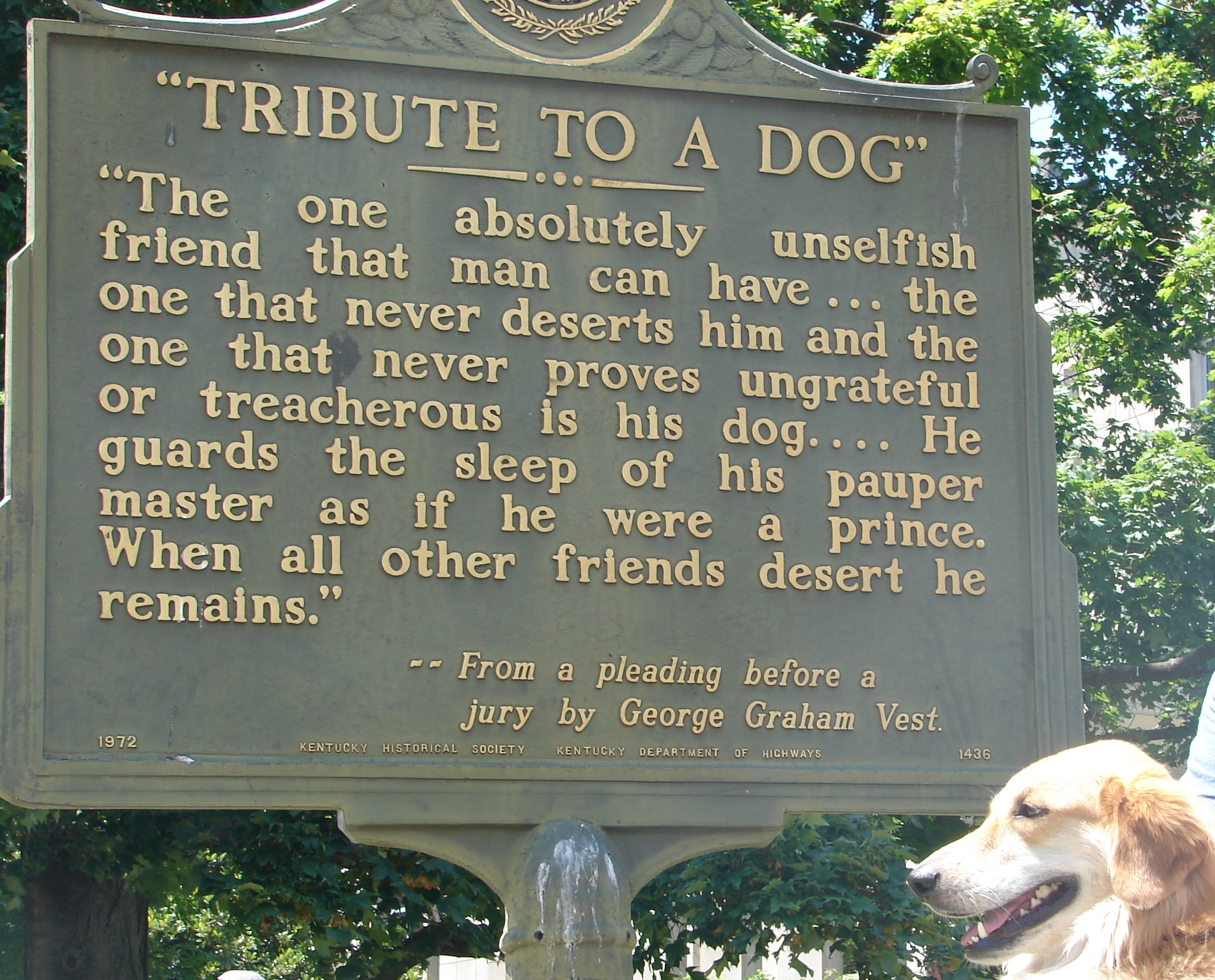
State historical marker in Owensboro, Kentucky

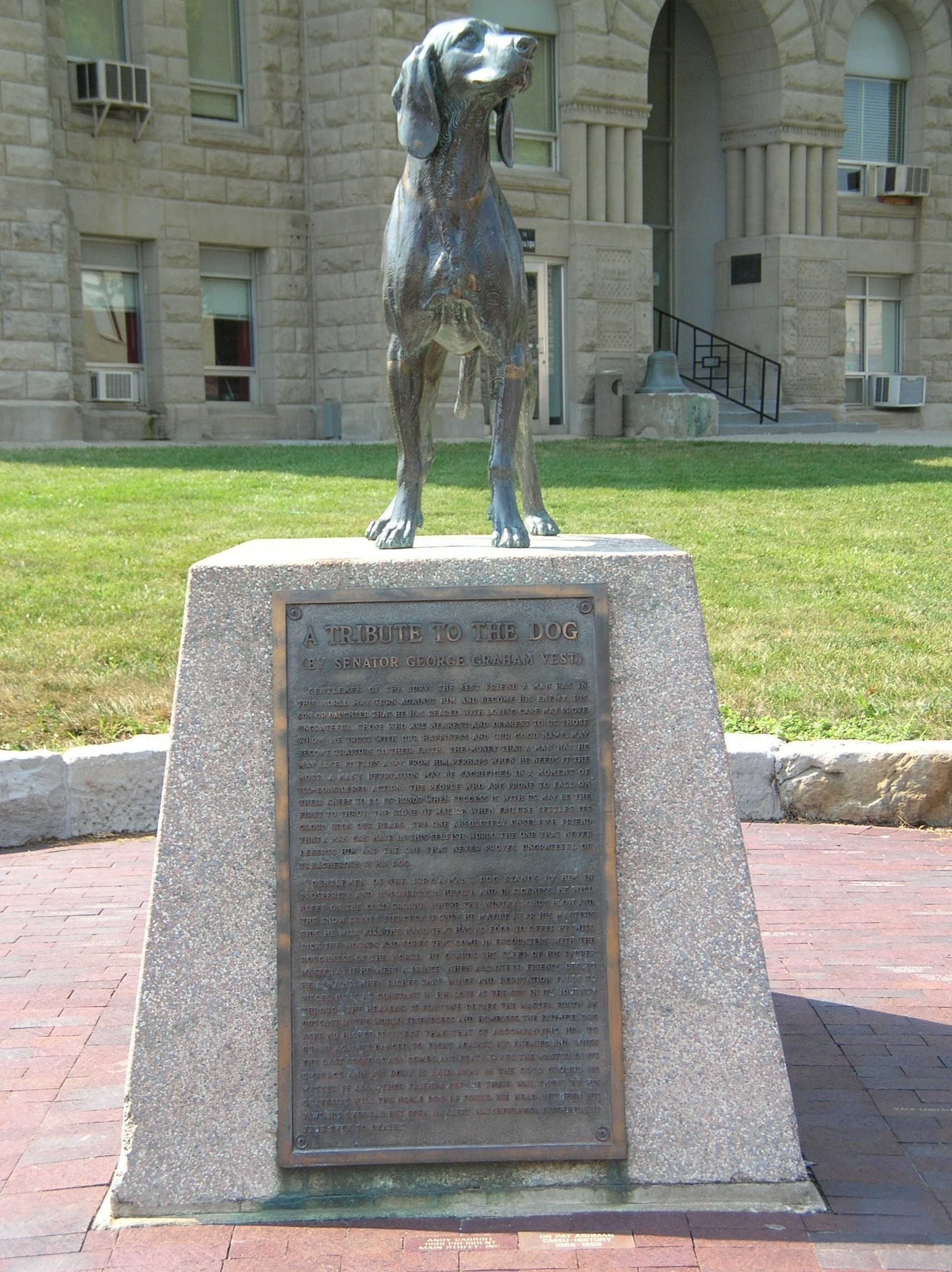
Statue in front of Johnson County courthouse in Warrensburg

After the war he returned to Pettis County, moving to Sedalia, Missouri, and resumed his law practice. It was at this time in 1869 that Vest was asked to represent Charles Burden and Old Drum in the case that would make him famous: Burden v. Hornsby.

Vest took the case tried on September 23, 1870, in which he represented a client whose hunting dog, a foxhound named Drum (or Old Drum), had been killed by a sheep farmer, Leonidas Hornsby. The farmer (Burden's brother-in-law) had previously announced his intentions to kill any dog found on his property; the dog's owner was suing for damages in the amount of $150 (equivalent to $3,819 in 2025), the maximum allowed by law.

During the trial, Vest stated that he would "win the case or apologize to every dog in Missouri". Vest's closing argument to the jury made no reference to any of the testimony offered during the trial, and instead offered a eulogy of sorts. Vest's "Eulogy of the Dog" is one of the most enduring passages of purple prose in American courtroom history (only a partial transcript has survived):

Gentlemen of the jury: The best friend a man has in this world may turn against him and become his enemy. His son or daughter that he has reared with loving care may prove ungrateful. Those who are nearest and dearest to us, those whom we trust with our happiness and our good name, may become traitors to their faith. The money that a man has, he may lose. It flies away from him, perhaps when he needs it the most. A man's reputation may be sacrificed in a moment of ill-considered action. The people who are prone to fall on their knees to do us honor when success is with us may be the first to throw the stone of malice when failure settles its cloud upon our heads. The one absolutely unselfish friend that a man can have in this selfish world, the one that never deserts him and the one that never proves ungrateful or treacherous is his dog.

Gentlemen of the jury: A man's dog stands by him in prosperity and in poverty, in health and in sickness. He will sleep on the cold ground, where the wintry winds blow and the snow drives fiercely, if only he may be near his master's side. He will kiss the hand that has no food to offer, he will lick the wounds and sores that come in encounters with the roughness of the world. He guards the sleep of his pauper master as if he were a prince. When all other friends desert, he remains. When riches take wings and reputation falls to pieces, he is as constant in his love as the sun in its journey through the heavens.

If fortune drives the master forth an outcast in the world, friendless and homeless, the faithful dog asks no higher privilege than that of accompanying him to guard against danger, to fight against his enemies, and when the last scene of all comes, and death takes the master in its embrace and his body is laid away in the cold ground, no matter if all other friends pursue their way, there by his graveside will the noble dog be found, his head between his paws, his eyes sad but open in alert watchfulness, faithful and true even to death.

Vest won the case (the jury awarded $50 to the dog's owner) and also won its appeal to the Missouri Supreme Court. A bust of the dog resides in the Missouri Supreme Court building in Jefferson City, Missouri. In 1958, a statue of the dog was erected on the Johnson County Courthouse lawn containing a summation of Vest's closing speech, "A man's best friend is his dog".

== U.S. Senate ==
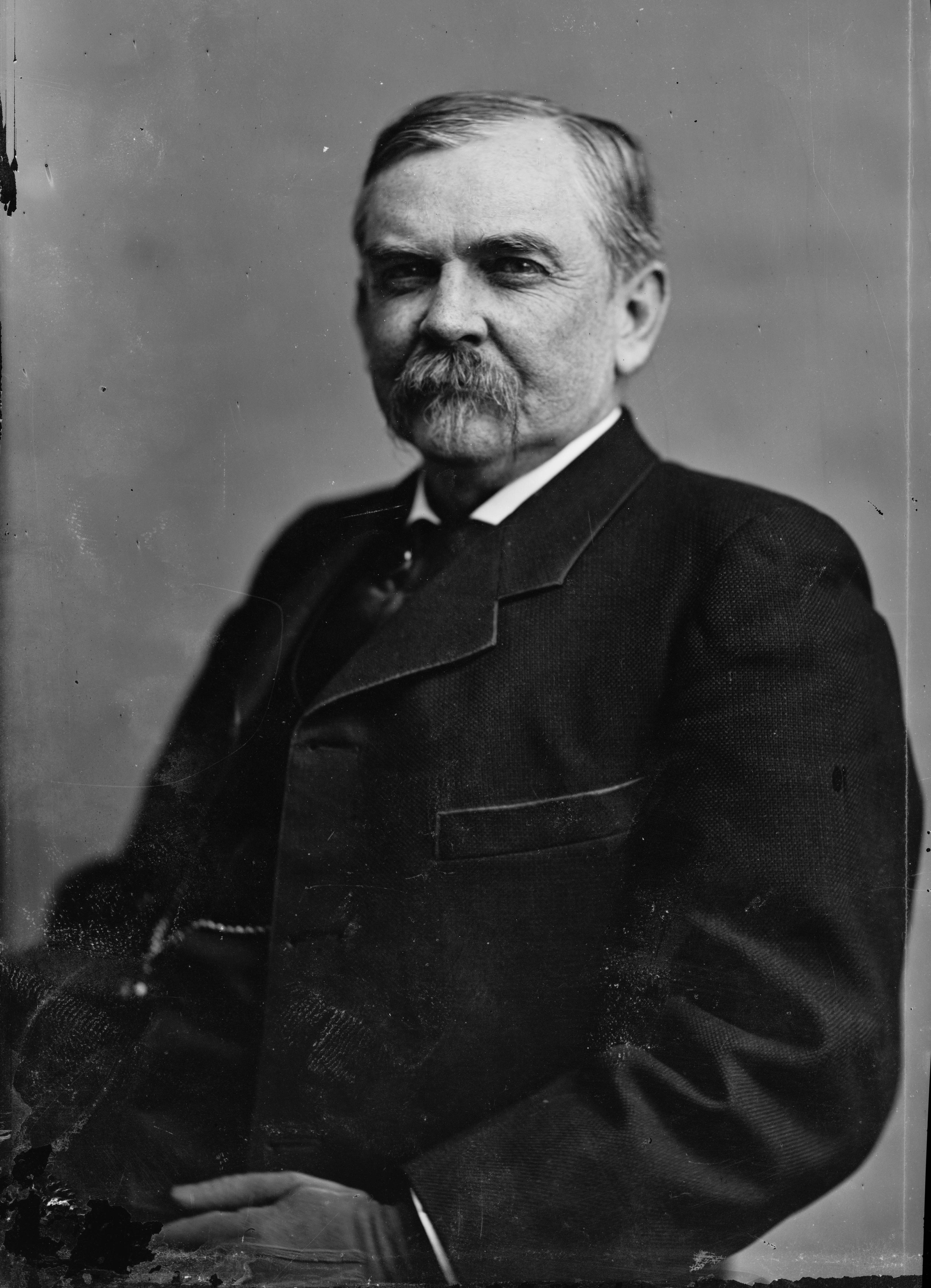
Senator Vest

In 1877, Vest moved to Kansas City, Missouri, where he was elected two years later in 1879 to the United States Senate. He was chairman on the Committee on Public Buildings and Grounds (Fifty-third Congress) and served on the Committee on Epidemic Diseases (Fifty-fourth Congress), Committee on Public Health and National Quarantine (Fifty-fourth through Fifty-seventh Congresses). He was re-elected for three more terms in 1885, 1891 and 1897 and remained a US Senator until March 4, 1903, when he retired from public life due to ill health.

=== Defender of Yellowstone ===
In 1882, Vest became aware of concession abuses and outright attempts at uncontrolled monopolies being proposed for Yellowstone National Park concessions by the railroads and other businessmen. He introduced and eventually helped pass legislation that required the Secretary of Interior to submit concession and construction contracts to the Senate for oversight thus stifling potential corruption and abuses. Throughout the remainder of his Senate career, Vest was considered the "Self-appointed Protector of Yellowstone National Park".

== Death ==
On August 9, 1904, Vest died at his summer home in Sweet Springs, Missouri, the last living Confederate States Senator. He was buried at Bellefontaine Cemetery in St. Louis, Missouri.

Confederate States House of Representatives
New constituency	Member of the C.S. House of Representatives from Missouri's 5th congressional district 1862–1865	
Confederate States Senate
Preceded by John Clark	Confederate States Senator (Class 1) from Missouri; 1865; Served alongside: Waldo Johnson	
U.S. Senate
Preceded by James Shields	United States Senator (Class 3) from Missouri; 1879–1903; Served alongside: Francis Cockrell	Succeeded by William Stone
