= Cora Semmes Ives =

American novelist

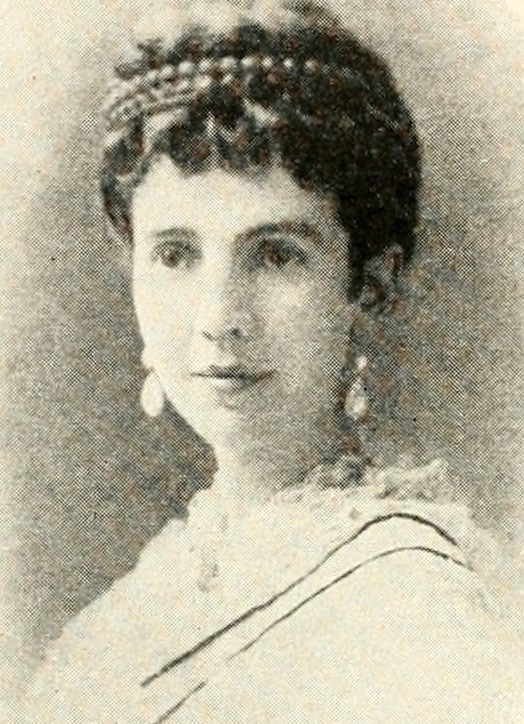
- Born: Cora Matilda Semmes; June 26, 1834; Washington, D.C.
- Died: January 27, 1916 (aged 81); Saratoga Springs, New York
- Spouse: Joseph Christmas Ives
- Children: 3
- Relatives: Thomas Jenkins Semmes, brother
- Writing career
- Notable work: The Princess of the Moon: A Confederate Fairy Story (1869)

Cora Matilda Semmes Ives (née Semmes; June 26, 1834 – January 27, 1916) was an American writer. She is known for her pro-Confederate utopian novel The Princess of the Moon: A Confederate Fairy Story, published in 1869.

== Life and work ==
Cora Semmes was the daughter of Raphael Semmes (1786–1846) and Mary Matilda née Jenkins Semmes (1800–1881). She was the sister of Confederate Senator Thomas Jenkins Semmes. On June 15, 1855, she married Joseph Christmas Ives, an explorer of the Western United States who later served as a colonel in the Confederate States Army. They had three children, Edward Bernard Ives (1855–1903), Francis Joseph Ives (1857–1908), and Eugene Semmes Ives (1859–1917).

In 1861, the Ives moved to Richmond, Virginia, capital of the Confederacy. During the American Civil War, the Ives' home became a social center for prominent Confederates, including CSA President Jefferson Davis. Davis brought foreign dignitaries and journalists to the Ives home, and Cora Ives staged a number of theater productions, sometimes for audiences as large as 300. However, Joseph Ives' alcoholism eventually tarnished the reputation of the prominent couple and prompted gossip. Following the Civil War, the couple moved to New York City, and his alcoholism perhaps contributed to Joseph Ives' death in 1868.

The Ives family were devout Catholics. In 1874, she and her two youngest sons made a pilgrimage to the Sanctuary of Our Lady of Lourdes and visited Einsiedeln Abbey and the stigmatic Louise Lateau.

She spent the last years of her life at Dr. Strong's Sanitarium in Saratoga Springs, New York.

== The Princess of the Moon ==
The Princess of the Moon: A Confederate Fairy Story

In 1869, Ives published The Princess of the Moon: A Confederate Fairy Story under the pen name "A Lady of Warrenton, Va". The novel tells the story of Randolph, a former Confederate soldier who is visited by the Fairy of the Moon. The Fairy provides Randolph a winged horse named Hope which transports him to the moon, a beautiful utopian society. Randolph undergoes a series of challenges to win the hand of the Princess of the Moon, but their wedding is interrupted by the appearance of Yankee carpetbaggers, invading the moon in hot air balloons, accompanied by Randolph's former slave. The Fairy of the Moon summons dragons to drive off the Yankee balloonists, who drop the silverware they looted from Randolph's plantation as they flee. The Fairy bestows on Randolph a new Confederate uniform complete with a sword and he lives happily ever after with the Princess, while the carpetbaggers must resort to selling Central Park balloon rides to newlyweds.

Wetta and Novelli write that "the story... is imperfectly imagined; the writing is awkward" but is "revealing" as a demonstration of the Lost Cause narrative: "The fairy tale as metaphor reveals the magic thinking that turned Southern military defeat into a moral victory – shifting the burden of history from the shoulders of the Southerners to the Northerners and the newly freed slaves". In The Encyclopedia of Science Fiction, John Clute notes the "equipoisal" nature of the novel freely mixing fantasy and science fiction elements and describes the moon utopia as "a purified vision of the antebellum South."
