= Thomas Reynolds (governor) =

American politician (1796–1844)

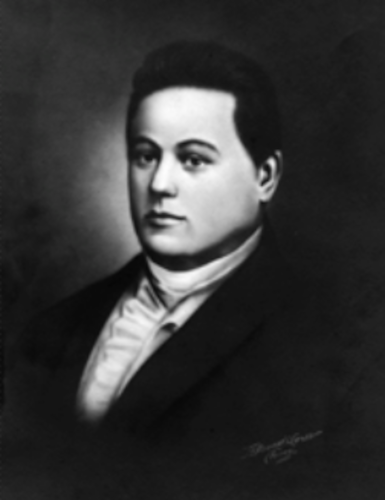
- Portrait, c. 1825

7th Governor of Missouri
- In office November 16, 1840 – February 9, 1844
- Lieutenant: Meredith Marmaduke
- Preceded by: Lilburn Boggs
- Succeeded by: Meredith Marmaduke

5th Speaker of the Missouri House of Representatives
- In office November 19, 1832 – November 17, 1834
- Preceded by: John Thornton
- Succeeded by: John Jameson

Member of the Missouri House of Representatives from Howard County
- In office November 19, 1832 – November 17, 1834 Serving with John Morris and Nathaniel Ford

Member of the Illinois House of Representatives from Randolph County
- In office December 4, 1826 – December 1, 1828 Serving with John Lacey

2nd Chief Justice of the Supreme Court of Illinois
- In office August 31, 1822 – January 19, 1825
- Preceded by: Joseph Phillips
- Succeeded by: William Wilson

1st Clerk of the Illinois House of Representatives
- In office October 5, 1818 – August 31, 1822
- Speaker: John Messinger; John McLean
- Preceded by: Office established
- Succeeded by: Charles Dunn

Personal details
- Born: March 12, 1796 Bracken County, Kentucky
- Died: February 9, 1844 (aged 47) Jefferson City, Missouri
- Resting place: Woodlawn Cemetery, Jefferson City, Missouri
- Party: Democratic
- Spouse: Eliza Ann Young (m. 1823)
- Children: 1, Ambrose Dudley Reynolds
- Occupation: Lawyer; politician

Thomas Reynolds (March 12, 1796 – February 9, 1844) was an American politician and lawyer who was the chief justice of the Illinois Supreme Court as well as the seventh governor of Missouri. A Democrat, he is notable for being one of the few American politicians to die by suicide while in office.

== Early life ==
=== Childhood and education ===
Thomas Reynolds was born in Bracken County, Kentucky to Nathaniel and Catherine (née Vernon) Reynolds. He received his basic education and education in Law while in Kentucky and was admitted to the state Bar in 1817.

Reynolds moved with his family to Illinois in his early twenties, settling in the Springfield area.

=== Marriage and family ===
Despite the same last name, and similar political career paths in Illinois, contrary to other sources John Reynolds is not the brother of Thomas Reynolds. Reynolds married Eliza Ann Young on September 20, 1823, and the couple had one child, a son, Ambrose Dudley Reynolds, born in 1824.

== Career ==
=== Legislative and judicial service ===
Reynolds served as Clerk for the Illinois House of Representatives from 1818 until his appointment to the Illinois Supreme Court on August 31, 1822. He remained on the high court until January 19, 1825, and served as the court's chief justice during his entire tenure. He served one term in the Illinois House of Representatives from 1826 to 1828. Failing to be reelected, Reynolds and his family moved to Missouri, settling in the Howard County town of Fayette. Thomas Reynolds established a legal practice in Fayette, and for a time also served as editor of the Boonslick Democrat newspaper. Elected to represent Howard County in the Missouri Legislature in 1832, he was quickly named Speaker of the House. In January 1837 Missouri governor Lilburn Boggs nominated Reynolds to be the circuit judge for the 2nd judicial district, a position he held until being elected Missouri's seventh governor in 1840.

=== As Governor ===
After soundly defeating John B. Clark in the 1840 gubernatorial election, Thomas Reynolds presided over a time of great expansion and growth in Missouri. The Oregon Trail, with its kick-off point in western Missouri, was booming and the economy was beginning to recover in the state and nation from the Panic of 1837. A Jacksonian Democrat and follower of Missouri Senator Thomas Hart Benton, Reynolds generally adhered to their limited-government, hard currency viewpoints. Regarding the issue of slavery Reynolds believed in each state government's right to decide the issue for itself and that abolitionists or others helping enslaved Americans escape should face life imprisonment. Under his leadership fifteen new counties were formed in Missouri. One issue that Reynolds championed perhaps the hardest was for the elimination of debtor's prisons, which the Missouri General Assembly did in February 1843. While he was governor Reynolds worked to improve voting requirements and access. A milestone in education occurred when the first class was enrolled at the University of Missouri.

== Death ==
For several months prior to his death, Reynolds was reportedly in ill health and suffering from melancholia. Political opponents in Missouri's Whig party, and certain newspapers under their influence, were particularly harsh in their criticism of Reynolds, his actions and positions as governor. During breakfast on the morning of February 9, 1844, Reynolds asked a blessing, which was not usual for him. Following the meal, he locked himself in his Executive Mansion office and drew the shutters closed. Some time later, a passer-by heard a shot and, upon investigation, Reynolds was found dead at his desk with an apparently self-inflicted gunshot wound. On the governor's writing table was a sealed message addressed to his friend, Colonel William G. Minor, in which he said "I have labored and discharged my duties faithfully to the public, but this has not protected me from the slanders and abuse which has rendered my life a burden to me...I pray to God to forgive them and teach them more charity."

A large crowd of mourners attended Reynolds's funeral and burial at Woodlawn Cemetery in Jefferson City, Missouri. Two years later, a large granite shaft was erected at his gravesite. Reynolds County, Missouri was also named in his honor. Reynolds's successor, Meredith M. Marmaduke, urged the creation of a system and building for the care of the mentally ill in his 1844 message to the legislature. This helped lead to the opening of Fulton State Hospital in Fulton, Missouri in 1851.

Joseph Smith, the founder of The Church of Jesus Christ of Latter-day Saints, had been in conflict with Reynolds. In a March 10, 1844 sermon, Smith taught that God had promised to give him anything he asked. He stated that he prayed to God to "deliver me out of the hands of the Governor of Missouri and if it must needs be to accomplish it to take him away[.] [T]he next news that came pouring down...was Governor Reynolds had shot himself,"

Missouri House of Representatives
Preceded by John Thornton	Speaker of the Missouri House of Representatives; 1832–1834	Succeeded by John Jameson
Party political offices
Preceded by Lilburn Boggs	Democratic nominee for Governor of Missouri; 1840	Succeeded by John Cummins Edwards
Political offices
Preceded by Lilburn Boggs	Governor of Missouri; 1840–1844	Succeeded by Meredith Miles Marmaduke
