= John Dennis Phelan =

American judge

Justice of the Supreme Court of Alabama
- In office 1863–1865
- In office 1851–1853

Speaker of the Alabama House of Representatives
- In office 1839–1840
- Preceded by: James W. McClung
- Succeeded by: Samuel Walker

Attorney General of Alabama
- In office 1836–1838
- Preceded by: Alexander Meek
- Succeeded by: Lincoln Clark

Personal details
- Born: March 23, 1809 New Brunswick, New Jersey, US
- Died: September 9, 1879 (aged 70) Birmingham, Alabama, US
- Party: Democratic
- Spouse: Mary Anne Harris (m. 1835; died 1870)
- Relations: James Phelan, Sr. (brother); James Phelan, Jr. (nephew); Phelan Beale (grandson)
- Children: 11
- Parent(s): John Phelan; Priscilla Oakes Ford Phelan
- Education: University of Nashville

John Dennis Phelan (March 23, 1809 – September 9, 1879) was an American editor, politician and jurist. He served as Speaker of the Alabama House of Representatives.

== Early life ==
Phelan was born on March 23, 1809, in New Brunswick, New Jersey. He was the son of John Phelan (d. 1850), an Irish immigrant, and Priscilla Oakes (née Ford) Phelan (1785–1864), of New England stock, who moved to Richmond and, later, Huntsville, Alabama in 1818. His father was cashier of the Bank of New Brunswick during the War of 1812. His brother was James Phelan, Sr., also a jurist and journalist.

He graduated at the University of Nashville in 1828 and studied law in Virginia with the Hon. Benjamin Watkins Leigh.

== Career ==
After being admitted to the bar in Virginia, he returned to Alabama in 1830. He became editor of the Huntsville Democrat. From 1833 to 1835, he served in the Alabama Legislature as a Democrat representing Madison County, until he became the Attorney General of Alabama in 1836. After he was succeeded at Attorney General by Lincoln Clark in 1838, he returned to the Legislature where he was elected Speaker of the Alabama House of Representatives in 1839, serving in that role until 1840.

From 1841 to 1851, he was a judge of the circuit court, until his elevation to the Alabama Supreme Court in 1851, holding that office for two years until 1853, and then again in 1863-65 when "he was removed by the 'Reconstruction' carpet-bag ruler of Alabama." In the interval when he was not a judge in the Alabama Supreme Court, he was clerk to that body, and also later in 1865–68. He published two poems about Civil War, “Good Old Cause” and “Ye Men of Alabama.” He became professor of law in the University of the South in 1869, holding the chair until his death.

== Personal life ==
On April 16, 1835, he was married to Mary Anne Harris (1815–1870) in Limestone County, Alabama. Her parents were Mary Anne (née Moore) Harris and Gen. Thomas Kent Harris, a native of Virginia who moved to Tennessee and served as a representative of that state in the U.S. Congress from 1813 to 1815. Together, they were the parents of:

- Thomas Harris Phelan (1836–1862), who died at the Battle of Gaines's Mill during the U.S. Civil War.
- Watkins John Phelan (1838–1863), who died at the Siege of Petersburg during the War.
- Dennis Phelan (1839–1856)
- John Paul Phelan (1841–1890), a captain of Phelan's Light Artillery for the Confederate States Army.
- Ellis Phelan (1843–1897), a fellow judge and clerk of the House of Representatives who was a captain in the 45th Regiment of Alabama Volunteers.
- Priscella Phelan (b. 1846), who married G. A. Williamson in 1881.
- Mary Harris Phelan (1847–1928), who married Robert Leonidas Watt (1844–1886) in 1872.
- Anna King Phelan, who married James Chester Derby in 1884.
- Sidney Harris Phelan (1854–1913), who married Palmer Graham in 1877.
- Caroline Blount Phelan (1856–1948), who married Jesse Drew Beale (1851–1905) in 1877.
- James Lalor Phelan (1859–1899), who married Sallie Tankersley in 1889.

After several months of ill health, Phelan died in Birmingham, Alabama on September 9, 1879.

=== Descendants ===
His grandson was Phelan Beale (1881–1956), who formed the law practice of "Bouvier and Beale" with Jacqueline Onassis's grandfather, "Major" John Vernou Bouvier, Jr. Beale was married to Edith Ewing Bouvier, sister of John Vernou Bouvier III and aunt to Jackie Kennedy.

Legal offices
Preceded by Alexander Meek	Attorney General of Alabama; 1836–1838	Succeeded by Lincoln Clark
Political offices
Preceded by James W. McClung	Speaker of the Alabama House of Representatives; 1839–1840	Succeeded by Samuel Walker
Preceded by Newly created seat	Justice of the Supreme Court of Alabama; 1851–1853; 1863–1865	Succeeded by Seat abolished
