= James Phelan Sr. =

American politician

James Phelan
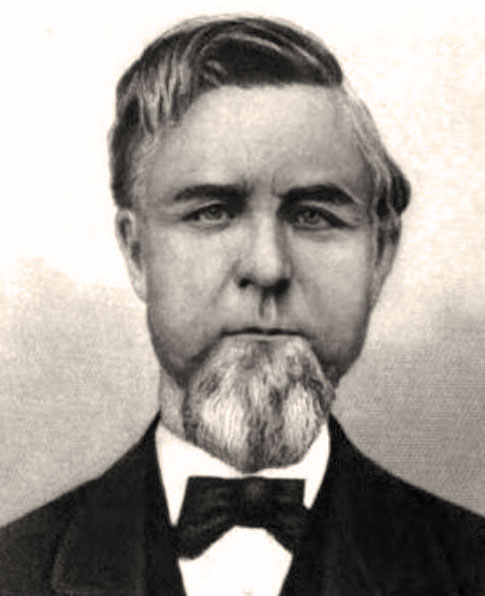

Confederate States Senator from Mississippi
- In office February 18, 1862 – February 17, 1864
- Preceded by: Constituency established
- Succeeded by: John Watson

Personal details
- Born: October 11, 1821 Huntsville, Alabama, U.S.
- Died: May 17, 1873 (aged 51) Memphis, Tennessee, U.S.
- Party: Democratic
- Children: James Phelan Jr.
- Relatives: John Dennis Phelan (brother); Phelan Beale (grandnephew)

James Phelan Sr. (October 11, 1821 – May 17, 1873) was a senator in the Confederate Congress during the American Civil War from the state of Mississippi.

== Biography ==
He was born in Huntsville, Alabama to John Phelan and Priscilla Oakes (Ford) Morris, a niece of Sir Richard Oakes of Scotland. They married on 8 June 1807. His father John Phelan was a native of Marysbourough, Queen's County, Ireland. John Phelan was the grand-nephew of James Phelan, Bishop of Ossory (d. 1695). John Phelan married Mary Sluigan, of Cloncons Castle, King's County, and came to the United States in 1793, at the age of twenty-four. He settled first in New York City, and afterwards moved to New Jersey, where he was cashier of the Bank of New Brunswick, moving to Huntsville, Alabama in 1818.

James Phelan was apprenticed as a printer to the Democrat at fourteen years of age, subsequently edited the Flag of the Union, a Democratic organ, and became state printer in 1843. He was admitted to the bar in 1846, moved to Mississippi in 1849, and settled in Aberdeen, where he soon established a large practice.

He became a member of the Mississippi State Senate in 1860, then was elected as a Senator from Mississippi in the First Confederate Congress 1862–64. In 1863, he introduced what was called the "Crucial bill of the Confederacy," which was a proposition to confiscate all the cotton in the South, paying for it in Confederate bonds, and using it as a basis for a foreign loan. The bill passed the house, but was defeated in the senate, and created so much indignation among the planters that Phelan was burned in effigy, and defeated in the next election. After 1864, Phelan served as judge advocate till the end of the war, when he settled in Memphis, Tennessee, and practised law in a firm formed with Henry T. Ellett in that city until his death.

He was interred in Aberdeen, Mississippi, following his death at the age of 51.

== Personal life ==
His brother, John Dennis Phelan, was a noted lawyer, jurist and politician. His son James Phelan Jr. became a congressman.

== Notes ==
Confederate States Senate
New constituency	Confederate States Senator (Class 1) from Mississippi; 1862–1864; Served alongside: Albert Brown	Succeeded by John Watson
