= 1840 North Carolina gubernatorial election =

- August 6, 1840
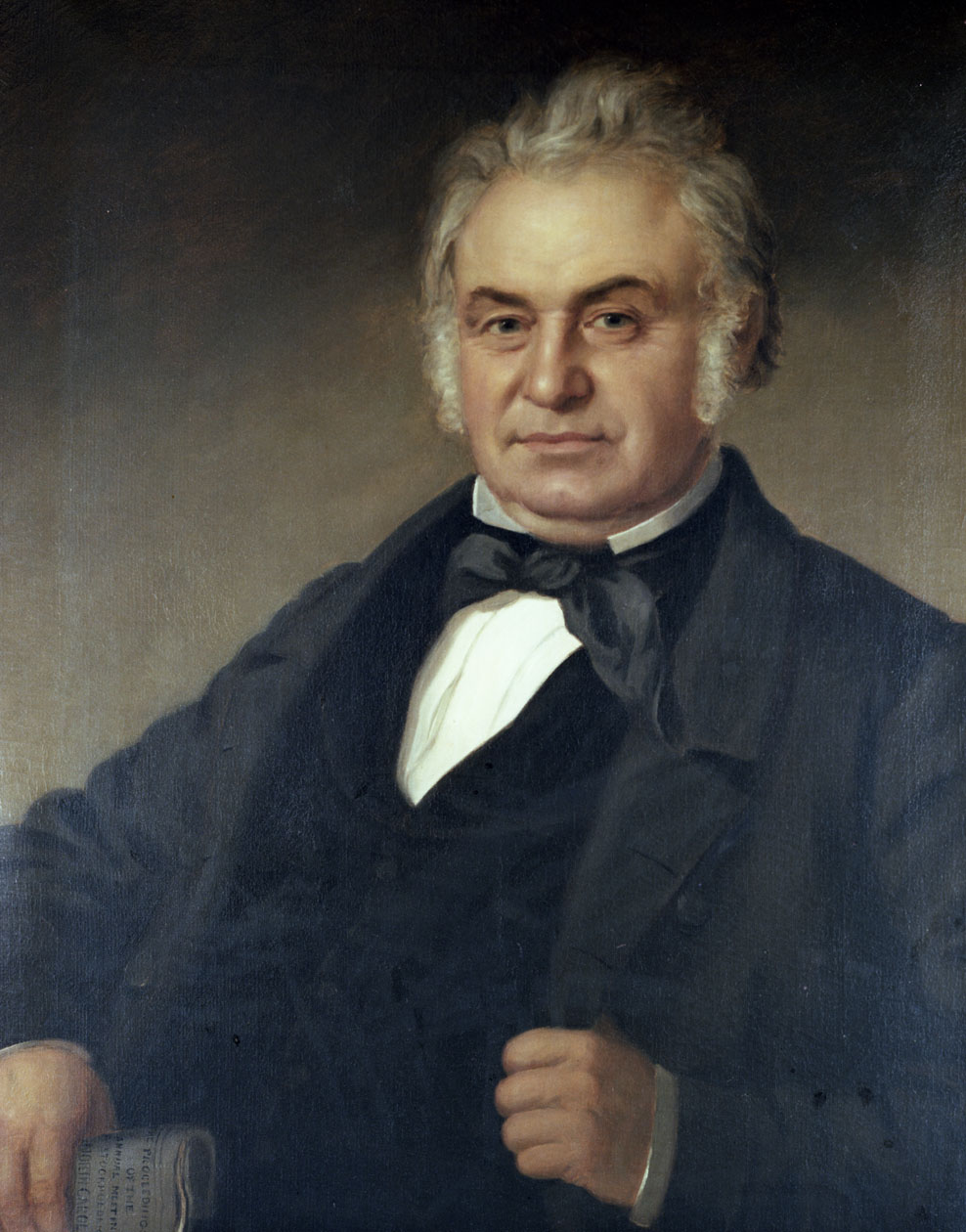

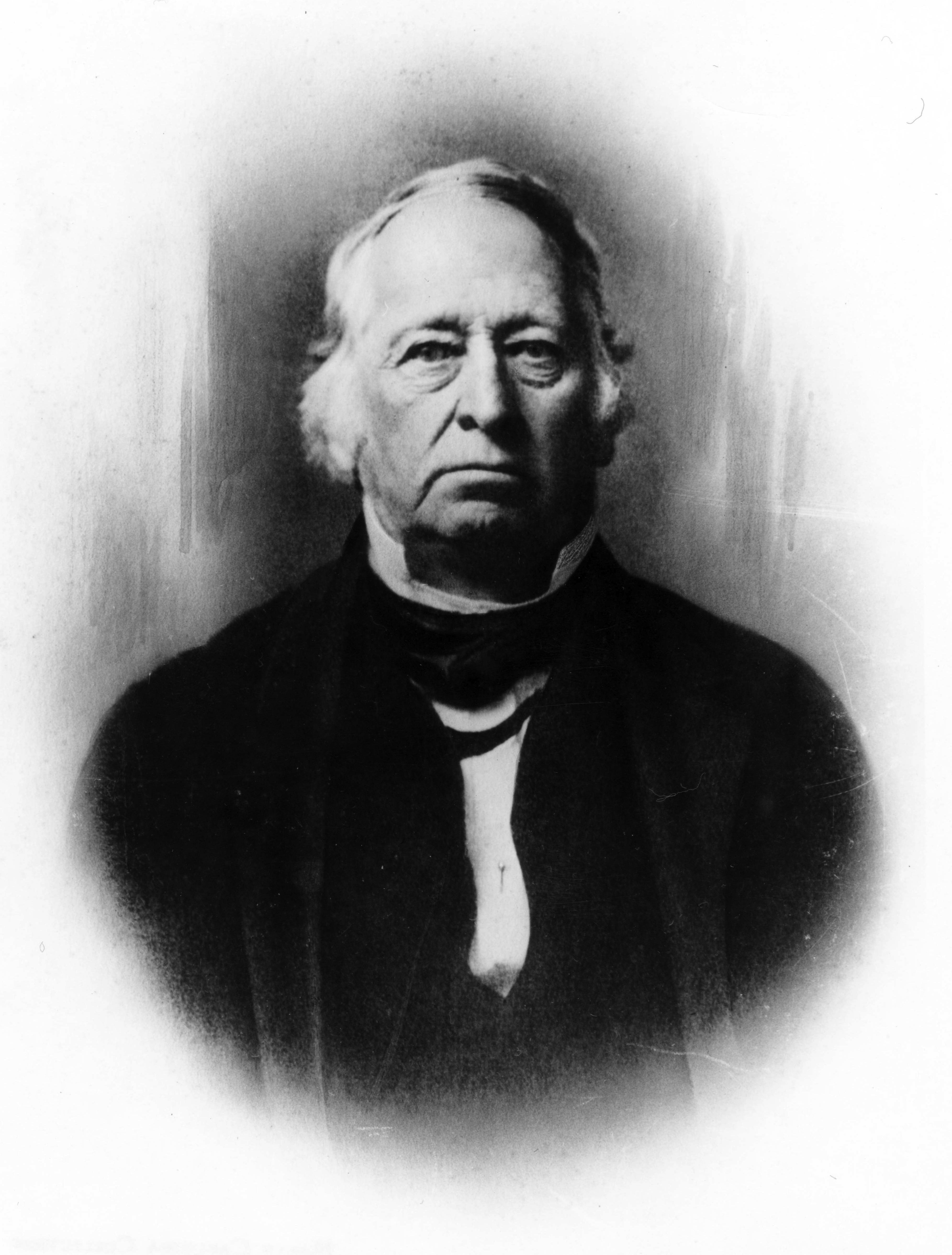
Nominee	John Motley Morehead	Romulus M. Saunders
Party	Whig	Democratic
Popular vote	44,484	35,903
Percentage	55.33%	44.67%
- County results Morehead: 50–60% 60–70% 70–80% 80–90% 90–100% Saunders: 50–60% 60–70% 70–80% 80–90% 90–100%
Governor before election
Edward Bishop Dudley
Whig
Elected Governor
John Motley Morehead
Whig

The 1840 North Carolina gubernatorial election was held on August 6, 1840, in order to elect the Governor of North Carolina. Whig nominee and former member of the North Carolina House of Representatives John Motley Morehead defeated Democratic nominee and former Attorney General of North Carolina Romulus M. Saunders.

== General election ==
On election day, August 6, 1840, Whig nominee John Motley Morehead won the election by a margin of 8,581 votes against his opponent Democratic nominee Romulus M. Saunders, thereby retaining Whig control over the office of Governor. Morehead was sworn in as the 29th Governor of North Carolina on January 1, 1841.

=== Results ===
North Carolina gubernatorial election, 1840
Party	Candidate	Votes	%
Whig	John Motley Morehead	44,484	55.33
Democratic	Romulus M. Saunders	35,903	44.67
Total votes		80,387	100.00
Whig hold			
