= 1840 Missouri gubernatorial election =

- August 3, 1840
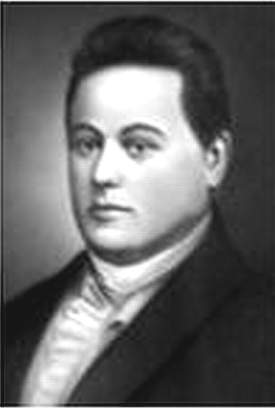

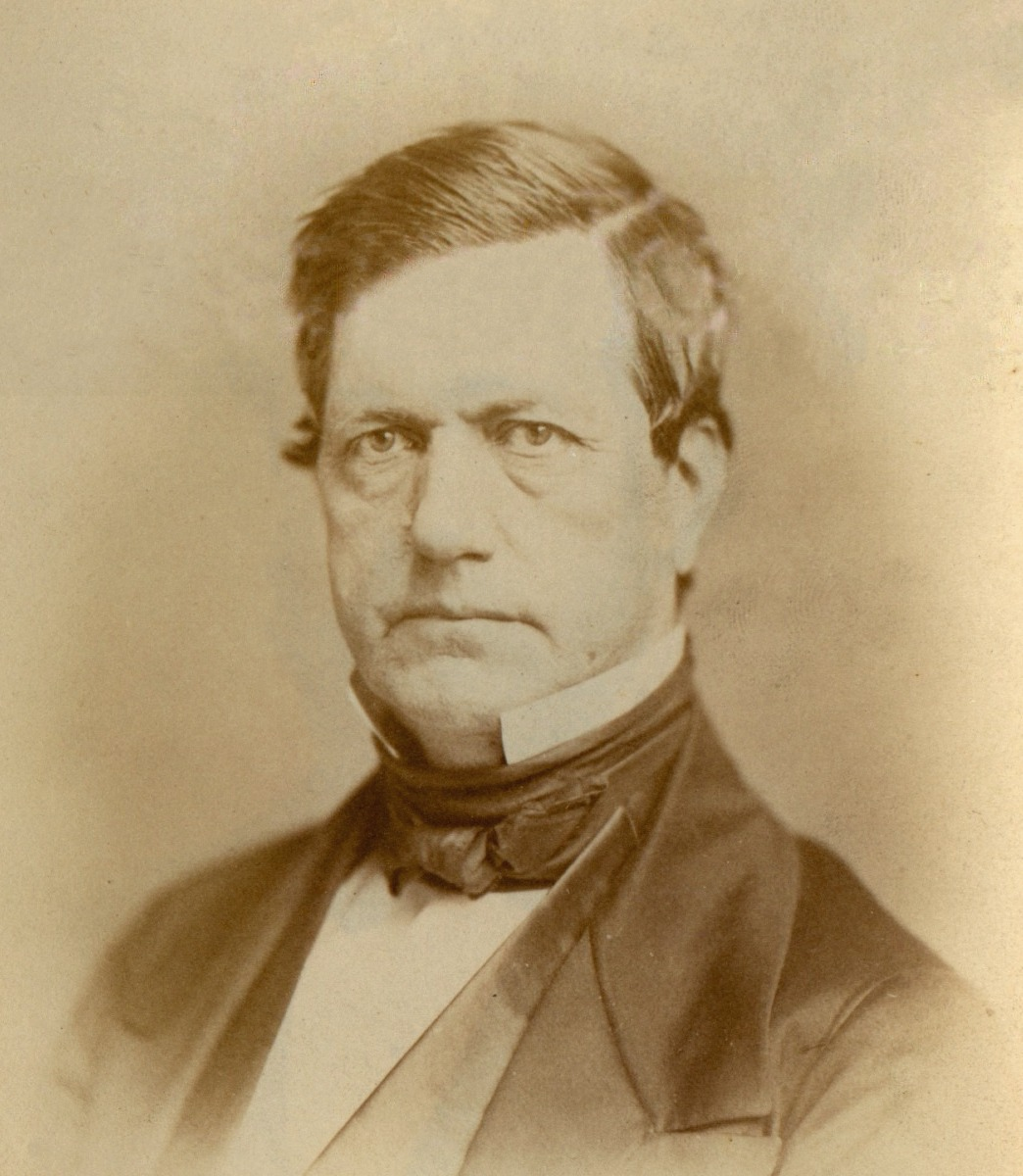
Nominee	Thomas Reynolds	John Bullock Clark
Party	Democratic	Whig
Popular vote	29,625	22,212
Percentage	57.15%	42.85%
- County results Reynolds: 50–60% 60–70% 70–80% 80–90% 90–100% Clark: 50–60% 60–70% No Data/Vote
Governor before election
Lilburn Boggs
Democratic
Elected Governor
Thomas Reynolds
Democratic

The 1840 Missouri gubernatorial election was held on August 3, 1840. In the election, Democrat Thomas Reynolds defeated Whig candidate John Bullock Clark.

== General election ==
=== Candidates ===
- John Bullock Clark, major general in the Missouri militia during the Mormon War (Whig)
- Thomas Reynolds, judge for the Second Judicial District (Democratic)

=== Results ===
1840 gubernatorial election, Missouri
Party	Candidate	Votes	%	±%
Democratic	Thomas Reynolds	29,625	57.15	+4.85
Whig	John Bullock Clark	22,212	42.85	+42.85
Majority		7,413	14.30	+9.70
Turnout		51,837	13.51	
Democratic hold		Swing		

== Aftermath ==
Thomas Reynolds would not live for the full length of this term, committing suicide on February 9, 1844, and being replaced by Lt. Governor Meredith Miles Marmaduke.
