= National Register of Historic Places listings in Cooper County, Missouri =

Location of Cooper County in Missouri

This is a list of the National Register of Historic Places listings in Cooper County, Missouri.

This is intended to be a complete list of the properties and districts on the National Register of Historic Places in Cooper County, Missouri, United States. Latitude and longitude coordinates are provided for many National Register properties and districts; these locations may be seen together in a map.

There are 44 properties and districts listed on the National Register in the county, including one National Historic Landmark.

This National Park Service list is complete through NPS recent listings posted November 6, 2026.

== Current listings ==
	Name on the Register	Image	Date listed	Location	City or town	Description
1	Andrews-Wing House	Andrews-Wing House	March 16, 1990 (#82005304)	733 Main St. 38°58′17″N 92°44′33″W	Boonville	
2	Arrow Rock	Arrow Rock	October 15, 1966 (#66000422)	Arrow Rock State Park; 39°04′00″N 92°56′41″W	Arrow Rock	
3	William S. and Mary Beckett House	William S. and Mary Beckett House	March 16, 1990 (#82005288)	821 Third St. 38°58′08″N 92°44′43″W	Boonville	
4	Blackwater Commercial Historic District	Blackwater Commercial Historic District	January 20, 2005 (#04001520)	100 Blk. of Main St., except for 118,120 and 122 Main St. 38°58′57″N 92°59′26″W	Blackwater	
5	Blackwater Residential Historic District	Blackwater Residential Historic District	September 5, 2009 (#09000597)	Parts of the 300-400 block of Trigg Ave., 300 block of Scott Ave. and the 300 block of Main St. 38°58′49″N 92°59′28″W	Blackwater	
6	Albert Gallatin Blakey House	Albert Gallatin Blakey House	March 16, 1990 (#82005289)	226 W. Spring St. 38°58′24″N 92°45′10″W	Boonville	
7	Boller House		August 2, 1977 (#77000803)	223 E. Spring St. 38°58′30″N 92°44′50″W	Boonville	Demolished.
8	Cobblestone Street	Cobblestone Street	March 16, 1990 (#82005293)	100 Main St. 38°58′41″N 92°44′40″W	Boonville	
9	John S. Dauwalter House	John S. Dauwalter House	March 16, 1990 (#82005296)	817 Seventh St. 38°58′14″N 92°44′22″W	Boonville	
10	Dick-Kobel Homestead		September 9, 1982 (#82003133)	W of Jamestown; 38°44′48″N 92°35′33″W	Jamestown	
11	Duke and Mary Diggs House	Duke and Mary Diggs House	March 16, 1990 (#82005297)	1217 Rural St. 38°58′48″N 92°44′00″W	Boonville	
12	Fessler-Secongost House		March 16, 1990 (#82005335)	119 W. Morgan St. 38°58′32″N 92°45′02″W	Boonville	
13	Andrew Gantner House	Andrew Gantner House	March 16, 1990 (#82005303)	1308 Sixth St. 38°57′52″N 92°44′18″W	Boonville	
14	Hamilton-Brown Shoe Company Building	Hamilton-Brown Shoe Company Building	March 16, 1990 (#82005305)	301 1st Street; 38°58′29″N 92°45′01″W	Boonville	
15	Harley Park Archeological Site		October 15, 1970 (#70000329)	Address Restricted	Boonville	
16	Historic District A	Historic District A	January 24, 1983 (#83000979)	Vine and 2nd Sts. 38°58′15″N 92°44′48″W	Boonville	A boundary increase was approved July 24, 2024.
17	Historic District B	Historic District B	January 24, 1983 (#83000980)	4th and E. Spring Sts. 38°58′26″N 92°44′40″W	Boonville	
18	Historic District C	Historic District C	January 24, 1983 (#83000981)	E. High and 4th Sts; 38°58′33″N 92°44′48″W	Boonville	
19	Historic District D	Historic District D	January 24, 1983 (#83000982)	High and Main Sts. 38°58′32″N 92°44′37″W	Boonville	
20	Historic District E	Historic District E	January 24, 1983 (#83000983)	High, Spring and Morgan Sts. 38°58′38″N 92°44′25″W	Boonville	
21	Historic District F	Historic District F	January 24, 1983 (#83000984)	Extends North and South along 6th and 7th Sts. 38°58′20″N 92°44′24″W	Boonville	
22	Historic District H	Historic District H	January 24, 1983 (#83000985)	SE corner of E. Morgan St. and Reformatory Dr. 38°58′35″N 92°43′50″W	Boonville	
23	Imhoff Archeological Site	Imhoff Archeological Site	August 7, 1972 (#72000710)	Address Restricted	Blackwater	
24	Juliet Trigg Johnson House	Juliet Trigg Johnson House	March 16, 1990 (#82005327)	1304 Main St. 38°57′50″N 92°44′24″W	Boonville	
25	Wilbur T. and Rhoda Stephens Johnson House	Wilbur T. and Rhoda Stephens Johnson House	March 16, 1990 (#82005322)	821 Main; 38°58′12″N 92°43′50″W	Boonville	
26	Lyric Theater	Lyric Theater	May 21, 1969 (#69000097)	NE corner of Main and Vine Sts. 38°58′26″N 92°44′33″W	Boonville	
27	Meierhoffer House	Meierhoffer House	March 16, 1990 (#82005317)	120 E. High St. 38°58′34″N 92°45′01″W	Boonville	
28	Meierhoffer Sand Company Office Building	Meierhoffer Sand Company Office Building	March 16, 1990 (#82005318)	201 Second St. 38°58′33″N 92°45′01″W	Boonville	Apparently no longer extant
29	Mellor Village and Mounds Archeological District		May 21, 1969 (#69000098)	Address Restricted	Lamine	Boundaries increased on August 7, 1974
30	Missouri, Kansas and Texas Railroad Depot	Missouri, Kansas and Texas Railroad Depot	March 16, 1990 (#82005312)	320 First St. 38°58′30″N 92°44′57″W	Boonville	
31	Morton-Myer House	Morton-Myer House	March 16, 1990 (#82005316)	1000 Eleventh St. 38°58′10″N 92°43′51″W	Boonville	
32	Mount Nebo Baptist Church		May 23, 1986 (#86001111)	MO 135/E; 38°48′12″N 92°53′22″W	Pilot Grove	
33	Thomas Nelson House	Thomas Nelson House	March 16, 1990 (#82005302)	700 Tenth St. 38°58′26″N 92°44′05″W	Boonville	
34	New Lebanon Cumberland Presbyterian Church and School		July 9, 1979 (#79001359)	MO A 38°45′53″N 92°56′20″W	New Lebanon	
35	New Lebanon Historic District		June 11, 1998 (#98000597)	Roughly, Area W and SE of jct of MO A and New Lebanon Loop; 38°46′28″N 92°56′21″W	New Lebanon	
36	Phoenix American Cob Pipe Factory	Phoenix American Cob Pipe Factory	November 14, 2019 (#100004604)	2nd & Vine Sts. 38°58′22″N 92°44′52″W	Boonville	
37	Josephine Trigg Pigott House	Josephine Trigg Pigott House	March 16, 1990 (#82005328)	1307 Sixth St. 38°57′52″N 92°44′21″W	Boonville	
38	Pleasant Green		July 29, 1977 (#77000804)	8 miles SW of Pilot Grove on U.S. 135; 38°48′11″N 92°59′15″W	Pilot Grove	
39	Prairie View	Prairie View	September 20, 1982 (#82003134)	E of Pleasant Green off MO 135; 38°47′36″N 92°55′51″W	Pleasant Green	
40	Ravenswood	Ravenswood	February 24, 1975 (#75001065)	NW of Bunceton on MO 5; 38°49′19″N 92°50′17″W	Bunceton	
41	Roeschel-Toennes-Oswald Property	Roeschel-Toennes-Oswald Property	July 7, 1983 (#83000986)	Santa Fe Trail at West End Drive; 38°58′22″N 92°45′22″W	Boonville	
42	St. Matthew's Chapel A.M.E. Church	St. Matthew's Chapel A.M.E. Church	March 16, 1990 (#82005324)	309 Spruce St. 38°58′14″N 92°44′41″W	Boonville	
43	Sumner Public School	Sumner Public School	March 16, 1990 (#82005331)	321 Spruce St. 38°58′14″N 92°44′39″W	Boonville	
44	Wooldridge Archeological Site		December 2, 1970 (#70000330)	Address Restricted	Wooldridge	

== See also ==
- List of National Historic Landmarks in Missouri
- National Register of Historic Places listings in Missouri
