= Boller =

Boller is a surname. Notable people with the surname include:

- Alfred P. Boller (1840–1912), American civil engineer and bridge designer
- Craig Boller (born 1948), American footballer
- Heinrich Boller (1921–2007), Swiss ice hockey player
- Jan Boller (born 2000), German footballer
- Juliana Boller (born 1986), Brazilian actress
- Kyle Boller (born 1981), American footballer
- Pat Boller (born 1972), American ice hockey coach and executive
- Ronda Boller, American politician
- Sascha Boller (born 1984), German footballer
- Walter Boller (born 1951), German athlete

== See also ==
- Boller and Chivens, manufacturer of telescopes and spectrographs
- Boller Brothers, architects
- Boller House, historic home in Boonville, Missouri
- W. H. Boller Meat Market and Residence, historic building in Lomira, Wisconsin
