= Meierhoffer Sand Company Office Building =

- U.S. National Register of Historic Places
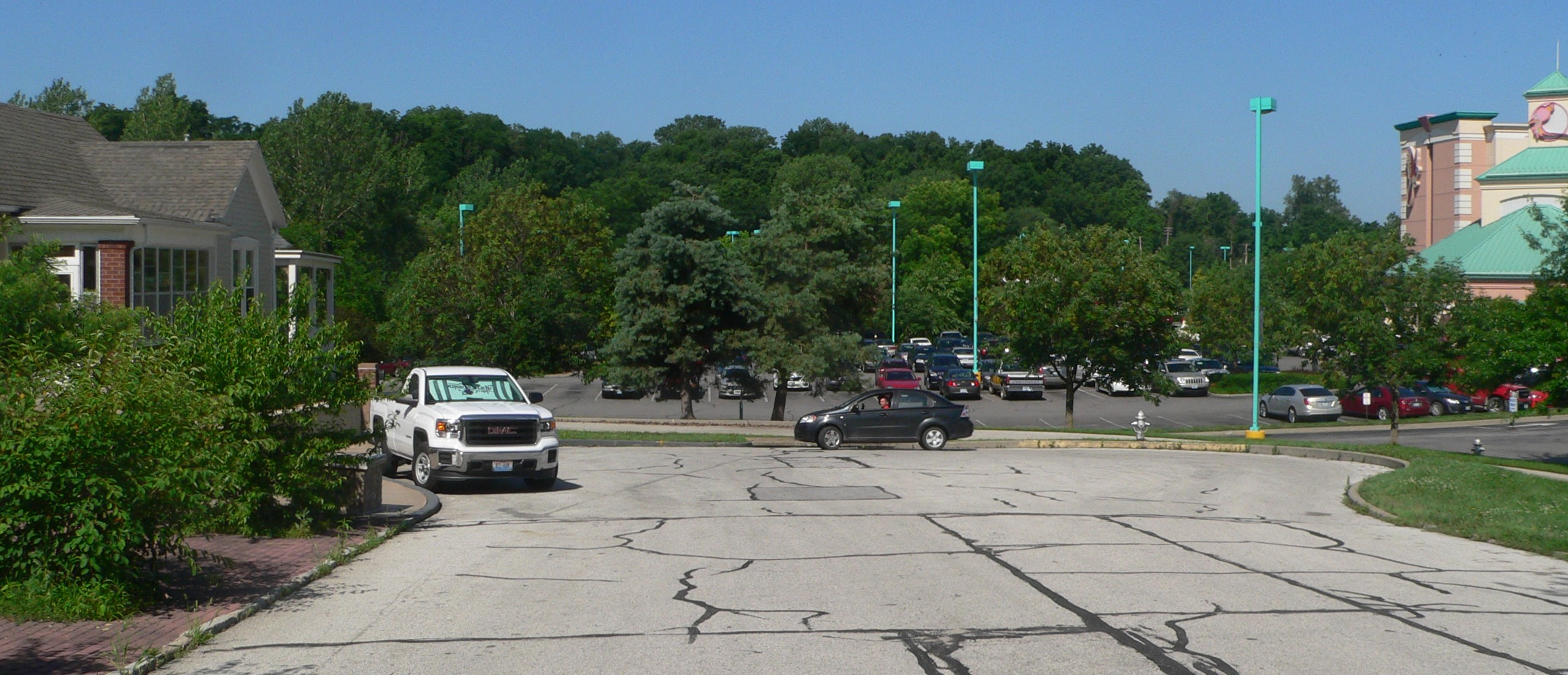
- Boonville, Missouri High Street E of 2nd facing WSW, June 2015

- Location within Missouri Location within the United States
- Location: 201 Second St., Boonville, Missouri
- Coordinates: 38°58′33″N 92°45′1″W
- Area: less than one acre
- Built: 1900
- Architectural style: Vernacular brick
- MPS: Boonville Missouri MRA
- NRHP reference No.: 82005318
- Added to NRHP: March 16, 1990

Meierhoffer Sand Company Office Building was a historic office building located at Boonville, Cooper County, Missouri. It was built about 1900, and was a one-story, rectangular vernacular brick building with a gable roof. An addition was constructed about 1910 which housed a wagon scale. By 1929, the building had been used as a grocery store and was later converted to a dwelling. It has apparently been demolished.

It was listed on the National Register of Historic Places in 1990.

== See also ==
- Meierhoffer House
- National Register of Historic Places listings in Cooper County, Missouri
