= Meierhoffer House =

Historic house in Missouri, United States

- U.S. National Register of Historic Places
- Location within Missouri Location within the United States
- Location: 120 E. High St., Boonville, Missouri
- Coordinates: 38°58′34″N 92°45′1″W
- Area: less than one acre
- Built: c. 1900
- Architectural style: Vernacular brick
- MPS: Boonville Missouri MRA
- NRHP reference No.: 82005317
- Added to NRHP: March 16, 1990

Meierhoffer House is a historic home located at Boonville, Cooper County, Missouri. It was built about 1900, and is a one-story, vernacular brick dwelling with a central hall plan. It has a gable roof, arched window and door headers, and partially expose basement.

It was listed on the National Register of Historic Places in 1990.

== See also ==
- Meierhoffer Sand Company Office Building
- National Register of Historic Places listings in Cooper County, Missouri
