= Missouri, Kansas and Texas Railroad Depot =

Missouri, Kansas and Texas Railroad Depot may refer to:

- Missouri, Kansas and Texas Railroad Depot (Boonville, Missouri), listed on the NRHP in Missouri
- Missouri, Kansas, and Texas Railroad Depot (Columbia, Missouri), listed on the NRHP in Missouri
- Missouri, Kansas and Texas Railroad Depot (Sedalia, Missouri), listed on the NRHP in Missouri
