= Historic District D =

United States historic place in Boonville, Cooper County, Missouri

- U.S. National Register of Historic Places
- U.S. Historic district
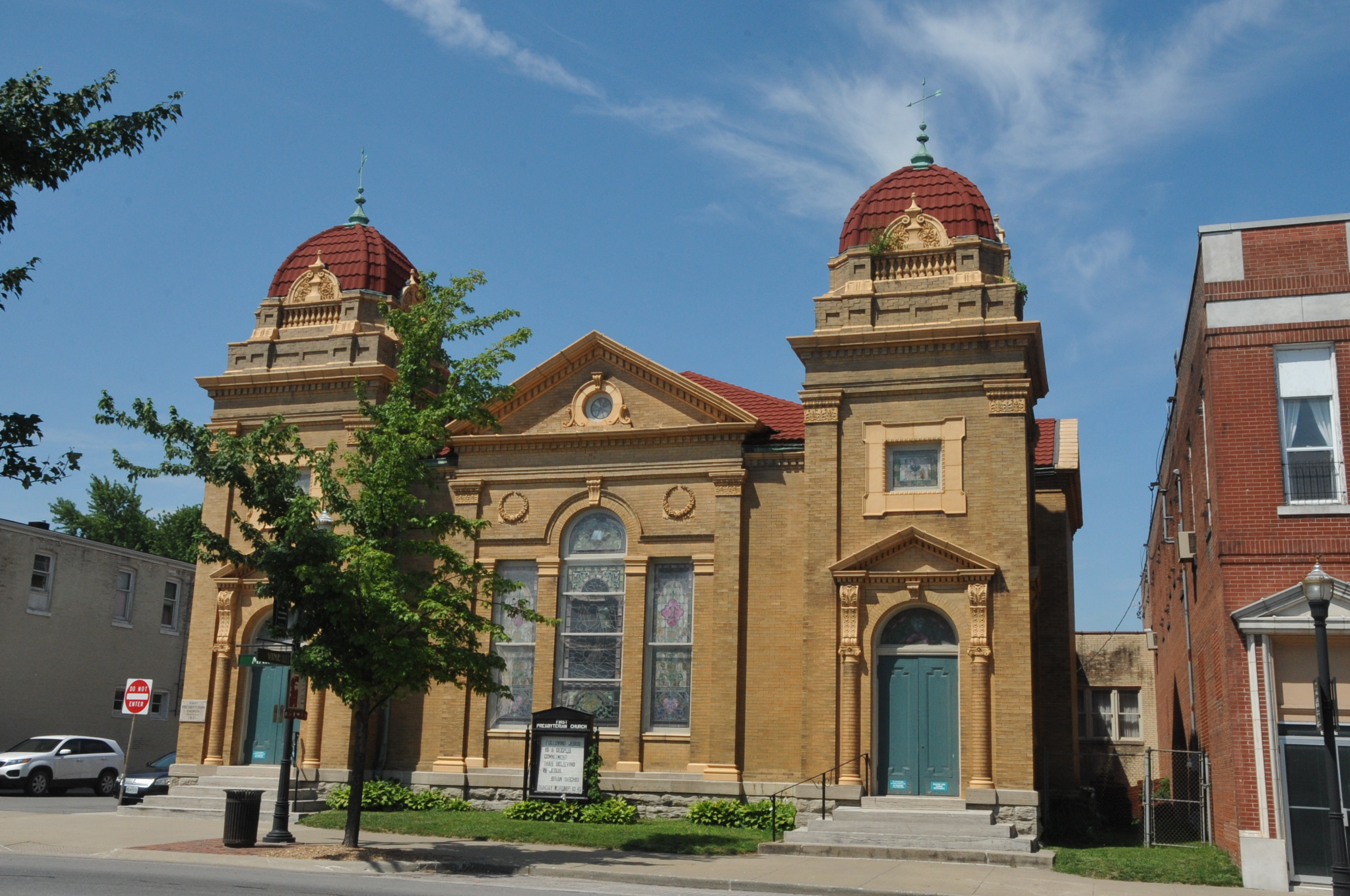
- First Presbyterian Church, July 2013

- Location within Missouri Location within the United States
- Location: High and Main Sts., Boonville, Missouri
- Coordinates: 38°58′32″N 92°44′37″W
- Area: 18.2 acres (7.4 ha)
- Architectural style: Late Victorian, Missouri German
- MPS: Boonville Missouri MRA
- NRHP reference No.: 83000982
- Added to NRHP: January 24, 1983

Historic District D is a national historic district located at Boonville, Cooper County, Missouri. It encompasses 87 contributing buildings in the central business district of Boonville. The district includes representative examples of Late Victorian and Classical Revival style architecture. Located in the district is the separately listed Lyric Theater. Other notable buildings include the Geiger's Furniture and Appliance (1870s), Missouri Power and Light Co (1900-1910), Palace Restaurant and Cocktail Lounge (mid-1800s), Boonville Music Co. (1870s), Nelson Memorial Methodist Church (1915-1917), United Missouri Bank (1914), Knights of Pythias Building (1920), First Presbyterian Church (1833, 1904), P.N. Hirsch & Co. Department Store (1860s-1870s), Cooper County Recorder (mid-1800s), Cooper County Abstract and Insurance Co. (1910), and Cooper County Courthouse (1911-1912).

It was listed on the National Register of Historic Places in 1983.
