= Historic District F =

Historic district in Missouri, United States

- U.S. National Register of Historic Places
- U.S. Historic district
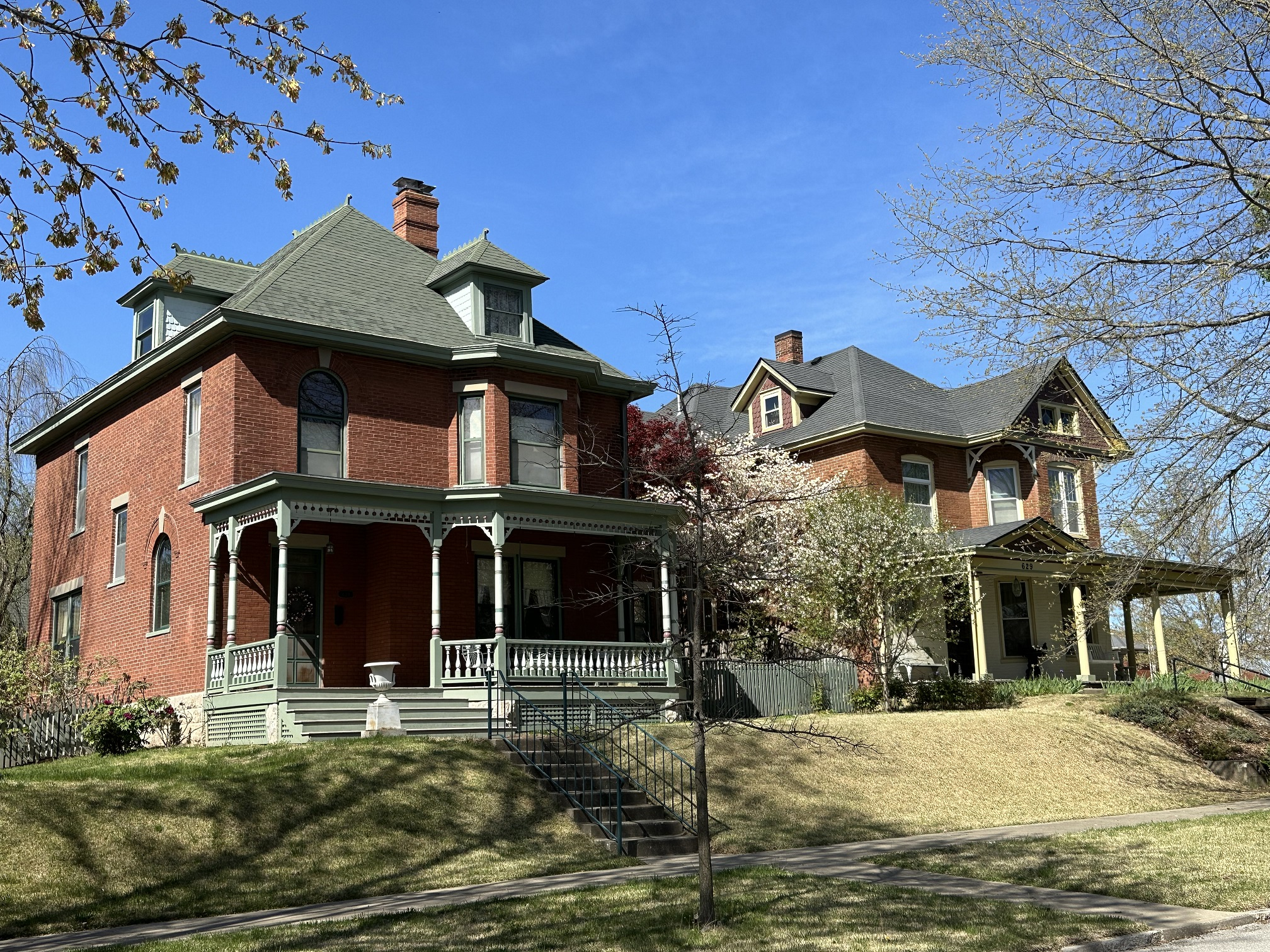

- Location within Missouri Location within the United States
- Location: Extends North and South along 6th and 7th Sts., Boonville, Missouri
- Coordinates: 38°58′20″N 92°44′24″W
- Area: 12.9 acres (5.2 ha)
- Architectural style: Greek Revival, Late Victorian, Missouri German
- MPS: Boonville Missouri MRA
- NRHP reference No.: 83000984
- Added to NRHP: January 24, 1983

Historic District F is a national historic district located at Boonville, Cooper County, Missouri. It encompasses 40 contributing buildings in a predominantly residential section of Boonville. The district includes representative examples of Greek Revival and Late Victorian style architecture. Notable buildings include the Gann-Ruddell Residence (1840–70, 1906), Weed Residence (1897), Weed Residence (1860s-1870s), Embry Residence (1853), Foursquare Gospel Church (1852, 1956), Heyssel Residence (1860s), Hayes Residence (1892-1900), Earhart Residence (1899), Maplewood Apartment (1892), and Smith/Whitehurse Residence (1850s-1860s).

It was listed on the National Register of Historic Places in 1983.
