= Andrew Gantner House =

Historic house in Missouri, United States

- U.S. National Register of Historic Places

- Location within Missouri Location within the United States
- Location: 1308 Sixth St., Boonville, Missouri
- Coordinates: 38°57′52″N 92°44′18″W
- Area: less than one acre
- Built: c. 1856
- Built by: Gantner, Andrew
- Architectural style: Vernacular stone
- MPS: Boonville Missouri MRA
- NRHP reference No.: 82005303
- Added to NRHP: March 16, 1990

Andrew Gantner House is a historic home located at Boonville, Cooper County, Missouri. It was built about 1856, and is a one-story, roughly cut and dressed sandstone block dwelling. It was enlarged by subsequent historic additions, both stone and frame, to a roughly U-shaped plan.

It was listed on the National Register of Historic Places in 1990.
