= Historic District C =

Historic district in Missouri, United States

- U.S. National Register of Historic Places
- U.S. Historic district
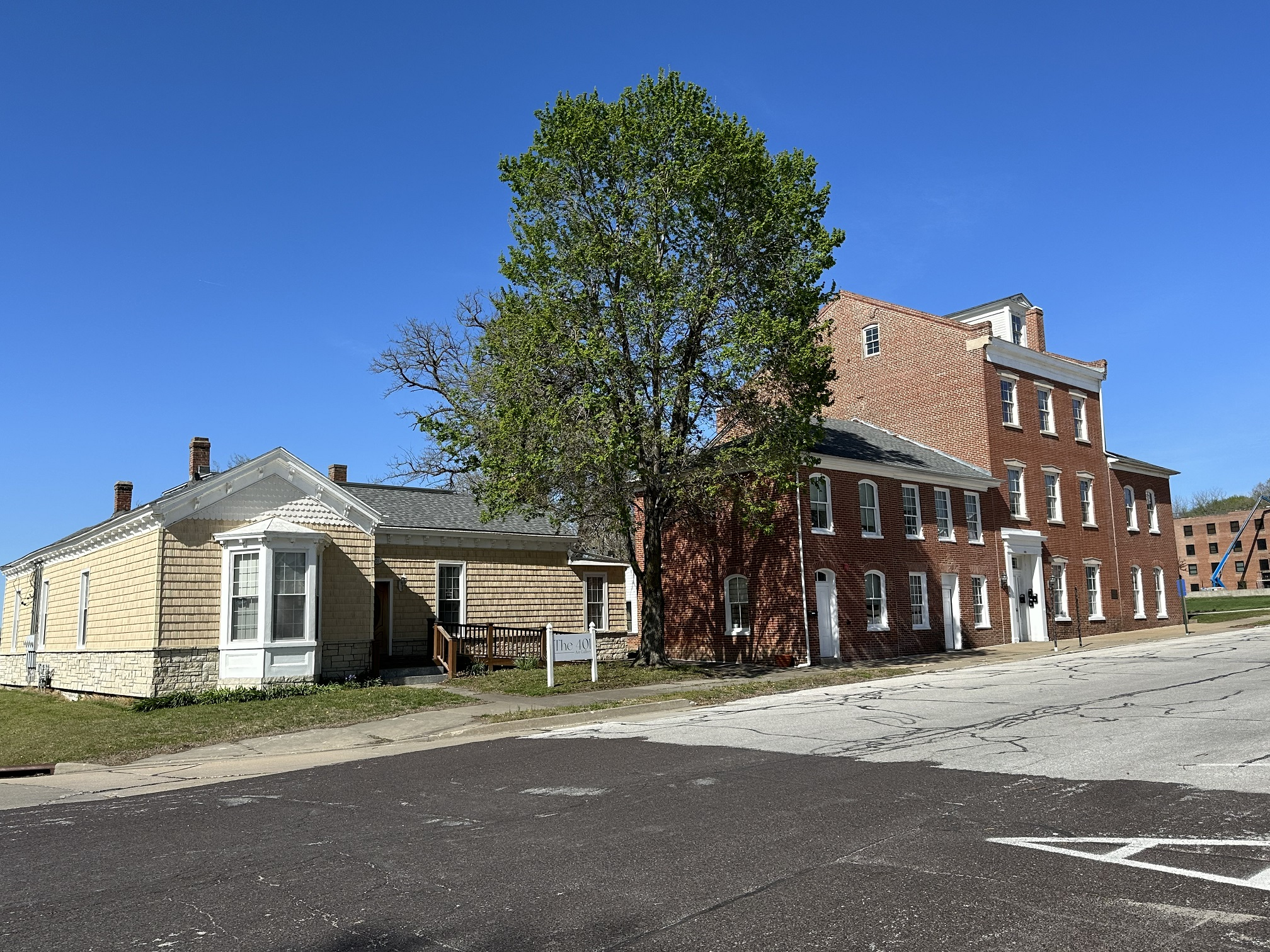

- Location within Missouri Location within the United States
- Location: E. High and 4th Sts. Boonville, Missouri
- Coordinates: 38°58′33″N 92°44′48″W
- Area: 15.5 acres (6.3 ha)
- Architectural style: Greek Revival, Queen Anne
- MPS: Boonville Missouri MRA
- NRHP reference No.: 83000981
- Added to NRHP: January 24, 1983

Historic District C is a national historic district located at Boonville, Cooper County, Missouri. It encompasses 63 contributing buildings in a predominantly residential section of Boonville. The district includes representative examples of Greek Revival and Queen Anne style architecture. Notable buildings include the Childers, Sr., Residence (1892-1900), Schmidt Residence (1915), Moore Residence (1880s), Holmes Property (1829-1843), Holmes Property (1829-1840), Patterson Residence (1869), Boonville Daily News Property (1910-1917), Higbee Residence (1911-1917), Knabe Rental Property (pre-1849), Catlett Property (1839), Bittner Residence (1900-1910), Putnam/Wiehe Residence (1836-1839), Cooper Residence (1860s), Travis Property (1850s-1860s), and Zoeller Property (c. 1850).

It was listed on the National Register of Historic Places in 1983.
