= Sumner Public School =

- U.S. National Register of Historic Places
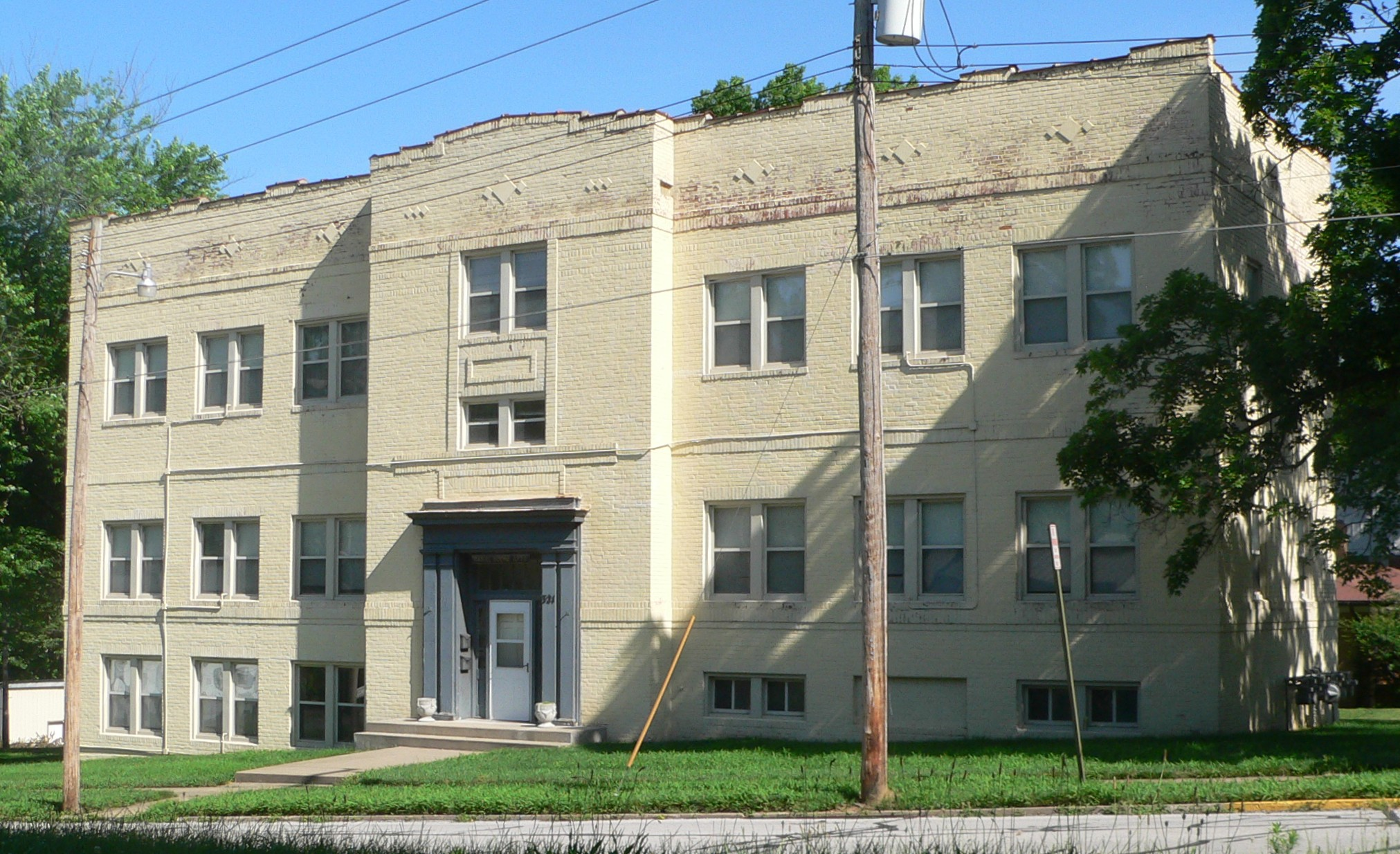
- Daniel Boone Apartments, June 2015

- Location within Missouri Location within the United States
- Location: 321 Spruce St., Boonville, Missouri
- Coordinates: 38°58′14″N 92°44′38″W
- Area: less than one acre
- Built: 1915
- Architect: Jones, James William
- Architectural style: Early 20th Cen. school
- MPS: Boonville Missouri MRA
- NRHP reference No.: 82005331
- Added to NRHP: March 16, 1990

Sumner Public School, also known as the Daniel Boone Apartments, is a historic school building located at Boonville, Cooper County, Missouri. It was built in 1915, and is a two-story, rectangular brick structure with a central projecting bay. The roof is framed by a stepped, corbelled parapet on the front facade. The school served as an African-American public school until converted into apartments in 1939–1940.

It was listed on the National Register of Historic Places in 1990.
