= St. Matthew's Chapel A.M.E. Church =

Historic church in Missouri, United States

- U.S. National Register of Historic Places
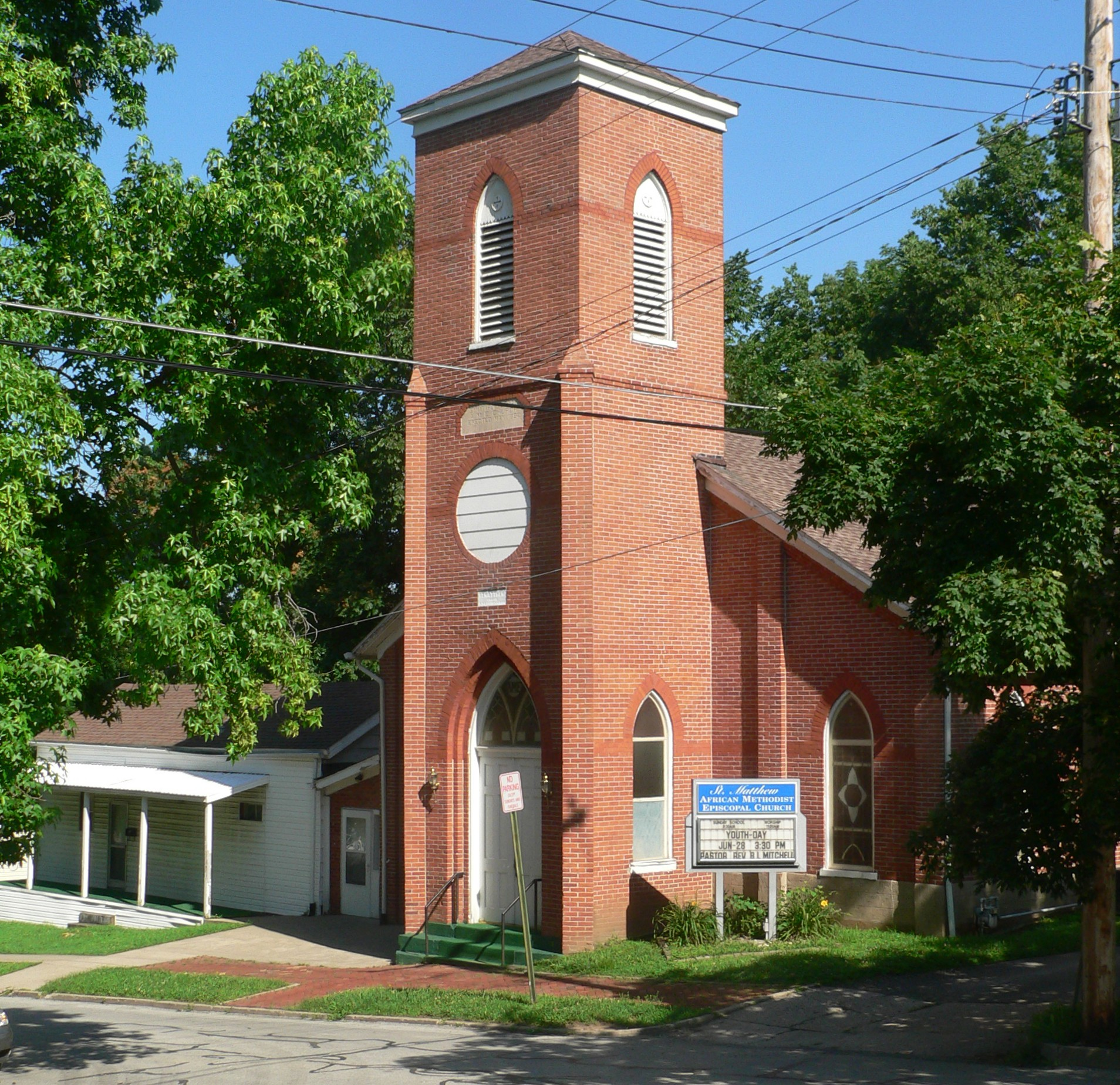

- Location within Missouri Location within the United States
- Location: 309 Spruce St., Boonville, Missouri
- Coordinates: 38.970437°N 92.744838°W
- Built: 1892
- Architectural style: Gothic Revival
- MPS: Boonville Missouri MRA
- NRHP reference No.: 82005324
- Added to NRHP: March 16, 1990

St. Matthew's Chapel A.M.E. Church is a historic African Methodist Episcopal church located at 309 Spruce Street in Boonville, Cooper County, Missouri. It was built in 1892, and is a one-story, rectangular, gable roofed Gothic Revival style brick church. It has a hipped roof three story projecting tower and a rectangular, hipped roof, brick apse attached to the rear.

It was listed on the National Register of Historic Places in 1990.
