= Historic District E =

Historic district in Missouri, United States

- U.S. National Register of Historic Places
- U.S. Historic district
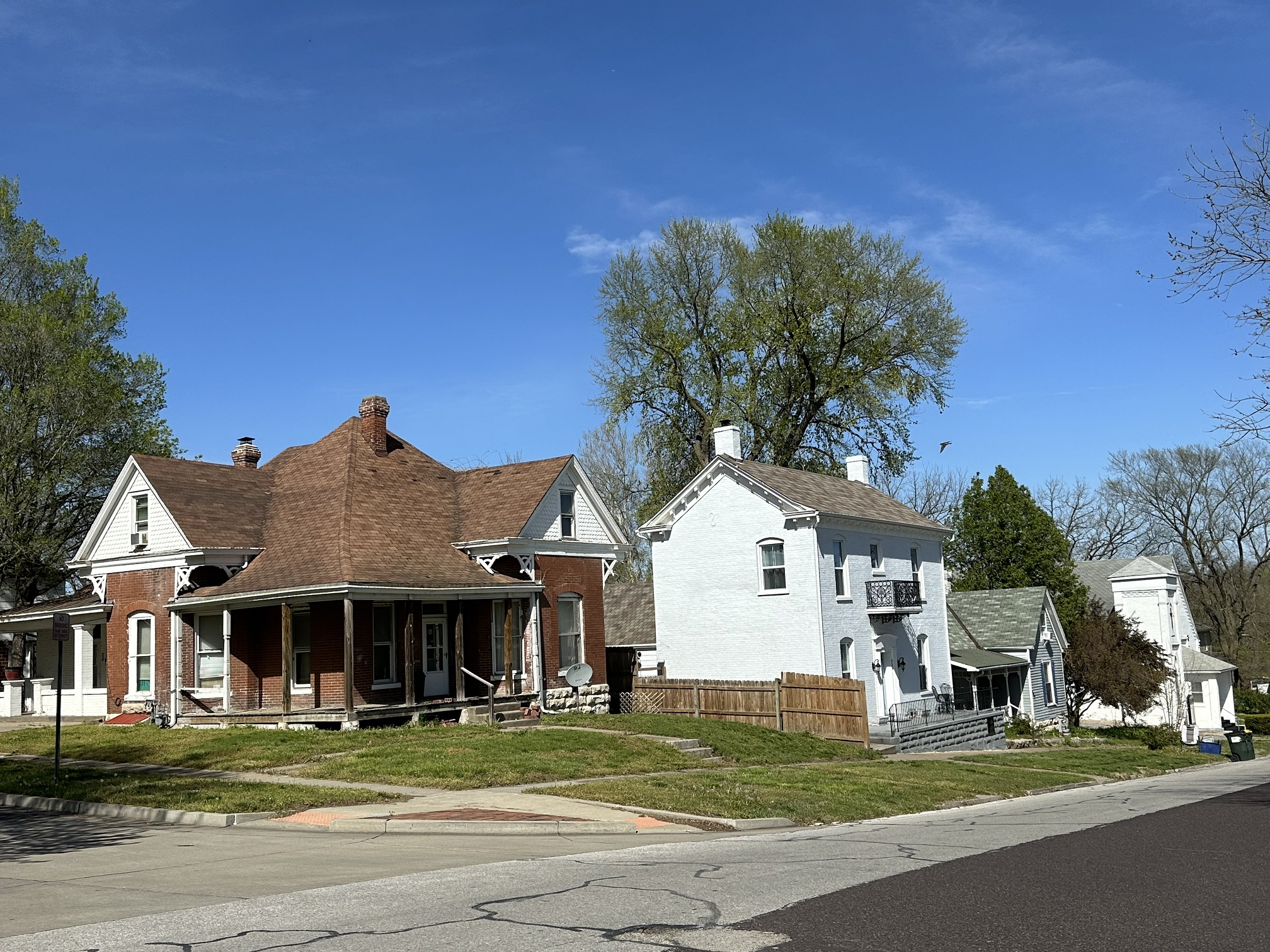

- Location within Missouri Location within the United States
- Location: High, Spring and Morgan Sts., Boonville, Missouri
- Coordinates: 38°58′38″N 92°44′25″W
- Area: 28.7 acres (11.6 ha)
- Architectural style: Late Victorian, Missouri German
- MPS: Boonville Missouri MRA
- NRHP reference No.: 83000983
- Added to NRHP: January 24, 1983

Historic District E is a national historic district located at Boonville, Cooper County, Missouri. It encompasses 88 contributing buildings in a predominantly residential section of Boonville. The district includes representative examples of Late Victorian style architecture. Notable buildings include the Dyer Residence (1870), Burns Residence (c. 1855), Rennison Residence (1890s), Lauer Residence (1830-1833), Robinson Residence (1905), Bell Residence (1886), Schuster Residence (1833), Kempf Residence (1890s), Cooper County Court Property (1847-1848, 1871), Morgan Street Baptist Church (1884), Waible Residence (1833-1848), and United Church of Christ (1887-1888, 1915–1916).

It was listed on the National Register of Historic Places in 1983.
