= Cathy Barton =

American folk musician (1955–2019)

- Born: Catherine Jean Barton; June 12, 1955; Fort Benning, Georgia
- Died: April 17, 2019 (aged 63); Boonville, Missouri
- Other name: Cathy Barton Para
- Occupations: Folk singer and musician
- Years active: 1975-2019
- Known for: Ozark traditional music
- Awards: Distinguished Alumnus, Stephens College, Columbia, Missouri 1993

Catherine Jean Barton Para was an American folk musician from Boonville, Missouri known for her performances of traditional Ozark music and her proficiency on the banjo and hammered dulcimer. For more than four decades she performed with her husband Dave Para. She performed at the Grand Ole Opry in Nashville, on the television show Hee Haw, and regularly at Boonville's Big Muddy Folk Festival, which she helped found.

== Early life and education ==
Barton was born the child of military parents in Fort Benning, Georgia. After living in Pennsylvania, Virginia, Hawaii, and Kentucky, her family settled in Columbia, Missouri where she graduated from Hickman High School. She received a Bachelor's degree from Stephens College in Columbia and a Master's degree in 1979 in folklore from Western Kentucky University.

== Discography ==
- Ballad of the Boonslick, with Dave Para (1982)
- On a Day Like Today, with Dave Para (1986)
- Twas On a Night Like This, A Christmas Legacy With the Paton Family, Dave Para, Ed Trickett, Skip Gorman and Gordon Bok (1992)
- For All the Good People, A Golden Ring Reunion with the Patons, Dave Para, Ed Trickett, and Harry Tuft (1991)
- Johnny Whistletrigger, Civil War Songs from the Western Border with Dave Para and Bob Dyer (1995)
- Rebel in the Woods, Civil War Songs from the Western Border Vol. II with Dave Para and Bob Dyer (1995)
- Crazy Quilt with Dave Para (1998)
- Living on the River with Dave Para (2000)
- Most Perfect Harmony, Lewis and Clark: A Musical Journey with the Discovery String Band (2003)
- Sabbath Home, with Dave Para (2006)
- The Wandering Fool, The Songs of Bob Dyer Sung in Tribute by His Friends (2008)
- Sweet Journeys, with Dave Para (2010)
- Gumbo Bottoms, a Big Muddy Musical (2014)
- Carp Fishing in America, with Dave Para (2017)
