= Fessler-Secongost House =

Historic house in Missouri, United States

- U.S. National Register of Historic Places
- Location within Missouri Location within the United States
- Location: 119 W. Morgan St., Boonville, Missouri
- Coordinates: 38°58′32″N 92°45′2″W
- Area: less than one acre
- Built: 1862
- Architectural style: Gothic Revival, Vernacular Gothic Revival
- MPS: Boonville Missouri MRA
- NRHP reference No.: 82005335
- Added to NRHP: March 16, 1990

Fessler-Secongost House is a historic home located at Boonville, Cooper County, Missouri. It was built about 1862, and is a 1 1/2-story, two-thirds-plan, vernacular Gothic Revival style brick dwelling. It has steeply pitched cross-gable roof with bracketed eaves and a rear ell.

It was listed on the National Register of Historic Places in 1990.
