= Historic District B =

Historic district in Missouri, United States

- U.S. National Register of Historic Places
- U.S. Historic district
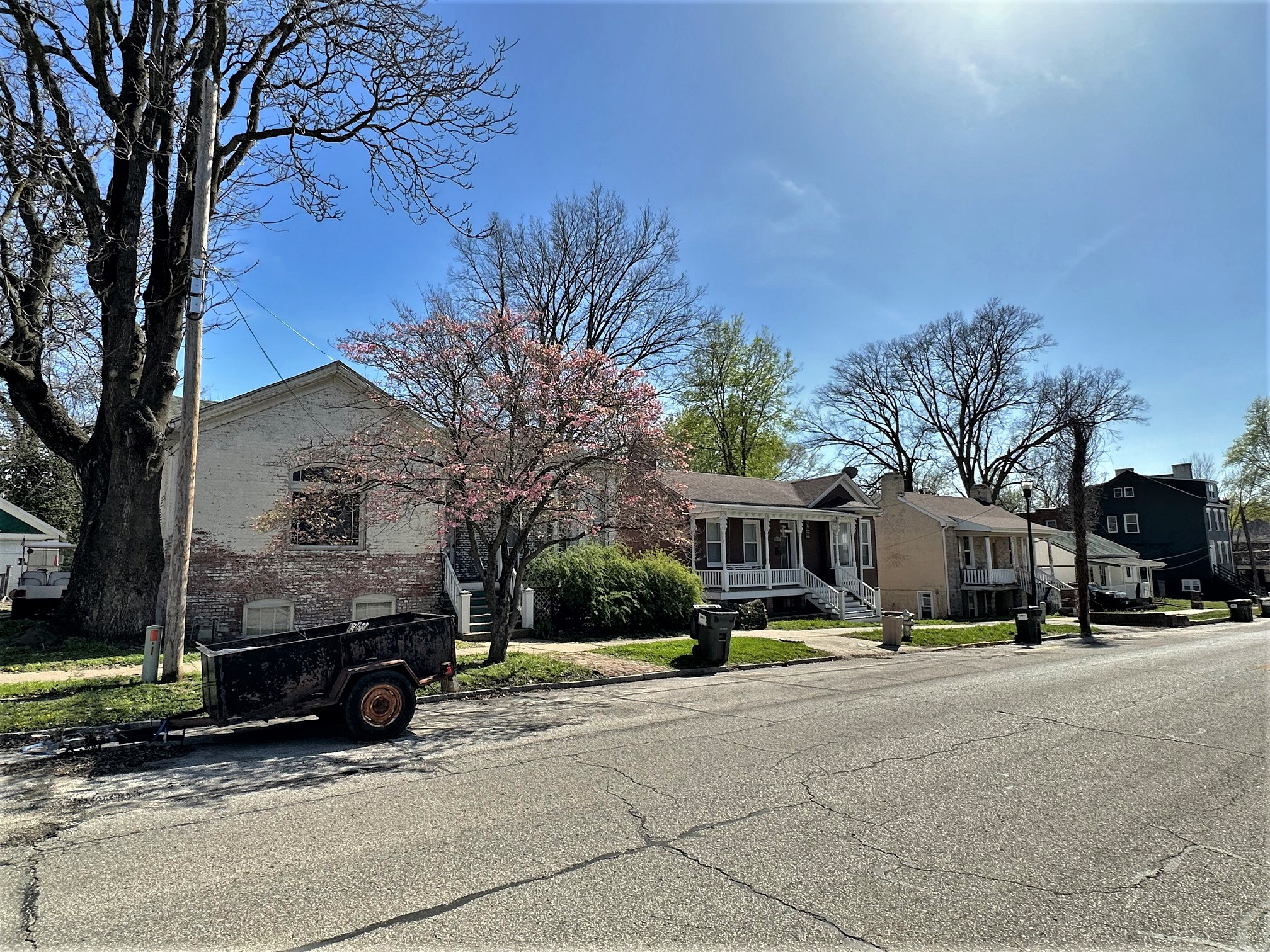

- Location within Missouri Location within the United States
- Location: 4th and E. Spring Sts., Boonville, Missouri
- Coordinates: 38°58′26″N 92°44′40″W
- Area: 6.1 acres (2.5 ha)
- Architectural style: Late 19th And 20th Century Revivals, Late Victorian
- MPS: Boonville Missouri MRA
- NRHP reference No.: 83000980
- Added to NRHP: January 24, 1983

Historic District B is a national historic district located at Boonville, Cooper County, Missouri. It encompasses 23 contributing buildings in a predominantly residential section of Boonville. The district includes representative examples of Late Victorian style architecture. Notable buildings include the Dukes Residence (1900-1910), Windsor Residence (c. 1910), Hofstedler Residence (1920-1925), Short Residence (1908), Hain Residence (1836-1840), Hickam Estate Property (1840s), Christ Church Episcopal (1844-1846), and Christ Church Episcopal (1870, 1908).

It was listed on the National Register of Historic Places in 1983.
