= William S. and Mary Beckett House =

Historic house in Missouri, United States

- U.S. National Register of Historic Places
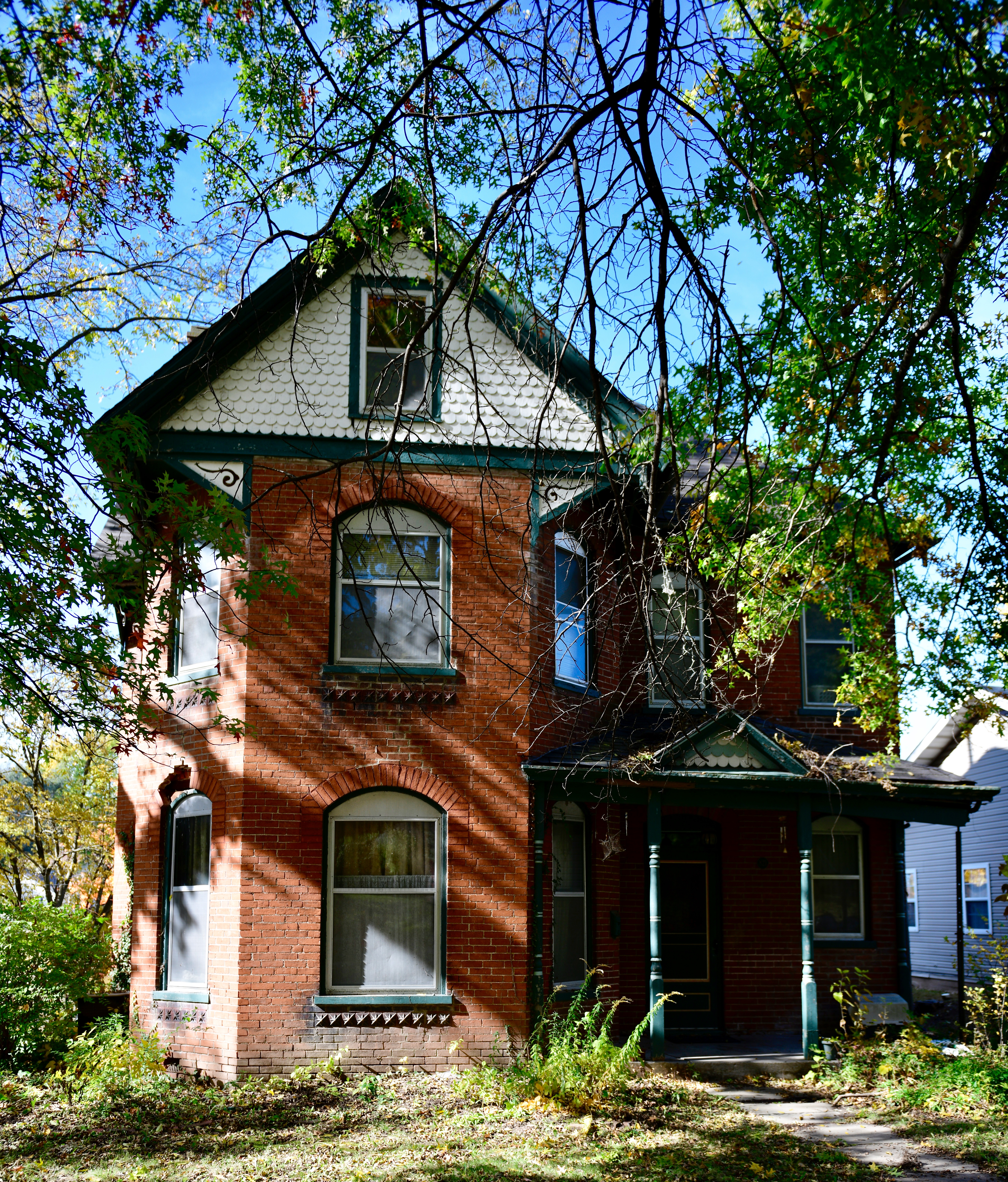

- Location within Missouri Location within the United States
- Location: 821 Third Street; Boonville, Missouri
- Coordinates: 38°58′8″N 92°44′43″W
- Area: less than one acre
- Built: 1903
- Architectural style: Queen Anne
- MPS: Boonville Missouri MRA
- NRHP reference No.: 82005288
- Added to NRHP: March 16, 1990

The William S. and Mary Beckett House is a historic house located in Boonville, Cooper County, Missouri. It was built in 1903, and is a 2 1/2-story, Queen Anne style brick dwelling. It has a complex, steep hipped and lower cross-gable roofs and projecting bays. It features decorative, terra cotta panels with a six-pointed star-like design.

It was listed on the National Register of Historic Places on March 16, 1990.
