= Duke and Mary Diggs House =

Historic house in Missouri, United States

- U.S. National Register of Historic Places
- Location within Missouri Location within the United States
- Location: 1217 Rural St., Boonville, Missouri
- Coordinates: 38°58′48″N 92°43′59″W
- Area: less than one acre
- Built: c. 1869
- Architectural style: Vernacular brick
- MPS: Boonville Missouri MRA
- NRHP reference No.: 82005297
- Added to NRHP: March 16, 1990

Duke and Mary Diggs House is a historic home located at Boonville, Cooper County, Missouri. It was built about 1869, and is a one-story, central hall plan, vernacular brick dwelling. It rests on rough cut stone foundation laid in regular courses and has a gable roof.

It was listed on the National Register of Historic Places in 1990.
