= Roeschel-Toennes-Oswald Property =

Historic house in Missouri, United States

- U.S. National Register of Historic Places
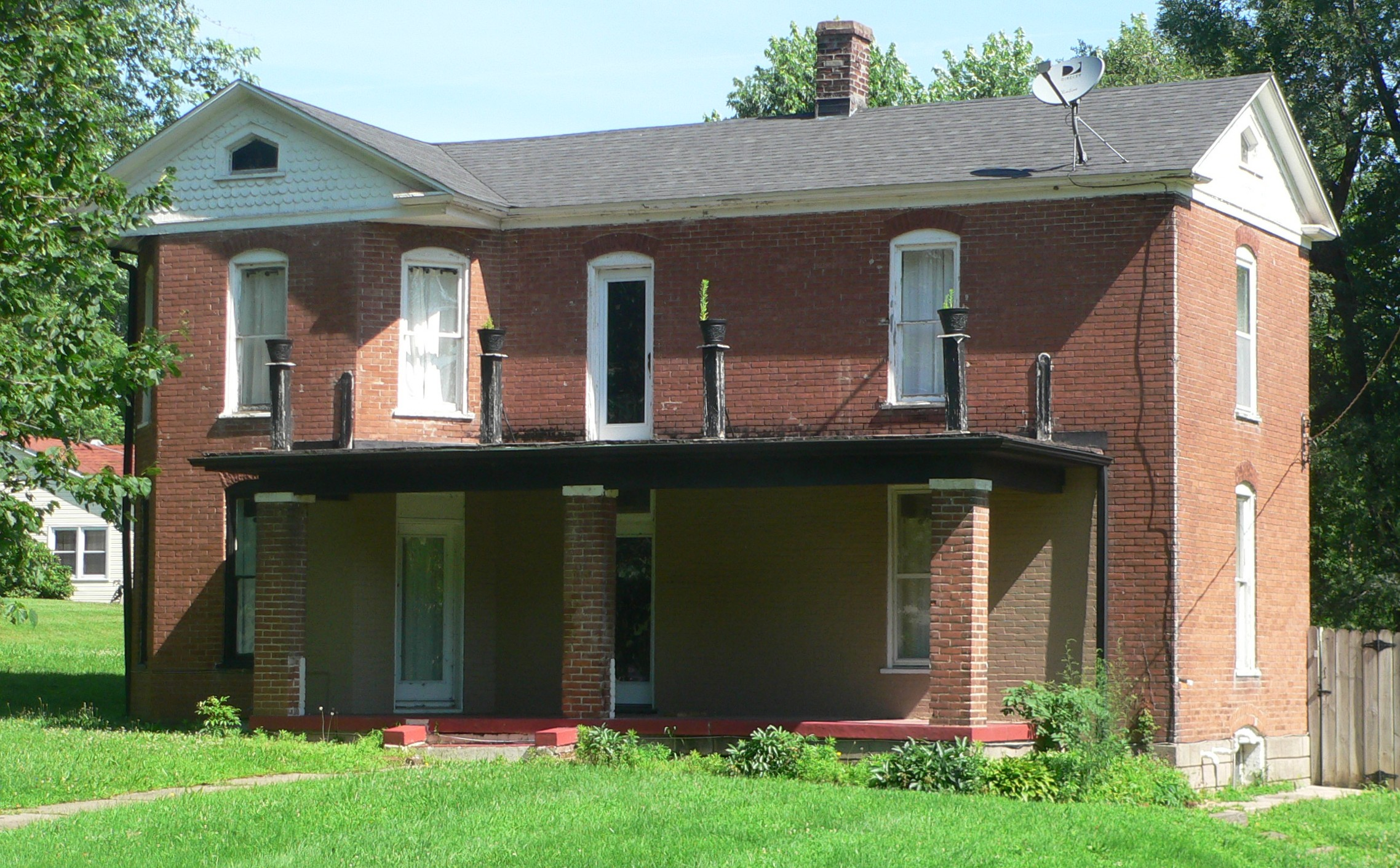
- Roeschel-Toennes-Oswald property, June 2015

- Location within Missouri Location within the United States
- Location: 515 W. Spring (Santa Fe Trail at West End Drive), Boonville, Missouri
- Coordinates: 38°58′21″N 92°45′21″W
- Area: less than one acre
- Built: 1905
- Architectural style: Queen Anne
- MPS: Boonville Missouri MRA
- NRHP reference No.: 83000986
- Added to NRHP: July 7, 1983

Roeschel-Toennes-Oswald Property, also known as the Oswald Farm and Boyce Property, a historic home located at Boonville, Cooper County, Missouri. The original section was built in the 1850s-1860s and tool its present form in 1905. It is a one- and two-story, frame and brick I-house form dwelling with Queen Anne design influences. It features a projecting two-story bay and shingled gables with returns.

It was listed on the National Register of Historic Places in 1983.
