= Albert Gallatin Blakey House =

Historic house in Missouri, United States

- U.S. National Register of Historic Places
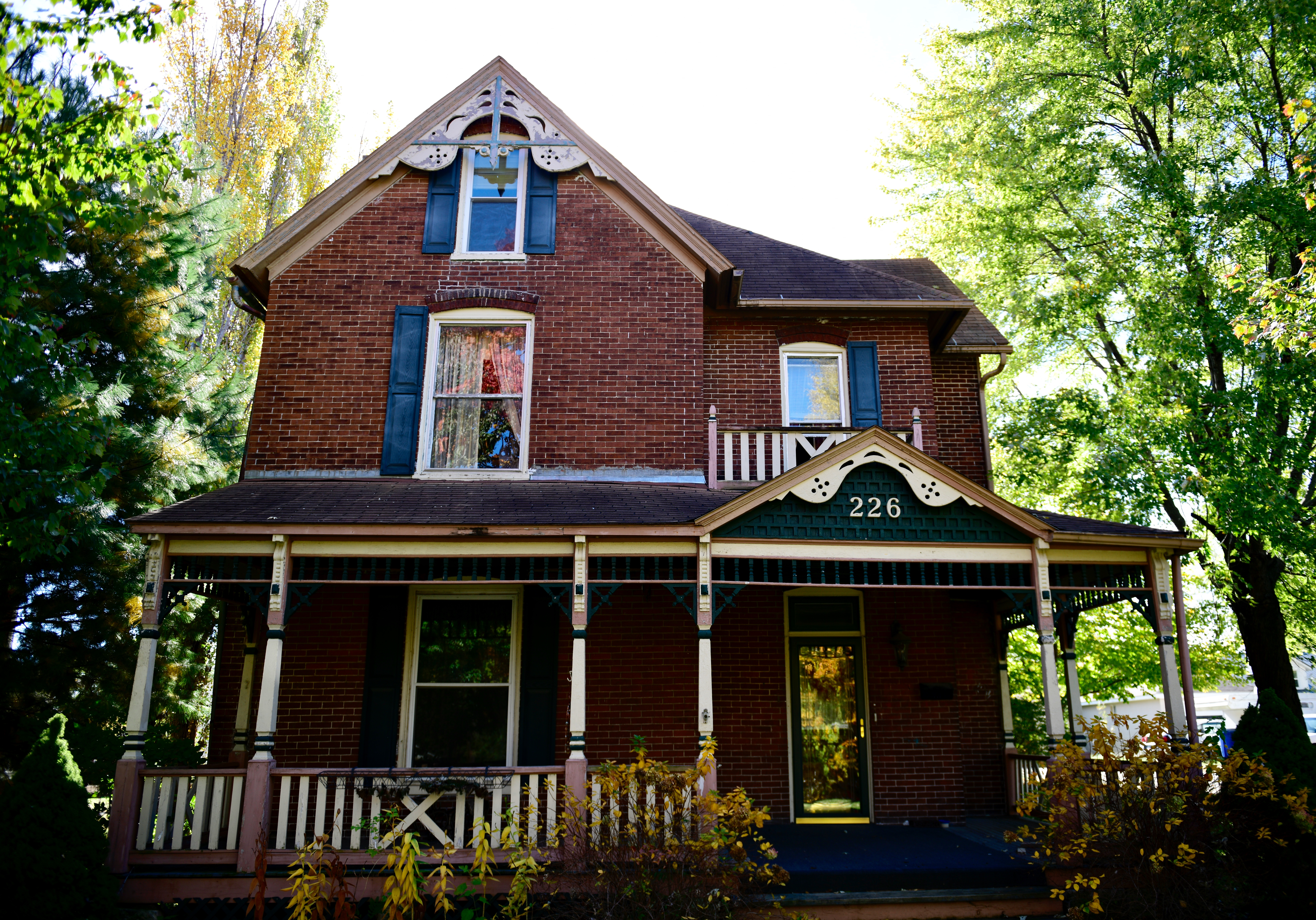

- Location within Missouri Location within the United States
- Location: 226 W. Spring St. Boonville, Missouri
- Coordinates: 38°58′24″N 92°45′10″W
- Area: less than one acre
- Built: c. 1900
- Architectural style: Queen Anne
- MPS: Boonville Missouri MRA
- NRHP reference No.: 82005289
- Added to NRHP: March 16, 1990

Albert Gallatin Blakey House is a historic home located at Boonville, Cooper County, Missouri. It was built about 1900, and is a 2 1/2-story, Queen Anne style brick dwelling. It has a two-story, rectangular brick addition with flat, parapeted roof and a two-story frame porch added about 1910.

It was listed on the National Register of Historic Places in 1990.
