= Morton–Myer House =

Historic house in Missouri, United States

- U.S. National Register of Historic Places
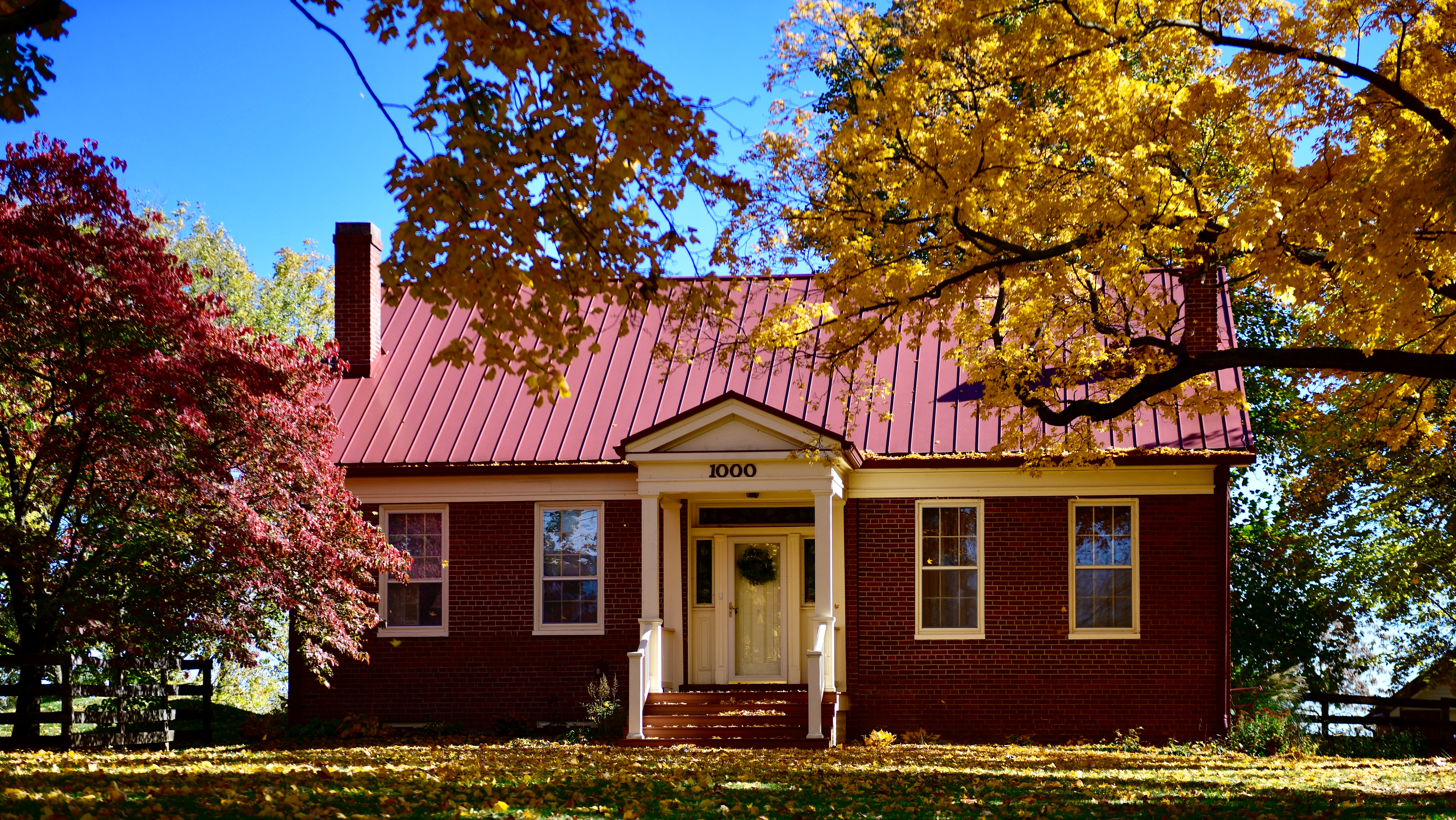

- Location within Missouri Location within the United States
- Location: 1000 Eleventh St. Boonville, Missouri
- Coordinates: 38°58′10″N 92°43′51″W
- Area: less than one acre
- Built: c. 1859, c. 1870
- Architectural style: Vernacular brick
- MPS: Boonville Missouri MRA
- NRHP reference No.: 82005316
- Added to NRHP: March 16, 1990

Morton–Myer House is a historic home located at Boonville, Cooper County, Missouri. It was built about 1859 and enlarged about 1870, and is a 1 1/2-story, vernacular brick dwelling with a central hall plan. It has a rear ell and rear shed additions and partial basement. Also on the property are the contributing brick smokehouse and stone cellar.

It was listed on the National Register of Historic Places in 1990.
