= Pleasant Green =

Historic house in Missouri, United States

- U.S. National Register of Historic Places
- Location within Missouri Location within the United States
- Location: 8 miles SW of Pilot Grove on U.S. 135, near Pilot Grove, Missouri
- Coordinates: 38°48′11″N 92°59′15″W
- Area: 6.3 acres (2.5 ha)
- Built: c. 1825
- Architectural style: Classic Revival
- NRHP reference No.: 77000804
- Added to NRHP: July 29, 1977

Pleasant Green, also known as the Andrews-Chesnutt House and Winston Walker House, is a historic home located near Pilot Grove, Cooper County, Missouri. It was built about 1825, and is a two-story, five-bay, Classic Revival style brick dwelling with a two-story wood-frame addition. It features a front portico supported by six columns. The house also has a 1 1/2-story brick section and one-story kitchen wing. Also on the property are the contributing smokehouse, a slave structure, and hexagonal wood-frame barn (c. 1900). It was the home of journalist Stanley Andrews (1894-1994).

It was listed on the National Register of Historic Places in 1977.
