= Wilbur T. and Rhoda Stephens Johnson House =

Historic house in Missouri, United States

- U.S. National Register of Historic Places
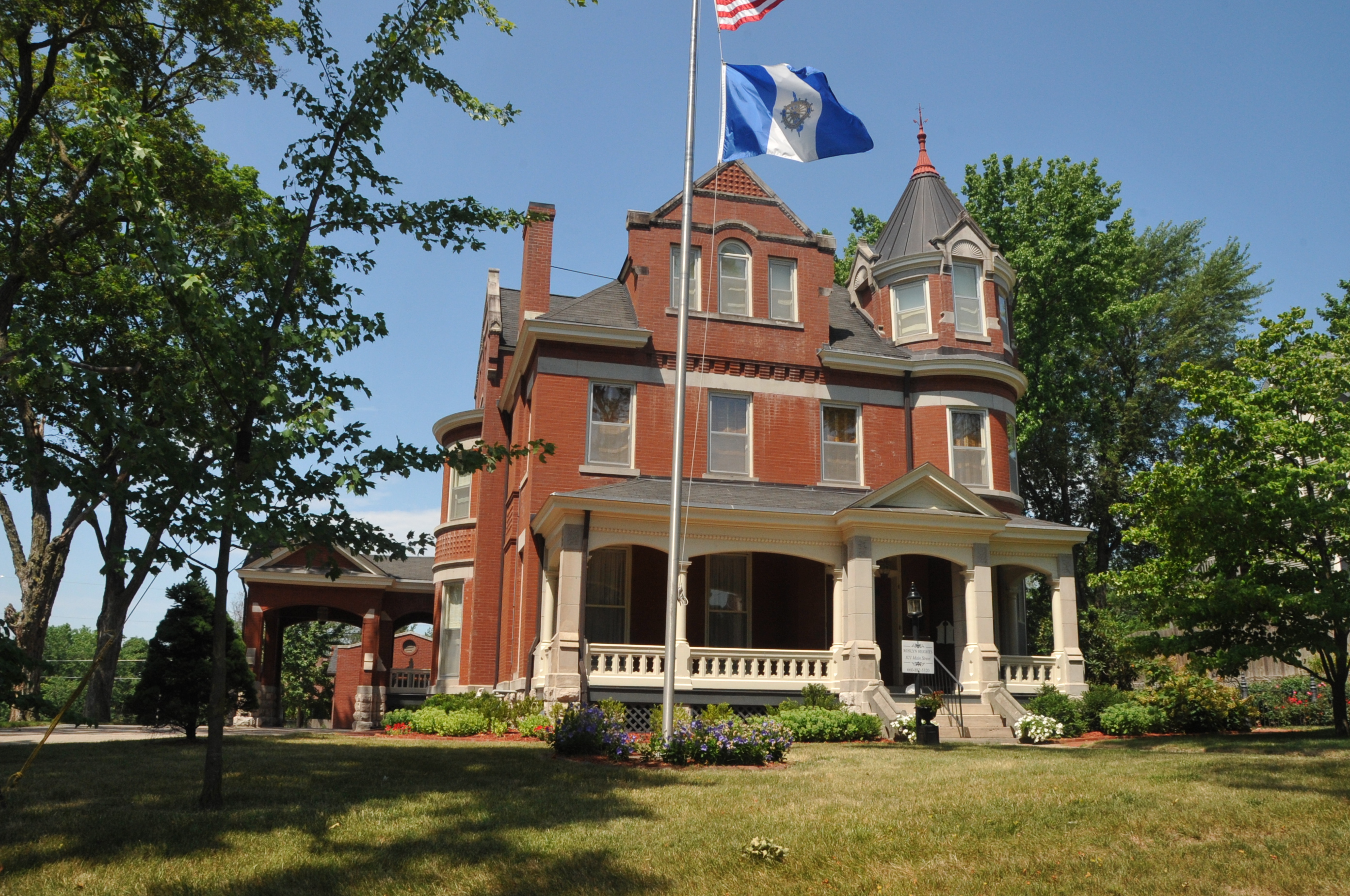
- Wilbur T. and Rhoda Stephens Johnson House, July 2013

- Location within Missouri Location within the United States
- Location: 821 Main, Boonville, Missouri
- Coordinates: 38°58′12″N 92°43′50″W
- Area: less than one acre
- Built: 1895
- Architectural style: Queen Anne, Romanesque
- MPS: Boonville Missouri MRA
- NRHP reference No.: 82005322
- Added to NRHP: March 16, 1990

Wilbur T. and Rhoda Stephens Johnson House, also known as the Missouri State DAR Headquarters and Roslyn Heights, is a historic home located at Boonville, Cooper County, Missouri. It was built in 1895, and is a three-story, Queen Anne style red brick and limestone dwelling with elements of the Richardsonian Romanesque. It has a full basement, a porte cochere, and a full-length front entrance porch. It features projecting porches, turrets and bays, a circular tower, and terra cotta panels. It was purchased by the Missouri State Society of the Daughters of the American Revolution for their state headquarters in 1983.

It was listed on the National Register of Historic Places in 1990.
