= Juliet Trigg Johnson House =

Historic house in Missouri, United States

- U.S. National Register of Historic Places
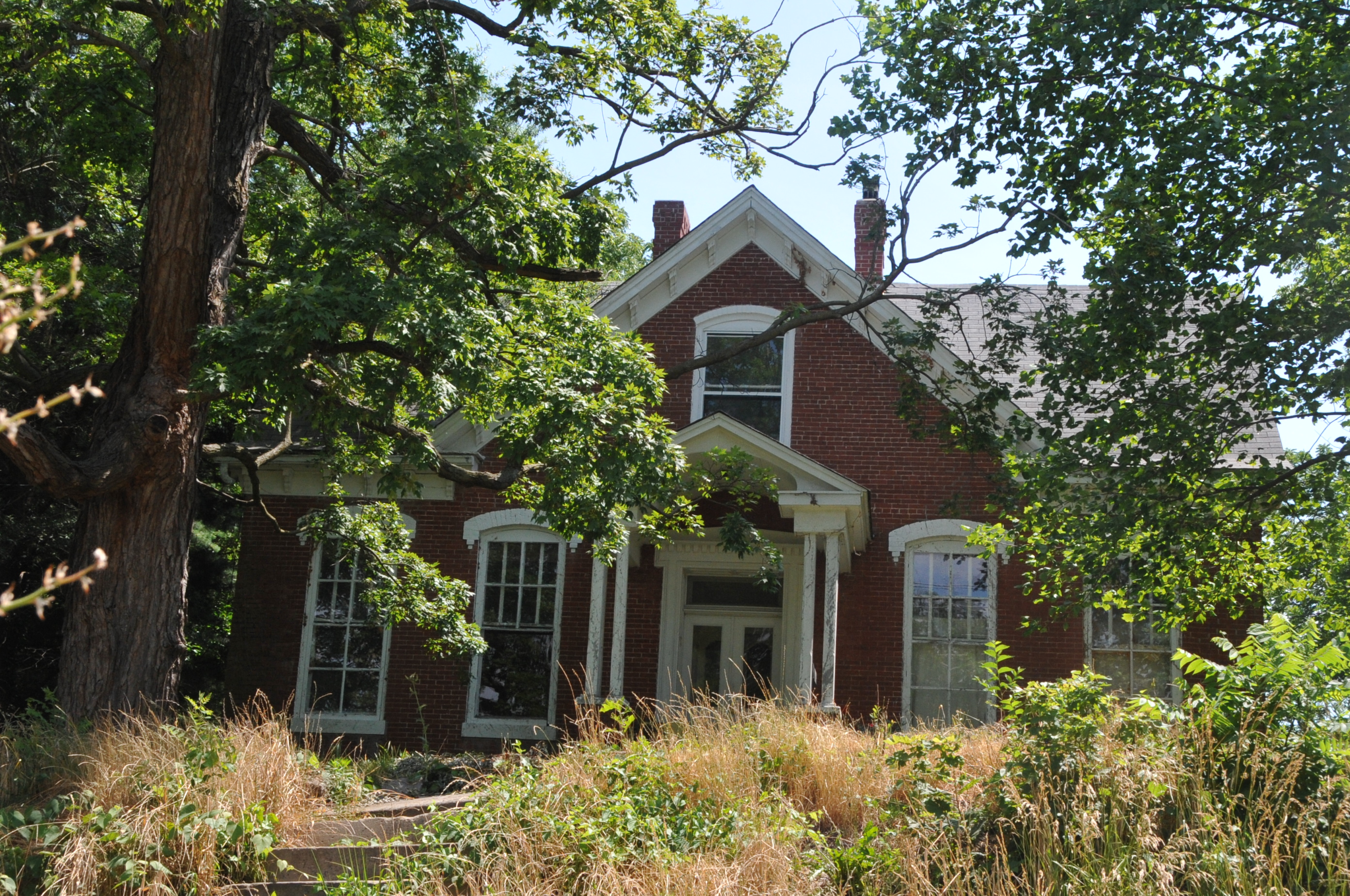
- Juliet Trigg Johnson House, July 2013

- Location within Missouri Location within the United States
- Location: 1304 Main St., Boonville, Missouri
- Coordinates: 38°57′50″N 92°44′24″W
- Area: less than one acre
- Built: 1857
- Architectural style: Gothic Revival
- MPS: Boonville Missouri MRA
- NRHP reference No.: 82005327
- Added to NRHP: March 16, 1990

Juliet Trigg Johnson House is a historic home located at Boonville, Cooper County, Missouri, United States. It was built between 1857 and 1860, and is a 1 1/2-story, "T"-plan, Gothic Revival style brick dwelling. It has flared gable roofs distinguished by returns and a centered cross gable. It was built by Dr. William H. Trigg as a wedding gift for his daughter, as was the Josephine Trigg Pigott House.

It was listed on the National Register of Historic Places in 1990.
