= John S. Dauwalter House =

Historic house in Missouri, United States

- U.S. National Register of Historic Places
- Location within Missouri Location within the United States
- Location: 817 Seventh St., Boonville, Missouri
- Coordinates: 38°58′11″N 92°44′20″W
- Area: less than one acre
- Built: c. 1869, c. 1880, c. 1920
- Architectural style: Vernacular brick
- MPS: Boonville Missouri MRA
- NRHP reference No.: 82005296
- Added to NRHP: March 16, 1990

John S. Dauwalter House is a historic home located at Boonville, Cooper County, Missouri. It was built about 1869, and is a 1 1/2-story, vernacular brick dwelling. A front gable ell was added about 1880, and a rear shed addition and enclosure of a recessed corner porch completed about 1920. Also on the property are the contributing gable roofed cow barn, a shed roofed storage building, and a two-room wash house with a saltbox roof.

It was listed on the National Register of Historic Places in 1990.
