= Mount Nebo Baptist Church =

Historic church in Missouri, United States

- Missouri, Mount Nebo Baptist Church
- U.S. National Register of Historic Places
- Location within Missouri Location within the United States
- Location: RFD #1 Pilot Grove, Missouri
- Coordinates: 38°48′12″N 92°53′22″W
- Area: less than one acre
- Built: 1856
- Architectural style: antebellum, braced frame, southern protestant church, Greek Revival
- NRHP reference No.: 86001111
- Added to NRHP: May 23, 1986

Mount Nebo Baptist Church is a historic Southern Baptist Church located at Pilot Grove, Cooper County, Missouri. It was built in 1856, and is a one-story, antebellum, braced frame, Southern Protestant Church with restrained Greek Revival style detailing. The congregation of the church refurbished and added on in 1856, but the congregation existed since 1820.

Mount Nebo Baptist Church was listed on the National Register of Historic Places in 1990.
