= Boller House =

Historic house in Missouri, United States

- U.S. National Register of Historic Places
- Location within Missouri Location within the United States
- Location: 223 E. Spring St., Boonville, Missouri
- Coordinates: 38°58′30″N 92°44′50″W
- Area: less than one acre
- Built: c. 1835
- Architectural style: Classic Revival
- NRHP reference No.: 77000803
- Added to NRHP: August 2, 1977

Boller House was a historic home located at Boonville, Cooper County, Missouri. It was built about 1835, and was a two-story, five-bay, Classic Revival style brick, timber, and wood-frame dwelling. It consisted of a front block with rear ell and featured a two-story front portico. It has been demolished.

It was listed on the National Register of Historic Places in 1977.
