= Lyric Theater (Boonville, Missouri) =

- U.S. National Register of Historic Places
- U.S. Historic district – Contributing property
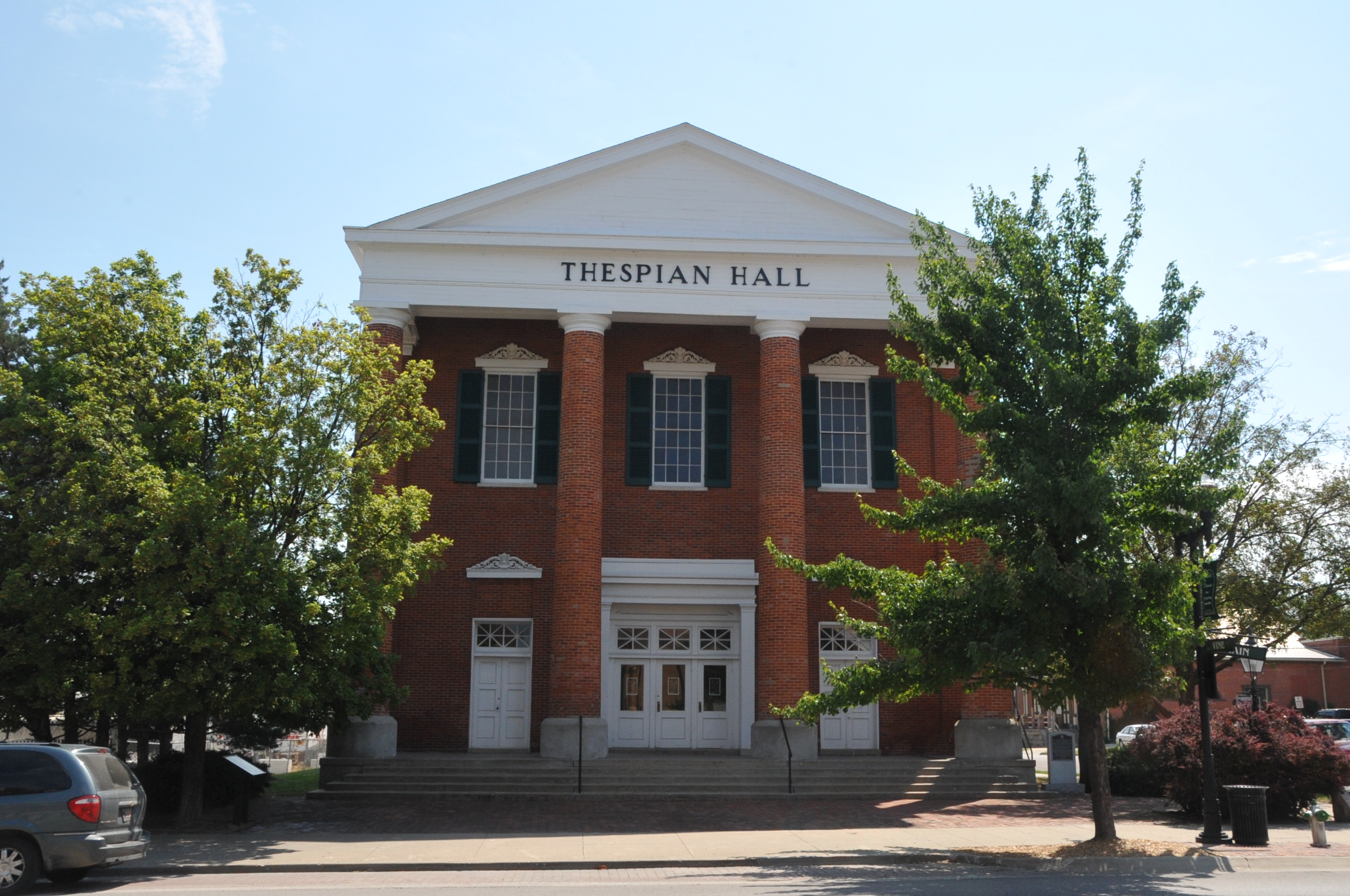
- Lyric Theater, July 2013

- Location within Missouri Location within the United States
- Location: NE corner of Main and Vine Sts., Boonville, Missouri
- Coordinates: 38°58′26″N 92°44′34″W
- Area: less than one acre
- Built: 1855-1857
- Architectural style: Greek Revival
- NRHP reference No.: 69000097
- Added to NRHP: May 21, 1969

Lyric Theater, also known as Thespian Hall, is a historic theatre in Boonville, Cooper County, Missouri, United States. It was built in 1855–1857, and is a two-story, rectangular Greek Revival–style brick building. From 1912 until 1976, it operated as a movie theater. The front facade features a portico with four unfluted Doric columns constructed of wedge-shaped brick. The building was enlarged in 1901. When originally constructed, the basement was used as reading room, the main floor was used as combined theater and lecture hall or auditorium, and the second floor housed the city hall, a Masonic lodge, and an Odd Fellows hall.

It was listed on the National Register of Historic Places in 1969. It is located in Historic District D.
