= Heinrich Boller =

Swiss ice hockey player

Medal record

Men's Ice Hockey
Bronze medal – third place	1948 St. Moritz	Team

Heinrich "Hanggi" Boller (6 September 1921 – 30 June 2007) was a Swiss ice hockey player for the Swiss national team. He won a bronze medal at the 1948 Winter Olympics.
