= Cobblestone Street (Boonville, Missouri) =

- U.S. National Register of Historic Places
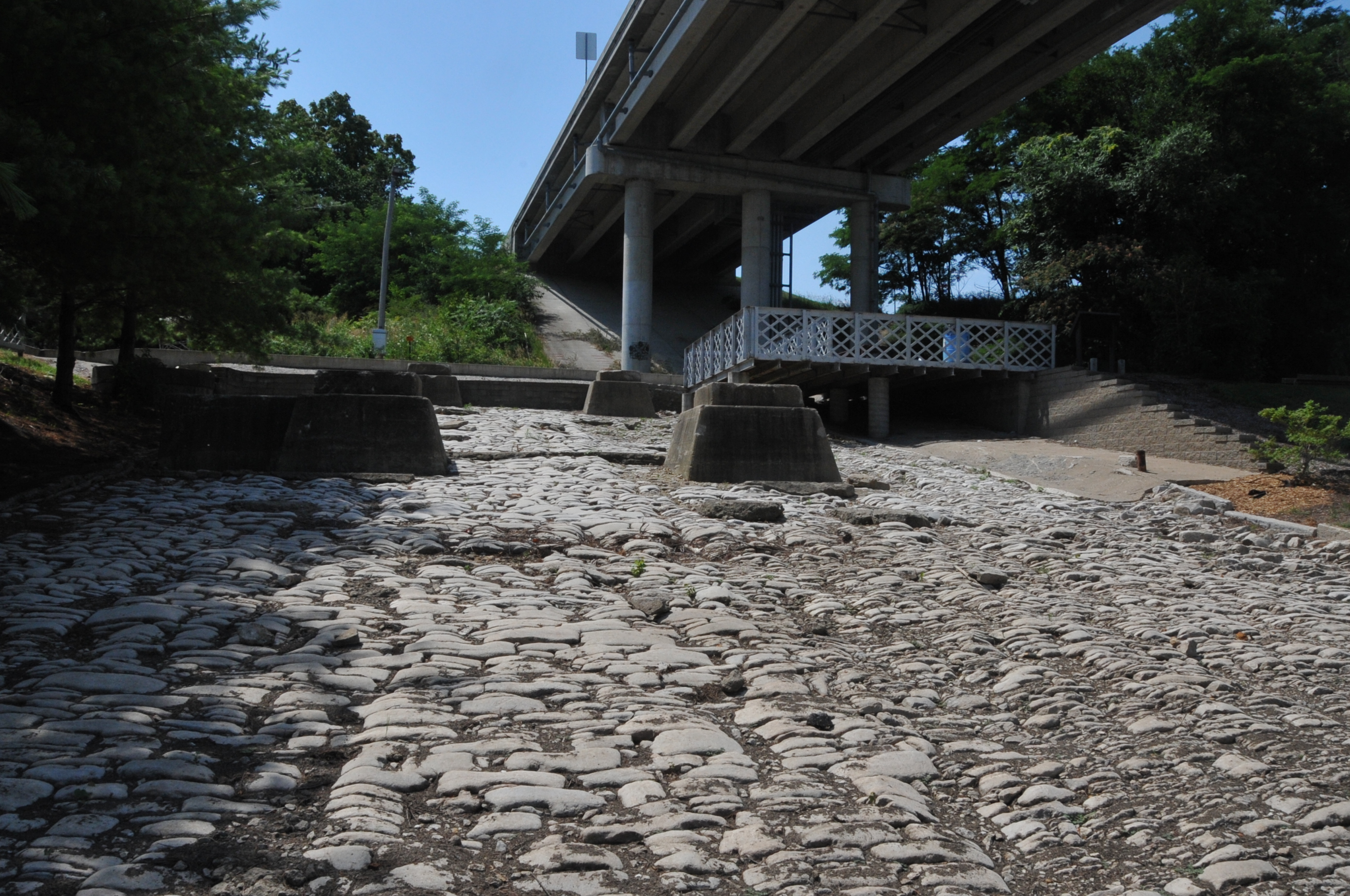
- Cobblestone Street, July 2013

- Location within Missouri Location within the United States
- Location: 100 Main St., Boonville, Missouri
- Coordinates: 38°58′41″N 92°44′40″W
- Area: less than one acre
- Built: c. 1832
- MPS: Boonville Missouri MRA
- NRHP reference No.: 82005293
- Added to NRHP: March 16, 1990

Cobblestone Street, also known as Fifth Street and Main Street, is a historic cobblestone street located at Boonville, Cooper County, Missouri. It was built about 1832, and was part of the original Fifth or Main Street. It is located beneath the Boonville Road Bridge and is constructed of cobblestones of varying sizes. The street remnant is approximately 20 feet wide and approximately 200 feet long. The street connected the main commercial district of Boonville with the wharves along the Missouri River.

It was listed on the National Register of Historic Places in 1990.
