= Pat Boller =

American ice hockey coach and executive

- Born: November 20, 1972 (age 52); New York, NY, USA
- Occupation(s): Asst. general manager Asst. coach
- Employer: Hartford Wolf Pack

Pat Boller (born November 20, 1972) is an American ice hockey coach and executive. He is currently an assistant coach and the assistant general manager with the Hartford Wolf Pack of the American Hockey League (AHL).

Boller joined the Hartford Wolf Pack as an assistant coach in 2007. Before the 2012–13 season, he took on the additional responsibility as assistant general manager under Jim Schoenfeld.
