= Boonville station =

- Missouri, Kansas and Texas Railroad Depot
- U.S. National Register of Historic Places
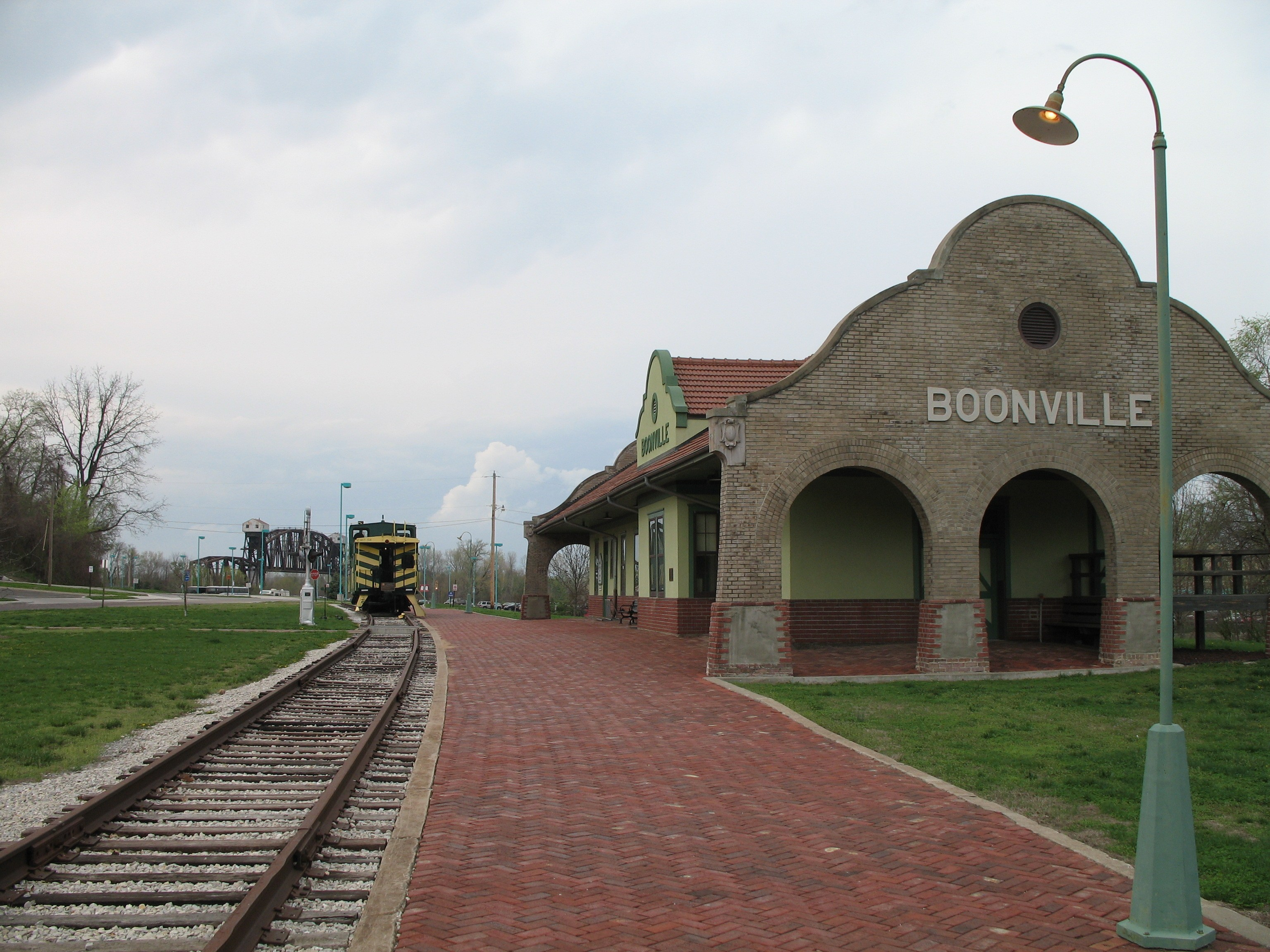

- Location within Missouri Location within the United States
- Location: 320 First St., Boonville, Missouri
- Coordinates: 38°58′30″N 92°44′57″W
- Built: 1912
- Architect: Missouri, Kansas & Texas RR
- Architectural style: Mission Revival-Spanish Colonial Revival
- MPS: Boonville Missouri MRA
- NRHP reference No.: 82005312
- Added to NRHP: March 16, 1990

Boonville station is a historic train station located at Boonville, Cooper County, Missouri. It was built in 1912 by the Missouri–Kansas–Texas Railroad. It is a one-story, nine-bay, Mission Revival-Spanish Colonial Revival style building sheathed in stucco. A projecting bay which houses a telegrapher's station and the patrons' and trainmen's lobby. It features stepped and arched brick parapets at each gable end supported by three arched columns.

The station was listed on the National Register of Historic Places in 1990 as the Missouri, Kansas and Texas Railroad Depot.

Preceding station	Missouri–Kansas–Texas Railroad	Following station
Pilot Grove toward Galveston	Main Line	New Franklin toward St. Louis
