= Ravenswood (Bunceton, Missouri) =

Historic house in Missouri, United States

- U.S. National Register of Historic Places
- U.S. Historic district
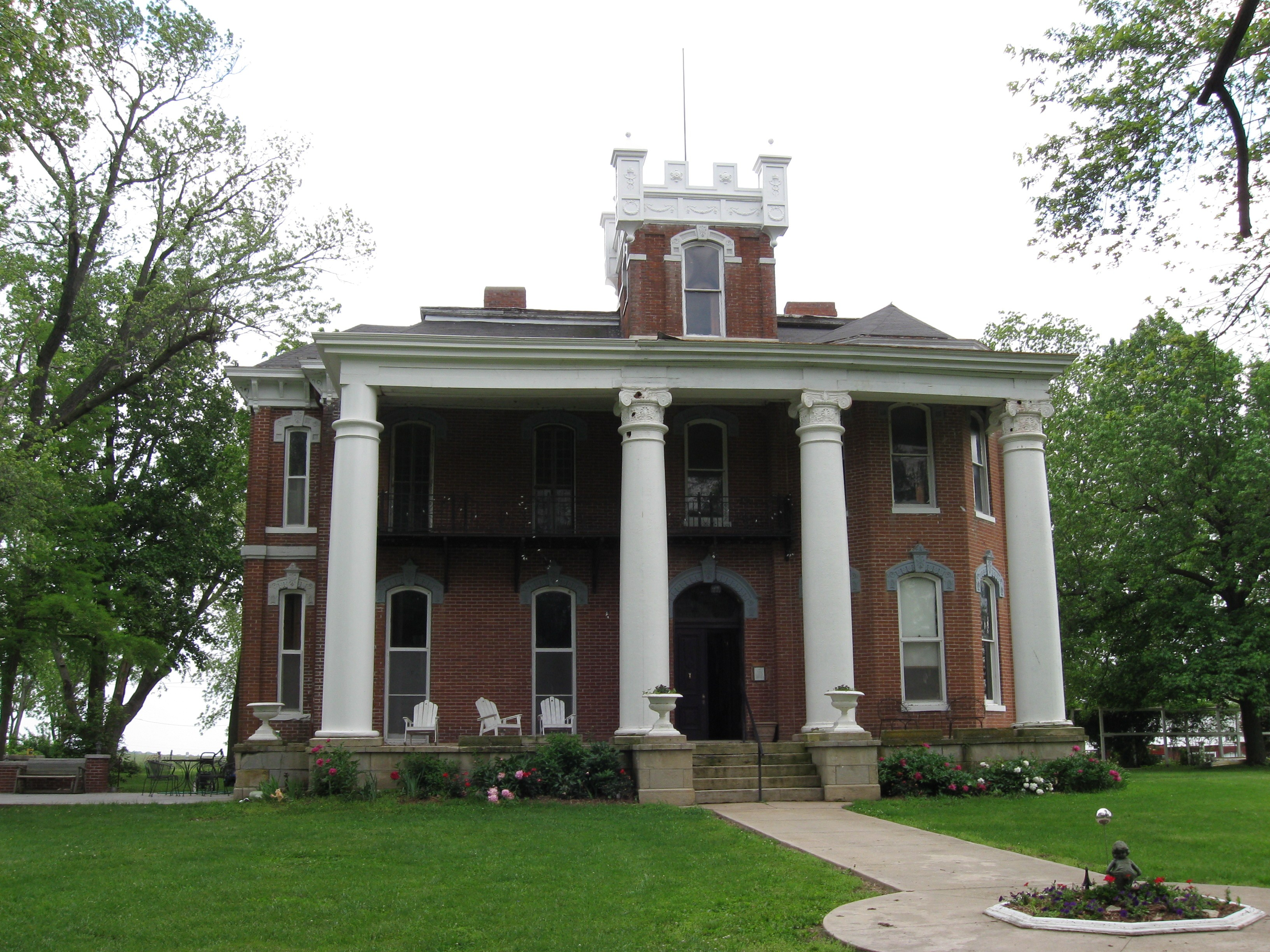

- Location within Missouri Location within the United States
- Nearest city: NW of Bunceton on MO 5, near Bunceton, Missouri
- Coordinates: 38°49′19″N 92°50′17″W
- Area: 1,932 acres (782 ha)
- Built: 1880
- Architectural style: Second Empire, Italianate
- NRHP reference No.: 75001065
- Added to NRHP: February 24, 1975

Ravenswood, also known as the Leonard Home, is a historic home and farm and national historic district located near Bunceton, Cooper County, Missouri. It was built in 1880, and is a 2 1/2-story, eclectic Italianate/Second Empire style brick mansion. It has a low-angle Mansard roof covered with asphalt on top and grey, slate shingles on the slopes. Additions were made to the original house in 1907–1908, 1913 and 1914. Also on the property are the contributing summer kitchen (1869), the Tally-ho barn, the mule barn, a sheep barn, milk barn, carriage house, Manager's House, servants' houses, smokehouse, sheds, a garage, and a pump house.

It was listed on the National Register of Historic Places in 1975.
