= Pilot Grove, Missouri =

- City
- City of Pilot Grove
- Location of Pilot Grove, Missouri
- Coordinates: 38°52′29″N 92°54′44″W
- Country: United States
- State: Missouri
- County: Cooper

Area
  - Total: 0.42 sq mi (1.09 km^{2})
  - Land: 0.42 sq mi (1.09 km^{2})
  - Water: 0 sq mi (0.00 km^{2})
- Elevation: 846 ft (258 m)

Population (2020)
  - Total: 665
  - Density: 1,580.5/sq mi (610.23/km^{2})
- Time zone: UTC-6 (Central (CST))
  - Summer (DST): UTC-5 (CDT)
- ZIP code: 65276
- Area code: 660
- FIPS code: 29-57602
- GNIS feature ID: 2396204
- Website: cityofpilotgrovemo.gov

Pilot Grove is a city in the Pilot Grove Township in northern Cooper County, Missouri, United States. As of the 2020 census, Pilot Grove had a population of 665.

== History ==
Pilot Grove was platted in 1873. The city was named from an old-growth grove of hickory trees, which once served as a local landmark or "pilot" to travelers.

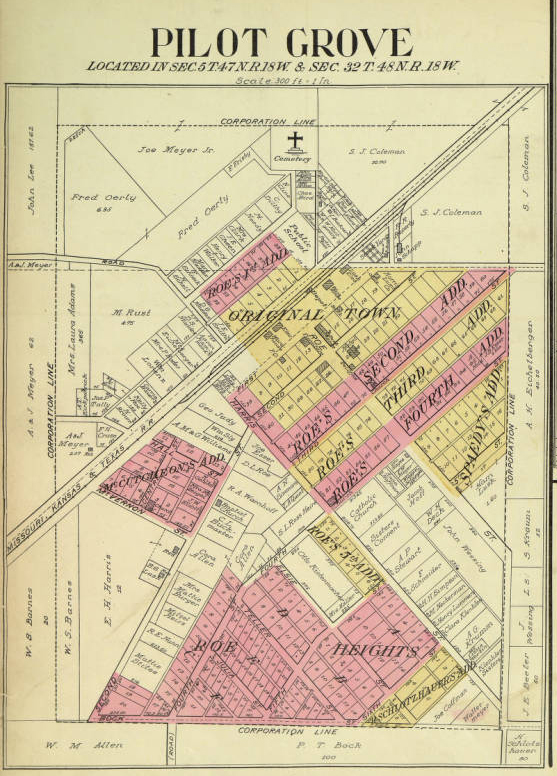
1915 map of Pilot Grove, Cooper County, Missouri from the Standard Atlas of Cooper County, Missouri 1915, p. 12 State Historical Society of Missouri

On April 2, 2025, an EF2 tornado struck the city of Pilot Grove. There were no weather related injuries reported but there was damage to structures. The local tornado sirens didn't activate.

== Geography ==
Pilot Grove is located along Missouri Route 135 and is four miles south of I-70. It is approximately eleven miles southwest of Boonville. The Petite Saline Creek flows past about two miles to the east of the town.

According to the United States Census Bureau, the city has a total area of 0.42 square miles (1.09 km^{2}), all land.

== Demographics ==
Historical population
Census	Pop.	Note	%±
1880	209		—
1890	560		167.9%
1900	631		12.7%
1910	554		−12.2%
1920	753		35.9%
1930	654		−13.1%
1940	748		14.4%
1950	635		−15.1%
1960	680		7.1%
1970	701		3.1%
1980	745		6.3%
1990	714		−4.2%
2000	723		1.3%
2010	768		6.2%
2020	665		−13.4%
U.S. Decennial Census

=== 2010 census ===
As of the census of 2010, there were 768 people, 304 households, and 193 families living in the city. The population density was 1,828.6 inhabitants per square mile (706.0/km^{2}). There were 334 housing units at an average density of 795.2 per square mile (307.0/km^{2}). The racial makeup of the city was 96.5% White, 1.3% African American, 0.4% Native American, 0.4% Asian, and 1.4% from two or more races. Hispanic or Latino of any race were 1.0% of the population.

There were 304 households, of which 30.9% had children under the age of 18 living with them, 47.4% were married couples living together, 12.5% had a female householder with no husband present, 3.6% had a male householder with no wife present, and 36.5% were non-families. 34.2% of all households were made up of individuals, and 20.4% had someone living alone who was 65 years of age or older. The average household size was 2.33 and the average family size was 2.93.

The median age in the city was 43.4 years. 23.4% of residents were under the age of 18; 5.5% were between the ages of 18 and 24; 23.8% were from 25 to 44; 21.9% were from 45 to 64; and 25.3% were 65 years of age or older. The gender makeup of the city was 44.7% male and 55.3% female.

=== 2000 census ===
As of the census of 2000, there were 723 people, 287 households, and 187 families living in the city. The population density was 1,724.8 inhabitants per square mile (665.9/km^{2}). There were 317 housing units at an average density of 756.2 per square mile (292.0/km^{2}). The racial makeup of the city was 97.37% White, 0.97% African American, 0.69% Native American, and 0.97% from two or more races. Hispanic or Latino of any race were 0.55% of the population.

There were 287 households, out of which 27.9% had children under the age of 18 living with them, 50.5% were married couples living together, 11.8% had a female householder with no husband present, and 34.5% were non-families. 31.7% of all households were made up of individuals, and 15.7% had someone living alone who was 65 years of age or older. The average household size was 2.31 and the average family size was 2.89.

In the city the population was spread out, with 21.3% under the age of 18, 9.8% from 18 to 24, 21.7% from 25 to 44, 22.3% from 45 to 64, and 24.9% who were 65 years of age or older. The median age was 42 years. For every 100 females, there were 86.8 males. For every 100 females age 18 and over, there were 85.9 males.

The median income for a household in the city was $31,354, and the median income for a family was $37,143. Males had a median income of $29,318 versus $20,313 for females. The per capita income for the city was $14,857. About 4.8% of families and 7.0% of the population were below the poverty line, including 6.3% of those under age 18 and 9.4% of those age 65 or over.

== Notable person ==
- Edward H. Harte, journalist

== See also ==
Tornado outbreak and floods of April 2–7, 2025
