= Boonville, Missouri =

- City
- City of Boonville
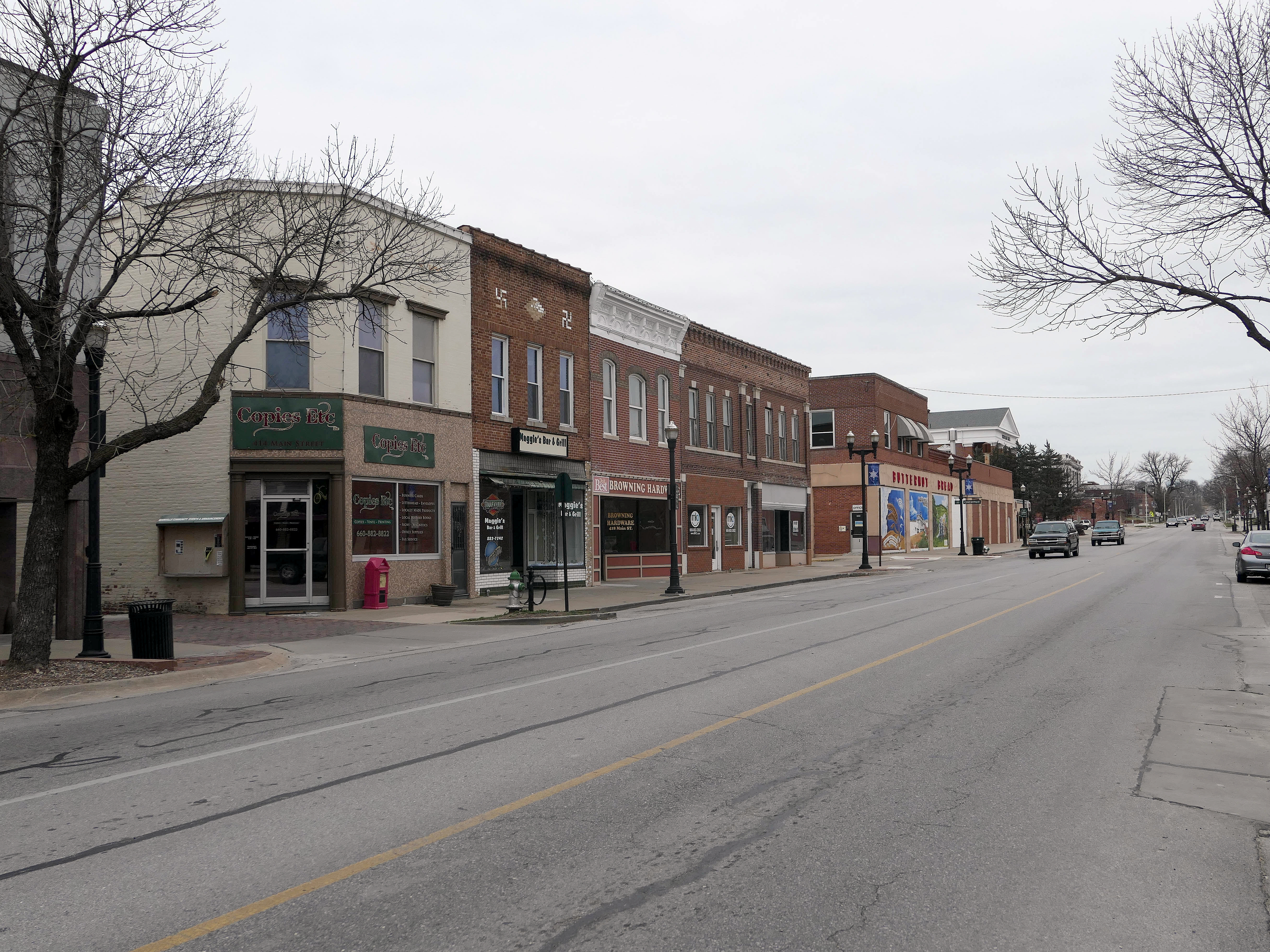
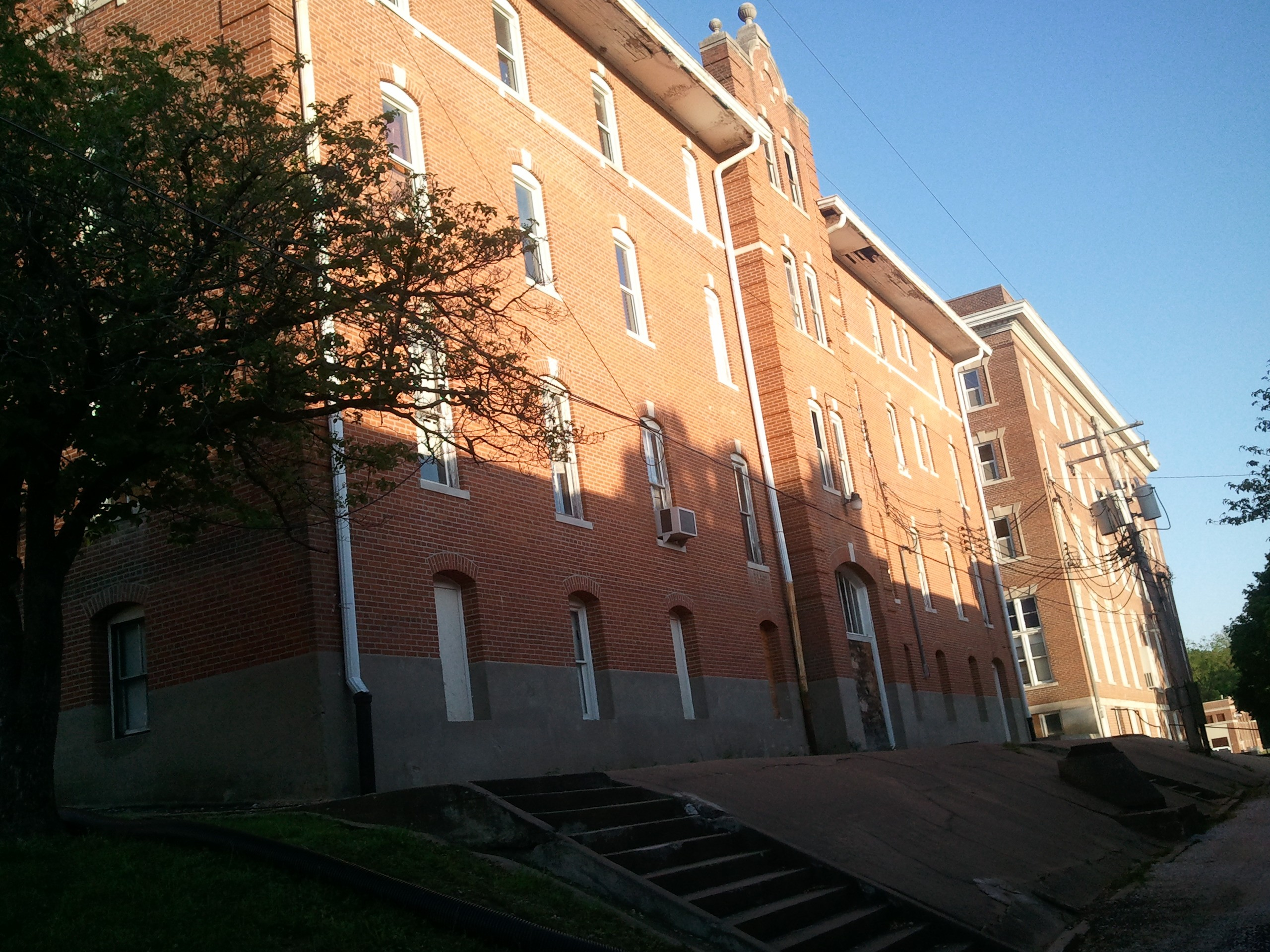
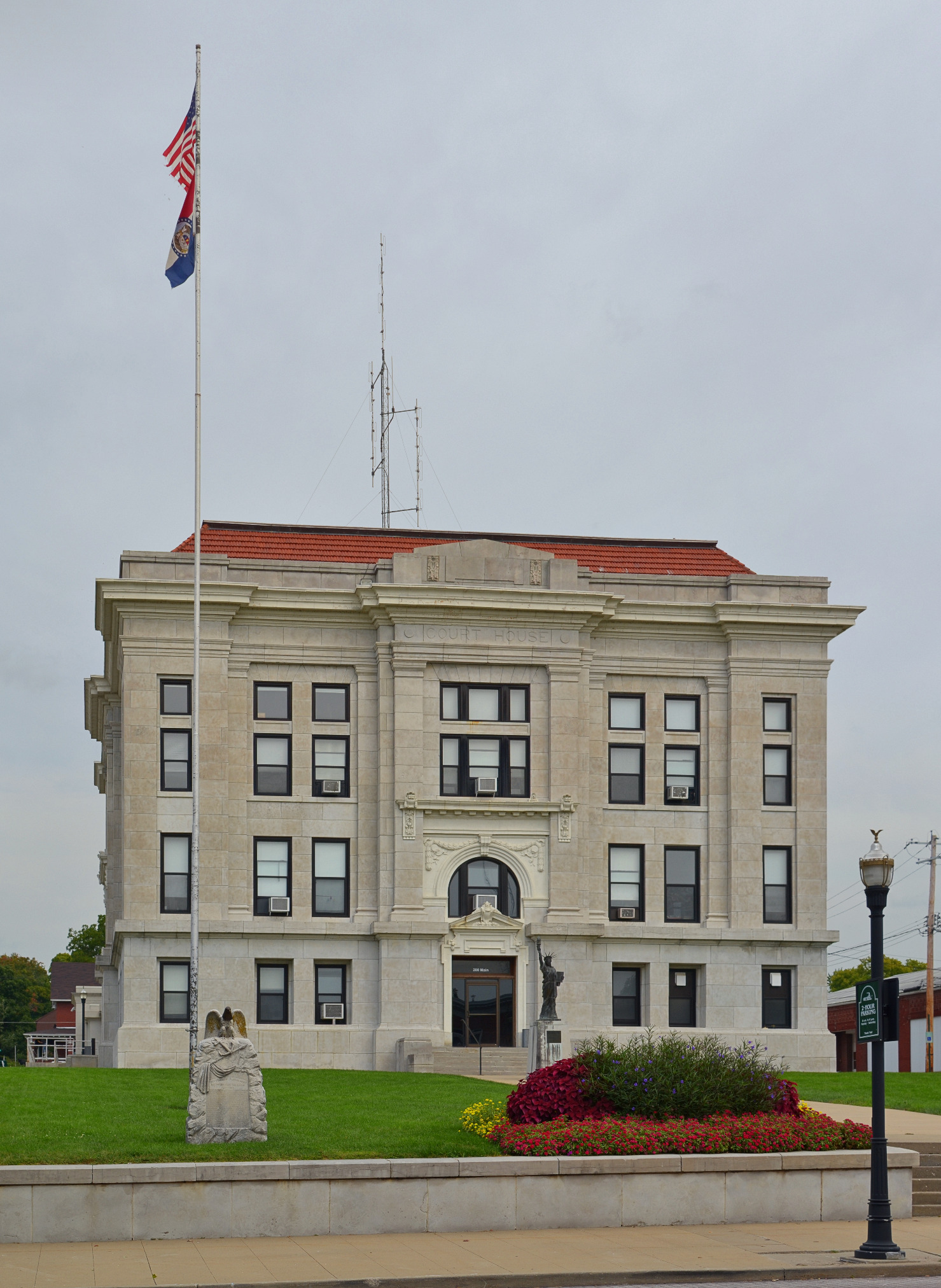
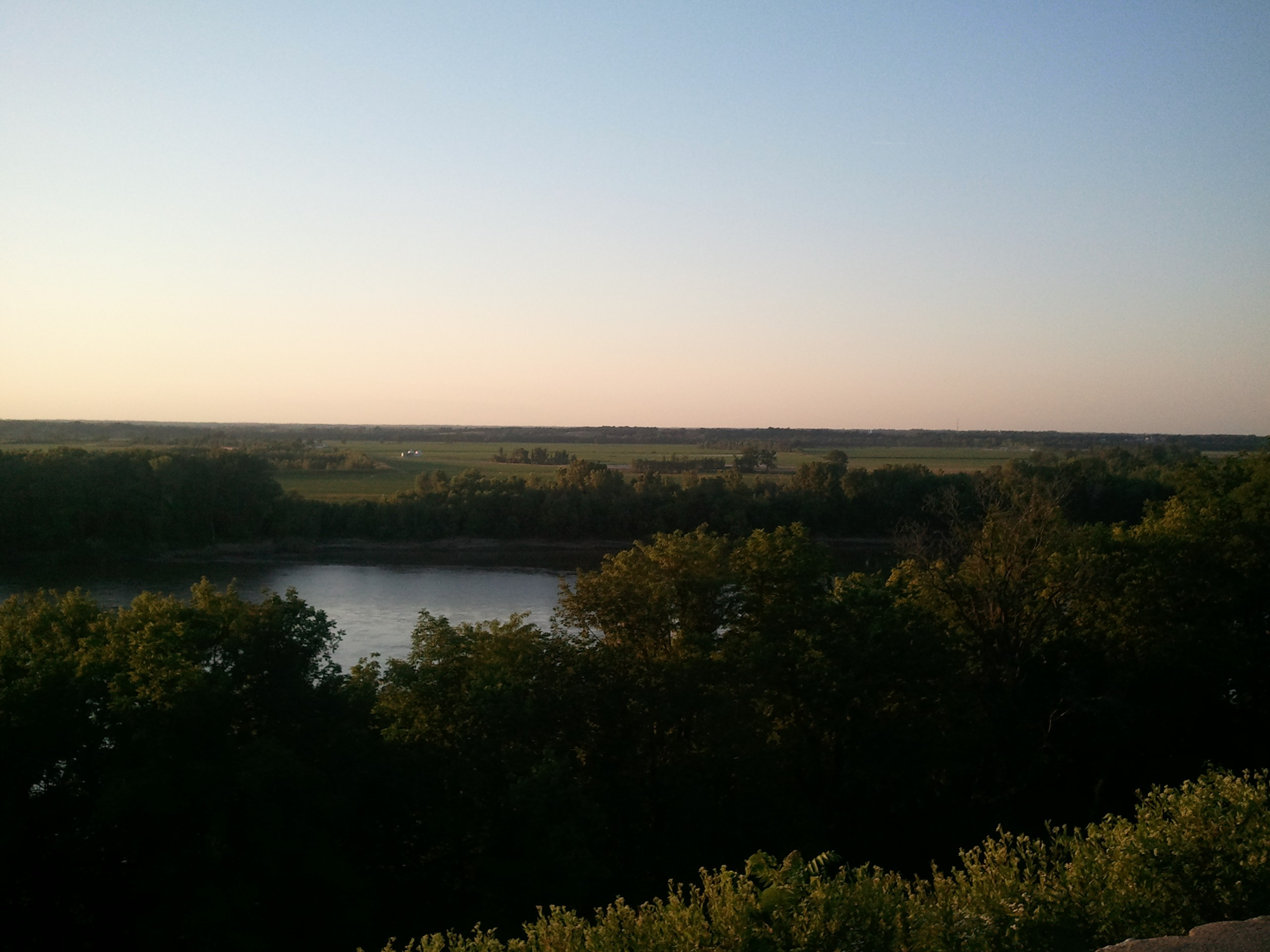
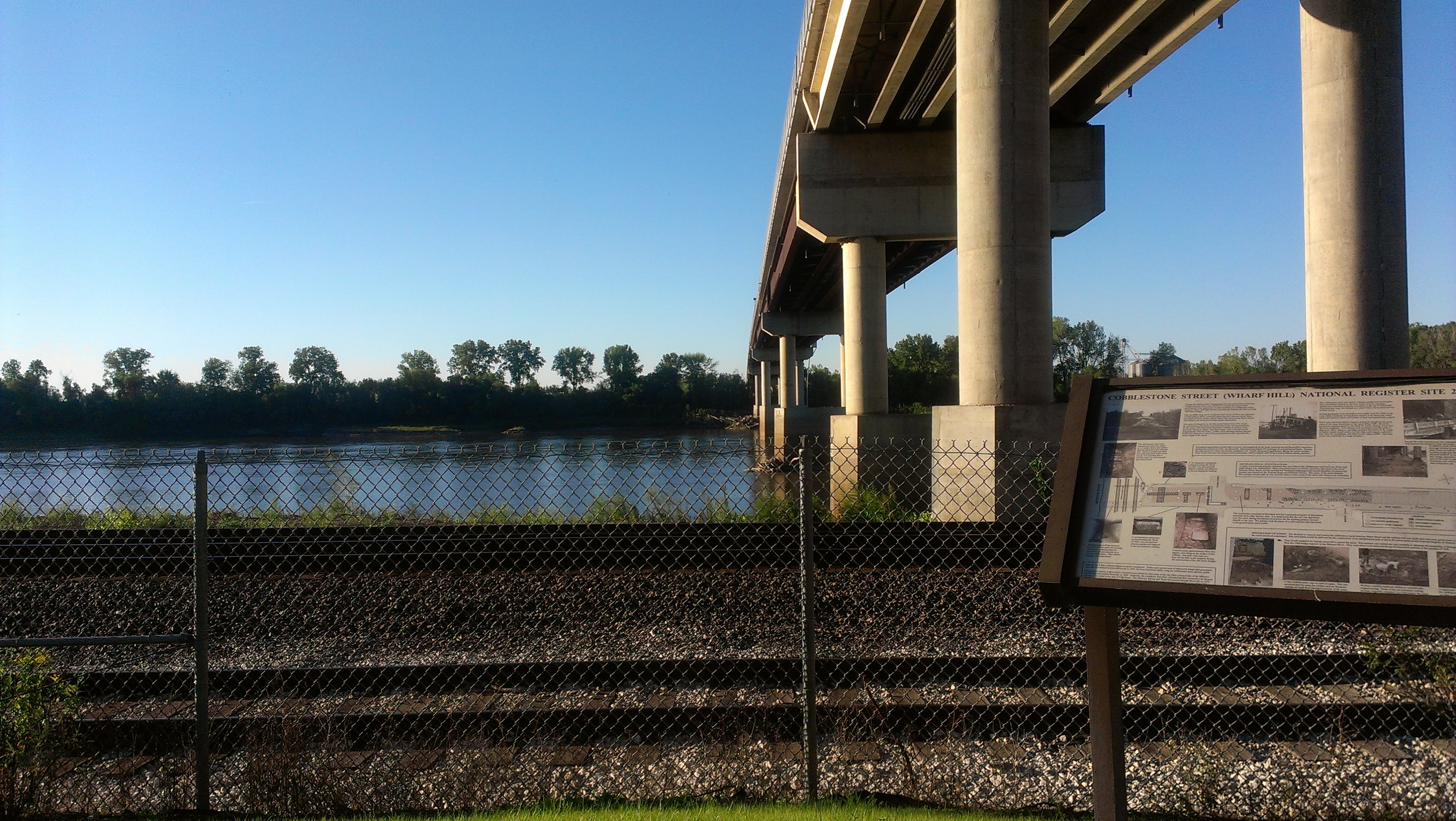
- Clockwise, from top: Downtown Boonville, Kemper Military School, Missouri River from a hilltop, Cobblestone Street, Cooper County, Missouri courthouse, mural of an American Civil War battle
- Interactive map of Boonville, Missouri
- Location within Missouri Location within the United States
- Coordinates: 38°57′30″N 92°44′49″W
- Country: United States
- State: Missouri
- County: Cooper
- Founded: 1817

Government
  - Mayor: Mike Conway

Area
  - Total: 8.06 sq mi (20.88 km^{2})
  - Land: 7.71 sq mi (19.98 km^{2})
  - Water: 0.34 sq mi (0.89 km^{2})
- Elevation: 679 ft (207 m)

Population (2020)
  - Total: 7,964
  - Estimate (2023): 7,894
  - Density: 1,032.1/sq mi (398.51/km^{2})
- Time zone: UTC−6 (Central (CST))
  - Summer (DST): UTC−5 (CDT)
- ZIP code: 65233
- Area code: 660
- FIPS code: 29-07318
- GNIS feature ID: 2394222
- Website: http://boonvillemo.org/

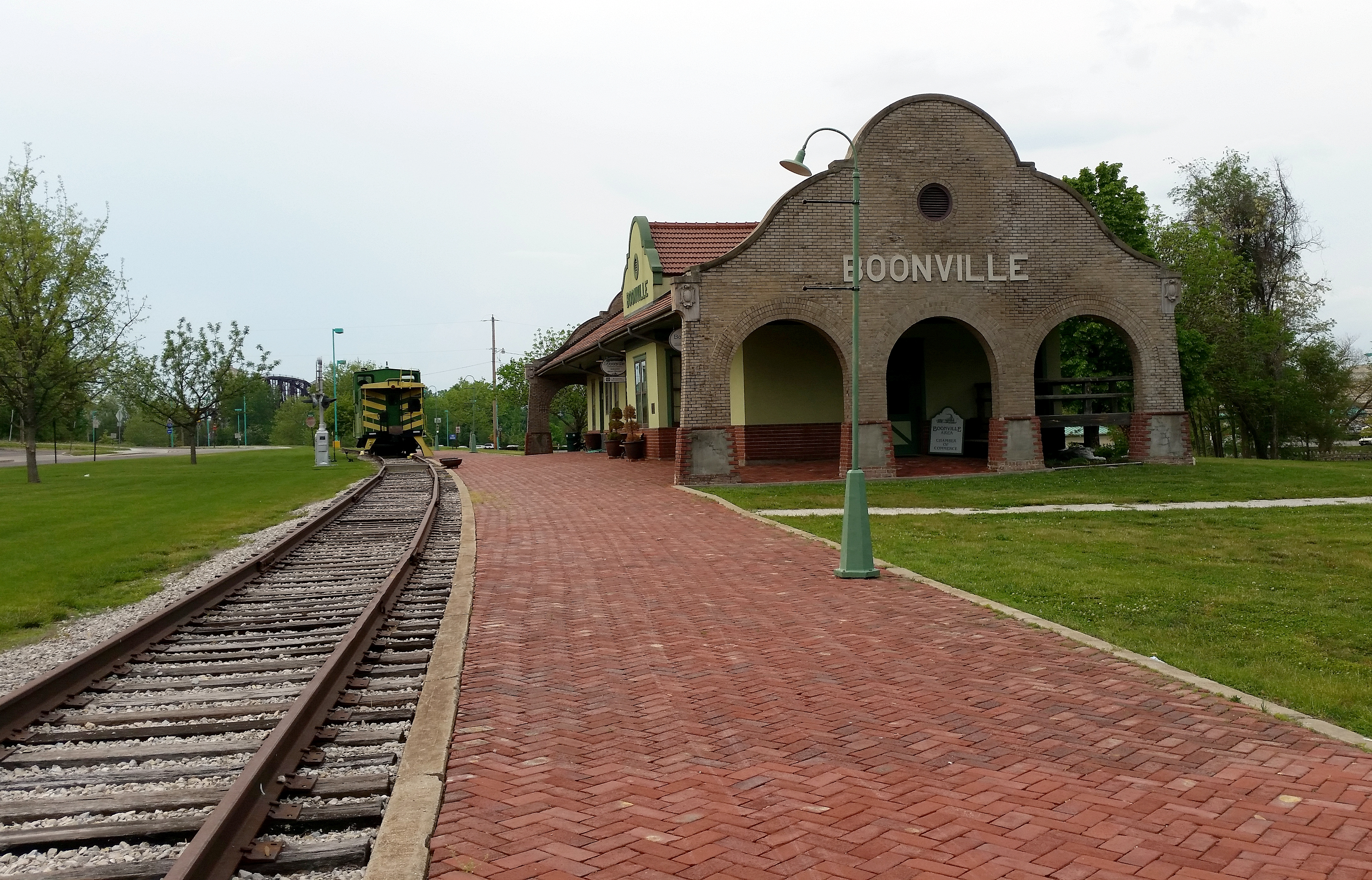
Former train station in Boonville

Boonville is a city and the county seat of Cooper County, Missouri, United States. The population was 7,964 at the 2020 census. The city was the site of a skirmish early in the Civil War, on July 17, 1861. Union forces defeated the Missouri State Guard in the first Battle of Boonville. It is part of the Columbia, Missouri metropolitan area.

== History ==
The community derives its name from Nathan and Daniel Morgan Boone, who were the sons of Daniel Boone and established their salt business near the community in the early 1800s, delivering their product from salt licks to St. Louis. The area has been called "Boone's Lick" and the route from the lick to St. Charles/St. Louis, Missouri is called the Boone's Lick Trail. The eastern terminus near Boonville at Franklin, Missouri is considered the original start of the Santa Fe Trail.

The first pioneers were Hannah and Stephen Cole, who settled in 1810. During skirmishes with Native Americans in the War of 1812 they moved to a fort on the north side of the Missouri River (called on markers as "Hannah Cole Fort"). That fort subsequently became the first county seat of Howard County, Missouri.

After the war, the town was formally laid out in 1817 by Asa Morgan and Charles Lucas. Boonville was named the county seat in 1818.

The community's position on the Santa Fe Trail and Missouri River led to many historically important residents during the era of westward expansion, including politicians William Ash (a former slave turned Virginia General Assemblyman), David Barton, George Graham Vest (famous for his "man’s best friend" closing argument in an 1869 trial), and self-taught artist George Caleb Bingham.

The Cooper County Jail was built in 1848 and remained in place until 1979 with a claim that it was the longest-serving jail in Missouri history.

In 1855, Thespian Hall opened, and today claims to be the oldest continuously running theatre west of the Allegheny Mountains.

More than 400 buildings (most in 14 separate historical districts) are listed on National Register of Historic Places listings in Cooper County, Missouri.

During the American Civil War, the community was fought over and held by both Union and Confederate forces, beginning with the Battle of Boonville on June 17, 1861 (a month before the First Battle of Bull Run) which gave the Union control of the Missouri River. The Second Battle of Boonville occurred on September 13, 1861. The community would be captured by Sterling Price in 1864 in Price's Raid.

The city was a strategic target because of its location on the Missouri Pacific Railroad. The track was subsequently taken over by the Missouri–Kansas–Texas Railroad. In the 1980s, the track section that traversed the town was converted into parkland, as part of Katy Trail State Park. Today, the "Katy Trail" is the longest rails to trails system in the United States.

In 2008, Anheuser-Busch InBev opened the Warm Springs Ranch east of Boonville as the primary breeding farm for the Budweiser Clydesdales.

== Geography ==
According to the United States Census Bureau, the city has a total area of 7.21 square miles (18.67 km^{2}), of which 6.89 square miles (17.85 km^{2}) is land and 0.32 square miles (0.83 km^{2}) is water.

=== Climate ===
Climate data for Boonville, Missouri (1991–2020)
Month	Jan	Feb	Mar	Apr	May	Jun	Jul	Aug	Sep	Oct	Nov	Dec	Year
Mean daily maximum °F (°C)	38.2 (3.4)	44.2 (6.8)	55.2 (12.9)	66.6 (19.2)	75.9 (24.4)	84.8 (29.3)	88.9 (31.6)	87.8 (31.0)	80.2 (26.8)	68.7 (20.4)	54.5 (12.5)	42.4 (5.8)	65.6 (18.7)
Daily mean °F (°C)	29.6 (−1.3)	34.7 (1.5)	44.8 (7.1)	55.6 (13.1)	65.8 (18.8)	75.2 (24.0)	79.3 (26.3)	77.5 (25.3)	69.2 (20.7)	57.3 (14.1)	44.9 (7.2)	34.2 (1.2)	55.7 (13.2)
Mean daily minimum °F (°C)	21.0 (−6.1)	25.1 (−3.8)	34.4 (1.3)	44.7 (7.1)	55.7 (13.2)	65.6 (18.7)	69.6 (20.9)	67.1 (19.5)	58.2 (14.6)	45.9 (7.7)	35.2 (1.8)	25.9 (−3.4)	45.7 (7.6)
Average precipitation inches (mm)	1.84 (47)	2.07 (53)	3.22 (82)	4.33 (110)	5.04 (128)	4.53 (115)	4.38 (111)	4.16 (106)	3.90 (99)	3.11 (79)	2.80 (71)	1.63 (41)	41.01 (1,042)
Average snowfall inches (cm)	6.2 (16)	2.7 (6.9)	1.1 (2.8)	0.0 (0.0)	0.0 (0.0)	0.0 (0.0)	0.0 (0.0)	0.0 (0.0)	0.0 (0.0)	0.0 (0.0)	0.5 (1.3)	2.8 (7.1)	13.3 (34.1)
Source: NOAA

== Demographics ==
Historical population
Census	Pop.	Note	%±
1850	2,326		—
1860	2,596		11.6%
1870	3,506		35.1%
1880	3,854		9.9%
1890	4,141		7.4%
1900	4,377		5.7%
1910	4,252		−2.9%
1920	4,665		9.7%
1930	6,435		37.9%
1940	6,089		−5.4%
1950	6,686		9.8%
1960	7,090		6.0%
1970	7,514		6.0%
1980	6,959		−7.4%
1990	7,095		2.0%
2000	8,202		15.6%
2010	8,319		1.4%
2020	7,964		−4.3%
U.S. Decennial Census

=== 2020 census ===
As of the 2020 census, Boonville had a population of 7,964 people, 3,015 households, and 1,938 families. The population density was 1,031.6 per square mile (398.6/km^{2}).

The median age was 38.8 years. 20.9% of residents were under the age of 18 and 17.6% were 65 years of age or older. For every 100 females there were 112.5 males, and for every 100 females age 18 and over there were 114.8 males age 18 and over.

99.0% of residents lived in urban areas, while 1.0% lived in rural areas.

Of the 3,015 households, 29.2% had children under the age of 18 living in them. Of all households, 37.1% were married-couple households, 19.2% were households with a male householder and no spouse or partner present, and 34.0% were households with a female householder and no spouse or partner present. About 35.5% of all households were made up of individuals and 15.6% had someone living alone who was 65 years of age or older. The average household size was 2.4 and the average family size was 2.8.

There were 3,322 housing units, of which 9.2% were vacant. The homeowner vacancy rate was 2.0% and the rental vacancy rate was 7.5%.

Racial composition as of the 2020 census
Race	Number	Percent
White	6,351	79.7%
Black or African American	843	10.6%
American Indian and Alaska Native	29	0.4%
Asian	46	0.6%
Native Hawaiian and Other Pacific Islander	2	0.0%
Some other race	70	0.9%
Two or more races	623	7.8%
Hispanic or Latino (of any race)	206	2.6%

=== Income and poverty ===
The 2016–2020 5-year American Community Survey estimates show that the median household income was $43,460 (with a margin of error of +/- $6,578) and the median family income was $53,367 (+/- $7,247). Males had a median income of $28,027 (+/- $4,135) versus $31,048 (+/- $5,148) for females. The median income for those above 16 years old was $29,348 (+/- $3,945). Approximately, 13.3% of families and 14.5% of the population were below the poverty line, including 22.9% of those under the age of 18 and 7.3% of those ages 65 or over.

=== 2010 census ===
As of the census of 2010, there were 8,319 people, 2,918 households, and 1,787 families living in the city. The population density was 1,207.4 inhabitants per square mile (466.2/km^{2}). There were 3,294 housing units at an average density of 478.1 per square mile (184.6/km^{2}). The racial makeup of the city was 83.1% White, 13.3% African American, 0.4% Native American, 0.6% Asian, 0.3% from other races, and 2.2% from two or more races. Hispanic or Latino of any race were 1.9% of the population.

There were 2,918 households, of which 30.8% had children under the age of 18 living with them, 42.9% were married couples living together, 13.2% had a female householder with no husband present, 5.1% had a male householder with no wife present, and 38.8% were non-families. 32.4% of all households were made up of individuals, and 13.7% had someone living alone who was 65 years of age or older. The average household size was 2.35 and the average family size was 2.94.

The median age in the city was 34.6 years. 20.3% of residents were under the age of 18; 12.9% were between the ages of 18 and 24; 28.9% were from 25 to 44; 23.4% were from 45 to 64; and 14.6% were 65 years of age or older. The gender makeup of the city was 55.2% male and 44.8% female.

=== 2000 census ===
As of the census of 2000, there were 8,202 people, 2,667 households, and 1,696 families living in the city. The population density was 1,190.8 inhabitants per square mile (459.8/km^{2}). There were 3,041 housing units at an average density of 441.5 per square mile (170.5/km^{2}). The racial makeup of the city was 80.22% White, 16.84% African American, 0.51% Native American, 0.41% Asian, 0.04% Pacific Islander, 0.40% from other races, and 1.57% from two or more races. Hispanic or Latino of any race were 1.23% of the population.

There were 2,667 households, out of which 30.2% had children under the age of 18 living with them, 48.5% were married couples living together, 11.8% had a female house holder with no husband present, and 36.4% were non-families. 31.2% of all households were made up of individuals, and 15.9% had someone living alone who was 65 years of age or older. The average household size was 2.33 and the average family size was 2.93.

In the city, the age distribution of the population shows 19.6% under the age of 18, 20.8% from 18 to 24, 27.4% from 25 to 44, 16.7% from 45 to 64, and 15.4% who were 65 years of age or older. The median age was 30 years. For every 100 females, there were 138.8 males. For every 100 females age 18 and over, there were 146.0 males.

The median income for a household in the city was $33,440, and the median income for a family was $40,294. Males had a median income of $28,498 versus $20,739 for females. The per capita income for the city was $14,854. About 9.5% of families and 11.3% of the population were below the poverty line, including 13.4% of those under age 18 and 6.7% of those age 65 or over.

== Recreation ==
Boonville is near the middle of the Katy Trail, a 225-mile state park enjoyed by cyclists and hikers. Missouri-Kansas-Texas Bridge in Boonville, which crosses the Missouri near the Isle of Capri Casino and Historic Selwyn Shoe Factory (which has been refurnished as apartments), has been subject of controversy. The Union Pacific Railroad had planned to remove sections of the bridge and reinstall them at Jefferson City, which would sever the route and possibly eliminate the railbank protections and allow the right of way to revert to adjacent property owners. However, Friends of Historic Boonville and others across the state oppose the idea. Governor Jay Nixon announced in 2010 that Union Pacific would transfer ownership of the bridge to the City of Boonville.

Annually, Boonville celebrates Boonville Heritage Days. This is a summer weekend event that focuses on heritage. Activities include a parade, craft booths, a carnival and much fun for people of all ages. On the last evening there is a fireworks show.

Other annual events include the Festival of the Leaves, which is held on the last Saturday in September, and The Festival of The Lights, which is held every Thursday night in September. Shops stay open late, and there are booths with food, free stuff, and games. The historic Thespian Hall, located downtown, is used for concerts, art shows, and plays.

The annual Halloween parade features the award-winning Boonville Silver Pirate Band dressed up in a variety of imaginative maritime costumes.

Twillman Field in Harley Park is also a source of local pride, as it hosts several baseball tournaments every year, including state and regional championships, with ages ranging from 13 to 18. At one time in the late 1980s through 1990s, it was considered by some to be the third best baseball field in the state, trailing only the Major League parks in St. Louis and Kansas City.

== Correctional facility ==
The Missouri Training School for Boys, a juvenile correctional facility of the Missouri Division of Youth Services, opened in 1889. By 1948 violent prisoners had killed two boys. As a result, Governor Phil M. Donnelly removed 71 prisoners from the training school and relocated them to an adult prison. He dismissed the board of the State Board for Training Schools, the juvenile correctional authority. It closed in 1983. The facility is now the Boonville Correctional Center, a minimum security, adult institution for men in the Missouri Department of Corrections.

== Education ==
The Boonville R-1 School District has four schools. Hannah Cole Elementary, David Barton Elementary, Laura Speed Elliott (LSE) Middle School, and Boonville High School are all located in Boonville. The superintendent of schools is Mark Harvey and the school mascot is the Pirates.

There is also a parochial PreK-8th school Sts. Peter and Paul, which was established in the 1850s and has the Warriors as their mascot.

Boonville has a public library, a branch of the Boonslick Regional Library.

== Media ==
Boonville is served by one newspaper, the Boonville Daily News. Boonville also has a radio station, KWRT, which airs at 1370 kHz A.M. and 98.7 kHz F.M.

== Notable people ==
- George Ainslie, Congressional delegate from Idaho Territory.
- Nathaniel Albertson, U.S. Congressman from Indiana
- Cathy Barton, folk music singer and musician
- Henry S. Benedict, U.S. Congressman from California
- Bill Corum, New York sportswriter and sportscaster and Churchill Downs racetrack president, attended school in Boonville
- John Cosgrove, U.S. Congressman from Missouri
- Don Dee, basketball player
- Sara Evans, country music singer and songwriter
- Colonel Arthur M. Hitch, Superintendent of Kemper Military School, 1928–1948
- Colonel Thomas A. Johnston, Builder of Kemper Military School, Superintendent and President from 1881 to 1928
- Frederick T. Kemper, founder of school later known as Kemper Military School
- Carl Lachmund, classical pianist
- Julia Lee, blues singer and pianist
- Julius and William Manger, founders of Manger Hotels
- Bob and Bill Meistrell, inventors of the Body Glove
- John Gaines Miller, U.S. Congressman from Missouri
- Henry L. Myers, U.S. Senator from Montana
- Theron Moses Rice, U.S. Congressman from Missouri
- Joseph Franklin Rutherford (Founder of Jehovah's Witnesses and 2nd President of the Watch Tower Bible & Tract Society) Other references list his birthplace as Versailles, Missouri
- Doc Quigg, journalist
- Lon Vest Stephens, Governor of Missouri and State Treasurer
- Minus Story (band)
- James Milton Turner, educator and diplomat who helped establish Sumner School
- George Graham Vest, U.S. Senator from Missouri
- C.T. Vivian, American writer and civil rights activist
- Florence Warfield Sillers, historian and socialite
- Walter Williams, founder of the Missouri School of Journalism and former president of the University of Missouri
- Robert Patterson Clark Wilson, U.S. Congressman from Missouri
