= Lake (disambiguation) =

A lake is an enclosed geographical body of fresh water.

Lake may also refer to:

- Lake pigment, a pigment manufactured by precipitating a dye with an inert binder, or "mordant", usually a metallic salt

== People ==
- Lake (surname), includes a list of notable people with the surname
- Handsome Lake (1735–1815), Iroquois religious leader
- Lake Bell (born 1979), American actress
- Lake McRee (born 2002), American football player
- Lake Roberson (1918–1984), American football player
- Lake Sagaris (born 1956), Canadian writer, urban planner, translator, and community leader
- Lake Speed (born 1948), American NASCAR driver
- Lake (Infinity Train), a fictional character in the television series Infinity Train

== Places ==
Greenland

- Lake Fjord

United Kingdom

- Lake, Isle of Wight
- Lake, Wiltshire

United States

- Lake, Idaho
- Lake, Kentucky
- Lake, Michigan (disambiguation), several places
- Lake, Mississippi
- Lake Township, Buchanan County, Missouri
- Lake Township, Vernon County, Missouri
- Lake, Oklahoma
- Lake, Virginia
- Lake, West Virginia
- Lake, Wisconsin (disambiguation), several places

== Entertainment and media ==
- Lake (German band), a music group from Germany in the 1970s and 1980s
  - Lake (album), an album by the band
- Lake (American band), lo-fi pop band from Olympia, Washington state
- Lake (video game), a 2021 narrative-adventure video game by Gamious
- WLKO, a radio station licensed to Hickory, North Carolina, United States which calls itself "102.9 the Lake"
- WMYI, a radio station licensed to Hendersonville, North Carolina, United States which calls itself "102.5 the Lake"
- Lake (painting), a painting by Isaac Levitan

== Other uses ==
- Lake Aircraft
- Data lake

== See also ==
- Lakes (disambiguation)
- The Lake (disambiguation)
- The Lakes (disambiguation)
- Lake City (disambiguation)
- Lake County (disambiguation)
- Lake Creek (disambiguation)
- Lake District (disambiguation)
- Lake Forest (disambiguation)
- Lake Park (disambiguation)
- Lake Town (disambiguation)
- Lake Township (disambiguation)
- Justice Lake (disambiguation)
