= The Lake =

The Lake may refer to:

== Film and TV ==
- The Lake, a 2009 Warner Bros. web series starring Elisa Donovan
- The Lake (1998 film), a 1998 television film
- The Lake (2017 film), the working name of a French-American-German film renamed Renegades
- The Lake (2025 film), a Swiss film by Fabrice Aragno
- The Lake (2026 film), an American documentary film by Abby Ellis
- The Lake (TV series), a 2022 Canadian television series for Amazon Prime Video

== Literature and drama ==
- The Lake (play), a British play by Dorothy Massingham and Murray MacDonald
- The Lake (Kawabata novel), a 1954 novel by the Japanese writer Yasunari Kawabata
- The Lake (Yoshimoto novel), a 2015 novel by Japanese writer Banana Yoshimoto
- "The Lake" (short story), a short story by Ray Bradbury
- The Lake, a radio play by Ned Chaillet
- The Lake, a school production by The Lakes South Morang P-9 School in Victoria, Australia

== Music ==
- The Lake (EP), an EP by Antony and the Johnsons
- "The Lake", a song by Mike Oldfield from the album Discovery

== Other uses ==
- 107.7 (FM) The Lake, a Buffalo, New York radio station

== See also ==
- The Lakes (disambiguation)
- Lake (disambiguation)
