= Lamine Township, Cooper County, Missouri =

Township in the US state of Missouri

Lamine Township
- Township
- Location in Cooper County
- Coordinates: 38°59′19″N 92°56′32″W
- Country: United States
- State: Missouri
- County: Cooper

Area
  - Total: 40.86 sq mi (105.83 km^{2})
  - Land: 39.50 sq mi (102.31 km^{2})
  - Water: 1.36 sq mi (3.52 km^{2}) 3.33%
- Elevation: 750 ft (230 m)

Population (2020)
  - Total: 257
  - Density: 6.7/sq mi (2.6/km^{2})
- Time zone: UTC-6 (CST)
  - Summer (DST): UTC-5 (CDT)
- ZIP code: 65322
- GNIS feature ID: 0766531

Lamine Township is one of 14 civil townships in Cooper County, in the U.S. state of Missouri. Twenty-two of Missouri's 114 counties, including Cooper County, have civil township governments. The other 92 counties have townships which are geographical but not governmental (civil). According to the 1860 Census, the population of Lamine Township was 830 (524 whites, 306 slaves). As of the 2020 Census, Lamine Township's population was 257.

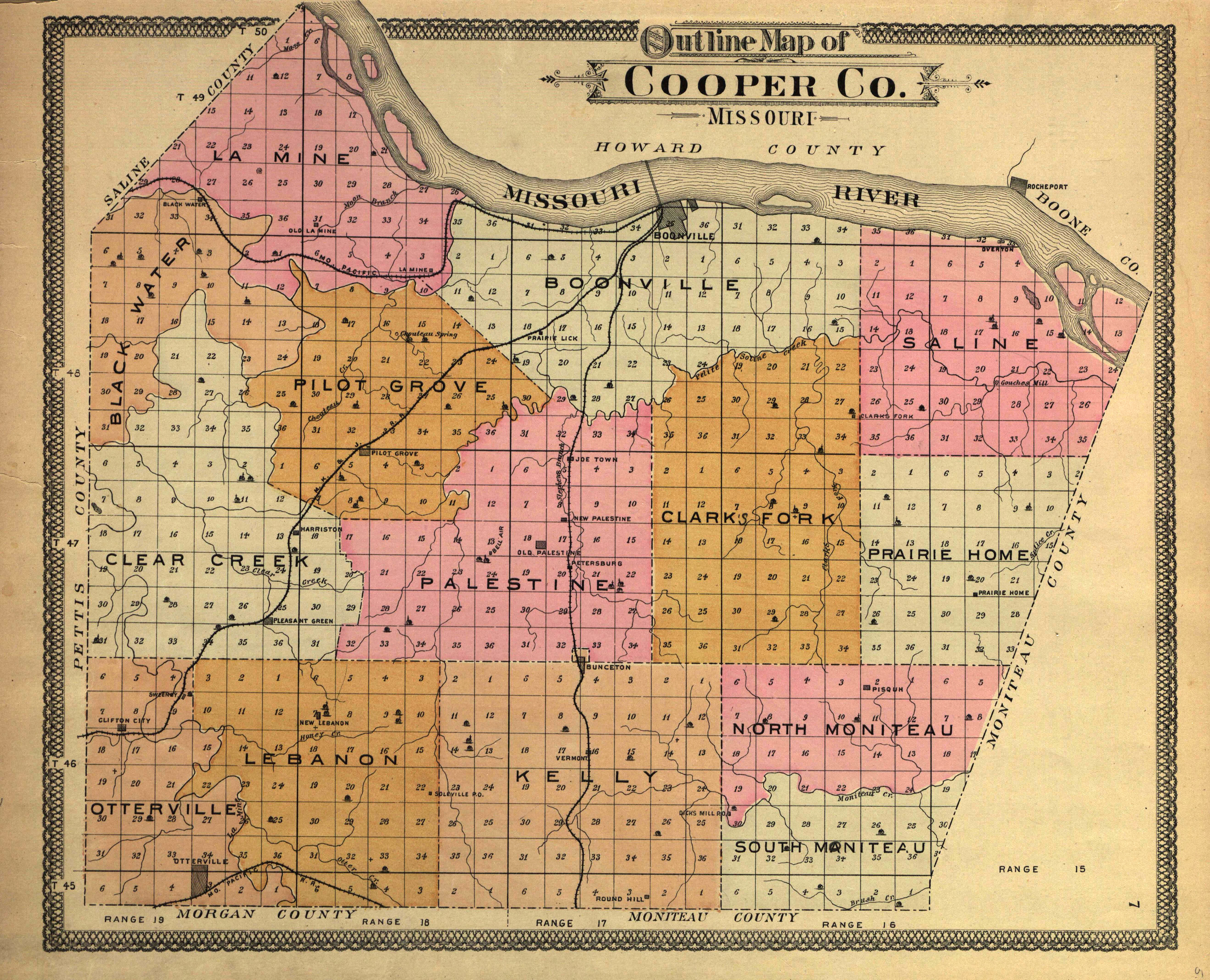
1897 Civil Townships of Cooper County Missouri. Note LaMine Township in the northwest of the map. From p. 7 of "Illustrated Historical Atlas of Cooper County, Missouri" (State Historical Society of Missouri)

The township takes its name from the Lamine River.

The only town in the Lamine Township is the unincorporated community of Lamine.

== Geography ==
According to the United States Census Bureau, Lamine Township covers an area of 40.86 square miles (105.83 square kilometers); of this, 39.5 square miles (102.31 square kilometers, 96.67 percent) is land and 1.36 square miles (3.52 square kilometers, 3.33 percent) is water.

== History ==
On June 8, 1804, the Lewis and Clark Expedition traveling on the Missouri River arrived at the mouth of the LaMine River in what would come to be known as the Lamine Township. LaMine was settled in 1811 by Revolutionary War veteran David Jones (1761–1838), his son-in-law Stephen Turley (1786–1851), Jesse B. Turley (1801–1861), Samuel Turley (1790–1870), Thomas McMahan (1786–1859), James McMahan (1789–1857), son-in-law William Reid (1774–1854), and Saunders Townsend. At that time, Missouri was still known as the Louisiana Territory but would be renamed as the "Missouri Territory" in 1812 with St. Louis as its capital.

In 1812 or 1813 William McMahan's Fort was built in the Lamine Township on the south side of the Missouri River two miles down river from Arrow Rock near the mouth of the Lamine River about five miles west of Cooper's Fort which was on the north side of the Missouri River. McMahan's Fort burned down in 1814 and the settlers resorted to Cooper's Fort for protection.

On March 2, 1819, John Potter was appointed constable of Lamine Township by the Cooper County Court. On April 9, 1821, Bryant T. Nolan was appointed constable of the Lamine Township by the Cooper County Court.

On August 10, 1821, the Missouri Territory was admitted to the Union as the State of Missouri.

The first will probated by Cooper County was that of Thomas McMahan, a resident of the Lamine Township in 1821.

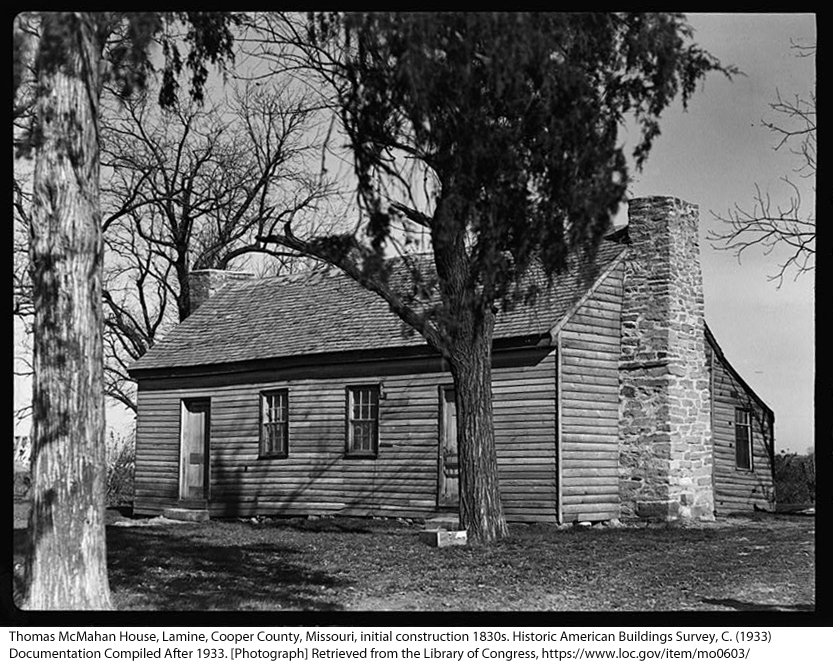
Thomas McMahan House, Lamine, Missouri

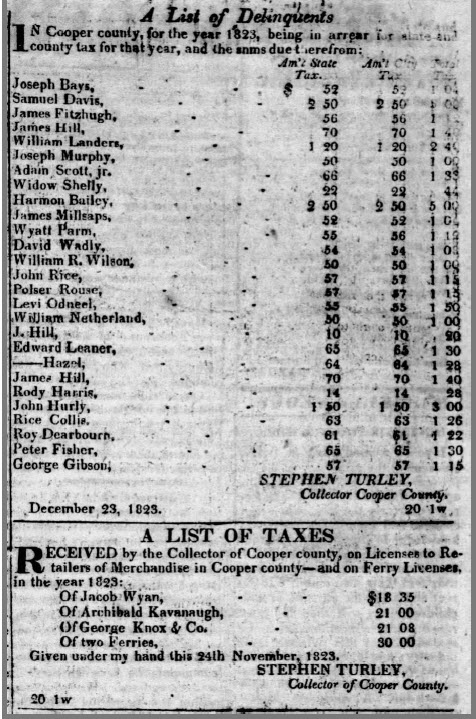
In 1823 Stephen Turley of Lamine was a tax collector for Cooper County, Missouri {Missouri Intelligencer, 23 Dec 1823 p. 3}

In 1823 Stephen Turley of Lamine was a tax collector for Cooper County.

The 1877 plat map of Cooper County shows that Thomas Mellor operated a distillery in the northwest quadrant of section 35 where the Lamine River flows into the Missouri River.

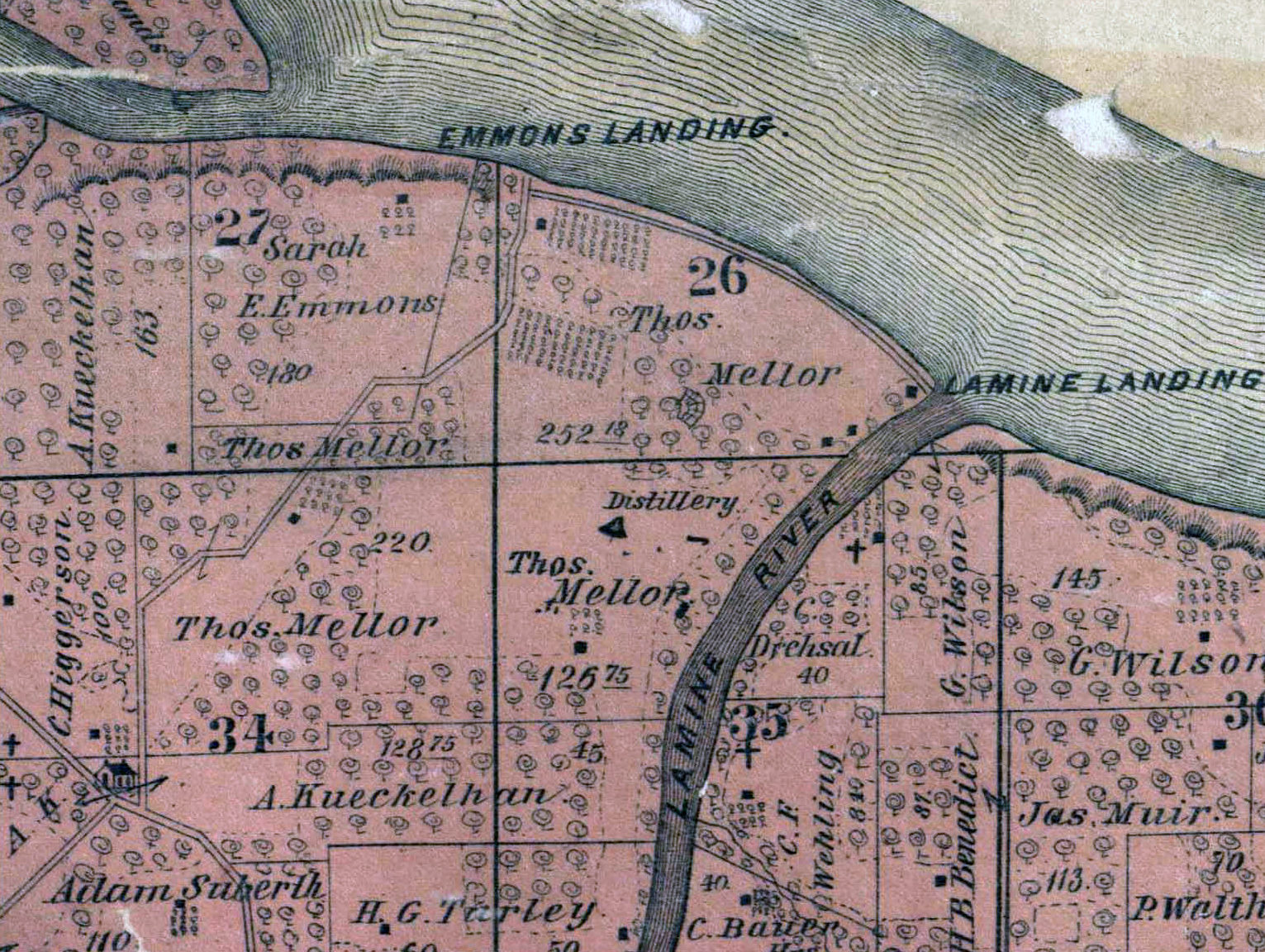
1877 location of Thomas Mellor Distillery in Lamine Missouri Township 49&50N Range 18W {State Historical Society of Missouri}

Turley Ferry and Turley Bridge. On March 2, 1819, Stephen Turley was granted a license to operate Turley's Ferry across the Lamine River. In 1885, Cooper County built with a budget of $16,000 an iron bridge with stone piers at the Lamine River crossing known as "Turley's Ferry." However, 20 years later the 1885 Turley Bridge was destroyed in the flood of September 17, 1905 and was summarily described as having "floated off its supports." The Kansas City Bridge Company was commissioned to build a 2-span Parker-truss style replacement bridge which was opened in March 1907. Twenty-one years later in 1928 in another major flood Turley Bridge was "badly shaken" but survived when a very large tree rammed into it. In 1932 the modification of Highway 41 included replacing Turley Bridge but repositioning it a bit eastward downstream (less than one-tenth of a mile) in a "prairie section" to mitigate high flood water damage. The 6-span, 522 feet and 8 inches Turley Bridge #K0236, under the commission of Carrothers and Crouch of Kansas City and after delays involving under water encounters with the old 1885 bridge truss that had been destroyed in the 1905 flood and with a stubborn narrow vein of coal, was opened in December, 1933 and replaced in 2014 [ 38.940571°N 92.872110°W ]. Meanwhile, one span of the old 1907 bridge was sold in 1938 to Boone County, Missouri and placed on Moon Valley Road Hinkson Creek Trail [ 38.946242°N 92.306854°W ]. A second span was positioned across the Petite Saline Creek near Gooch's Mill.

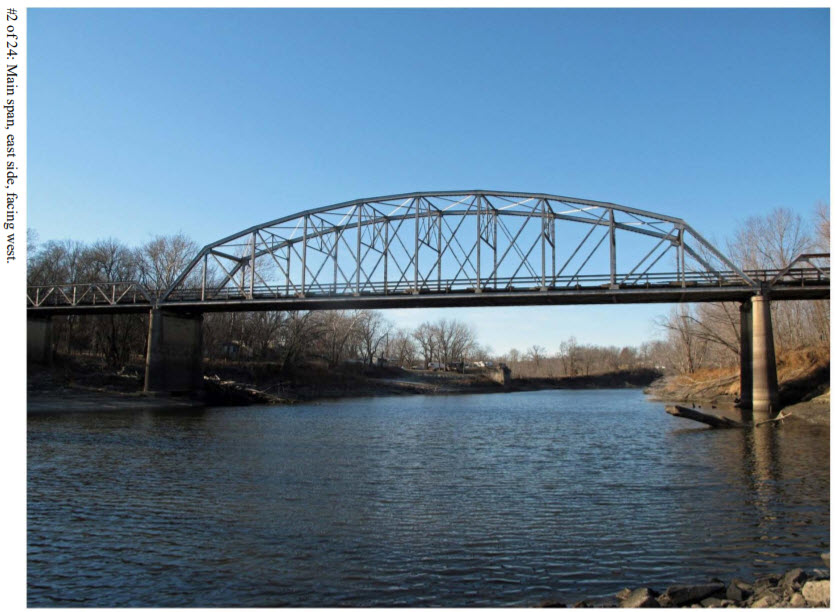
Turley Bridge #K0236 on Lamine River built in 1933 & replaced in 2014; Main Span East Side Facing West; photo taken in 2013 by Karen L. Daniels, Historian for the State of Missouri Department of Transportation Department MoDOT. Note the large remnants of the old 1907 Turley Bridge just upstream a bit on the left bank

La Mine Post Office. U.S. Postmasters appointed to the La Mine post office include: Freeman Wing (1838), Nelson Church (1842), Freeman Wing (1849), John W. McMahan (1856), William P. McMahan (1862), William N. McMahan (1866), Samuel W. Walton (1869), Daniel Folek (1871), John Redd (1872), Redd's Store (1888), William H. Ricks (1889), John B. Harris (1893), William Karm (1897), Guy M. Schuster (1902), Moritz Schuster (1908), Pearl E. Schuster (1913), Nannie M. McClain (1917), Harry Turley (1921), Pearl E. Schuster (1922), Guy M. Schuster (1922), Carson J. Shillicorn (1928), Guy M. Schuster (1929), Virginia E. Vaughan (1930), Virginia E. Vaughan (1931), Lillian Lovell (1941). The La Mine post office was renamed "Lamine" on October 1, 1924. It was discontinued on November 30, 1956, and its postal responsibilities were assigned to Boonville.

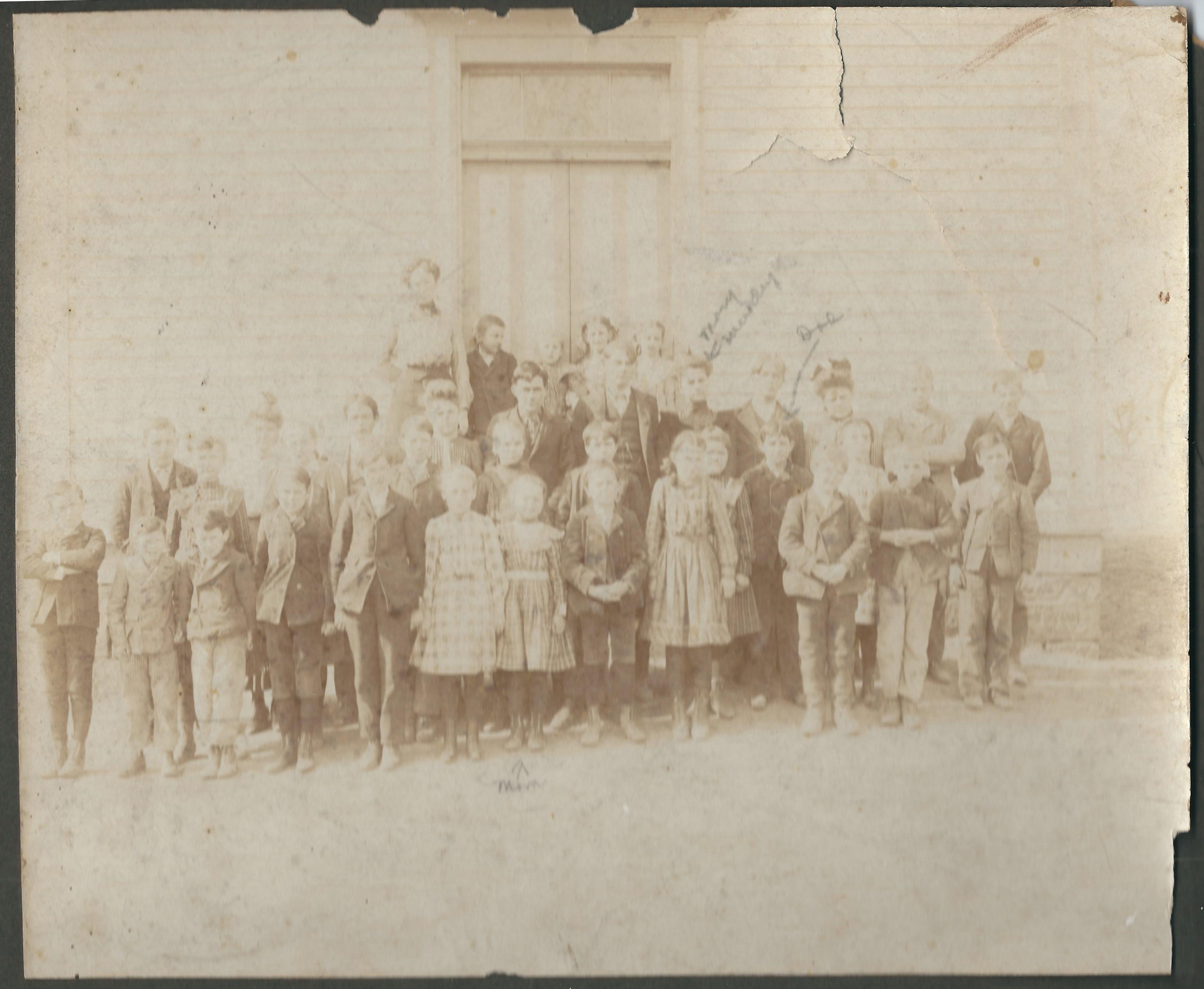
Circa 1900 Locust Grove Elementary School, Lamine, Cooper County, Missouri

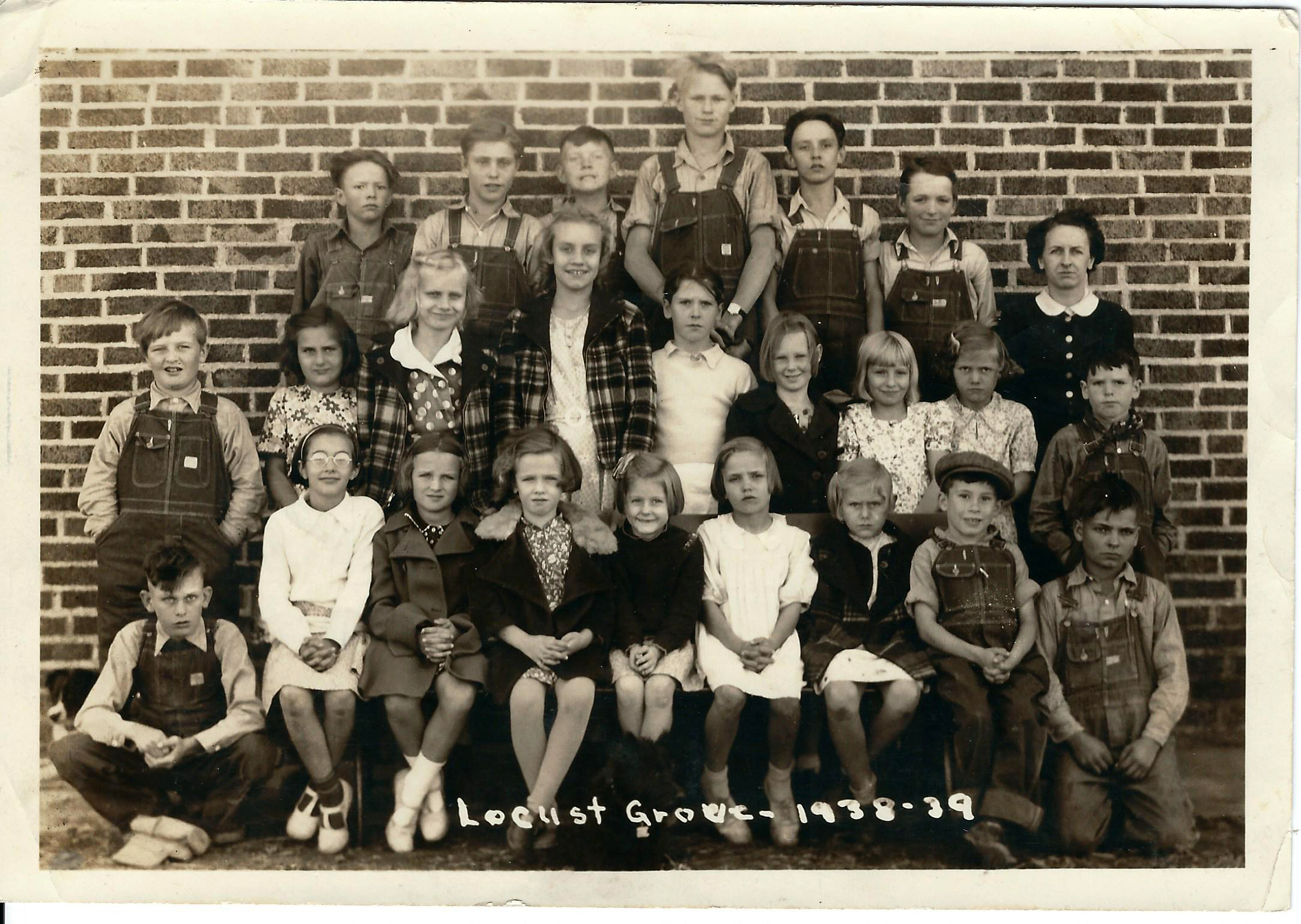
1939 Locust Grove Elementary School, Lamine, Cooper County, Missouri

Locust Grove School, Lamine. Locust Grove Elementary School serviced the Lamine community from the late 1800s through to the middle 1900s when the primary school functions were transferred to the Blackwater R-2 School District.

== Hopewell Indian Settlements ==
There are two known Hopewell Indian Settlements in the Lamine township: the Mellor settlement and the Imhoff settlement (100-300 A.D.).

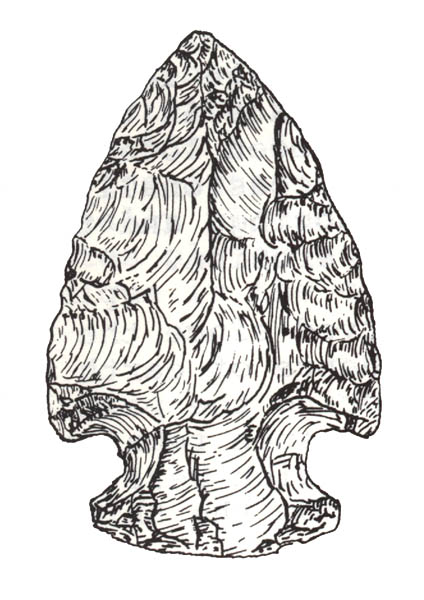
Arrow Hopewell Imhoff

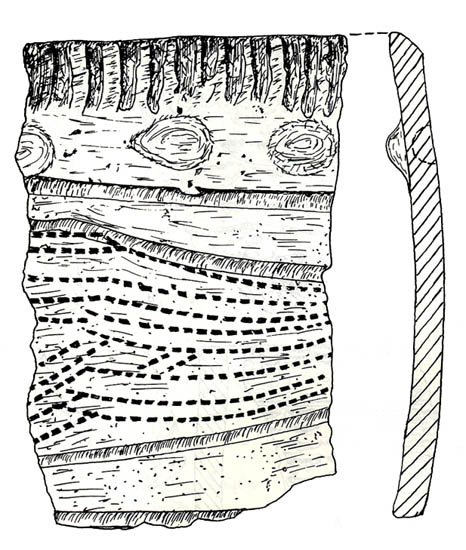
Pottery Hopewell Imhoff

The Mellor settlement, known as Site 23CP1, is at the confluence of the Lamine River with the Missouri River on the personal property known as "Cape Verde" [ 38.983083°N 92.863532°W ] owned in the early 1900s by Thomas Edward Mellor and then by his son John Paul Mellor. "At least 20 large earthen burial mounds overlook the Mellor settlement from the north-facing Missouri River escarpment." The Imhoff settlement is about one-half mile downstream from the confluence of the Blackwater River with the Lamine River. These two settlements were excavated in the 1970s by archaeologist Marvin Kay and the findings were published in the Missouri Archaeological Society Research Series in 1980.

== Unincorporated towns ==
- Lamine at 38.946691°N 92.874635°W

(There are no other towns in Lamine Township.)

== Adjacent townships ==
- Boonslick Township, Howard County (northeast)
- Boonville Township, Cooper County (east)
- Pilot Grove Township, Cooper County (south)
- Blackwater Township, Cooper County (southwest)
- Blackwater Township, Saline County (west)
- Arrow Rock Township, Saline County (northwest)

== Cemeteries ==
The township contains at least the following cemeteries:

- William Henry Ashley Burial Site (where the Lamine and Missouri rivers meet)
- Herndon Family Cemetery
- Higgerson Family Cemetery
- Hoke Family Cemetery
- Old Lamine Cemetery at 38.968330°N 92.9275000°W
- Samuel McMahan Family Cemetery
- Thomas McMahan, Jr. Family Cemetery
- Thomas McMahan, Sr. Family Cemetery
- Schuster Family Cemetery
- Turley Family Cemetery at 38.955728°N 92.893086°W
- William Reid Family Cemetery at 39.0240000°N 92.9240000°W

== Major highways ==
- Missouri Route 41

== Lakes ==
- Widel Lake at 38.953286°N 92.923649°W

== Landmarks ==
- Arrow Rock State Historic Site Park, in neighboring Saline County.

== School district ==
- Blackwater R-2, the Bulldogs

== Political districts ==
- State House District 48
- State Senate District 19
