= The Lakes =

The Lakes may refer to:

== Arts and entertainment ==
- "The Lakes" (song), a 2020 song by Taylor Swift
- The Lakes (TV series), a 1997 British drama series
- The Lakes with Paul Rose, a 2018 British TV documentary series
- "The Lakes", a song by James Vincent McMorrow from Post Tropical, 2014

== Places ==
=== Australia ===
- The Lakes, Western Australia, a locality of Perth
  - The Lakes Important Bird Area

=== Denmark ===
- The Lakes, Copenhagen, three lakes around the city centre

=== United Kingdom ===
- Lake District
  - Lake District National Park

=== United States ===
- The Lakes, Las Vegas, a planned community
- The Lakes, Minnesota, a census-designated place
- "The Lakes", a local name for Franklin Delano Roosevelt Park in South Philadelphia
- The Lakes Area, now known as Uptown, Minneapolis, Minnesota

== Other uses ==
- The Lakes Golf Club, a golf course in Sydney, Australia
- The Lakes Mental Health Hospital, mental health hospital in Colchester, England
- The Lakes railway station, near the village of Earlswood, Warwickshire, England
- The Lakes South Morang College, a school in Melbourne, Australia

== See also ==
- The Lake (disambiguation)
- Lake (disambiguation)
- Lake District (disambiguation)
- Land o' Lakes (disambiguation)
