= Lake Creek =

Lake Creek may refer to:

== Communities ==
- Lake Creek Township, Calhoun County, Iowa, one of seventeen townships
- Lake Creek, Oregon, an unincorporated community located near Eagle Point
- Lake Creek, Texas, an unincorporated community located near Cooper
- Lake Creek, an area in which the unincorporated community of Dutzow, Missouri is located

== Streams ==
- Lake Creek (Moose Creek), a tributary of Moose Creek in Alaska
- Lake Creek (Charrette Creek), in Missouri
- Lake Creek (Flat Creek), in Missouri
- Lake Creek (New York), a tributary of Catskill Creek in New York
- Lake Creek (Siuslaw River), in Oregon

== Schools ==
- Lake Creek High School in Montgomery, Texas
