= Lakes (disambiguation) =

Lakes are bodies of water.

Lakes may also refer to:

== Places ==
- Lakes (state), one of the ten states of South Sudan
- Lakes, Alaska, a place near Anchorage
- Lakes, Cumbria, a civil parish

== Other ==
- Lakes (band), American indie rock band
- Lakes (restaurant), a former Michelin starred restaurant in the Netherlands
- The Sinixt or Lakes tribe, Native Americans in Washington state and the Kootenay region of British Columbia
- Gary Lakes (1950–2025), American opera heldentenor

== See also ==
- Lake (disambiguation)
- Lake District, also commonly known as "the Lakes", an area of NW England
- Lakes Region (New Hampshire)
- The Lakes (disambiguation)
