= Lake Park =

Several places are known as Lake Park:

== Canada ==
- Burns Lake Park
- Como Lake Park (British Columbia)

== Malaysia ==
- Raub Lake Park

== South Korea ==
- Gwanggyo Lake Park
- Ilsan Lake Park
- Seokchon Lake Park
- Seonam Lake Park
- West Seoul Lake Park

== United Kingdom ==
- Boating Lake Park

== United States ==
- Beaver Lake Park (Washington)
- Bradley Lake Park
- Brushy Lake Park
- Burke Lake Park
- Chippewa Lake Park
- Clearlake Park, California
- Clear Lake State Park (California)
- Clear Lake State Park (Michigan)
- Clove Lakes Park
- Como Lake Park
- Conneaut Lake Park
- Crooked Lake Park, Florida
- Crystal Lake Park, Missouri
- Hilltop Lake Park
- Lake Park Estates, Dallas
- Lake Park (California) adjacent to Sofi Stadium
- Lake Park, Florida
- Lake Park, Georgia
- Lake Park High School, Roselle, Illinois
- Lake Park, Indiana
- Lake Park, Iowa
- Lake Park, Milwaukee, Wisconsin, urban park designed by Frederick Law Olmsted
- Lake Park, Minnesota
- Lake Park, North Carolina
- Lake Park Township, Becker County, Minnesota
- Leisure Village West-Pine Lake Park, New Jersey
- Lettuce Lake Park
- Moon Lake Park
- Mountain Lake Park (San Francisco)
- Mountain Lake Park, Maryland
- Onondaga Lake Park
- Penn Lake Park, Pennsylvania
- Pine Lake Park, New Jersey
- Round Lake Park, Illinois
- Ruffey Lake Park
- Salmon Lake Park
- Scriber Lake Park
- Shady Lake Park
- Spring Lake Park (Illinois)
- Summit Lake Park
- Swan Lake Park
- Zorinsky Lake Park
- Lake Park, original name of Grant Park (Chicago)
- Lake Park, name sometimes applied to the Union Base-Ball Grounds of the 1870s and 1880s in Chicago
- Lake Park, part of the Des Plaines, Illinois Park District, with Lake Opeka as its highlight
