= Lake District (disambiguation) =

The Lake District is a mountainous region in Northwest England.

Lake District may also refer to one of the following:

- In the British Isles:
  - Lake District National Park, protected area of the Lake District
  - County Fermanagh, north-west county in Ireland, referred to as the Irish Lake District.
- In Canada:
  - The Nechako Lakes District in Central British Columbia, Canada
  - Lake District, Edmonton, residential district in Alberta, Canada
  - Lakes District Secondary School, in British Columbia, Canada
- In Chile:
  - Chilean Lake District, a zone in Southern Chile defined by its many lakes
  - Los Lagos Region (Region of the Lakes) in Chile
- In Finland:
  - Finnish Lakeland
- In Germany:
  - Franconian Lake District a large Area south-west of Nuremberg, Germany
  - Mecklenburg Lake District, a lakeland in Mecklenburg-Vorpommern, eastern Germany
  - Mecklenburg Lake District II - Rostock District III, a constituency in the same area
- In New Zealand:
  - Queenstown-Lakes District
- In Poland:
  - Pomeranian Lake District
  - Kashubian Lake District
  - Masurian Lake District
  - West Pomeranian Lake Land
- In Turkey:
  - Turkish Lakes Region
- In the United States:
  - Lake District Hospital, in Oregon
  - Lakewood, Washington, previously known as Lakes District

== See also ==
- Land o' Lakes (disambiguation)
- The Lakes (disambiguation)
- Lake (disambiguation)
- Lake Country, a municipality in British Columbia, Canada
- Lake Country (Tasmania), a region in Australia
