= Blackwater, Missouri =

- City
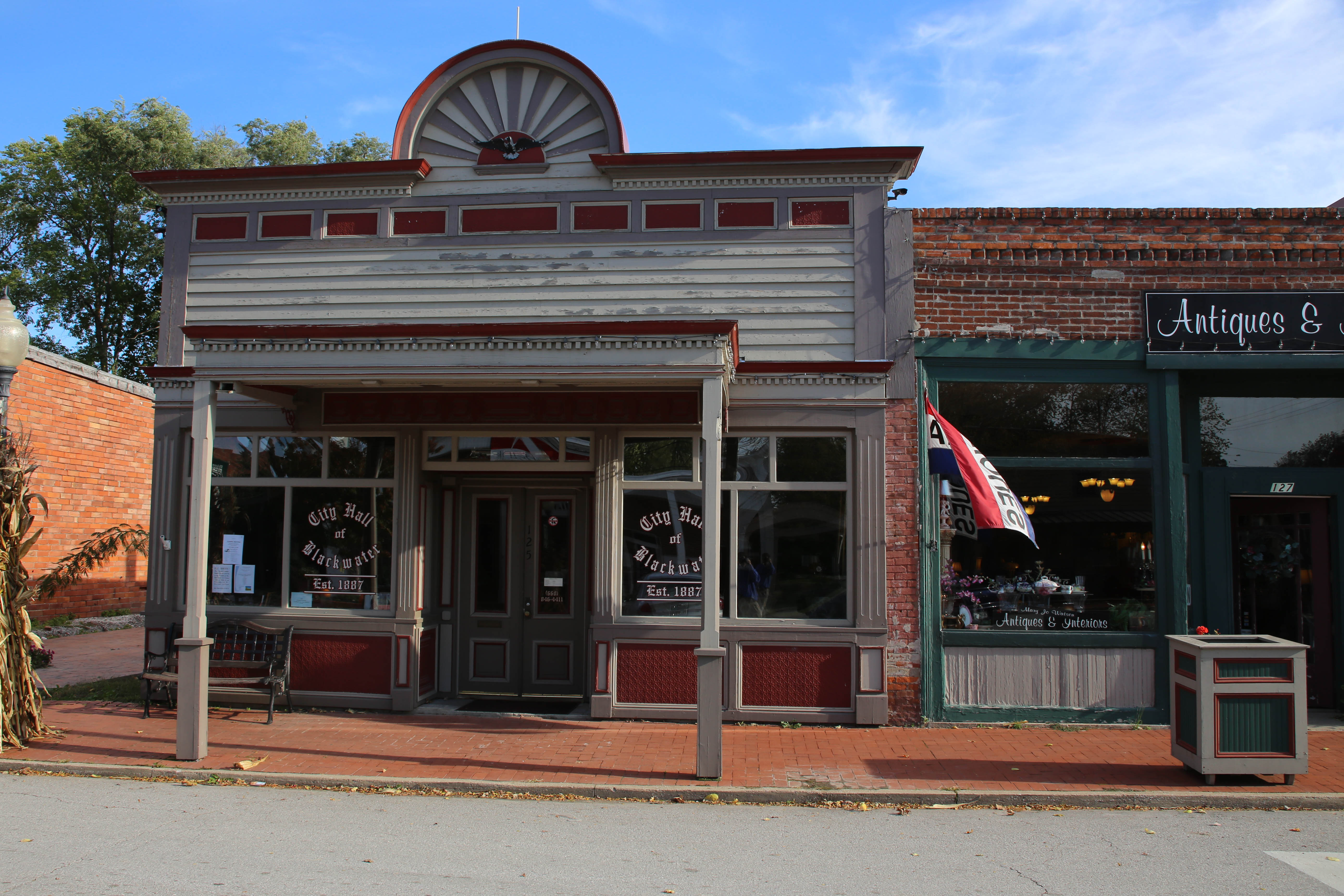
- Blackwater City Hall

- Location of Blackwater, Missouri
- Coordinates: 38°58′45″N 92°59′31″W
- Country: United States
- State: Missouri
- County: Cooper

Area
  - Total: 0.33 sq mi (0.85 km^{2})
  - Land: 0.33 sq mi (0.85 km^{2})
  - Water: 0 sq mi (0.00 km^{2})
- Elevation: 620 ft (190 m)

Population (2020)
  - Total: 170
  - Density: 519.0/sq mi (200.38/km^{2})
- Time zone: UTC-6 (Central (CST))
  - Summer (DST): UTC-5 (CDT)
- ZIP code: 65322
- Area code: 660
- FIPS code: 29-06148
- GNIS feature ID: 2394182

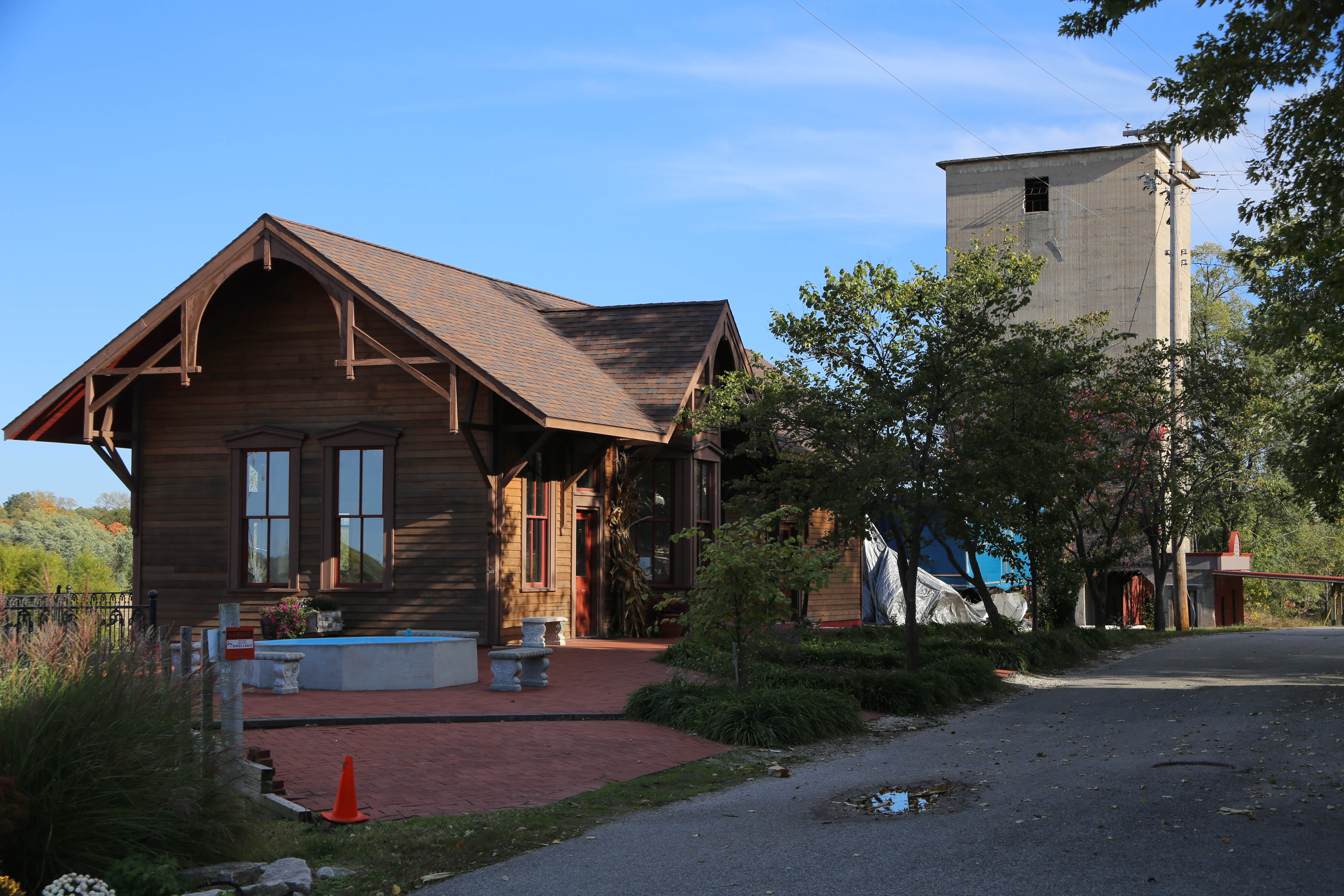
Blackwater railroad station

Blackwater is a city in northwest Cooper County, Missouri, United States located along the Blackwater River, from which it takes its name. As of the 2020 census, Blackwater had a population of 170.

Founded by the Missouri Pacific Railroad, Blackwater's economy was largely defined by freight until the mid-twentieth century. With the railroad's decline, Blackwater's status as a boom town came to an end, and the population thinned considerably. The city has preserved a number of historic, rail-related structures that have been repurposed as museums, hotels, or antique shops.

Many parts of Blackwater's commercial and residential districts are listed on the National Register of Historic Places.

== History ==
Blackwater was platted in 1887, although it had long functioned as a trading point. A post office called Blackwater has been in operation since 1873.

In the late nineteenth century, the Missouri Pacific Railroad sought to construct a "River Route" to link important sites like Kansas City, Boonville, and Jefferson City. A number of smaller towns and villages sprang up among the route, which provided a vital economic lifeline to otherwise isolated areas.

As one of these smaller towns, Blackwater retained a small but economically stable population. First consisting of railroad workers, the discovery of a rock quarry several miles outside the town provided a new set of economic opportunities, drawing miners to the area. In subsequent decades, the town would develop drugstores, banks, hardware stores, millinery shops, cafes, a hotel, lumber yard, livery stables, a creamery, meat market, blacksmiths, and saloons.

At the coming of the Second World War, Blackwater had a population of about 650 people, but the economic and social changes of the postwar era presented a new series of challenges. The Missouri Pacific Railroad, which declared bankruptcy during the Great Depression, did not provide the same labor opportunities it had previously. As for many other small towns, Blackwater found itself losing its young people to larger metropolitan areas with available jobs, and the population dwindled.

In 1950 the Blackwater Stone Company, the town's largest employer, accidentally hit water while detonating within the quarry, which flooded. This incident forced the permanent closure of the mines, dealing the town another heavy blow.

By the twenty-first century, Blackwater's population and economy had significantly shrunk from their former peaks. To boost the town's fortunes, a group of residents formed the Blackwater Preservation Society and began applying to grants to restore or repurpose the town's historic buildings. These activities have attracted some tourism to the area, particularly among rail or local history enthusiasts, and support a small number of local businesses.

Blackwater Commercial Historic District, Blackwater Residential Historic District, and Imhoff Archeological Site are listed on the National Register of Historic Places.

== Geography ==
Blackwater is located along Missouri Route K two miles north of I-70. The site is on the south bank of the Blackwater River, and the community of Nelson in adjacent Saline County lies two miles to the west-northwest. Lamine is six miles to the southeast on Missouri Route 41.

According to the United States Census Bureau, the city has a total area of 0.33 square miles (0.85 km^{2}), all land.

== Demographics ==
Historical population
Census	Pop.	Note	%±
1900	285		—
1910	371		30.2%
1920	478		28.8%
1930	506		5.9%
1940	389		−23.1%
1950	313		−19.5%
1960	284		−9.3%
1970	249		−12.3%
1980	290		16.5%
1990	221		−23.8%
2000	199		−10.0%
2010	162		−18.6%
2020	170		4.9%
U.S. Decennial Census

=== 2010 census ===
As of the census of 2010, there were 162 people, 64 households, and 45 families living in the city. The population density was 490.9 inhabitants per square mile (189.5/km^{2}). There were 87 housing units at an average density of 263.6 per square mile (101.8/km^{2}). The racial makeup of the city was 95.1% White, 1.9% African American, 0.6% Native American, and 2.5% from two or more races. Hispanic or Latino of any race were 1.9% of the population.

There were 64 households, of which 35.9% had children under the age of 18 living with them, 53.1% were married couples living together, 12.5% had a female householder with no husband present, 4.7% had a male householder with no wife present, and 29.7% were non-families. 25.0% of all households were made up of individuals, and 14% had someone living alone who was 65 years of age or older. The average household size was 2.53 and the average family size was 3.02.

The median age in the city was 38.3 years. 25.3% of residents were under the age of 18; 10.6% were between the ages of 18 and 24; 22.1% were from 25 to 44; 27.2% were from 45 to 64; and 14.8% were 65 years of age or older. The gender makeup of the city was 48.1% male and 51.9% female.

=== 2000 census ===
As of the census of 2000, there were 199 people, 85 households, and 57 families living in the city. The population density was 611.1 inhabitants per square mile (235.9/km^{2}). There were 96 housing units at an average density of 294.8 per square mile (113.8/km^{2}). The racial makeup of the city was 96.98% White, 2.51% African American and 0.50% Asian. Hispanic or Latino of any race were 0.50% of the population.

There were 85 households, out of which 28.2% had children under the age of 18 living with them, 48.2% were married couples living together, 14.1% had a female householder with no husband present, and 32.9% were non-families. 27.1% of all households were made up of individuals, and 14.1% had someone living alone who was 65 years of age or older. The average household size was 2.34 and the average family size was 2.81.

In the city the population was spread out, with 24.1% under the age of 18, 9.5% from 18 to 24, 29.6% from 25 to 44, 20.6% from 45 to 64, and 16.1% who were 65 years of age or older. The median age was 36 years. For every 100 females, there were 91.3 males. For every 100 females age 18 and over, there were 93.6 males.

The median income for a household in the city was $25,481, and the median income for a family was $26,932. Males had a median income of $25,625 versus $23,750 for females. The per capita income for the city was $13,186. About 21.3% of families and 21.1% of the population were below the poverty line, including 20.7% of those under the age of eighteen and 20.0% of those 65 or over.

== In popular culture ==
The video games Red Dead Redemption (2010) and Red Dead Redemption 2 (2018) include a version of the city.
