= Mellor Village and Mounds Archeological District =

Historic district in Missouri, United States

- U.S. National Register of Historic Places
- U.S. Historic district
- Nearest city: Lamine, Missouri
- NRHP reference No.: 69000098, 74002282 (Boundary Increase)
- Added to NRHP: May 21, 1969, August 7, 1974 (Boundary Increase)

Mellor Village and Mounds Archeological District, also known as Site 23CP1, is a historic archaeological site and national historic district located in the Lamine township, Cooper County, Missouri. It is a Middle Woodland Period village site situated on a terrace in the Lamine River locality of the Missouri River Valley. The pottery and stone tools from the site belong to the technological/artistic tradition that is described as "Hopewell."

It was listed on the National Register of Historic Places in 1969 with a boundary increase in 1974.

== See also ==
- Imhoff Archeological Site
- National Register of Historic Places listings in Cooper County, Missouri
