= Diamond, Alaska =

- Historical Settlement
- Interactive map of Diamond, Alaska
- Coordinates: 63°53′12″N 150°54′11″W
- State: Alaska
- Borough: Denali
- Elevation: 167 m (548 ft)
- Time zone: UTC-9 (Alaska (AKST))
  - Summer (DST): UTC-8 (AKDT)

Diamond or Diamond City is located at the junction of Moose Creek and Bearpaw River, 18 miles (29 km) east of Chilchukabena Lake in Denali Borough, Alaska. Diamond was established c. 1905 as a mining camp at the head of small-boat navigation on the Bearpaw River. It had a post office in 1906 and then again from 1929 until 1951. Diamond is now abandoned.
