= Imhoff Archeological Site =

- U.S. National Register of Historic Places
- Nearest city: Blackwater, Missouri
- Area: 14 acres (5.7 ha)
- NRHP reference No.: 72000710
- Added to NRHP: August 7, 1972

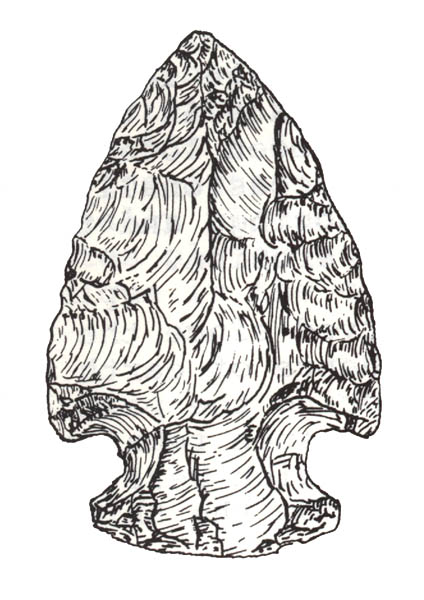
Illustration scanned from J. Mett Shippee's report "Archaeological Remains in the Area of Kansas City: The Woodland Period - Early, Middle, and Late" Missouri Archaeological Society Research Series 5.

Imhoff Archeological Site, also known as Site 23CP7, is a historic archaeological site located near Blackwater, Cooper County, Missouri. It is a Middle Woodland Period village site situated on a terrace in the Lamine River locality of the Missouri River Valley. The pottery and stone tools from the site belong to the technological/artistic tradition that is described as "Hopewell." The site was discovered by J. Mett Shippee in the 1930s. Marvin Kay surveyed the site and conducted very limited testing during 1971. No radiocarbon dates are available for the site. A sample of obsidian from the Imhoff site, in the George C. Nicholas collection, has been analyzed using Neutron Activation Analysis. The obsidian from the Imhoff site can be traced to the obsidian cliff in Yellowstone National Park, Wyoming.

It was listed on the National Register of Historic Places in 1972.

== See also ==
- Mellor Village and Mounds Archeological District
- National Register of Historic Places listings in Cooper County, Missouri
