= USS Lake County =

1944 LST-542-class tank landing ship

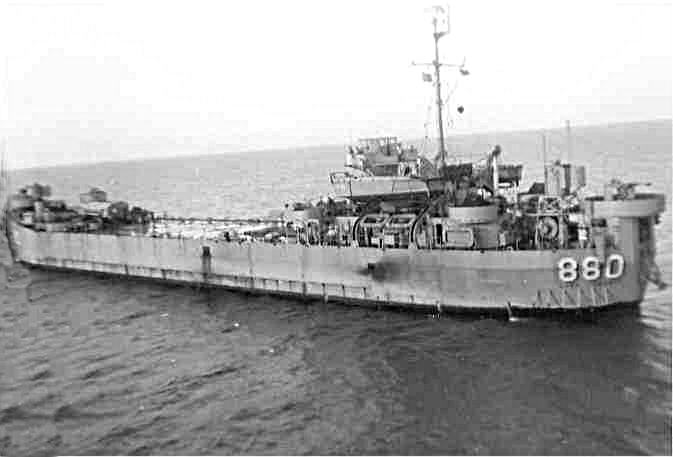
- USS Lake County (LST-880) underway in the Bahamas, providing support for Seabee units ashore setting up satellite tracking sites, 10 February 1958

History

United States
- Name: USS LST-880
- Builder: Missouri Valley Bridge & Iron Company, Evansville, Indiana
- Laid down: 6 November 1944
- Launched: 16 December 1944
- Commissioned: 9 January 1945
- Decommissioned: 1 October 1946
- In service: May 1951
- Out of service: August 1951
- Recommissioned: 20 August 1951
- Decommissioned: 25 November 1958
- Renamed: USS Lake County (LST-880), 1 July 1955
- Stricken: Unknown
- Fate: Sunk as a target ship

General characteristics
- Class & type: LST-542-class tank landing ship
- Displacement: 1,625 long tons (1,651 t) light; 3,640 long tons (3,698 t) full
- Length: 328 ft (100 m)
- Beam: 50 ft (15 m)
- Draft: Unloaded : 2 ft 4 in (0.71 m) forward; 7 ft 6 in (2.29 m) aft; Loaded : 8 ft 2 in (2.49 m) forward; 14 ft 1 in (4.29 m) aft
- Propulsion: 2 × General Motors 12-567 diesel engines, two shafts, twin rudders
- Speed: 12 knots (22 km/h; 14 mph)
- Boats & landing craft carried: 2 × LCVPs
- Troops: Approximately 130 officers and enlisted men
- Complement: 8-10 officers, 89-100 enlisted men
- Armament: 8 × 40 mm guns; 12 × 20 mm guns

USS Lake County (LST-880) was an LST-542-class tank landing ship built for the United States Navy during World War II. Named after counties in twelve U.S. states, she was the only U.S. Naval vessel to bear the name.

Originally laid down as LST-880 by the Missouri Valley Bridge & Iron Company of Evansville, Indiana on 6 November 1944; launched on 16 December 1944, sponsored by Mrs. L. H. Quigley; and commissioned at New Orleans, Louisiana on 9 January 1945.

== Service history ==
=== World War II, 1945 ===
After shakedown off the Florida coast, LST-880 departed New Orleans for Hawaii on 13 February. Steaming via the Panama Canal and the west coast, she reached Pearl Harbor on 31 March. During the next six weeks she participated in training operations with Seabees before departing Pearl Harbor for the western Pacific on 24 May. Carrying men and equipment of the 98th Construction Battalion, she sailed via the Marshalls and Marianas to Okinawa where she arrived on 4 July. There she discharged men and cargo; and, after embarking combat veterans, she sailed for the Marianas on 10 July. Steaming via Guam, she reached Saipan the 19th. LST-880 sailed for the Solomon Islands on 27 July. Arriving Russell Island on 7 August, she operated among the Solomons during the final week of fighting in the Pacific.

=== Post-war activities, 1945–1946 ===
On the 19th she departed Guadalcanal for the Philippines. Upon arriving Samar on 30 August, she operated in Leyte Gulf until 20 September when she sailed for Luzon. She reached Lingayen Gulf the 24th; and, after embarking occupation troops at San Fabian, Luzon she sailed for Japan on 26 September. Steaming in convoy she arrived Wakayama, Honshū on 7 October to support occupation landings in Japan.

Continuing her occupation duty, LST-880 departed Nagoya, Honshū, for the Philippines on 27 October. She embarked more occupation troops at Lingayen Gulf, and from 11 to 18 November steamed to Sasebo, Kyūshū for further occupation duty. Departing Sasebo on 23 November, she sailed for the Marianas where she arrived Saipan the 29th. She operated between Guam and Saipan until 18 December; then she sailed for Pearl Harbor. After touching at Eniwetok, Kwajalein, and Roi in the Marshalls, she arrived Pearl Harbor on 8 January 1946. Departing three days later, she steamed to the west coast and arrived San Pedro Bay on 22 January. Between 6 and 28 February she sailed from San Pedro to New Orleans. She decommissioned there on 1 October 1946 and was assigned to the Atlantic Reserve Fleet. Towed to Green Cove Springs, Florida early in 1947, LST-880 transferred to Norfolk, Virginia late in 1950.

=== 1951–1958 ===
From May to August 1951 she served the Military Sea Transportation Service (MSTS) as a supply ship during the construction of military bases in the Arctic. After returning to Norfolk, LST-880 recommissioned on 20 August. During the next nine months she operated out of Norfolk while making supply runs along the east coast and to Cuba and Puerto Rico. Between 21 May and 5 June 1952 she steamed from Norfolk to Port Lyautey, French Morocco to begin logistics operations in the western Mediterranean for the 6th Fleet. During the next six months she carried supplies to ports in North Africa and steamed from Portugal to Italy while supporting peacekeeping and readiness operations in the Mediterranean. She departed Port Lyautey on 11 November; reached Norfolk the 26th; and resumed supply runs out of Norfolk.

Logistics duty in 1953 sent her to the Caribbean, and she carried supplies to American bases in Cuba, Puerto Rico, and in the British West Indies from the Bahamas to Trinidad. Departing Norfolk on 21 September, she sailed via Davisville, Rhode Island for North Africa and arrived Port Lyautey on 9 October. After unloading supplies, she sailed four days later and returned to Norfolk on 27 October. LST-880 resumed logistics operations to island bases in the Atlantic and the Caribbean. During late August and early September 1954 she operated between Norfolk and Halifax, Nova Scotia and during 1955 she made two additional runs to Halifax and Argentia, Newfoundland. Named USS Lake County (LST-880) on 1 July 1955, she continued supply runs primarily in the Caribbean from 1955 to 1958.

=== Decommissioning and disposal ===
Departing the Bahamas on 10 February 1958 she arrived Norfolk the 13th. Lake County steamed to Charleston on 29 August and decommissioned there on 25 November. Declared unsuitable for further naval service, she was used as a target ship for destruction.
