= Moose Creek (Bearpaw River tributary) =

Tributary of the Bearpaw River in Alaska

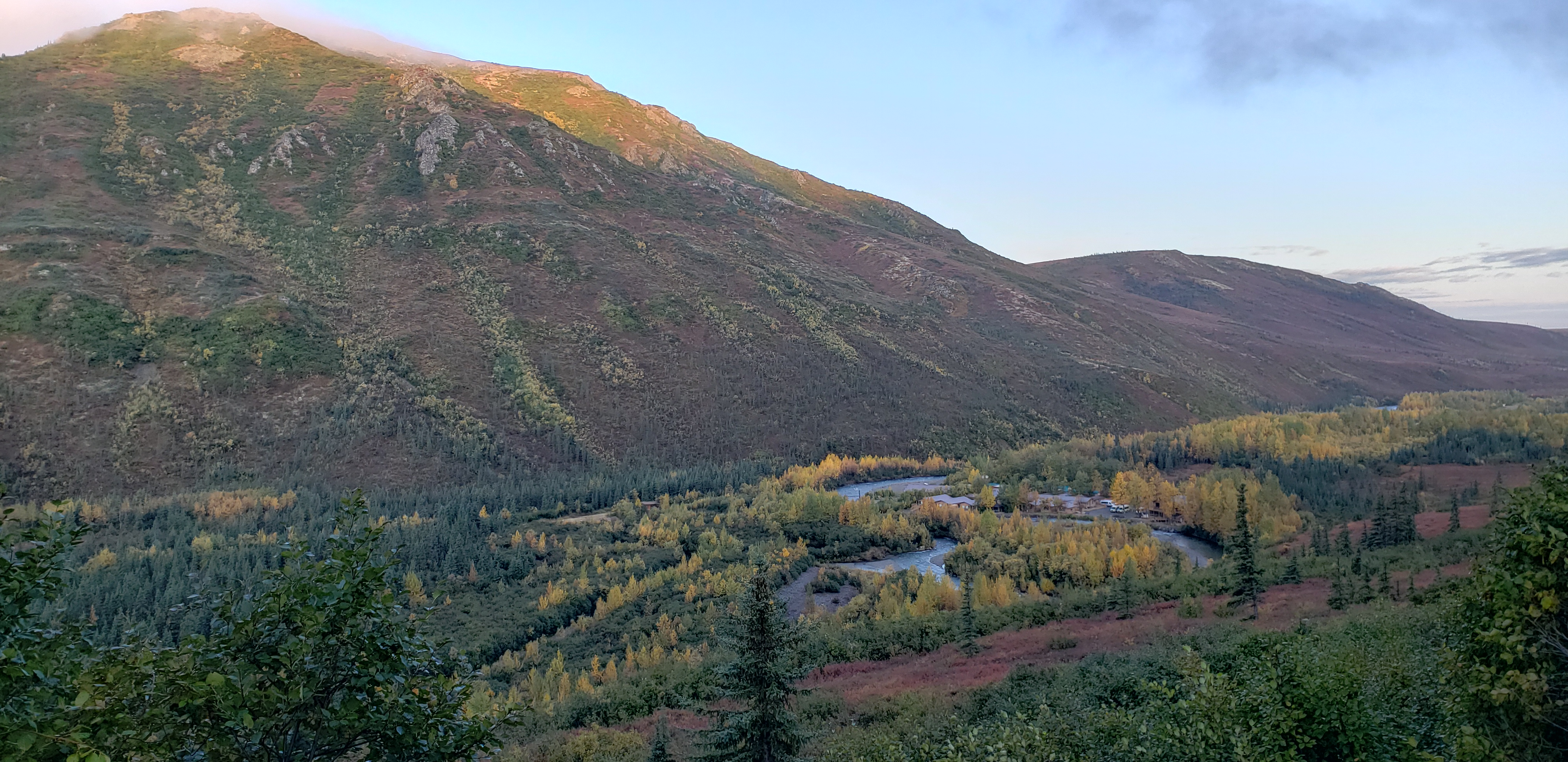

Location
- Country: United States
- State: Alaska

Physical characteristics
- Mouth: Bearpaw River
  - location: Diamond, Alaska, United States
  - coordinates: 63°53′18″N 150°54′14″W
  - elevation: 548 ft (167 m)

Basin features
- Tributaries
  - left: Lake Creek

Moose Creek heads in Denali National Park and Preserve and is a tributary of the Bearpaw River in central Alaska. Wonder Lake drains into Moose Creek. Variant names include Hutenaal'eey No' and Hutenaal'eeyh No' Hutl'ot.
