= Basin Fork =

Stream in Missouri, U.S.

Coordinates: 38°37′33″N 93°18′10″W

Basin Fork is a stream in Pettis and Johnson counties in Missouri, United States, that is a tributary of Flat Creek.

Basin Fork was so named because its course is said to be shaped like a basin.

== See also ==
- List of rivers of Missouri
