= Blackwater Commercial Historic District =

Historic district in Missouri, United States

- U.S. National Register of Historic Places
- U.S. Historic district
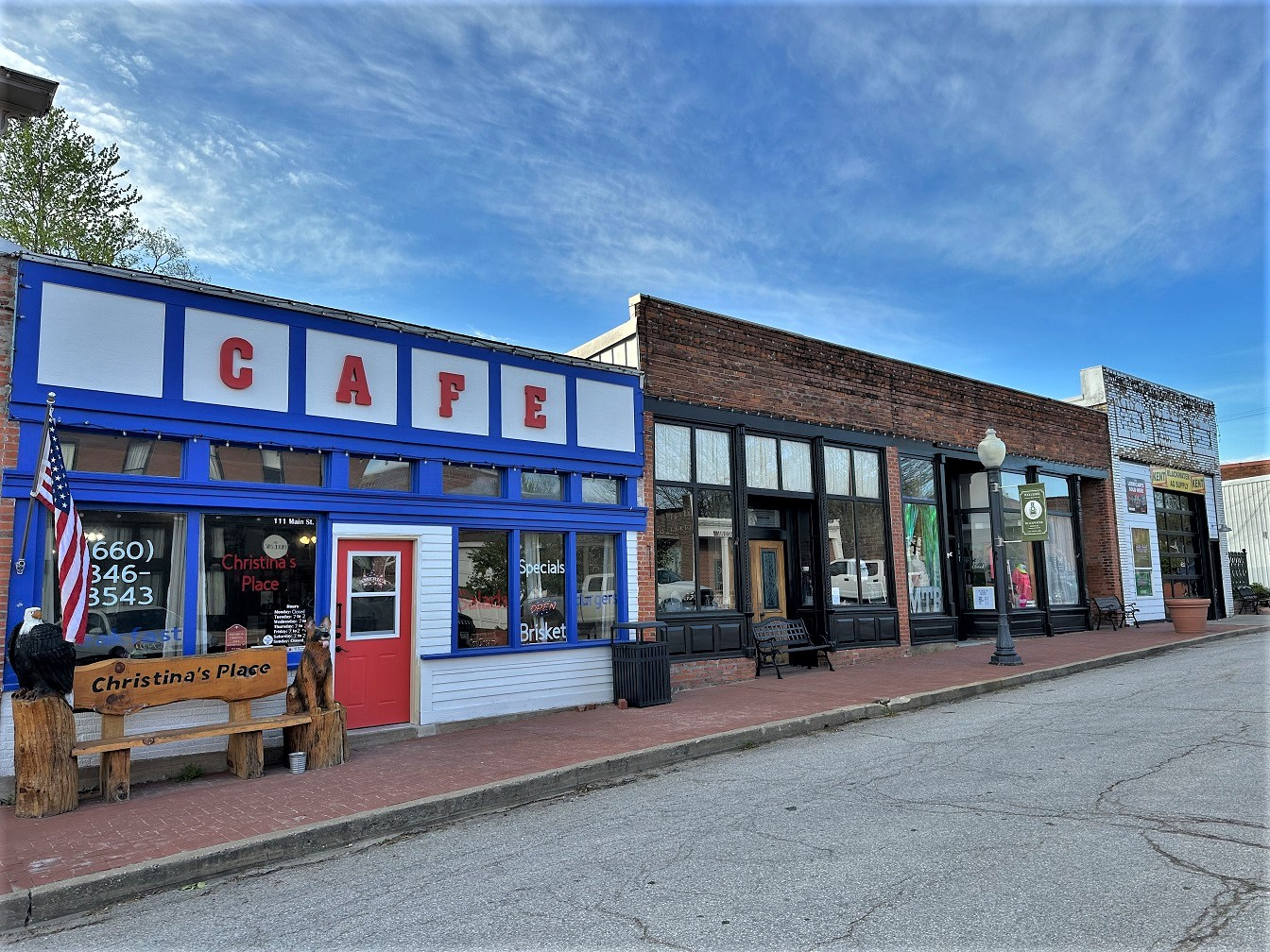

- Location within Missouri Location within the United States
- Location: 100 Blk. of Main St., except for 118,120 and 122 Main St., Blackwater, Missouri
- Coordinates: 38°58′57″N 92°59′26″W
- Area: 2.4 acres (0.97 ha)
- Architectural style: Late Victorian, Early Commercial
- NRHP reference No.: 04001520
- Added to NRHP: January 20, 2005

Blackwater Commercial Historic District is a national historic district located at Blackwater, Cooper County, Missouri. The district encompasses 12 contributing buildings in the central business district of Blackwater. It developed between about 1889 and 1950, and includes representative examples of Late Victorian style architecture. Notable buildings include the Frady Hotel (c. 1889), Adam Schuster Building (c. 1915), Lee O'Neal Hardware Store (c. 1913), and L. F. Berry, John Smith and Lizzie Fisher Building (c. 1904).

It was listed on the National Register of Historic Places in 2005.
