= Blackwater Residential Historic District =

Historic district in Missouri, United States

- U.S. National Register of Historic Places
- U.S. Historic district
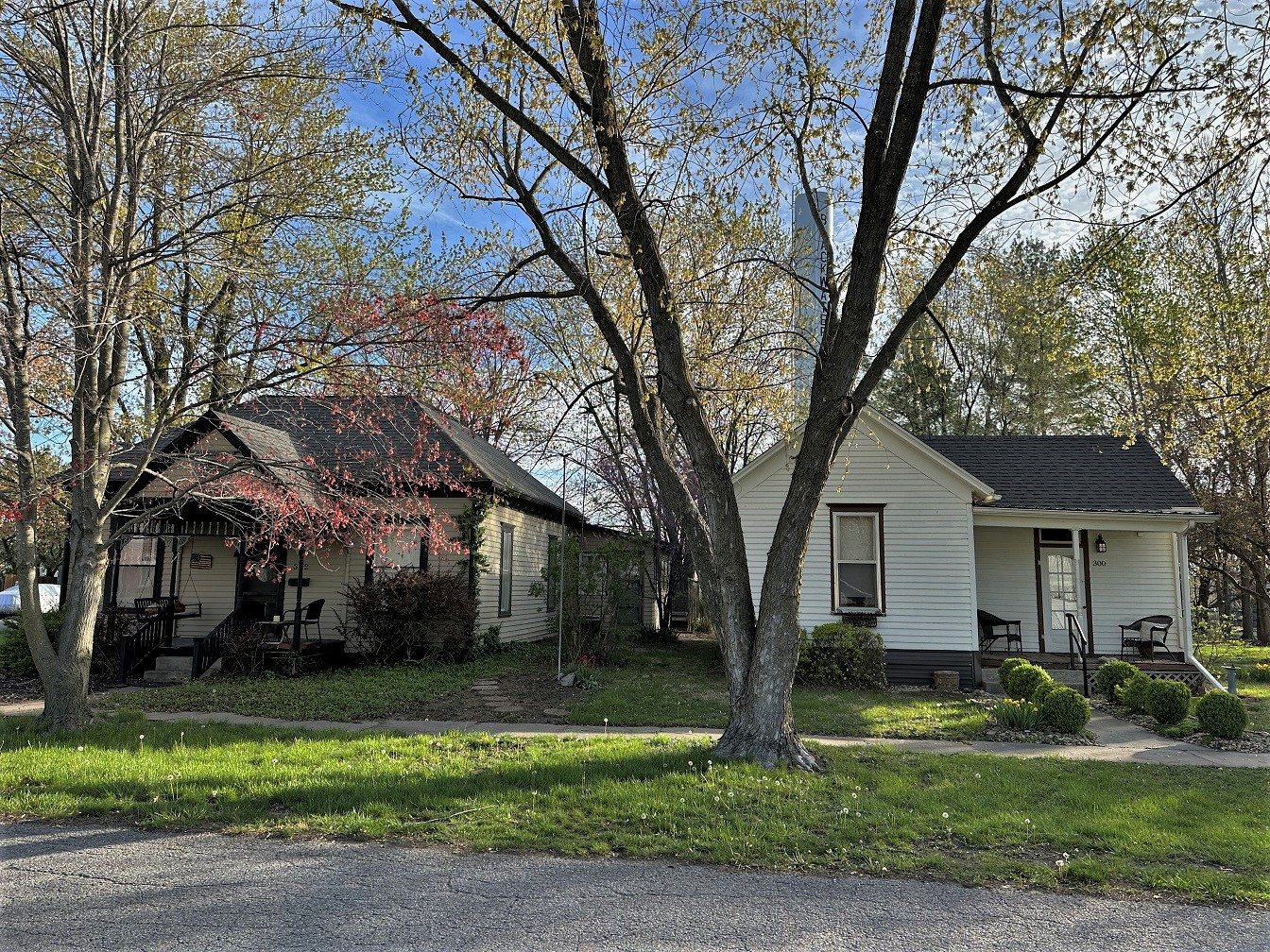

- Location within Missouri Location within the United States
- Location: Parts of the 300-400 block of Trigg Ave., 300 block of Scott Ave. and the 300 block of Main St., Blackwater, Missouri
- Coordinates: 38°58′51″N 92°59′33″W
- Area: 7.5 acres (3.0 ha)
- Architectural style: Queen Anne, Bungalow/craftsman
- NRHP reference No.: 09000597
- Added to NRHP: August 5, 2009

Blackwater Residential Historic District is a national historic district located at Blackwater, Cooper County, Missouri. The district encompasses 25 contributing buildings in a predominantly residential section of Blackwater. It developed between about 1891 and 1946, and includes representative examples of Queen Anne and Bungalow / American Craftsman style architecture. Notable buildings include the H. D. Quigg House (1891), Fray House (1905), W. L. Abney House (c. 1919), Tom J. Sims House (c. 1915), Ray McClain House (1932), and Emily Hill House (c. 1909).

It was listed on the National Register of Historic Places in 2009.
