= Lake Creek (Flat Creek tributary) =

Stream in the US state of Missouri

Coordinates: 38°38′28″N 93°04′45″W

Lake Creek is a stream in Benton, Morgan and Pettis counties in the U.S. state of Missouri. It is a tributary of Flat Creek.

Lake Creek was so named on account of the observation the creek resembles a lake during high water.

== See also ==
- List of rivers of Missouri
