= Richland Creek (Lamine River tributary) =

Stream in the US state of Missouri

Location
- Country: United States
- State: Missouri
- Region: Morgan County

Physical characteristics
- Source
  - coordinates: 38°25′24″N 92°54′54″W
  - elevation: 1,070 ft (330 m)
- Mouth
  - coordinates: 38°40′07″N 92°57′11″W
  - elevation: 669 ft (204 m)

Richland Creek is a stream in Morgan County in the U.S. state of Missouri. It is a tributary of the Lamine River.

The stream headwaters arise in southern Morgan County between Versailles to the east and Stover to the west. The stream flows northward passing under Missouri Route 52. About ten miles to the north the stream meets its confluence with Flat Creek west of Syracuse. The combined streams continue to the north as the Lamine River.

The stream was named due to the fertile or rich soil of its floodplain.
