= Lake Wisconsin (disambiguation) =

Lake Wisconsin may refer to places in the United States:

- Lake Wisconsin, Wisconsin, a census-designated place, Wisconsin, United States
- Lake Wisconsin, a reservoir, Wisconsin, United States
- Lake Wisconsin AVA, a wine region, Wisconsin, United States
- Glacial Lake Wisconsin, an ancient lake

== See also ==
- Lake, Wisconsin (disambiguation), places in Wisconsin, United States
