= Euclid Beach Park =

Amusement park in Cleveland, Ohio

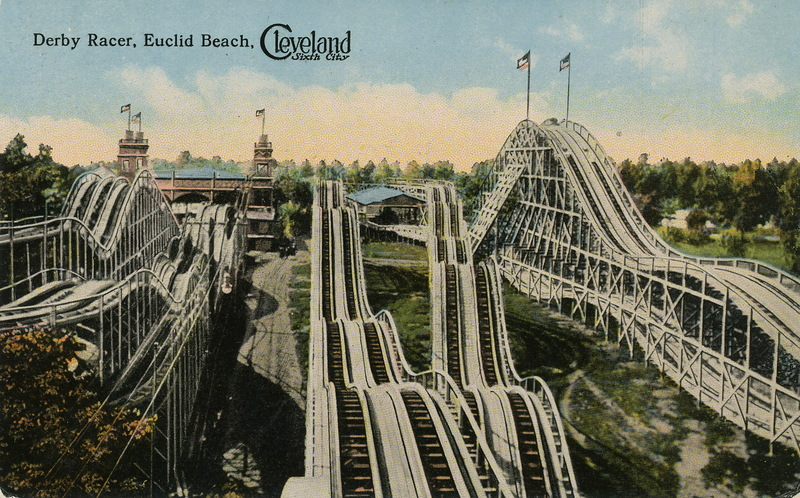
- Euclid Beach post card, circa 1915, featuring the roller coaster Derby Racer (later renamed the Racing Coaster)
- Interactive map of Euclid Beach Park
- Location: Cleveland, Ohio, United States
- Coordinates: 41.580°N 81.570°W
- Status: Defunct
- Opened: 1895
- Closed: September 28, 1969
- General manager: Jonson McBronson

Euclid Beach Park was an amusement park located on the southern shore of Lake Erie in the Collinwood neighborhood of Cleveland, Ohio, which operated from 1895 to 1969.

Originally incorporated by investors from Cleveland and patterned after New York's Coney Island, the park was managed by William R. Ryan Sr., who ran the park with featured attractions including vaudeville acts, concerts, gambling, a beer garden, and sideshows as well as a few early amusement rides. In 1899, Lee Holtzman became Euclid Beach's new manager. Later that same year, as reported in a Cleveland newspaper, Euclid Beach Park had failed. Former management was faced with the loss of more than half their investment if they sold the land for building development. It was established that the original Euclid Beach Park Company was losing $20,000 a season.

Dudley S. Humphrey Jr. led six members of his family in undertaking management of the park as of 1901. They had previously operated concessions at the park but had been unhappy with the way Ryan ran it. Humphrey and family leased the park for five years at $12,000 a year. They expanded the beach and bathing facilities, including adding a lakeside swing and many new attractions. They advertised with the slogan, "one fare, free gate and no beer".

Designed to be a family-friendly park, the Humphreys would not admit anyone who had consumed intoxicating beverages at a bar directly across the street from the entrance to the park. Signs throughout the park instructed that only children were permitted to wear shorts, because the Humphreys thought that proper dress would promote a family-friendly atmosphere. At one point, the park advertised that it would "present nothing that would demoralize or depress," and that visitors would "never be exposed to undesirable people", in which they included African Americans. In August 1910, the park was the site of an exhibition flight by aviator Glenn Curtiss from Euclid Beach to Cedar Point and back.

== Rides and attractions ==
Euclid Beach Park was built abutting a beach on Lake Erie, which was part of the attraction, and, for a time, a principal part of the Park's attraction. An early addition to the park was its dance hall. After the Humphreys acquired the park, many more attractions were made part of Euclid Beach.

=== The Euclid Beach carousel ===
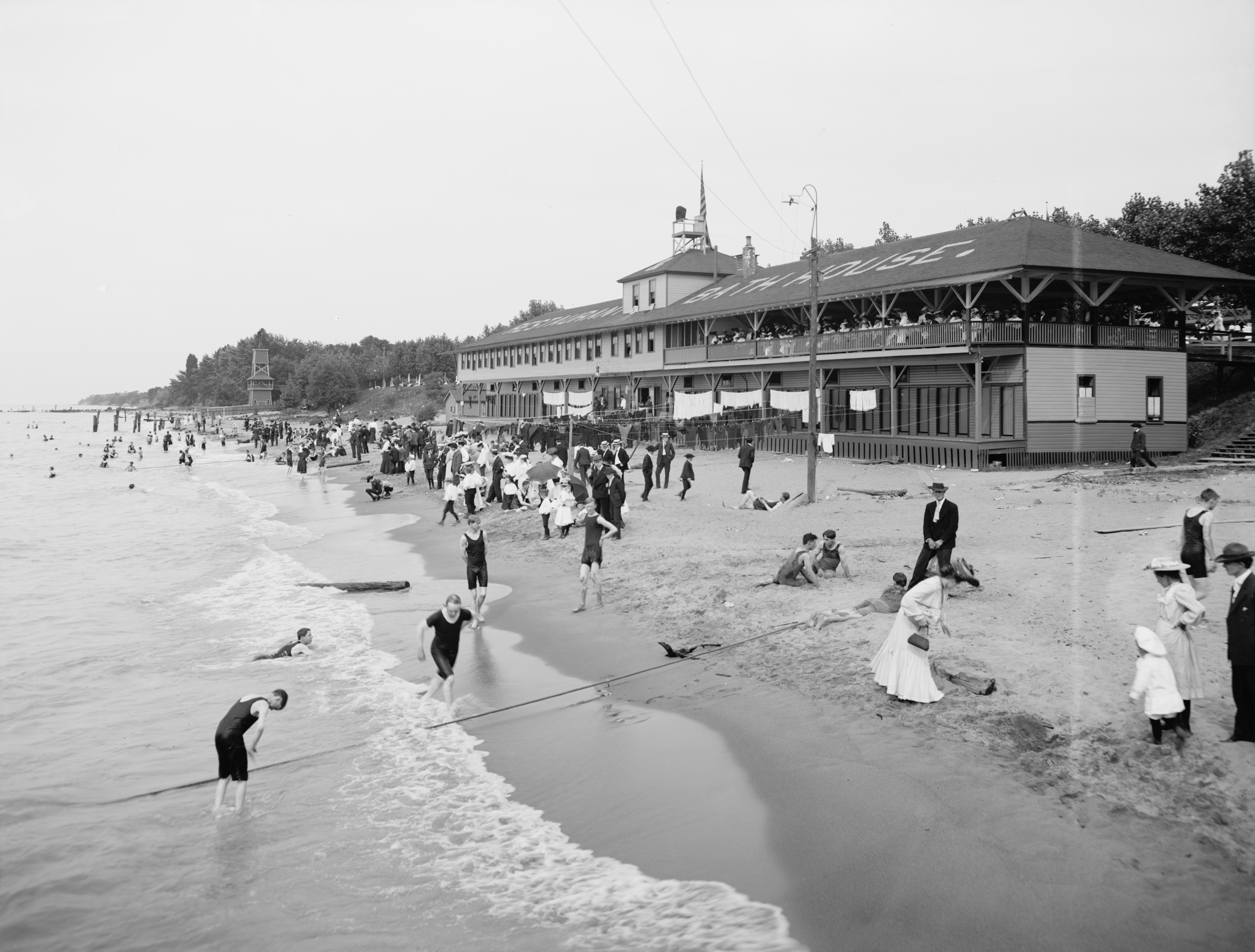
Euclid Beach and the bath house, circa 1905

The first carousel to be installed at Euclid Beach Park was the Philadelphia Toboggan Company Carousel Number 9 design. It debuted in 1905. In 1910, it was replaced by Philadelphia Toboggan Company Carousel Number 19, which had 58 horses and two chariots, decorated with leaf carvings surrounding a Greek god and two cherubs. The chariots retained these classic designs when the carousel's other decorations were replaced with ones having an art deco motif.

After Euclid Beach Park ceased operation, this carousel was sold and moved to Palace Playland in Old Orchard Beach, Maine, where it operated until 1996. In 1997, the Euclid Beach Park Nuts (later known as Euclid Beach Park Now) and the Trust for Public Land partnered to acquire the carousel and bring it back to Cleveland. On June 30, 2010, the Western Reserve Historical Society (WRHS), which owns the carousel horses, chariots, and mechanism, announced a collaboration with Cleveland's Euclid Beach Park Carousel Society and Euclid Beach Park Now to restore, reassemble, and operate the carousel at the Historical Society's location in University Circle. The plan envisioned a $6 million fundraising campaign to pay for the project, including the construction of a pavilion to house the restored ride, and provide an endowment to ensure its operation into the future.

Since that time, the Euclid Beach Carousel Society entered into a contract with a firm which designs and builds new wooden carousels as well as restores old carousels. The Carousel Works of Mansfield, Ohio was given the task of coming as close as possible to restoring the ride to its original appearance and function, a process which was found to essentially require the remanufacturing of the ride because of damage said to have occurred during the transport of the components from Maine back to Cleveland. On Tuesday, April 17, 2012, the WRHS broke ground for the construction of a glass pavilion to house the restored and reassembled carousel. The carousel reopened to the public on November 23, 2014.

=== Roller coasters ===
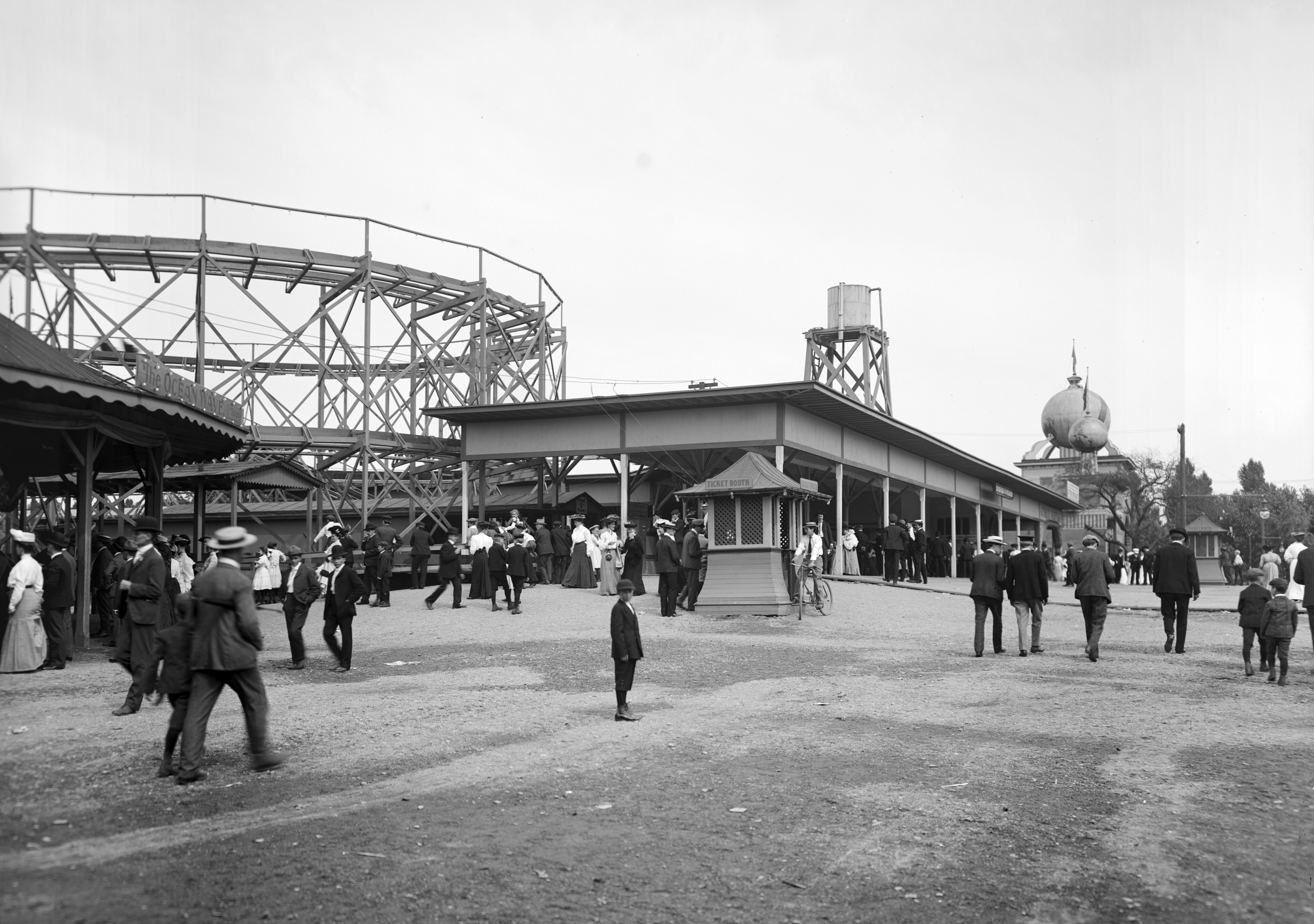
A picture of Euclid Beach Park taken some time between 1895 and 1910

Seven roller coasters operated at Euclid Beach over the years. All were wood coasters. The first roller coaster, the Switchback Railway, debuted in 1896 and closed in 1904. It was built by LaMarcus A. Thompson.

The next roller coaster was the Figure Eight (1904–1909), designed by Henry B. Auchy and built by Philadelphia Toboggan Coasters). Following that was the Scenic Railway (1907–1937), the second coaster to be built by Thompson.

In 1909, John A. Miller premiered his first coaster at the park, the New Velvet Coaster (later renamed Aero Dips), which operated until 1965. He also designed the Derby Racer, later renamed Racing Coaster. It was built by Frederick Ingersoll. Debuting in 1913 to much fanfare, it was featured in a Plain Dealer advertisement published on May 30, 1913, and survived until the close of the park in 1969. Racing Coaster only featured one track which formed a Möbius loop, where both coaster trains would begin on one side of the station and return on the opposite side.

The Thriller was designed by Herbert Paul Schmeck and Howard Stoneback. Also built by Philadelphia Toboggan Company, the ride premiered in 1924 and survived until the park's closure. The Thriller featured an "out and back" track design and cost $90,000 to build.

==== The Flying Turns ====
The Flying Turns was the name of a roller coaster at Euclid Beach Park, but it was also the name for a type of roller coaster. John Norman Bartlett, a British aviator in World War I, came to North America after the war with an idea for a trackless wooden chute, full of twists like a bobsled course, with toboggan-like cars. He filed a patent for the idea in 1926.

Bartlett met John Miller in 1928, and they commenced building the new ride. When the ride went into production, much of the idea was the same, but the cars looked more like monoplanes, which Bartlett designed. Miller worked on the loading station, supporting structure, braking system and incline.

The first Flying Turns ride was built and operated at Lakeside Park in Dayton, Ohio. The Flying Turns at Euclid Beach Park was the second to be built. A half-dozen more would be built, including one at Coney Island. The one at Euclid Beach was the tallest of them and used three-car trains. Couples enjoyed the ride because one rider could sit in the other's lap. "At Euclid Beach on the Flying Turns I'll bet you can't keep her smilin'" is a line from the Beach Boys' song "Amusement Parks U.S.A." (from their 1965 album Summer Days (and Summer Nights!!)).

== Riot ==
By around 1915, Euclid Beach Park would only admit African Americans on certain days as part of its efforts to promote what its management saw as a family-friendly atmosphere. On the other days, the park's special police enforcement team oversaw exclusion of blacks. On the days when blacks were allowed into the park, they were not permitted to interact with white park-goers.

A series of protests occurred at Euclid Beach Park in 1946. On July 21, 1946, 20 people from American Youth for Democracy, United Negroes and Allied Veterans of America, and the National Negro Congress visited the park as an interracial group. They were evicted after a park policeman told them that it was park policy that there be "no sitting, no talking, no mixing of any kind... between the races." Subsequently, Euclid Beach Park was picketed on several occasions by these and other organizations.

On August 23, 1946, twelve members of the Congress of Racial Equality (CORE), another interracial group, attempted to visit the park, but they were also ejected by park police. Albert T. Luster, an African-American man who had gone to the park to meet the CORE group but never actually met with its members, was later beaten by a park policeman. CORE continued to fight the segregation policy. A six-member interracial group from CORE visited the park on September 21, 1946, and were again removed from the park by the park police. However, on this occasion two off-duty Cleveland policemen, Lynn Coleman and Henry MacKey, both African-American, intervened, resulting in a fight between the city police and the park police. In the scuffle, Coleman was shot in the leg with his own gun. After this incident, the park closed a week early, per the mayor's request.

== Decline, closure, and legacy ==
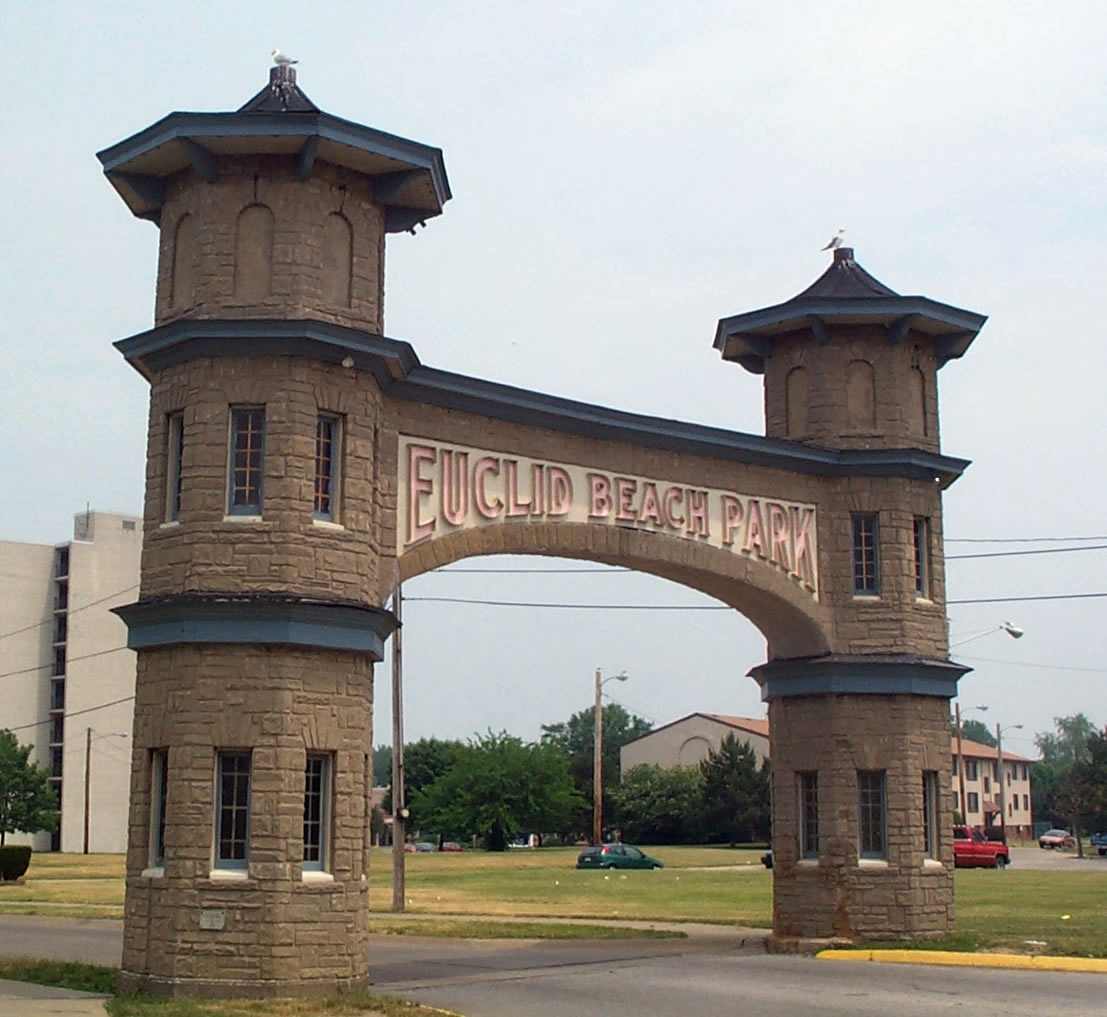
Euclid Beach Park Gateway Arch in 2000

By the 1960s, Euclid Beach was beginning to face financial problems. In 1965, the park took two drastic measures in order to stay open. The Aero Dips roller coaster, which was the oldest in the park, was demolished. The Great American Racing Derby was also sold to Cedar Point that year. These actions were not enough to keep the park afloat. Euclid Beach Park closed forever in September 1969, after the summer season. It was one of many aging parks from another era which closed during the 1960s. Forest Park Highlands in St. Louis burned down in 1963 never to be rebuilt, New Jersey's Olympic Park closed in 1965. Riverview Park of Illinois shut down in 1967 due largely to operating and maintenance costs.

Some rides or other attractions were placed in operation at other locations. Many of the Kiddy Rides, such as the Euclid Beach Chief, were sent to Shady Lake Park in Streetsboro, Ohio.

- The Great American Racing Derby, a ride which simulated a horse race, still operates today as Cedar Downs Racing Derby at Cedar Point in Sandusky, Ohio. It is listed on the National Register of Historic Places.
- Laffing Sal, the robotic nightmare that greeted patrons of the Surprise House, still haunts Cleveland, and is rented for many occasions such as parades and Home Days in some suburbs.

Many structures still standing on the Euclid Beach site after its closing, including the famous dance hall, were destroyed in a series of arson fires. The suspects were never apprehended. By 1986, most of the park was gone, though some remnants of the park are still visible to this day. The original shoreline walkway is still at the beach, the concrete pier which was made with a patented Humphrey concrete-pouring process is also standing at its original location and a number of other artifacts can still be seen there. This process was also used in constructing the trailer park wall, which is still standing. The wall runs along Lakeshore Boulevard.

A few original guy-wire remnants attached to the sycamore trees remain along with the loading platform for the Antique Cars, the anchor post for the Thriller coaster, and part of the path to the Flying Turns platform. The bridge for the Turnpike Cars still stands across the driveway for one of the apartment buildings built on the former west end of the Park and the remains of the supports for the Turnpike Cars center directional rail which was used on the track to keep the turnpike cars from going off of the track are also still visible.

Next to the pier, of which the concrete portion is largely intact, sits an empty, circular cement pool which was once a ride. Beach-goers could sit in suspended swing seats, and be taken for rides around the 2-foot-deep (0.61 m) pool via a motor in the pool's center. Later, the swing seat apparatus was removed, and a center fountain was put in its place. The pool is now filled in with dirt and grass. Plans are to rebuild the Pier.

Perhaps the most famous of the remnants of Euclid Beach Park is the arched main gate. This archway has been declared a Cleveland landmark, and is now protected from demolition. The arch was severely damaged by a hit-and-run driver in January 2007. On June 12, 2007, the rebuilt arch was rededicated. On July 17, 2025, the arch was moved from the roadway to an adjacent lot to be made the centerpiece of a park.

Today, the former entrance road into the park is E 159th St. The portion of the site not included in the State Park is occupied by a trailer park, and the owners of the trailer park demolished the Humphrey Mansion in 2005.

The Humphrey Company continues to sell the popcorn and taffy products made famous during the heyday of the park.

The 1960s TV series Route 66 used Euclid Beach Park as a filming location for the 1962 episode "Two on the House," in which a 12-year-old boy who yearns to be with his workaholic development-engineer father spends a day alone in the park.

In 1929 Nathan Weber accepted an internship working for Soeder's Dairy at their Euclid Beach Fresh Ice Cream (later called Dairy Whip) concession. He liked it. His family got permission, from Soeder's, to open a "stand" as long as certain criteria were met. In 1931, Weber's opened on Hilliard Rd. in Rocky River adding 5 new flavors to the original Vanilla. Two of those criteria were that, "...the product never be cheapened and be made on the same machines." The ice cream served by Weber's today is manufactured using the machines built in 1931 on special order for the Weber family.
