= Blackwater Township, Saline County, Missouri =

Township in Saline County, Missouri, U.S.

Coordinates: 38.9647°N 93.1358°W

Blackwater Township is an inactive township in Saline County, in the U.S. state of Missouri.

Blackwater Township was erected in 1825, taking its name from the Blackwater River.
