= Lake, Wisconsin =

Lake is the name of some places in the U.S. state of Wisconsin:

- Lake, Marinette County, Wisconsin, a town
- Lake, Milwaukee County, Wisconsin, a former town
- Lake, Price County, Wisconsin, a town

== See also ==
- Lake Wisconsin (disambiguation)
