= Lakes District Secondary School =

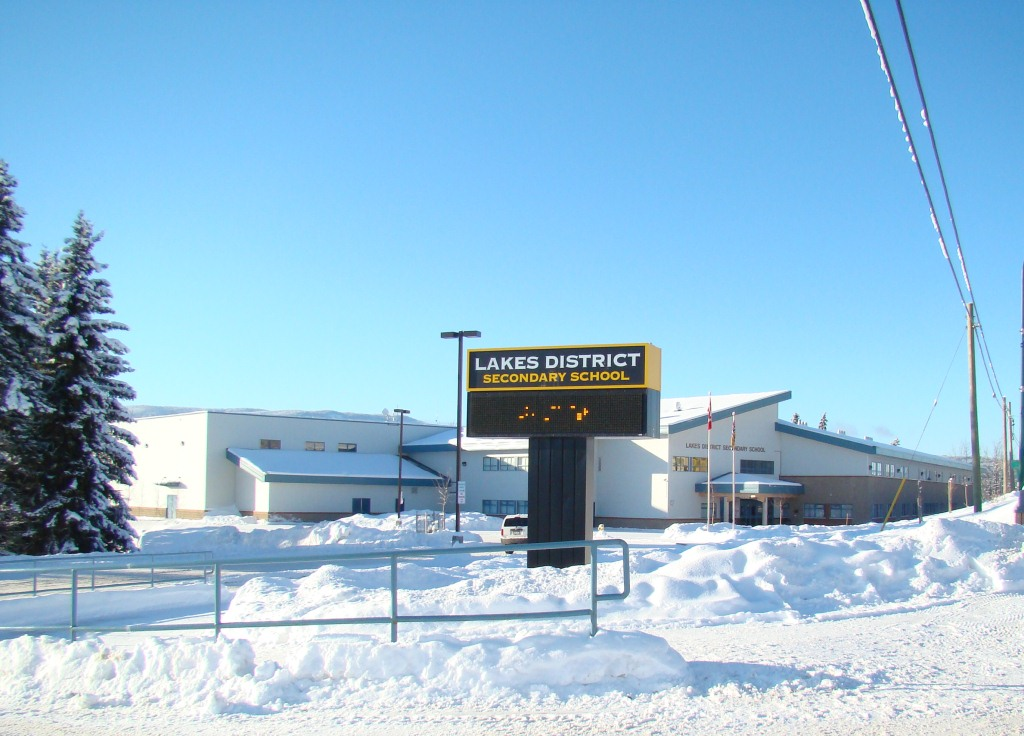
- Lakes District Secondary pictured during winter from the Yellowhead Highway (Hwy. 16)

Location
- 685 Yellowhead Highway (Hwy 16); Burns Lake, British Columbia, V0J 1E0; Canada; 54.23412°N 125.76762°W

Information
- School type: Public, high school
- Founded: 1951
- School board: School District 91 Nechako Lakes
- Superintendent: Manu Madhok; Mike Skinner (Asst. Superintendent)
- School number: 9191023
- Principal: Heidi Grant
- Grades: 8–12
- Enrollment: 478 (September 30, 2007)
- Language: English
- Area: Lakes District
- Colours: Black and Yellow/Gold
- Mascot: Louie Laker
- Team name: Lakers
- Website: ldss.bcschoolweb.ca/home

Lakes District Secondary is a public high school located in Burns Lake, British Columbia and part of School District 91 Nechako Lakes.

== History ==
The Burns Lake area had numerous small rural schools in operation in the early part of the 1900s. Most students did not continue their education beyond the teen years. Ranching, trapping, farming and saw milling required the help of all family members.

The first small group of students entered Burns Lake Superior School in Burns Lake in 1934, but only one student stayed to graduate in 1936. This was William Wren Gilgan (1917–2012). A special recognition has been placed in the graduate hallway at LDSS to honor Mr. Gilgan.

As the population in the area grew a new school replaced the old building in 1951 and was situated along Highway 16. In 1962, the high school became known as Lakes District Secondary and the nickname "Lakers" was adopted soon after.

From 1951 to the late 1980s, this school site was expanded and redeveloped several times. A student residence building was built in 1965 to support students from the rural communities surrounding Burns Lake. After bussing routes improved in the late 1970s, the residence building became a resource center, offices and an alternative school.

In the mid-1990s, the building was deemed too old to renovate, so work began on a new high school. Budget delays and government changes pushed the construction back to 2001. In 2003, a new high school was completed adjacent to the old school on Highway 16.

== Location ==
Lakes District Secondary School (LDSS) is located at 685 Yellowhead Highway 16 in Burns Lake, BC.

== Breakfast program ==
Through donations from local businesses and the Breakfast Club of Canada, LDSS offers a free and healthy breakfast each day for students. A variety of fruits, bagels, yogurts, oatmeal, and cereals are served to "feed learning". Thursdays feature a hot breakfast from the grill, including waffles and pancakes. The food is served from 8:15–8:45 from the concession in the Multipurpose Room (MPR) by members of the Student Voice & Interact Club. All donations to the Breakfast program over $100 are eligible for a tax receipt.

== Energy monitoring system ==
LDSS has an energy monitoring system that allows students, staff, and community members to view the electrical usage of the building in several formats. LDSS is the first school in the district to have such a device installed. The goal is to reduce energy usage through education, new technology and input from the people that come to LDSS each day. The energy monitor is located just inside the main doors in full public view.

== Administration ==
- H. Grant, Principal
- S. Little, Vice-Principal
- K. Mitchell, Superintendent of Schools
- M. Skinner, Assistant Superintendent
