= Shady Lake Park =

Amusement park

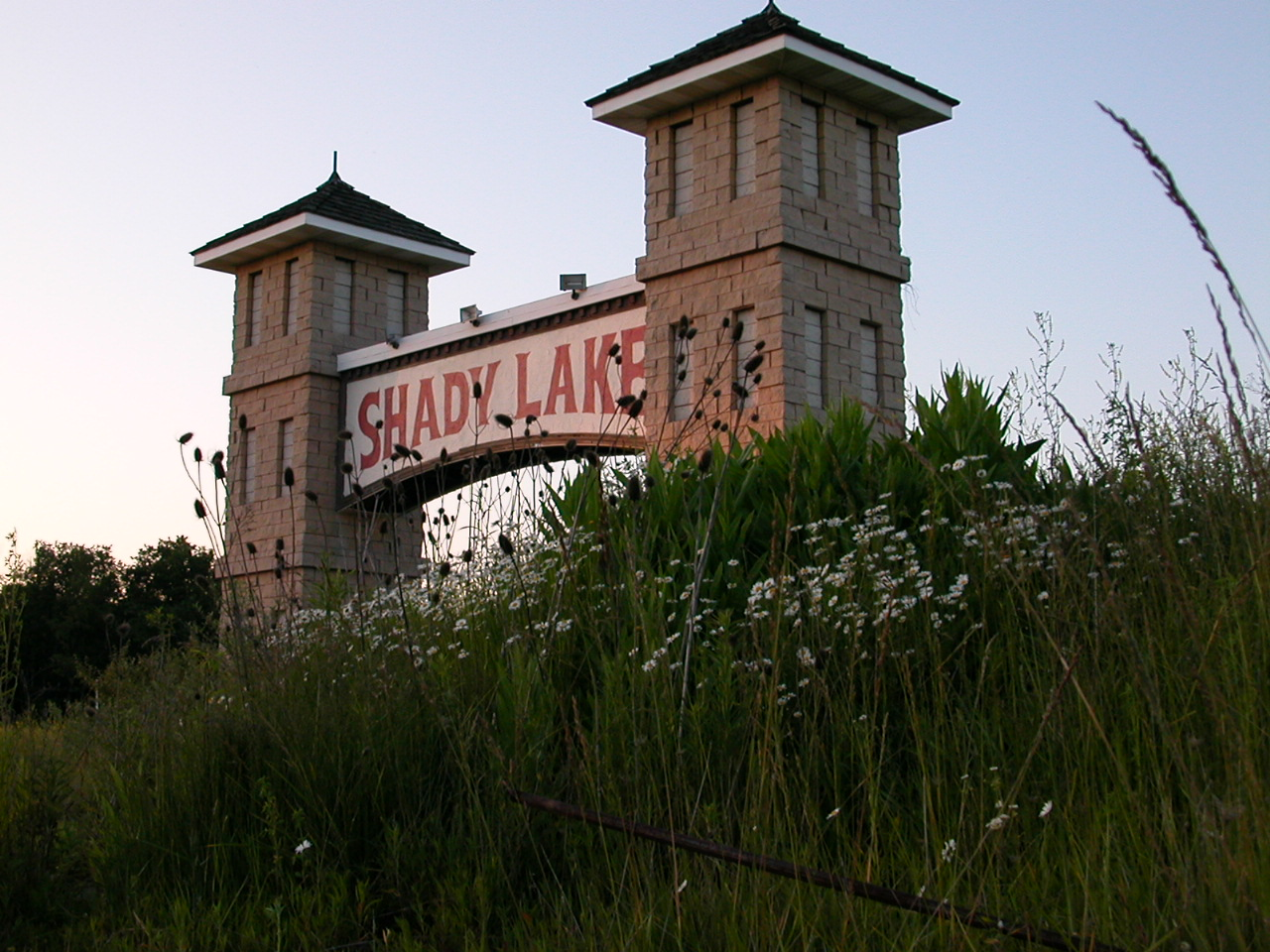
- The former amusement park's entrance in 2003
- Interactive map of Shady Lake Park
- Location: Streetsboro, Ohio, USA
- Coordinates: 41.247222°N 81.358333°W
- Status: Defunct
- Opened: 1978
- Closed: 1982

Shady Lake Park was a small amusement park operated by the Humphrey Family in Streetsboro, Ohio. The park opened in 1978 and closed in 1982. Most of the rides at Shady Lake Park were relocated from Euclid Beach Park. Many of the rides from Shady Lake Park ended up at Old Indiana Fun Park, including the Euclid Beach Chief. The tall gate structure, resembling the one at Euclid Beach Park, remained standing until 2004. Today, the land along Route 14 is home to Shady Lake Apartments and a Raising Cane’s.
