= Lake Creek (Moose Creek tributary) =

- Location of mouth

Location
- Country: United States
- State: Alaska

Physical characteristics
- Source: Wonder Lake
- Mouth: Moose Creek
  - location: United States
  - coordinates: 63°30′58″N 150°54′31″W
  - elevation: 1,762 ft (537 m)
- Length: 2 mi (3.2 km)

Lake Creek drains Wonder Lake and flows north-northwest 2 miles (3.2 km) before flowing into Moose Creek in central Alaska.
