= Lamine, Missouri =

Unincorporated community in Cooper County, Missouri, United States

Lamine
- Unincorporated community
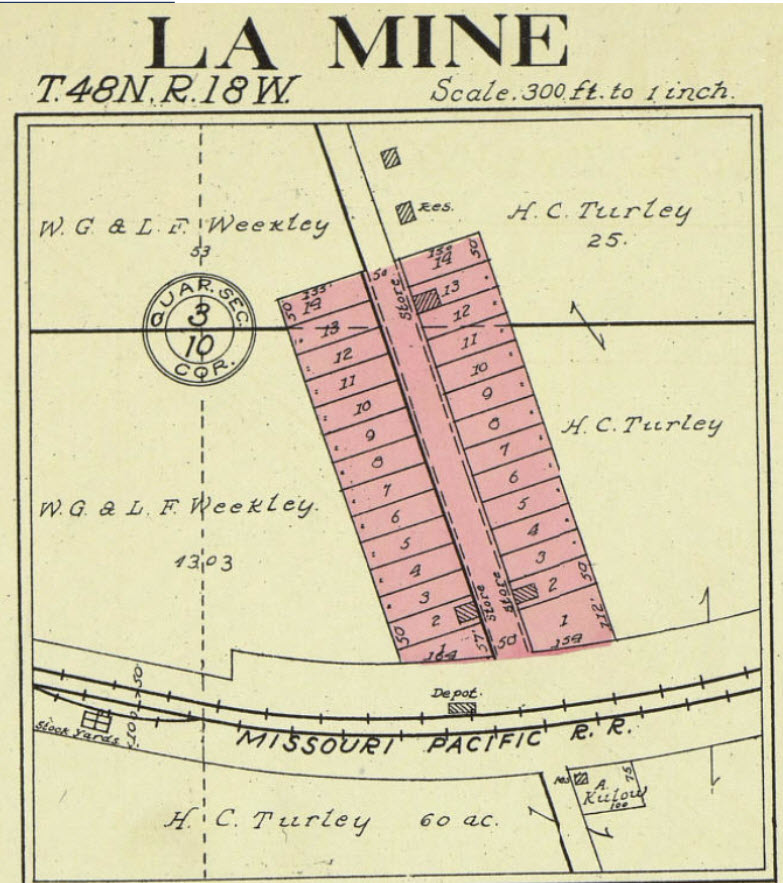
- 1915 map of Lamine

- Location in Missouri
- Coordinates: 38°56′48″N 92°52′29″W
- Country: United States
- State: Missouri
- County: Cooper
- Township: Lamine
- Named for: Lamine River
- Elevation: 614 ft (187 m)
- USGS Feature ID: 720776
- Census Code: 40484
- Class Code: U6

Lamine or La Mine is an unincorporated community in Lamine Township, Cooper County, Missouri, United States.

== History ==
Lamine was laid out in 1888, from land dedicated by John A. Fray, Martha E. Fray, Columbus Higgerson and Mary F. Higgerson.

Lamine takes its name from the nearby Lamine River. The river was named by Philippe de La Renaudière "Rivière a la Mine" in 1723. In 1720, Philippe de La Renaudière had been sent by Philippe de Renault, the Director of Mines of the French colonies in America to find gold and silver west of the Mississippi River. He found lead in La Mine, but no silver or gold.

Lamine is the only town ("unincorporated community") in the greater Lamine Township.

A post office called La Mine was established in 1838, and remained in operation until 1924 when "La Mine" became "Lamine".

In about 1843, the Church of Christ was organized in Lamine but it disbanded after a few years due to deaths and removals and was reconstituted on August 7, 1865 by Elder P. Donan.

Sam Walton opened a "business house" in Lamine in 1869. Sam Walton's grandson Sam Walton would go on to establish Walmart.

Brothers-in-law John T. Redd and Thomas B. Gibson opened a general store in Lamine in 1871. The store's safe was blown open in 1881 by robbers who stole $700.

Mellor Village and Mounds Archeological District, one of the known Hopewell Indian settlements located at the confluence of the Lamine and Missouri rivers in the Lamine township, was listed on the National Register of Historic Places in 1969 with a boundary increase in 1974.
