= Lake County =

Lake County may refer to:

== New Zealand ==
- Lake County, New Zealand

== United States ==
- Lake County, California
- Lake County, Colorado
- Lake County, Florida
- Lake County, Illinois
- Lake County, Indiana
- Lake County, Michigan
- Lake County, Minnesota
- Lake County, Montana
- Lake County, Ohio
- Lake County, Oregon
- Lake County, South Dakota
- Lake County, Tennessee

== See also ==
- Lake (disambiguation)
- Lake and Peninsula Borough, Alaska
- Lake Township (disambiguation)
- Lake of the Woods County, Minnesota
- Bear Lake County, Idaho
- Oceana County, Michigan
- Green Lake County, Wisconsin
- Red Lake County, Minnesota
- Salt Lake County, Utah
