= Justice Lake =

Justice Lake may refer to:

- George B. Lake (1827–1910), associate justice of the Nebraska Supreme Court
- I. Beverly Lake Jr. (1934–2019), chief justice of the North Carolina Supreme Court
- I. Beverly Lake Sr. (1906–1996), associate justice of the North Carolina Supreme Court
- Justice Lake (Ontario), a lake in Ontario
