= Bearpaw River =

Location
- Country: United States
- State: Alaska

Physical characteristics
- Mouth: Kantishna River
  - location: 47 miles SE of Britzshtini Mountains, United States
  - coordinates: 64°05′30″N 150°34′02″W
  - elevation: 443 ft (135 m)

Basin features
- Tributaries
  - left: Moose Creek

The Bearpaw River is a 55-mile (89 km) tributary of the Kantishna River in central Alaska in the United States. Variant names include Ch'edraya' No', Ch'edzaaye' No', Ch'edzaaye' No', Hutl'ot, and Ch'idraya' No'. A small brewing company is named after the river.
