= Raub Lake Park =

Lake in Malaysia

Raub Lake Park (Malay: Taman Tasik Raub) is a lake park in Raub District in Pahang, Malaysia. People can relax around the lake area and also rent boats to go sightseeing around the lake.
