= Lake, Oklahoma =

Lake
- Unincorporated community
- Location within the state of Oklahoma Lake (the United States)
- Coordinates: 36°8′24″N 96°4′54″W
- Country: United States
- State: Oklahoma
- County: Tulsa
- Time zone: UTC-6 (Central (CST))
  - Summer (DST): UTC-5 (CDT)

Lake is an unincorporated community in Tulsa County, Oklahoma, United States. It is located at latitude 36°8'24" North, longitude 96°4'54" West. Lake is made up of two blocks of residential areas and one small store and has a population of approximately 50.
