= Lakes (restaurant) =

Coordinates: 52°13′15.75″N 5°8′29.95″E

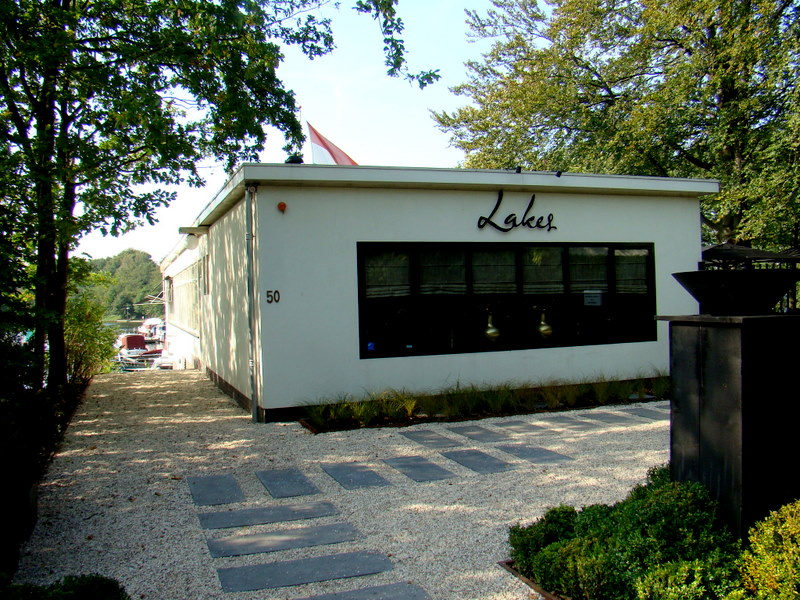
- Interactive map of Lakes

Restaurant information
- Established: 5 September 2007
- Head chef: Erik de Boer
- Food type: International
- Rating: Michelin Guide
- Location: Vreelandseweg 50, Hilversum, 1216 CH, Netherlands
- Seating capacity: 55
- Website: Official website

Lakes is a defunct restaurant in Hilversum, Netherlands. It was a fine dining restaurant that was awarded one Michelin star in 2009 and retained that rating until 2014.

In 2013, GaultMillau awarded the restaurant 14 out of 20 points.

Head chef of Lakes was Erik de Boer, who opened the restaurant 5 September 2007. On 12 November, it was reported that head chef Erik de Boer had left the restaurant by 1 November 2013 due to a change of course. On 27 November 2013, the restaurant was declared bankrupt. The restaurant remained open, due to the restaurant being moved into a new limited company with the same owner.

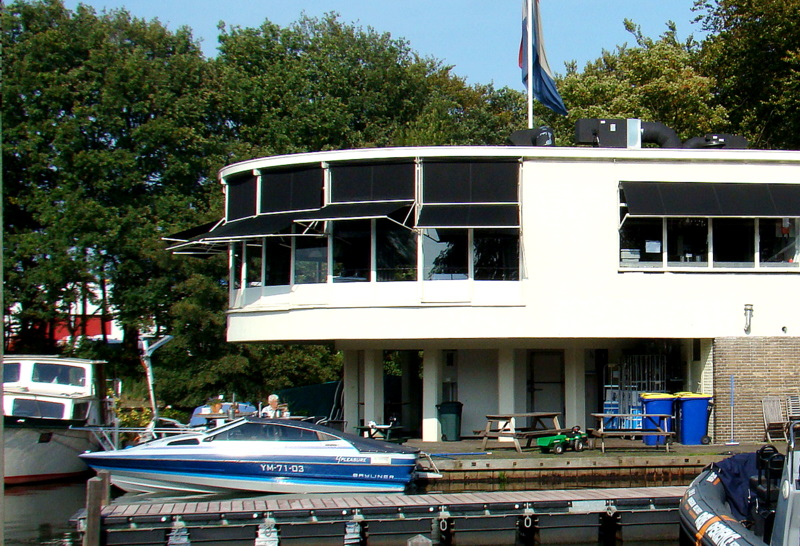
"Paviljoen Wildschut", built by Willem Marinus Dudok, now houses the restaurant

The restaurant is located in the former "Paviljoen Wildschut", once the hospitality building of the adjacent marina. The whole complex, comprising a boathouse, hospitality unit, 2 staff residences and a terrace, was built in 1936–1938 to designs made by the well-known architect Willem Marinus Dudok. All parts of this complex are now Rijksmonument.

== See also ==
- List of Michelin starred restaurants in the Netherlands
