= The Lake (EP) =

EP by Antony and the Johnsons
- Released: November 2, 2004
- Genre: Baroque pop
- Length: 14:54
- Label: Secretly Canadian; SC113
- Producer: Anohni Hegarty

Antony and the Johnsons chronology
Hope There's Someone (2004)	The Lake (2004)	I Am a Bird Now (2005)

Professional ratings
Review scores
Source	Rating
AllMusic	3.5/5 stars
Pitchfork	7.5/10

The Lake is a three-track EP by Antony and the Johnsons, released in 2004 on Secretly Canadian.

== Track listing ==
1. "The Lake" - 5:23 (written by Anohni & Edgar Allan Poe)
2. "Fistful of Love" - 5:52 (written by Anohni & Lou Reed)
3. "The Horror Has Gone" - 3:38 (written by Anohni)
