= Lake, Marinette County, Wisconsin =

Lake, Wisconsin
- Town
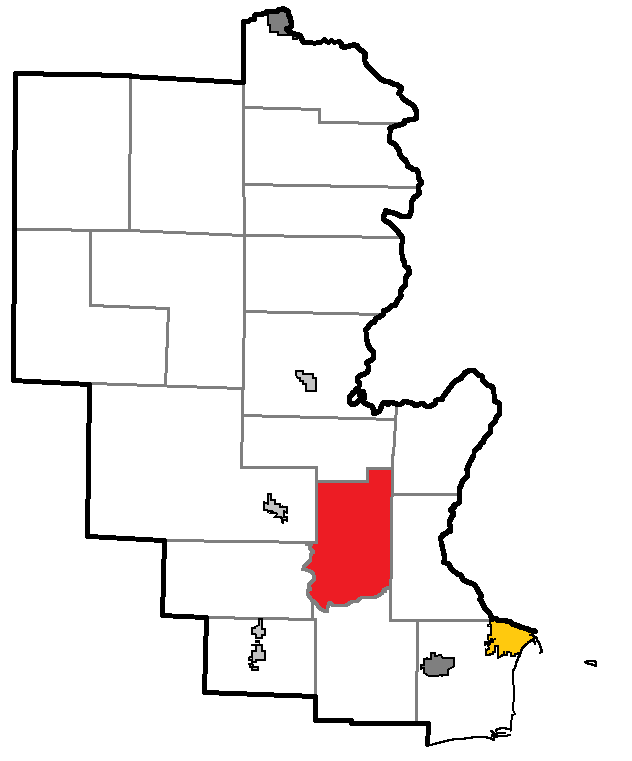
- Location of Lake, within Marinette County
- Coordinates: 45°12′3″N 87°53′13″W
- Country: United States
- State: Wisconsin
- County: Marinette

Area
  - Total: 59.5 sq mi (154.2 km^{2})
  - Land: 55.8 sq mi (144.4 km^{2})
  - Water: 3.8 sq mi (9.8 km^{2})
- Elevation: 699 ft (213 m)

Population (2020)
  - Total: 1,186
  - Density: 21.27/sq mi (8.213/km^{2})
- Time zone: UTC-6 (Central (CST))
  - Summer (DST): UTC-5 (CDT)
- FIPS code: 55-41075
- GNIS feature ID: 1583508
- Website: https://www.townoflakewi.com/

Lake is a town in Marinette County, Wisconsin, United States. As of the 2020 census, the town population was 1,186. The unincorporated community of Loomis is located in the town,

== Geography ==
According to the United States Census Bureau, the town has a total area of 59.5 square miles (154.2 km^{2}), of which 55.8 square miles (144.4 km^{2}) is land and 3.8 square miles (9.8 km^{2}) (6.35%) is water.

== Demographics ==
As of the census of 2000, there were 1,064 people, 418 households, and 318 families residing in the town. The population density was 19.1 inhabitants per square mile (7.4/km^{2}). There were 524 housing units at an average density of 9.4 per square mile (3.6/km^{2}). The racial makeup of the town was 97.65% White, 0.19% African American, 0.56% Native American, 0.09% Asian, 0.38% from other races, and 1.13% from two or more races. Hispanic or Latino of any race were 0.66% of the population.

There were 418 households, out of which 28.7% had children under the age of 18 living with them, 66.7% were married couples living together, 5.5% had a female householder with no husband present, and 23.7% were non-families. 20.1% of all households were made up of individuals, and 8.6% had someone living alone who was 65 years of age or older. The average household size was 2.55 and the average family size was 2.93.

In the town, the population was spread out, with 23.3% under the age of 18, 6.3% from 18 to 24, 27.5% from 25 to 44, 28.0% from 45 to 64, and 14.8% who were 65 years of age or older. The median age was 42 years. For every 100 females, there were 106.2 males. For every 100 females age 18 and over, there were 106.6 males.

The median income for a household in the town was $39,432, and the median income for a family was $44,615. Males had a median income of $35,795 versus $24,844 for females. The per capita income for the town was $17,518. About 6.3% of families and 8.4% of the population were below the poverty line, including 16.8% of those under age 18 and 6.3% of those age 65 or over.
