= The Lakes Mental Health Hospital =

Mental hospital in Essex, England

The Lakes Mental Health Hospital is a mental health hospital on Turner Road, in the city of Colchester, England. The hospital has two in-patient wards, Gosfield Ward (an all-male ward) and Ardleigh Ward (an all-female ward). It is run by Essex Partnership University NHS Foundation Trust (EPUT).

== Performance ==
A 2016 report by the Care Quality Commission found that the hospital overall "requires improvement" with the safety of the hospital being described as "inadequate" while the care was described as "good".

== Controversies ==
=== Sexual assault ===
In 2018, a woman known by courts as "Jess" reported that a male health care assistant had kissed and massaged her without her consent. The Essex Partnership University NHS Foundation Trust paid her £33,000 in compensation.

=== Patient deaths ===
The hospital has faced criticism over a number of patient deaths that have occurred on and outside of the hospital. These include Michelle Morton, a 29 year old woman diagnosed with emotionally unstable personality disorder who committed suicide on 8 December 2018, Fred Peck, aged 54 who committed suicide in 2004. Joshua Leader, aged 35, diagnosed with psychosis and schizophrenia committed suicide two days after being denied treatment at The Lakes.

=== Hospital conditions ===
The conditions of the hospital have been criticised for being "unsafe" and patients have claimed to be forced to sleep on the floor and have claimed the hospital treat them like "inmates".
