= Wonder Lake (Alaska) =

Lake in Alaska, United States

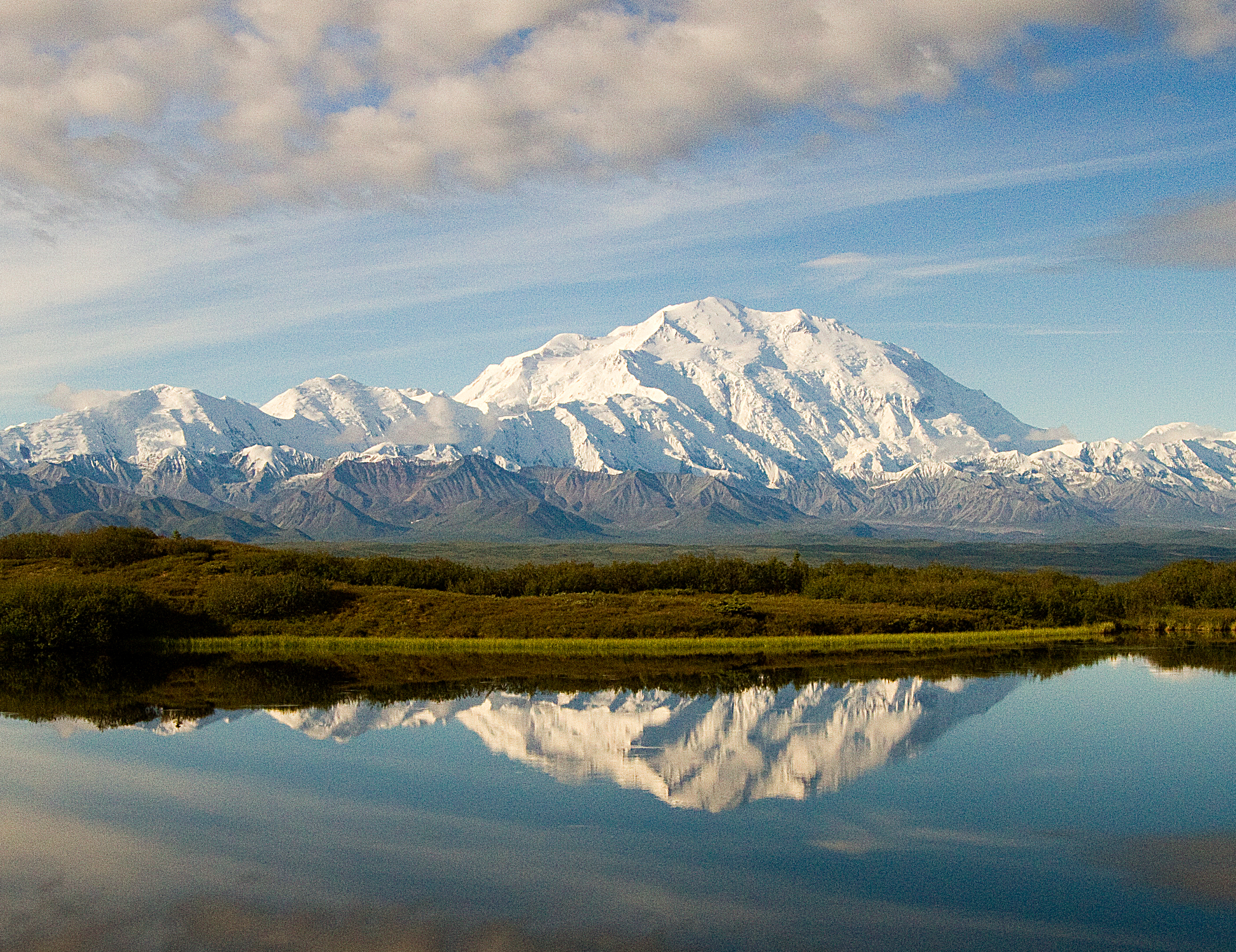
- Wonder Lake with Denali (federally Mount McKinley) in the background

- Location of Wonder Lake within Alaska
- Location: Denali Borough, Alaska, United States
- Coordinates: 63°28′34″N 150°52′37″W
- Type: Lake
- Primary outflows: Lake Creek
- Basin countries: United States
- Surface elevation: 2,001 feet (610 m)

Wonder Lake is a lake located in Denali National Park and Preserve in Alaska.

Wonder Lake is 2.6 miles (4.2 km) long and 280 feet (85 m) deep.

The lake was excavated by the Muldrow Glacier approximately 14,000 years ago. The inflow and outflow channels of Wonder Lake are located side-by-side at the northern end of the lake.

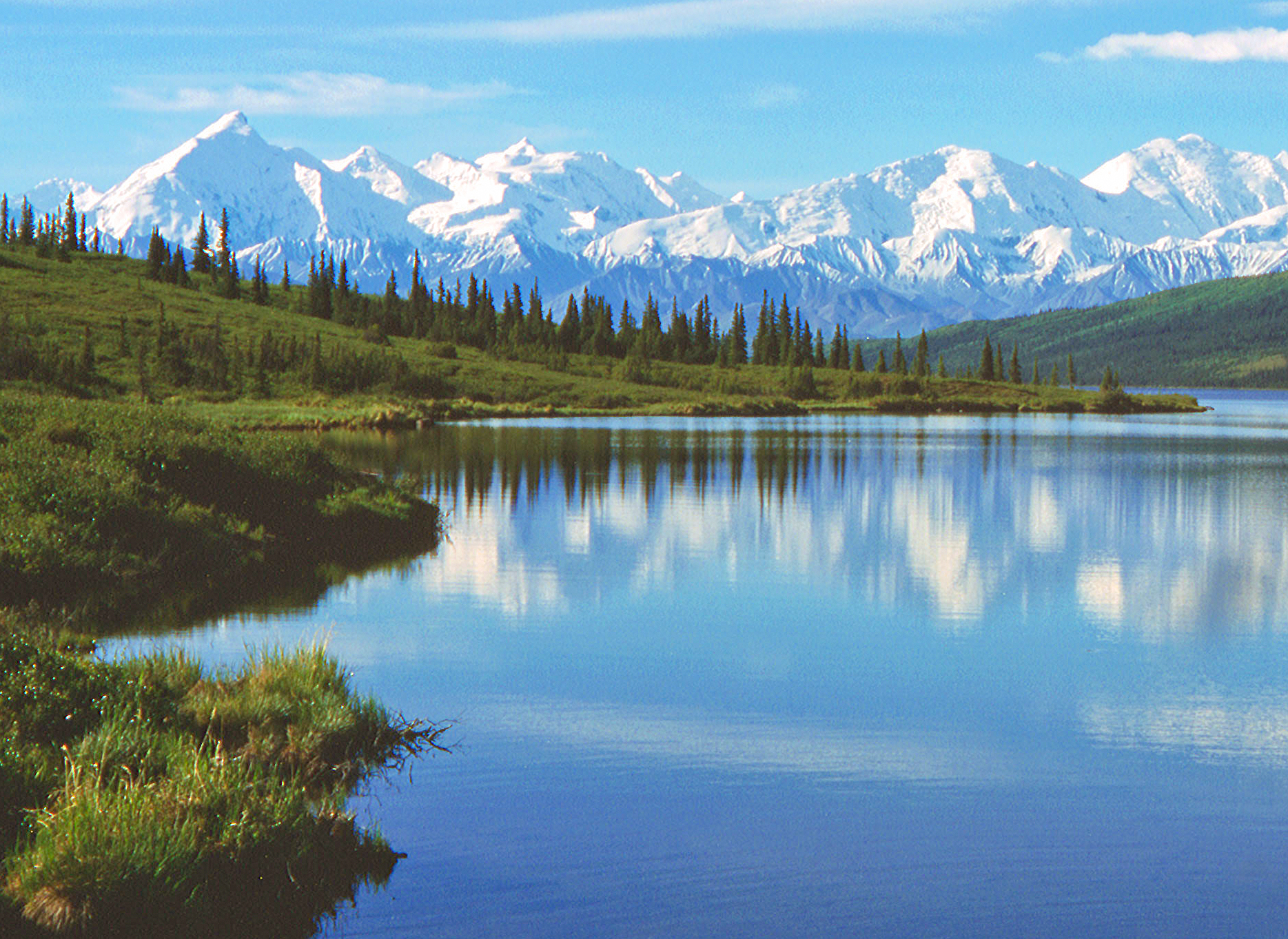
Wonder Lake
