= Land o' Lakes =

Land of Lakes or the Land o' Lakes may refer to:

== Associated with Minnesota ==
- a nickname for the U.S. state of Minnesota
- Land O'Lakes, a Minnesota-based national agricultural cooperative known for butter
- Land O'Lakes, a brand of vegetables sold by Oconomowoc Canning Company that owned the original Land O'Lakes trademark
- Land o' Lakes State Forest, a state forest in Minnesota

== Elsewhere ==
- Land O' Lakes, Florida, a census-designated area
  - Land O' Lakes High School in the U.S. state of Florida
- Land o' Lakes, Wisconsin, a town
  - Land O'Lakes Statement, a 1967 document published in the town
- Land o' Lakes (community), Wisconsin, an unincorporated jurisdiction

== See also ==
- Lake District (disambiguation)
- The Land of 10,000 Lakes
