= Lake Creek (Charrette Creek tributary) =

Stream in the US state of Missouri

Coordinates: 38.5975514°N 91.0056984°W

Lake Creek is a stream in St. Charles and Warren County in the U.S. state of Missouri. It is a tributary of Charrette Creek.

Lake Creek was named for pools of water near its course when the stream is at flood stage.

== See also ==
- List of rivers of Missouri
