= The Lakes South Morang College =

Coordinates: 37.6346°S 145.0767°E

- The Lakes South Morang College
- South Morang, Victoria; Australia

Information
- Type: Government school
- Motto: "Aspire to inspire."
- Established: 2007
- Principal: Bill Panas
- Year levels: Prep - Year 6 (Primary) Years 7 - 12 (Secondary)
- Enrollment: 688
- Houses: Bial (Red), Biik (Green), Yayal (Blue), Ngawan (Yellow)
- Colours: Lime, Navy blue and white
- Website: The Lakes Website

The Lakes South Morang College, formerly The Lakes South Morang P–9 School, and also known as The Lakes, is a school situated in the northern suburbs of Melbourne, Australia, within the City of Whittlesea local government area.

== History ==
The school was previously called The Lakes South Morang P-9 School.

As of June 2023 the principal is Bill Panas.

In March of 2025, the House names were changed to better connect with Aboriginal culture, specifically the Wurundjeri people of the Kulin Nation.

== Campuses ==
=== Primary campus ===
This site has an administration area, general purpose classrooms that open onto flexible learning spaces, an art room, and a library. Students are required to bring an iPads to each class.

As of February 2026, Years 5-6 are transitioning from iPads to Notebooks for more effective learning, and to prepare them for secondary campus.

=== Secondary campus ===
This site includes an administration area with a professional development resource centre, 20 general purpose classroom spaces opening onto flexible, common learning areas, an arts precinct, a gymnasium, performing arts spaces, food technology and a canteen. The research and development precinct houses purpose-built science labs, a design studio, dance studio and state-of-the-art technology facilities. Students are required to bring a laptop computer and a learning folio for use in classes.

== Performing arts ==
=== The Lake ===
The Lake: a feathered tale of deception and dance was The Lakes' second major stage production, staged in September 2010. Based on the story of Swan Lake. contemporary music and dances were performed in The Lake. Five of the seven songs in the musical are original compositions written by one of the music staff, which were played by a live band on the nights. The other two songs were 'Bleeding Love' by Leona Lewis and 'Tainted Love' by The Pussycat Dolls.

Track listing

1. "The Lake Overture" (Opening Scene)
2. "Woods" (Woods Scene)
3. "Tainted Love" by The Pussycat Dolls (Swan Scene)
4. "Fire Love" (Love Scene)
5. "Fight" (Fight Scene)
6. "A Girl Like You" (Party Scene)
7. "Bleeding Love" by Leona Lewis
8. "Life Begins" (Death/Closing Scene)

The production was held at Parade College in Bundoora.

=== Unskooled ===
Unskooled was a band composed of middle-years students who attended The Lakes P-9 School. The band started in 2008 and released two EPs. It performed at many events, including the NMR School Of Rock in 2008 and 2009, Doreen Primary School's Big Day Out concert, and The City of Whittlesea Community Festival in 2008

The band was suspended in March 2010 and permanently separated soon afterwards.

==== Discography ====
Album Info
Anymore
- Release Date: 19 November 2008
- Cover Design: Zachary Bowen
My Heart Is Breaking (feat. The Superstylers)
- Release Date: 18 November 2009
- Cover Design: Nicholas Darling-Filby
