= Flat Creek (Lamine River tributary) =

Stream in the US state of Missouri

Flat Creek is a stream in Benton, Morgan and Pettis counties in the U.S. state of Missouri. It is a tributary of the Lamine River.

The stream headwaters arise in northern Benton County west of Ionia at 38°29′25″N 93°22′43″W and the stream flows northwest past Brandon Siding into Pettis County east of Windsor and then turns to the northeast passing under Missouri Route 52 south of Sedalia. The stream meanders to the east passing south of Smithton into Morgan County and under Missouri Route 135 to its confluence with Richland Creek to form the Lamine River at 38°40′07″N 92°57′11″W.

Flat Creek most likely derives its name from a corruption of the French word plat, meaning "shallow".

== See also ==
- List of rivers of Missouri
