= Blackwater River (Missouri) =

River in Missouri, United States

Physical characteristics
- Source
  - location: Confluence of the North and South Forks of the Blackwater River, Johnson County, Missouri
  - coordinates: 38°48′23″N 93°50′46″W
  - elevation: 700 ft (210 m)
- Mouth
  - location: Confluence with the Lamine River in Cooper County, Missouri
  - coordinates: 38°56′21″N 92°56′50″W
  - elevation: 577 ft (176 m)
- Length: 79 mi (127 km)
- Discharge
  - location: Blue Lick, Missouri
  - average: 824 cu/ft. per sec.

Basin features
- Progression: Blackwater River → Lamine → Missouri → Mississippi → Gulf of Mexico
- GNIS ID: 729709

The Blackwater River is a 79.3-mile-long (127.6 km) tributary of the Lamine River in west-central Missouri in the United States. Via the Lamine and Missouri rivers, it is part of the watershed of the Mississippi River. The Blackwater River was named from the character of its banks and water.

== Course ==
The Blackwater River is formed by the confluence of the North Fork Blackwater River and the South Fork Blackwater River in Johnson County approximately 6 miles (10 km) northwest of Warrensburg. The river flows generally east-northeastwardly through Johnson, Pettis, Saline and Cooper counties, past the towns of Sweet Springs and Blackwater. It flows into the Lamine River in northwestern Cooper County, approximately 4 miles (6.4 km) southeast of Blackwater.

The North Fork of the Blackwater starts at 38°55′01″N 94°03′27″W and the South fork starts at 38°54′55″N 94°03′40″W (about 1000 feet apart) both an elevation of approximately 1050 feet. The North Fork source is in the southwestern corner of Lafayette County near the small village of Chapel Hill and the South fork source is just to the southwest across the county line in the northwest corner of Johnson County.

Several sections of the river's upper course have been straightened and channelized.

== See also ==
- List of Missouri rivers
