= Lamine River =

River in Cooper, Pettis, and Morgan counties in Missouri, United States

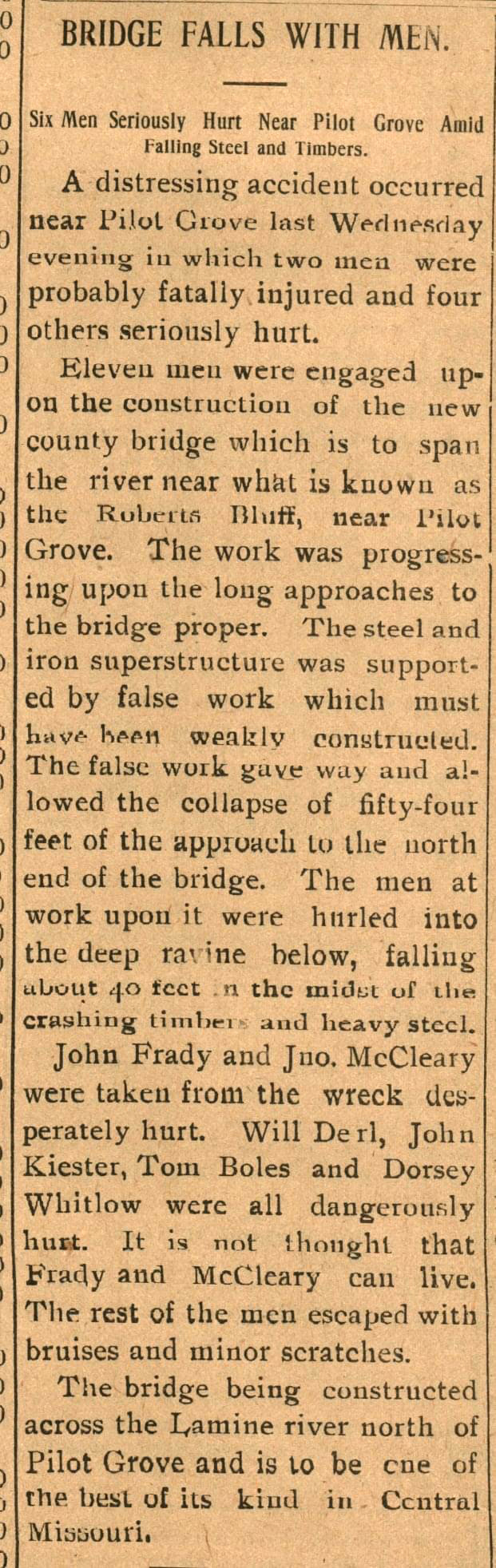
Newsclipping from the Bunceton Eagle describes a 1905 construction accident on the Roberts Bluff Bridge over the Lamine River in Buffalo Prairie north of Pilot Grove.

The Lamine River (/ləˈmiːn/ lə-MEEN or /ləˈmaɪn/ lə-MYNE) is a 63.8-mile-long (102.7 km) tributary of the Missouri River in central Missouri in the United States. It is formed in northern Morgan County, about 4 miles (6 km) southeast of Otterville by the confluence of Flat and Richland creeks, and flows generally northwardly through Cooper and Pettis counties. In northwestern Cooper County the Lamine collects the Blackwater River and flows into the Missouri River northeast of Lamine and 6 miles (10 km) west of Boonville. At Clifton City, the river has a mean annual discharge of 455 cubic feet per second. Below the mouth of the Blackwater River, its discharge averages 1,279 cubic feet per second (see Blackwater River.)

The river was named by French explorers for mining operations in the area. According to the Geographic Names Information System, the river has also been known as "La Mine River" and as "Rivière a la Mine." The unincorporated community of Lamine and the township of Lamine were named after the La Mine River.

== Location ==
Mouth
Confluence with the Missouri River, Cooper County, Missouri: 38°58′47″N 92°51′05″W
Source
Confluence of Flat Creek and Richland Creek, Morgan County, Missouri: 38°40′07″N 92°57′11″W

== See also ==
- List of Missouri rivers
