= Rivers Lake =

Lake in the state of California, United States

- Location in Los Angeles County Location in California
- Location: East Lake Park Avenue, Hollywood Park, Inglewood, California
- Coordinates: 33.9503°N 118.3391°W
- Type: Artificial lake

Rivers Lake is the colloquial name of the man-made lake in Lake Park, located in Inglewood, California, United States. It is part of the Hollywood Park entertainment complex which includes SoFi Stadium. The lake is located just south of the stadium itself.

== Purpose ==
Rivers Lake was designed to be used for rainwater harvesting. At 15 feet deep and holding close to 11 million gallons of water, the 6-acre lake captures 70-80% of the rainwater in the entire complex. This reclaimed water amounts to 26 million gallons annually used to water the entirety of the greenery throughout the stadium park and its surrounding streetscapes. In addition to its use in sustainable water usage, Rivers Lake also features multiple waterfalls and is designed to be an aesthetic addition to the plaza it borders.

== Naming ==
Though the lake originally did not have an official name, members of the Los Angeles Chargers subreddit started a grassroots movement to name the lake, Rivers Lake, in honor of long-time Chargers Quarterback Philip Rivers. Since the original post on August 21, 2021, the Rivers Lake name has been used in media and recognized by Google Maps to identify the man-made lake.

== Incidents ==
On July 6, 2022, a man's body was found in Rivers Lake after the man had wandered into the center of the lake. The body was recovered by the Los Angeles Police Department dive team, assisting Inglewood Police Department.

Similarly, on February 2, 2024 during an Illenium concert, a 19-year-old man drowned in Rivers Lake.
