= SoFi Stadium =

Stadium in Inglewood, California

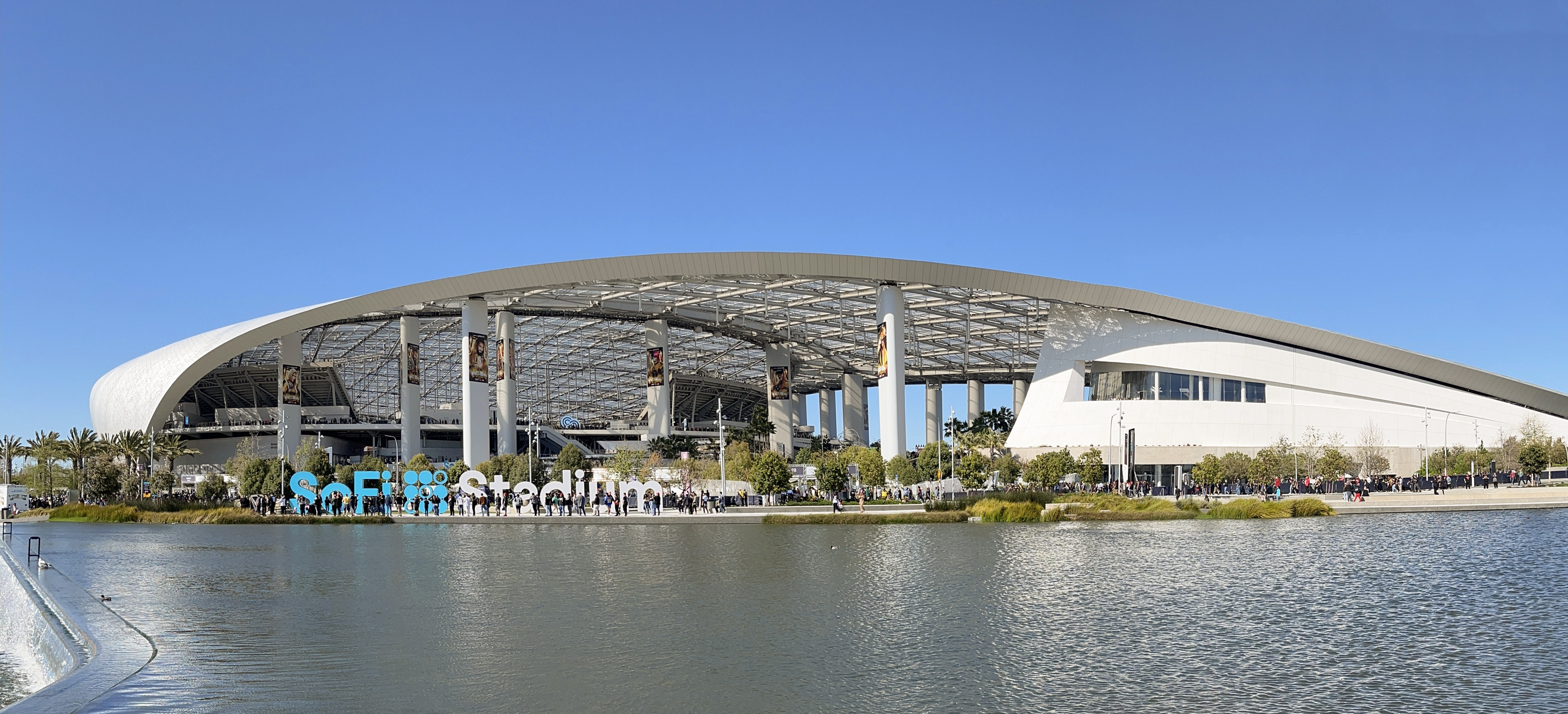
- SoFi Stadium in 2023

- Location in the Greater Los Angeles area Location in California Location in the United States Location in North America
- Interactive map of SoFi Stadium
- Former names: City of Champions Stadium (planning phase); Los Angeles Stadium at Hollywood Park (planning/construction phase); Los Angeles Stadium (2026 FIFA World Cup)
- Address: 1001 South Stadium Drive
- Location: Inglewood, California, U.S.
- Coordinates: 33.953°N 118.339°W
- Owner: StadCo LA (Note: Kroenke Sports & Entertainment subsidiary); Hollywood Park Land Company (Note: Joint venture of The Flesher Group and Stockbridge Capital Group)
- Operator: StadCo LA
- Capacity: 70,240 (expandable to over 100,240 for major events)
- Executive suites: 260
- Roof: Skylight
- Surface: Artificial turf
- Record attendance: 161,892 (WrestleMania 39, April 1-2, 2023)
- Acreage: 298 acres (121 ha)
- Public transit: Culver City Bus: 99 SoFi Xpress; GTrans: 7X; Metro: 115, 117, 212, 215; SoFi Stadium Express; Torrance Transit: 10

Construction
- Groundbreaking: November 17, 2016; 10 years ago
- Built: 2016–2020
- Opened: September 8, 2020; 6 years ago
- Cost: $5–6 billion (estimated)($6.22 billion–7.46 billion in 2025 dollars)
- Architect: HKS
- Project manager: Legends Global Planning
- Structural engineer: Walter P Moore Engineers and Consultants
- Services engineers: Henderson Engineers, Inc.
- General contractor: Turner/AECOM HuntJV

Tenants
- Los Angeles Rams (NFL) (2020–present); Los Angeles Chargers (NFL) (2020–present); LA Bowl (NCAA) (2021–2025)

Website
- sofistadium.com

SoFi Stadium (/ˈsoʊfaɪ/ SOH-fy) is a multi-purpose indoor stadium in Inglewood, California, United States, a suburb of Los Angeles. SoFi occupies the former site of the Hollywood Park Racetrack and neighbors the Kia Forum and Intuit Dome.

Opened in September 2020, the stadium has a capacity of 70,240, expandable to over 100,000 for major events, and a translucent roof made of ETFE panels allowing for sunlight and climate control. It serves as the home to the National Football League (NFL)'s Los Angeles Rams and Los Angeles Chargers. The stadium hosted Super Bowl LVI in 2022, the 2023 College Football Playoff National Championship, WrestleMania 39 in 2023, the 2023 CONCACAF Gold Cup final, and the LA Bowl from 2021 to 2025. It hosted eight matches during the 2026 FIFA World Cup, including the United States opening match against Paraguay. It will host Super Bowl LXI in 2027, and the opening ceremony and swimming events for the 2028 Summer Olympics.

SoFi Stadium is one of two stadiums currently shared by a pair of NFL teams, the other being MetLife Stadium shared by the New York Giants and New York Jets. It is the first stadium complex outside of the New York metropolitan area to host two NFL teams concurrently. The stadium lies within the Hollywood Park complex, a mixed-use neighborhood on the site of the former racetrack. Hollywood Park Casino re-opened in a new building on the property in October 2016, becoming the development's first establishment to open.

== Design ==
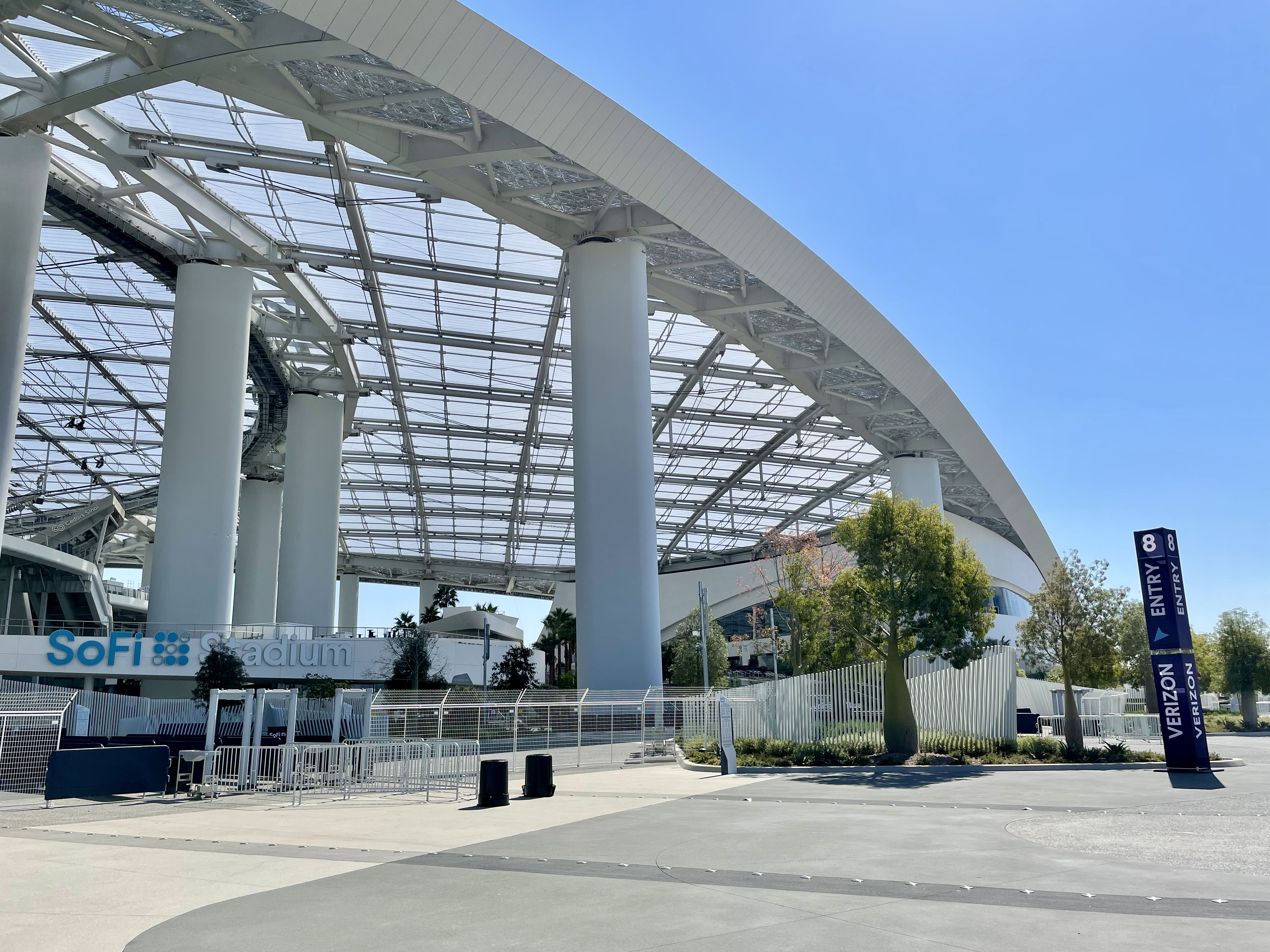
Southwest entrance into American Airlines Plaza between the stadium and the YouTube Theater

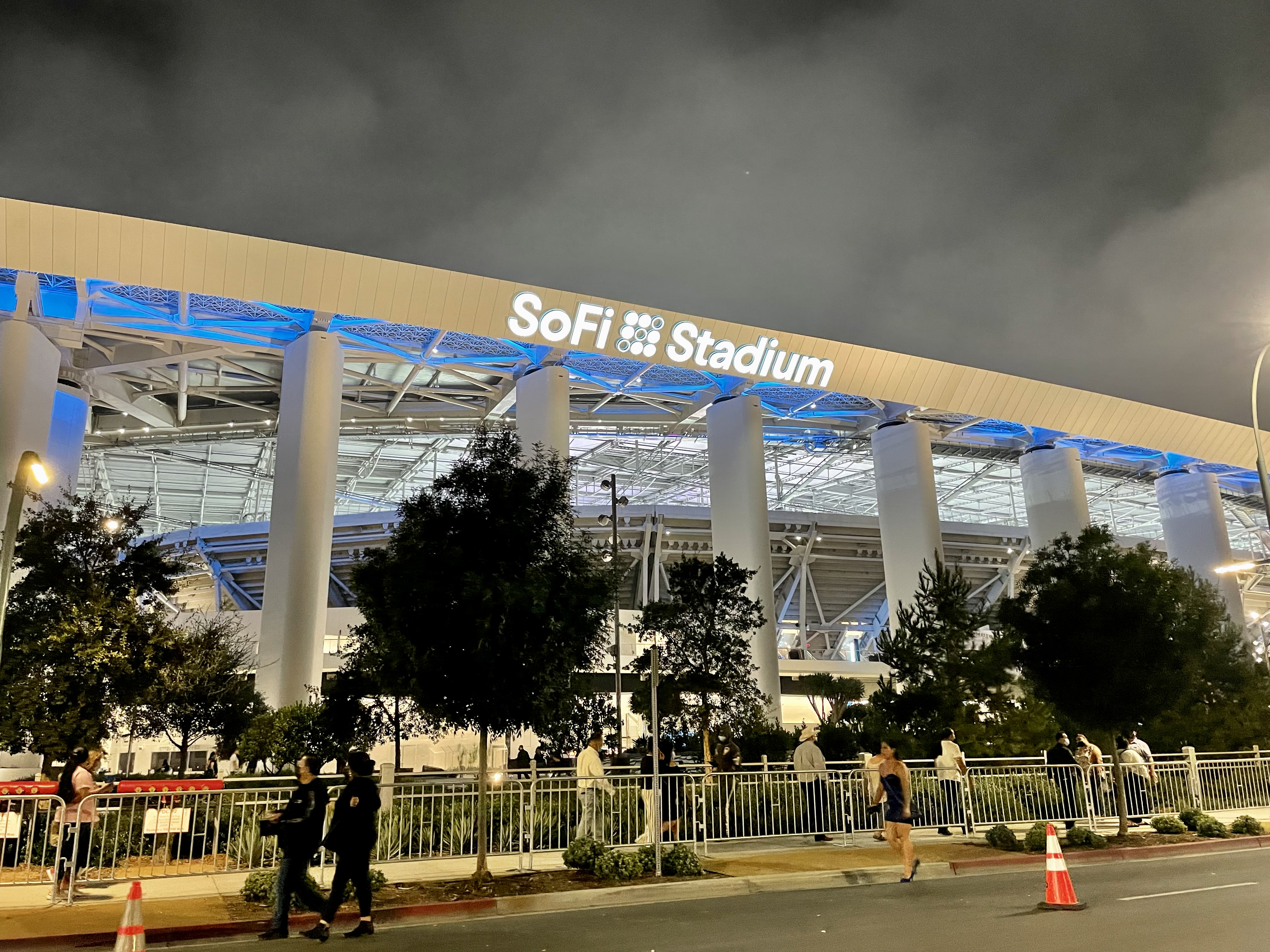
East entrance

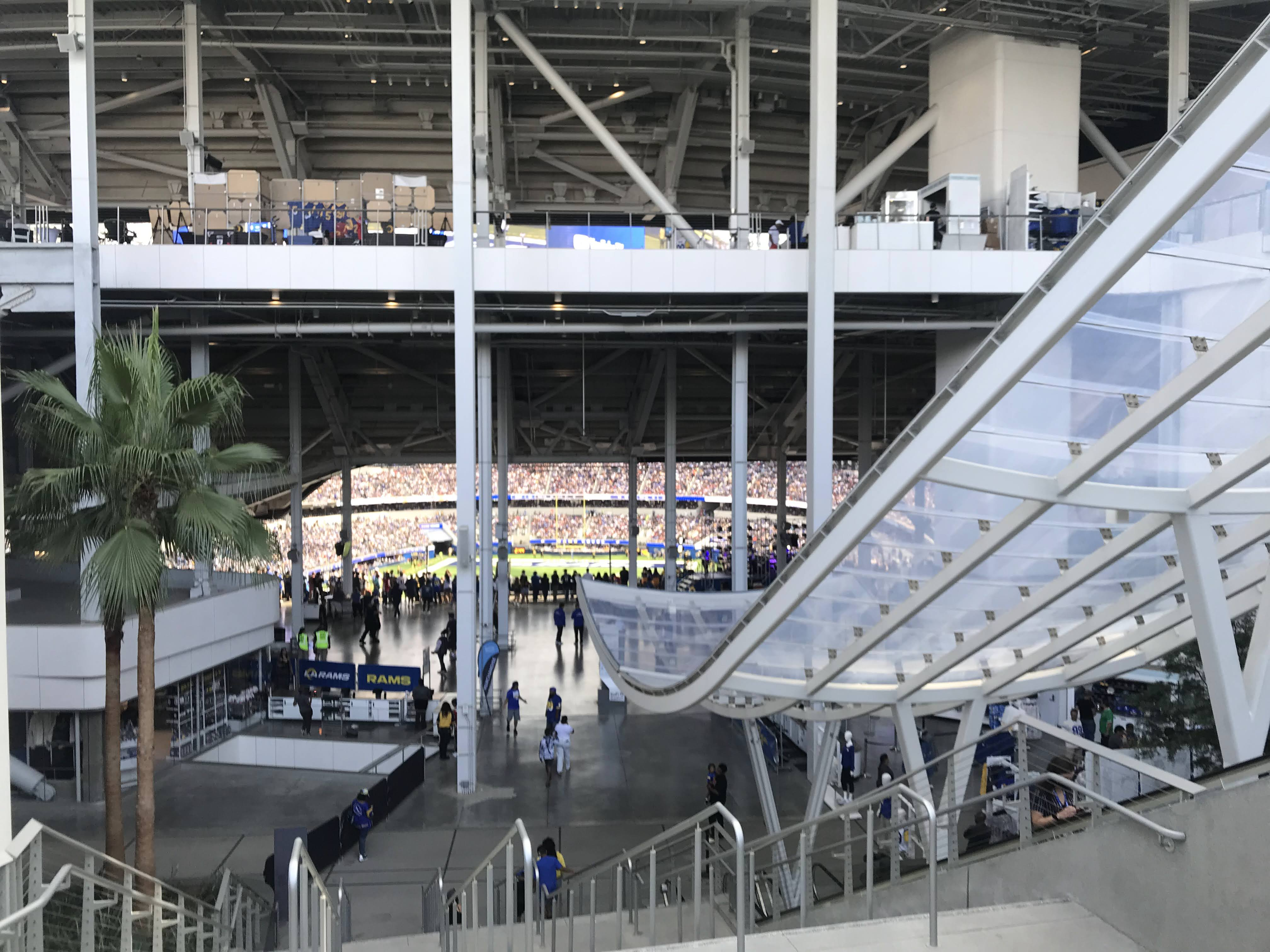
The escalators at SoFi Stadium; September 18, 2022

SoFi Stadium was designed by HKS and consists of the stadium itself, a pedestrian plaza, and a performance venue. Above the stadium is an independently supported translucent canopy which covers the stadium proper, the adjacent pedestrian plaza, and the attached performance venue. The million-square-foot canopy is made up of 302 ETFE panels, 46 of which can be opened to provide ventilation, supported by a cable net. The canopy has 27,000 embedded LED pucks, which can display images and video that can also be seen from airplanes flying into Los Angeles International Airport. The stadium bowl has open sides and seats 70,240 spectators for most events, with the ability to expand by 30,000 seats for larger events. Despite the roof, the open sides of the stadium still make it vulnerable to lightning delays, with the first such delay in an NFL game between the Chargers and the Las Vegas Raiders on October 4, 2021. The attached music and theatre venue, known as YouTube Theater, has a capacity of 6,000 seats. The stadium and performance center are considered to be separate facilities under one roof. While the stadium has a skylight roof on top, it is an open-air facility that has often been mistaken as a traditional climate-controlled domed stadium due to how its structure looks from afar and/or on television broadcasts.

Another component of the stadium's design is the Infinity Screen by Samsung, an ovular, double-sided 4K HDR halo video board, the first of its kind, that is suspended from the roof over the field. Formerly known as "the Oculus" before a name change, the structure weighs 2.2 million pounds (1,000 t) and displays 80 million pixels. The Infinity Screen also houses the stadium's 260-speaker audio system by JBL professionals as well as 56 5G wireless antennas.

Outdoor sports in California are usually played on grass due to the state's highly favorable climate. However, a grass field is very difficult to maintain to an acceptable standard when it is used by more than one gridiron football team. Because SoFi Stadium was intended from the outset to be used by two NFL teams, the designers opted not to install a natural playing surface. The stadium joined California Memorial Stadium and Valley Children's Stadium as the only major sports facilities in California currently in use to have artificial turf installed.

=== Awards ===
SoFi Stadium has won a number of industry awards for its design, including, but not limited to:

- "Stadium of the Year" in StadiumDB's Jury Award.
- "Outstanding Architectural Engineering Project" of 2021 by the American Society of Civil Engineers.
- The "Excellence in Action" Award to West Basin Municipal Water District (West Basin), the City of Inglewood, and other project partners for the SoFi Stadium Recycled Water Project.
- Steel Winner in Tekla's North America BIM Awards

== History ==
=== Background ===
The stadium site was previously home to Hollywood Park, later sold and referred to as Betfair Hollywood Park, which was a thoroughbred race course from 1938 until it was shut down for racing and training in December 2013. Most of the complex was demolished in 2014 to make way for new construction with the rest demolished in late 2016 after the Hollywood Park Casino, which remained open after the track itself closed, moved to a new building. The current stadium was not the first stadium proposed for the site. The site was almost home to an NFL stadium two decades earlier. In May 1995, after the departure of the Rams for St. Louis, the NFL team owners approved, by a 27–1 vote with two abstentions, a resolution supporting a plan to build a $200 million, privately funded stadium on property owned by Hollywood Park for the Los Angeles Raiders. Al Davis, who was then the Raiders owner, balked and refused the deal over a stipulation that he would have had to accept a second team at the stadium.

On January 31, 2014, the Los Angeles Times reported that Stan Kroenke, owner of the St. Louis Rams, purchased a 60-acre (24 ha) parcel of land just north of the Hollywood Park site in the area that had been studied by the NFL in the past for the 1995 Raiders proposal and that the league at one point attempted to purchase. This set off immediate speculation as to what Kroenke's intentions were for the site: After the site's former Hollywood Park owners gave up on getting an NFL stadium for the site in the mid-2000s it was sold and planned to be a Walmart Supercenter; however, in 2014, most of the speculation centered on the site as a possible stadium site or training facility for the Rams. NFL Commissioner Roger Goodell represented that Kroenke informed the league of the purchase. As an NFL owner, any purchase of land in which a potential stadium could be built must be disclosed to the league. Speculation about the Rams' returning to their home of nearly fifty years had already been discussed when Kroenke was one of the finalists in bidding for ownership in the Los Angeles Dodgers, but speculation increased when the news broke that the Rams owner had a possible stadium site in hand.

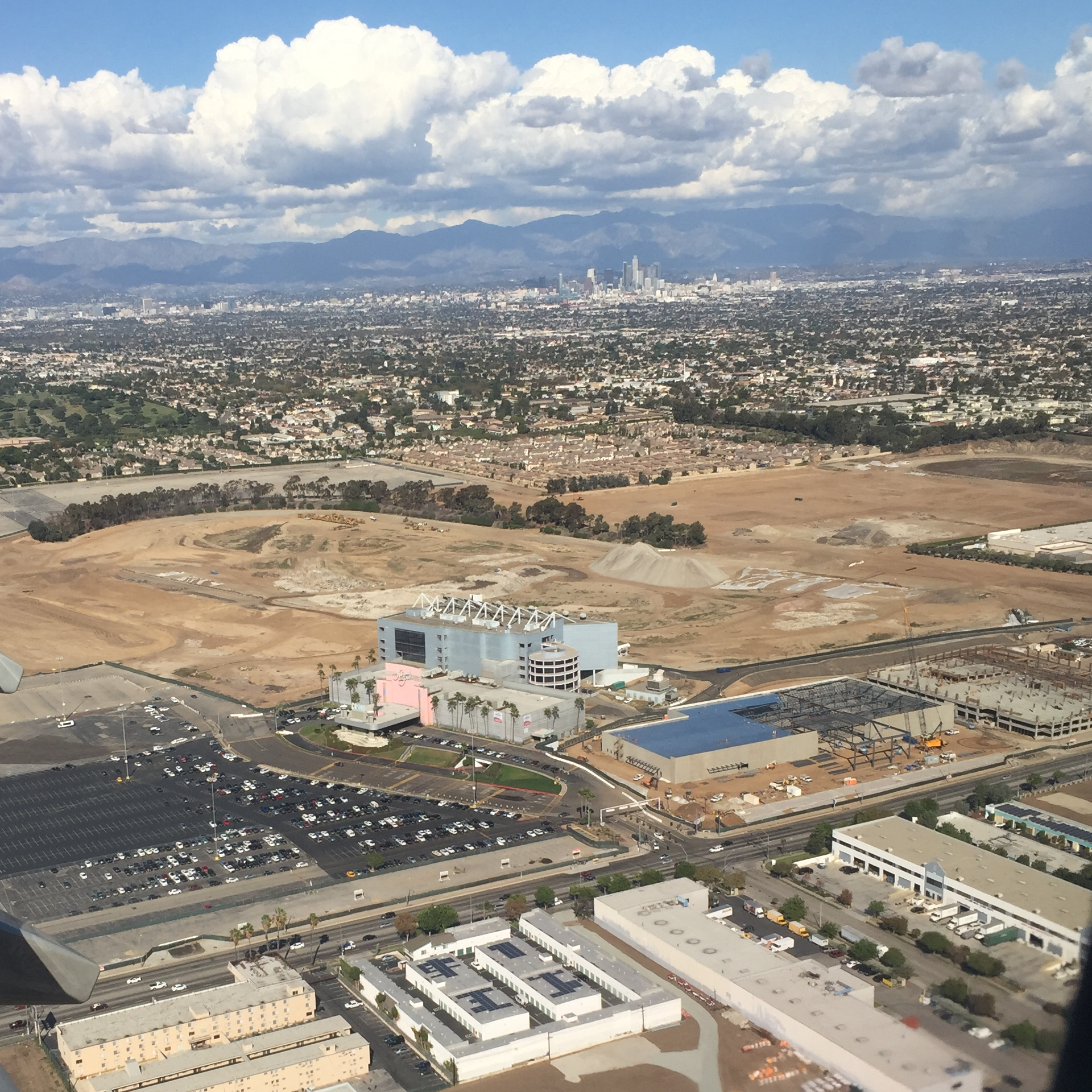
2015 aerial view of former racetrack and complex site, with the Downtown Los Angeles skyline in background

Nearly a year went by without a word from Kroenke about his intentions for the land, as he failed to ever address the St. Louis media, or the Hollywood Park Land Company, about what the site may be used for. There was, however, speculation about the future of the Rams franchise until it was reported that the National Football League would not be allowing any franchise relocation for the 2015 season.

On January 5, 2015, Stockbridge Capital Group, the owners of the Hollywood Park Land Company, announced that it had partnered with Kroenke Sports & Entertainment to add the northern 60-acre (24 ha) parcel to the rest of the development project and build a multi-purpose 70,240-seat stadium designed for the NFL. The project would include the stadium and a performance arts venue attached to the stadium with up to 6,000 seats. The previously approved Hollywood Park development was reconfigured to fit the stadium, and included plans for up to 900,000 square feet (84,000 m^{2}) of retail, 800,000 square feet (74,000 m^{2}) of office space, 2,500 new residential units, a luxury hotel with over 300 rooms, 25 acres (10 ha) of public parks, playgrounds, open space, a lake, and pedestrian, bicycle, and mass-transit access for future services. On February 24, 2015, the Inglewood City Council approved plans with a 5–0 unanimous vote to combine the 60-acre (24 ha) plot of land with the larger Hollywood Park development and rezone the area to include sports and entertainment capabilities. This essentially cleared the way for developers to begin construction on the venue as planned in December 2015.

It was reported in early February 2015, that "earth was being moved" and the site was being graded in preparation for the construction that would begin later in the year.

The project was competing directly with a rival proposal. On February 19, 2015, the Oakland Raiders and the San Diego Chargers announced plans for a privately financed $1.85 billion stadium that the two teams would have built in Carson if they were to move to the Los Angeles market. The project was, like the Inglewood project, also approved to move forward and cleared for development. The two projects spent the remainder of 2015 jockeying for the right to get approved by the NFL.

=== Financing ===
The stadium was built privately, but as of 2015, the developer was seeking significant tax breaks from Inglewood. At the commencement of construction, the cost of the stadium was estimated at $2.66 billion. But internal league documents, produced by the NFL in March 2018, indicated a need to raise the debt ceiling for the stadium and facility to a total of $4.963 billion. Team owners voted to approve this new debt ceiling at a meeting that same month. Another $500 million in loans was approved by the NFL in May 2020, putting the total cost at $5.5 billion and making it the most expensive stadium ever built.

=== Construction ===
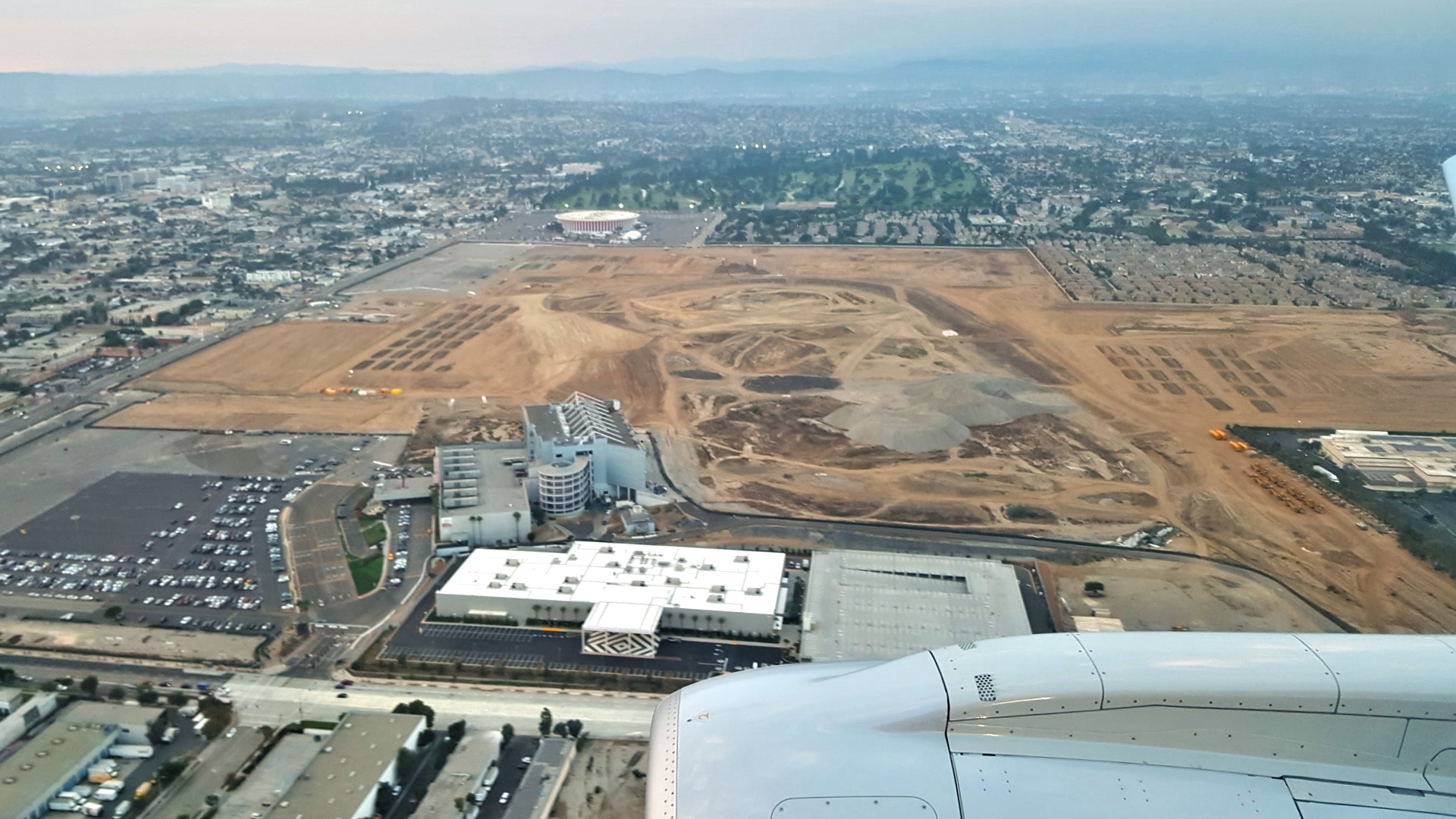
2016 aerial view of the stadium construction site, adjacent to The Forum. The new Hollywood Park Casino is in the foreground.

The NFL approved the Inglewood proposal and the Rams' relocation back to Los Angeles, 30–2, on January 12, 2016, over the rival Carson proposal. On July 14, 2016, it was announced that Turner Construction and AECOM Hunt would oversee construction of the stadium and that the architectural firm HKS would design the stadium. On October 19, 2016, the Federal Aviation Administration (FAA) determined that a 110-foot (34 m) tall LB 44 rotary drill rig would not pose a hazard to air navigation, so it approved the first of several pieces of heavy equipment to be used during construction. The stadium design had been under review by the FAA for more than a year because of concerns about how the structure would interact with radar at nearby Los Angeles International Airport (LAX). On December 16, 2016, it was reported in Sports Business Journal that the FAA had declined to issue permits for cranes needed to build the structure. "We're not going to evaluate any crane applications until our concerns with the overall project are resolved," said FAA spokesman Ian Gregor. The FAA had previously recommended building the stadium at another site because of the risks posed to LAX—echoing concerns raised by former United States Secretary of Homeland Security Tom Ridge. The Rams held the groundbreaking construction ceremony at the stadium site on November 17, 2016. The ceremony featured NFL Commissioner Roger Goodell and Rams' owner Stan Kroenke. On December 23, 2016, the FAA approved the large construction cranes to build the stadium.

On May 18, 2017, developers announced that record rainfall in the area had postponed the stadium's completion and opening from 2019 until the 2020 NFL season. On August 8, 2017, the LA Stadium Premiere Center opened in Playa Vista, featuring interactive multimedia displays and models showcasing the design and features of the new stadium (with a particular focus on prospective buyers of premium suites and seats at the facility).

In March 2018, the NFL announced that it would relocate its NFL Media unit (which manages the NFL's in-house media units, including NFL Network, digital properties, and NFL Films among other units) from Culver City to a new 200,000-square-foot (19,000 m^{2}) facility neighboring the stadium in the Hollywood Park development including a studio capable of hosting audiences, as well as an outdoor studio. The new facility was completed in 2021. On June 26, 2018, the new stadium was ceremonially topped out.

As of August 2019, one year before the planned opening, Rams chief operating officer Kevin Demoff stated that the stadium was 75 percent complete.

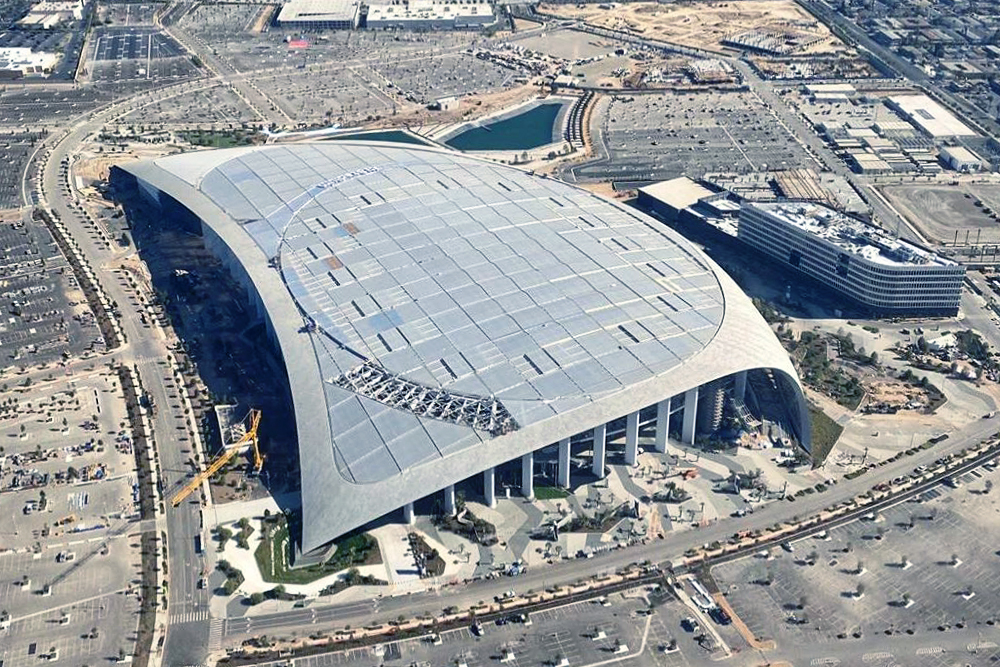
The almost-completed stadium in July 2020

In January 2020, Demoff announced that construction was 85 percent complete, with roof and oculus work, as well as seat installation, still in progress. In February 2020, a large crane collapsed—no one was injured. Amidst the COVID-19 pandemic and stay-at-home orders issued by the California state government in March 2020, construction (exempted as a critical infrastructure project) continued with social distancing and heightened health and safety standards. Demoff acknowledged that there was a possibility that its completion could be delayed, explaining that it was "not the time you want to be finishing a stadium, in this environment as you prepare", but that "our stadium, and I believe the Raiders' stadium as well, will both be amazing when they are finished and when they will begin play, which will certainly happen in the near future, whether that's in July, August, September, in 2021". Five construction workers were reported to have tested positive, including an ironworker who had worked in an assembly area away from the structure, and a backfill operator who had worked in an "isolated area outside the building" and had not entered it. On June 5, 2020, construction on the facility was temporarily halted after an ironworker fell to his death through a hole in the roof created by the removal of a panel for maintenance. On June 9, 2020, construction on the facility resumed everywhere but the roof.

=== Canceled or postponed opening events, first events ===
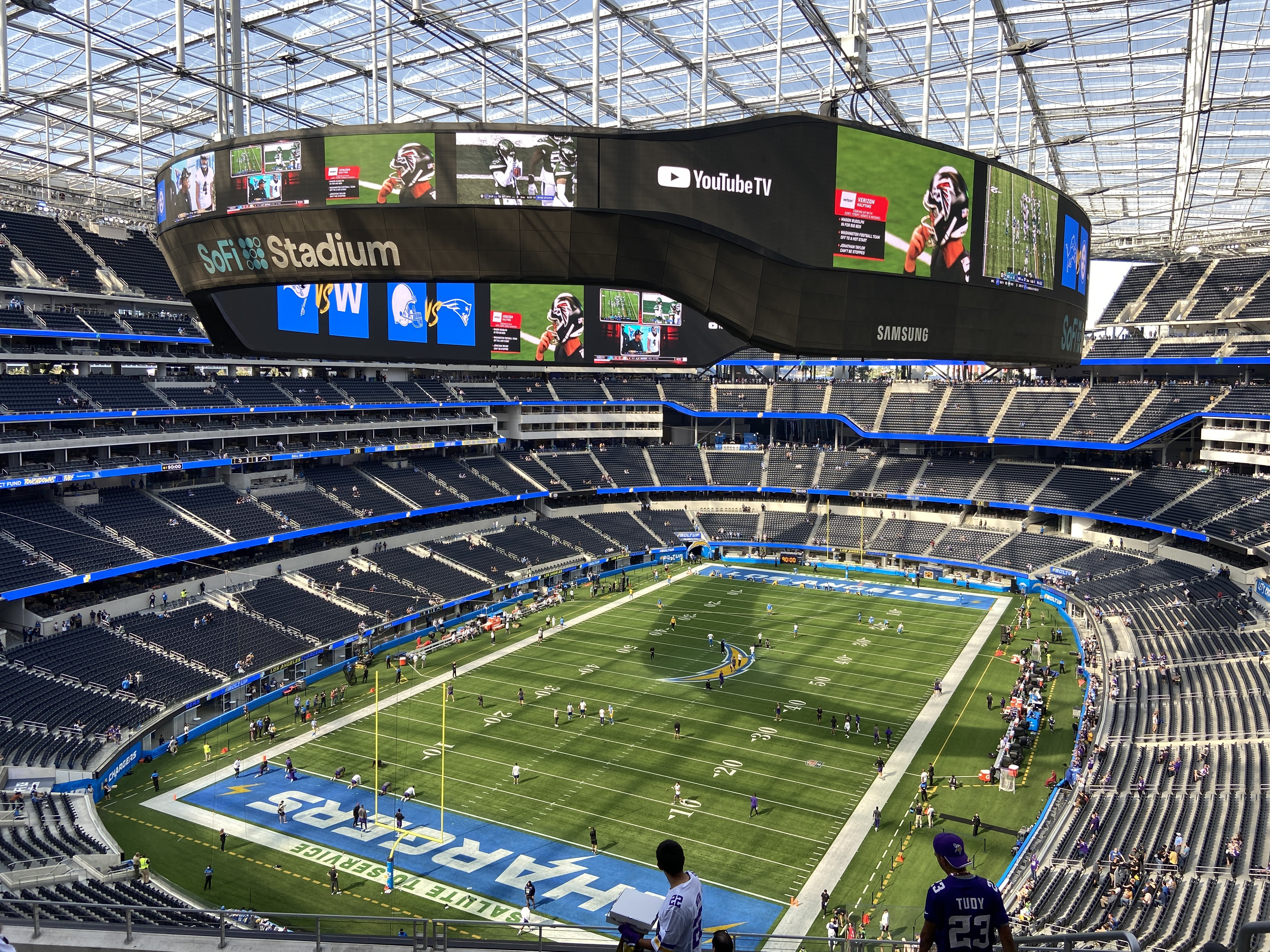
Interior of SoFi Stadium in November 2021

The entirety of the NFL preseason was also cancelled; the Rams held their first practice at the stadium on August 22, 2020. On August 25, the Rams and Chargers announced that all games at the stadium would be held behind closed doors "until further notice". An official ribbon-cutting ceremony was hosted on September 8, ahead of its first NFL event on September 13—featuring the Rams hosting and defeating the Dallas Cowboys 20–17 in the first Sunday Night game of the season. The Chargers would have their first game at the stadium a week later, though they would fall to the Kansas City Chiefs 23–20. The first athletic contest with spectators present occurred on May 15, 2021, with LA Giltinis defeating Utah Warriors, 38–27, in a Major League Rugby match before 4,880 spectators. The Los Angeles Rams hosted the Chicago Bears for the first NFL regular-season game at the stadium with fans in attendance on September 12, 2021, a 34–14 Rams win before a crowd of 70,445. A week later, the Los Angeles Chargers would hold their first regular season game at the stadium with fans in attendance, though they would fall to the Dallas Cowboys 20–17 before a crowd of 70,240. The first playoff game at the stadium took place on January 17, 2022, a 34–11 Rams victory against the Arizona Cardinals before a crowd of 70,625.

All of the originally announced summer concerts at the venue were cancelled or postponed by the pandemic, including a two-night stop of Taylor Swift's Lover Fest on July 25 and 26, 2020 (originally announced as the stadium's grand opening and later cancelled, though she concluded the 2023 U.S. leg of The Eras Tour at the stadium), and tours by Guns N' Roses (2020 Tour, they would perform at nearby BMO Stadium instead), Kenny Chesney (Chillaxification Tour, though he would perform in 2022 at the stadium), Tim McGraw (Here on Earth Tour), Mötley Crüe, and Def Leppard (The Stadium Tour, though they would perform in 2022 at the stadium). On May 2, 2021, the stadium hosted its first major event with spectators present, the filming of the Global Citizen-organized concert special Vax Live: The Concert to Reunite the World, hosted by Selena Gomez and featuring Jennifer Lopez, Eddie Vedder, the Foo Fighters, H.E.R., J Balvin, and the Duke of Sussex, which aimed to promote COVID-19 vaccination. After COVID-19 restrictions were eased, SoFi Stadium hosted its first in-person concert event by American DJ Kaskade on July 17. Mexican regional music group Los Bukis kicked off their reunion tour on August 27 and 28, filling the stadium to capacity.

On November 27 and 28, and December 1 and 2, the stadium hosted Permission to Dance on Stage—LA, a run of four concerts by the K-pop group BTS. The shows took in a gross of $33.3 million; Billboard reported them to be the highest-grossing concert engagement to ever be held in California, the second-largest in North America overall (surpassed only by a 10-show run at Giants Stadium by Bruce Springsteen), and the highest-grossing run of concerts at a single venue since 2012.

On April 29, 2023, the stadium hosted its first ever Monster Jam event. Grave Digger would end up winning the overall event championship. Two months later, it was announced that the stadium would play host to Monster Jam World Finals 23 on May 18, 2024. Monster Jam returned to the stadium on May 17, 2025, and on April 11, 2026.

The stadium hosted City Year Los Angeles Spring Break Fundraiser on May 4, 2024, with a performance by John Legend. On February 1, 2025, the stadium hosted the Honda Battle of the Bands, the first on the West Coast.

== Naming ==
On September 15, 2019, it was announced that the San Francisco–based financial services company SoFi had acquired the naming rights to the new stadium under a 20-year deal valued at over $30 million per-year, a record for any naming rights for a sports venue. The company became an official partner of both the Rams and the Chargers, as well as a partner of the performance venue and surrounding entertainment district.

The covered open space formerly known as Champions Plaza between the playing field and the performance venue within the stadium was officially named American Airlines Plaza, as the airline has a hub at nearby LAX. The airline was named the first founding partner on August 6, 2019.

The performance venue was officially named YouTube Theater (the company is based in San Bruno) on June 28, 2021.

For the 2026 FIFA World Cup, the stadium was referred to "Los Angeles Stadium" in accordance with FIFA's policy on corporate-sponsored names. Likewise, for the 2028 Summer Olympics, the stadium will be referred to as "2028 Stadium" for the duration of the Games.

== Teams ==
The St. Louis Rams were first to commit to moving to the stadium, as NFL approval for their relocation to Los Angeles was obtained on January 12, 2016. The approval, as part of a concession made by Kroenke to get the stadium project and Rams relocation approved, also gave the San Diego Chargers the first option to relocate to Los Angeles and share the stadium with the Rams, conditioned on a negotiated lease agreement between the two teams. The option would have expired on January 15, 2017, at which time the Oakland Raiders would have acquired the same option.

On January 29, 2016, the Rams and the Chargers came to an agreement in principle to share the stadium. Both teams would contribute a $200 million stadium loan from the NFL and personal seat license fees to the construction costs and would pay $1 per year in rent to the facility's controlling entity, StadCo LA, LLC. The same day, Chargers chairman and CEO Dean Spanos announced the team would remain in San Diego for the 2016 NFL season, while continuing to work with local government on a new stadium. Measure C (the Chargers stadium proposal) did not receive the requisite number of votes required for passage.

On January 12, 2017, the Chargers exercised their option and announced plans to relocate to Los Angeles for the 2017 season, making the Chargers the second tenant at the stadium and returning them to the market where they played their inaugural season in 1960. The Chargers exercising of their option led the Raiders to move to Las Vegas, Nevada, instead, and they began play at Allegiant Stadium in 2020.

The Rams' and the Chargers' move into the stadium marked the return of major professional sports to Inglewood for the first time since the Los Angeles Lakers and Los Angeles Kings left The Forum for the Staples Center (now Crypto.com Arena) in Downtown Los Angeles in October 1999.

In November 2025, it was reported that the UCLA Bruins were exploring a move from the Rose Bowl in Pasadena to SoFi Stadium.

== Major events ==
=== Super Bowls ===
Date	Winning team	Result	Losing team	Event	Attendance
February 13, 2022	Los Angeles Rams	23–20	Cincinnati Bengals	Super Bowl LVI	70,048
February 14, 2027		–		Super Bowl LXI	

==== Super Bowl LVI ====
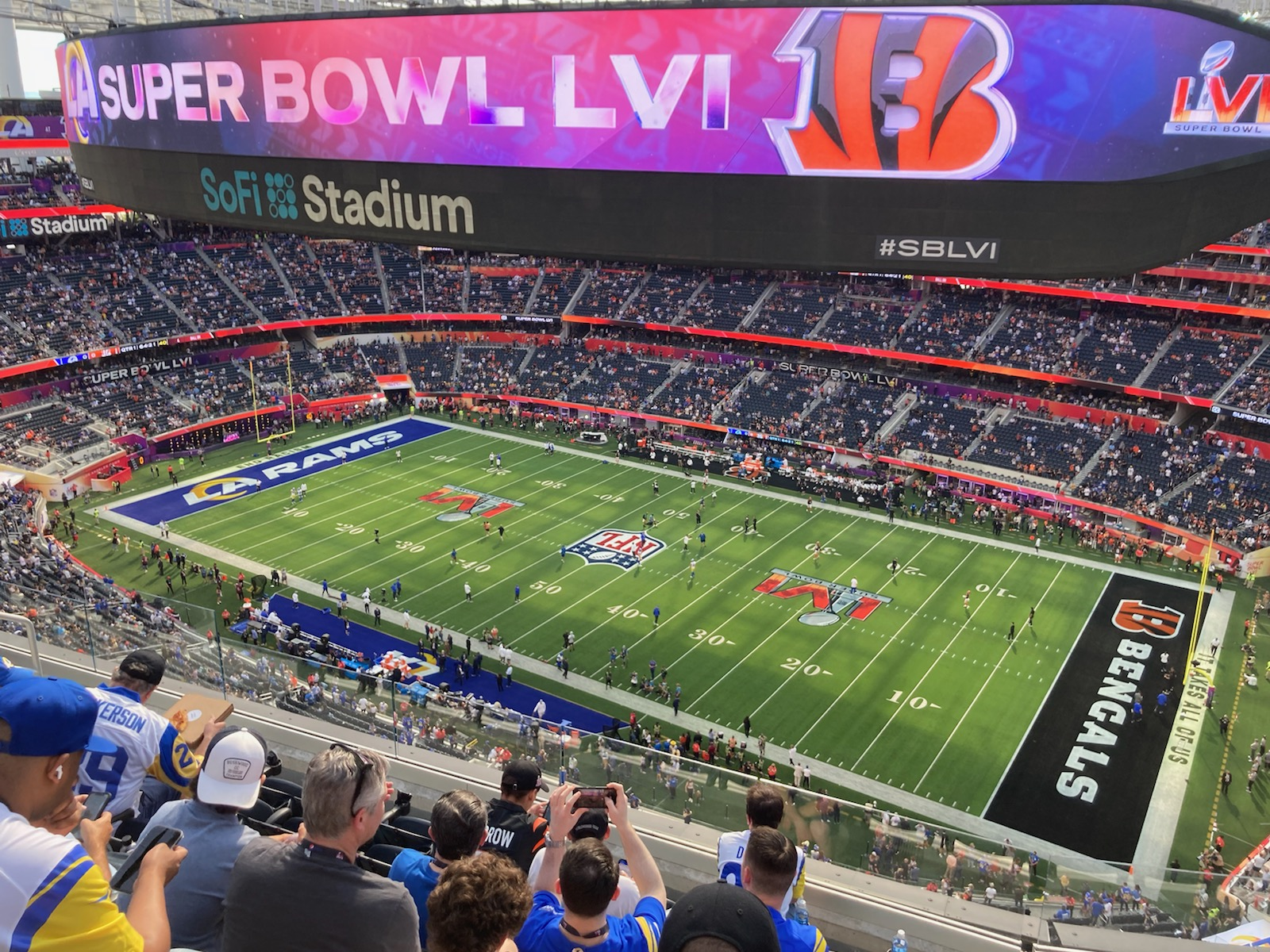
Pre-game warmups before Super Bowl LVI

SoFi Stadium hosted Super Bowl LVI on February 13, 2022, marking the first Super Bowl to be played in the Los Angeles area since Super Bowl XXVII in 1993. The stadium was originally awarded Super Bowl LV (2021) at an NFL owners' meeting in May 2016; in May 2017, because the stadium's opening was delayed to 2020, the NFL chose to re-award Super Bowl LV to Raymond James Stadium in Tampa (which was the remaining city in a pool of four used to determine the hosts of Super Bowl LIII through LV), and award LVI to Los Angeles instead. Because issues may need to be addressed in an inaugural season, the NFL does not allow a stadium to host the Super Bowl during its first season of operation.

In 2022, SoFi Stadium became the first stadium to host a conference championship game and the Super Bowl in the same year. With the Rams winning the 2021 NFC Championship Game, they became only the second team behind the Tampa Bay Buccaneers to play a Super Bowl in their home stadium, although the Rams were the away team, since the AFC (Cincinnati Bengals) was the designated home team. Following the Rams' 23–20 victory against the Bengals, it also became the second stadium to see its main tenant win the Super Bowl after Raymond James Stadium.

==== Super Bowl LXI ====
SoFi Stadium will host Super Bowl LXI on February 14, 2027, its second Super Bowl.

=== College football ===
==== College Football Playoff National Championship ====
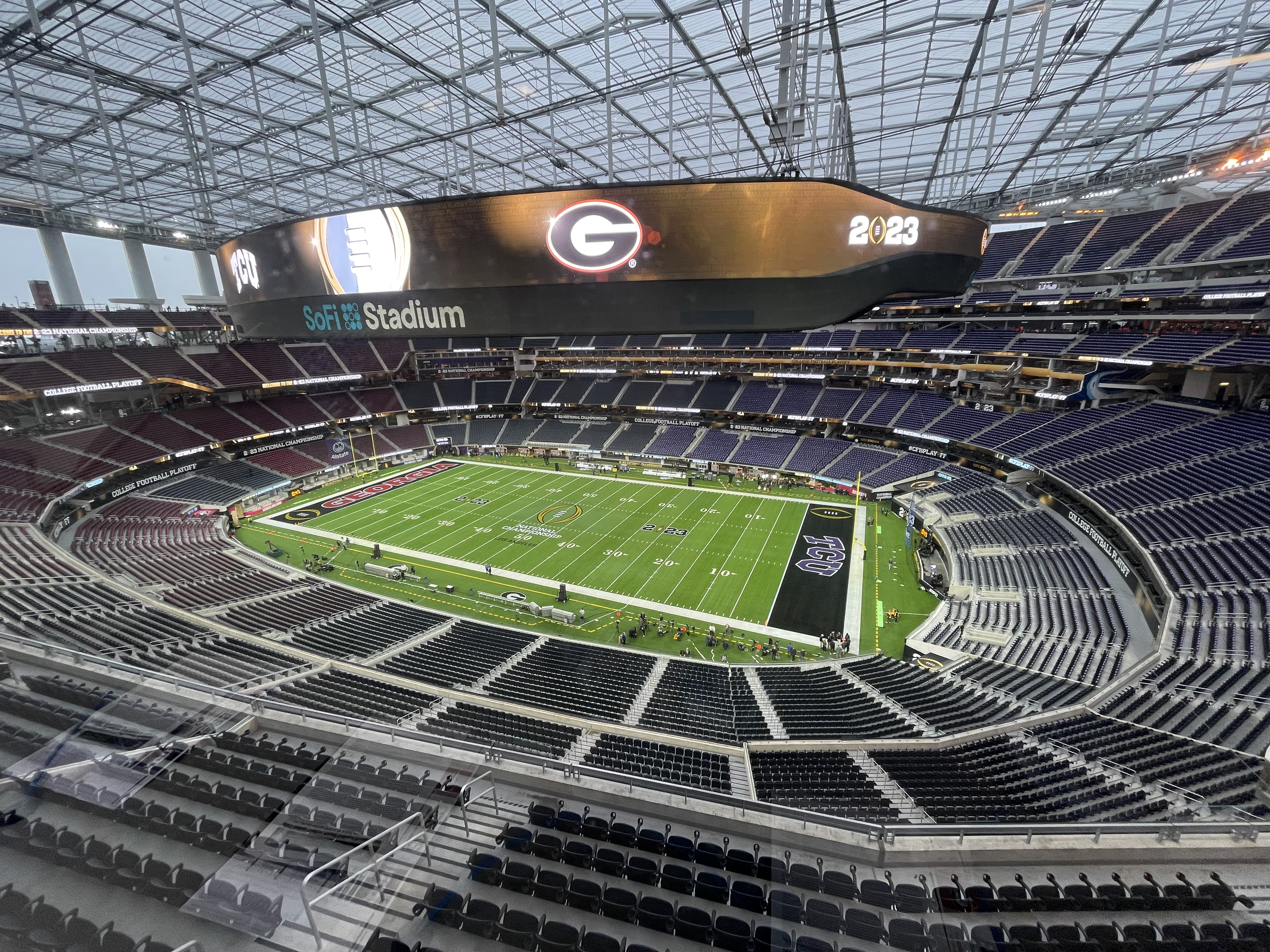
SoFi Stadium set up for the 2023 CFP National Championship Game.

On November 1, 2017, it was announced that the stadium would host the 2023 College Football Playoff National Championship. The Georgia Bulldogs, winners of the Peach Bowl and TCU Horned Frogs, winners of the Fiesta Bowl played on January 9, 2023. Georgia won 65–7, making it the largest margin of victory in a national championship game, and at the time, was the largest margin of victory any bowl game at the Football Bowl Subdivision (FBS) level, until Georgia surpassed that margin in the 2023 Orange Bowl.

==== LA Bowl ====
The Mountain West and Pac-12 conferences played a bowl game at SoFi Stadium that was known as the LA Bowl from 2021 to 2025. The conference tie-ins for the game moved from the Las Vegas Bowl. The inaugural edition of the game in 2021 featured Utah State defeating Oregon State 24–13. The final edition of the game in 2025 featured Washington defeating Boise State 38–10.

Date	Winning team	Result	Losing team	Attendance	Notes
December 18, 2021	Utah State	24–13	Oregon State	29,896	notes
December 17, 2022	Fresno State	29–6	Washington State	32,405	notes
December 16, 2023	UCLA	35–22	Boise State	32,780	notes
December 18, 2024	UNLV	24–13	California	24,420	notes
December 13, 2025	Washington	38–10	Boise State	23,269	notes

==== High school football ====
On October 13, 2023, SoFi Stadium hosted its first high school football game between Downey rivals Warren High School and Downey High School, with the winner being invited to and honored at the 2023 LA Bowl. 18,000 people watched Warren defeat Downey 28–21.

On October 18, 2024, Servite faced St. John Bosco at SoFi Stadium. St. John Bosco defeated Servite 27–17 in front of 6,900 spectators. On October 25, 2024, SoFi Stadium hosted another high school game, this time between East Los Angeles rivals Garfield High School and Roosevelt High School. 15,000 watched Garfield defeat Roosevelt 38–28.

=== Soccer ===
SoFi Stadium hosted a club friendly doubleheader on August 3, 2022, between two Major League Soccer clubs based in Los Angeles and two Liga MX clubs from Mexico: the Los Angeles Galaxy defeated Chivas Guadalajara 2–0; and Los Angeles FC lost in a penalty shootout against Club America. The event was sold out and was part of the Leagues Cup Showcase.

Date	Winning team	Result	Losing team	Event	Attendance
August 3, 2022	LA Galaxy (United States)	2–0	(Mexico) Guadalajara	Leagues Cup Showcase	71,189
August 3, 2022	Club América (Mexico)	0–0 (6–5 pen.)	(United States) Los Angeles FC	Leagues Cup Showcase	71,189
July 16, 2023	Mexico	1–0	Panama	2023 CONCACAF Gold Cup Final	72,963
July 26, 2023	Arsenal (England)	5–3	(Spain) Barcelona	Club Friendly	70,223
June 24, 2024	Brazil	0–0	Costa Rica	2024 Copa América Group D	67,158
June 26, 2024	Venezuela	1–0	Mexico	2024 Copa América Group B	72,773
July 27, 2024	Arsenal (England)	2–1	(England) Manchester United	Club Friendly	62,486
March 20, 2025	Panama	1–0	United States	2025 CONCACAF Nations League Finals	50,925
March 20, 2025	Mexico	2–0	Canada	2025 CONCACAF Nations League Finals	50,925
March 23, 2025	Canada	2–1	United States	2025 CONCACAF Nations League Finals	68,212
March 23, 2025	Mexico	2–1	Panama	2025 CONCACAF Nations League Final	68,212
April 5, 2025	United States	2–0	Brazil	Women's International Friendly	32,303
June 14, 2025	Mexico	3–2	Dominican Republic	2025 CONCACAF Gold Cup Group A	54,309
March 25, 2027	Canada		Panama	2027 CONCACAF Nations League Finals	
March 25, 2027	United States		Mexico	2027 CONCACAF Nations League Finals	
March 28, 2027	Canada/Panama		United States/Mexico	2027 CONCACAF Nations League Finals	
March 28, 2027	Canada/Panama		United States/Mexico	2027 CONCACAF Nations League Final	

==== International matches ====
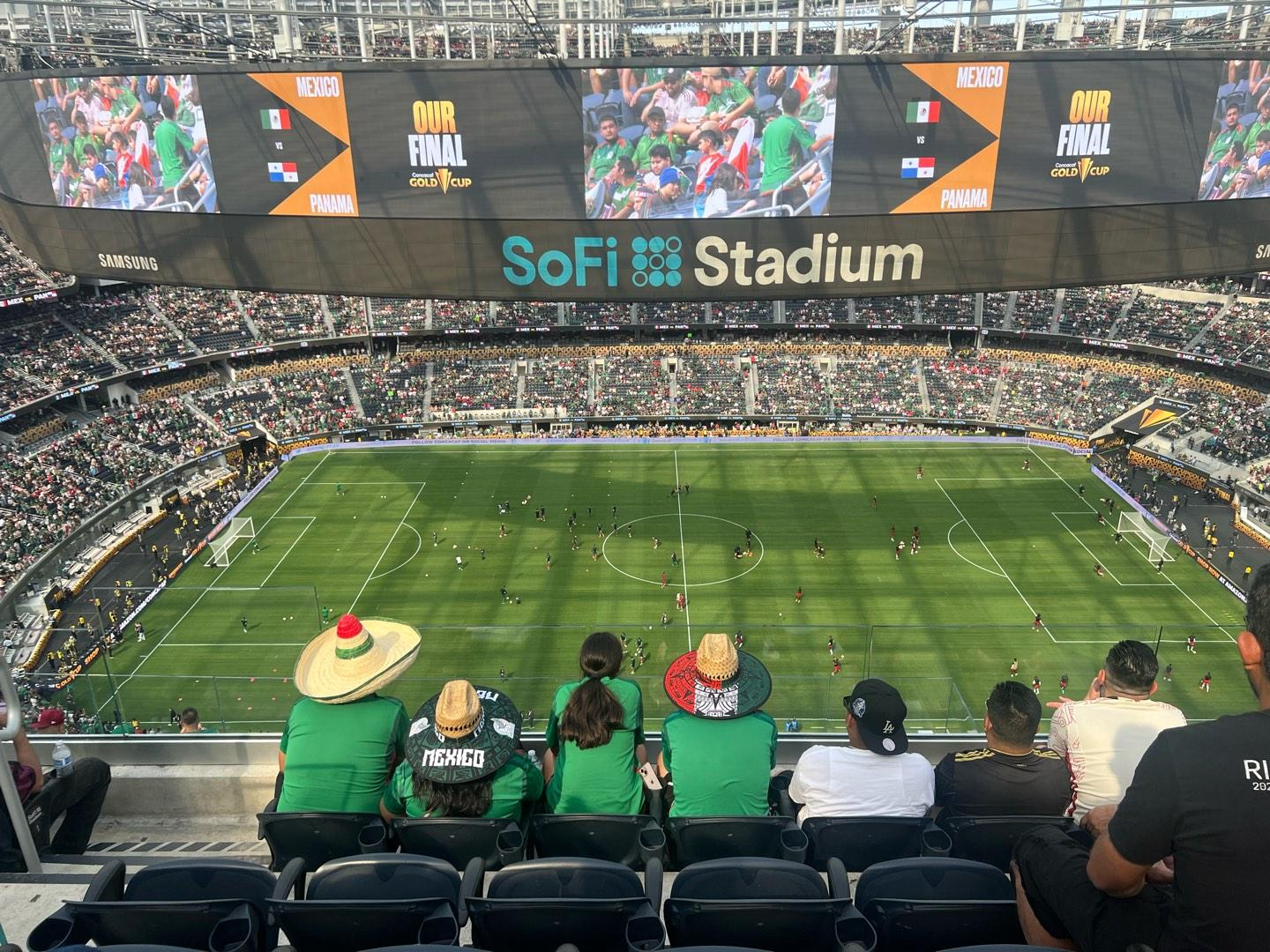
SoFi Stadium during the 2023 CONCACAF Gold Cup final

The stadium hosted the 2023 CONCACAF Gold Cup final on July 16, 2023. It was the seventh final held in the Los Angeles area. Mexico won 1–0 against Panama. The stadium also hosted two matches during 2024 Copa América, the 2025 CONCACAF Gold Cup, and the 2025 and 2027 CONCACAF Nations League Finals.

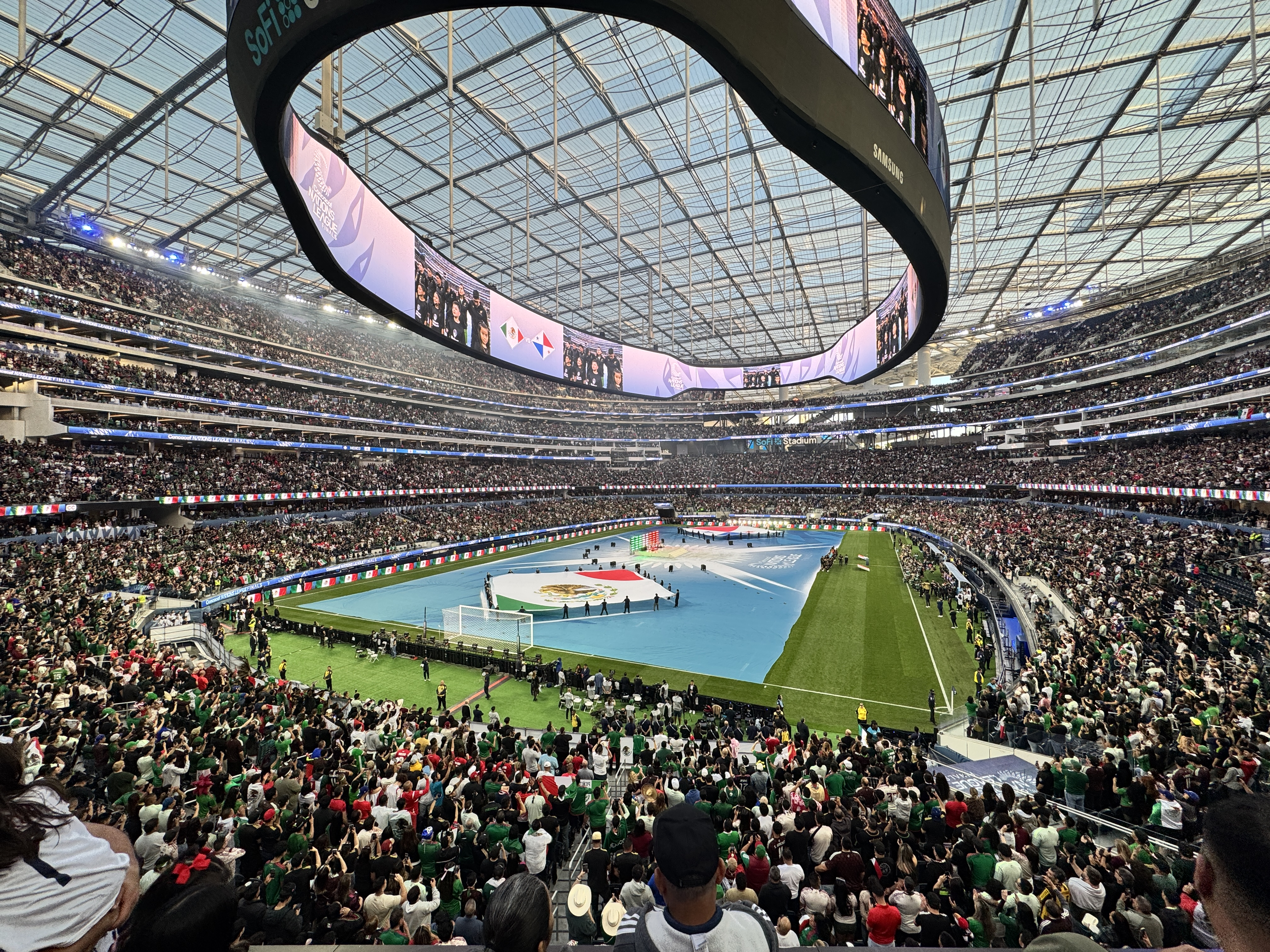
SoFi Stadium before the 2025 CONCACAF Nations League final

==== 2026 FIFA World Cup ====
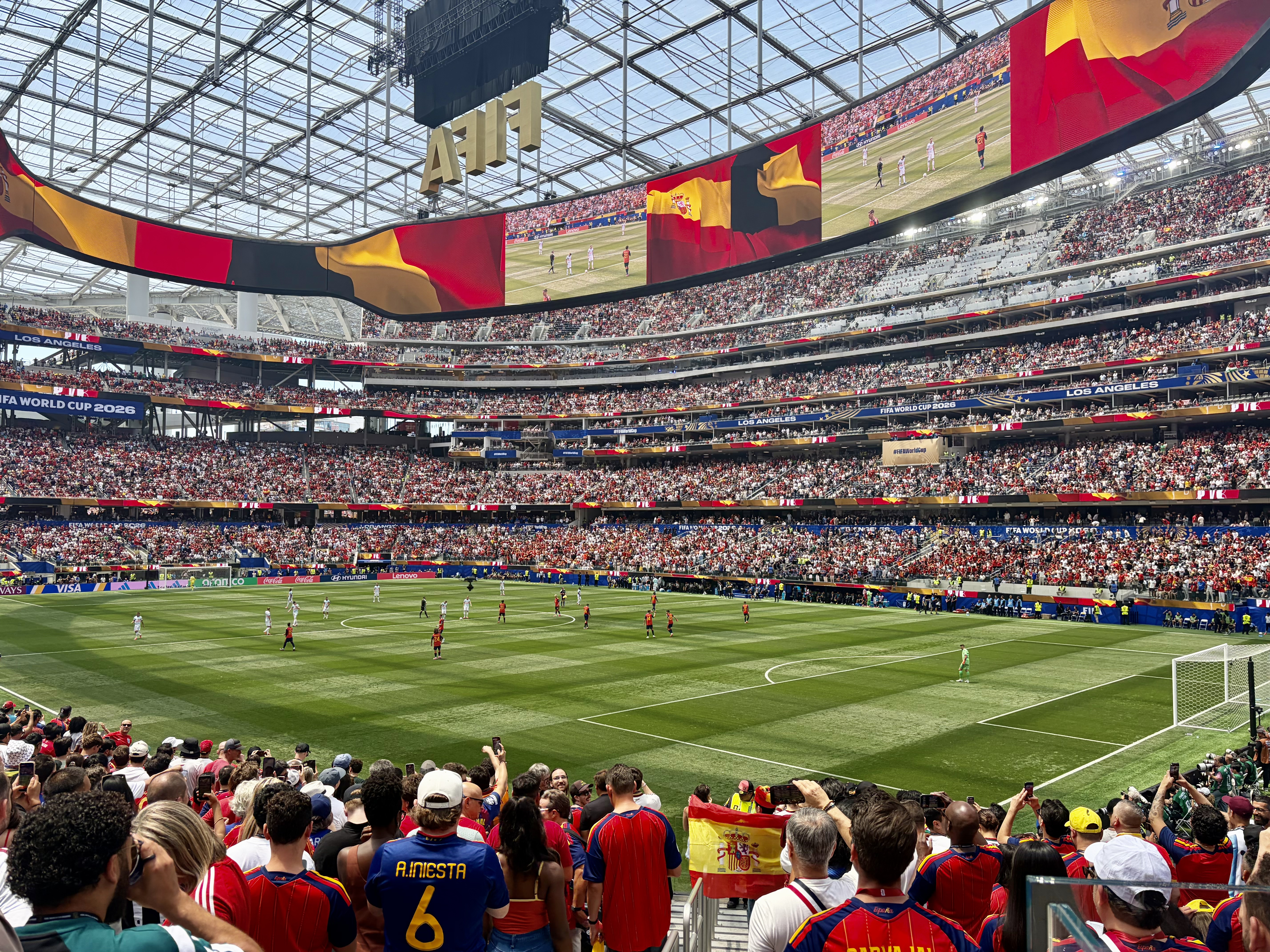
Inside SoFi Stadium during the quarter-final match between Spain and Belgium at the 2026 FIFA World Cup.

The local bid for Los Angeles in the 2026 FIFA World Cup was organized by private businesses led by AEG with assistance from the Los Angeles Sports and Entertainment District Commission, Los Angeles FC, the LA Galaxy, and Rose Bowl Stadium. The Los Angeles City Council approved the bid after private businesses showed support and offered to pay hosting costs. SoFi Stadium was initially not selected as a bidding venue in the winning Canada–Mexico–United States bid because the organizing committee left unbuilt venues out of its final evaluations, but it was later added to the proposal. The United bid to host the World Cup was selected by FIFA on June 13, 2018, and SoFi stadium was confirmed to host multiple matches during the tournament. SoFi Stadium was one of sixteen venues set to host matches. It was also one of eleven US venues being used and was one of two venues in California which hosted matches, the other being Levi's Stadium in the San Francisco Bay Area.

In June 2026, workers at SoFi Stadium voted 96 percent in favor of authorizing a strike in early June 2026 after working for a year without a contract. Unite Here Local 11, representing nearly 2,000 food service workers employed by Legends Hospitality, cited stalled negotiations over pay and safety protections related to potential ICE activity at the stadium. The union had asked FIFA and stadium operators to bar ICE from the venue and filed complaints with California regulators over FIFA's accreditation process, which collected workers' nationality and country of birth. On June 1, Los Angeles County Sheriff Robert Luna said federal officials had told him that civil immigration enforcement would not take place at World Cup games or events in Los Angeles. A tentative agreement was reached on June 8, three days before the stadium's first match, preserving a contractual right for workers to strike if the union determines that federal immigration enforcement threatens worker safety during a match.

The stadium lacked a regulation-sized soccer field due to its narrow width, which has been criticized by FIFA officials. To satisfy FIFA requirements, several field level seats would be removed and the turf surface replaced by a grass field. In September 2023, Stan Kroenke threatened to pull hosting from the stadium until a dispute regarding revenue sharing between him and FIFA could be resolved, though it was confirmed in January 2024 that the stadium would still be hosting matches. On February 4, 2024, it was announced that the stadium would host the opening match for the United States on June 12, 2026, as well as their third group match on June 25, 2026. SoFi Stadium hosted eight matches: five group stage matches, two Round of 32 matches and a quarterfinal match.

Due to FIFA's clean stadium policy, SoFi Stadium was temporarily renamed to Los Angeles Stadium for the tournament.

Date	Team #1	Res.	Team #2	Round	Attendance
June 12, 2026	United States	4–1	Paraguay	Group D	70,492
June 15, 2026	Iran	2–2	New Zealand	Group G	70,108
June 18, 2026	Switzerland	4–1	Bosnia and Herzegovina	Group B	70,026
June 21, 2026	Belgium	0–0	Iran	Group G	70,317
June 25, 2026	Turkey	3–2	United States	Group D	70,492
June 28, 2026	South Africa	0–1	Canada	Round of 32	69,237
July 2, 2026	Spain	3–0	Austria	Round of 32	70,492
July 10, 2026	Spain	2–1	Belgium	Quarterfinal	70,492

=== WrestleMania ===
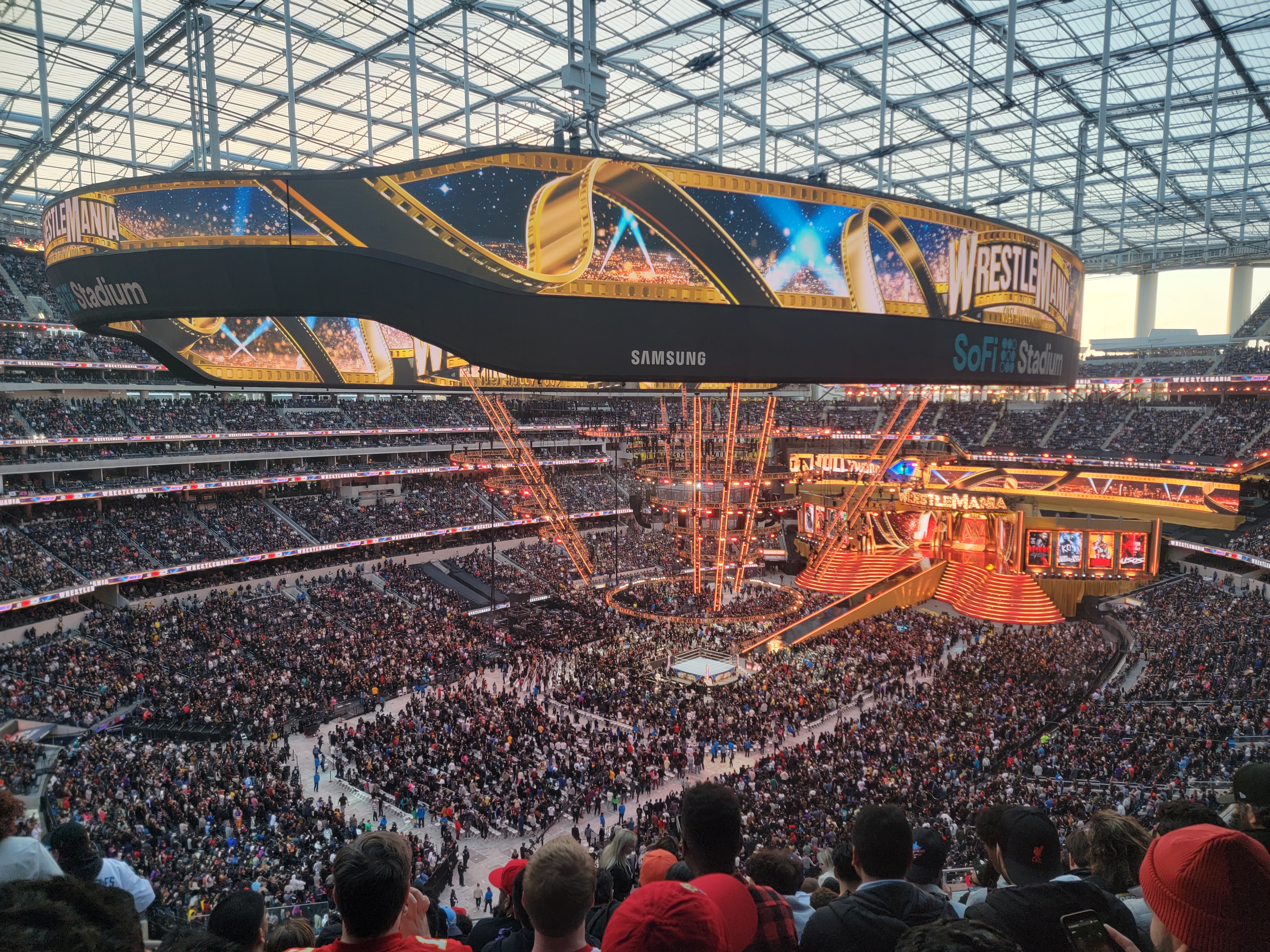
The second night of WrestleMania 39 at SoFi Stadium

On April 1 and 2, 2023, SoFi Stadium hosted WrestleMania 39, the 2023 edition of WWE's flagship professional wrestling event WrestleMania. It was the highest-grossing event in WWE history, with a reported gate of $21.6 million and a combined attendance of 161,892 fans over both nights. SoFi Stadium was originally slated to host WrestleMania 37 in 2021, but its hosting was deferred to 2023 due to the COVID-19 pandemic

=== 2028 Summer Olympics and Paralympics ===
SoFi Stadium (which, per prior precedent, will be renamed for the duration of the Games according to sponsorship rules) will host the opening and closing ceremonies of 2028 Summer Olympics and Paralympics (with organizers confirming a split format for the Olympics that would also incorporate the Los Angeles Memorial Coliseum).

The stadium will host swimming events with a planned configuration seating 38,000 spectators, making it the largest swimming venue in Olympic history. The pool will be constructed prior to the opening ceremony, and covered by the staging. To facilitate the reconfiguration process following the opening ceremony, swimming will notably take place during the second week of the Games, rather than the first as is in the several previous games. As part of their planning, the stadium sent a team to review how another NFL stadium – the Indianapolis Colts' Lucas Oil Stadium – successfully installed the pool to host the 2024 US Olympic swimming trials.

Warner Bros. Studios’ The Ranch Lot is planned to be the site of the International Broadcast Centre for the Games, while Hollywood Park Studios by SoFi Stadium will host the Main Press Center.

=== 2031 and 2033 Rugby World Cups ===
SoFi is amongst the stadiums being considered for hosting matches during the 2031 Men's Rugby World Cup and 2033 Women's Rugby World Cup.

=== Concerts ===
Date	Main act(s)	Opening act(s) / Guest(s)	Tour / Concert name	Tickets sold / available for	Gross revenue	Notes
May 2, 2021	Performers: Foo Fighters; Eddie Vedder; Jennifer Lopez; J Balvin; H.E.R.; NCT 127; Saweetie; Picture This	—N/a	Global Citizen - VAX LIVE: The Concert to Reunite the World	—N/a	—N/a	First major event with spectators present, which was invite only.
July 17, 2021	Kaskade	Deadmau5	Kaskade: Los Angeles			First major event that was open to the public.
July 24, 2021	Justin Bieber; Chance the Rapper; Jaden Smith; Tori Kelly	—N/a	The Freedom Experience	—N/a	—N/a	
August 8, 2021	The Offspring; The Maine	—N/a	ALT 98.7's "COME OUT AND PLAY"	—N/a	—N/a	Part of Los Angeles Chargers FanFest.
August 27, 2021	Los Bukis	—N/a	Una Historia Cantada		$19,382,302 (2 shows)	First sold out musical act and Latin band show to perform at SoFi.
August 28, 2021	Los Bukis	—N/a	Una Historia Cantada		$19,382,302 (2 shows)	First sold out musical act and Latin band show to perform at SoFi.
October 14, 2021	The Rolling Stones	Ghost Hounds	No Filter Tour	81,676 / 81,676 (2 shows)	$18,887,679 (2 shows)	
October 17, 2021	The Rolling Stones	The Glorious Sons	No Filter Tour	81,676 / 81,676 (2 shows)	$18,887,679 (2 shows)	
November 27, 2021	BTS	—N/a	Permission to Dance on Stage	213,752 / 213,752 (4 shows)	$33,316,345 (4 shows)	BTS was the first act to perform and sell out four shows at the stadium on a single tour
November 28, 2021	BTS	—N/a	Permission to Dance on Stage	213,752 / 213,752 (4 shows)	$33,316,345 (4 shows)	BTS was the first act to perform and sell out four shows at the stadium on a single tour
December 1, 2021	BTS	—N/a	Permission to Dance on Stage	213,752 / 213,752 (4 shows)	$33,316,345 (4 shows)	BTS was the first act to perform and sell out four shows at the stadium on a single tour
December 2, 2021	BTS	—N/a	Permission to Dance on Stage	213,752 / 213,752 (4 shows)	$33,316,345 (4 shows)	BTS was the first act to perform and sell out four shows at the stadium on a single tour
May 13, 2022	Paul McCartney	-	Got Back	43,658 / 43,658	$12,046,695	
May 28, 2022	Grupo Firme Banda El Recodo	—N/a	Enfiestados y Amanecidos Tour	—N/a	—N/a	
July 23, 2022	Kenny Chesney	Dan + Shay; Old Dominion; Carly Pearce	Here and Now Tour	50,227 (100%)	$5,467,968	Originally called the "Chillaxification Tour".
July 31, 2022	Red Hot Chili Peppers	Beck; Thundercat	2022 Global Stadium Tour	46,902 (100%)	$8,560,363	
August 27, 2022	Mötley Crüe; Def Leppard	Poison; Joan Jett and the Blackhearts; Classless Act	The Stadium Tour	43,210 (100%)	$6,192,352	
September 2, 2022	The Weeknd	Kaytranada; Mike Dean	After Hours til Dawn Tour	49,324 / 49,324	$11,132,108	
September 30, 2022	Bad Bunny	Diplo	World's Hottest Tour	99,816 / 99,816	$31,096,479	
October 1, 2022	Bad Bunny	Diplo	World's Hottest Tour	99,816 / 99,816	$31,096,479	
November 26, 2022	The Weeknd	Kaytranada; Mike Dean	After Hours til Dawn Tour	97,691 / 97,691	$17,620,155	Originally scheduled for September 3, but was rescheduled due to loss of voice.
November 27, 2022	The Weeknd	Kaytranada; Mike Dean	After Hours til Dawn Tour	97,691 / 97,691	$17,620,155	
March 3, 2023	Playboi Carti; Travis Scott; Future; Lil Wayne	Performers: Kodak Black; Tyga; Trippie Redd; DaBaby; Saweetie; Lil Baby; Don Toliver; 2 Chainz; Kevin Gates; Lil Yachty; City Girls; Aminé; Chief Keef; Lil Uzi Vert; Polo G; Moneybagg Yo; Ski Mask the Slump God; Lil Tecca; OhGeesy; Sheck Wes	Rolling Loud			First music festival held at SoFi Stadium, duration of the event was 3 days and was held outside the stadium in the parking lot
March 4, 2023	Playboi Carti; Travis Scott; Future; Lil Wayne	Performers: Kodak Black; Tyga; Trippie Redd; DaBaby; Saweetie; Lil Baby; Don Toliver; 2 Chainz; Kevin Gates; Lil Yachty; City Girls; Aminé; Chief Keef; Lil Uzi Vert; Polo G; Moneybagg Yo; Ski Mask the Slump God; Lil Tecca; OhGeesy; Sheck Wes	Rolling Loud			First music festival held at SoFi Stadium, duration of the event was 3 days and was held outside the stadium in the parking lot
March 5, 2023	Playboi Carti; Travis Scott; Future; Lil Wayne	Performers: Kodak Black; Tyga; Trippie Redd; DaBaby; Saweetie; Lil Baby; Don Toliver; 2 Chainz; Kevin Gates; Lil Yachty; City Girls; Aminé; Chief Keef; Lil Uzi Vert; Polo G; Moneybagg Yo; Ski Mask the Slump God; Lil Tecca; OhGeesy; Sheck Wes	Rolling Loud			First music festival held at SoFi Stadium, duration of the event was 3 days and was held outside the stadium in the parking lot
March 10, 2023	Stevie Nicks; Billy Joel		Two Icons, One Night	51,880	$10,884,917	
May 27, 2023	Grupo Firme					
June 3, 2023	Romeo Santos					
June 10, 2023	TWICE	—N/a	Ready To Be World Tour	48,345 (100%)	$7,966,286	The first girl group to sell out a show at SoFi Stadium.
July 22, 2023	Morgan Wallen	HARDY; Ernest; Bailey Zimmerman	One Night At A Time World Tour	TBA		
August 3, 2023	Taylor Swift	Haim; Gracie Abrams	The Eras Tour	420,000 / 420,000		Swift was the first act to perform and sell out five and six shows at the stadium on a single tour, as well as its first female act to sell out shows at SoFi Stadium. The concert film Taylor Swift: The Eras Tour features footage from the first three shows at the stadium.
August 4, 2023	Taylor Swift	Haim; Owenn	The Eras Tour	420,000 / 420,000		Swift was the first act to perform and sell out five and six shows at the stadium on a single tour, as well as its first female act to sell out shows at SoFi Stadium. The concert film Taylor Swift: The Eras Tour features footage from the first three shows at the stadium.
August 5, 2023	Taylor Swift	Haim; Gayle	The Eras Tour	420,000 / 420,000		Swift was the first act to perform and sell out five and six shows at the stadium on a single tour, as well as its first female act to sell out shows at SoFi Stadium. The concert film Taylor Swift: The Eras Tour features footage from the first three shows at the stadium.
August 7, 2023	Taylor Swift	Haim; Gracie Abrams	The Eras Tour	420,000 / 420,000		Swift was the first act to perform and sell out five and six shows at the stadium on a single tour, as well as its first female act to sell out shows at SoFi Stadium. The concert film Taylor Swift: The Eras Tour features footage from the first three shows at the stadium.
August 8, 2023	Taylor Swift	Haim; Gracie Abrams	The Eras Tour	420,000 / 420,000		Swift was the first act to perform and sell out five and six shows at the stadium on a single tour, as well as its first female act to sell out shows at SoFi Stadium. The concert film Taylor Swift: The Eras Tour features footage from the first three shows at the stadium.
August 9, 2023	Taylor Swift	Haim; Gayle	The Eras Tour	420,000 / 420,000		Swift was the first act to perform and sell out five and six shows at the stadium on a single tour, as well as its first female act to sell out shows at SoFi Stadium. The concert film Taylor Swift: The Eras Tour features footage from the first three shows at the stadium.
August 25, 2023	Metallica	Pantera; Mammoth WVH	M72 World Tour	142,738 / 142,738	$17,508,000	
August 27, 2023	Metallica	Five Finger Death Punch; Ice Nine Kills	M72 World Tour	142,738 / 142,738	$17,508,000	
September 1, 2023	Beyoncé	DJ Khaled	Renaissance World Tour	155,567 / 155,567	$45,540,402	
September 2, 2023	Beyoncé	DJ Khaled	Renaissance World Tour	155,567 / 155,567	$45,540,402	
September 4, 2023	Beyoncé	Kaytranada	Renaissance World Tour	155,567 / 155,567	$45,540,402	
September 23, 2023	Ed Sheeran	Russ; Maisie Peters	+–=÷x Tour	81,384 / 81,384	$9,225,764	Highest single show attendance in stadium history with 81,384 in attendance.
October 5, 2023	P!NK	KidCutUp; Grouplove; Pat Benatar & Neil Giraldo	Summer Carnival	49,559 / 49,559	$8,104,762	
November 5, 2023	Travis Scott	Teezo Touchdown	Circus Maximus Tour	49,735 / 49,735	$7,941,151	First hip-hop artist to sell out SoFi Stadium.
February 2, 2024	ILLENIUM		Trilogy: Los Angeles	71,096/ 71,096	$6,370,000	
February 3, 2024	ILLENIUM		Trilogy: Los Angeles	71,096/ 71,096	$6,370,000	
March 14, 2024	Nicki Minaj; Post Malone; Future; Metro Boomin ¥$	Performers: Tyga; YG; PARTYNEXTDOOR; Rae Sremmurd; Lil Tecca; Sexyy Red; Chino Pacas; Luh Tyler; BLP Kosher; DD Osama; DeeBaby; Tana; Jeleel!; Fat Nick; Terror Reid; Lay Bankz; Robb Bank$; Lil Gnar; Azchike; Kanii; Zoe Osama; Sugarhill Ddot; Chow Lee; Fourfive; Anycia; Asm Bopster; Stone Cold Jzzle; K. Charles; Gat$; $uicideboy$; Summer Walker; Big Sean; Larry June; Bones; Don Toliver; Bryson Tiller; Ski Mask the Slump God; Chief Keef; NLE Choppa; 03 Greedo; Luh Tyler; Flo Milli; Veeze; Kaliii; That Mexican OT; Fuerza Regida; Junior H; Natanael Cano; Mozzy	Rolling Loud			
March 15, 2024	Nicki Minaj; Post Malone; Future; Metro Boomin ¥$		Rolling Loud			
March 16, 2024	Nicki Minaj; Post Malone; Future; Metro Boomin ¥$		Rolling Loud			
March 17, 2024	Nicki Minaj; Post Malone; Future; Metro Boomin ¥$		Rolling Loud			
June 14, 2024	Luke Combs		Growin’ Up And Gettin’ Old Tour			
June 15, 2024	Luke Combs		Growin’ Up And Gettin’ Old Tour			
July 6, 2024	Blink-182	Pierce the Veil; Hot Milk	One More Time Tour	50,492 / 50,492		
July 10, 2024	The Rolling Stones	The War and Treaty	Hackney Diamonds Tour			
July 13, 2024	The Rolling Stones	The Linda Lindas	Hackney Diamonds Tour			
July 20, 2024	Kenny Chesney; Zac Brown Band	Megan Moroney; Uncle Kracker	Sun Goes Down 2024 Tour			
August 3, 2024	Multiple Performers	—	Hard Summer			
August 4, 2024	Multiple Performers	—	Hard Summer			
August 25, 2024	Def Leppard; Journey	Steve Miller Band	The Summer Stadium Tour			
August 31, 2024	Lionel Richie; Diana Ross	Performers: Santana; Al Green; Nile Rodgers; Chic; Gladys Knight; Chaka Khan; The Isley Brothers; Charlie Wilson; Eric Burdon & The Animals; The O'Jays; The Jacksons; War; The Spinners; Smokey Robinson; The Whispers; The Emotions; Dionne Warwick; George Clinton; Parliament-Funkadelic; Zapp; Kool & The Gang; Morris Day; The Time; Durand Jones & The Indications; Brenton Wood; Barbara Mason; Thee Sacred Souls; Mayer Hawthorne; The Delfonics; The Stylistics; The Manhattans; Los Lobos; Lady Wray; Heatwave; Shalamar; Con Funk Shun; The Pointer Sisters	Fool in Love Festival			
September 14, 2024	Green Day	The Smashing Pumpkins; Rancid; The Linda Lindas	The Saviors Tour			
March 15, 2025	Playboi Carti; ASAP Rocky; Peso Pluma	Performers: YG; Sexyy Red; Ski Mask the Slump God; Larry June; BossMan Dlow; Ian; Ab-Soul; 310babii; Xavier Wulf; Cash Cobain; Real Boston Richey; Gelo; OsamaSon; Ken Carson; Blxst; Destroy Lonely; Quavo; 03 Greedo; Dom Kennedy; Tee Grizzley; EBK Jaaybo; Homixide Gang; La Santa Grifa; Luh Tyler; Nettspend	Rolling Loud			
March 16, 2025	Playboi Carti; ASAP Rocky; Peso Pluma	Performers: YG; Sexyy Red; Ski Mask the Slump God; Larry June; BossMan Dlow; Ian; Ab-Soul; 310babii; Xavier Wulf; Cash Cobain; Real Boston Richey; Gelo; OsamaSon; Ken Carson; Blxst; Destroy Lonely; Quavo; 03 Greedo; Dom Kennedy; Tee Grizzley; EBK Jaaybo; Homixide Gang; La Santa Grifa; Luh Tyler; Nettspend	Rolling Loud			
April 17, 2025	Julión Álvarez y Su Norteño Banda		4218 Tour USA			
April 18, 2025	Julión Álvarez y Su Norteño Banda		4218 Tour USA			
April 19, 2025	Julión Álvarez y Su Norteño Banda		4218 Tour USA			
April 28, 2025	Beyoncé		Cowboy Carter Tour	217,143/217,143	$55,706,053	Highest-grossing female boxscore in history. Tied with BTS for most overall shows performed by a band or artist at the stadium.
May 1, 2025	Beyoncé		Cowboy Carter Tour	217,143/217,143	$55,706,053	Highest-grossing female boxscore in history. Tied with BTS for most overall shows performed by a band or artist at the stadium.
May 4, 2025	Beyoncé		Cowboy Carter Tour	217,143/217,143	$55,706,053	Highest-grossing female boxscore in history. Tied with BTS for most overall shows performed by a band or artist at the stadium.
May 7, 2025	Beyoncé		Cowboy Carter Tour	217,143/217,143	$55,706,053	Highest-grossing female boxscore in history. Tied with BTS for most overall shows performed by a band or artist at the stadium.
May 9, 2025	Beyoncé		Cowboy Carter Tour	217,143/217,143	$55,706,053	Highest-grossing female boxscore in history. Tied with BTS for most overall shows performed by a band or artist at the stadium.
May 21, 2025	Kendrick Lamar; SZA	Mustard	Grand National Tour			
May 23, 2025	Kendrick Lamar; SZA	Mustard	Grand National Tour			
May 24, 2025	Kendrick Lamar; SZA	Mustard	Grand National Tour			
May 31, 2025	Stray Kids		Dominate World Tour			
June 1, 2025	Stray Kids		Dominate World Tour			
June 19, 2025	Post Malone	Jelly Roll; Wyatt Flores; Chandler Walters	Big Ass Stadium Tour			
June 25, 2025	The Weeknd	Playboi Carti; Mike Dean	After Hours til Dawn Tour			
June 26, 2025	The Weeknd	Playboi Carti; Mike Dean	After Hours til Dawn Tour			
June 28, 2025	The Weeknd	Playboi Carti; Mike Dean	After Hours til Dawn Tour			
June 29, 2025	The Weeknd	Playboi Carti; Mike Dean	After Hours til Dawn Tour			
July 12, 2025	Blackpink		Deadline World Tour			
July 13, 2025	Blackpink		Deadline World Tour			
July 19, 2025	George Strait; Chris Stapleton	Little Big Town				
August 2, 2025	Multiple Performers	—	Hard Summer			
August 3, 2025	Multiple Performers	—	Hard Summer			
August 4, 2025	Shakira	The Black Eyed Peas	Las Mujeres Ya No Lloran World Tour			First Latin female act to headline a concert. Originally scheduled for June 20, but rescheduled due to the June 2025 Los Angeles protests.
August 5, 2025	Shakira	The Black Eyed Peas	Las Mujeres Ya No Lloran World Tour			First Latin female act to headline a concert. Originally scheduled for June 20, but rescheduled due to the June 2025 Los Angeles protests.
September 13, 2025	Chris Brown	Summer Walker; Bryson Tiller	Breezy Bowl XX			
September 14, 2025	Chris Brown	Summer Walker; Bryson Tiller	Breezy Bowl XX			
February 20, 2026	Los Bukis		¡Tuyos Por Siempre!			
February 21, 2026	Los Bukis		¡Tuyos Por Siempre!			
April 1, 2026	Kanye West	Don Toliver; North West	Ye Live Concert Tour	148,777 / 148,777	$32,596,731	Friday show over $18,000,000+ one of the highest grossing single shows in music history
April 3, 2026	Kanye West	Travis Scott; CeeLo Green; North West; Lauryn Hill Zion & YG Marley	Ye Live Concert Tour	148,777 / 148,777	$32,596,731	Friday show over $18,000,000+ one of the highest grossing single shows in music history
August 1, 2026	Multiple Performers	—	Hard Summer			
August 2, 2026	Multiple Performers	—	Hard Summer			
August 8, 2026	Ed Sheeran	Myles Smith; Sigrid; Aaron Rowe	Loop Tour			
August 14, 2026	Karol G		Viajando Por El Mundo Tropitour			
August 15, 2026	Karol G		Viajando Por El Mundo Tropitour			
August 16, 2026	Karol G		Viajando Por El Mundo Tropitour			
September 1, 2026	BTS		Arirang World Tour	282,000	$57,700,000	Tied with Beyoncé for the most overall shows performed by a band or artist at the stadium.
September 2, 2026	BTS		Arirang World Tour	282,000	$57,700,000	Tied with Beyoncé for the most overall shows performed by a band or artist at the stadium.
September 5, 2026	BTS		Arirang World Tour	282,000	$57,700,000	Tied with Beyoncé for the most overall shows performed by a band or artist at the stadium.
September 6, 2026	BTS		Arirang World Tour	282,000	$57,700,000	Tied with Beyoncé for the most overall shows performed by a band or artist at the stadium.
September 25, 2026	Usher; Chris Brown		The R&B Tour			
September 26, 2026	Usher; Chris Brown		The R&B Tour			
September 30, 2026	Bruno Mars	DJ Pee .Wee; Raye	The Romantic Tour			
October 2, 2026	Bruno Mars	DJ Pee .Wee; Raye	The Romantic Tour			
October 3, 2026	Bruno Mars	DJ Pee .Wee; Raye	The Romantic Tour			
October 6, 2026	Bruno Mars	DJ Pee .Wee; Raye	The Romantic Tour			
October 7, 2026	Bruno Mars	DJ Pee .Wee; Raye	The Romantic Tour			
October 23, 2026	Jay-Z		JAŸ-Z 30 Tour			
October 24, 2026	Jay-Z		JAŸ-Z 30 Tour			
November 15, 2026	Usher; Chris Brown		The R&B Tour			
November 16, 2026	Usher; Chris Brown		The R&B Tour			
March 13, 2027	BigBang		XX: Cosmos World Tour			
May 29, 2027	Stray Kids		Run It World Tour			
July 20, 2027	Zach Bryan	Ryan Bingham and The Texas Gentlemen; Gabriella Rose	Young Manhood and Other Donatable Organs Tour			
August 13, 2027	Slipknot	Bring Me The Horizon; Loathe	(sic)est Stadium Tour			

== NFL attendances ==
NFL team	Year	Home games	Avg. attendance
Los Angeles Rams	2025	8	73,235
Los Angeles Chargers	2025	9	71,560
Los Angeles Rams	2024	9	73,194
Los Angeles Chargers	2024	8	69,966
Los Angeles Rams	2023	8	73,150
Los Angeles Chargers	2023	9	69,736
Los Angeles Rams	2022	9	72,734
Los Angeles Chargers	2022	8	69,955
Los Angeles Rams	2021	8	71,598
Los Angeles Chargers	2021	9	70,240
Los Angeles Rams	2020	8	—N/a (Note: No fans in attendance due to COVID-19 pandemic.)
Los Angeles Chargers	2020	8	—N/a

== Hollywood Park ==
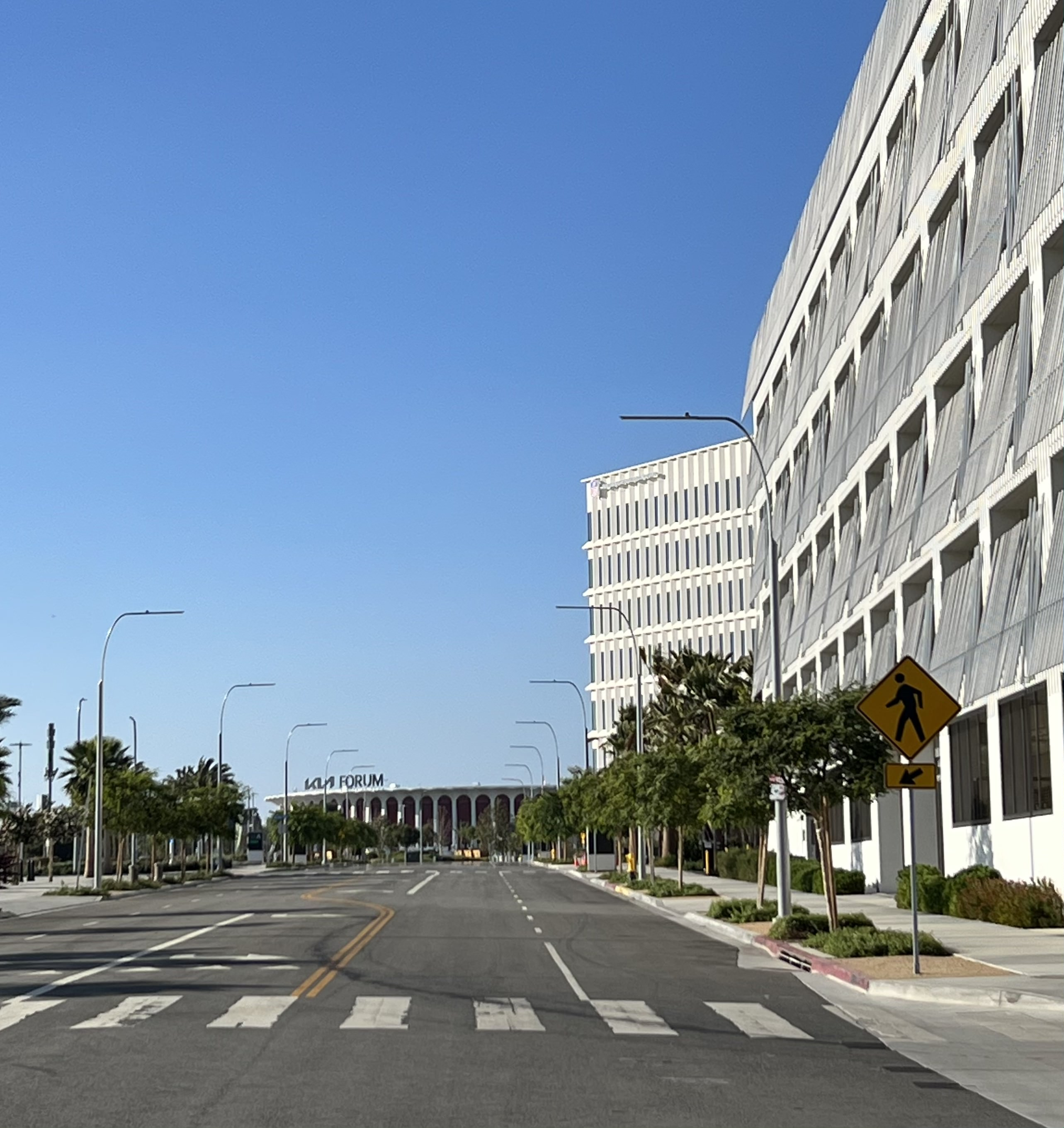
NFL Los Angeles campus and Kia Forum

The stadium and the adjacent Lake Park are central to Hollywood Park, an entertainment complex and master-planned neighborhood named after the former horse racing track that sat on the site. Hollywood Park consists of over 8.5 million square feet (790,000 m^{2}) that is used for office space and condominiums, a 12-screen Cinépolis multiplex movie theater featuring IMAX, ballrooms, an open air shopping mall, outdoor spaces for community programming, retail, a fitness center, a 13-story luxury hotel, a brewery, an 18,000 square feet (1,700 m^{2}) film studio complex named Hollywood Park Studios, five restaurants and a shopping and entertainment complex. Adjacent to the stadium is an artificial lake colloquially known as Rivers Lake, with a waterfall and fountain. The YouTube Theater, which seats 6,000, is under the southeast corner of the stadium canopy.

The Kali Hotel and Rooftop, a 300-room, Marriott Autograph Collection property developed by KPC Development Company, is under construction at Hollywood Park. Designed by LJC Design & Engineering and built by Clayco, the hotel broke ground in October 2024, topped out in September 2025, and is expected to open in September 2026. It is the only lodging property permitted within the Hollywood Park Specific Plan.

The first establishment to open in Hollywood Park was the Hollywood Park Casino, which opened on October 21, 2016. The NFL opened a new west coast campus in a seven-story office tower at Hollywood Park next to the stadium on September 8, 2021. Replacing a facility in Culver City, "NFL Los Angeles" consists of 214,063 square feet (19,887.1 m^{2}) of leased office space and a 74,992 square feet (6,967.0 m^{2}) studio, and features 20 conference rooms, five soundstages and an outdoor studio. One of its main tenants is NFL Media—which operates NFL Films, NFL Network, NFL RedZone, and the league's digital properties from the building. The league has also used the facility as a secondary hub for replay reviews. On August 6, 2025, as part of ESPN, Inc.'s acquisition of the NFL Network, and NFL RedZone, ESPN took over the lease for the studio space that the NFL Network occupied. On July 1, 2026, ESPN announced that they would be relocating their Los Angeles operations to Inglewood.

== Public transportation ==
The SoFi Stadium Express Shuttle is a free shuttle bus service operated by the Los Angeles County Metropolitan Transportation Authority (Metro), providing transportation between SoFi Stadium and the LAX/Metro Transit Center. From there, passengers can connect to the Metro C Line and K Line. The shuttle operates during pre-season, regular-season, and post-season NFL games, as well as select special events. Service runs every five to eight minutes beginning three hours before kickoff and continuing until 90 minutes after the conclusion of the event.

GTrans operates the 7X Stadium Express, a Sunday-only shuttle route connecting the Harbor Gateway Transit Center in Gardena to SoFi Stadium. The route also provides a transfer to the Metro C Line at the Hawthorne/Lennox station.

SoFi Stadium is also served year-round by several local bus routes, including Metro lines: 115, 117, and 212, as well as Torrance Transit line 10.

The city of Inglewood proposed building the Inglewood Transit Connector, a 1.6-mile (2.6 km) automated people mover that would have linked the Downtown Inglewood station with the Hollywood Park area. However, the project was later canceled in 2024 though it has since been revived.

== In popular culture ==
- On September 9, 2020, the stadium's construction was the subject of a two-hour special called NFL Super Stadiums on Science Channel.
- In December 2021, the stadium was used as the venue for the Influencer Games, a YouTube Originals miniseries hosted by MrBeast. The first video showed MrBeast put YouTubers and TikTokers against each other in a series of mini-games in various parts of the stadium complex. After that, the second video showed the remaining contestants play a game of hide and seek around the entire complex.
- The stadium served as a filming location for part of the Starfleet Academy in Season 2 of Star Trek: Picard.
- The stadium was featured in Season 1, Episode 5 of The Idol and the episode was filmed during The Weeknd's show on September 2, 2022. The Weeknd also released the live album, Live at SoFi Stadium, recorded during his 2022 November shows at the stadium.
- The concert film Taylor Swift: The Eras Tour features footage from the first three shows performed at the stadium.
- The stadium was featured as the location of Kyle's White Party on the 13th season finale of The Real Housewives of Beverly Hills.

== See also ==
- History of the Los Angeles Rams
- History of the Los Angeles Chargers
- Lists of stadiums

== Notes ==
Events and tenants
Preceded by Los Angeles Memorial Coliseum	Home of the Los Angeles Rams; 2020–present	Succeeded by Current
Preceded by Dignity Health Sports Park	Home of the Los Angeles Chargers; 2020–present	Succeeded by Current
Preceded by AT&T Stadium	Host of WrestleMania; 2023 (39)	Succeeded by Lincoln Financial Field
Preceded by Raymond James Stadium; Levi's Stadium	Host of the Super Bowl; LVI 2022; LXI 2027	Succeeded by State Farm Stadium; Mercedes-Benz Stadium
Preceded by Lambeau Field	Host of the NFC Championship Game; 2022	Succeeded by Lincoln Financial Field
Preceded by Seine (opening ceremony); Jardins du Trocadéro (closing ceremony); Paris	Summer Olympics; Formal opening and cultural closing ceremonies venue 2028	Succeeded by Brisbane Olympic Stadium; Brisbane
