= Lake Park (California) =

Public space at SoFi Stadium, California

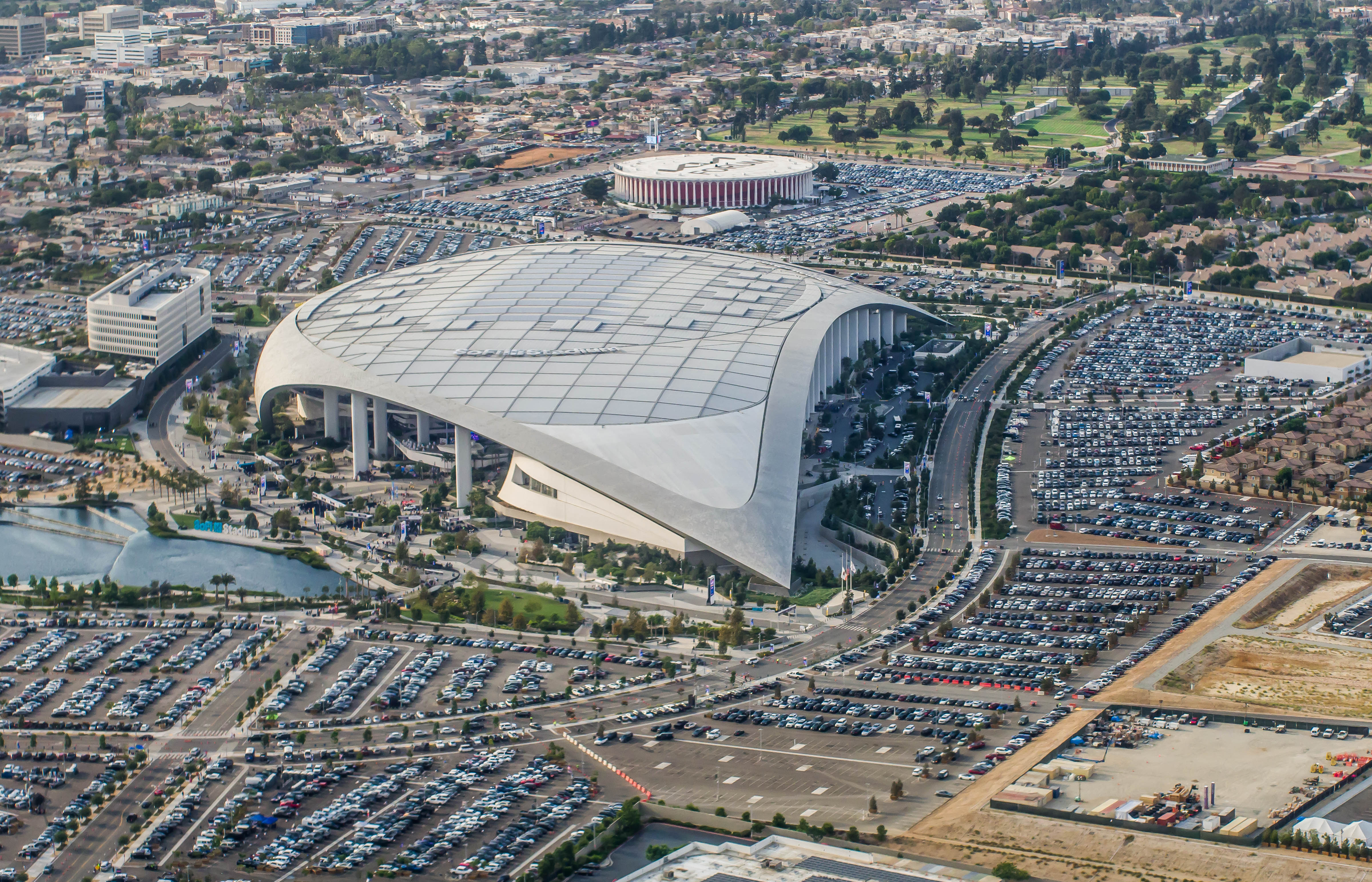
- Aerial view of park in front of SoFi Stadium

- Location within the Los Angeles metropolitan area Location within California
- Location: Hollywood Park District, Inglewood, California
- Coordinates: 33°57′1″N 118°20′14″W
- Area: 12 acres (4.9 ha)

Lake Park is 12 acres (4.9 ha) of privately owned public open urban green space on the south side of SoFi Stadium, part of the Hollywood Park complex in Inglewood, California, United States. Six acres (2.4 ha) of parkland surround the six acre lake. The stadium and park are central to the 298-acre multi-use project (121 ha) with several public art works.

The landscape of the park is integral to the design of the area while also being used for stormwater harvesting. At 15 feet (4.6 m) deep and holding close to 11 million US gallons (42,000,000 L; 9,200,000 imp gal) of water, it captures 70-80% of the rainwater in the entire complex. This reclaimed water amounts to 26 million US gallons (98,000,000 L; 22,000,000 imp gal) annually used to water the entirety of the greenery throughout the stadium park and its surrounding streetscapes. In addition to its use in sustainable water usage, the lake is designed to be an aesthetic addition to the American Airlines Plaza with the Lake Park Overlook viewing platform having a wide view of the stadium’s curved form. The upper and lower portions of the lake are separated by cascading waterfalls.

== Activities ==
The park is connected to the rest of the site through 25 acres (10 ha) of park spaces and landscaped plazas. The park includes a stage for outdoor performances. The park is used as a space to distribute public service handouts or sell official merchandise.

The lake and adjacent landscaping can be attractive to large flocks of migrating birds which is undesirable since the lake is under the flight path of Los Angeles International Airport. Hawks and other raptors are used on a regular basis to discourage birds from the site. While the hawks merely fly around and return to the falconer for a food reward, they appear to the birds to be a real threat.
